= 2026 United States House of Representatives elections =

House elections for the 120th U.S. Congress

- November 3, 2026

All 435 seats in the United States House of Representatives (Note: As well as five of the six non-voting delegates) 218 seats needed for a majority
- Turnout: 123.2 million (UF Election Lab)
- Declared: 99.1% as of 3:15 PM, November 22, 2026 EST (Note: Percentage of districts that have been called)
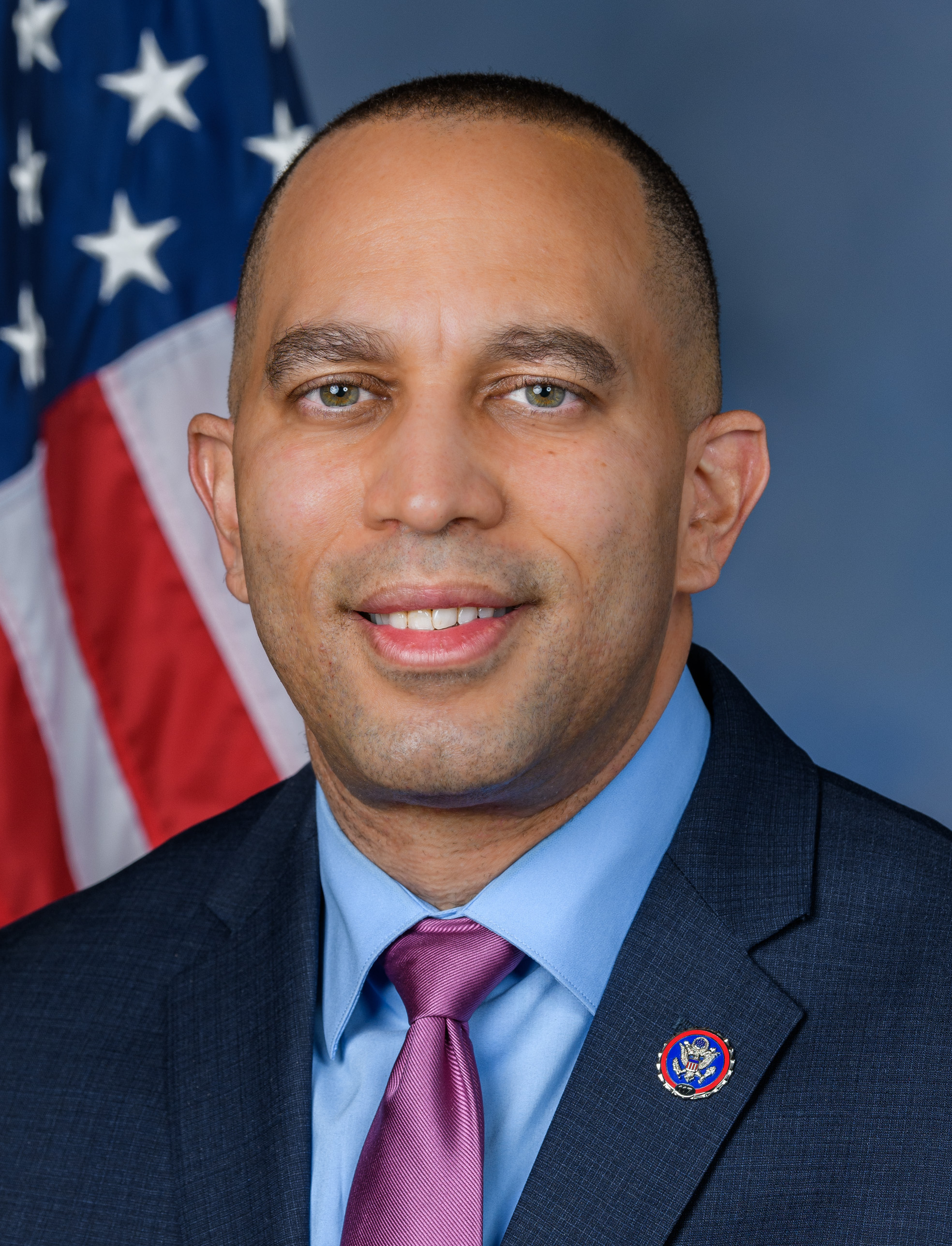

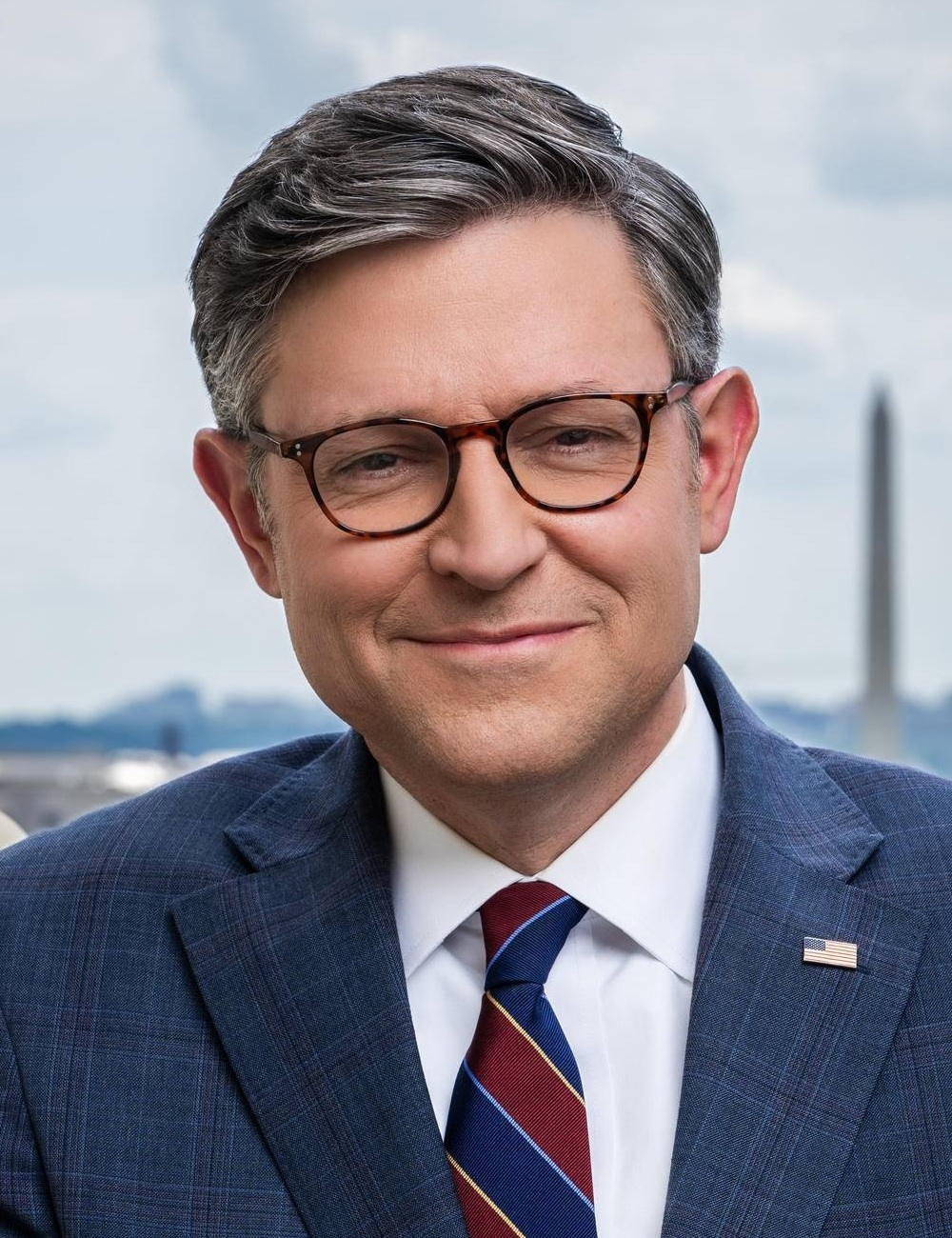
	Majority party	Minority party
Leader	Hakeem Jeffries	Mike Johnson
Party	Democratic	Republican
Leader since	January 3, 2023	October 25, 2023
Leader's seat	New York 8th	Louisiana 4th
Last election	215 seats, 47.2%	220 seats, 49.8%
Seats before	214	218 (Note: Not including Kevin Kiley, who was elected as a Republican and left the Republican Party in March 2026, but remained in the House Republican Caucus.)
Seats won	259	173
Seat change	▲44–47	▼44–47
Popular vote	66,978,274	50,238,280
Percentage	56.3%	42.2%
Swing	▲9.1 pp	▼7.6 pp
- Democratic hold Democratic gain Republican hold Republican gain TBD result TBD in runoff
Speaker before election
Mike Johnson
Republican
Speaker after election
TBD (Note: With the House being under Democratic control, the speaker will likely be a Democrat, however it is not certain until the House formally elects a Speaker in January.)

The 2026 United States House of Representatives elections were held on Tuesday, November 3, 2026, as part of the 2026 midterm elections during President Donald Trump's second, nonconsecutive term. Voters elected representatives from all 435 congressional districts across each of the fifty U.S. states, and five of the six non-voting delegates from the District of Columbia and the inhabited U.S. territories.

Special elections are also being held on dates throughout 2026. Numerous other federal, state, and local elections, including elections to the Senate, were also held on November 3, 2026. The winners of this election will serve in the 120th United States Congress in January 3, 2027, with seats apportioned among the states based on the 2020 United States census and revised district maps as a result of the 2025–2026 United States redistricting.

Primary elections for all 435 House seats, and five of the six non-voting delegate seats were held starting on March 3 and concluded on September 15, 2026. The Democratic Party has won a majority for the first time since 2020. With one district uncalled (a recounts is being conducted in MN-01) and two going to a runoff (LA-05 and LA-06), the Democratic party will win at least 259 seats, their largest majority since 1990. Democrats have won the popular vote with a margin of victory of 14 points, the largest margin for either party since Democrats' post-Watergate 1974 victory. With more than 40 Democratic flips, this was dubbed a "blue tsunami".

== Results ==
=== Nationwide ===
↓
259	3	173
Democratic	TBD	Republican

Parties	Popular vote			Seats			
Parties	Vote	%	Change	2024	2026	+/−	Strength
Democratic Party	66,781,010	56.16%	▲8.67	215			
Republican Party	50,144,715	42.17%	▼7.98	220			
Independent	843,958	0.71%	▲0.09	—			
Libertarian Party	476,561	0.4%	▼0.08	—			
Green Party	138,123	0.12%	Steady	—			
Constitution Party	44,841	0.04%	▼0.09	—			
Other parties	215,042	0.18%	▲0.05	—			
Write-ins and scattered votes (minor candidates grouped together)	257,744	0.22%	▼0.70	—			
Totals	118,589,501	100.00%	—	435	435	Steady	100.00%
Source: The Green Papers

=== Per state ===
House seats by party holding majority in state

Net changes to U.S. House seats after the 2026 elections +7 Dem House seats +3–5 Dem House seats +2 Dem House seats +1 Dem House seat +1 Rep House seat Both parties won a seat and lost a seat, no net change. TBD

State	Total seats	Democratic		Republican	
State	Total seats	Seats	Change	Seats	Change
Alabama	7	2	Steady	5	Steady
Alaska	1	0	Steady	1	Steady
Arizona	9	5	▲2	4	▼2
Arkansas	4	0	Steady	4	Steady
California	52	48	▲5	4	▼5
Colorado	8	7	▲3	1	▼3
Connecticut	5	5	Steady	0	Steady
Delaware	1	1	Steady	0	Steady
Florida	28	8	Steady	20	Steady
Georgia	14	5	Steady	9	Steady
Hawaii	2	2	Steady	0	Steady
Idaho	2	0	Steady	2	Steady
Illinois	17	14	Steady	3	Steady
Indiana	9	3	▲1	6	▼1
Iowa	4	3	▲3	1	▼3
Kansas	4	1	Steady	3	Steady
Kentucky	6	2	▲1	4	▼1
Louisiana	6				
Maine	2	1	▼1	1	▲1
Maryland	8	7	Steady	1	Steady
Massachusetts	9	9	Steady	0	Steady
Michigan	13	9	▲3	4	▼3
Minnesota	8	5	▲1	3	▼1
Mississippi	4	1	Steady	3	Steady
Missouri	8	3	▲1	5	▼1
Montana	2	1	▲1	1	▼1
Nebraska	3	1	▲1	2	▼1
Nevada	4	4	▲1	0	▼1
New Hampshire	2	2	Steady	0	Steady
New Jersey	12	11	▲2	1	▼2
New Mexico	3	3	Steady	0	Steady
New York	26	20	▲1	6	▼1
North Carolina	14	11	▲7	3	▼7
North Dakota	1	0	Steady	1	Steady
Ohio	15	8	▲3	7	▼3
Oklahoma	5	0	Steady	5	Steady
Oregon	6	5	Steady	1	Steady
Pennsylvania	17	11	▲4	6	▼4
Rhode Island	2	2	Steady	0	Steady
South Carolina	7	2	▲1	5	▼1
South Dakota	1	0	Steady	1	Steady
Tennessee	9	1	Steady	8	Steady
Texas	38	14	▲1	24	▼1
Utah	4	1	▲1	3	▼1
Vermont	1	1	Steady	0	Steady
Virginia	11	8	▲2	3	▼2
Washington	10	8	Steady	2	Steady
West Virginia	2	0	Steady	2	Steady
Wisconsin	8	4	▲2	4	▼2
Wyoming	1	0	Steady	1	Steady
Total	435				

== Retirements ==
Retiring incumbents by district Democratic incumbent ran Democratic incumbent retired or lost renomination Republican incumbent ran Republican incumbent retired, lost renomination, or withdrew Independent incumbent ran No incumbent ran (Note: As a result of redistricting) Vacant (Note: As a result of death, resignation, or expulsion)

60 representatives and two non-voting delegates (26 Democrats and 36 Republicans) retired and did not seek re-election, 29 of whom (9 Democrats and 20 Republicans) retired to run for other offices. This is the second-most retirements of representatives in a single election cycle in US history next to 1992, which saw 65 total retirements.

=== Democratic ===
1. California 11: Nancy Pelosi retired.
2. California 26: Julia Brownley retired.
3. District of Columbia at-large: Eleanor Holmes Norton retired.
4. Florida 24: Frederica Wilson retired.
5. Georgia 13: Everton Blair retired.
6. Illinois 2: Robin Kelly retired to run for the U.S. Senate.
7. Illinois 4: Chuy García retired.
8. Illinois 7: Danny Davis retired.
9. Illinois 8: Raja Krishnamoorthi retired to run for the U.S. Senate.
10. Illinois 9: Jan Schakowsky retired.
11. Louisiana 6: Cleo Fields retired to run for Louisiana State Senate due to redistricting.
12. Maine 2: Jared Golden retired.
13. Maryland 5: Steny Hoyer retired.
14. Massachusetts 6: Seth Moulton retired to run for the U.S. Senate.
15. Michigan 11: Haley Stevens retired to run for the U.S. Senate.
16. Minnesota 2: Angie Craig retired to run for the U.S. Senate.
17. New Hampshire 1: Chris Pappas retired to run for the U.S. Senate.
18. New Jersey 12: Bonnie Watson Coleman retired.
19. New York 7: Nydia Velázquez retired.
20. New York 12: Jerry Nadler retired.
21. Pennsylvania 3: Dwight Evans retired.
22. Tennessee 9: Steve Cohen retired due to redistricting.
23. Texas 30: Jasmine Crockett retired to run for the U.S. Senate.
24. Texas 33: Marc Veasey retired (previously ran for Tarrant County Judge).
25. Texas 37: Lloyd Doggett retired due to redistricting.
26. U.S. Virgin Islands at-large: Stacey Plaskett retired to run for governor of the U.S. Virgin Islands.

=== Republican ===
1. Alabama 1: Barry Moore retired to run for the U.S. Senate.
2. Arizona 1: David Schweikert retired to run for governor of Arizona.
3. Arizona 5: Andy Biggs retired to run for governor of Arizona.
4. California 48: Darrell Issa retired.
5. Florida 2: Neal Dunn retired.
6. Florida 11: Daniel Webster retired.
7. Florida 16: Vern Buchanan retired.
8. Florida 19: Byron Donalds retired to run for governor of Florida.
9. Georgia 1: Buddy Carter retired to run for the U.S. Senate.
10. Georgia 10: Mike Collins retired to run for the U.S. Senate.
11. Georgia 11: Barry Loudermilk retired.
12. Iowa 2: Ashley Hinson retired to run for the U.S. Senate.
13. Iowa 4: Randy Feenstra retired to run for governor of Iowa.
14. Kentucky 6: Andy Barr retired to run for the U.S. Senate.
15. Louisiana 5: Julia Letlow retired to run for the U.S. Senate.
16. Michigan 10: John James retired to run for governor of Michigan.
17. Missouri 6: Sam Graves retired.
18. Montana 1: Ryan Zinke retired.
19. Nebraska 2: Don Bacon retired.
20. Nevada 2: Mark Amodei retired.
21. New York 21: Elise Stefanik retired (previously ran for governor of New York).
22. Oklahoma 1: Kevin Hern retired to run for the U.S. Senate.
23. South Carolina 1: Nancy Mace retired to run for governor of South Carolina.
24. South Carolina 5: Ralph Norman retired to run for governor of South Carolina and later for the U.S. Senate.
25. South Dakota at-large: Dusty Johnson retired to run for governor of South Dakota.
26. Tennessee 6: John Rose retired to run for governor of Tennessee.
27. Texas 8: Morgan Luttrell retired.
28. Texas 10: Michael McCaul retired.
29. Texas 19: Jodey Arrington retired.
30. Texas 21: Chip Roy retired to run for attorney general of Texas.
31. Texas 22: Troy Nehls retired.
32. Texas 38: Wesley Hunt retired to run for the U.S. Senate.
33. Utah 4: Burgess Owens retired.
34. Washington 4: Dan Newhouse retired.
35. Wisconsin 7: Tom Tiffany retired to run for governor of Wisconsin.
36. Wyoming at-large: Harriet Hageman retired to run for the U.S. Senate.

== Nomination withdrawn ==
=== Republican ===
1. North Carolina 11: Incumbent U.S. Representative Chuck Edwards originally won nomination in the Republican primaries on March 3, 2026, but dropped his re-election campaign on August 5 following a censure recommendation by the House Committee on Ethics.

== Resignations ==
Two seats will be left vacant on the day of the general election until the next Congress due to resignations.

=== Democratic ===
1. Florida 20: Sheila Cherfilus-McCormick resigned on April 21, 2026, following money laundering allegations.

=== Republican ===
1. Texas 23: Tony Gonzales resigned on April 14, 2026, after admitting to an affair.

== Incumbents defeated ==
=== Incumbents defeated in primary elections ===
==== Democrats ====
Seven Democrats lost renomination.

1. Colorado 1: Diana DeGette lost renomination to Melat Kiros.
2. Connecticut 1: John B. Larson lost renomination to Luke Bronin.
3. Michigan 13: Shri Thanedar lost renomination to Donavan McKinney.
4. New York 10: Dan Goldman lost renomination to Brad Lander.
5. New York 13: Adriano Espaillat lost renomination to Darializa Avila Chevalier.
6. Texas 18: Al Green lost a redistricting race to fellow incumbent Christian Menefee.
7. Texas 33: Julie Johnson lost renomination to Colin Allred.

==== Republicans ====
Four Republicans lost renomination.

1. Florida 7: Cory Mills lost renomination to Ryan Elijah.
2. Kentucky 4: Thomas Massie lost renomination to Ed Gallrein.
3. Tennessee 5: Andy Ogles lost renomination to Charlie Hatcher.
4. Texas 2: Dan Crenshaw lost renomination to Steve Toth.

=== Incumbents defeated in general elections ===
==== Republicans ====
36 Republican incumbents were defeated, 35 by Democrats and one by a fellow Republican.

1. Arizona 6: Juan Ciscomani (first elected in 2022) lost to JoAnna Mendoza.
2. California 1: James Gallagher (first elected in 2026) lost to Mike McGuire.
3. California 22: David Valadao (first elected in 2012, and then re-elected in 2020 after losing in 2018) lost to Randy Villegas.
4. California 40: Young Kim (first elected in 2020) lost to fellow Republican incumbent Ken Calvert.
5. Colorado 4: Lauren Boebert (first elected in 2020) lost to Eileen Laubacher.
6. Colorado 5: Jeff Crank (first elected in 2024) lost to Jessica Killin.
7. Colorado 8: Gabe Evans (first elected in 2024) lost to Manny Rutinel.
8. Guam at-large: James Moylan (first elected in 2022) lost to Alicia Limtiaco.
9. Indiana 5: Victoria Spartz (first elected in 2020) lost to J. D. Ford.
10. Iowa 1: Mariannette Miller-Meeks (first elected in 2020) lost to Christina Bohannan.
11. Iowa 3: Zach Nunn (first elected in 2022) lost to Sarah Trone Garriott.
12. Michigan 4: Bill Huizenga (first elected in 2010) lost to Sean McCann.
13. Michigan 7: Tom Barrett (first elected in 2024) lost to William Lawrence.
14. Missouri 2: Ann Wagner (first elected in 2012) lost to Fred Wellman.
15. New Jersey 2: Jeff Van Drew (first elected in 2018 as a Democrat) lost to Zack Mullock.
16. New Jersey 7: Thomas Kean Jr. (first elected in 2022) lost to Rebecca Bennett.
17. New York 17: Mike Lawler (first elected in 2022) lost to Cait Conley.
18. North Carolina 3: Greg Murphy (first elected in 2019) lost to Raymond Smith Jr.
19. North Carolina 5: Virginia Foxx (first elected in 2004) lost to Chuck Hubbard.
20. North Carolina 6: Addison McDowell (first elected in 2024) lost to Cyril Jefferson.
21. North Carolina 9: Richard Hudson (first elected in 2012) lost to Richard Ojeda.
22. North Carolina 13: Brad Knott (first elected in 2024) lost to Paul Barringer.
23. North Carolina 14: Tim Moore (first elected in 2024) lost to LaKesha Womack.
24. Ohio 7: Max Miller (first elected in 2022) lost to Brian Poindexter.
25. Ohio 10: Mike Turner (first elected in 2002) lost to Kristina Knickerbocker.
26. Ohio 15: Mike Carey (first elected in 2021) lost to Don Leonard.
27. Pennsylvania 1: Brian Fitzpatrick (first elected in 2016) lost to Bob Harvie.
28. Pennsylvania 7: Ryan Mackenzie (first elected in 2024) lost to Bob Brooks.
29. Pennsylvania 8: Rob Bresnahan (first elected in 2024) lost to Paige Cognetti.
30. Pennsylvania 10: Scott Perry (first elected in 2012) lost to Janelle Stelson.
31. Tennessee 4: Scott DesJarlais (first elected in 2010) lost to Victoria Broderick.
32. Texas 15: Monica De La Cruz (first elected in 2022) lost to Bobby Pulido.
33. Virginia 1: Rob Wittman (first elected in 2007) lost to Shannon Taylor.
34. Virginia 2: Jen Kiggans (first elected in 2022) lost to Elaine Luria.
35. Wisconsin 1: Bryan Steil (first elected in 2018) lost to Mitchell Berman.
36. Wisconsin 3: Derrick Van Orden (first elected in 2022) lost to Rebecca Cooke.

==== Democrats ====
Two Democratic incumbents were defeated, both by fellow Democrats.

1. California 4: Mike Thompson (first elected in 1998) lost to fellow Democrat Eric Jones.
2. California 34: Jimmy Gomez (first elected in 2017) lost to fellow Democrat Angela Gonzales-Torres.

==== Independent ====
One independent incumbent (who caucused with the Republicans) was defeated by a Democrat.

1. California 6: Kevin Kiley (first elected in 2022 as a Republican) lost to Richard Pan.

== Open seats ==
=== Open seats that changed parties ===
==== Republican seats won by Democrats ====
1. Arizona 1: Won by Amish Shah.
2. California 48: Won by Marni von Wilpert.
3. Iowa 2: Won by Lindsay James.
4. Kentucky 6: Won by Zach Dembo.
5. Michigan 10: Won by Christina Hines.
6. Montana 1: Won by Sam Forstag.
7. Nebraska 2: Won by Denise Powell.
8. Nevada 2: Won by Teresa Benitez-Thompson.
9. North Carolina 11: Won by Jamie Ager.
10. South Carolina 1: Won by Nancy Lacore.
11. Texas 23: Won by Katy Padilla Stout.
12. Utah 1: Won by Ben McAdams.

==== Democratic seats won by Republicans ====
1. Maine 2: Won by Paul LePage.
2. Tennessee 9: Won by Brent Taylor.
3. Texas 32: Won by Jace Yarbrough.

=== Open seats that parties held ===
==== Democratic seats held by Democrats ====
1. California 11: Won by Scott Wiener.
2. California 26: Won by Jacqui Irwin.
3. California 38: Won by Hilda Solis.
4. Colorado 1: Won by Melat Kiros.
5. Connecticut 1: Won by Luke Bronin.
6. District of Columbia at-large: Won by Robert White.
7. Florida 22: Won by Pia Dandiya.
8. Florida 24: Won by Oliver Gilbert.
9. Georgia 13: Won by Jasmine Clark.
10. Illinois 2: Won by Donna Miller.
11. Illinois 4: Won by Patty Garcia.
12. Illinois 7: Won by La Shawn Ford.
13. Illinois 8: Won by Melissa Bean.
14. Illinois 9: Won by Daniel Biss.
15. Massachusetts 6: Won by Dan Koh.
16. Maryland 5: Won by Adrian Boafo.
17. Michigan 11: Won by Jeremy Moss.
18. Michigan 13: Won by Donavan McKinney.
19. Minnesota 2: Won by Matt Little.
20. New Jersey 12: Won by Adam Hamawy.
21. New Hampshire 1: Won by Stefany Shaheen.
22. New York 7: Won by Claire Valdez.
23. New York 10: Won by Brad Lander.
24. New York 12: Won by Micah Lasher.
25. New York 13: Won by Darializa Avila Chevalier.
26. Pennsylvania 3: Won by Chris Rabb.
27. Texas 9: Won by Leticia Gutierrez.
28. Texas 30: Won by Frederick Haynes III.
29. Texas 33: Won by Colin Allred.
30. Texas 35: Won by Johnny Garcia.
31. U.S. Virgin Islands at-large: Won by Janelle Sarauw.

==== Republican seats held by Republicans ====
1. Alabama 1: Won by Jerry Carl.
2. Arizona 5: Won by Mark Lamb.
3. Florida 2: Won by Austin Rogers.
4. Florida 7: Won by Ryan Elijah.
5. Florida 11: Won by Joe Strada.
6. Florida 16: Won by Sydney Gruters.
7. Florida 19: Won by Jim Schwartzel.
8. Georgia 1: Won by Jim Kingston.
9. Georgia 10: Won by Houston Gaines.
10. Georgia 11: Won by John Cowan.
11. Iowa 4: Won by Chris McGowan.
12. Kentucky 4: Won by Ed Gallrein.
13. Missouri 6: Won by Chris Stigall.
14. New York 21: Won by Anthony Constantino.
15. Oklahoma 1: Won by Mark Tedford.
16. South Carolina 5: Won by Wes Climer.
17. South Dakota at-large: Won by Marty Jackley.
18. Tennessee 5: Won by Charlie Hatcher.
19. Tennessee 6: Won by Johnny Garrett.
20. Texas 2: Won by Steve Toth.
21. Texas 8: Won by Jessica Steinmann.
22. Texas 10: Won by Chris Gober.
23. Texas 19: Won by Tom Sell.
24. Texas 21: Won by Mark Teixeira.
25. Texas 22: Won by Trever Nehls.
26. Texas 38: Won by Jon Bonck.
27. Washington 4: Won by Amanda McKinney.
28. Wisconsin 7: Won by Michael Alfonso.
29. Wyoming at-large: Won by Chuck Gray.

== Crossover seats ==
This is a list of congressional seats that voted for one party in the 2024 presidential election and another in the 2024 House elections.

=== Democratic ===
There were originally 13 districts which Donald Trump won in 2024 that are represented by Democrats. This table only includes the 11 remaining after mid-cycle redistricting. Four of these districts were already won by Trump but were made more Republican-leaning through redistricting.

District			Incumbent				2026 result
Location	2026 PVI	Trump 2024	Member	Party	First elected	2024 result	2026 result
Maine 2	R+4	R+9.0	Jared Golden (retiring)	Democratic	2018	D+0.7	LePage (flip)
Michigan 8	R+1	R+2.0	Kristen McDonald Rivet	Democratic	2024	D+6.6	McDonald Rivet
Nevada 3	D+1	R+0.7	Susie Lee	Democratic	2018	D+2.7	Lee
New Jersey 9	D+2	R+1.1	Nellie Pou	Democratic	2024	D+4.9	Pou
New Mexico 2	EVEN	R+1.9	Gabe Vasquez	Democratic	2022	D+4.2	Vasquez
New York 3	EVEN	R+4.3	Tom Suozzi	Democratic	2016; 2022 (retired); 2024 (special)	D+3.6	Suozzi
North Carolina 1	R+5	R+11.6	Don Davis (Note: Davis was elected to a previous, competitive, version of this district which Trump only won by 3.2 points in 2024, but it was redrawn to be more strongly Republican-leaning in 2025 by the North Carolina state legislature.)	Democratic	2022	D+1.7	Davis
Ohio 9	R+5	R+10.5	Marcy Kaptur (Note: Kaptur was first elected to a previous, competitive but Republican-tilting, version of this district which Trump won by 6.7 points in 2024, but it was redrawn to be more strongly Republican-leaning by a bipartisan redistricting commission, as the previous maps expired in 2024.)	Democratic	1982	D+0.6	Kaptur
Texas 28	R+3	R+10.4	Henry Cuellar (Note: Cuellar was elected to a previous, competitive but Republican-tilting, version of this district which Trump only won by 7.3 points in 2024, but it was redrawn to be more strongly Republican-leaning in 2025 by the Texas state legislature.)	Democratic	2004	D+5.6	Cuellar
Texas 34	R+3	R+10.1	Vicente Gonzalez (Note: Gonzalez was elected to a previous, competitive but Republican-tilting, version of this district which Trump only won by 4.4 points in 2024, but it was redrawn to be more strongly Republican-leaning in 2025 by the Texas state legislature.)	Democratic	2016	D+2.6	Gonzalez
Washington 3	R+2	R+3.3	Marie Gluesenkamp Perez	Democratic	2022	D+3.9	Gluesenkamp Perez

Mid-cycle redistricting in Republican-controlled states created 11 more districts which Trump would have won had they existed in 2024.

District				Incumbent				2026 result
Location	Original 2025 PVI	New 2026 PVI	Trump 2024	Member	Party	First elected	2024 result	2026 result
Alabama 2	D+5	R+7	R+14.3	Shomari Figures	Democratic	2024	D+9.2	Figures
Florida 9	D+4	R+8	R+17.7	Darren Soto	Democratic	2016	D+12.6	Soto
Florida 14	D+5	R+4	R+10.5	Kathy Castor	Democratic	2006	D+15.4	Castor
Florida 22	D+4	R+4	R+10.5	Lois Frankel (running in the 23rd district)	Democratic	2012	D+9.9	Dandiya
Florida 25	D+5	R+3	R+9.2	Debbie Wasserman Schultz (running in the 20th district)	Democratic	2004	D+9.0	Moskowitz (redistricted)
Louisiana 6	D+8	R+16	R+31.8	Cleo Fields (retiring)	Democratic	1992; 1996 (retired); 2024	D+13.0	TBD
Ohio 1	D+3	R+1	R+1.9	Greg Landsman	Democratic	2022	D+9.2	Landsman
Tennessee 9	D+23	R+9	R+21.1	Steve Cohen (retiring)	Democratic	2006	D+45.6	Taylor (flip)
Texas 9	D+24	R+9	R+19.9	Al Green (ran in the 18th district and lost renomination)	Democratic	2004	D+100.0	Gutierrez
Texas 32	D+13	R+8	R+17.7	Julie Johnson (ran in the 33rd district and lost renomination)	Democratic	2024	D+23.5	Yarbrough (flip)
Texas 35	D+19	R+4	R+10.4	Greg Casar (running in the 37th district)	Democratic	2022	D+34.7	Garcia

=== Republican ===
There were originally three districts which Kamala Harris won in 2024 that are represented by Republicans.

District			Incumbent				2026 result
Location	2026 PVI	Harris 2024	Member	Party	First elected	2024 result	2026 result
Nebraska 2	D+3	D+4.6	Don Bacon (retiring)	Republican	2016	R+1.9	Powell (flip)
New York 17	D+1	D+0.6	Mike Lawler	Republican	2022	R+6.3	Conley (flip)
Pennsylvania 1	D+1	D+0.3	Brian Fitzpatrick	Republican	2016	R+12.8	Harvie (flip)

Mid-cycle redistricting, primarily due to California Proposition 50, created five more districts which Harris would have won had they existed in 2024.

District				Incumbent				2026 result
Location	Original 2025 PVI	New 2026 PVI	Harris 2024	Member	Party	First elected	2024 result	2026 result
California 1	R+12	D+7	D+12.2	James Gallagher	Republican	2026 (special)	R+30.7	McGuire (flip)
California 3	R+2	D+6	D+10.2	Kevin Kiley (running in the 6th district)	Independent	2022 (Note: Kiley was originally elected as a Republican. He left the Republican Party to become an independent in March 2026 but remains a member of the House Republican Conference.)	R+10.9	Bera (redistricted)
California 41	R+2	D+9	D+14.1	Ken Calvert (running in the 40th district)	Republican	1992	R+3.4	Sánchez (redistricted)
California 48	R+7	D+2	D+3.4	Darrell Issa (retiring)	Republican	2000; 2018 (retired); 2020	R+18.6	von Wilpert (flip)
Utah 1	R+10	D+12	D+23.7	Blake Moore (running in the 2nd district)	Republican	2020	R+31.0	McAdams (flip)

== Redistricting ==
States that had undergone mid-decade redistricting prior to the 2026 elections colored by which party was expected to benefit.: Finalized new map; Democratic gain expected Voluntary redistricting rejected / Finalized new map; Republican gain expected Redistricting challenge rejected New map finalized; later struck down in court

States that have undergone mid-decade redistricting prior to the 2026 elections colored by the reason for redistricting.: Voluntary redistricting enacted Voluntary redistricting rejected / Court-ordered/mandatory redistricting Redistricting challenge rejected New map finalized; later struck down in court

Following each decennial census, states with multiple congressional districts must revise their district maps to account for population changes. In 2026, most states used the same districts created in the redistricting cycle following the 2020 census, which were first used in the 2022 elections. Maps have changed or would change in several states, often due to legal challenges made based on partisan or racial gerrymandering. In April 2026, the Supreme Court ruled on Louisiana v. Callais that stricter scrutiny had to be applied with regard to section 2 of the Voting Rights Act.

=== Legal challenges to current maps ===
Several states had legal challenges to their maps that were put in place following the 2020 census.

- In Arkansas, a federal court dismissed a case against the congressional map that had had claimed the map did not comply with the Voting Rights Act.
- In Florida, the state Supreme Court dismissed a challenge to the congressional map, finding a new plurality-Black congressional district would be against federal law.
- In Georgia, litigation over the newly drawn congressional map that was used in the 2024 elections was not resolved in time for the 2026 Congressional elections.
- In Louisiana, litigation remained unresolved.
- A new map was required in Ohio due to the state's constitution, resulting in two districts becoming more Republican leaning.
- In South Carolina, the state Supreme Court ruled that partisan gerrymandering did not violate the state's constitution, keeping the maps in place.
- In Texas, a Voting Rights Act challenge in federal court case was paused pending expected new maps in the state.
- In Utah, a partisan gerrymander case resulted in a map which created a safe Democratic district comprising the majority of Salt Lake County.
- In Wisconsin, a challenge to the state's current congressional map, arguing it was an unlawful partisan gerrymander, was dismissed by the Wisconsin Supreme Court.

=== Out-of-cycle partisan redistricting efforts ===
At the urging of President Trump, Republican-led states moved by redraw their congressional maps to increase their number of Republicans who could win in this election.

- Governor Greg Abbott called a special session of the Texas Legislature to redraw its congressional districts, leading to the Texas Legislature passing new maps resulting in five new Republican-leaning districts. On November 18, a panel of the District Court for the Western District of Texas issued a preliminary injunction blocking the new map, putting the former map back in place, but the Supreme Court later placed an administrative stay on the ruling, allowing the new maps to stand.
- Governor Ron DeSantis expressed interest in redrawing Florida's congressional map, and the Florida House has created a special redistricting committee.
- Governor Mike Kehoe of Missouri called a special session on August 29, 2025, which redrew the solid Democratic 5th district to a solid Republican district, allowing the GOP to pick up a seat. However, on September 3, the Missouri Supreme Court unanimously ruled that the referendum on the new maps was sufficient and must be put on the ballot, thus leaving the 2022 maps in place for the 2026 elections.
- Republican state legislative leaders in North Carolina announced a redraw of the state's congressional districts to make the 1st congressional district more Republican leaning.
- Talks and efforts about redistricting occurred in Nebraska, New Hampshire, Indiana, and Kansas, but either failed or did not gain traction.

Democrats threatened to retaliate in states they controlled.

- The California State Legislature drafted a map eliminating five Republican districts to combat Texas's plan, which was approved by voters.
- The Virginia General Assembly announced a plan October 23, 2025, to begin the process to redraw the state's congressional districts before the 2026 elections.
- Maryland governor Wes Moore unsuccessfully pursued redistricting in his state.
- Redistricting was considered in Colorado, New Jersey, and New York. Legal and political challenges followed, preventing redistricting before this election.

=== Summary district map changes ===
State (linked to summaries below)	Status	Notes	Change in partisanship (Note: Competitive seats are defined as seats won by less than 10 points by their respective party in 2024)		
State (linked to summaries below)	Status	Notes	D	C	R
Alabama	New districts enacted	Governor Kay Ivey was initially reluctant to call a special session after Allen v. Milligan, but was lobbied to do so by the state attorney general and secretary of state, both of whom also filed emergency injunctions to lift the requirements levied on them by the federal courts. The Supreme Court lifted the stay, allowing the state to redraw the map. On May 26, 2026, an Alabama court blocked the new map, arguing that the Callais decision did not change the fact that the map intentionally discriminates against African-American voters in violation of the Constitution. On June 2, 2026, the Supreme Court stayed on the block, allowing the new map to be implemented.	Steady	▼1	▲1
Arkansas	Districts left in place	In Christian Ministerial Alliance v. Thurston, plaintiffs alleged racial gerrymandering diluting the voting power of black voters by splitting Little Rock into three districts. A federal court ruled that it did not constitute a racial gerrymander and dismissed the case.	Steady	Steady	Steady
California	New districts enacted	In response to Texas's redistricting, a new map was approved by voters in a special statewide election temporarily permitting an off-cycle redistricting. The state's constitution prohibits the state legislature from drawing congressional districts, so the map was subject to a 2025 referendum. It was passed by two-thirds of the legislature and over a 64% majority approval by the state's voters for the new districts to take place.	▲4	▼3	▼1
Florida	New districts enacted	In September 2023, a state circuit judge ruled that the map passed by the state legislature discriminated against Black voters, by redrawing the formerly plurality-Black 5th district to no longer have a Black plurality. Florida appealed this ruling and the map was reinstated by an appeals court. In July 2025, the Florida Supreme Court keep the current map in place, finding that creating a plurality-Black congressional district would violate the federal Equal Protection Clause. On January 9, 2026, Governor Ron DeSantis called for a special session in April redrawing the state's congressional map with the target of gaining 3 to 5 new Republican seats. However, Florida state law prevents deliberately redrawing congressional maps purely for partisan gain. On February 27, 2026, the Supreme Court of Florida rejected a petition to block the special session. On May 4, 2026, the new map was enacted.	▲1	▼4	▲3
Indiana	Districts left in place	On November 18, 2025, the Indiana State Senate voted 29–19 against meeting in December with their House colleagues to discuss redistricting. Despite this, Governor Mike Braun stated that he would "explore all options" to enable redistricting, in response to pressure from President Trump. On November 25, the state senate announced it would vote on a potential proposal approved by the state house. After passing in the state house, the state senate rejected the proposal 31–19.	Steady	Steady	Steady
Kansas	Districts left in place	Republican Kansas state legislators announced a plan to call a special session to redraw the 3rd congressional district, but lacked the necessary support in the House.	Steady	Steady	Steady
Louisiana	New districts enacted	Following Callais, the Supreme Court further struck down the lower court ruling requiring two black majority districts. Louisiana pushed to move back the primary dates in light of the court requiring redistricting. On May 29, 2026, the new map removed one of the two plurality-Black, Democratic-controlled districts.	▼1	Steady	▲1
Maryland	Districts left in place	In November 2025, Governor Wes Moore announced the creation of the Redistricting Advisory Commission which began the process of redistricting the congressional lines to make the 1st district more Democratic. The plan has received support from State House Speaker Joseline Peña-Melnyk, but opposition from State Senate President Bill Ferguson. In January 2026, the Governor's Redistricting Advisory Commission voted to recommend a congressional map that would redraw the 1st congressional district to make it more favorable for Democrats. The map passed the state house on February 2. On February 20, Ferguson told reporters that the window to redraw Maryland's congressional map had closed, killing the bill.	Steady	Steady	Steady
Missouri	Districts left in place	The Missouri Legislature passed a map to create a new safely Republican seat in the 5th district. Governor Mike Kehoe signed the map into law in September 2025. The map would be blocked by a referendum if enough signatures are gathered. In March 2026, opponents of the map said they had enough signatures for the referendum to qualify. On August 4, 2026, Missouri Secretary of State Denny Hoskins blocked the referendum, arguing that it would be unconstitutional under the state Constitution,, which was upheld by a Cole County circuit court on August 19. On September 3, the state Supreme Court ruled that the referendum must be put on the ballot, thus leaving the 2022 map in place for the 2026 elections. On September 8, the U.S. Supreme Court denied an emergency appeal by state Republicans. The same day, the local U.S. District Court issued a temporary restraining order in a separate lawsuit prohibiting the state from using anything but the new 2025 map. On September 10, the U.S. Supreme Court granted an emergency stay of the District Court's order, putting the 2022 map back into place for the 2026 elections. On September 21, the the local U.S. Court of Appeals affirmed the temporary restraining order and remanded the case to the trial court for entry of a permanent injunction enjoining Missouri to use the 2025 map, but stayed their ruling for a week pending appeal to the U.S. Supreme Court. On September 25, the U.S. Supreme Court held that state law rules in the case and granted an emergency stay of the appeal court's order and the district court's injunction, leaving the 2022 map in place for this elections.	Steady	Steady	Steady
New York	Districts left in place	Voters in the 11th district sued in October 2025, claiming the Staten Island-based district illegally dilutes the power of Black and Hispanic voters in the district. The state court ordered the independent redistricting commission to make a new map to reconfigure the district by February 6, 2026. That deadline was suspended after Rep. Malliotakis, who represents the district, appealed the ruling. On March 2, the U.S. Supreme Court temporarily blocked the state court's order, allowing the current map to be used for this election.	Steady	Steady	Steady
North Carolina	New districts enacted	The North Carolina legislature changed the congressional map making the competitive 1st congressional district more Republican-leaning on October 23, 2025. The Democratic governor, did not have the authority to veto the map. It received pushback from the NAACP and Common Cause, both of which accused the new map of diluting the minority vote. A hearing was held on November 19 to consider blocking the map.	Steady	▼1	▲1
Ohio	New districts enacted	Ohio voters amended the constitution in 2018, creating a process that requires both Republicans and Democrats in the state legislature to vote on the new congressional map. In the 2020 redistricting cycle, Democrats did not back a Republican proposal, necessitating a new map to be drawn in 2025. In October 2025, the Ohio Redistricting Commission passed a compromise map in a unanimous vote. The new map made the 1st district more competitive, the 9th district lean more Republican, and the 13th district lean more Democratic.	Steady	▼2	▲2
South Carolina	Districts left in place	In June 2025, the South Carolina Supreme Court, in League of Women Voters v. Alexander, considered whether the congressional map is an unlawful partisan gerrymander in violation of the state's constitution. In September 2025, the court ruled that a partisan map was constitutional, referencing Rucho v. Common Cause, and leaving the current map in place. Following Callais, Governor Henry McMaster called a special legislative session in May 2026 to consider redistricting and the state house approved a new map that would redraw the state's sole majority-minority district. However, the state senate ultimately voted against advancing the map after it became clear that passage would occur after the start of early voting in the state's primary election.	Steady	Steady	Steady
Tennessee	New districts enacted	After Callais, Tennessee redrew the sole majority-minority district in a special session.	▼1	Steady	▲1
Texas	New districts enacted	In League of United Latin American Citizens v. Abbott, held from May to June 2025 in the local U.S. District Court, plaintiffs argued that the congressional districts passed by the state legislature discriminated against Black and Latino voters in violation of the Voting Rights Act. In early 2025, the Trump Administration urged Texas officials to redraw congressional districts. This was followed by a meeting of the Texas Republican congressional delegation to discuss mid-decade redistricting to secure extra Republican seats. After Texas House Democrats staged a weeks-long walkout, a new map was enacted on August 29 with the goal of creating five new Republican seats. The previous case was paused, pending the new map. On November 18, the District Court issued a preliminary injunction blocking the new map, putting the former map back in place. The case on the 2021 map remained open, pending action from the U.S. Supreme Court in Callais. On November 21, the U.S. Supreme Court stayed the lower court ruling, temporarily leaving the new map in place. On December 4, the Supreme Court allowed the map to stand for the 2026 elections.	▼3	▼2	▲5
Utah	New districts enacted	In July 2023, in League of Women Voters v. Utah State Legislature, the Utah Supreme Court heard arguments alleging that the Utah Legislature violated a citizen-passed anti-gerrymandering proposition by dividing Salt Lake County voters into all four of Utah's districts. The case was sent back to a state district court, which ruled for the League of Women Voters on August 25, 2025. A new map was expected to be drawn up by the Legislature by September 24 and finalized by November. On October 6, the Utah Legislature passed a new map, which changed two Republican districts to be more competitive. On November 10, a Utah judge ruled that the new map also violated Proposition 4, opting to approve a plaintiff-submitted alternative, Map 1, which created a safe Democratic district comprising only Salt Lake County.	▲1	Steady	▼1
Virginia	Districts left in place	Democratic state lawmakers announced a plan to alter the state constitution to draw a new congressional map before the 2026 elections making 3–4 more Democratic seats. The proposed mechanism was an amendment to the Constitution of Virginia allowing the General Assembly to modify the state's congressional districts if any other state did so between January 1, 2025, and October 31, 2030, for any reason other than normal decennial redistricting or to satisfy a court order. Redistricting was transferred from the General Assembly to a bipartisan commission in 2020, and the power would revert to the commission for the normal 2030 cycle. The amendment proposal first passed the General Assembly on October 31, 2025. The amendment procedure requires any proposal to pass in both houses of the General Assembly, then it must pass both houses again after the next Virginia House of Delegates election is held (every two years), then it must be approved in a referendum. Virginia Senate minority leader Ryan McDougle, a Republican, sued Democratic House Speaker Don Scott over the legality of the amendment. On January 27, 2026, Tazewell County Circuit Court Judge Jack Hurley, Jr. ruled that the amendment could not satisfy the intervening-election requirement since early voting in the 2025 Virginia elections was underway at the time of passage. On January 28, the Democratic Party of Virginia appealed the ruling; the court of appeals, citing the importance of the case, forwarded it to the Supreme Court of Virginia for an expedited ruling on February 4. On February 10, the General Assembly passed the amendment proposal the required second time and included a draft map that would likely net Democrats four seats. On February 13, the Supreme Court allowed the April 21 referendum to go forward while it considered the matter. The referendum passed with 51.7% voting yes. The next day, the court ruled the referendum to be unconstitutional on the basis of another lawsuit and enjoined the state board of elections from certifying the result. Virginia Attorney General Jay Jones appealed the decision; the Supreme Court declined to stay it while the original case was ongoing and as a result the board was unable to certify the result at its May meeting. The Supreme Court heard oral arguments in the case on April 27. On May 8, the Supreme Court invalidated the amendment, agreeing with Judge Hurley's ruling that its first passage was too late to satisfy the intervening-election requirement. Following the ruling, Speaker Scott and Attorney General Jones filed an emergency appeal to the U.S. Supreme Court. On May 15, the Supreme Court denied the appeal.	Steady	Steady	Steady
Wisconsin	Districts left in place	In July 2025, a lawsuit was filed by two liberal law firms in a Wisconsin district court, asking to consider the constitutionality of Wisconsin's congressional maps. In September 2025, the Wisconsin Supreme court addressed this lawsuit and asked each party to provide briefs on whether this court case should proceed. On March 31, 2026, a judicial panel dismissed the challenge.	Steady	Steady	Steady
Net change			▲1	▼13	▲12

=== Newly created seats ===
The following districts had no incumbent representative as a result of redistricting.

1. Alabama 1
2. California 38
3. Florida 22
4. Texas 9
5. Texas 30
6. Texas 32
7. Texas 35
8. Utah 1

=== Seats with multiple incumbents running ===
The following districts will have multiple incumbent representatives running, a product of multiple districts merging in redistricting.

1. California 40: Ken Calvert (R) defeated Young Kim (R)
2. Texas 18: Christian Menefee (D) defeated Al Green (D)

== Closest races ==
One hundred twenty-six races were decided by a margin of 10% or lower

District	Winner	Margin
Minnesota 1st	Democratic (flip)	0.1%
North Carolina 3rd	Democratic (flip)	0.1%
North Carolina 5th	Democratic (flip)	0.1%
Tennessee 4th	Democratic (flip)	0.1%
Florida 27th	Republican	0.44%
Florida 7th	Republican	0.50%
Florida 9th	Democratic	0.54%
North Carolina 7th	Republican	0.7%
Florida 26th	Republican	0.73%
Florida 13th	Republican	0.78%
Colorado 4th	Democratic (flip)	0.9%
North Carolina 10th	Republican	0.9%
South Carolina 2nd	Republican	0.96%
Arizona 2nd	Republican	1.0%
South Carolina 1st	Democratic (flip)	1.03%
Tennessee 9th	Republican (flip)	1.1%
Oklahoma 5th	Republican	1.26%
New York 21st	Republican	1.5%
California 23rd	Republican	1.6%
Maine 2nd	Republican (flip)	1.6%
Virginia 5th	Republican	1.6%
Arkansas 2nd	Republican	1.62%
North Carolina 8th	Republican	1.7%
Ohio 10th	Democratic (flip)	1.7%
Colorado 3rd	Republican	1.8%
Michigan 4th	Democratic (flip)	1.8%
Texas 2nd	Republican	2.0%
Florida 4th	Republican	2.09%
New York 1st	Republican	2.2%
North Carolina 9th	Democratic (flip)	2.2%
North Carolina 14th	Democratic (flip)	2.2%
Tennessee 7th	Republican	2.2%
Arizona 8th	Republican	2.4%
North Carolina 6th	Democratic (flip)	2.4%
Texas 27th	Republican	2.4%
North Carolina 13th	Democratic (flip)	2.5%
Alaska at-large	Republican	2.8%
Georgia 1st	Republican	2.81%
Nebraska 1st	Republican	2.9%
Virginia 1st	Democratic (flip)	2.9%
Texas 5th	Republican	3.0%
Texas 32nd	Republican (flip)	3.0%
New York 2nd	Republican	3.1%
Michigan 7th	Democratic (flip)	3.3%
New Jersey 2nd	Democratic (flip)	3.3%
Tennessee 6th	Republican	3.3%
Arizona 5th	Republican	3.4%
Indiana 5th	Democratic (flip)	3.4%
North Carolina 1st	Democratic	3.4%
Florida 18th	Republican	3.63%
Texas 22nd	Republican	3.6%
Florida 22nd	Democratic	3.82%
Iowa 2nd	Democratic (flip)	3.9%
Montana 1st	Democratic (flip)	3.9%
Wisconsin 1st	Democratic (flip)	4.0%
Florida 2nd	Republican	4.16%
Georgia 12th	Republican	4.16%
Florida 16th	Republican	4.23%
Texas 38th	Republican	4.2%
Maryland 1st	Republican	4.4%
Ohio 8th	Republican	4.4%
Texas 6th	Republican	4.4%
Oklahoma 1st	Republican	4.61%
Florida 25th	Democratic	4.66%
Washington 5th	Republican	4.7%
California 7th	Democratic	4.8% (Note: Under California's "jungle primary" system, the general election was between two Democrats. The incumbent Democrat won re-election.)
Missouri 2nd	Democratic (flip)	4.9%
California 4th	Democratic	5.0% (Note: Under California's "jungle primary" system, the general election was between two Democrats. The incumbent Democrat lost re-election.)
California 40th	Republican	5.0% (Note: Under California's "jungle primary" system, the general election was between two incumbent Republicans. Incumbent Republican Young Kim lost re-election.)
Tennessee 5th	Republican	5.0%
Colorado 5th	Democratic (flip)	5.1%
Indiana 2nd	Republican	5.2%
Tennessee 8th	Republican	5.2%
Florida 14th	Democratic	5.37%
Ohio 9th	Democratic	5.4%
Texas 3rd	Republican	5.4%
South Carolina 5th	Republican	5.68%
Kansas 2nd	Republican	5.8%
Pennsylvania 1st	Democratic (flip)	5.8%
Nevada 2nd	Democratic (flip)	5.9%
South Carolina 4th	Republican	6.05%
Minnesota 8th	Republican	6.1%
New York 17th	Democratic (flip)	6.1%
Texas 12th	Republican	6.2%
Florida 8th	Republican	6.32%
Alabama 5th	Republican	6.4%
Texas 8th	Republican	6.4%
California 11th	Democratic	6.6% (Note: Under California's "jungle primary" system, the general election was between two Democrats.)
Wisconsin 3rd	Democratic (flip)	6.6%
Florida 12th	Republican	6.78%
Texas 24th	Republican	6.8%
Florida 11th	Republican	6.93%
Arizona 1st	Democratic (flip)	7.0%
Michigan 10th	Democratic (flip)	7.1%
Utah 2nd	Republican	7.1%
Iowa 3rd	Democratic (flip)	7.2%
Texas 17th	Republican	7.2%
Texas 36th	Republican	7.2%
Florida 28th	Republican	7.24%
Georgia 10th	Republican	7.28%
Ohio 15th	Democratic (flip)	7.3%
Texas 25th	Republican	7.4%
Alabama 2nd	Democratic	7.6%
Pennsylvania 16th	Republican	7.6%
Texas 10th	Republican	7.6%
Washington 4th	Republican	7.6%
Wisconsin 8th	Republican	7.8%
Texas 14th	Republican	8.0%
Arizona 6th	Democratic (flip)	8.1%
Texas 23rd	Democratic (flip)	8.1%
Washington 3rd	Democratic	8.3%
Indiana 4th	Republican	8.4%
Missouri 3rd	Republican	8.5%
Florida 15th	Republican	8.58%
Virginia 2nd	Democratic (flip)	8.9%
Kansas 4th	Republican	9.0%
Pennsylvania 8th	Democratic (flip)	9.0%
Texas 21st	Republican	9.0%
Texas 31st	Republican	9.0%
Florida 21st	Republican	9.07%
Kentucky 6th	Democratic (flip)	9.4%
Wisconsin 6th	Republican	9.5%
Iowa 1st	Democratic (flip)	9.6%
Michigan 1st	Republican	9.6%
Indiana 3rd	Republican	9.8%
Ohio 7th	Democratic (flip)	9.8%

== Polls and ratings ==
=== Generic congressional ballot aggregate polls ===
Source of poll aggregation	Dates administered	Dates updated	Republicans	Democrats	Other/ Undecided (Note: Calculated by taking the difference of 100% and all other candidates combined)	Margin
Decision Desk HQ	January 9, 2025 – November 1, 2026	November 3, 2026	42.8%	51.4%	5.8%	Democrats +8.6%
FiftyPlusOne	January 9, 2025 – November 1, 2026	November 3, 2026	44.1%	52.8%	3.1%	Democrats +8.6%
NBC News	January 9, 2025 – November 1, 2026	November 3, 2026	44.0%	52.0%	4.0%	Democrats +8.0%
RealClearPolitics	October 9 – November 1, 2026	November 3, 2026	43.3%	52.1%	4.6%	Democrats +8.8%
Silver Bulletin	January 9, 2025 – November 1, 2026	November 3, 2026	43.0%	51.8%	5.2%	Democrats +8.8%
Average		November 3, 2026	43.4%	52.0%	4.6%	Democrats +8.6%

== Exit poll ==
2026 U.S. House elections exit poll (Edison)
Response category	DEM	GOP	% of total vote
Total vote	56	42	100
Ideology
Liberals	97	2	26
Moderates	66	31	41
Conservatives	11	88	33
Party
Democrats	98	2	35
Republicans	6	93	32
Independents	59	37	33
Do you consider yourself MAGA?
Yes	3	96	24
No	73	25	76
Do you consider yourself a democratic socialist?
Yes	98	2	18
No	47	51	81
Donald Trump job approval?
Strongly approve	2	98	20
Somewhat approve	6	93	17
Somewhat disapprove	33	62	8
Strongly disapprove	94	4	55
2024 presidential vote
Kamala Harris	97	2	50
Donald Trump	7	91	43
Another candidate	58	29	2
Did not vote	71	25	4
Gender
Men	51	47	47
Women	60	39	53
Income
$200,000 or more	59	39	12
$100,000-$199,999	55	43	29
$50,000-$99,999	55	44	31
$30,000-$49,999	56	42	15
Less than $30,000	60	38	13
Race/ethnicity
White	50	49	73
Asian	72	27	4
Latino	65	33	10
Black	91	8	9
All other voters	55	42	5
White born-again or evangelical Christian?
Yes	17	82	17
No	64	34	83
Race by gender
White men	46	53	35
White women	53	45	38
Black men	87	12	4
Black women	93	6	5
Latino men	59	38	5
Latina women	69	29	5
All other voters	65	33	9
First-time voter?
Yes	66	32	9
No	55	43	91
Age
18–29 years old	74	24	11
30–44 years old	63	35	20
45-64 years old	53	46	34
65 and older	50	49	36
Area type
Urban	73	26	20
Suburban	60	39	45
Rural	42	56	35
Education
College graduate	64	34	47
No college degree	49	50	53
Education by race
White college graduates	61	38	35
Non-white college graduates	75	24	12
Whites without college	39	59	37
Non-whites without college	71	27	15
Education by gender and race
White women with college degrees	65	34	18
White women without college degrees	42	56	19
White men with college degrees	56	42	17
White men without college degrees	36	62	18
Voters of color	73	25	28
Educational attainment
Advanced degree	69	30	20
Bachelor's degree	61	37	27
Associate's degree	50	48	11
Some college education	51	47	19
Never attended college	45	53	23
Are you LGBTQ?
Yes	87	12	9
No	53	45	91
Union households
Yes	61	37	16
No	55	43	84
Military service
Veterans	42	56	10
Non-veterans	58	41	90
Region
Northeast	62	36	20
Midwest	53	45	22
South	51	48	34
West	62	36	24

== Special elections ==
There were six special elections held in 2026 to the 119th Congress, listed here by date and district. There was no party change in these elections.

Special elections during the 119th Congress Democratic hold Republican hold Vacant No election

District	Incumbent			This race	
District	Member	Party	First elected	Results	Candidates
Texas 18	Sylvester Turner	Democratic	2024	Incumbent died March 5, 2025. New member elected January 31, 2026, after no candidate received a majority vote in the November 4, 2025, jungle primary. Democratic hold.	▌ ✓ Christian Menefee (Democratic) 68.9%; ▌Amanda Edwards (Democratic) 31.1%
Georgia 14	Marjorie Taylor Greene	Republican	2020	Incumbent resigned January 5, 2026. New member elected April 7, 2026, after no candidate received a majority vote in the March 10, 2026, jungle primary. Republican hold.	▌ ✓ Clay Fuller (Republican) 55.9%; ▌Shawn Harris (Democratic) 44.1%
New Jersey 11	Mikie Sherrill	Democratic	2018	Incumbent resigned November 20, 2025, to become governor of New Jersey. New member elected April 16, 2026. Democratic hold.	▌ ✓ Analilia Mejia (Democratic) 60.2%; ▌Joe Hathaway (Republican) 39.4%; ▌Alan Bond (Independent) 0.5%
California 1	Doug LaMalfa	Republican	2012	Incumbent died January 6, 2026. New member elected June 2, 2026. Republican hold.	▌ ✓ James Gallagher (Republican) 62.1%; ▌Audrey Denney (Democratic) 18.5%; ▌Mike McGuire (Democratic) 17.3%; ▌Jot Thiara (Republican) 1.2%; ▌Richard Montgomery (Independent) 0.9%
California 14	Eric Swalwell	Democratic	2012	Incumbent resigned April 14, 2026, following sexual assault allegations. New member elected August 18, 2026, after no candidate received a majority vote in the June 16, 2026, jungle primary. Democratic hold.	▌ ✓ Aisha Wahab (Democratic) 53.1%; ▌Melissa Hernandez (Democratic) 46.9%
Georgia 13	David Scott	Democratic	2002	Incumbent died April 22, 2026. New member elected August 25, 2026, after no candidate received a majority vote in the July 28, 2026, jungle primary. Democratic hold.	▌ ✓ Everton Blair (Democratic) 53.9%; ▌Marcye Scott (Democratic) 46.1%

== Alabama ==
District		Incumbent			This race	
Location	PVI	Member	Party	First elected	Results	Candidates
Alabama 1	R+17	Barry Moore	Republican	2020	Incumbent retired to run for U.S. Senate. Republican hold.	▌ ✓ Jerry Carl (Republican); ▌Clyde Jones Jr. (Democratic)
Alabama 2	R+7	Shomari Figures	Democratic	2024	Incumbent re-elected.	▌ ✓ Shomari Figures (Democratic); ▌Rhett Marques (Republican)
Alabama 3	R+23	Mike Rogers	Republican	2002	Incumbent re-elected.	▌ ✓ Mike Rogers (Republican); ▌Lee McInnis (Democratic)
Alabama 4	R+33	Robert Aderholt	Republican	1996	Incumbent re-elected.	▌ ✓ Robert Aderholt (Republican); ▌Amanda Pusczek (Democratic)
Alabama 5	R+15	Dale Strong	Republican	2022	Incumbent re-elected.	▌ ✓ Dale Strong (Republican); ▌Andrew Sneed (Democratic)
Alabama 6	R+17	Gary Palmer	Republican	2014	Incumbent re-elected.	▌ ✓ Gary Palmer (Republican); ▌Maurice Mercer (Democratic)
Alabama 7	D+10	Terri Sewell	Democratic	2010	Incumbent re-elected.	▌ ✓ Terri Sewell (Democratic); ▌Ammie Akin (Republican)

== Alaska ==
District		Incumbent			This race	
Location	PVI	Member	Party	First elected	Results	Candidates
Alaska at-large	R+6	Nick Begich III	Republican	2024	Incumbent re-elected.	First round: ▌ Nick Begich III (Republican) 47.5%; ▌ Bill Hill (Independent) 41.8%; ▌Eric Hafner (Democratic) 7.9%; ▌Jim McDermott (Libertarian) 2.6%; Instant runoff: ▌ ✓ Nick Begich III (Republican) 51.4%; ▌Bill Hill (Independent) 48.6%

== Arizona ==
District		Incumbent			This race	
Location	PVI	Member	Party	First elected	Results	Candidates
Arizona 1	R+1	David Schweikert	Republican	2010	Incumbent retired to run for governor. Democratic gain.	▌ ✓ Amish Shah (Democratic); ▌Jay Feely (Republican); ▌Monica Alponte (Libertarian)
Arizona 2	R+7	Eli Crane	Republican	2022	Incumbent re-elected.	▌ ✓ Eli Crane (Republican); ▌Jonathan Nez (Democratic); ▌Curtis Goodwin (Libertarian)
Arizona 3	D+22	Yassamin Ansari	Democratic	2024	Incumbent re-elected.	▌ ✓ Yassamin Ansari (Democratic); ▌Alan Aversa (No Labels); ▌David Redkey (Green)
Arizona 4	D+4	Greg Stanton	Democratic	2018	Incumbent re-elected.	▌ ✓ Greg Stanton (Democratic); ▌Zuhdi Jasser (Republican); ▌Tisha Benoit (No Labels)
Arizona 5	R+10	Andy Biggs	Republican	2016	Incumbent retired to run for governor. Republican hold.	▌ ✓ Mark Lamb (Republican); ▌Elizabeth Lee (Democratic)
Arizona 6	EVEN	Juan Ciscomani	Republican	2022	Incumbent lost re-election. Democratic gain.	▌ ✓ JoAnna Mendoza (Democratic); ▌Juan Ciscomani (Republican); ▌Jereme Peters (Libertarian); ▌Gary Swing (Green)
Arizona 7	D+13	Adelita Grijalva	Democratic	2025 (special)	Incumbent re-elected.	▌ ✓ Adelita Grijalva (Democratic); ▌Daniel Butierez (Republican)
Arizona 8	R+8	Abraham Hamadeh	Republican	2024	Incumbent re-elected.	▌ ✓ Abraham Hamadeh (Republican); ▌Bernadette Greene-Placentia (Democratic)
Arizona 9	R+15	Paul Gosar	Republican	2010	Incumbent re-elected.	▌ ✓ Paul Gosar (Republican); ▌Dani Sterbinsky (Democratic)

== Arkansas ==
District		Incumbent			This race	
Location	PVI	Member	Party	First elected	Results	Candidates
Arkansas 1	R+23	Rick Crawford	Republican	2010	Incumbent re-elected.	▌ ✓ Rick Crawford (Republican) 65.4%; ▌Terri Green (Democratic) 31.0%; ▌Steve Parsons (Libertarian) 3.6%
Arkansas 2	R+8	French Hill	Republican	2014	Incumbent re-elected.	▌ ✓ French Hill (Republican) 50.8%; ▌Chris Jones (Democratic) 49.2%
Arkansas 3	R+13	Steve Womack	Republican	2010	Incumbent re-elected.	▌ ✓ Steve Womack (Republican) 54.8%; ▌Robb Ryerse (Democratic) 41.5%; ▌Bobby Wilson (Libertarian) 3.6%
Arkansas 4	R+20	Bruce Westerman	Republican	2014	Incumbent re-elected.	▌ ✓ Bruce Westerman (Republican) 65.5%; ▌James Russell (Democratic) 34.5%

== California ==
District		Incumbent			This race	
Location	PVI	Member	Party	First elected	Results	Candidates
California 1	D+7	James Gallagher	Republican	2026 (special)	Incumbent lost re-election. Democratic gain.	▌ ✓ Mike McGuire (Democratic); ▌James Gallagher (Republican)
California 2	D+13	Jared Huffman	Democratic	2012	Incumbent re-elected.	▌ ✓ Jared Huffman (Democratic); ▌Robin Littau (Republican)
California 3	D+6	Ami Bera; Redistricted from the 6th district	Democratic	2012	Incumbent re-elected.	▌ ✓ Ami Bera (Democratic); ▌Robb Tucker (Republican)
California 4	D+8	Mike Thompson	Democratic	1998	Incumbent lost re-election. Democratic hold.	▌ ✓ Eric Jones (Democratic); ▌Mike Thompson (Democratic)
California 5	R+10	Tom McClintock	Republican	2008	Incumbent re-elected.	▌ ✓ Tom McClintock (Republican); ▌Michael Masuda (Democratic)
California 6	D+5	Kevin Kiley; Redistricted from the 3rd district	Independent	2022	Incumbent lost re-election. Democratic gain.	▌ ✓ Richard Pan (Democratic); ▌Kevin Kiley (Independent)
California 7	D+7	Doris Matsui	Democratic	2005 (special)	Incumbent re-elected.	▌ ✓ Doris Matsui (Democratic); ▌Mai Vang (Democratic)
California 8	D+19	John Garamendi	Democratic	2009 (special)	Incumbent re-elected.	▌ ✓ John Garamendi (Democratic); ▌Rudy Recile (Republican)
California 9	D+8	Josh Harder	Democratic	2018	Incumbent re-elected.	▌ ✓ Josh Harder (Democratic); ▌John McBride (Republican)
California 10	D+18	Mark DeSaulnier	Democratic	2014	Incumbent re-elected.	▌ ✓ Mark DeSaulnier (Democratic); ▌Jeff Frese (Republican)
California 11	D+36	Nancy Pelosi	Democratic	1987 (special)	Incumbent retired. Democratic hold.	▌ ✓ Scott Wiener (Democratic); ▌Connie Chan (Democratic)
California 12	D+39	Lateefah Simon	Democratic	2024	Incumbent re-elected.	▌ ✓ Lateefah Simon (Democratic); ▌Jamie Joyce (Democratic)
California 13	D+2	Adam Gray	Democratic	2024	Incumbent re-elected.	▌ ✓ Adam Gray (Democratic); ▌Kevin Lincoln (Republican)
California 14	D+19	Aisha Wahab	Democratic	2026 (special)	Incumbent re-elected.	▌ ✓ Aisha Wahab (Democratic); ▌Melissa Hernandez (Democratic)
California 15	D+26	Kevin Mullin	Democratic	2022	Incumbent re-elected.	▌ ✓ Kevin Mullin (Democratic); ▌Charles Hoelter (Republican)
California 16	D+25	Sam Liccardo	Democratic	2024	Incumbent re-elected.	▌ ✓ Sam Liccardo (Democratic); ▌Peter Soulé (Republican)
California 17	D+21	Ro Khanna	Democratic	2016	Incumbent re-elected.	▌ ✓ Ro Khanna (Democratic); ▌Ritesh Tandon (Republican)
California 18	D+16	Zoe Lofgren	Democratic	1994	Incumbent re-elected.	▌ ✓ Zoe Lofgren (Democratic); ▌Shane Lewis (Republican)
California 19	D+18	Jimmy Panetta	Democratic	2016	Incumbent re-elected.	▌ ✓ Jimmy Panetta (Democratic); ▌Peter Coe Verbica (Republican)
California 20	R+16	Vince Fong	Republican	2024 (special)	Incumbent re-elected.	▌ ✓ Vince Fong (Republican); ▌Sandra Van Scotter (Democratic)
California 21	D+5	Jim Costa	Democratic	2004	Incumbent re-elected.	▌ ✓ Jim Costa (Democratic); ▌Kyle Kirkland (Republican)
California 22	D+1	David Valadao	Republican	2012; 2018 (lost); 2020	Incumbent lost re-election. Democratic gain.	▌ ✓ Randy Villegas (Democratic); ▌David Valadao (Republican)
California 23	R+9	Jay Obernolte	Republican	2020	Incumbent re-elected.	▌ ✓ Jay Obernolte (Republican); ▌Tessa Lynn Hodge (Democratic)
California 24	D+13	Salud Carbajal	Democratic	2016	Incumbent re-elected.	▌ ✓ Salud Carbajal (Democratic); ▌Bob Smith (Republican)
California 25	D+4	Raul Ruiz	Democratic	2012	Incumbent re-elected.	▌ ✓ Raul Ruiz (Democratic); ▌Joe Males (Republican)
California 26	D+9	Julia Brownley	Democratic	2012	Incumbent retired. Democratic hold.	▌ ✓ Jacqui Irwin (Democratic); ▌Sam Gallucci (Republican)
California 27	D+6	George T. Whitesides	Democratic	2024	Incumbent re-elected.	▌ ✓ George T. Whitesides (Democratic); ▌Jason Gibbs (Republican)
California 28	D+14	Judy Chu	Democratic	2009 (special)	Incumbent re-elected.	▌ ✓ Judy Chu (Democratic); ▌April Verlato (Republican)
California 29	D+19	Luz Rivas	Democratic	2024	Incumbent re-elected.	▌ ✓ Luz Rivas (Democratic); ▌Angelica Dueñas (Democratic)
California 30	D+21	Laura Friedman	Democratic	2024	Incumbent re-elected.	▌ ✓ Laura Friedman (Democratic); ▌Scott Meyers (Republican)
California 31	D+8	Gil Cisneros	Democratic	2018; 2020 (lost); 2024	Incumbent re-elected.	▌ ✓ Gil Cisneros (Democratic); ▌Eric Ching (Republican)
California 32	D+14	Brad Sherman	Democratic	1996	Incumbent re-elected.	▌ ✓ Brad Sherman (Democratic); ▌Larry Thompson (Republican)
California 33	D+7	Pete Aguilar	Democratic	2014	Incumbent re-elected.	▌ ✓ Pete Aguilar (Democratic); ▌Stephanie Vargas (Republican)
California 34	D+28	Jimmy Gomez	Democratic	2017 (special)	Incumbent lost re-election. Democratic hold.	▌ ✓ Angela Gonzales-Torres (Democratic); ▌Jimmy Gomez (Democratic)
California 35	D+6	Norma Torres	Democratic	2014	Incumbent re-elected.	▌ ✓ Norma Torres (Democratic); ▌Mike Cargile (Republican)
California 36	D+21	Ted Lieu	Democratic	2014	Incumbent re-elected.	▌ ✓ Ted Lieu (Democratic); ▌Houston Brignano (Republican)
California 37	D+33	Sydney Kamlager-Dove	Democratic	2022	Incumbent re-elected.	▌ ✓ Sydney Kamlager-Dove (Democratic); ▌Samantha Mota (Democratic)
California 38	D+8	None (new seat)			New member elected. Democratic gain.	▌ ✓ Hilda Solis (Democratic); ▌Pedro Casas (Republican)
California 39	D+7	Mark Takano	Democratic	2012	Incumbent re-elected.	▌ ✓ Mark Takano (Democratic); ▌Steve Manos (Republican)
California 40	R+6	Young Kim	Republican	2020	Incumbent lost re-election. Republican loss.	▌ ✓ Ken Calvert (Republican); ▌Young Kim (Republican)
California 40	R+6	Ken Calvert; Redistricted from the 41st district	Republican	1992	Incumbent re-elected.	▌ ✓ Ken Calvert (Republican); ▌Young Kim (Republican)
California 41	D+9	Linda Sánchez; Redistricted from the 38th district	Democratic	2002	Incumbent re-elected.	▌ ✓ Linda Sánchez (Democratic); ▌Mitch Clemmons (Republican)
California 42	D+8	Robert Garcia	Democratic	2022	Incumbent re-elected.	▌ ✓ Robert Garcia (Democratic); ▌Brian Burley (Republican)
California 43	D+27	Maxine Waters	Democratic	1990	Incumbent re-elected.	▌ ✓ Maxine Waters (Democratic); ▌Cristian Morales (Republican)
California 44	D+20	Nanette Barragán	Democratic	2016	Incumbent re-elected.	▌ ✓ Nanette Barragán (Democratic); ▌Genevieve Angel (Republican)
California 45	D+3	Derek Tran	Democratic	2024	Incumbent re-elected.	▌ ✓ Derek Tran (Democratic); ▌Chuong Vo (Republican)
California 46	D+10	Lou Correa	Democratic	2016	Incumbent re-elected.	▌ ✓ Lou Correa (Democratic); ▌David Pan (Republican)
California 47	D+6	Dave Min	Democratic	2024	Incumbent re-elected.	▌ ✓ Dave Min (Democratic); ▌Jenny Le Roux (Republican)
California 48	D+2	Darrell Issa	Republican	2000; 2018 (retired); 2020	Incumbent retired. Democratic gain.	▌ ✓ Marni von Wilpert (Democratic); ▌Jim Desmond (Republican)
California 49	D+7	Mike Levin	Democratic	2018	Incumbent re-elected.	▌ ✓ Mike Levin (Democratic); ▌Armen Kurdian (Republican)
California 50	D+10	Scott Peters	Democratic	2012	Incumbent re-elected.	▌ ✓ Scott Peters (Democratic); ▌Steve Cohen (Republican)
California 51	D+10	Sara Jacobs	Democratic	2020	Incumbent re-elected.	▌ ✓ Sara Jacobs (Democratic); ▌Ricardo Cabrera (Republican)
California 52	D+11	Juan Vargas	Democratic	2012	Incumbent re-elected.	▌ ✓ Juan Vargas (Democratic); ▌Jeff Belle (Republican)

== Colorado ==
District		Incumbent			This race	
Location	PVI	Member	Party	First elected	Results	Candidates
Colorado 1	D+29	Diana DeGette	Democratic	1996	Incumbent lost renomination. Democratic hold.	▌ ✓ Melat Kiros (Democratic); ▌Christy Peterson (Republican); ▌Shimon Blau (Independent); ▌Chad Humphrey (Libertarian); ▌Critter Milton (Unity)
Colorado 2	D+20	Joe Neguse	Democratic	2018	Incumbent re-elected.	▌ ✓ Joe Neguse (Democratic); ▌Kelley Dennison (Republican); ▌Gaylon Kent (Libertarian)
Colorado 3	R+5	Jeff Hurd	Republican	2024	Incumbent re-elected.	▌ ✓ Jeff Hurd (Republican); ▌Dwayne Romero (Democratic); ▌Cory Robertson (Libertarian); ▌Clifton Brown (Independent)
Colorado 4	R+9	Lauren Boebert	Republican	2020	Incumbent lost re-election. Democratic gain.	▌ ✓ Eileen Laubacher (Democratic); ▌Lauren Boebert (Republican); ▌Douglas Mangeris (Libertarian)
Colorado 5	R+5	Jeff Crank	Republican	2024	Incumbent lost re-election. Democratic gain.	▌ ✓ Jessica Killin (Democratic); ▌Jeff Crank (Republican); ▌Mark Elworth (Libertarian); ▌Christopher Mitchell (Constitution)
Colorado 6	D+11	Jason Crow	Democratic	2018	Incumbent re-elected.	▌ ✓ Jason Crow (Democratic); ▌Jason Clark (Republican); ▌Patty McMahon (Libertarian); ▌Samir Ezzeldin Witta (Independent); ▌Meredith Ryan (Unity)
Colorado 7	D+8	Brittany Pettersen	Democratic	2022	Incumbent re-elected.	▌ ✓ Brittany Pettersen (Democratic); ▌Tim Bennett (Republican); ▌Joe Krzeczkowski (Independent); ▌Dan Sallis (Libertarian); ▌Susan Hall (Unity); ▌Lawrence Clark (Constitution)
Colorado 8	EVEN	Gabe Evans	Republican	2024	Incumbent lost re-election. Democratic gain.	▌ ✓ Manny Rutinel (Democratic); ▌Gabe Evans (Republican); ▌Dave Wood (Libertarian)

== Connecticut ==
District		Incumbent			This race	
Location	PVI	Member	Party	First elected	Results	Candidates
Connecticut 1	D+12	John B. Larson	Democratic	1998	Incumbent lost renomination. Democratic hold.	▌ ✓ Luke Bronin (Democratic); ▌Amy Chai (Republican); ▌Mary Sanders (Green)
Connecticut 2	D+4	Joe Courtney	Democratic	2006	Incumbent re-elected.	▌ ✓ Joe Courtney (Democratic); ▌▌George Austin (Republican/IPC)
Connecticut 3	D+8	Rosa DeLauro	Democratic	1990	Incumbent re-elected.	▌ ✓ Rosa DeLauro (Democratic); ▌Chris Lancia (Republican); ▌Thomas Egan (Independent)
Connecticut 4	D+13	Jim Himes	Democratic	2008	Incumbent re-elected.	▌ ✓ Jim Himes (Democratic); ▌Michael Goldstein (Republican); ▌Benjamin Wesley (Independent)
Connecticut 5	D+3	Jahana Hayes	Democratic	2018	Incumbent re-elected.	▌▌ ✓ Jahana Hayes (Democratic/WFP); ▌Chris Shea (Republican)

== Delaware ==
District		Incumbent			This race	
Location	PVI	Member	Party	First elected	Results	Candidates
Delaware at-large	D+8	Sarah McBride	Democratic	2024	Incumbent re-elected.	▌ ✓ Sarah McBride (Democratic) 64.3%; ▌Joseph Arminio (Republican) 35.6%

== Florida ==
District		Incumbent			This race	
Location	PVI	Member	Party	First elected	Results	Candidates
Florida 1	R+18	Jimmy Patronis	Republican	2025 (special)	Incumbent re-elected.	▌ ✓ Jimmy Patronis (Republican) 62.5%; ▌Gay Valimont (Democratic) 35.7%; ▌Tyler Davis (Independent) 1.8%
Florida 2	R+8	Neal Dunn	Republican	2016	Incumbent retired. Republican hold.	▌ ✓ Austin Rogers (Republican) 52.1%; ▌Amanda Green (Democratic) 47.9%
Florida 3	R+10	Kat Cammack	Republican	2020	Incumbent re-elected.	▌ ✓ Kat Cammack (Republican) 55.1%; ▌Seth Harp (Democratic) 43.0%; ▌Mike Klein (Independent) 1.9%
Florida 4	R+5	Aaron Bean	Republican	2022	Incumbent re-elected.	▌ ✓ Aaron Bean (Republican) 50.2%; ▌LaShonda Holloway (Democratic) 48.1%; ▌Todd Schaefer (Independent) 1.1%; ▌Mike Sell (Florida Forward) 0.6%
Florida 5	R+10	John Rutherford	Republican	2016	Incumbent re-elected.	▌ ✓ John Rutherford (Republican) 56.4%; ▌Rachel Grage (Democratic) 43.6%
Florida 6	R+14	Randy Fine	Republican	2025 (special)	Incumbent re-elected.	▌ ✓ Randy Fine (Republican) 58.9%; ▌Eric Yonce (Democratic) 39.9%; ▌Andrew Parrott (Libertarian) 1.1%
Florida 7	R+5	Cory Mills	Republican	2022	Incumbent lost renomination. Republican hold.	▌ ✓ Ryan Elijah (Republican) 49.7%; ▌Bale Dalton (Democratic) 49.2%; ▌Christopher Dennison (Libertarian) 1.1%
Florida 8	R+8	Mike Haridopolos	Republican	2024	Incumbent re-elected.	▌ ✓ Mike Haridopolos (Republican) 53.2%; ▌Jennifer Jenkins (Democratic) 46.8%
Florida 9	R+8	Darren Soto	Democratic	2016	Incumbent re-elected.	▌ ✓ Darren Soto (Democratic) 50.3%; ▌Dan Green (Republican) 49.7%
Florida 10	D+13	Maxwell Frost	Democratic	2022	Incumbent re-elected.	▌ ✓ Maxwell Frost (Democratic) Uncontested
Florida 11	R+7	Daniel Webster	Republican	2010	Incumbent retired. Republican hold.	▌ ✓ Joe Strada (Republican) 52.9%; ▌James Pericola (Democratic) 46.0%; ▌Ralph Groves (Libertarian) 1.1%
Florida 12	R+7	Gus Bilirakis	Republican	2006	Incumbent re-elected.	▌ ✓ Gus Bilirakis (Republican) 52.7%; ▌Kimberly Overman (Democratic) 45.9%; ▌Branden Scrivener (Independent) 1.3%
Florida 13	R+6	Anna Paulina Luna	Republican	2022	Incumbent re-elected.	▌ ✓ Anna Paulina Luna (Republican) 49.5%; ▌Leela Gray (Democratic) 48.7%; ▌Tony D'Arrigo (Independent) 1.8%
Florida 14	R+4	Kathy Castor	Democratic	2006	Incumbent re-elected.	▌ ✓ Kathy Castor (Democratic) 51.2%; ▌Mike Beltran (Republican) 45.9%; ▌Brian Lambert (Libertarian) 2.9%
Florida 15	R+9	Laurel Lee	Republican	2022	Incumbent re-elected.	▌ ✓ Laurel Lee (Republican) 54.3%; ▌Robert People (Democratic) 45.7%
Florida 16	R+6	Vern Buchanan	Republican	2006	Incumbent retired. Republican hold.	▌ ✓ Sydney Gruters (Republican) 51.2%; ▌Kelly Kirschner (Democratic) 47.0%; ▌Mark Davis (Independent) 1.8%
Florida 17	R+10	Greg Steube	Republican	2018	Incumbent re-elected.	▌ ✓ Greg Steube (Republican) 58.4%; ▌Matthew Montavon (Democratic) 40.2%; ▌Michael Quirk (Independent) 1.4%
Florida 18	R+8	Scott Franklin	Republican	2020	Incumbent re-elected.	▌ ✓ Scott Franklin (Republican) 50.3%; ▌Curtis Gibson (Democratic) 46.7%; ▌Deva Simmons (Independent) 3.0%
Florida 19	R+14	Byron Donalds	Republican	2020	Incumbent retired to run for governor. Republican hold.	▌ ✓ Jim Schwartzel (Republican) 61.1%; ▌Victor Arias (Democratic) 37.7%; ▌Seth Haskin (Independent) 1.2%
Florida 20	D+20	Vacant			Rep. Sheila Cherfilus-McCormick (D) resigned April 21, 2026. Democratic loss.	▌ ✓ Debbie Wasserman Schultz (Democratic) 74.4%; ▌Brent Andersen (Republican) 21.7%; ▌Kedner Maxime (IPF) 3.9%
Florida 20	D+20	Debbie Wasserman Schultz; Redistricted from the 25th district	Democratic	2004	Incumbent re-elected.	▌ ✓ Debbie Wasserman Schultz (Democratic) 74.4%; ▌Brent Andersen (Republican) 21.7%; ▌Kedner Maxime (IPF) 3.9%
Florida 21	R+7	Brian Mast	Republican	2016	Incumbent re-elected.	▌ ✓ Brian Mast (Republican) 53.9%; ▌James Martin (Democratic) 44.8%; ▌Alexander Cooke (Independent) 1.3%
Florida 22	R+4	None (new seat)			New member elected. Democratic gain.	▌ ✓ Pia Dandiya (Democratic) 51.9%; ▌Casey Askar (Republican) 48.1%
Florida 23	D+9	Lois Frankel; Redistricted from the 22nd district	Democratic	2012	Incumbent re-elected.	▌ ✓ Lois Frankel (Democratic) 65.7%; ▌Deborah Adeimy (Republican) 34.3%
Florida 24	D+22	Frederica Wilson	Democratic	2010	Incumbent retired. Democratic hold.	▌ ✓ Oliver Gilbert (Democratic) 80.6%; ▌Te Mayonna Brown (Republican) 19.3%
Florida 25	R+3	Jared Moskowitz; Redistricted from the 23rd district	Democratic	2022	Incumbent re-elected.	▌ ✓ Jared Moskowitz (Democratic) 51.3%; ▌Scott Singer (Republican) 46.6%; ▌Peter Jassenoff (Libertarian) 2.1%
Florida 26	R+7	Mario Díaz-Balart	Republican	2002	Incumbent re-elected.	▌ ✓ Mario Díaz-Balart (Republican) 49.9%; ▌Nicole Locklin (Democratic) 49.1%; ▌Deborah Meidinger Hosey (Independent) 1.0%
Florida 27	R+6	María Elvira Salazar	Republican	2020	Incumbent re-elected.	▌ ✓ María Elvira Salazar (Republican) 50.2%; ▌Eliott Rodriguez (Democratic) 49.8%
Florida 28	R+10	Carlos A. Gimenez	Republican	2020	Incumbent re-elected.	▌ ✓ Carlos A. Gimenez (Republican) 52.9%; ▌Phil Ehr (Democratic) 45.7%; ▌Eddy Rojas (Independent) 1.5%

== Georgia ==
District		Incumbent			This race	
Location	PVI	Member	Party	First elected	Results	Candidates
Georgia 1	R+8	Buddy Carter	Republican	2014	Incumbent retired to run for U.S. Senate. Republican hold.	▌ ✓ Jim Kingston (Republican) 51.4%; ▌Amanda Hollowell (Democratic) 48.6%
Georgia 2	D+4	Sanford Bishop	Democratic	1992	Incumbent re-elected.	▌ ✓ Sanford Bishop (Democratic) 60.8%; ▌Matt Day (Republican) 39.2%
Georgia 3	R+15	Brian Jack	Republican	2024	Incumbent re-elected.	▌ ✓ Brian Jack (Republican) 58.6%; ▌Maura Keller (Democratic) 41.4%
Georgia 4	D+27	Hank Johnson	Democratic	2006	Incumbent re-elected.	▌ ✓ Hank Johnson (Democratic) 82.6%; ▌James Duffie (Republican) 17.4%
Georgia 5	D+36	Nikema Williams	Democratic	2020	Incumbent re-elected.	▌ ✓ Nikema Williams (Democratic) 90.2%; ▌John Salvesen (Republican) 9.8%
Georgia 6	D+25	Lucy McBath	Democratic	2018	Incumbent re-elected.	▌ ✓ Lucy McBath (Democratic) 80.9%; ▌Kevin Martin (Republican) 19.1%
Georgia 7	R+11	Rich McCormick	Republican	2022	Incumbent re-elected.	▌ ✓ Rich McCormick (Republican) 56.2%; ▌Tony Kozycki (Democratic) 43.8%
Georgia 8	R+15	Austin Scott	Republican	2010	Incumbent re-elected.	▌ ✓ Austin Scott (Republican) 60.4%; ▌Kelly Esti (Democratic) 39.6%
Georgia 9	R+17	Andrew Clyde	Republican	2020	Incumbent re-elected.	▌ ✓ Andrew Clyde (Republican) 59.3%; ▌Caitlyn Gegen (Democratic) 40.7%
Georgia 10	R+11	Mike Collins	Republican	2022	Incumbent retired to run for U.S. Senate. Republican hold.	▌ ✓ Houston Gaines (Republican) 53.6%; ▌Pam Delancy (Democratic) 46.4%
Georgia 11	R+12	Barry Loudermilk	Republican	2014	Incumbent retired. Republican hold.	▌ ✓ John Cowan (Republican) 55.3%; ▌Chris Harden (Democratic) 44.6%
Georgia 12	R+7	Rick Allen	Republican	2014	Incumbent re-elected.	▌ ✓ Rick Allen (Republican) 52.1%; ▌Ceretta Smith (Democratic) 47.9%
Georgia 13	D+21	Everton Blair	Democratic	2026 (special)	Incumbent lost nomination. Democratic hold.	▌ ✓ Jasmine Clark (Democratic) 79.8%; ▌Jonathan Chavez (Republican) 20.2%
Georgia 14	R+19	Clay Fuller	Republican	2026 (special)	Incumbent re-elected.	▌ ✓ Clay Fuller (Republican) 58.8%; ▌Shawn Harris (Democratic) 41.2%

== Hawaii ==
District		Incumbent			This race	
Location	PVI	Member	Party	First elected	Results	Candidates
Hawaii 1	D+13	Ed Case	Democratic	2002 (special); 2006 (retired); 2018	Incumbent re-elected.	▌ ✓ Ed Case (Democratic) 71.8%; ▌Adriel Lam (Republican) 22.9%; ▌Jordan Conley (Green) 4.0%; ▌Nathan Berning (Independent) 1.3%
Hawaii 2	D+12	Jill Tokuda	Democratic	2022	Incumbent re-elected.	▌ ✓ Jill Tokuda (Democratic) 66.5%; ▌Brenton Awa (Republican) 33.5%

== Idaho ==
District		Incumbent			This race	
Location	PVI	Member	Party	First elected	Results	Candidates
Idaho 1	R+22	Russ Fulcher	Republican	2018	Incumbent re-elected.	▌ ✓ Russ Fulcher (Republican) 64.2%; ▌Kaylee Peterson (Democratic) 28.9%; ▌Sarah Zabel (Independent) 6.1%; ▌Brendan Gomez (Constitution) 0.9%
Idaho 2	R+13	Mike Simpson	Republican	1998	Incumbent re-elected.	▌ ✓ Mike Simpson (Republican) 51.7%; ▌Ellie Gilbreath (Democratic) 40.3%; ▌Tripp Hutchinson (Independent) 3.5%; ▌Emre Houser (Independent) 2.4%; ▌Will Johanson (Libertarian) 2.2%

== Illinois ==
District		Incumbent			This race	
Location	PVI	Member	Party	First elected	Results	Candidates
Illinois 1	D+18	Jonathan Jackson	Democratic	2022	Incumbent re-elected.	▌ ✓ Jonathan Jackson (Democratic); ▌Christian Maxwell (Republican)
Illinois 2	D+18	Robin Kelly	Democratic	2013 (special)	Incumbent retired to run for U.S. Senate. Democratic hold.	▌ ✓ Donna Miller (Democratic); ▌Michael Noack (Republican)
Illinois 3	D+17	Delia Ramirez	Democratic	2022	Incumbent re-elected.	▌ ✓ Delia Ramirez (Democratic); ▌Angel Oakley (Republican)
Illinois 4	D+17	Chuy García	Democratic	2018	Incumbent retired. Democratic hold.	▌ ✓ Patty García (Democratic); ▌Lupe Castillo (Republican); ▌Chris Getty (Independent); ▌Ed Hershey (Working Class)
Illinois 5	D+19	Mike Quigley	Democratic	2009 (special)	Incumbent re-elected.	▌ ✓ Mike Quigley (Democratic); ▌Tommy Hanson (Republican)
Illinois 6	D+3	Sean Casten	Democratic	2018	Incumbent re-elected.	▌ ✓ Sean Casten (Democratic); ▌Niki Conforti (Republican)
Illinois 7	D+34	Danny Davis	Democratic	1996	Incumbent retired. Democratic hold.	▌ ✓ La Shawn Ford (Democratic); ▌Chad Koppie (Republican)
Illinois 8	D+5	Raja Krishnamoorthi	Democratic	2016	Incumbent retired to run for U.S. Senate. Democratic hold.	▌ ✓ Melissa Bean (Democratic); ▌Jennifer Davis (Republican)
Illinois 9	D+19	Jan Schakowsky	Democratic	1998	Incumbent retired. Democratic hold.	▌ ✓ Daniel Biss (Democratic); ▌John Elleson (Republican)
Illinois 10	D+12	Brad Schneider	Democratic	2012; 2014 (lost); 2016	Incumbent re-elected.	▌ ✓ Brad Schneider (Democratic); ▌Carl Lambrecht (Republican)
Illinois 11	D+6	Bill Foster	Democratic	2008 (special); 2010 (lost); 2012	Incumbent re-elected.	▌ ✓ Bill Foster (Democratic); ▌Jeff Walter (Republican)
Illinois 12	R+22	Mike Bost	Republican	2014	Incumbent re-elected.	▌ ✓ Mike Bost (Republican); ▌Julie Fortier (Democratic)
Illinois 13	D+5	Nikki Budzinski	Democratic	2022	Incumbent re-elected.	▌ ✓ Nikki Budzinski (Democratic); ▌Jeff Wilson (Republican)
Illinois 14	D+3	Lauren Underwood	Democratic	2018	Incumbent re-elected.	▌ ✓ Lauren Underwood (Democratic); ▌James Marter (Republican)
Illinois 15	R+20	Mary Miller	Republican	2020	Incumbent re-elected.	▌ ✓ Mary Miller (Republican); ▌Jennifer Todd (Democratic)
Illinois 16	R+11	Darin LaHood	Republican	2015 (special)	Incumbent re-elected.	▌ ✓ Darin LaHood (Republican); ▌Paul Nolley (Democratic)
Illinois 17	D+3	Eric Sorensen	Democratic	2022	Incumbent re-elected.	▌ ✓ Eric Sorensen (Democratic); ▌Dillan Vancil (Republican)

== Indiana ==
District		Incumbent			This race	
Location	PVI	Member	Party	First elected	Results	Candidates
Indiana 1	D+1	Frank J. Mrvan	Democratic	2020	Incumbent re-elected.	▌ ✓ Frank J. Mrvan (Democratic); ▌Barb Regnitz (Republican)
Indiana 2	R+13	Rudy Yakym	Republican	2022 (special)	Incumbent re-elected.	▌ ✓ Rudy Yakym (Republican); ▌Jamee Decio (Democratic); ▌William Henry (Libertarian)
Indiana 3	R+16	Marlin Stutzman	Republican	2010 (special); 2016 (retired); 2024	Incumbent re-elected.	▌ ✓ Marlin Stutzman (Republican); ▌Kelly Thompson (Democratic)
Indiana 4	R+15	Jim Baird	Republican	2018	Incumbent re-elected.	▌ ✓ Jim Baird (Republican); ▌Drew Cox (Democratic)
Indiana 5	R+8	Victoria Spartz	Republican	2020	Incumbent lost re-election. Democratic gain.	▌ ✓ J. D. Ford (Democratic); ▌Victoria Spartz (Republican)
Indiana 6	R+16	Jefferson Shreve	Republican	2024	Incumbent re-elected.	▌ ✓ Jefferson Shreve (Republican); ▌Cinde Wirth (Democratic)
Indiana 7	D+21	André Carson	Democratic	2008 (special)	Incumbent re-elected.	▌ ✓ André Carson (Democratic); ▌Patrick McAuley (Republican); ▌James Sceniak (Libertarian)
Indiana 8	R+18	Mark Messmer	Republican	2024	Incumbent re-elected.	▌ ✓ Mark Messmer (Republican); ▌Mary Allen (Democratic)
Indiana 9	R+15	Erin Houchin	Republican	2022	Incumbent re-elected.	▌ ✓ Erin Houchin (Republican); ▌Brad Meyer (Democratic); ▌Tonya Hudson (Libertarian)

== Iowa ==
District		Incumbent			This race	
Location	PVI	Member	Party	First elected	Results	Candidates
Iowa 1	R+4	Mariannette Miller-Meeks	Republican	2020	Incumbent lost re-election. Democratic gain.	▌ ✓ Christina Bohannan (Democratic); ▌Mariannette Miller-Meeks (Republican); ▌Michael Bridgford (Independent)
Iowa 2	R+4	Ashley Hinson	Republican	2020	Incumbent retired to run for U.S. Senate. Democratic gain.	▌ ✓ Lindsay James (Democratic); ▌Joe Mitchell (Republican); ▌Rick Stewart (Libertarian); ▌Dave Bushaw (Independent)
Iowa 3	R+2	Zach Nunn	Republican	2022	Incumbent lost re-election. Democratic gain.	▌ ✓ Sarah Trone Garriott (Democratic); ▌Zach Nunn (Republican)
Iowa 4	R+15	Randy Feenstra	Republican	2020	Incumbent retired to run for governor. Republican hold.	▌ ✓ Chris McGowan (Republican); ▌David Dawson (Democratic)

== Kansas ==
District		Incumbent			This race	
Location	PVI	Member	Party	First elected	Results	Candidates
Kansas 1	R+16	Tracey Mann	Republican	2020	Incumbent re-elected.	▌ ✓ Tracey Mann (Republican) 59.2%; ▌Lauren Reinhold (Democratic) 38.1%; ▌Steven Jacob (Libertarian) 2.7%
Kansas 2	R+10	Derek Schmidt	Republican	2024	Incumbent re-elected.	▌ ✓ Derek Schmidt (Republican) 51.0%; ▌Don Coover (Democratic) 45.2%; ▌John Hauer (Libertarian) 3.8%
Kansas 3	D+2	Sharice Davids	Democratic	2018	Incumbent re-elected.	▌ ✓ Sharice Davids (Democratic) 59.6%; ▌Eric Jenkins (Republican) 38.3%; ▌Steven Hohe (Libertarian) 2.1%
Kansas 4	R+12	Ron Estes	Republican	2017 (special)	Incumbent re-elected.	▌ ✓ Ron Estes (Republican) 53.3%; ▌Katy Tyndell (Democratic) 44.3%; ▌Drew Cranmer (Libertarian) 2.4%

== Kentucky ==
District		Incumbent			This race	
Location	PVI	Member	Party	First elected	Results	Candidates
Kentucky 1	R+23	James Comer	Republican	2016 (special)	Incumbent re-elected.	▌ ✓ James Comer (Republican) 67.6%; ▌Drew Williams (Democratic) 32.4%
Kentucky 2	R+20	Brett Guthrie	Republican	2008	Incumbent re-elected.	▌ ✓ Brett Guthrie (Republican) 62.8%; ▌Megan Wingfield (Democratic) 35.1%; ▌Thomas Loecken (Independent) 2.1%
Kentucky 3	D+10	Morgan McGarvey	Democratic	2022	Incumbent re-elected.	▌ ✓ Morgan McGarvey (Democratic) 70.3%; ▌Maria Rodriquez (Republican) 29.7%
Kentucky 4	R+18	Thomas Massie	Republican	2012 (special)	Incumbent lost renomination. Republican hold.	▌ ✓ Ed Gallrein (Republican) 54.2%; ▌Melissa Strange (Democratic) 40.9%; ▌Jeremy Todd (Libertarian) 4.9%
Kentucky 5	R+32	Hal Rogers	Republican	1980	Incumbent re-elected.	▌ ✓ Hal Rogers (Republican) 71.2%; ▌Ned Pillersdorf (Democratic) 25.3%; ▌Mikel Wein (Independent) 2.1%; ▌Gerardo Serrano (Independent) 1.4%
Kentucky 6	R+7	Andy Barr	Republican	2012	Incumbent retired to run for U.S. Senate. Democratic gain.	▌ ✓ Zach Dembo (Democratic) 52.7%; ▌Ralph Alvarado (Republican) 43.3%; ▌Jay Bowman (Independent) 2.5%; ▌Pete Lynch (Kentucky) 1.5%

== Louisiana ==
District		Incumbent			This race	
Location	PVI	Member	Party	First elected	Results	Candidates
Louisiana 1	R+20	Steve Scalise	Republican	2008 (special)	Incumbent re-elected.	▌ ✓ Steve Scalise (Republican) 60.7%; ▌Lauren Jewett (Democratic) 34.0%; ▌Randall Arrington (Republican) 3.7%; ▌Liddy Glass (Independent) 1.6%
Louisiana 2	D+25	Troy Carter	Democratic	2021 (special)	Incumbent re-elected.	▌ ✓ Troy Carter (Democratic) 79.9%; ▌Peter Williams (Republican) 15.1%; ▌Lisa Ballay (Libertarian) 2.7%; ▌Renada Collins (Democratic) 1.2%; ▌Walter Beach (Independent) 1.1%
Louisiana 3	R+18	Clay Higgins	Republican	2016	Incumbent re-elected.	▌ ✓ Clay Higgins (Republican) 55.0%; ▌John Day (Democratic) 20.9%; ▌Caleb Walker (Democratic) 8.5%; ▌Priscilla Gonzalez (Democratic) 7.2%; ▌Kate Cotten (Republican) 6.7%; ▌Tia LeBrun (Democratic) 1.8%
Louisiana 4	R+17	Mike Johnson	Republican	2016	Incumbent re-elected.	▌ ✓ Mike Johnson (Republican) 58.5%; ▌Conrad Cable (Democratic) 23.0%; ▌Matt Gromlich (Democratic) 14.3%; ▌Mike Nichols (Republican) 3.2%; ▌Gordon Heslop (Republican) 1.1%
Louisiana 5	R+17	Julia Letlow	Republican	2021 (special)	Incumbent retired to run for U.S. Senate.	General election: ▌ Patricia Moore (Democratic) 17.9%; ▌ Gabe Firment (Republican) 17.2%; ▌Misti Cordell (Republican) 14.6%; ▌Michael Echols (Republican) 14.4%; ▌Stewart Cathey Jr. (Republican) 12.4%; ▌Antonio Wilson (Democratic) 12.0%; ▌Dan McKay (Democratic) 7.0%; ▌Austin Magee (Republican) 3.5%; ▌Omar Dantzler (Republican) 1.0%; Runoff: ▌Gabe Firment (Republican); ▌Patricia Moore (Democratic)
Louisiana 6	R+16	Cleo Fields	Democratic	1992; 1996 (retired); 2024	Incumbent retired to run for Louisiana State Senate.	General election: ▌ Chauna Banks (Democratic) 19.4%; ▌ Blake Miguez (Republican) 19.2%; ▌Rick Edmonds (Republican) 18.8%; ▌Rubia Garcia (Democratic) 12.8%; ▌Stephen Wagley (Republican) 10.7%; ▌Pat Forbes (Democratic) 9.1%; ▌Larry Davis (Republican) 4.3%; ▌Monique Appeaning (Republican) 3.1%; ▌Rufus Craig (Libertarian) 1.3%; ▌Michael Mebruer (Republican) 1.2%; Runoff: ▌Chauna Banks (Democratic); ▌Blake Miguez (Republican)

== Maine ==
District		Incumbent			This race	
Location	PVI	Member	Party	First elected	Results	Candidates
Maine 1	D+11	Chellie Pingree	Democratic	2008	Incumbent re-elected.	▌ ✓ Chellie Pingree (Democratic); ▌Ronald Russell (Republican)
Maine 2	R+4	Jared Golden	Democratic	2018	Incumbent retired. Republican gain.	▌ ✓ Paul LePage (Republican); ▌Matthew Dunlap (Democratic)

== Maryland ==
District		Incumbent			This race	
Location	PVI	Member	Party	First elected	Results	Candidates
Maryland 1	R+8	Andy Harris	Republican	2010	Incumbent re-elected.	▌ ✓ Andy Harris (Republican) 52.1%; ▌Dan Schwartz (Democratic) 47.7%
Maryland 2	D+10	Johnny Olszewski	Democratic	2024	Incumbent re-elected.	▌ ✓ Johnny Olszewski (Democratic) 65.0%; ▌Dave Wallace (Republican) 34.8%
Maryland 3	D+12	Sarah Elfreth	Democratic	2024	Incumbent re-elected.	▌ ✓ Sarah Elfreth (Democratic) 67.7%; ▌Berney Flowers (Republican) 32.0%
Maryland 4	D+39	Glenn Ivey	Democratic	2022	Incumbent re-elected.	▌ ✓ Glenn Ivey (Democratic); ▌George McDermott (Republican); ▌Sam Husseini (Green)
Maryland 5	D+17	Steny Hoyer	Democratic	1981 (special)	Incumbent retiring. Democratic hold.	▌ ✓ Adrian Boafo (Democratic); ▌Chris Chaffee (Republican)
Maryland 6	D+3	April McClain Delaney	Democratic	2024	Incumbent re-elected.	▌ ✓ April McClain Delaney (Democratic) 59.3%; ▌Robin Ficker (Republican) 37.6%; ▌Moshe Landman (Green) 2.8%
Maryland 7	D+31	Kweisi Mfume	Democratic	1986; 1996 (resigned); 2020 (special)	Incumbent re-elected.	▌ ✓ Kweisi Mfume (Democratic) 85.1%; ▌Scott Collier (Republican) 14.5%
Maryland 8	D+30	Jamie Raskin	Democratic	2016	Incumbent re-elected.	▌ ✓ Jamie Raskin (Democratic); ▌Cheryl Riley (Republican); ▌Nancy Wallace (Green)

== Massachusetts ==
District		Incumbent			This race	
Location	PVI	Member	Party	First elected	Results	Candidates
Massachusetts 1	D+8	Richard Neal	Democratic	1988	Incumbent re-elected.	▌ ✓ Richard Neal (Democratic) 65.0%; ▌Nadia Milleron (Independent) 34.2%
Massachusetts 2	D+13	Jim McGovern	Democratic	1996	Incumbent re-elected.	▌ ✓ Jim McGovern (Democratic)
Massachusetts 3	D+11	Lori Trahan	Democratic	2018	Incumbent re-elected.	▌ ✓ Lori Trahan (Democratic) 67.3%; ▌Gary Grossi (Republican) 30.1%; ▌Dennis Conlon (Independent) 2.5%
Massachusetts 4	D+11	Jake Auchincloss	Democratic	2020	Incumbent re-elected.	▌ ✓ Jake Auchincloss (Democratic) 66.5%; ▌Thomas Stalcup (Republican) 33.1%
Massachusetts 5	D+24	Katherine Clark	Democratic	2013 (special)	Incumbent re-elected.	▌ ✓ Katherine Clark (Democratic)
Massachusetts 6	D+11	Seth Moulton	Democratic	2014	Incumbent retired to run for U.S. Senate. Democratic hold.	▌ ✓ Dan Koh (Democratic) 63.4%; ▌Micah Jones (Republican) 36.5%
Massachusetts 7	D+34	Ayanna Pressley	Democratic	2018	Incumbent re-elected.	▌ ✓ Ayanna Pressley (Democratic)
Massachusetts 8	D+15	Stephen Lynch	Democratic	2001 (special)	Incumbent re-elected.	▌ ✓ Stephen Lynch (Democratic) 69.7%; ▌Robert Burke (Republican) 26.3%; ▌Rasheed Walters (Independent) 3.8%
Massachusetts 9	D+6	Bill Keating	Democratic	2010	Incumbent re-elected.	▌ ✓ Bill Keating (Democratic) 60.9%; ▌Tyler MacAllister (Republican) 39.0%

== Michigan ==
District		Incumbent			This race	
Location	PVI	Member	Party	First elected	Results	Candidates
Michigan 1	R+11	Jack Bergman	Republican	2016	Incumbent re-elected.	▌ ✓ Jack Bergman (Republican); ▌Callie Barr (Democratic); ▌Arnett Satterla (Libertarian); ▌Liz Hakola (Working Class); ▌Doc Kovaly (U.S. Taxpayers); ▌Zebulon Featherly (Independent); ▌LaVeta Davenport (Green)
Michigan 2	R+15	John Moolenaar	Republican	2014	Incumbent re-elected.	▌ ✓ John Moolenaar (Republican); ▌Ben Ambrose (Democratic); ▌Charlotte Magoon (Green); ▌Richard Sills (Natural Law)
Michigan 3	D+4	Hillary Scholten	Democratic	2022	Incumbent re-elected.	▌ ✓ Hillary Scholten (Democratic); ▌Terri DeBoer (Republican); ▌Joe Jock (Green)
Michigan 4	R+3	Bill Huizenga	Republican	2010	Incumbent lost re-election. Democratic gain.	▌ ✓ Sean McCann (Democratic); ▌Bill Huizenga (Republican); ▌Shafina Che Barnett (Green)
Michigan 5	R+13	Tim Walberg	Republican	2006; 2008 (lost); 2010	Incumbent re-elected.	▌ ✓ Tim Walberg (Republican); ▌Christian Vukasovich (Democratic); ▌Ronald A. Muszynski (Libertarian); ▌Sharon M. Renier (U.S. Taxpayers); ▌Jim Bronke (Green)
Michigan 6	D+12	Debbie Dingell	Democratic	2014	Incumbent re-elected.	▌ ✓ Debbie Dingell (Democratic); ▌Heather Smiley (Republican); ▌Linda Rayburn (Working Class); ▌Timothy A. Tegan (Libertarian); ▌Clyde Shabazz (Green); ▌Michael Mickevicius (U.S. Taxpayers)
Michigan 7	EVEN	Tom Barrett	Republican	2024	Incumbent lost re-election. Democratic gain.	▌ ✓ William Lawrence (Democratic); ▌Tom Barrett (Republican); ▌Shane Dedrick (Green)
Michigan 8	R+1	Kristen McDonald Rivet	Democratic	2024	Incumbent re-elected.	▌ ✓ Kristen McDonald Rivet (Democratic); ▌Thomas Smith (Republican); ▌Kathy Goodwin (Working Class); ▌Mia C. Pettus (Libertarian); ▌Jim Casha (Green)
Michigan 9	R+16	Lisa McClain	Republican	2020	Incumbent re-elected.	▌ ✓ Lisa McClain (Republican); ▌Ray Pooley (Democratic); ▌Jim Walkowicz (Working Class); ▌Kevin Vayko (Libertarian); ▌John Vlahos (U.S. Taxpayers); ▌Destiny Clayton (Green)
Michigan 10	R+3	John James	Republican	2022	Incumbent retired to run for governor. Democratic gain.	▌ ✓ Christina Hines (Democratic); ▌Mike Bouchard Jr. (Republican); ▌Andrea L. Kirby (Working Class); ▌Kwabena Nkromo (Green); ▌Mike Saliba (Libertarian)
Michigan 11	D+9	Haley Stevens	Democratic	2018	Incumbent retired to run for U.S. Senate. Democratic hold.	▌ ✓ Jeremy Moss (Democratic); ▌Ethan Baker (Republican); ▌Anil Kumar (Independent); ▌Farid Ishac (Libertarian); ▌Ryan Teasdale (Green)
Michigan 12	D+21	Rashida Tlaib	Democratic	2018	Incumbent re-elected.	▌ ✓ Rashida Tlaib (Democratic); ▌James Hooper (Republican); ▌Gary Walkowicz (Working Class); ▌Brenda K. Sanders (Green); ▌Marc J. Sosnowski (U.S. Taxpayers)
Michigan 13	D+22	Shri Thanedar	Democratic	2022	Incumbent lost renomination. Democratic hold.	▌ ✓ Donavan McKinney (Democratic); ▌T. P. Nykoriak (Republican); ▌Simone R. Coleman (Working Class); ▌Chris Dardzinski (U.S. Taxpayers); ▌Raelyn Light (Green)

== Minnesota ==
District		Incumbent			This race	
Location	PVI	Member	Party	First elected	Results	Candidates
Minnesota 1	R+6	Brad Finstad	Republican	2022 (special)	Incumbent renominated.	▌Brad Finstad (Republican); ▌Jake Johnson (DFL)
Minnesota 2	D+3	Angie Craig	DFL	2018	Incumbent retiring to run for U.S. Senate. DFL hold.	▌ ✓ Matt Little (DFL) 57.1%; ▌Eric Pratt (Republican) 42.8%
Minnesota 3	D+11	Kelly Morrison	DFL	2024	Incumbent re-elected.	▌ ✓ Kelly Morrison (DFL) 64.0%; ▌Tyler Bass (Republican) 35.8%
Minnesota 4	D+18	Betty McCollum	DFL	2000	Incumbent re-elected.	▌ ✓ Betty McCollum (DFL) 73.1%; ▌Paul Wikstrom (Republican) 26.8%
Minnesota 5	D+32	Ilhan Omar	DFL	2018	Incumbent re-elected.	▌ ✓ Ilhan Omar (DFL) 76.5%; ▌John Nagel (Republican) 16.2%; ▌DeVelle Jackson (Independent) 7.0%
Minnesota 6	R+10	Tom Emmer	Republican	2014	Incumbent re-elected.	▌ ✓ Tom Emmer (Republican) 55.7%; ▌Doug Chapin (DFL) 44.2%
Minnesota 7	R+18	Michelle Fischbach	Republican	2020	Incumbent re-elected.	▌ ✓ Michelle Fischbach (Republican) 64.9%; ▌Erik Osberg (DFL) 35.0%
Minnesota 8	R+7	Pete Stauber	Republican	2018	Incumbent re-elected.	▌ ✓ Pete Stauber (Republican) 53.0%; ▌Trina Swanson (DFL) 46.9%

== Mississippi ==
District		Incumbent			This race	
Location	PVI	Member	Party	First elected	Results	Candidates
Mississippi 1	R+18	Trent Kelly	Republican	2015 (special)	Incumbent re-elected.	▌ ✓ Trent Kelly (Republican); ▌Cliff Johnson (Democratic); ▌Johnny Baucom (Libertarian)
Mississippi 2	D+11	Bennie Thompson	Democratic	1993 (special)	Incumbent re-elected.	▌ ✓ Bennie Thompson (Democratic); ▌Ron Eller (Republican); ▌Bennie Foster (Independent)
Mississippi 3	R+14	Michael Guest	Republican	2018	Incumbent re-elected.	▌ ✓ Michael Guest (Republican); ▌Michael Chiaradio (Democratic); ▌Erik Kiehle (Libertarian)
Mississippi 4	R+21	Mike Ezell	Republican	2022	Incumbent re-elected.	▌ ✓ Mike Ezell (Republican); ▌Jeffrey Hulum III (Democratic); ▌Carl Boyanton (Independent)

== Missouri ==
District		Incumbent			This race	
Location	PVI	Member	Party	First elected	Results	Candidates
Missouri 1	D+29	Wesley Bell	Democratic	2024	Incumbent re-elected.	▌ ✓ Wesley Bell (Democratic); ▌Paul Berry (Republican); ▌Tom Schmitz (Libertarian)
Missouri 2	R+4	Ann Wagner	Republican	2012	Incumbent lost re-election. Democratic gain.	▌ ✓ Fred Wellman (Democratic); ▌Ann Wagner (Republican); ▌Brandon Daugherty (Libertarian)
Missouri 3	R+13	Bob Onder	Republican	2024	Incumbent re-elected.	▌ ✓ Bob Onder (Republican); ▌Bethany Mann (Democratic); ▌Jim Higgins (Libertarian)
Missouri 4	R+21	Mark Alford	Republican	2022	Incumbent re-elected.	▌ ✓ Mark Alford (Republican); ▌Jordan Herrera (Democratic); ▌Thomas Holbrook (Libertarian)
Missouri 5	D+12	Emanuel Cleaver	Democratic	2004	Incumbent re-elected.	▌ ✓ Emanuel Cleaver (Democratic); ▌Rick Brattin (Republican); ▌Randy Langkraehr (Libertarian)
Missouri 6	R+19	Sam Graves	Republican	2000	Incumbent retired. Republican hold.	▌ ✓ Chris Stigall (Republican); ▌Josh Smead (Democratic); ▌Andy Maidment (Libertarian)
Missouri 7	R+21	Eric Burlison	Republican	2022	Incumbent re-elected.	▌ ✓ Eric Burlison (Republican); ▌Missi Hesketh (Democratic); ▌Kevin Craig (Libertarian)
Missouri 8	R+27	Jason Smith	Republican	2013 (special)	Incumbent re-elected.	▌ ✓ Jason Smith (Republican); ▌Chris Reichard (Democratic); ▌Rebecca Sharpe Lombard (Libertarian)

== Montana ==
District		Incumbent			This race	
Location	PVI	Member	Party	First elected	Results	Candidates
Montana 1	R+5	Ryan Zinke	Republican	2014; 2017 (resigned); 2022	Incumbent retired. Democratic gain.	▌ ✓ Sam Forstag (Democratic); ▌Aaron Flint (Republican); ▌Nick Sheedy (Libertarian)
Montana 2	R+15	Troy Downing	Republican	2024	Incumbent re-elected.	▌ ✓ Troy Downing (Republican); ▌Brian Miller (Democratic); ▌Michael Eisenhauer (Independent); ▌Patrick McCracken (Libertarian)

== Nebraska ==
District		Incumbent			This race	
Location	PVI	Member	Party	First elected	Results	Candidates
Nebraska 1	R+6	Mike Flood	Republican	2022 (special)	Incumbent re-elected.	▌ ✓ Mike Flood (Republican); ▌Chris Backemeyer (Democratic); ▌Nik Sandman (Libertarian); ▌Daniel Hartong (America First)
Nebraska 2	D+3	Don Bacon	Republican	2016	Incumbent retired. Democratic gain.	▌ ✓ Denise Powell (Democratic); ▌Brinker Harding (Republican); ▌Eric Foreman (Libertarian)
Nebraska 3	R+27	Adrian Smith	Republican	2006	Incumbent re-elected.	▌ ✓ Adrian Smith (Republican); ▌Becky Stille (Democratic); ▌Mark Cohen (Independent); ▌David Else (Legal Marijuana Now); ▌Macey Budke (Working People)

== Nevada ==
District		Incumbent			This race	
Location	PVI	Member	Party	First elected	Results	Candidates
Nevada 1	D+2	Dina Titus	Democratic	2008; 2010 (lost); 2012	Incumbent re-elected.	▌ ✓ Dina Titus (Democratic); ▌Carrie Buck (Republican); ▌Steven St. John (Independent); ▌Bobby Khan (Independent)
Nevada 2	R+7	Mark Amodei	Republican	2011 (special)	Incumbent retired. Democratic gain.	▌ ✓ Teresa Benitez-Thompson (Democratic); ▌David Flippo (Republican); ▌Lynn Chapman (Independent American)
Nevada 3	D+1	Susie Lee	Democratic	2018	Incumbent re-elected.	▌ ✓ Susie Lee (Democratic); ▌Martin O'Donnell (Republican); ▌Jon Kamerath (Independent American)
Nevada 4	D+2	Steven Horsford	Democratic	2012; 2014 (lost); 2018	Incumbent re-elected.	▌ ✓ Steven Horsford (Democratic); ▌Cody Whipple (Republican); ▌Russell Best (Independent American); ▌William Johnson (Independent)

== New Hampshire ==
District		Incumbent			This race	
Location	PVI	Member	Party	First elected	Results	Candidates
New Hampshire 1	D+2	Chris Pappas	Democratic	2018	Incumbent retired to run for U.S. Senate. Democratic hold.	▌ ✓ Stefany Shaheen (Democratic) 56.9%; ▌Anthony DiLorenzo (Republican) 42.9%
New Hampshire 2	D+2	Maggie Goodlander	Democratic	2024	Incumbent re-elected.	▌ ✓ Maggie Goodlander (Democratic) 58.8%; ▌Lily Tang Williams (Republican) 38.8%; ▌Robbie Mahrou (Independent) 2.4%

== New Jersey ==
District		Incumbent			This race	
Location	PVI	Member	Party	First elected	Results	Candidates
New Jersey 1	D+10	Donald Norcross	Democratic	2014 (special)	Incumbent re-elected.	▌ ✓ Donald Norcross (Democratic); ▌Damon Galdo (Republican)
New Jersey 2	R+5	Jeff Van Drew	Republican	2018	Incumbent lost re-election. Democratic gain.	▌ ✓ Zack Mullock (Democratic); ▌Jeff Van Drew (Republican); ▌Ramon Mora Jr. (Independent)
New Jersey 3	D+5	Herb Conaway	Democratic	2024	Incumbent re-elected.	▌ ✓ Herb Conaway (Democratic); ▌Michael McGuire (Republican); ▌Ryan Kelly (Independent); ▌Steven Welzer (Green)
New Jersey 4	R+14	Chris Smith	Republican	1980	Incumbent re-elected.	▌ ✓ Chris Smith (Republican); ▌Rachel Peace (Democratic)
New Jersey 5	D+2	Josh Gottheimer	Democratic	2016	Incumbent re-elected.	▌ ✓ Josh Gottheimer (Democratic); ▌Sean Kirrane (Republican); ▌Adam Rueda (Independent)
New Jersey 6	D+5	Frank Pallone	Democratic	1988 (special)	Incumbent re-elected.	▌ ✓ Frank Pallone (Democratic); ▌Hillary Herzig (Republican)
New Jersey 7	EVEN	Thomas Kean Jr.	Republican	2022	Incumbent lost re-election. Democratic gain.	▌ ✓ Rebecca Bennett (Democratic); ▌Thomas Kean Jr. (Republican); ▌Seamus O'Toole (Independent)
New Jersey 8	D+15	Rob Menendez	Democratic	2022	Incumbent re-elected.	▌ ✓ Rob Menendez (Democratic); ▌Craig Honts (Socialist Workers); ▌Aristotle Eliopoulos (Independent); ▌Da'Shone Hughey (Independent)
New Jersey 9	D+2	Nellie Pou	Democratic	2024	Incumbent re-elected.	▌ ✓ Nellie Pou (Democratic); ▌Rosie Pino (Republican); ▌Terrisa Bukovinac (Independent)
New Jersey 10	D+27	LaMonica McIver	Democratic	2024 (special)	Incumbent re-elected.	▌ ✓ LaMonica McIver (Democratic); ▌Carmen Bucco (Republican)
New Jersey 11	D+5	Analilia Mejia	Democratic	2026 (special)	Incumbent re-elected.	▌ ✓ Analilia Mejia (Democratic); ▌Joe Hathaway (Republican); ▌Alan Bond (Independent)
New Jersey 12	D+13	Bonnie Watson Coleman	Democratic	2014	Incumbent retired. Democratic hold.	▌ ✓ Adam Hamawy (Democratic); ▌Gregg Mele (Republican); ▌Winston Jordan (Independent); ▌Andres Jinete (Green)

== New Mexico ==
District		Incumbent			This race	
Location	PVI	Member	Party	First elected	Results	Candidates
New Mexico 1	D+7	Melanie Stansbury	Democratic	2021 (special)	Incumbent re-elected.	▌ ✓ Melanie Stansbury (Democratic); ▌Didi Okpareke (Republican)
New Mexico 2	EVEN	Gabe Vasquez	Democratic	2022	Incumbent re-elected.	▌ ✓ Gabe Vasquez (Democratic); ▌Greg Cunningham (Republican)
New Mexico 3	D+3	Teresa Leger Fernández	Democratic	2020	Incumbent re-elected.	▌ ✓ Teresa Leger Fernández (Democratic); ▌Martin Zamora (Republican)

== New York ==
District		Incumbent			This race	
Location	PVI	Member	Party	First elected	Results	Candidates
New York 1	R+4	Nick LaLota	Republican	2022	Incumbent re-elected.	▌▌ ✓ Nick LaLota (Republican/Cons.); ▌▌Chris Gallant (Democratic/WFP)
New York 2	R+6	Andrew Garbarino	Republican	2020	Incumbent re-elected.	▌▌ ✓ Andrew Garbarino (Republican/Cons.); ▌▌Patrick Halpin (Democratic/WFP)
New York 3	EVEN	Tom Suozzi	Democratic	2016; 2022 (retired); 2024 (special)	Incumbent re-elected.	▌ ✓ Tom Suozzi (Democratic); ▌▌Mike LiPetri (Republican/Cons.)
New York 4	D+2	Laura Gillen	Democratic	2024	Incumbent re-elected.	▌ ✓ Laura Gillen (Democratic); ▌▌Jeanine Driscoll (Republican/Cons.); ▌Blay Tarnoff (Libertarian)
New York 5	D+24	Gregory Meeks	Democratic	1998 (special)	Incumbent re-elected.	▌ ✓ Gregory Meeks (Democratic); ▌George Marsh (Republican)
New York 6	D+6	Grace Meng	Democratic	2012	Incumbent re-elected.	▌ ✓ Grace Meng (Democratic); ▌▌Joseph Chou (Republican/Cons.)
New York 7	D+25	Nydia Velázquez	Democratic	1992	Incumbent retired. Democratic hold.	▌▌ ✓ Claire Valdez (Democratic/WFP); ▌▌Melvin Rivera (Republican/Cons.); ▌Priscilla Ghaznavi (Independent)
New York 8	D+24	Hakeem Jeffries	Democratic	2012	Incumbent re-elected.	▌ ✓ Hakeem Jeffries (Democratic); ▌▌Lewis Mizrahi (Republican/Cons.)
New York 9	D+22	Yvette Clarke	Democratic	2006	Incumbent re-elected.	▌ ✓ Yvette Clarke (Democratic); ▌▌Joel Azumah (Republican/Cons.)
New York 10	D+32	Dan Goldman	Democratic	2022	Incumbent lost renomination. Democratic hold.	▌▌ ✓ Brad Lander (Democratic/WFP); ▌▌Jennifer Moore (Republican/Cons.)
New York 11	R+10	Nicole Malliotakis	Republican	2020	Incumbent re-elected.	▌▌ ✓ Nicole Malliotakis (Republican/Cons.); ▌Michael DeCillis (Democratic)
New York 12	D+33	Jerry Nadler	Democratic	1992 (special)	Incumbent retired. Democratic hold.	▌ ✓ Micah Lasher (Democratic); ▌▌Caroline Shinkle (Republican/Cons.); ▌Karen Ortiz (Independent); ▌Wilneida Negron (Independent)
New York 13	D+32	Adriano Espaillat	Democratic	2016	Incumbent lost renomination. Democratic hold.	▌▌ ✓ Darializa Avila Chevalier (Democratic/WFP); ▌▌Jomo Williams (Republican/Cons.)
New York 14	D+19	Alexandria Ocasio-Cortez	Democratic	2018	Incumbent re-elected.	▌▌ ✓ Alexandria Ocasio-Cortez (Democratic/WFP); ▌▌Diamant Hysenaj (Republican/Cons.)
New York 15	D+27	Ritchie Torres	Democratic	2020	Incumbent re-elected.	▌ ✓ Ritchie Torres (Democratic); ▌Stylo Sapaskis (Republican); ▌Andre Easton (PSL) (Note: Easton appeared on the ballot as an Independent); ▌Jose Vega (Independent) (Note: Vega appeared on the ballot as an Independent, but represents the Speak the Truth Party); ▌Gonzalo Duran (Conservative)
New York 16	D+18	George Latimer	Democratic	2024	Incumbent re-elected.	▌ ✓ George Latimer (Democratic); ▌Joseph Cinquemani (Republican)
New York 17	D+1	Mike Lawler	Republican	2022	Incumbent lost re-election. Democratic gain.	▌▌ ✓ Cait Conley (Democratic/WFP); ▌▌Mike Lawler (Republican/Cons.)
New York 18	D+2	Pat Ryan	Democratic	2022 (special)	Incumbent re-elected.	▌▌ ✓ Pat Ryan (Democratic/WFP); ▌▌Jacqueline Auringer (Republican/Cons.)
New York 19	D+1	Josh Riley	Democratic	2024	Incumbent re-elected.	▌▌ ✓ Josh Riley (Democratic/WFP); ▌▌Peter Oberacker (Republican/Cons.)
New York 20	D+8	Paul Tonko	Democratic	2008	Incumbent re-elected.	▌▌ ✓ Paul Tonko (Democratic/WFP); ▌▌Ralph Ambrosio (Republican/Cons.)
New York 21	R+10	Elise Stefanik	Republican	2014	Incumbent retired. Republican hold.	▌ ✓ Anthony Constantino (Republican); ▌Blake Gendebien (Democratic)
New York 22	D+4	John Mannion	Democratic	2024	Incumbent re-elected.	▌▌ ✓ John Mannion (Democratic/WFP); ▌▌Kailee Buller (Republican/Cons.)
New York 23	R+10	Nick Langworthy	Republican	2022	Incumbent re-elected.	▌▌ ✓ Nick Langworthy (Republican/Cons.); ▌▌Aaron Gies (Democratic/WFP)
New York 24	R+11	Claudia Tenney	Republican	2016; 2018 (lost); 2020	Incumbent re-elected.	▌▌ ✓ Claudia Tenney (Republican/Cons.); ▌▌Alissa Ellman (Democratic/WFP)
New York 25	D+10	Joseph Morelle	Democratic	2018 (special)	Incumbent re-elected.	▌▌ ✓ Joseph Morelle (Democratic/WFP); ▌▌Virginia McIntyre (Republican/Cons.)
New York 26	D+11	Tim Kennedy	Democratic	2024 (special)	Incumbent re-elected.	▌ ✓ Tim Kennedy (Democratic); ▌▌Dennis Hannon (Republican/Cons.)

== North Carolina ==
District		Incumbent			This race	
Location	PVI	Member	Party	First elected	Results	Candidates
North Carolina 1	R+5	Don Davis	Democratic	2022	Incumbent re-elected.	▌ ✓ Don Davis (Democratic); ▌Laurie Buckhout (Republican); ▌Tom Bailey (Libertarian)
North Carolina 2	D+17	Deborah Ross	Democratic	2020	Incumbent re-elected.	▌ ✓ Deborah Ross (Democratic); ▌Eugene Douglass (Republican); ▌Matthew Laszacs (Libertarian)
North Carolina 3	R+6	Greg Murphy	Republican	2019 (special)	Incumbent lost re-election. Democratic gain.	▌ ✓ Raymond Smith Jr. (Democratic); ▌Greg Murphy (Republican); ▌Daniel Cavender (Libertarian)
North Carolina 4	D+23	Valerie Foushee	Democratic	2022	Incumbent re-elected.	▌ ✓ Valerie Foushee (Democratic); ▌Max Ganorkar (Republican); ▌Guy Meilleur (Libertarian)
North Carolina 5	R+9	Virginia Foxx	Republican	2004	Incumbent lost re-election. Democratic gain.	▌ ✓ Chuck Hubbard (Democratic); ▌Virginia Foxx (Republican); ▌Robert Luffman (Libertarian)
North Carolina 6	R+9	Addison McDowell	Republican	2024	Incumbent lost re-election. Democratic gain.	▌ ✓ Cyril Jefferson (Democratic); ▌Addison McDowell (Republican)
North Carolina 7	R+7	David Rouzer	Republican	2014	Incumbent re-elected.	▌ ✓ David Rouzer (Republican); ▌Kimberly Hardy (Democratic); ▌Maad Abu-Ghazalah (Libertarian)
North Carolina 8	R+10	Mark Harris	Republican	2024	Incumbent re-elected.	▌ ✓ Mark Harris (Republican); ▌Colby Watson (Democratic); ▌Bo Whitehead (Green)
North Carolina 9	R+8	Richard Hudson	Republican	2012	Incumbent lost re-election. Democratic gain.	▌ ✓ Richard Ojeda (Democratic); ▌Richard Hudson (Republican)
North Carolina 10	R+9	Pat Harrigan	Republican	2024	Incumbent re-elected.	▌ ✓ Pat Harrigan (Republican); ▌Ashley Bell (Democratic); ▌Steve Feldman (Libertarian)
North Carolina 11	R+5	Chuck Edwards	Republican	2022	Incumbent renominated but withdrew. Democratic gain.	▌ ✓ Jamie Ager (Democratic); ▌Jennifer Balkcom (Republican); ▌Travis Groo (Libertarian)
North Carolina 12	D+24	Alma Adams	Democratic	2014 (special)	Incumbent re-elected.	▌ ✓ Alma Adams (Democratic); ▌Jack Codiga (Republican)
North Carolina 13	R+8	Brad Knott	Republican	2024	Incumbent lost re-election. Democratic gain.	▌ ✓ Paul Barringer (Democratic); ▌Brad Knott (Republican); ▌Steven Swinton (Libertarian)
North Carolina 14	R+8	Tim Moore	Republican	2024	Incumbent lost re-election. Democratic gain.	▌ ✓ LaKesha Womack (Democratic); ▌Tim Moore (Republican)

== North Dakota ==
District		Incumbent			This race	
Location	PVI	Member	Party	First elected	Results	Candidates
North Dakota at-large	R+18	Julie Fedorchak	Republican	2024	Incumbent re-elected.	▌ ✓ Julie Fedorchak (Republican) 57.3%; ▌Trygve Hammer (Democratic-NPL) 36.6%; ▌Charles Tuttle (Independent) 4.0%; ▌Helene Neville (Independent) 2.0%

== Ohio ==
District		Incumbent			This race	
Location	PVI	Member	Party	First elected	Results	Candidates (Note: In Ohio, congressional candidates file with the board of elections of the most populous county in their districts, not with the Secretary of State.)
Ohio 1	R+1	Greg Landsman	Democratic	2022	Incumbent re-elected.	▌ ✓ Greg Landsman (Democratic); ▌Eric Conroy (Republican); ▌Nathan Weise (Libertarian)
Ohio 2	R+21	David Taylor	Republican	2024	Incumbent re-elected.	▌ ✓ David Taylor (Republican); ▌Jennifer Mazzuckelli (Democratic)
Ohio 3	D+21	Joyce Beatty	Democratic	2012	Incumbent re-elected.	▌ ✓ Joyce Beatty (Democratic); ▌Cleophus Dulaney (Republican)
Ohio 4	R+21	Jim Jordan	Republican	2006	Incumbent re-elected.	▌ ✓ Jim Jordan (Republican); ▌Joshua Kolasinski (Democratic); ▌Tracey Tackett (Independent)
Ohio 5	R+12	Bob Latta	Republican	2007 (special)	Incumbent re-elected.	▌ ✓ Bob Latta (Republican); ▌Brian Shaver (Democratic); ▌Michael Veloff (Libertarian)
Ohio 6	R+17	Michael Rulli	Republican	2024 (special)	Incumbent re-elected.	▌ ✓ Michael Rulli (Republican); ▌Elizabeth Kirtley (Democratic)
Ohio 7	R+5	Max Miller	Republican	2022	Incumbent lost re-election. Democratic gain.	▌ ✓ Brian Poindexter (Democratic); ▌Max Miller (Republican)
Ohio 8	R+8	Warren Davidson	Republican	2016 (special)	Incumbent re-elected.	▌ ✓ Warren Davidson (Republican); ▌Vanessa Enoch (Democratic)
Ohio 9	R+5	Marcy Kaptur	Democratic	1982	Incumbent re-elected.	▌ ✓ Marcy Kaptur (Democratic); ▌Derek Merrin (Republican); ▌Matthew Althaus (Libertarian)
Ohio 10	R+4	Mike Turner	Republican	2002	Incumbent lost re-election. Democratic gain.	▌ ✓ Kristina Knickerbocker (Democratic); ▌Thomas McMasters (Libertarian); ▌Mike Turner (Republican)
Ohio 11	D+28	Shontel Brown	Democratic	2021 (special)	Incumbent re-elected.	▌ ✓ Shontel Brown (Democratic); ▌Mike Kirchner (Republican)
Ohio 12	R+15	Troy Balderson	Republican	2018 (special)	Incumbent re-elected.	▌ ✓ Troy Balderson (Republican); ▌Jerrad Christian (Democratic)
Ohio 13	D+2	Emilia Sykes	Democratic	2022	Incumbent re-elected.	▌ ✓ Emilia Sykes (Democratic); ▌Carey Coleman (Republican); ▌Sandeep Dixit (Independent)
Ohio 14	R+10	David Joyce	Republican	2022	Incumbent re-elected.	▌ ✓ David Joyce (Republican); ▌Maria Jukic (Democratic)
Ohio 15	R+5	Mike Carey	Republican	2021 (special)	Incumbent lost re-election. Democratic gain.	▌ ✓ Don Leonard (Democratic); ▌Mike Carey (Republican); ▌Brennan Barrington (Libertarian)

== Oklahoma ==
District		Incumbent			This race	
Location	PVI	Member	Party	First elected	Results	Candidates
Oklahoma 1	R+11	Kevin Hern	Republican	2018	Incumbent retired to run for U.S. Senate. Republican hold.	▌ ✓ Mark Tedford (Republican) 52.3%; ▌John Croisant (Democratic) 47.7%
Oklahoma 2	R+28	Josh Brecheen	Republican	2022	Incumbent re-elected.	▌ ✓ Josh Brecheen (Republican) 68.0%; ▌Brandon Wade (Democratic) 29.0%; ▌Ronnie Hopkins (Independent) 3.1%
Oklahoma 3	R+23	Frank Lucas	Republican	1994 (special)	Incumbent re-elected.	▌ ✓ Frank Lucas (Republican) 64.0%; ▌Suzie Byrd (Democratic) 36.0%
Oklahoma 4	R+17	Tom Cole	Republican	2002	Incumbent re-elected.	▌ ✓ Tom Cole (Republican) 57.6%; ▌Mitchell Jacob (Democratic) 39.5%; ▌Rocco Bonacci (Independent) 2.9%
Oklahoma 5	R+9	Stephanie Bice	Republican	2020	Incumbent re-elected.	▌ ✓ Stephanie Bice (Republican) 49.5%; ▌Jena Nelson (Democratic) 48.2%; ▌Robert Henri (Independent) 1.5%; ▌Austin Nieves (Independent) 0.8%

== Oregon ==
District		Incumbent			This race	
Location	PVI	Member	Party	First elected	Results	Candidates
Oregon 1	D+20	Suzanne Bonamici	Democratic	2012 (special)	Incumbent re-elected.	▌ ✓ Suzanne Bonamici (Democratic); ▌Barbara Kahl (Republican)
Oregon 2	R+14	Cliff Bentz	Republican	2020	Incumbent re-elected.	▌ ✓ Cliff Bentz (Republican); ▌Chris Beck (Democratic)
Oregon 3	D+24	Maxine Dexter	Democratic	2024	Incumbent re-elected.	▌ ✓ Maxine Dexter (Democratic); ▌Loran Ayles (Republican)
Oregon 4	D+6	Val Hoyle	Democratic	2022	Incumbent re-elected.	▌ ✓ Val Hoyle (Democratic); ▌Monique DeSpain (Republican); ▌Justin Filip (Pacific Green)
Oregon 5	D+4	Janelle Bynum	Democratic	2024	Incumbent re-elected.	▌ ✓ Janelle Bynum (Democratic); ▌Patti Adair (Republican); ▌Andrea Townsend (Pacific Green)
Oregon 6	D+6	Andrea Salinas	Democratic	2022	Incumbent re-elected.	▌ ✓ Andrea Salinas (Democratic); ▌David Russ (Republican)

== Pennsylvania ==
District		Incumbent			This race	
Location	PVI	Member	Party	First elected	Results	Candidates
Pennsylvania 1	D+1	Brian Fitzpatrick	Republican	2016	Incumbent lost re-election. Democratic gain.	▌ ✓ Bob Harvie (Democratic); ▌Brian Fitzpatrick (Republican)
Pennsylvania 2	D+19	Brendan Boyle	Democratic	2014	Incumbent re-elected.	▌ ✓ Brendan Boyle (Democratic); ▌Jessica Arriaga (Republican)
Pennsylvania 3	D+40	Dwight Evans	Democratic	2016 (special)	Incumbent retired. Democratic hold.	▌ ✓ Chris Rabb (Democratic); ▌Dennis Mahoney (Independent)
Pennsylvania 4	D+8	Madeleine Dean	Democratic	2018	Incumbent re-elected.	▌ ✓ Madeleine Dean (Democratic); ▌Aurora Stuski (Republican)
Pennsylvania 5	D+15	Mary Gay Scanlon	Democratic	2018 (special)	Incumbent re-elected.	▌ ✓ Mary Gay Scanlon (Democratic); ▌Nicholas Manganaro (Republican)
Pennsylvania 6	D+6	Chrissy Houlahan	Democratic	2018	Incumbent re-elected.	▌ ✓ Chrissy Houlahan (Democratic); ▌Marty Young (Republican)
Pennsylvania 7	R+1	Ryan Mackenzie	Republican	2024	Incumbent lost re-election. Democratic gain.	▌ ✓ Bob Brooks (Democratic); ▌Ryan Mackenzie (Republican)
Pennsylvania 8	R+4	Rob Bresnahan	Republican	2024	Incumbent lost re-election. Democratic gain.	▌ ✓ Paige Cognetti (Democratic); ▌Rob Bresnahan (Republican)
Pennsylvania 9	R+19	Dan Meuser	Republican	2018	Incumbent re-elected.	▌ ✓ Dan Meuser (Republican); ▌Rachel Wallace (Democratic)
Pennsylvania 10	R+3	Scott Perry	Republican	2012	Incumbent lost re-election. Democratic gain.	▌ ✓ Janelle Stelson (Democratic); ▌Scott Perry (Republican)
Pennsylvania 11	R+11	Lloyd Smucker	Republican	2016	Incumbent re-elected.	▌ ✓ Lloyd Smucker (Republican); ▌Nancy Mannion (Democratic)
Pennsylvania 12	D+10	Summer Lee	Democratic	2022	Incumbent re-elected.	▌ ✓ Summer Lee (Democratic); ▌James Hayes (Republican)
Pennsylvania 13	R+23	John Joyce	Republican	2018	Incumbent re-elected.	▌ ✓ John Joyce (Republican); ▌Beth Farnham (Democratic)
Pennsylvania 14	R+17	Guy Reschenthaler	Republican	2018	Incumbent re-elected.	▌ ✓ Guy Reschenthaler (Republican); ▌Alan Bradstock (Democratic)
Pennsylvania 15	R+19	Glenn Thompson	Republican	2008	Incumbent re-elected.	▌ ✓ Glenn Thompson (Republican); ▌Ray Bilger (Democratic)
Pennsylvania 16	R+11	Mike Kelly	Republican	2010	Incumbent re-elected.	▌ ✓ Mike Kelly (Republican); ▌Justin Wagner (Democratic)
Pennsylvania 17	D+3	Chris Deluzio	Democratic	2022	Incumbent re-elected.	▌ ✓ Chris Deluzio (Democratic); ▌Tony Guy (Republican)

== Rhode Island ==
District		Incumbent			This race	
Location	PVI	Member	Party	First elected	Results	Candidates
Rhode Island 1	D+12	Gabe Amo	Democratic	2023 (special)	Incumbent re-elected.	▌ ✓ Gabe Amo (Democratic); ▌Kellie Keenan (Republican); ▌Pedro DeSouza (Independent)
Rhode Island 2	D+4	Seth Magaziner	Democratic	2022	Incumbent re-elected.	▌ ✓ Seth Magaziner (Democratic); ▌Vic Mellor (Republican)

== South Carolina ==
District		Incumbent			This race	
Location	PVI	Member	Party	First elected	Results	Candidates
South Carolina 1	R+6	Nancy Mace	Republican	2020	Incumbent retired to run for governor. Democratic gain.	▌ ✓ Nancy Lacore (Democratic) 49.7%; ▌Jenny Costa Honeycutt (Republican) 48.6%; ▌Bill Reeside (Libertarian) 1.6%
South Carolina 2	R+7	Joe Wilson	Republican	2001 (special)	Incumbent re-elected.	▌ ✓ Joe Wilson (Republican) 49.8%; ▌Zyon Khalifa (Democratic) 48.8%; ▌Dayna Alane Smith (Workers) 1.2%
South Carolina 3	R+21	Sheri Biggs	Republican	2024	Incumbent re-elected.	▌ ✓ Sheri Biggs (Republican) 63.7%; ▌Eunice Lehmacher (Democratic) 34.4%; ▌Brian Corriea (Libertarian) 1.9%
South Carolina 4	R+11	William Timmons	Republican	2018	Incumbent re-elected.	▌ ✓ William Timmons (Republican) 51.7%; ▌Courtney McClain (Democratic) 45.7%; ▌Jessica Ethridge (Libertarian) 2.5%
South Carolina 5	R+11	Ralph Norman	Republican	2017 (special)	Incumbent retired to run for governor. Republican hold.	▌ ✓ Wes Climer (Republican) 52.8%; ▌Mallory Dittmer (Democratic) 47.1%
South Carolina 6	D+13	Jim Clyburn	Democratic	1992	Incumbent re-elected.	▌ ✓ Jim Clyburn (Democratic) 69.3%; ▌John Peterson (Republican) 30.6%
South Carolina 7	R+12	Russell Fry	Republican	2022	Incumbent re-elected.	▌ ✓ Russell Fry (Republican) 56.7%; ▌John Vincent (Democratic) 43.2%

== South Dakota ==
District		Incumbent			This race	
Location	PVI	Member	Party	First elected	Results	Candidates
South Dakota at-large	R+15	Dusty Johnson	Republican	2018	Incumbent retired to run for governor. Republican hold.	▌ ✓ Marty Jackley (Republican) 64.0%; ▌Nikki Gronli (Democratic) 36.0%

== Tennessee ==
District		Incumbent			This race	
Location	PVI	Member	Party	First elected	Results	Candidates
Tennessee 1	R+29	Diana Harshbarger	Republican	2020	Incumbent re-elected.	▌ ✓ Diana Harshbarger (Republican); ▌Kristi Burke (Democratic); ▌Joshua Ashburn (Independent); ▌Billy Cody (Independent); ▌Chris Campbell (Independent); ▌Richard Baker (Independent); ▌Tyler McClain (Independent)
Tennessee 2	R+17	Tim Burchett	Republican	2018	Incumbent re-elected.	▌ ✓ Tim Burchett (Republican); ▌Michaela Barnett (Democratic); ▌Bruce Fine (Independent); ▌Adam Heimerman (Independent)
Tennessee 3	R+18	Chuck Fleischmann	Republican	2010	Incumbent re-elected.	▌ ✓ Chuck Fleischmann (Republican); ▌Anna Golladay (Democratic); ▌Dean Arnold (Independent); ▌Rodney Joe King (Independent); ▌Jean Howard-Hill (Independent); ▌Donnie Ownby (Independent); ▌Edward Roland (Independent)
Tennessee 4	R+11	Scott DesJarlais	Republican	2010	Incumbent lost re-election. Democratic gain.	▌ ✓ Victoria Broderick (Democratic); ▌Scott DesJarlais (Republican); ▌Jacob Anders (Independent); ▌Clay Faircloth (Independent)
Tennessee 5	R+10	Andy Ogles	Republican	2022	Incumbent lost renomination. Republican hold.	▌ ✓ Charlie Hatcher (Republican); ▌Chaz Molder (Democratic); ▌James Johnson (Independent); ▌Micheál O'Leary (Independent)
Tennessee 6	R+13	John Rose	Republican	2018	Incumbent retired to run for governor. Republican hold.	▌ ✓ Johnny Garrett (Republican); ▌Mike Croley (Democratic); ▌Christopher Monday (Independent); ▌Angus Purdy (Independent)
Tennessee 7	R+11	Matt Van Epps	Republican	2025 (special)	Incumbent re-elected.	▌ ✓ Matt Van Epps (Republican); ▌Darden Copeland (Democratic); ▌Andrew Koontz (Independent); ▌Lowell Reynolds (Independent)
Tennessee 8	R+10	David Kustoff	Republican	2016	Incumbent re-elected.	▌ ✓ David Kustoff (Republican); ▌Heidi Kuhn (Democratic); ▌Pamela Moses (Independent); ▌Horace Taylor (Independent); ▌Adam Austill (Independent); ▌Wells Blankenship (Independent); ▌Antonio Futch (Independent); ▌Henry Ward III (Independent)
Tennessee 9	R+9	Steve Cohen	Democratic	2006	Incumbent retired. Republican gain.	▌ ✓ Brent Taylor (Republican); ▌Justin Pearson (Democratic); ▌Dennis Clark (Independent); ▌Michelle Head (Independent)

== Texas ==
District		Incumbent			This race	
Location	PVI	Member	Party	First elected	Results	Candidates
Texas 1	R+24	Nathaniel Moran	Republican	2022	Incumbent re-elected.	▌ ✓ Nathaniel Moran (Republican); ▌Yolanda Prince (Democratic)
Texas 2	R+11	Dan Crenshaw	Republican	2018	Incumbent lost renomination. Republican hold.	▌ ✓ Steve Toth (Republican); ▌Shaun Finnie (Democratic)
Texas 3	R+11	Keith Self	Republican	2022	Incumbent re-elected.	▌ ✓ Keith Self (Republican); ▌Evan Hunt (Democratic)
Texas 4	R+12	Pat Fallon	Republican	2020	Incumbent re-elected.	▌ ✓ Pat Fallon (Republican); ▌Jason Pearce (Democratic)
Texas 5	R+10	Lance Gooden	Republican	2018	Incumbent re-elected.	▌ ✓ Lance Gooden (Republican); ▌Chelsey Hockett (Democratic)
Texas 6	R+11	Jake Ellzey	Republican	2021 (special)	Incumbent re-elected.	▌ ✓ Jake Ellzey (Republican); ▌Danny Minton (Democratic)
Texas 7	D+13	Lizzie Fletcher	Democratic	2018	Incumbent re-elected.	▌ ✓ Lizzie Fletcher (Democratic); ▌Alexander Hale (Republican); ▌Espoir Ngabo (Green)
Texas 8	R+13	Morgan Luttrell	Republican	2022	Incumbent retired. Republican hold.	▌ ✓ Jessica Steinmann (Republican); ▌Laura Jones (Democratic)
Texas 9	R+9	None (new seat)			New member elected. Democratic gain.	▌ ✓ Leticia Gutierrez (Democratic); ▌ Alex Mealer (Republican)
Texas 10	R+10	Michael McCaul	Republican	2004	Incumbent retired. Republican hold.	▌ ✓ Chris Gober (Republican); ▌Caitlin Rourk (Democratic)
Texas 11	R+17	August Pfluger	Republican	2020	Incumbent re-elected.	▌ ✓ August Pfluger (Republican); ▌Claire Reynolds (Democratic)
Texas 12	R+11	Craig Goldman	Republican	2024	Incumbent re-elected.	▌ ✓ Craig Goldman (Republican); ▌Angela Rodriguez Prilliman (Democratic)
Texas 13	R+23	Ronny Jackson	Republican	2020	Incumbent re-elected.	▌ ✓ Ronny Jackson (Republican); ▌Mark Nair (Democratic)
Texas 14	R+12	Randy Weber	Republican	2012	Incumbent re-elected.	▌ ✓ Randy Weber (Republican); ▌Thurman Bartie (Democratic)
Texas 15	R+7	Monica De La Cruz	Republican	2022	Incumbent lost re-election. Democratic gain.	▌ ✓ Bobby Pulido (Democratic); ▌Monica De La Cruz (Republican)
Texas 16	D+11	Veronica Escobar	Democratic	2018	Incumbent re-elected.	▌ ✓ Veronica Escobar (Democratic); ▌Adam Bauman (Republican)
Texas 17	R+10	Pete Sessions	Republican	1996; 2018 (lost); 2020	Incumbent re-elected.	▌ ✓ Pete Sessions (Republican); ▌Casey Shepard (Democratic)
Texas 18	D+29	Christian Menefee	Democratic	2026 (special)	Incumbent re-elected.	▌ ✓ Christian Menefee (Democratic); ▌Ronald Whitfield (Republican)
Texas 18	D+29	Al Green; Redistricted from the 9th district	Democratic	2004	Incumbent lost renomination. Democratic loss.	▌ ✓ Christian Menefee (Democratic); ▌Ronald Whitfield (Republican)
Texas 19	R+25	Jodey Arrington	Republican	2016	Incumbent retired. Republican hold.	▌ ✓ Tom Sell (Republican); ▌Kyle Rable (Democratic)
Texas 20	D+16	Joaquin Castro	Democratic	2012	Incumbent re-elected.	▌ ✓ Joaquin Castro (Democratic); ▌Edgardo Rafael Baez (Republican)
Texas 21	R+10	Chip Roy	Republican	2018	Incumbent retired to run for Texas attorney general. Republican hold.	▌ ✓ Mark Teixeira (Republican); ▌Kristin Hook (Democratic)
Texas 22	R+11	Troy Nehls	Republican	2020	Incumbent retired. Republican hold.	▌ ✓ Trever Nehls (Republican); ▌Marquette Greene-Scott (Democratic)
Texas 23	R+7	Vacant			Rep. Tony Gonzales (R) resigned April 14, 2026. Democratic gain.	▌ ✓ Katy Padilla Stout (Democratic); ▌Brandon Herrera (Republican); ▌Ben Mendoza (Independent)
Texas 24	R+8	Beth Van Duyne	Republican	2020	Incumbent re-elected.	▌ ✓ Beth Van Duyne (Republican); ▌Kevin Burge (Democratic)
Texas 25	R+11	Roger Williams	Republican	2012	Incumbent re-elected.	▌ ✓ Roger Williams (Republican); ▌Dione Sims (Democratic)
Texas 25	R+11	Marc Veasey; Redistricted from the 33rd district	Democratic	2012	Incumbent retired. Democratic loss.	▌ ✓ Roger Williams (Republican); ▌Dione Sims (Democratic)
Texas 26	R+11	Brandon Gill	Republican	2024	Incumbent re-elected.	▌ ✓ Brandon Gill (Republican); ▌Steven Shook (Democratic); ▌Phil Gray (Libertarian)
Texas 27	R+10	Michael Cloud	Republican	2018 (special)	Incumbent re-elected.	▌ ✓ Michael Cloud (Republican); ▌Tanya Lloyd (Democratic)
Texas 28	R+3	Henry Cuellar	Democratic	2004	Incumbent re-elected.	▌ ✓ Henry Cuellar (Democratic); ▌Tano Tijerina (Republican); ▌Marlón Durán (Green)
Texas 29	D+17	Sylvia Garcia	Democratic	2018	Incumbent re-elected.	▌ ✓ Sylvia Garcia (Democratic); ▌Martha Fierro (Republican)
Texas 30	D+25	Jasmine Crockett	Democratic	2022	Incumbent retired to run for U.S. Senate. Democratic hold.	▌ ✓ Frederick Haynes III (Democratic); ▌Everett Jackson (Republican)
Texas 31	R+11	John Carter	Republican	2002	Incumbent re-elected.	▌ ✓ John Carter (Republican); ▌Justin Early (Democratic); ▌Greg Stoker (Green)
Texas 32	R+8	None (new seat)			New member elected. Republican gain.	▌ ✓ Jace Yarbrough (Republican); ▌Dan Barrios (Democratic)
Texas 33	D+18	Julie Johnson; Redistricted from the 32nd district	Democratic	2024	Incumbent lost renomination. Democratic hold.	▌ ✓ Colin Allred (Democratic); ▌Patrick Gillespie (Republican)
Texas 34	R+3	Vicente Gonzalez	Democratic	2016	Incumbent re-elected.	▌ ✓ Vicente Gonzalez (Democratic); ▌Eric Flores (Republican); ▌Eddie Espinoza (Green); ▌Chris Royal (Libertarian)
Texas 35	R+4	None (new seat)			New member elected. Democratic gain.	▌ ✓ Johnny Garcia (Democratic); ▌Carlos De La Cruz (Republican)
Texas 36	R+12	Brian Babin	Republican	2014	Incumbent re-elected.	▌ ✓ Brian Babin (Republican); ▌Rhonda Hart (Democratic)
Texas 37	D+30	Lloyd Doggett	Democratic	1994	Incumbent retired. Democratic loss.	▌ ✓ Greg Casar (Democratic); ▌Lauren Peña (Republican)
Texas 37	D+30	Greg Casar; Redistricted from the 35th district	Democratic	2022	Incumbent re-elected.	▌ ✓ Greg Casar (Democratic); ▌Lauren Peña (Republican)
Texas 38	R+10	Wesley Hunt	Republican	2022	Incumbent retired to run for U.S. Senate. Republican hold.	▌ ✓ Jon Bonck (Republican); ▌Melissa McDonough (Democratic); ▌Alex McMenemy (Green)

== Utah ==
District		Incumbent			This race	
Location	PVI	Member	Party	First elected	Results	Candidates
Utah 1	D+12	None (new seat)			New member elected. Democratic gain.	▌ ✓ Ben McAdams (Democratic); ▌Riley Owen (Republican); ▌Jesse West (Libertarian); ▌Elias Montgomery (Independent)
Utah 2	R+15	Blake Moore; Redistricted from the 1st district	Republican	2020	Incumbent re-elected.	▌ ✓ Blake Moore (Republican); ▌Peter Crosby (Democratic); ▌Carlton Bowen (Independent American); ▌Robert Moesinger (Independent); ▌Daniel Cottam (Libertarian)
Utah 3	R+21	Celeste Maloy; Redistricted from the 2nd district	Republican	2023 (special)	Incumbent re-elected.	▌ ✓ Celeste Maloy (Republican); ▌Kent Udell (Democratic); ▌Cassie Easley (Constitution); ▌Michael Stoddard (Libertarian); ▌Ayden Scott (Independent); ▌Adonis Hooslyn (Independent)
Utah 4	R+17	Burgess Owens	Republican	2020	Incumbent retired. Republican loss.	▌ ✓ Mike Kennedy (Republican); ▌Jonny Larsen (Democratic); ▌Steven Burt (Independent); ▌Taylor Wright (Libertarian)
Utah 4	R+17	Mike Kennedy; Redistricted from the 3rd district	Republican	2024	Incumbent re-elected.	▌ ✓ Mike Kennedy (Republican); ▌Jonny Larsen (Democratic); ▌Steven Burt (Independent); ▌Taylor Wright (Libertarian)

== Vermont ==
District		Incumbent			This race	
Location	PVI	Member	Party	First elected	Results	Candidates
Vermont at-large	D+17	Becca Balint	Democratic	2022	Incumbent re-elected.	▌ ✓ Becca Balint (Democratic) 65.2%; ▌Gerald Malloy (Republican) 30.9%; Others: ▌Suz Seymour (Independent) 1.4%; ▌Ryan Walton (Independent) 0.9%; ▌Phoenix Altair (Independent) 0.8%; ▌Adam Ortiz (Independent) 0.7%

== Virginia ==
District		Incumbent			This race	
Location	PVI	Member	Party	First elected	Results	Candidates
Virginia 1	R+3	Rob Wittman	Republican	2007 (special)	Incumbent lost re-election. Democratic gain.	▌ ✓ Shannon Taylor (Democratic); ▌Rob Wittman (Republican)
Virginia 2	EVEN	Jen Kiggans	Republican	2022	Incumbent lost re-election. Democratic gain.	▌ ✓ Elaine Luria (Democratic); ▌Jen Kiggans (Republican); ▌J. Matt Baker (Independent); ▌Geral Staten (Independent)
Virginia 3	D+18	Bobby Scott	Democratic	1992	Incumbent re-elected.	▌ ✓ Bobby Scott (Democratic); ▌Edwin Rivera (Republican); ▌Makiba Gaines (Independent); ▌Stephen Woll (Independent)
Virginia 4	D+17	Jennifer McClellan	Democratic	2023 (special)	Incumbent re-elected.	▌ ✓ Jennifer McClellan (Democratic); ▌Robert Murray (Republican); ▌Joan Bell (Independent)
Virginia 5	R+6	John McGuire	Republican	2024	Incumbent re-elected.	▌ ✓ John McGuire (Republican); ▌Tom Perriello (Democratic); ▌Cooke Harvey (Independent)
Virginia 6	R+12	Ben Cline	Republican	2018	Incumbent re-elected.	▌ ✓ Ben Cline (Republican); ▌Beth Macy (Democratic)
Virginia 7	D+2	Eugene Vindman	Democratic	2024	Incumbent re-elected.	▌ ✓ Eugene Vindman (Democratic); ▌Doug Ollivant (Republican); ▌Alaha Ahrar (Independent); ▌Taner Demirci Lopez (Libertarian); ▌Randall Terry (Independent); ▌Joshua Ertle (Independent)
Virginia 8	D+26	Don Beyer	Democratic	2014	Incumbent re-elected.	▌ ✓ Don Beyer (Democratic); ▌Tony Sabio (Republican); ▌Tim Sharman (Independent); ▌Shelly Arnoldi (Libertarian)
Virginia 9	R+22	Morgan Griffith	Republican	2010	Incumbent re-elected.	▌ ✓ Morgan Griffith (Republican); ▌Joy Powers (Democratic)
Virginia 10	D+6	Suhas Subramanyam	Democratic	2024	Incumbent re-elected.	▌ ✓ Suhas Subramanyam (Democratic); ▌Dave Beckwith (Republican); ▌Ahsen Malik (Independent)
Virginia 11	D+18	James Walkinshaw	Democratic	2025 (special)	Incumbent re-elected.	▌ ✓ James Walkinshaw (Democratic); ▌Arthur Purves (Republican); ▌Dianne Blais (Green)

== Washington ==
District		Incumbent			This race	
Location	PVI	Member	Party	First elected	Results	Candidates
Washington 1	D+15	Suzan DelBene	Democratic	2012 (special)	Incumbent re-elected.	▌ ✓ Suzan DelBene (Democratic); ▌Mary Silva (Republican)
Washington 2	D+12	Rick Larsen	Democratic	2000	Incumbent re-elected.	▌ ✓ Rick Larsen (Democratic); ▌Edwin Feller (Republican)
Washington 3	R+2	Marie Gluesenkamp Perez	Democratic	2022	Incumbent re-elected.	▌ ✓ Marie Gluesenkamp Perez (Democratic); ▌John Braun (Republican)
Washington 4	R+10	Dan Newhouse	Republican	2014	Incumbent retired. Republican hold.	▌ ✓ Amanda McKinney (Republican); ▌John Duresky (Democratic)
Washington 5	R+5	Michael Baumgartner	Republican	2024	Incumbent re-elected.	▌ ✓ Michael Baumgartner (Republican); ▌Carmela Conroy (Democratic)
Washington 6	D+10	Emily Randall	Democratic	2024	Incumbent re-elected.	▌ ✓ Emily Randall (Democratic); ▌Teresa Fox (Republican)
Washington 7	D+39	Pramila Jayapal	Democratic	2016	Incumbent re-elected.	▌ ✓ Pramila Jayapal (Democratic); ▌Nirav Sheth (Republican)
Washington 8	D+3	Kim Schrier	Democratic	2018	Incumbent re-elected.	▌ ✓ Kim Schrier (Democratic); ▌Spencer Meline (Republican)
Washington 9	D+22	Adam Smith	Democratic	1996	Incumbent re-elected.	▌ ✓ Adam Smith (Democratic); ▌Doug Basler (Republican)
Washington 10	D+9	Marilyn Strickland	Democratic	2020	Incumbent re-elected.	▌ ✓ Marilyn Strickland (Democratic); ▌Chris Chung (Republican)

== West Virginia ==
District		Incumbent			This race	
Location	PVI	Member	Party	First elected	Results	Candidates
West Virginia 1	R+22	Carol Miller	Republican	2018	Incumbent re-elected.	▌ ✓ Carol Miller (Republican); ▌Vince George (Democratic); ▌Belinda Fox-Spencer (Constitution)
West Virginia 2	R+20	Riley Moore	Republican	2024	Incumbent re-elected.	▌ ✓ Riley Moore (Republican); ▌Ace Parsi (Democratic)

== Wisconsin ==
District		Incumbent			This race	
Location	PVI	Member	Party	First elected	Results	Candidates
Wisconsin 1	R+2	Bryan Steil	Republican	2018	Incumbent lost re-election. Democratic gain.	▌ ✓ Mitchell Berman (Democratic); ▌Bryan Steil (Republican)
Wisconsin 2	D+21	Mark Pocan	Democratic	2012	Incumbent re-elected.	▌ ✓ Mark Pocan (Democratic)
Wisconsin 3	R+3	Derrick Van Orden	Republican	2022	Incumbent lost re-election. Democratic gain.	▌ ✓ Rebecca Cooke (Democratic); ▌Derrick Van Orden (Republican); ▌Alexander Kent (Independent); ▌Rustin Provance (Independent)
Wisconsin 4	D+26	Gwen Moore	Democratic	2004	Incumbent re-elected.	▌ ✓ Gwen Moore (Democratic); ▌Tim Rogers (Republican); ▌Arthur Burks (Independent)
Wisconsin 5	R+11	Scott Fitzgerald	Republican	2020	Incumbent re-elected.	▌ ✓ Scott Fitzgerald (Republican); ▌Andrew Beck (Democratic)
Wisconsin 6	R+8	Glenn Grothman	Republican	2014	Incumbent re-elected.	▌ ✓ Glenn Grothman (Republican); ▌Brad Smith (Democratic); ▌Elizabeth Fitzgibbon (Independent); ▌Michael Thurow (Independent); ▌Matthew Arndt (Green)
Wisconsin 7	R+11	Tom Tiffany	Republican	2020 (special)	Incumbent retired to run for governor. Republican hold.	▌ ✓ Michael Alfonso (Republican); ▌Fred Clark (Democratic)
Wisconsin 8	R+8	Tony Wied	Republican	2024 (special)	Incumbent re-elected.	▌ ✓ Tony Wied (Republican); ▌Rick Crosson (Democratic)

== Wyoming ==
District		Incumbent			This race	
Location	PVI	Member	Party	First elected	Results	Candidates
Wyoming at-large	R+23	Harriet Hageman	Republican	2022	Incumbent retired to run for U.S. Senate. Republican hold.	▌ ✓ Chuck Gray (Republican) 54.2%; ▌Lisa Kinney (Democratic) 33.5%; ▌Shawn Johnson (Libertarian) 7.4%; ▌Jeffrey Haggit (Constitution) 4.3%

== Non-voting delegates ==
District	Incumbent			This race	
District	Delegate	Party	First elected	Results	Candidates
American Samoa at-large	Amata Coleman Radewagen	Republican	2014	Incumbent re-elected.	▌ ✓ Amata Coleman Radewagen (Republican) 60.7%; ▌Sandra King-Young (Democratic) 31.2%; ▌Tuifagaloa Afu Lefaoseu III (Independent) 4.5%; ▌Fualaau Rosie Lancaster (Independent) 2.0%; ▌Meleagi Suitonu-Chapman (Independent) 1.6%
District of Columbia at-large	Eleanor Holmes Norton	Democratic	1990	Incumbent retired. Democratic hold.	▌ ✓ Robert White (Democratic) 87.3%; ▌Denise Rosado (Republican) 6.3%; ▌Kymone Freeman (Statehood Green) 5.8%
Guam at-large	James Moylan	Republican	2022	Incumbent lost re-election. Democratic gain.	▌ ✓ Alicia Limtiaco (Democratic) 51.0%; ▌James Moylan (Republican) 48.9%
Northern Mariana Islands at-large	Kimberlyn King-Hinds	Republican	2024	Incumbent re-elected.	▌ ✓ Kimberlyn King-Hinds (Republican) 63.7%; ▌Galvin Deleon Guerrero (Independent) 36.3%
U.S. Virgin Islands at-large	Stacey Plaskett	Democratic	2014	Incumbent retired to run for governor. Democratic hold.	▌ ✓ Janelle Sarauw (Democratic) 76.9%; ▌Shelley Moorhead (Independent) 21.2%

== See also ==
- 2026 United States elections
  - 2026 United States Senate elections
  - 2026 United States gubernatorial elections
- 119th United States Congress
- 120th United States Congress
- 2025 Texas redistricting
- 2025–2026 United States redistricting
