= 119th United States Congress =

2025–2027 U.S. legislative term

←	118th	120th	→
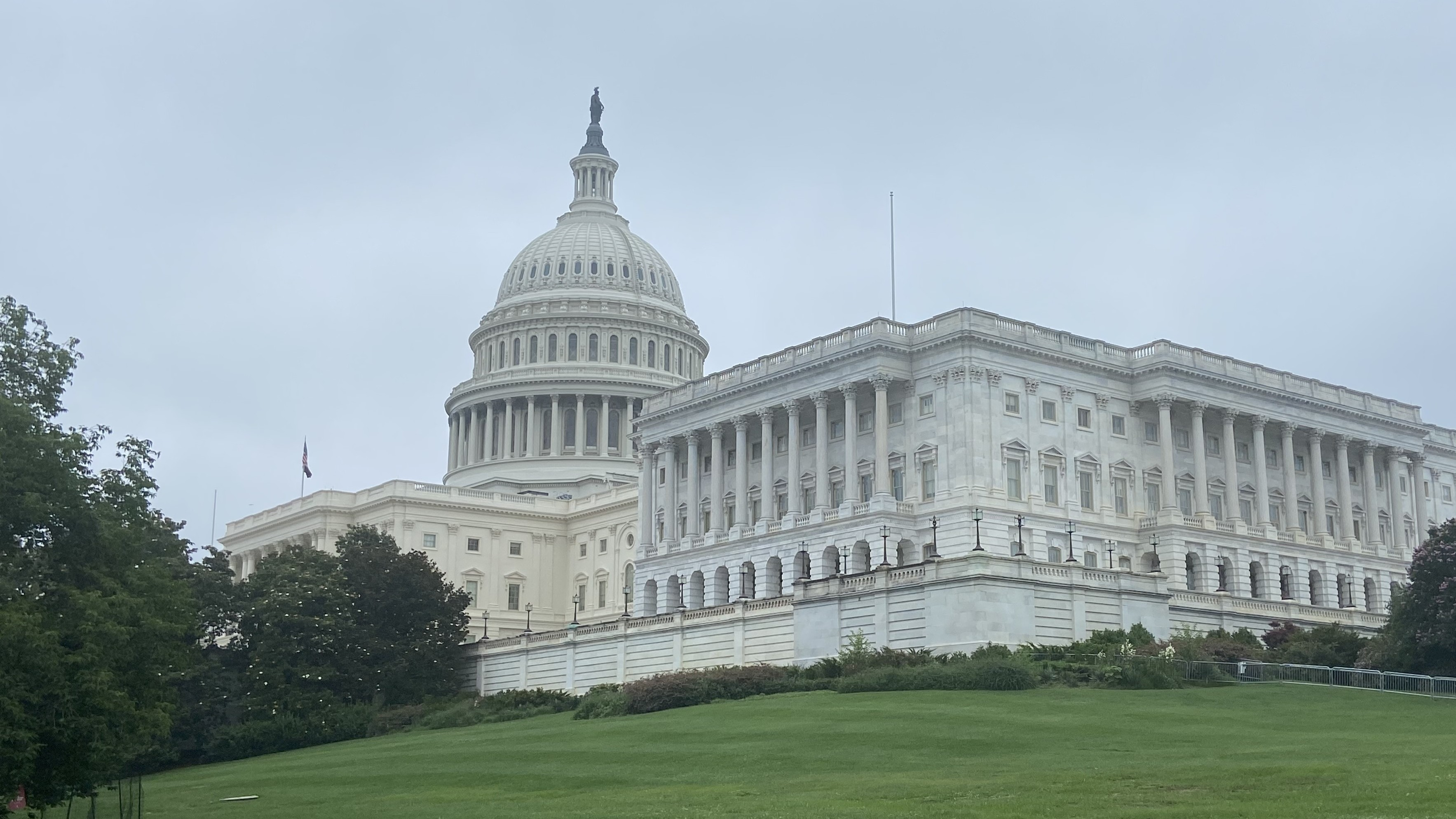
- United States Capitol (2025)

Overview
- Legislative body: United States Congress
- Jurisdiction: United States
- Term: January 3, 2025 – January 3, 2027

Senate
- Members: 100
- President: Kamala Harris (D) (Note: U.S. Vice President Kamala Harris's term as President of the Senate ended at noon January 20, 2025, when JD Vance's term began.) (until January 20, 2025); JD Vance (R) (since January 20, 2025)
- Party control: Republican

House of Representatives
- Members: 435 representatives 6 non-voting delegates
- Speaker: Mike Johnson (R)
- Party control: Republican

Sessions
- 1st: January 3, 2025 – January 3, 2026
- 2nd: January 3, 2026 – January 3, 2027

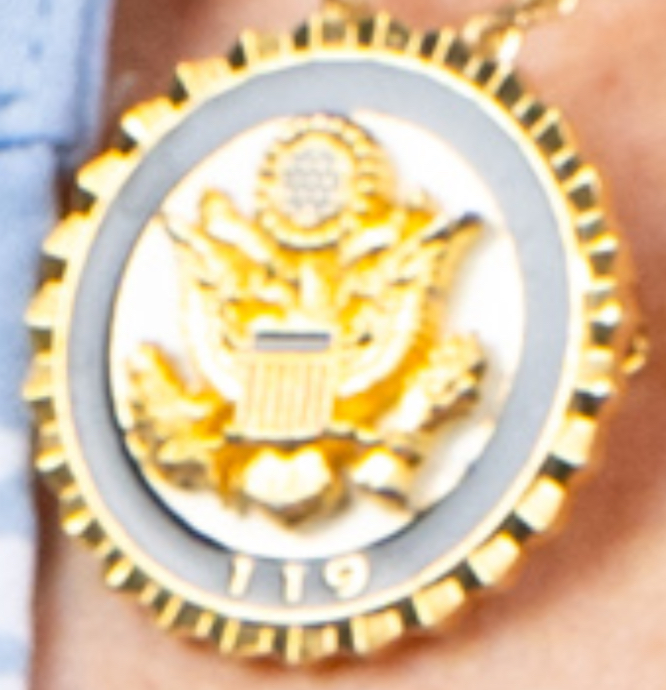
119th Congress House member pin

The 119th United States Congress is the current meeting of the legislative branch of the United States federal government, composed of the United States Senate and the United States House of Representatives. It convened on January 3, 2025, for the last 17 days of Joe Biden's presidency and continued during the first two years of Donald Trump's second presidency.

Following the 2024 elections, the Republican Party retained its slim majority in the House of Representatives (albeit with losing two net seats to end up with a three-seat majority). The Republican Party also won a three-seat majority in the Senate after winning four net seats. Upon Trump's second inauguration on January 20, 2025, the Republican Party has an overall federal government trifecta for the first time since the 115th Congress (2017–2019), which was in session during Trump's first term.

The 119th Congress features the slimmest majority in the House for any party since the 72nd Congress (1931–1933), and the first openly transgender member of Congress in history, Representative Sarah McBride (D-DE). It also features the fewest split Senate delegations since the passage of the Seventeenth Amendment, which established the direct election of U.S. senators. (Note: Maine, Pennsylvania, and Wisconsin all have senators from different parties. Vermont also has a split delegation; however, Bernie Sanders caucuses with the Democratic Party.)

Despite a trifecta, the first year of the Congress saw the lowest number of House votes in a nonelection year since the 101st Congress in 1990.

As of 2025, the 119th Congress has been one of the least productive when it comes to passing bills.

== History ==
In the 2024 elections, the Republican Party retained control of the House of Representatives and gained control of the Senate, while Republican nominee Donald Trump won the presidential election, securing a second non-consecutive term. The results of the election were attributed to economic conditions of voters and concerns over immigration, particularly the Mexico–United States border crisis.

The Senate flipped to a 53–47 Republican majority, and in their leadership elections, Senator John Thune of South Dakota was elected to succeed Mitch McConnell, who had been in power for 18 years.

The House assumed a 220–215 Republican majority, among the narrowest controlling majorities in House history with the 65th Congress. Mike Johnson was re-elected as speaker on the first ballot after initially not receiving enough votes on the roll call, with the vote remaining open until enough members changed votes to support him.

On January 6, a joint session convened to count the presidential Electoral College votes. The proceedings were peaceful, four years after the January 6 Capitol attack, in which supporters of Trump entered the Capitol and disrupted Joe Biden's certification as president. In response to the attack and Trump's efforts to overturn the 2020 election, Congress has passed revisions to the Electoral Count Act that explicitly prevent the vice president from obstructing the count and significantly raise the bar for objections by congressmembers.

Comprising 80% of the membership of the House of Representatives and 89% of the Senate, Baby boomers and Generation X remained the largest generations represented in Congress after having comprised more than 80% of the membership of both chambers since at least the 115th United States Congress and Baby boomers alone comprising the majority of the House of Representatives and the Senate since the 106th United States Congress and the 111th United States Congress respectively.

== Major events ==
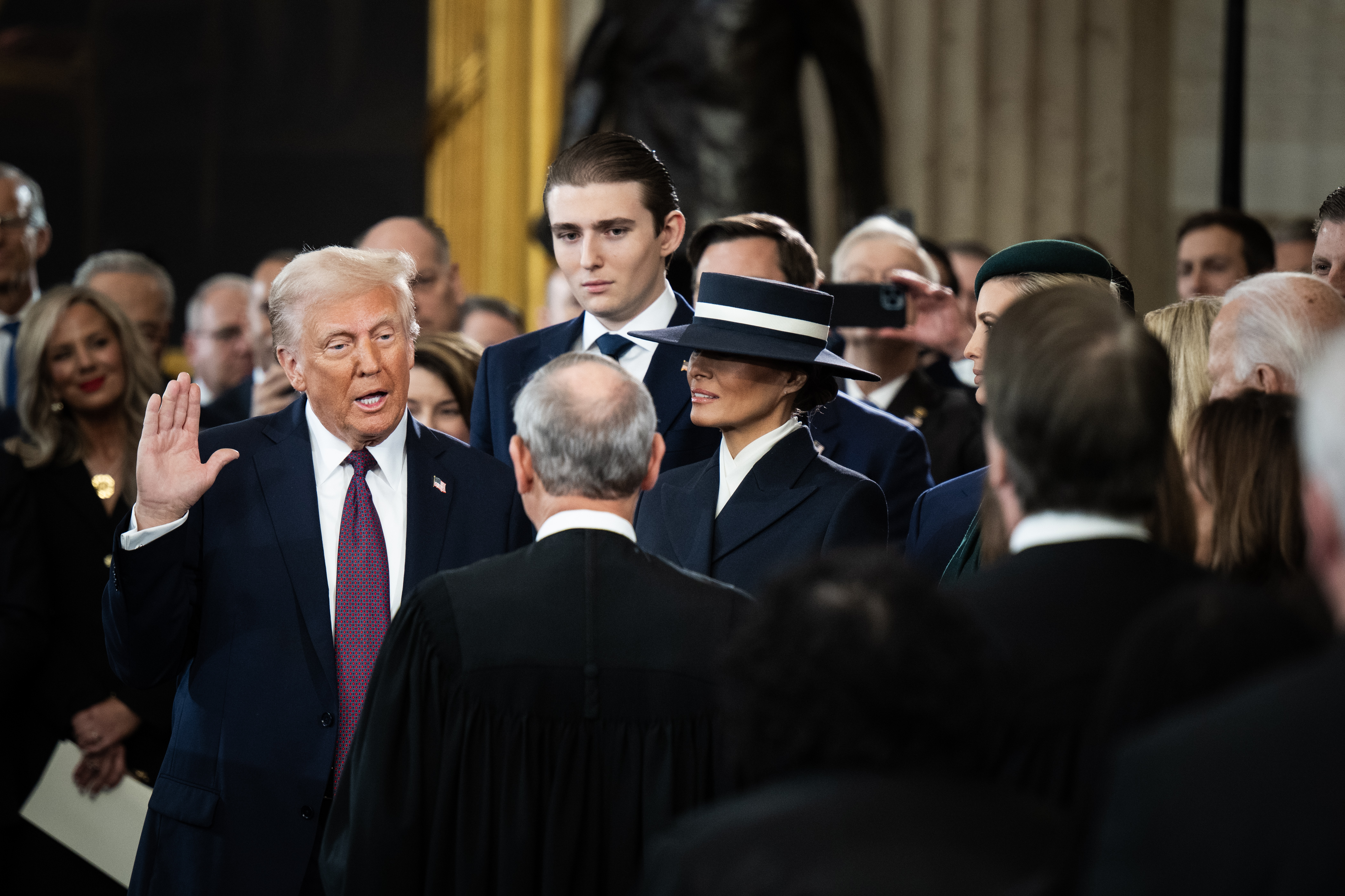
Donald Trump takes the oath of office as the 47th president of the United States

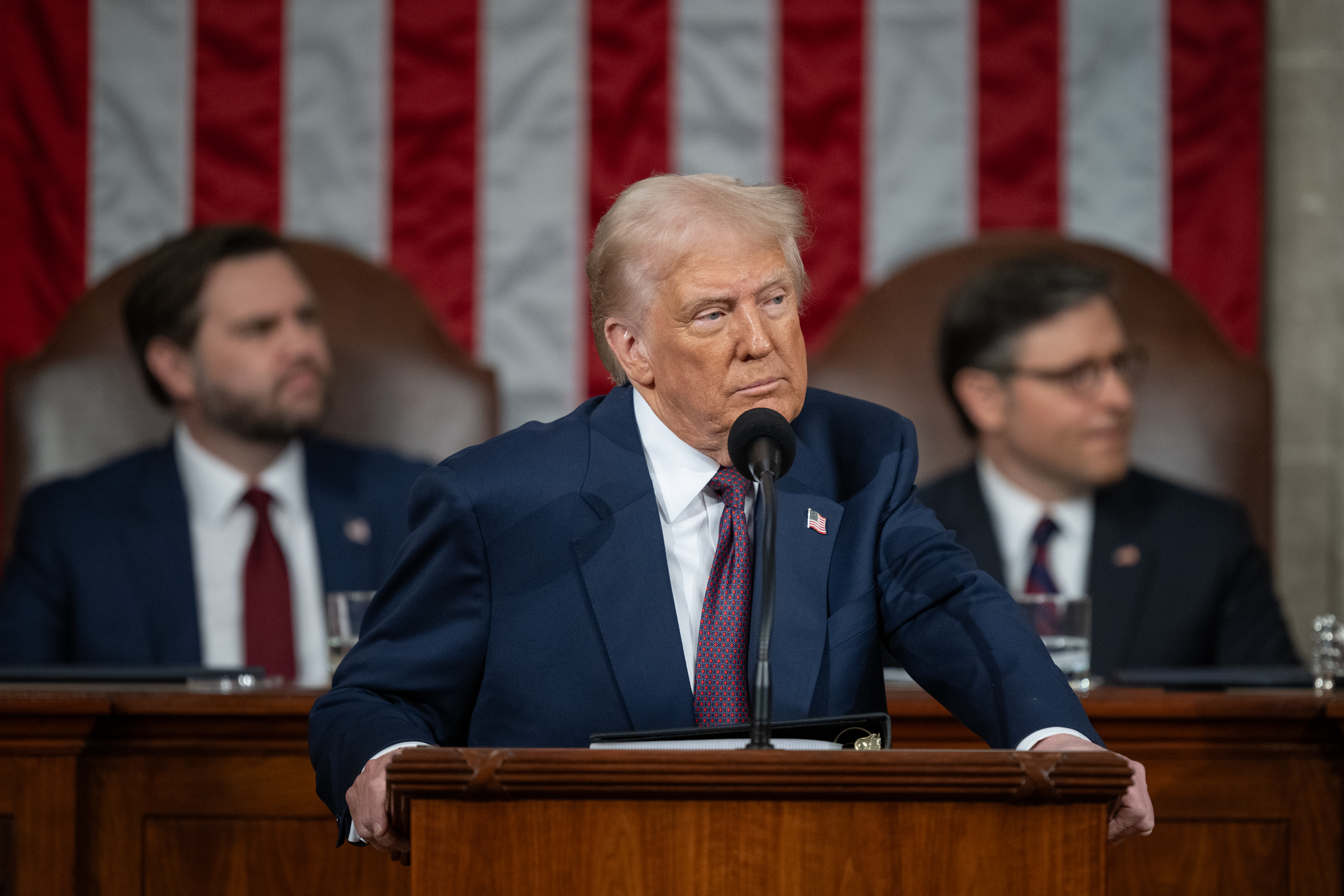
President Trump during his 2025 speech to a joint session of Congress, with Vice President JD Vance and House Speaker Mike Johnson.

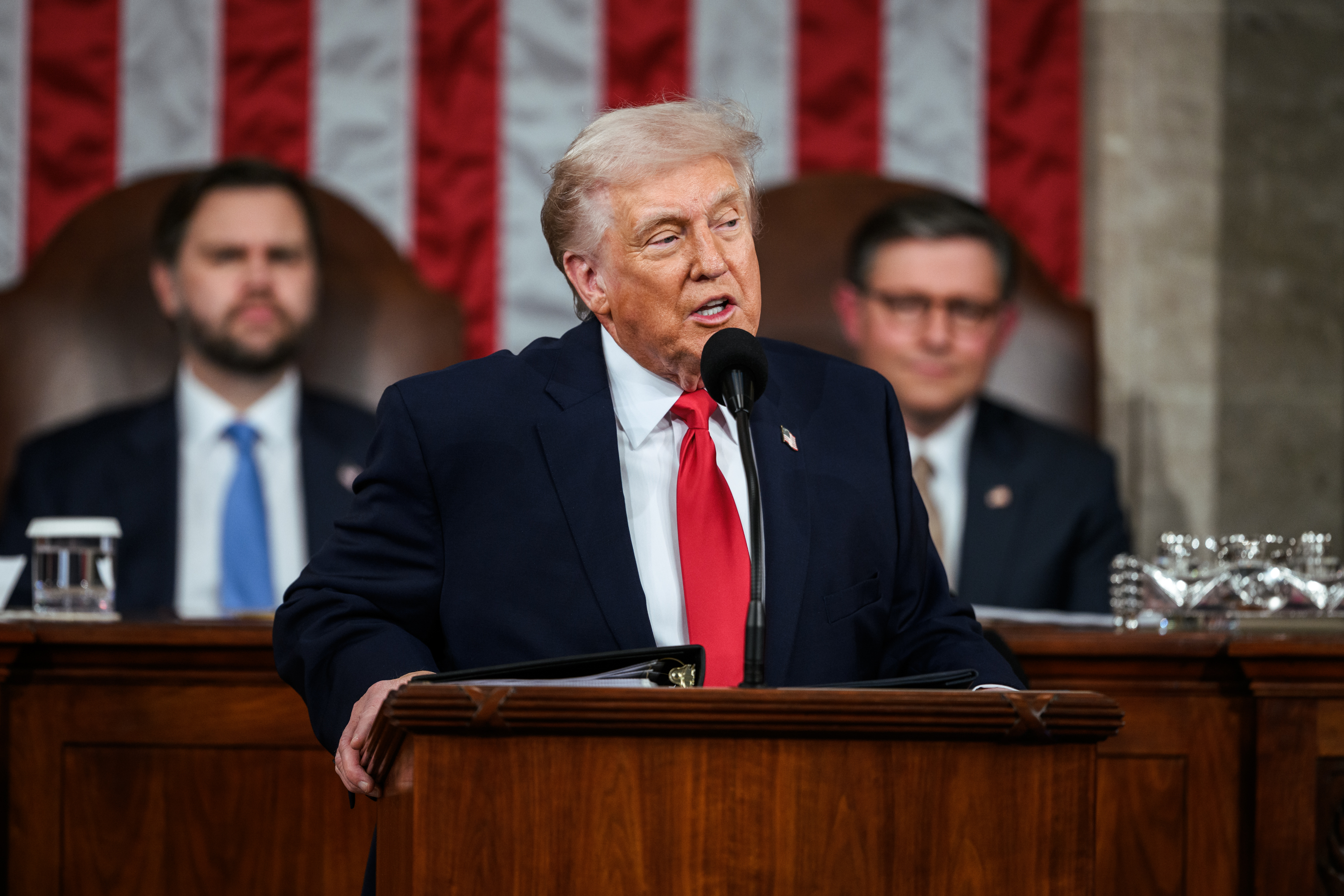
President Trump during his 2026 State of the Union Address, with Vice President Vance and House Speaker Johnson.

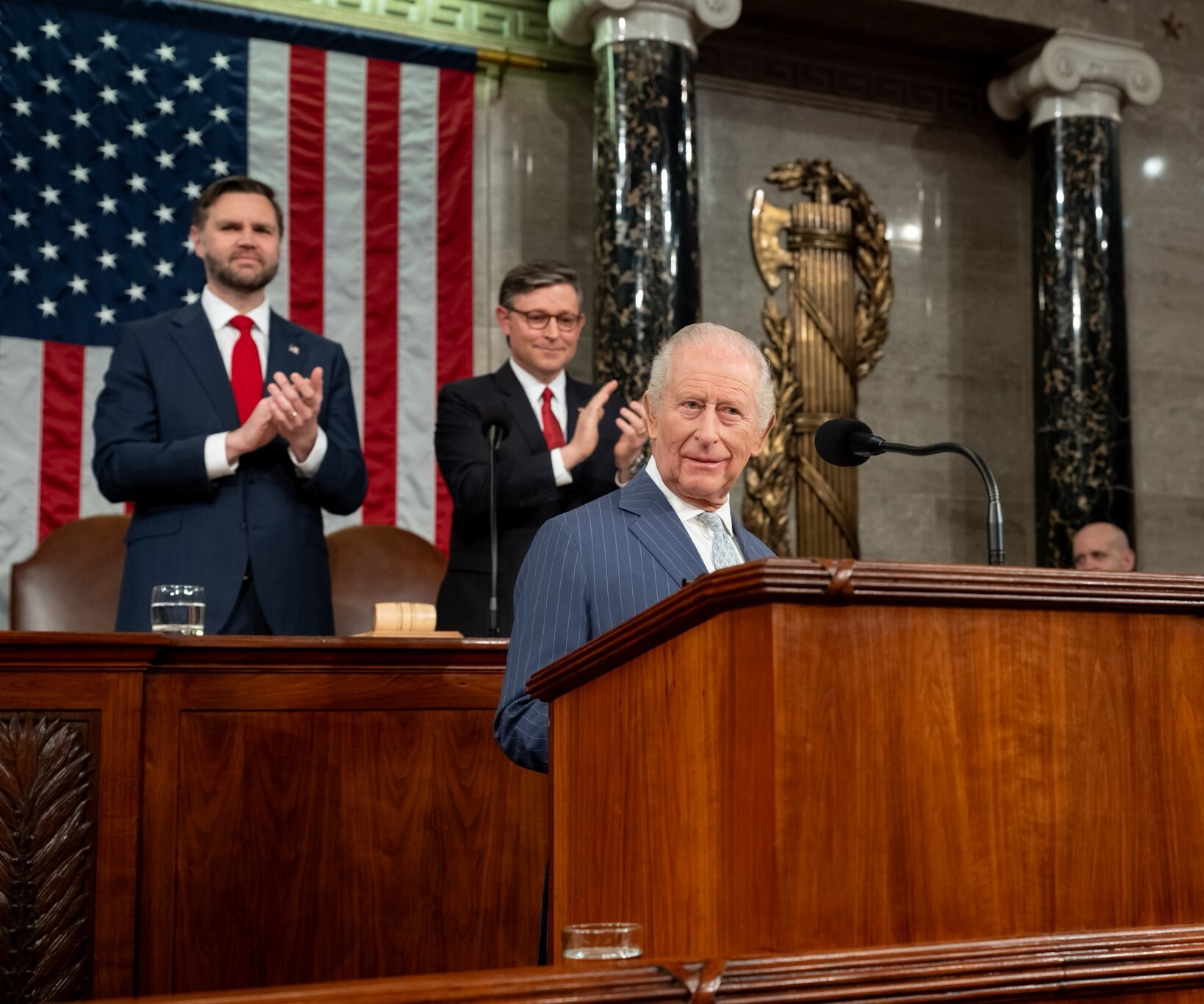
King Charles III addressing the Congress, with Vice President Vance and House Speaker Mike Johnson

- January 3, 2025, 12 p.m. EST: Congress convenes. Members-elect of the United States Senate and the United States House of Representatives are sworn in. Mike Johnson (R) is re-elected as speaker on the first ballot after initially not receiving enough votes on the roll call, with Ralph Norman and Keith Self changing their votes to support him.
- January 6, 2025: A joint session to count the presidential Electoral College votes is held.
- January 9, 2025: The funeral of former president Jimmy Carter takes place.
- January 20, 2025: The second inauguration of Donald Trump takes place. The Republicans gain a trifecta.
- January 24, 2025: Vice President JD Vance casts the tie-breaking vote to confirm Pete Hegseth as Secretary of Defense. This was the second time in United States history that a cabinet confirmation was tied in the Senate and required a tie-breaking vote. The first was when Mike Pence cast the tie-breaking vote to confirm Betsy DeVos as Secretary of Education in Trump's first term.
- March 4, 2025: President Donald Trump addresses a joint session of Congress.
- March 5, 2025: Representative Sylvester Turner (D) of Texas dies.
- March 6, 2025: The House votes 224–198 (2 present) to censure Representative Al Green (D) of Texas for repeatedly disrupting (by speaking out of turn) President Donald Trump's address to a joint session of Congress.
- March 13, 2025: Representative Raúl Grijalva (D) of Arizona dies.
- March 31 – April 1, 2025: Senator Cory Booker of New Jersey breaks the record for the longest Senate speech, protesting President Donald Trump's agenda.
- May 21, 2025: Representative Gerry Connolly (D) of Virginia dies.
- July 3, 2025: House minority leader Hakeem Jeffries of New York breaks the record for the longest House magic minute speech while speaking against the "One Big Beautiful Bill".
- July 20, 2025: Representative Mark Green (R) of Tennessee resigns.
- October 1 – November 12, 2025: The federal government shuts down as a result of Congress not approving a budget.
- November 12, 2025: Representative Adelita Grijalva (D) of Arizona is sworn in 50 days after winning the 2025 Arizona's 7th congressional district special election, setting the new record for the longest delay of a representative to be sworn in.
- November 20, 2025: Representative Mikie Sherrill (D) of New Jersey resigns after winning the 2025 New Jersey gubernatorial election.
- January 5, 2026: Representative Marjorie Taylor Greene (R) of Georgia resigns.
- January 6, 2026: Representative Doug LaMalfa (R) of California dies.
- January 31 – February 3, 2026: The federal government partially shuts down as a result of Congress not approving a budget.
- February 14 – April 30, 2026: A second shutdown occurs, affecting only the Department of Homeland Security as a result of Congress not approving a budget.
- February 24, 2026: President Trump delivers the 2026 State of the Union Address.
- March 9, 2026: Representative Kevin Kiley of California leaves the Republican Party and registers as an independent.
- March 23, 2026: Senator Markwayne Mullin from Oklahoma resigns after being confirmed as Secretary of Homeland Security.
- April 14, 2026: Following allegations of sexual misconduct, Representatives Tony Gonzales (R) of Texas and Eric Swalwell (D) of California resign.
- April 21, 2026: Representative Sheila Cherfilus-McCormick (D) of Florida resigns following the House Ethics Committee investigation and a grand jury indicting her for financial fraud.
- April 22, 2026: Representative David Scott (D) of Georgia dies.
- April 28, 2026: King Charles III addresses a joint session of Congress, becoming the first British monarch to do so since his mother, Queen Elizabeth II, in 1991.
- July 11, 2026: Senator Lindsey Graham (R) of South Carolina dies.
- September 1, 2026: The House votes 413–2 to censure Representative Chuck Edwards (R) of North Carolina, following a House Ethics Committee investigation that concluded he engaged in persistent unprofessional and inappropriate conduct toward two young female staffers.

== Major legislation ==
=== Enacted ===
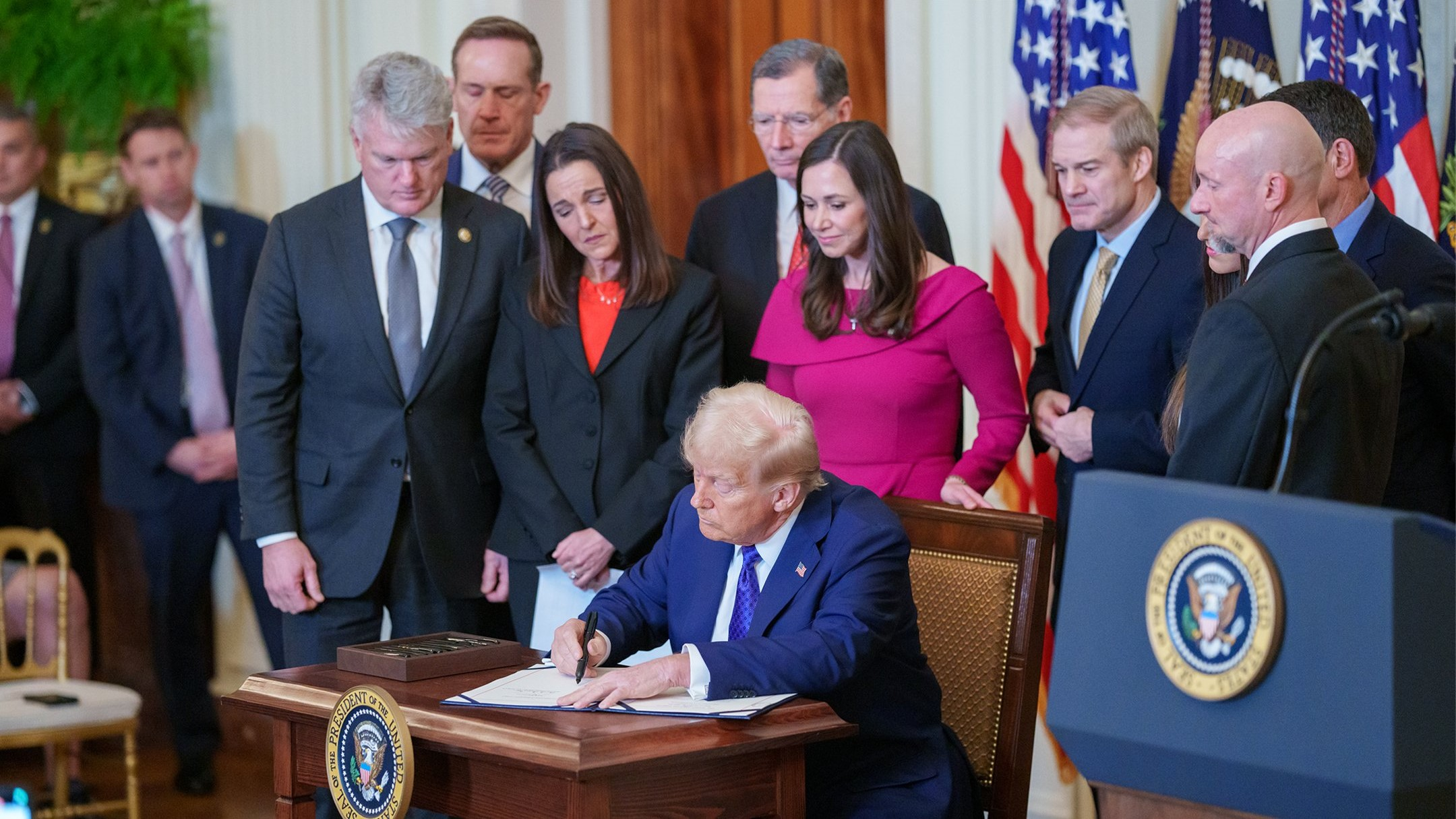
President Trump signing the Laken Riley Act into law on January 29, 2025

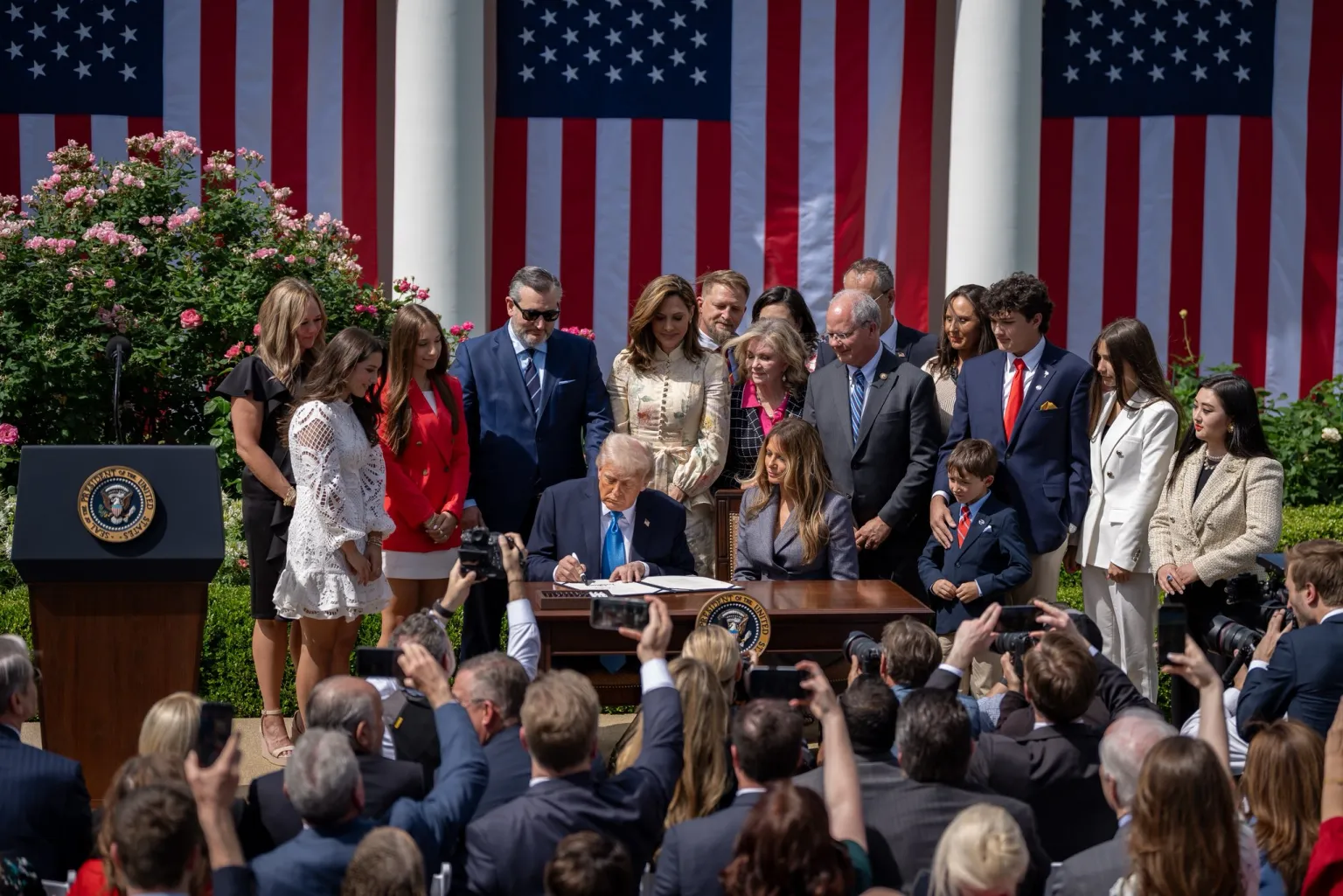
President Trump signing the TAKE IT DOWN Act into law on May 19, 2025

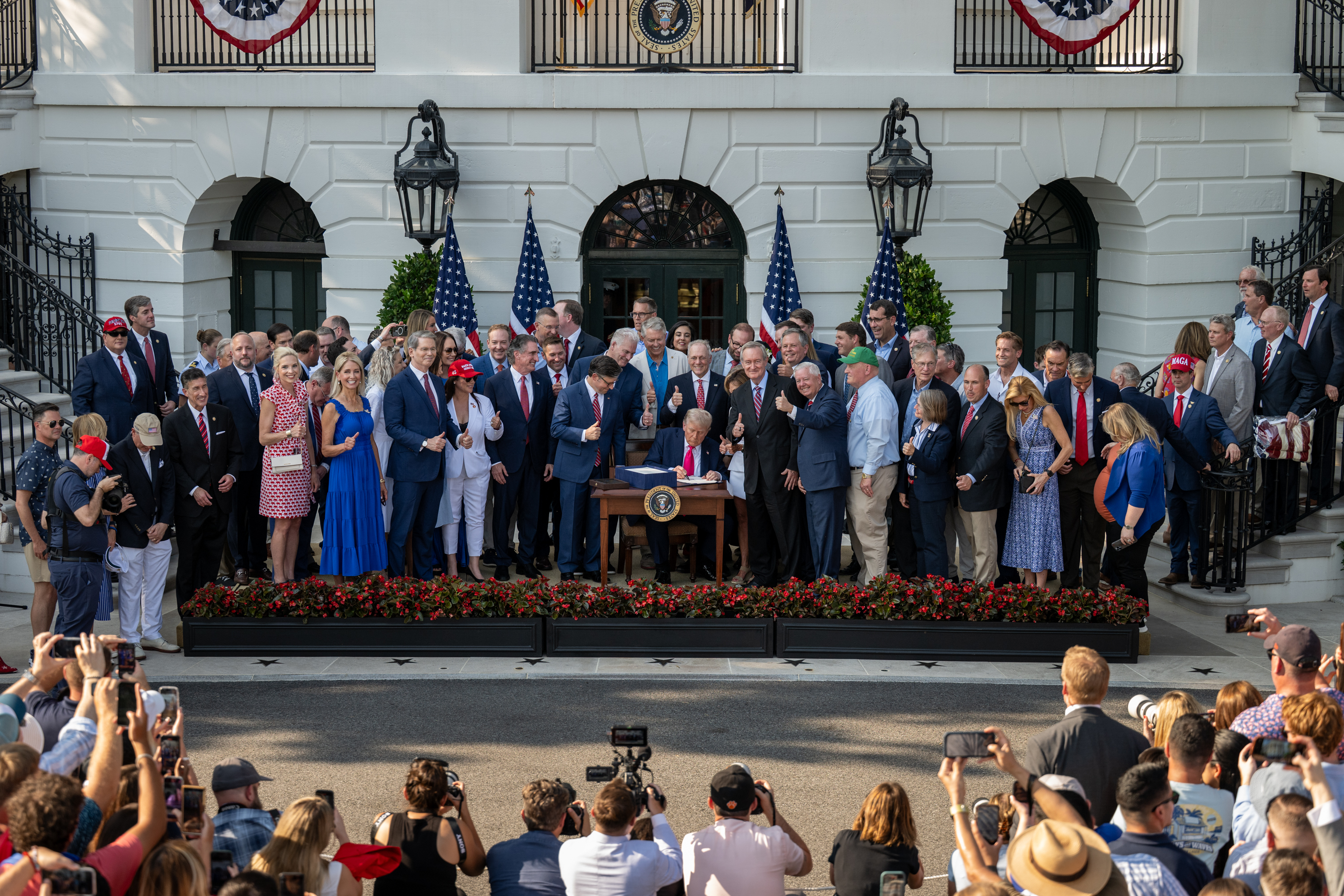
President Trump signing the One Big Beautiful Bill Act into law on July 4, 2025

President Trump after signing the Sanctioning Russia Act into law on September 18, 2026

- January 29, 2025: Laken Riley Act, S. 5
- March 15, 2025: Full-Year Continuing Appropriations and Other Extensions Act, H.R. 1968
- May 19, 2025: TAKE IT DOWN Act, S. 146
- June 12, 2025: Aerial Firefighting Enhancement Act of 2025, S. 160
- July 4, 2025: One Big Beautiful Bill Act, H.R. 1
- July 7, 2025: Alaska Native Settlement Trust Eligibility Act, H.R. 42
- July 7, 2025: Alaska Native Village Municipal Lands Restoration Act of 2025, H.R. 43
- July 15, 2025: Apex Area Technical Corrections Act, H.R. 618
- July 15, 2025: Salem Maritime National Historical Park Redesignation and Boundary Study Act, H.R. 2215
- July 16, 2025: HALT Fentanyl Act, S. 331
- July 18, 2025: GENIUS Act, S. 1582
- July 24, 2025: Rescissions Act of 2025, H.R. 4
- July 24, 2025: Filing Relief for Natural Disasters Act, H.R. 517
- July 24, 2025: Jocelyn Nungaray National Wildlife Refuge Act, S. 1596
- July 30, 2025: VA Home Loan Program Reform Act, H.R. 1815
- August 14, 2025: ACES Act of 2025, S. 201
- August 14, 2025: PRO Veterans Act of 2025, S. 423
- August 19, 2025: Maintaining American Superiority by Improving Export Control Transparency Act, H.R. 1316
- September 5, 2025: Homebuyers Privacy Protection Act, H.R. 2808
- November 12, 2025: Continuing Appropriations and Extensions Act, H.R. 5371
- November 19, 2025: Epstein Files Transparency Act, H.R. 4405
- November 25, 2025: Internal Revenue Service Math and Taxpayer Help Act, H.R. 998
- December 1, 2025: Medal of Honor Act, H.R. 695
- December 12, 2025: Fairness for Servicemembers and their Families Act of 2025, H.R. 970
- December 12, 2025: Montgomery GI Bill Selected Reserves Tuition Fairness Act of 2025, H.R. 983
- December 18, 2025: National Defense Authorization Act for Fiscal Year 2026, H.R. 3838
- December 19, 2025: Wounded Knee Massacre Memorial and Sacred Site Act, H.R. 165
- December 26, 2025: Disaster Related Extension of Deadlines Act, H.R. 1491
- January 20, 2026: Disabled Veterans Housing Support Act, H.R. 224
- February 3, 2026: Consolidated Appropriations Act, 2026, H.R. 7148
- June 10, 2026: Secure America Act, S. 2
- July 11, 2026: 21st Century ROAD to Housing Act, H.R. 6644
- September 18, 2026: Sanctioning Russia Act, H.R. 5334

=== Proposed (but not enacted) ===
Passed in Congress, but vetoed by President

- H.R. 131: Finish the Arkansas Valley Conduit Act, 2026
- H.R. 504: Miccosukee Reserved Area Amendments Act, 2026

Bills passed in the House waiting for the Senate

- H.R. 21: Born-Alive Abortion Survivors Protection Act
- H.R. 22: Safeguard American Voter Eligibility Act
- H.R. 23: Illegitimate Court Counteraction Act
- H.R. 26: Protecting American Energy Production Act
- H.R. 27: Halt All Lethal Trafficking of Fentanyl Act
- H.R. 28: Protection of Women and Girls in Sports Act
- H.R. 30: Preventing Violence Against Women by Illegal Aliens Act
- H.R. 33: United States-Taiwan Expedited Double-Tax Relief Act
- H.R. 35: Agent Raul Gonzalez Officer Safety Act
- H.R. 36: MEGOBARI Act
- H.R. 77: Midnight Rules Relief Act
- H.R. 144: Tennessee Valley Authority Salary Transparency Act
- H.R. 152: Federal Disaster Assistance Coordination Act
- H.R. 153: Post-Disaster Assistance Online Accountability Act
- H.R. 164: Promoting Opportunities to Widen Electrical Resilience Act of 2025
- H.R. 186: Hershel Woody Williams National Medal of Honor Monument Location Act
- H.R. 187: Modernizing Access to our Public Waters Act of 2025
- H.R. 189: Securities and Exchange Commission Real Estate Leasing Authority Revocation Act
- H.R. 192: Amtrak Executive Bonus Disclosure Act
- H.R. 197: Lake Winnibigoshish Land Exchange Act of 2025
- H.R. 204: Accurately Counting Risk Elimination Solutions Act
- H.R. 207: Supporting the Health of Aquatic systems through Research Knowledge and Enhanced Dialogue Act of 2025
- H.R. 226: Eastern Band of Cherokee Historic Lands Reacquisition Act
- H.R. 275: Special Interest Alien Reporting Act of 2025
- H.R. 276: Gulf of America Act
- H.R. 359: Cost-Share Accountability Act of 2025
- H.R. 375: Continued Rapid Ohia Death Response Act of 2025
- H.R. 386: Chinese Currency Accountability Act of 2025
- H.R. 469: Semiquincentennial Congressional Time Capsule Act
- H.R. 471: Fix Our Forests Act
- H.R. 495: Subterranean Border Defense Act
- H.R. 579: Recruiting Families Using Data Act of 2025
- H.R. 586: Vietnam Veterans Liver Fluke Cancer Study Act
- H.R. 692: China Exchange Rate Transparency Act of 2023
- H.R. 706: DHS Biodetection Improvement Act
- H.R. 708: Strategic Homeland Intelligence and Enforcement Legislation to Defend Against the CCP Act
- H.R. 730: Mathematical and Statistical Modeling Education Act
- H.R. 736: Protect Small Businesses from Excessive Paperwork Act of 2025
- H.R. 754: Investing in Main Street Act of 2025
- H.R. 758: Mail Traffic Deaths Reporting Act of 2025
- H.R. 776: Nutria Eradication and Control Reauthorization Act of 2025
- H.R. 788: DOE and SBA Research Act
- H.R. 804: Rural Small Business Resilience Act
- H.R. 818: Small Business Procurement and Utilization Reform Act of 2025
- H.R. 825: Assisting Small Businesses Not Fraudsters Act
- H.R. 828: Successful Entrepreneurship for Reservists and Veterans Act
- H.R. 832: Small Business Advocacy Improvements Act of 2025
- H.R. 835: 9/11 Memorial and Museum Act
- H.R. 836: Emergency Wildfire Fighting Technology Act of 2025
- H.R. 856: Safe and Smart Federal Purchasing Act
- H.R. 862: TSA Commuting Fairness Act
- H.R. 872: Federal Contractor Cybersecurity Vulnerability Reduction Act of 2025
- H.R. 877: Deliver for Veterans Act
- H.R. 901: Research Security and Accountability in DHS Act
- H.R. 919: Chronic Disease Flexible Coverage Act
- H.R. 965: Housing Unhoused Disabled Veterans Act
- H.R. 975: Credit Union Board Modernization Act
- H.R. 993: Emerging Innovative Border Technologies Act
- H.R. 997: National Taxpayer Advocate Enhancement Act of 2025
- H.R. 1039: Clear Communication for Veterans Claims Act
- H.R. 1048: Defending Education Transparency and Ending Rogue Regimes Engaging in Nefarious Transactions Act
- H.R. 1152: Electronic Filing and Payment Fairness Act
- H.R. 1155: Recovery of Stolen Checks Act
- H.R. 1156: Pandemic Unemployment Fraud Enforcement Act
- H.R. 1166: Decoupling from Foreign Adversarial Battery Dependence Act
- H.R. 1318: United States Research Protection Act
- H.R. 1325: Commercial Remote Sensing Amendment Act of 2025
- H.R. 1326: DOE and USDA Interagency Research Act
- H.R. 1350: DOE and NSF Interagency Research Act
- H.R. 1368: DOE and NASA Interagency Research Coordination Act
- H.R. 1374: Securing the Cities Improvement Act
- H.R. 1515: Guidance Out of Darkness Act
- H.R. 1526: No Rogue Rulings Act
- H.R. 1534: Innovative Mitigation Partnerships for Asphalt and Concrete Technologies Act
- H.R. 1692: Producing Advanced Technologies for Homeland Security Act
- H.R. 1701: Strategic Ports Reporting Act
- H.R. 1919: Anti-CBDC Surveillance State Act
- H.R. 1969: No Wrong Door for Veterans Act
- H.R. 2591: Mental Health in Aviation Act of 2025
- H.R. 3633: Digital Asset Market Clarity Act of 2025
- H.R. 6028: Legislative Branch Agencies Clarification Act

Bills proposed in the House

- H.R. 12: Women's Health Protection Act
- H.R. 14: John Lewis Voting Rights Advancement Act
- H.R. 15: Equality Act
- H.R. 17: Paycheck Fairness Act
- H.R. 18: Bipartisan Background Checks Act
- H.R. 20: Richard L. Trumka Protecting the Right to Organize Act of 2025
- H.R. 38: Concealed Carry Reciprocity Act (ordered by committee to be amended on March 25, 2025)
- H.R. 40: Commission to Study and Develop Reparation Proposals for African-Americans Act
- H.R. 277: Matthew Lawrence Perna Act of 2025
- H.R. 1229: United States-Israel Defense Partnership Act of 2025
- H.R. 1862: English Language Unity Act of 2025
- H.R. 2392: STABLE Act of 2025
- H.R. 3492: Protect Children's Innocence Act of 2025
- H.R. 3565: Block the Bombs Act
- H.R. 4327: No Tax on Home Sales Act
- H.R. 4403: Clear Skies Act
- H.R. 8250: Parents Decide Act
- H.R. 9694: Epstein Files Transparency Act II

Bills passed in the Senate waiting for the House

- S. 32: Local Access to Courts Act
- S. 129: No Tax on Tips Act
- S. 524: Coast Guard Authorization Act of 2025
- S. 960: Justice for Murder Victims Act
- S. 1077: District of Columbia Local Funds Act, 2025
- S. 5653: Bipartisan American Affordability and Jobs Act of 2026

Bills proposed in the Senate

- S. 29: Sunshine Protection Act
- S. 476: White Oak Resiliency Act of 2025
- S. 476: Background Check Expansion Act
- S. 500: CAREER Act of 2025
- S. 698: Federal Prisons Accountability Act of 2025
- S. 852: Richard L. Trumka Protecting the Right to Organize Act of 2025
- S. 1046: No Tax on Overtime Act
- S. 1124: Anti-CBDC Surveillance State Act
- S. 1241: Sanctioning Russia Act
- S. 1272: Trade Review Act
- S. 1325: Foreign Pollution Fee Act
- S. 1503: Equality Act
- S. 1674: Mammoth Cave National Park Boundary Adjustment Act of 2025
- S. 2150: Women's Health Protection Act
- S. 2572: Department of Defense Appropriations Act, 2026
- S. 3855: United States-Israel FUTURES Act
- S. 4576: Jewish American Security Act
- S. 4668: Protect College Sports Act of 2026

Bills in Conference Committee

- H.R. 3944: Military Construction, Veterans Affairs, and Related Agencies Appropriations Act, 2026

== Major resolutions ==
=== Adopted ===
- H.Res. 5: Setting the Rules of the House this Congress, with changes from the previous Congress.
- H.Res. 189: Censuring Al Green for disrupting the President's speech to a joint session of Congress.
- S.Con.Res. 3: Allowing the Capitol rotunda to be used for Jimmy Carter's lying in state.
- S.Res. 377: Executive resolution authorizing the en bloc consideration in Executive Session of certain nominations on the Executive Calendar.
- H.Con.Res.86: Directing the President, pursuant to section 5(c) of the War Powers Resolution, to remove United States Armed Forces from hostilities with Iran.
- H.Res.1498: In the matter of allegations relating to Representative Chuck Edwards.

=== Proposed ===
- H.Res. 24: Expunging the first impeachment of Donald Trump.
- H.Res. 25: Expunging the second impeachment of Donald Trump.
- H.Res. 353: Impeaching Donald Trump (proposal by Shri Thanedar)
- H.Res. 537: Impeaching Donald Trump (proposal by Al Green)
- H.Res. 1155: Proposed to establish a commission on invoking the Twenty-fifth Amendment to the United States Constitution
- H.Res. 1239: 2026 Antisemitism Resolution
- H.Res. 1339: 2026 Netanyahu Resolution

== Party summary ==
Resignations and new members are discussed in the "Changes in membership" section:

=== Senate party summary ===
Senate membership

July 14, 2026 – present

	Party (shading shows control)			Total	Vacant
	Democratic	Independent (Note: All self-identified independents caucus with the Democrats.)	Republican	Total	Vacant
End of previous Congress	47	4	49	100	0
Begin (January 3, 2025) (Note: In West Virginia: Senator-elect Jim Justice (R) delayed taking his seat until January 14, 2025, to finish his term as Governor of West Virginia.)	45	2	52	99	1
January 10, 2025 (Note: In Ohio: JD Vance (R) resigned on January 10, 2025, in anticipation of becoming Vice President of the United States. After this resignation, Ohio Governor Mike DeWine appointed Lieutenant Governor Jon Husted to fill his seat on January 21, 2025.)	45	2	51	98	2
January 14, 2025 (Note: In West Virginia: Senator Jim Justice (R) took office on January 14, 2025, after finishing his term as Governor of West Virginia.)	45	2	52	99	1
January 20, 2025 (Note: In Florida: Senator Marco Rubio (R) resigned from the Senate on January 20, 2025, after the Senate confirmed him as Secretary of State. Florida Attorney General Ashley Moody was sworn in to fill his seat on January 21, 2025.)	45	2	51	98	2
January 21, 2025	45	2	53	100	0
March 23, 2026 (Note: In Oklahoma: Senator Markwayne Mullin (R) resigned from the Senate on March 23, 2026, after the Senate confirmed him as Secretary of Homeland Security. Alan Armstrong was sworn in to fill his seat on March 24, 2026.)	45	2	52	99	1
March 24, 2026	45	2	53	100	0
July 11, 2026 (Note: In South Carolina: Senator Lindsey Graham (R) died on July 11, 2026. Darline Graham was sworn in to fill his seat on July 14, 2026.)	45	2	52	99	1
July 14, 2026	45	2	53	100	0
Current voting share	47.0%		53.0%		

=== House party summary ===
House membership

September 2, 2026 – Present

September 1, 2026 – September 2, 2026

June 10, 2026 – September 1, 2026

April 22, 2026 – June 10, 2026

April 21, 2026 – April 22, 2026

April 20, 2026 – April 21, 2026

April 14, 2026 – April 20, 2026

March 9, 2026 – April 14, 2026

February 2, 2026 – March 9, 2026

January 6, 2026 – February 2, 2026

January 5, 2026 – January 6, 2026

December 4, 2025 – January 5, 2026

November 20, 2025 – December 4, 2025

November 12, 2025 – November 20, 2025

September 10, 2025 – November 12, 2025

July 20, 2025 – September 10, 2025

May 21, 2025 – July 20, 2025

April 2, 2025 – May 21, 2025

March 13, 2025 – April 2, 2025

March 5, 2025 – March 13, 2025

January 20, 2025 – March 5, 2025

Begin (January 3, 2025 – January 20, 2025)

	Party (shading shows control)			Total	Vacant
	Democratic	Independent (Note: Independent Kevin Kiley caucuses with the Republicans.)	Republican	Total	Vacant
End of previous Congress	210	0	219	429	6
Begin (January 3, 2025) (Note: In Florida's 1st district: Matt Gaetz (R) resigned during the previous Congress after winning re-election and chose not to take office in the 119th Congress, and Jimmy Patronis was elected April 1, 2025. He was sworn in on April 2, 2025.)	215	0	219	434	1
January 20, 2025 (Note: In Florida's 6th district: Mike Waltz (R) resigned on January 20, 2025, to become United States National Security Advisor, and Randy Fine was elected April 1, 2025. He was sworn in on April 2, 2025.)	215	0	218	433	2
March 5, 2025 (Note: In Texas's 18th district: Sylvester Turner (D) died on March 5, 2025. A special election was held on November 4, 2025, and Christian Menefee was elected in a runoff on January 31, 2026. He was sworn in on February 2, 2026.)	214	0	218	432	3
March 13, 2025 (Note: In Arizona's 7th district: Raúl Grijalva (D) died on March 13, 2025. Adelita Grijalva was elected on September 23, 2025. She was sworn in on November 12, 2025.)	213	0	218	431	4
April 2, 2025	213	0	220	433	2
May 21, 2025 (Note: In Virginia's 11th district: Gerry Connolly (D) died on May 21, 2025. James Walkinshaw was elected on September 9, 2025. He was sworn in on September 10, 2025.)	212	0	220	432	3
July 20, 2025 (Note: In Tennessee's 7th district: Mark Green (R) resigned on July 20, 2025, and Matt Van Epps was elected on December 2, 2025. He was sworn in on December 4, 2025.)	212	0	219	431	4
September 10, 2025	213	0	219	432	3
November 12, 2025	214	0	219	433	2
November 20, 2025 (Note: In New Jersey's 11th district: Mikie Sherrill (D) resigned on November 20, 2025, in anticipation of becoming Governor of New Jersey, and Analilia Mejia was elected on April 16, 2026. She was sworn in on April 20.)	213	0	219	432	3
December 4, 2025	213	0	220	433	2
January 5, 2026 (Note: In Georgia's 14th district: Marjorie Taylor Greene (R) resigned on January 5, 2026. A special election to elect a successor was held on March 10, 2026, and Clay Fuller was elected in the runoff held on April 7, 2026. He was sworn in on April 14, 2026.)	213	0	219	432	3
January 6, 2026 (Note: In California's 1st district: Doug LaMalfa (R) died on January 6, 2026, and James Gallagher was elected on June 2, 2026. He was sworn in on June 10, 2026.)	213	0	218	431	4
February 2, 2026	214	0	218	432	3
March 9, 2026 (Note: In California's 3rd district: Kevin Kiley (R) announced on March 6, 2026 that he would run for re-election as an independent, switching from the 3rd district to the 6th district; he officially declared himself an independent on March 9, 2026. He continues to caucus with the Republican conference.)	214	1	217	432	3
April 14, 2026 (Note: In California's 14th district: Eric Swalwell (D) resigned on April 14, 2026. A special election to elect a successor was held on June 16, 2026, and a runoff was held on August 18 where Aisha Wahab was elected. She was sworn in on September 2, 2026.) (Note: In Texas's 23rd district: Tony Gonzales (R) resigned on April 14, 2026. A special election to elect a successor will be held on a date TBD.)	213	1	217	431	4
April 20, 2026	214	1	217	432	3
April 21, 2026 (Note: In Florida's 20th district: Sheila Cherfilus-McCormick (D) resigned on April 21, 2026. A special election will not be held before the 2026 House elections in Florida.)	213	1	217	431	4
April 22, 2026 (Note: In Georgia's 13th district: David Scott died on April 22, 2026. A special election was held on July 28, 2026, and a runoff was held on August 25 where Everton Blair was elected. He was sworn in on September 1, 2026.)	212	1	217	430	5
June 10, 2026	212	1	218	431	4
September 1, 2026	213	1	218	432	3
September 2, 2026	214	1	218	433	2
Current voting share	49.4%	50.6%			
Non-voting members	3 (Note: Includes a Popular Democratic Party member who is also affiliated as a Democrat.)	0	3	6	0

== Leadership ==
Note: Democrats refer to themselves as a "caucus"; Republicans refer to themselves as a "conference".

=== Senate leadership ===
Senate Presidents

Kamala Harris (D),
until January 20, 2025

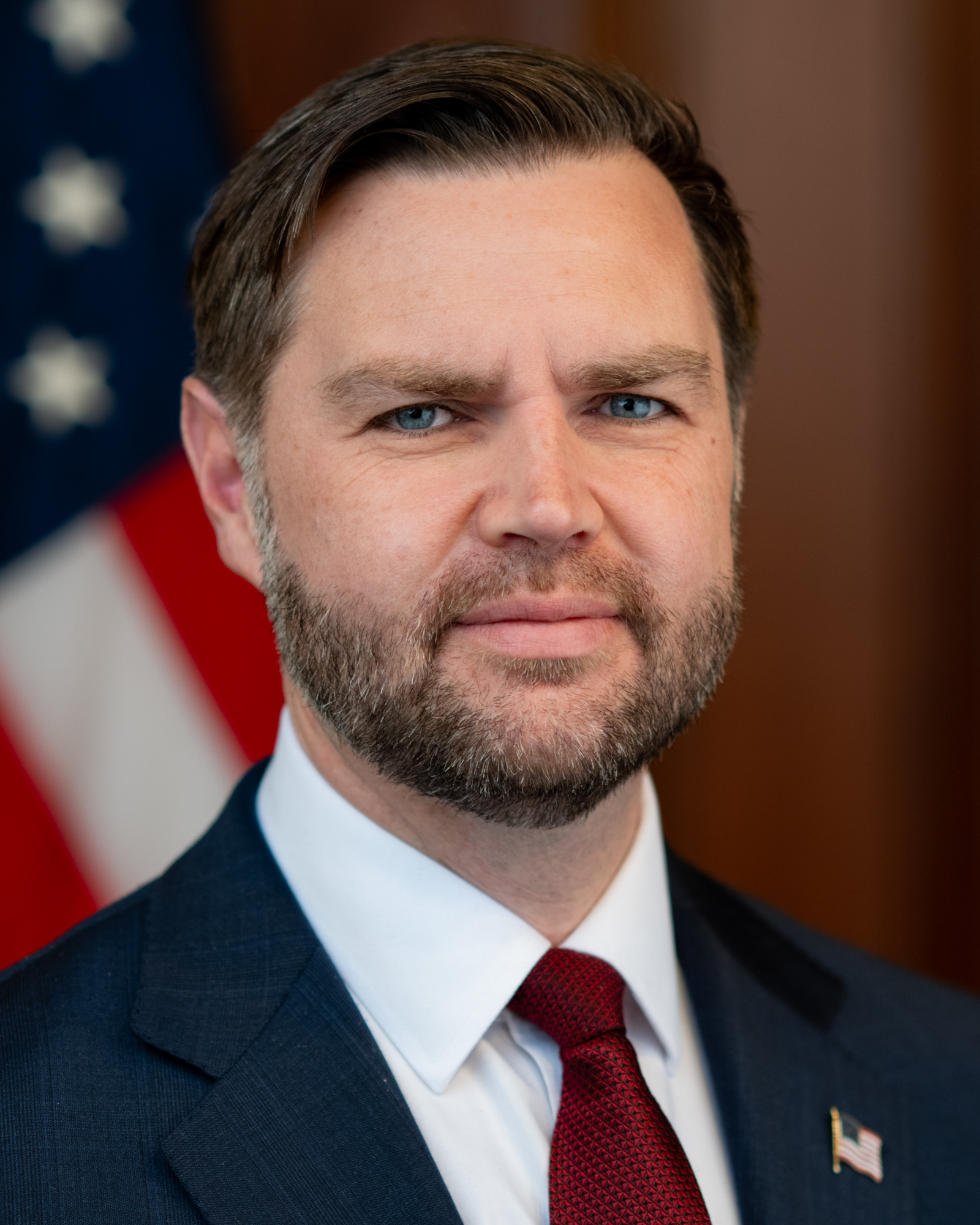
JD Vance (R),
since January 20, 2025

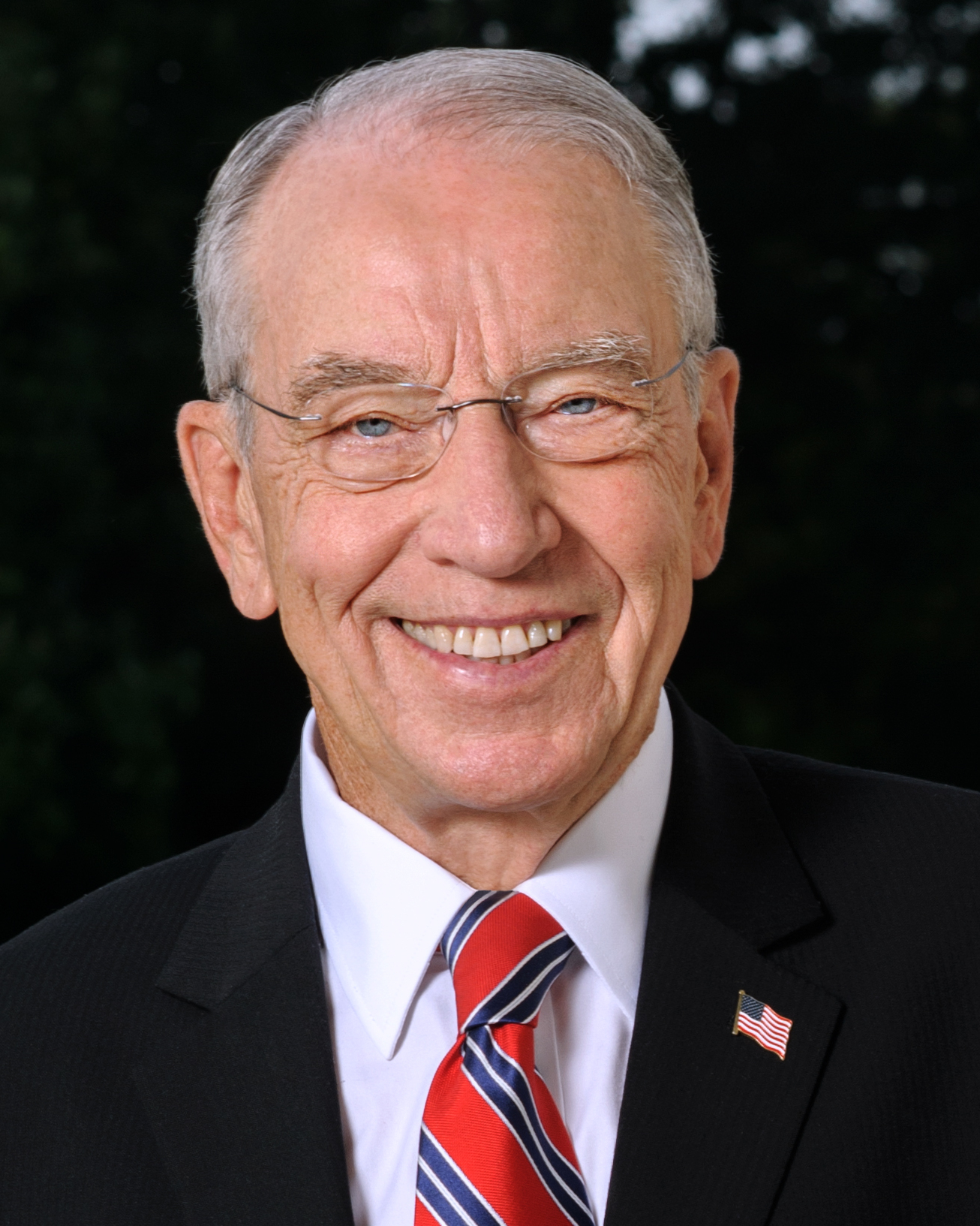
President pro tempore Chuck Grassley (R)

==== Senate presiding officers ====
- President of the Senate:
  - Kamala Harris (D) – until January 20, 2025
  - JD Vance (R) – since January 20, 2025
- President pro tempore: Chuck Grassley (R)

==== Senate majority (Republican) leadership ====
- Majority Leader: John Thune (SD)
  - Counselors: Steve Daines (MT), Markwayne Mullin (OK) (Until March 24, 2026), John Cornyn (TX), and Marsha Blackburn (TN)
- Majority Whip: John Barrasso (WY)
- Chair of the Senate Republican Conference: Tom Cotton (AR)
- Chair of the Senate Republican Policy Committee: Shelley Moore Capito (WV)
- Vice Chair of the Senate Republican Conference: James Lankford (OK)
- Chair of the National Republican Senatorial Committee: Tim Scott (SC)
- Chair of the Senate Republican Steering Committee: Rick Scott (FL)
- Chief Deputy Whip: Mike Crapo (ID)
  - Deputy whips: Jim Banks (IN), Marsha Blackburn (TN), Katie Britt (AL), John Cornyn (TX), Deb Fischer (NE), Markwayne Mullin (OK) (Until March 24, 2026), Dan Sullivan (AK), Thom Tillis (NC), and Todd Young (IN)

==== Senate minority (Democratic) leadership ====
- Minority Leader and Chair of the Senate Democratic Caucus: Chuck Schumer (NY)
- Minority Whip: Dick Durbin (IL)
- Chair of the Senate Democratic Steering and Policy Committee: Amy Klobuchar (MN)
- Chair of the Strategic Communications Committee: Cory Booker (NJ)
- Vice chairs of the Senate Democratic Caucus: Elizabeth Warren (MA) and Mark Warner (VA)
- Chair of the Senate Democratic Outreach Committee: Bernie Sanders (VT)
- Secretary of the Senate Democratic Caucus: Tammy Baldwin (WI)
- Chair of the Democratic Senatorial Campaign Committee: Kirsten Gillibrand (NY)
- Vice Chair of the Senate Democratic Outreach Committee: Catherine Cortez Masto (NV)
- Deputy Secretaries of the Senate Democratic Caucus: Brian Schatz (HI) and Chris Murphy (CT)
- Vice Chair of the Senate Democratic Steering and Policy Committee: Jeanne Shaheen (NH)
- Vice Chair of the Strategic Communications Committee: Tina Smith (MN)
- Chief Deputy Whip: Brian Schatz (HI)
  - Deputy whips: Ben Ray Luján (NM), Jeff Merkley (OR), Jacky Rosen (NV), and Lisa Blunt Rochester (DE)
- President pro tempore Emerita: Patty Murray (WA)

=== House leadership ===
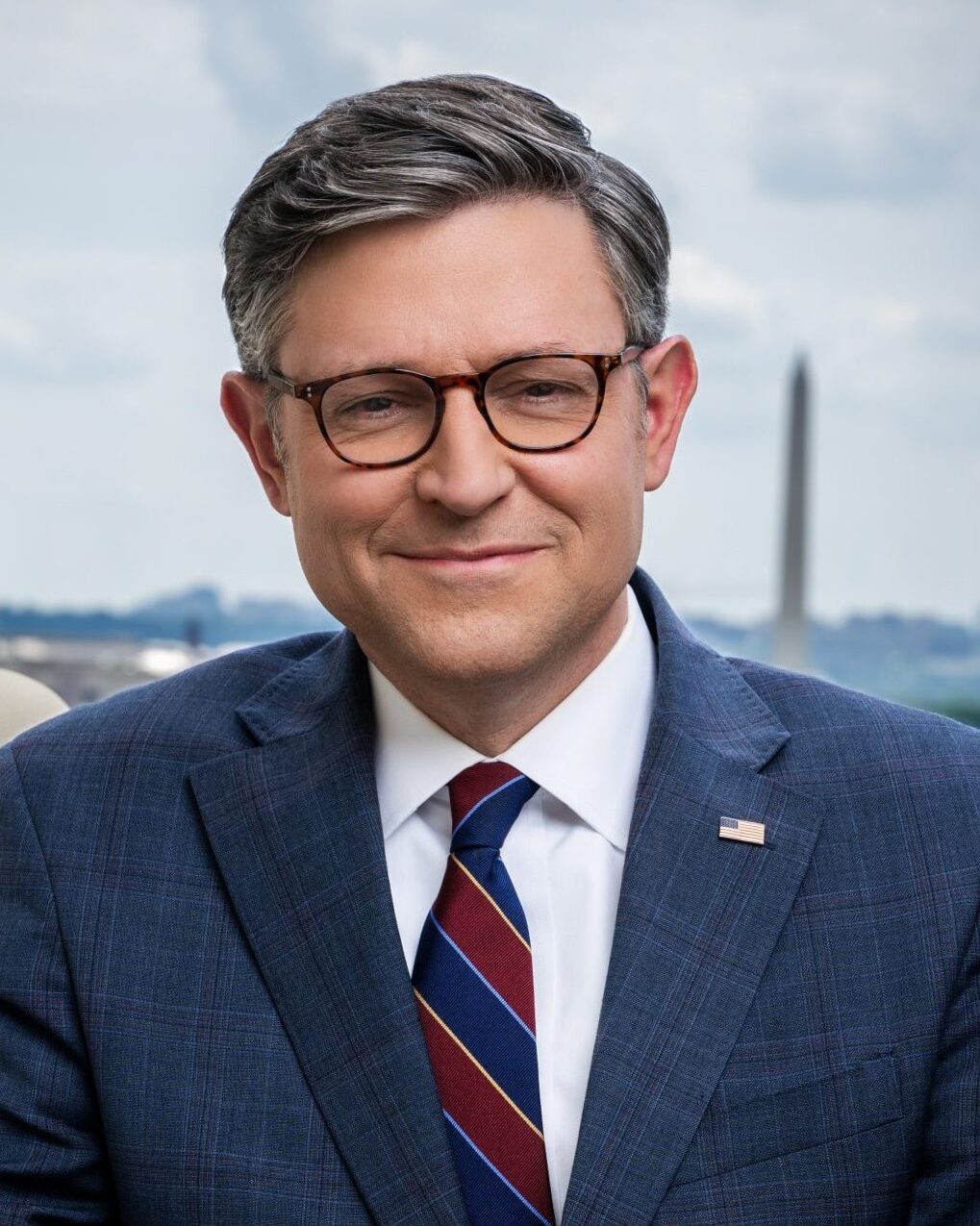
Speaker of the House Mike Johnson (R)

==== House presiding officer ====
- Speaker: (Note: Concurrently serves as the Chair of the House Republican Steering Committee) Mike Johnson (R) (LA 4)

==== House majority (Republican) leadership ====
- Majority Leader: Steve Scalise (LA 1)
- Majority Whip: Tom Emmer (MN 6)
- Chair of the House Republican Conference: Lisa McClain (MI 9)
- Chair of the National Republican Congressional Committee: Richard Hudson (NC 9)
- Chair of the House Republican Policy Committee: Kevin Hern (OK 1) (Until March 11, 2026), Jay Obernolte (CA 23) (After April 15, 2026)
- Vice Chair of the House Republican Conference: Blake Moore (UT 1)
- Secretary of the House Republican Conference: Erin Houchin (IN 9)
- Chair of House Republican Leadership: Elise Stefanik (NY 21)
- Chief Deputy Whip: Guy Reschenthaler (PA 14)
- Sophomore Elected Leadership Committee representative: Russell Fry (SC 7)
- Freshman Elected Leadership Committee representative: Riley Moore (WV 2)

==== House minority (Democratic) leadership ====
- Minority Leader and Chair of the House Democratic Steering and Policy Committee: Hakeem Jeffries (NY 8)
- Minority Whip: Katherine Clark (MA 5)
- Chair of the House Democratic Caucus: Pete Aguilar (CA 33)
- Assistant Democratic Leader: Joe Neguse (CO 2)
- Vice Chair of the House Democratic Caucus: Ted Lieu (CA 36)
- Chair of the Democratic Congressional Campaign Committee: Suzan DelBene (WA 1)
- Chair of the House Democratic Policy and Communications Committee: Debbie Dingell (MI 6)
- Co-chairs of the House Democratic Policy and Communications Committee: Maxwell Frost (FL 10), Lori Trahan (MA 3), and Lauren Underwood (IL 14)
- Junior Caucus Leadership representative: Robert Garcia (CA 42)
- Battleground Leadership representative: Susie Lee (NV 3)
- Freshman Class Leadership representative: Luz Rivas (CA 29)
- Co-chairs of the House Democratic Steering and Policy Committee: Nanette Barragán (CA 44), Robin Kelly (IL 2), and Debbie Wasserman Schultz (FL 25)

== Members ==
Over decades, the age distribution of members of the US Congress has trended toward older individuals.

=== Senators ===
The numbers refer to their Senate classes. All class 1 seats were contested in the November 2024 elections. In this Congress, class 1 means their term commenced in the current Congress, requiring re-election in 2030; class 2 means their term ends with this Congress, requiring re-election in 2026; and class 3 means their term began in the last Congress, requiring re-election in 2028.

==== Alabama ====
▌2. Tommy Tuberville (R)
▌3. Katie Britt (R)

==== Alaska ====
▌2. Dan Sullivan (R)
▌3. Lisa Murkowski (R)

==== Arizona ====
▌1. Ruben Gallego (D)
▌3. Mark Kelly (D)

==== Arkansas ====
▌2. Tom Cotton (R)
▌3. John Boozman (R)

==== California ====
▌1. Adam Schiff (D)
▌3. Alex Padilla (D)

==== Colorado ====
▌2. John Hickenlooper (D)
▌3. Michael Bennet (D)

==== Connecticut ====
▌1. Chris Murphy (D)
▌3. Richard Blumenthal (D)

==== Delaware ====
▌1. Lisa Blunt Rochester (D)
▌2. Chris Coons (D)

==== Florida ====
▌1. Rick Scott (R)
▌3. Marco Rubio (R) (until January 20, 2025)

▌ Ashley Moody (R) (from January 21, 2025)

==== Georgia ====
▌2. Jon Ossoff (D)
▌3. Raphael Warnock (D)

==== Hawaii ====
▌1. Mazie Hirono (D)
▌3. Brian Schatz (D)

==== Idaho ====
▌2. Jim Risch (R)
▌3. Mike Crapo (R)

==== Illinois ====
▌2. Dick Durbin (D)
▌3. Tammy Duckworth (D)

==== Indiana ====
▌1. Jim Banks (R)
▌3. Todd Young (R)

==== Iowa ====
▌2. Joni Ernst (R)
▌3. Chuck Grassley (R)

==== Kansas ====
▌2. Roger Marshall (R)
▌3. Jerry Moran (R)

==== Kentucky ====
▌2. Mitch McConnell (R)
▌3. Rand Paul (R)

==== Louisiana ====
▌2. Bill Cassidy (R)
▌3. John Kennedy (R)

==== Maine ====
▌1. Angus King (I)
▌2. Susan Collins (R)

==== Maryland ====
▌1. Angela Alsobrooks (D)
▌3. Chris Van Hollen (D)

==== Massachusetts ====
▌1. Elizabeth Warren (D)
▌2. Ed Markey (D)

==== Michigan ====
▌1. Elissa Slotkin (D)
▌2. Gary Peters (D)

==== Minnesota ====
▌1. Amy Klobuchar (DFL) (Note: The Minnesota Democratic–Farmer–Labor Party (DFL) is the Minnesota affiliate of the U.S. Democratic Party and its members are considered Democrats.)
▌2. Tina Smith (DFL)

==== Mississippi ====
▌1. Roger Wicker (R)
▌2. Cindy Hyde-Smith (R)

==== Missouri ====
▌1. Josh Hawley (R)
▌3. Eric Schmitt (R)

==== Montana ====
▌1. Tim Sheehy (R)
▌2. Steve Daines (R)

==== Nebraska ====
▌1. Deb Fischer (R)
▌2. Pete Ricketts (R)

==== Nevada ====
▌1. Jacky Rosen (D)
▌3. Catherine Cortez Masto (D)

==== New Hampshire ====
▌2. Jeanne Shaheen (D)
▌3. Maggie Hassan (D)

==== New Jersey ====
▌1. Andy Kim (D)
▌2. Cory Booker (D)

==== New Mexico ====
▌1. Martin Heinrich (D)
▌2. Ben Ray Luján (D)

==== New York ====
▌1. Kirsten Gillibrand (D)
▌3. Chuck Schumer (D)

==== North Carolina ====
▌2. Thom Tillis (R)
▌3. Ted Budd (R)

==== North Dakota ====
▌1. Kevin Cramer (R)
▌3. John Hoeven (R)

==== Ohio ====
▌1. Bernie Moreno (R)
▌3. JD Vance (R) (until January 10, 2025) (Note: In Ohio: JD Vance (R) resigned on January 10, 2025, in anticipation of becoming Vice President of the United States. Jon Husted was sworn in to fill his seat on January 21, 2025.)

▌ Jon Husted (R) (January 21, 2025-December 15, 2026)
▌ Sherrod Brown (D) (from December 15, 2026)

==== Oklahoma ====
▌2. Markwayne Mullin (R) (until March 23, 2026)

▌ Alan Armstrong (R) (from March 24 to November 30, 2026)
▌ Kevin Hern (R) (from November 30, 2026)

▌3. James Lankford (R)

==== Oregon ====
▌2. Jeff Merkley (D)
▌3. Ron Wyden (D)

==== Pennsylvania ====
▌1. David McCormick (R)
▌3. John Fetterman (D)

==== Rhode Island ====
▌1. Sheldon Whitehouse (D)
▌2. Jack Reed (D)

==== South Carolina ====
▌2. Lindsey Graham (R) (until July 11, 2026)

▌ Darline Graham (R) (from July 14, 2026)

▌3. Tim Scott (R)

==== South Dakota ====
▌2. Mike Rounds (R)
▌3. John Thune (R)

==== Tennessee ====
▌1. Marsha Blackburn (R)
▌2. Bill Hagerty (R)

==== Texas ====
▌1. Ted Cruz (R)
▌2. John Cornyn (R)

==== Utah ====
▌1. John Curtis (R)
▌3. Mike Lee (R)

==== Vermont ====
▌1. Bernie Sanders (I)
▌3. Peter Welch (D)

==== Virginia ====
▌1. Tim Kaine (D)
▌2. Mark Warner (D)

==== Washington ====
▌1. Maria Cantwell (D)
▌3. Patty Murray (D)

==== West Virginia ====
▌1. Jim Justice (R) (from January 14, 2025)
▌2. Shelley Moore Capito (R)

==== Wisconsin ====
▌1. Tammy Baldwin (D)
▌3. Ron Johnson (R)

==== Wyoming ====
▌1. John Barrasso (R)
▌2. Cynthia Lummis (R)

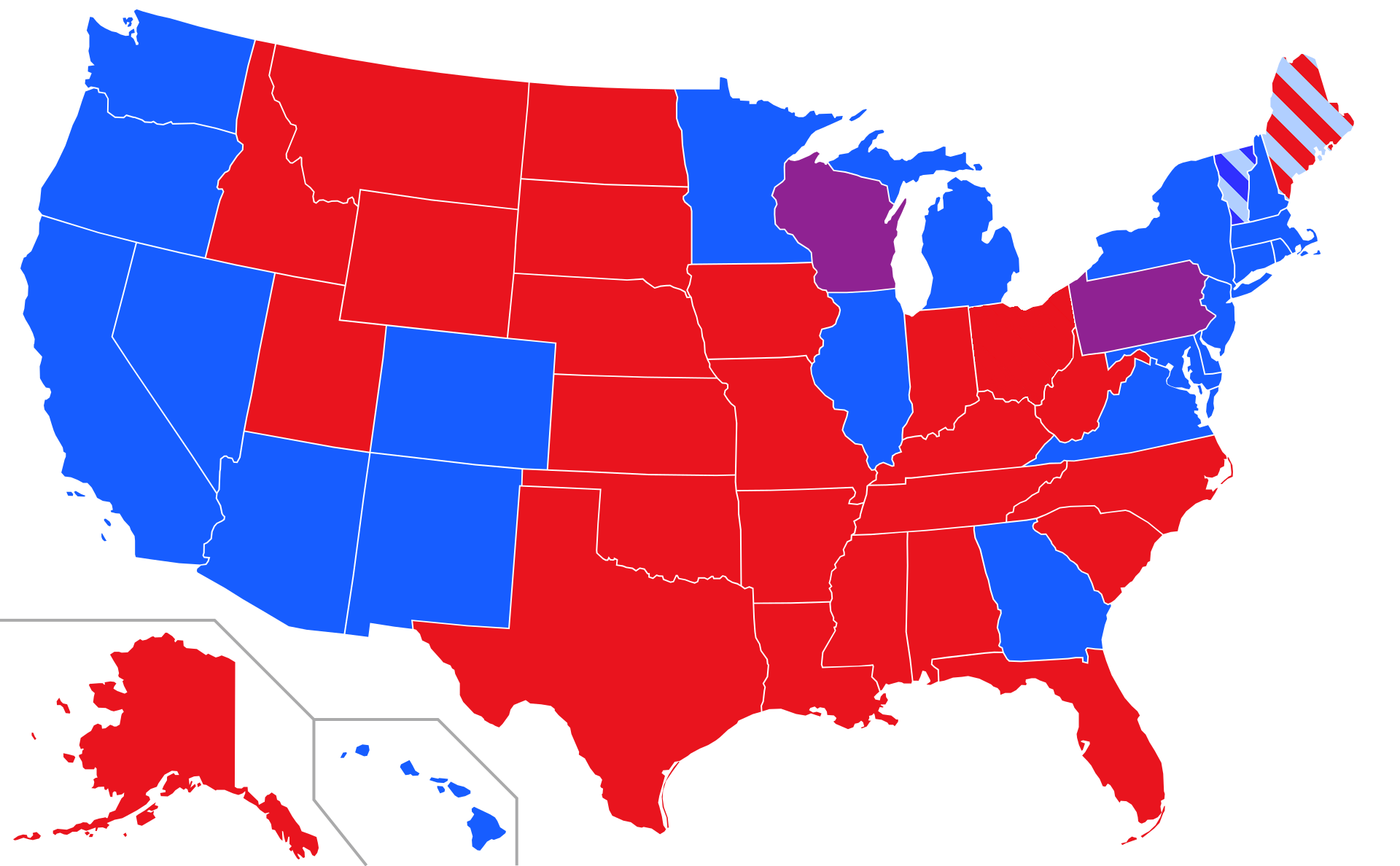
2 Democrats (21 states) 1 Democrat and 1 Independent who caucuses with Democrats (1 state) 1 Democrat and 1 Republican (2 states) 1 Republican and 1 Independent who caucuses with Democrats (1 state) 2 Republicans (25 states)

Senate majority leadership

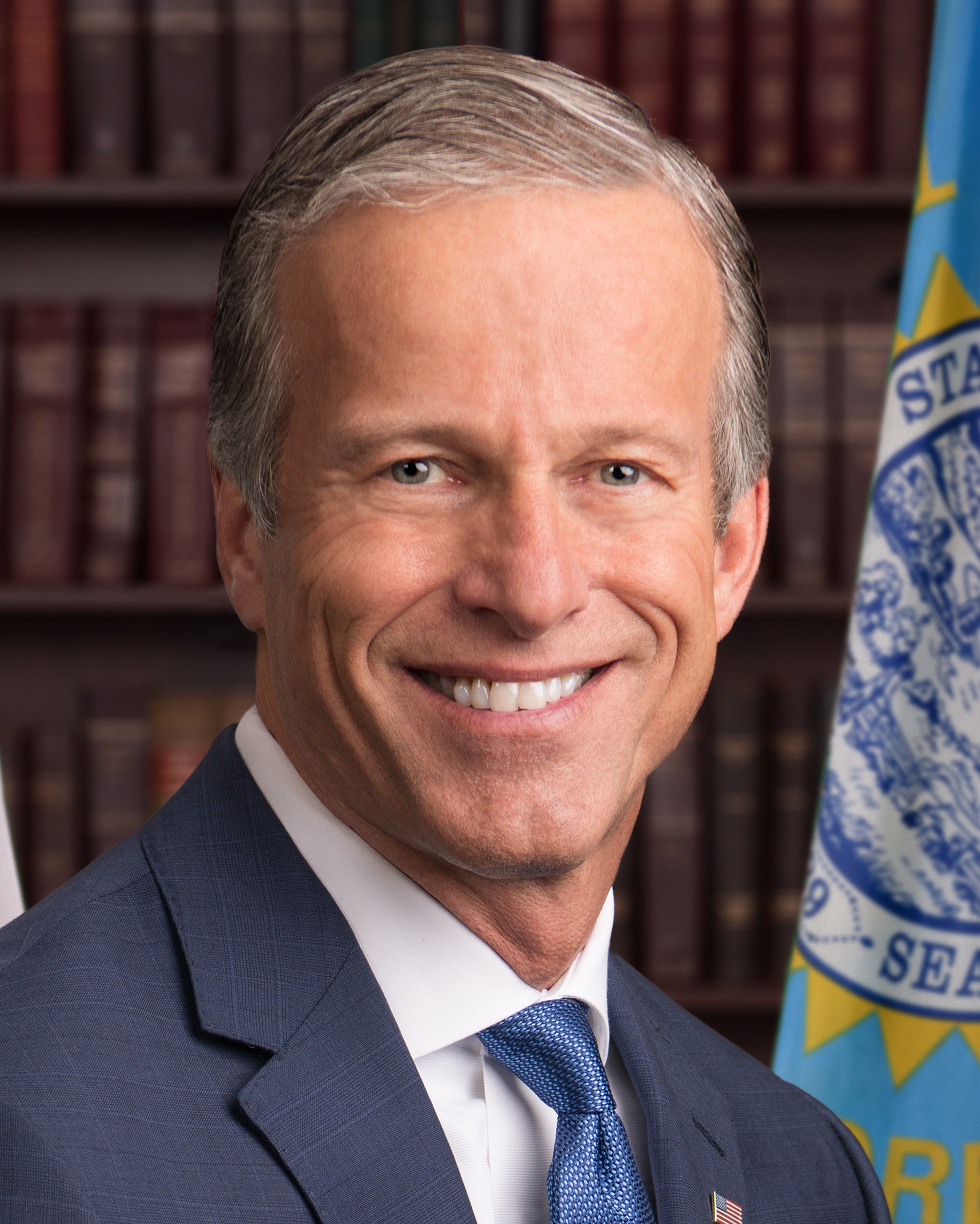
Republican leader
John Thune

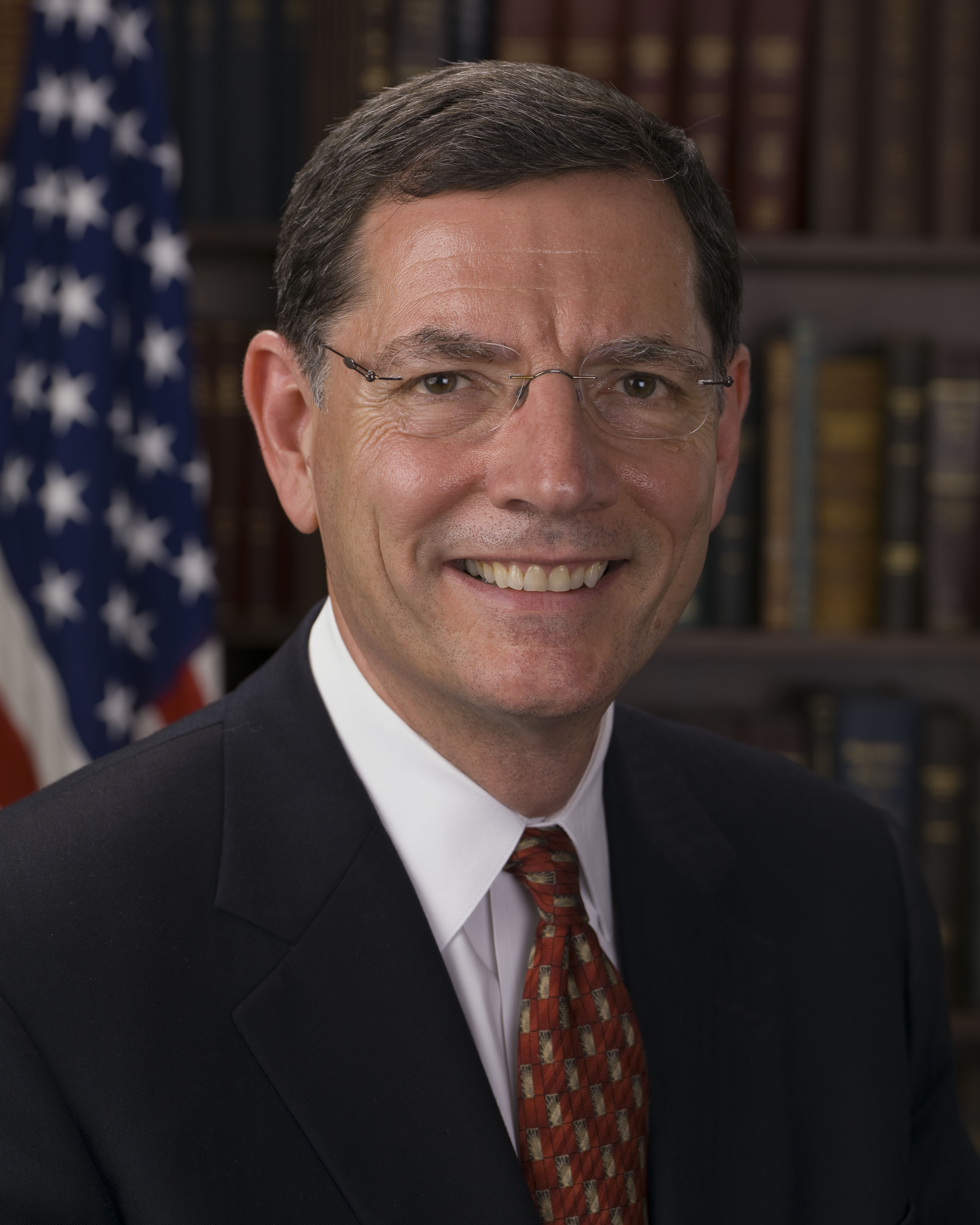
Republican whip
John Barrasso

Senate minority leadership

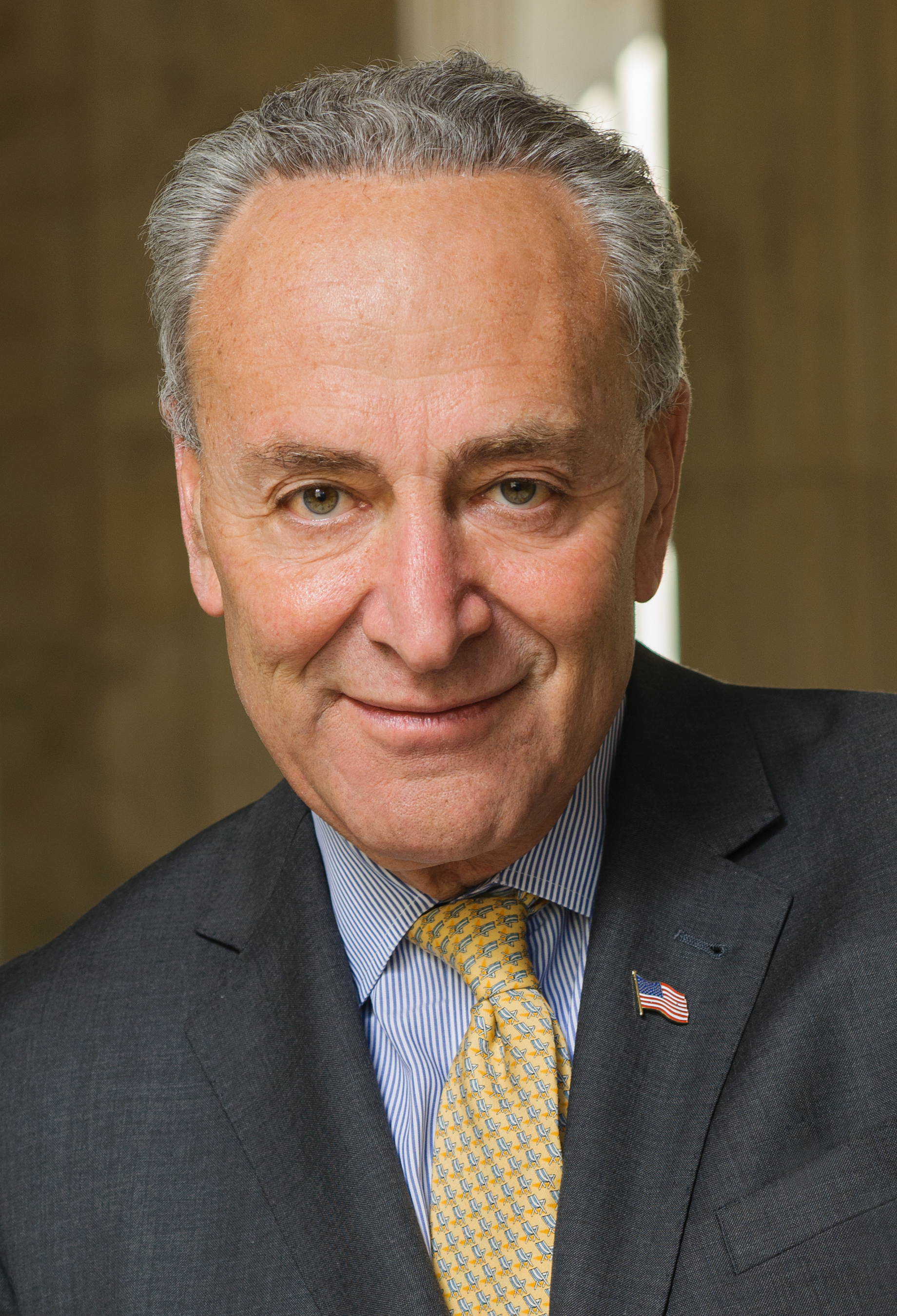
Democratic leader
Chuck Schumer

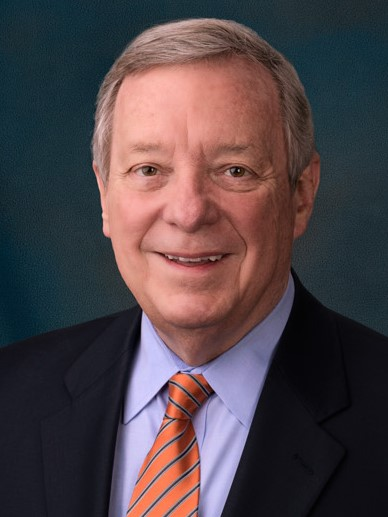
Democratic whip
Dick Durbin

=== Representatives ===
All seats were filled by election in November 2024, or special elections thereafter as noted below.

==== Alabama ====
▌1. Barry Moore (R)
▌2. Shomari Figures (D)
▌3. Mike Rogers (R)
▌4. Robert Aderholt (R)
▌5. Dale Strong (R)
▌6. Gary Palmer (R)
▌7. Terri Sewell (D)

==== Alaska ====
▌At-large. Nick Begich III (R)

==== Arizona ====
▌1. David Schweikert (R)
▌2. Eli Crane (R)
▌3. Yassamin Ansari (D)
▌4. Greg Stanton (D)
▌5. Andy Biggs (R)
▌6. Juan Ciscomani (R)
▌7. Raúl Grijalva (D) (until March 13, 2025)

▌ Adelita Grijalva (D) (from November 12, 2025)

▌8. Abraham Hamadeh (R)
▌9. Paul Gosar (R)

==== Arkansas ====
▌1. Rick Crawford (R)
▌2. French Hill (R)
▌3. Steve Womack (R)
▌4. Bruce Westerman (R)

==== California ====
▌1. Doug LaMalfa (R) (until January 6, 2026)

▌ James Gallagher (R) (from June 10, 2026)

▌2. Jared Huffman (D)
▌▌3. Kevin Kiley (R, then I)
▌4. Mike Thompson (D)
▌5. Tom McClintock (R)
▌6. Ami Bera (D)
▌7. Doris Matsui (D)
▌8. John Garamendi (D)
▌9. Josh Harder (D)
▌10. Mark DeSaulnier (D)
▌11. Nancy Pelosi (D)
▌12. Lateefah Simon (D)
▌13. Adam Gray (D)
▌14. Eric Swalwell (D) (until April 14, 2026)

▌ Aisha Wahab (D) (from September 2, 2026)

▌15. Kevin Mullin (D)
▌16. Sam Liccardo (D)
▌17. Ro Khanna (D)
▌18. Zoe Lofgren (D)
▌19. Jimmy Panetta (D)
▌20. Vince Fong (R)
▌21. Jim Costa (D)
▌22. David Valadao (R)
▌23. Jay Obernolte (R)
▌24. Salud Carbajal (D)
▌25. Raul Ruiz (D)
▌26. Julia Brownley (D)
▌27. George T. Whitesides (D)
▌28. Judy Chu (D)
▌29. Luz Rivas (D)
▌30. Laura Friedman (D)
▌31. Gil Cisneros (D)
▌32. Brad Sherman (D)
▌33. Pete Aguilar (D)
▌34. Jimmy Gomez (D)
▌35. Norma Torres (D)
▌36. Ted Lieu (D)
▌37. Sydney Kamlager-Dove (D)
▌38. Linda Sánchez (D)
▌39. Mark Takano (D)
▌40. Young Kim (R)
▌41. Ken Calvert (R)
▌42. Robert Garcia (D)
▌43. Maxine Waters (D)
▌44. Nanette Barragán (D)
▌45. Derek Tran (D)
▌46. Lou Correa (D)
▌47. Dave Min (D)
▌48. Darrell Issa (R)
▌49. Mike Levin (D)
▌50. Scott Peters (D)
▌51. Sara Jacobs (D)
▌52. Juan Vargas (D)

==== Colorado ====
▌1. Diana DeGette (D)
▌2. Joe Neguse (D)
▌3. Jeff Hurd (R)
▌4. Lauren Boebert (R)
▌5. Jeff Crank (R)
▌6. Jason Crow (D)
▌7. Brittany Pettersen (D)
▌8. Gabe Evans (R)

==== Connecticut ====
▌1. John B. Larson (D)
▌2. Joe Courtney (D)
▌3. Rosa DeLauro (D)
▌4. Jim Himes (D)
▌5. Jahana Hayes (D)

==== Delaware ====
▌At-large. Sarah McBride (D)

==== Florida ====
▌1. Jimmy Patronis (R) (from April 2, 2025)
▌2. Neal Dunn (R)
▌3. Kat Cammack (R)
▌4. Aaron Bean (R)
▌5. John Rutherford (R)
▌6. Mike Waltz (R) (until January 20, 2025)

▌ Randy Fine (R) (from April 2, 2025)

▌7. Cory Mills (R)
▌8. Mike Haridopolos (R)
▌9. Darren Soto (D)
▌10. Maxwell Frost (D)
▌11. Daniel Webster (R)
▌12. Gus Bilirakis (R)
▌13. Anna Paulina Luna (R)
▌14. Kathy Castor (D)
▌15. Laurel Lee (R)
▌16. Vern Buchanan (R)
▌17. Greg Steube (R)
▌18. Scott Franklin (R)
▌19. Byron Donalds (R)
▌20. Sheila Cherfilus-McCormick (D) (until April 21, 2026)

▌ Vacant

▌21. Brian Mast (R)
▌22. Lois Frankel (D)
▌23. Jared Moskowitz (D)
▌24. Frederica Wilson (D)
▌25. Debbie Wasserman Schultz (D)
▌26. Mario Díaz-Balart (R)
▌27. María Elvira Salazar (R)
▌28. Carlos A. Giménez (R)

==== Georgia ====
▌1. Buddy Carter (R)
▌2. Sanford Bishop (D)
▌3. Brian Jack (R)
▌4. Hank Johnson (D)
▌5. Nikema Williams (D)
▌6. Lucy McBath (D)
▌7. Rich McCormick (R)
▌8. Austin Scott (R)
▌9. Andrew Clyde (R)
▌10. Mike Collins (R)
▌11. Barry Loudermilk (R)
▌12. Rick Allen (R)
▌13. David Scott (D) (until April 22, 2026)

▌ Everton Blair (D) (from September 1, 2026)

▌14. Marjorie Taylor Greene (R) (until January 5, 2026)

▌ Clay Fuller (R) (from April 14, 2026)

==== Hawaii ====
▌1. Ed Case (D)
▌2. Jill Tokuda (D)

==== Idaho ====
▌1. Russ Fulcher (R)
▌2. Mike Simpson (R)

==== Illinois ====
▌1. Jonathan Jackson (D)
▌2. Robin Kelly (D)
▌3. Delia Ramirez (D)
▌4. Chuy García (D)
▌5. Mike Quigley (D)
▌6. Sean Casten (D)
▌7. Danny Davis (D)
▌8. Raja Krishnamoorthi (D)
▌9. Jan Schakowsky (D)
▌10. Brad Schneider (D)
▌11. Bill Foster (D)
▌12. Mike Bost (R)
▌13. Nikki Budzinski (D)
▌14. Lauren Underwood (D)
▌15. Mary Miller (R)
▌16. Darin LaHood (R)
▌17. Eric Sorensen (D)

==== Indiana ====
▌1. Frank J. Mrvan (D)
▌2. Rudy Yakym (R)
▌3. Marlin Stutzman (R)
▌4. Jim Baird (R)
▌5. Victoria Spartz (R) (Note: In December 2024, Spartz announced she would not join caucus meetings of the House Republican Conference. She remains a member of the Republican Party.)
▌6. Jefferson Shreve (R)
▌7. André Carson (D)
▌8. Mark Messmer (R)
▌9. Erin Houchin (R)

==== Iowa ====
▌1. Mariannette Miller-Meeks (R)
▌2. Ashley Hinson (R)
▌3. Zach Nunn (R)
▌4. Randy Feenstra (R)

==== Kansas ====
▌1. Tracey Mann (R)
▌2. Derek Schmidt (R)
▌3. Sharice Davids (D)
▌4. Ron Estes (R)

==== Kentucky ====
▌1. James Comer (R)
▌2. Brett Guthrie (R)
▌3. Morgan McGarvey (D)
▌4. Thomas Massie (R)
▌5. Hal Rogers (R)
▌6. Andy Barr (R)

==== Louisiana ====
▌1. Steve Scalise (R)
▌2. Troy Carter (D)
▌3. Clay Higgins (R)
▌4. Mike Johnson (R)
▌5. Julia Letlow (R)
▌6. Cleo Fields (D)

==== Maine ====
▌1. Chellie Pingree (D)
▌2. Jared Golden (D)

==== Maryland ====
▌1. Andy Harris (R)
▌2. Johnny Olszewski (D)
▌3. Sarah Elfreth (D)
▌4. Glenn Ivey (D)
▌5. Steny Hoyer (D)
▌6. April McClain Delaney (D)
▌7. Kweisi Mfume (D)
▌8. Jamie Raskin (D)

==== Massachusetts ====
▌1. Richard Neal (D)
▌2. Jim McGovern (D)
▌3. Lori Trahan (D)
▌4. Jake Auchincloss (D)
▌5. Katherine Clark (D)
▌6. Seth Moulton (D)
▌7. Ayanna Pressley (D)
▌8. Stephen Lynch (D)
▌9. Bill Keating (D)

==== Michigan ====
▌1. Jack Bergman (R)
▌2. John Moolenaar (R)
▌3. Hillary Scholten (D)
▌4. Bill Huizenga (R)
▌5. Tim Walberg (R)
▌6. Debbie Dingell (D)
▌7. Tom Barrett (R)
▌8. Kristen McDonald Rivet (D)
▌9. Lisa McClain (R)
▌10. John James (R)
▌11. Haley Stevens (D)
▌12. Rashida Tlaib (D)
▌13. Shri Thanedar (D)

==== Minnesota ====
▌1. Brad Finstad (R)
▌2. Angie Craig (DFL)
▌3. Kelly Morrison (DFL)
▌4. Betty McCollum (DFL)
▌5. Ilhan Omar (DFL)
▌6. Tom Emmer (R)
▌7. Michelle Fischbach (R)
▌8. Pete Stauber (R)

==== Mississippi ====
▌1. Trent Kelly (R)
▌2. Bennie Thompson (D)
▌3. Michael Guest (R)
▌4. Mike Ezell (R)

==== Missouri ====
▌1. Wesley Bell (D)
▌2. Ann Wagner (R)
▌3. Bob Onder (R)
▌4. Mark Alford (R)
▌5. Emanuel Cleaver (D)
▌6. Sam Graves (R)
▌7. Eric Burlison (R)
▌8. Jason Smith (R)

==== Montana ====
▌1. Ryan Zinke (R)
▌2. Troy Downing (R)

==== Nebraska ====
▌1. Mike Flood (R)
▌2. Don Bacon (R)
▌3. Adrian Smith (R)

==== Nevada ====
▌1. Dina Titus (D)
▌2. Mark Amodei (R)
▌3. Susie Lee (D)
▌4. Steven Horsford (D)

==== New Hampshire ====
▌1. Chris Pappas (D)
▌2. Maggie Goodlander (D)

==== New Jersey ====
▌1. Donald Norcross (D)
▌2. Jeff Van Drew (R)
▌3. Herb Conaway (D)
▌4. Chris Smith (R)
▌5. Josh Gottheimer (D)
▌6. Frank Pallone (D)
▌7. Thomas Kean Jr. (R)
▌8. Rob Menendez (D)
▌9. Nellie Pou (D)
▌10. LaMonica McIver (D)
▌11. Mikie Sherrill (D) (until November 20, 2025)

▌ Analilia Mejia (D) (from April 20, 2026)

▌12. Bonnie Watson Coleman (D)

==== New Mexico ====
▌1. Melanie Stansbury (D)
▌2. Gabe Vasquez (D)
▌3. Teresa Leger Fernandez (D)

==== New York ====
▌1. Nick LaLota (R)
▌2. Andrew Garbarino (R)
▌3. Tom Suozzi (D)
▌4. Laura Gillen (D)
▌5. Gregory Meeks (D)
▌6. Grace Meng (D)
▌7. Nydia Velázquez (D)
▌8. Hakeem Jeffries (D)
▌9. Yvette Clarke (D)
▌10. Dan Goldman (D)
▌11. Nicole Malliotakis (R)
▌12. Jerry Nadler (D)
▌13. Adriano Espaillat (D)
▌14. Alexandria Ocasio-Cortez (D)
▌15. Ritchie Torres (D)
▌16. George Latimer (D)
▌17. Mike Lawler (R)
▌18. Pat Ryan (D)
▌19. Josh Riley (D)
▌20. Paul Tonko (D)
▌21. Elise Stefanik (R)
▌22. John Mannion (D)
▌23. Nick Langworthy (R)
▌24. Claudia Tenney (R)
▌25. Joseph Morelle (D)
▌26. Tim Kennedy (D)

==== North Carolina ====
▌1. Don Davis (D)
▌2. Deborah Ross (D)
▌3. Greg Murphy (R)
▌4. Valerie Foushee (D)
▌5. Virginia Foxx (R)
▌6. Addison McDowell (R)
▌7. David Rouzer (R)
▌8. Mark Harris (R)
▌9. Richard Hudson (R)
▌10. Pat Harrigan (R)
▌11. Chuck Edwards (R)
▌12. Alma Adams (D)
▌13. Brad Knott (R)
▌14. Tim Moore (R)

==== North Dakota ====
▌At-large. Julie Fedorchak (R)

==== Ohio ====
▌1. Greg Landsman (D)
▌2. David Taylor (R)
▌3. Joyce Beatty (D)
▌4. Jim Jordan (R)
▌5. Bob Latta (R)
▌6. Michael Rulli (R)
▌7. Max Miller (R)
▌8. Warren Davidson (R)
▌9. Marcy Kaptur (D)
▌10. Mike Turner (R)
▌11. Shontel Brown (D)
▌12. Troy Balderson (R)
▌13. Emilia Sykes (D)
▌14. David Joyce (R)
▌15. Mike Carey (R)

==== Oklahoma ====
▌1. Kevin Hern (R)
▌2. Josh Brecheen (R)
▌3. Frank Lucas (R)
▌4. Tom Cole (R)
▌5. Stephanie Bice (R)

==== Oregon ====
▌1. Suzanne Bonamici (D)
▌2. Cliff Bentz (R)
▌3. Maxine Dexter (D)
▌4. Val Hoyle (D)
▌5. Janelle Bynum (D)
▌6. Andrea Salinas (D)

==== Pennsylvania ====
▌1. Brian Fitzpatrick (R)
▌2. Brendan Boyle (D)
▌3. Dwight Evans (D)
▌4. Madeleine Dean (D)
▌5. Mary Gay Scanlon (D)
▌6. Chrissy Houlahan (D)
▌7. Ryan Mackenzie (R)
▌8. Rob Bresnahan (R)
▌9. Dan Meuser (R)
▌10. Scott Perry (R)
▌11. Lloyd Smucker (R)
▌12. Summer Lee (D)
▌13. John Joyce (R)
▌14. Guy Reschenthaler (R)
▌15. Glenn Thompson (R)
▌16. Mike Kelly (R)
▌17. Chris Deluzio (D)

==== Rhode Island ====
▌1. Gabe Amo (D)
▌2. Seth Magaziner (D)

==== South Carolina ====
▌1. Nancy Mace (R)
▌2. Joe Wilson (R)
▌3. Sheri Biggs (R)
▌4. William Timmons (R)
▌5. Ralph Norman (R)
▌6. Jim Clyburn (D)
▌7. Russell Fry (R)

==== South Dakota ====
▌At-large. Dusty Johnson (R)

==== Tennessee ====
▌1. Diana Harshbarger (R)
▌2. Tim Burchett (R)
▌3. Chuck Fleischmann (R)
▌4. Scott DesJarlais (R)
▌5. Andy Ogles (R)
▌6. John Rose (R)
▌7. Mark Green (R) (until July 20, 2025)

▌ Matt Van Epps (R) (from December 4, 2025)

▌8. David Kustoff (R)
▌9. Steve Cohen (D)

==== Texas ====
▌1. Nathaniel Moran (R)
▌2. Dan Crenshaw (R)
▌3. Keith Self (R)
▌4. Pat Fallon (R)
▌5. Lance Gooden (R)
▌6. Jake Ellzey (R)
▌7. Lizzie Fletcher (D)
▌8. Morgan Luttrell (R)
▌9. Al Green (D)
▌10. Michael McCaul (R)
▌11. August Pfluger (R)
▌12. Craig Goldman (R)
▌13. Ronny Jackson (R)
▌14. Randy Weber (R)
▌15. Monica De La Cruz (R)
▌16. Veronica Escobar (D)
▌17. Pete Sessions (R)
▌18. Sylvester Turner (D) (until March 5, 2025)

▌ Christian Menefee (D) (from February 2, 2026)

▌19. Jodey Arrington (R)
▌20. Joaquin Castro (D)
▌21. Chip Roy (R)
▌22. Troy Nehls (R)
▌23. Tony Gonzales (R) (until April 14, 2026)

▌ Vacant

▌24. Beth Van Duyne (R)
▌25. Roger Williams (R)
▌26. Brandon Gill (R)
▌27. Michael Cloud (R)
▌28. Henry Cuellar (D)
▌29. Sylvia Garcia (D)
▌30. Jasmine Crockett (D)
▌31. John Carter (R)
▌32. Julie Johnson (D)
▌33. Marc Veasey (D)
▌34. Vicente Gonzalez (D)
▌35. Greg Casar (D)
▌36. Brian Babin (R)
▌37. Lloyd Doggett (D)
▌38. Wesley Hunt (R)

==== Utah ====
▌1. Blake Moore (R)
▌2. Celeste Maloy (R)
▌3. Mike Kennedy (R)
▌4. Burgess Owens (R)

==== Vermont ====
▌At-large. Becca Balint (D)

==== Virginia ====
▌1. Rob Wittman (R)
▌2. Jen Kiggans (R)
▌3. Bobby Scott (D)
▌4. Jennifer McClellan (D)
▌5. John McGuire (R)
▌6. Ben Cline (R)
▌7. Eugene Vindman (D)
▌8. Don Beyer (D)
▌9. Morgan Griffith (R)
▌10. Suhas Subramanyam (D)
▌11. Gerry Connolly (D) (until May 21, 2025)

▌ James Walkinshaw (D) (from September 10, 2025)

==== Washington ====
▌1. Suzan DelBene (D)
▌2. Rick Larsen (D)
▌3. Marie Gluesenkamp Perez (D)
▌4. Dan Newhouse (R)
▌5. Michael Baumgartner (R)
▌6. Emily Randall (D)
▌7. Pramila Jayapal (D)
▌8. Kim Schrier (D)
▌9. Adam Smith (D)
▌10. Marilyn Strickland (D)

==== West Virginia ====
▌1. Carol Miller (R)
▌2. Riley Moore (R)

==== Wisconsin ====
▌1. Bryan Steil (R)
▌2. Mark Pocan (D)
▌3. Derrick Van Orden (R)
▌4. Gwen Moore (D)
▌5. Scott Fitzgerald (R)
▌6. Glenn Grothman (R)
▌7. Tom Tiffany (R)
▌8. Tony Wied (R)

==== Wyoming ====
▌At-large. Harriet Hageman (R)

==== Non-voting members ====
▌American Samoa: Amata Coleman Radewagen (R)
▌District of Columbia: Eleanor Holmes Norton (D)
▌Guam: James Moylan (R)
▌Northern Mariana Islands: Kimberlyn King-Hinds (R)
▌▌Puerto Rico: Pablo Hernández Rivera (PPD/D) (Note: Puerto Rico's non-voting member, the Resident Commissioner, is elected every four years. This is the only member of the House to serve four-year terms.)
▌United States Virgin Islands: Stacey Plaskett (D)

House composition by district Held by Democrats Held by Republicans Held by Independents Vacant

House majority leadership

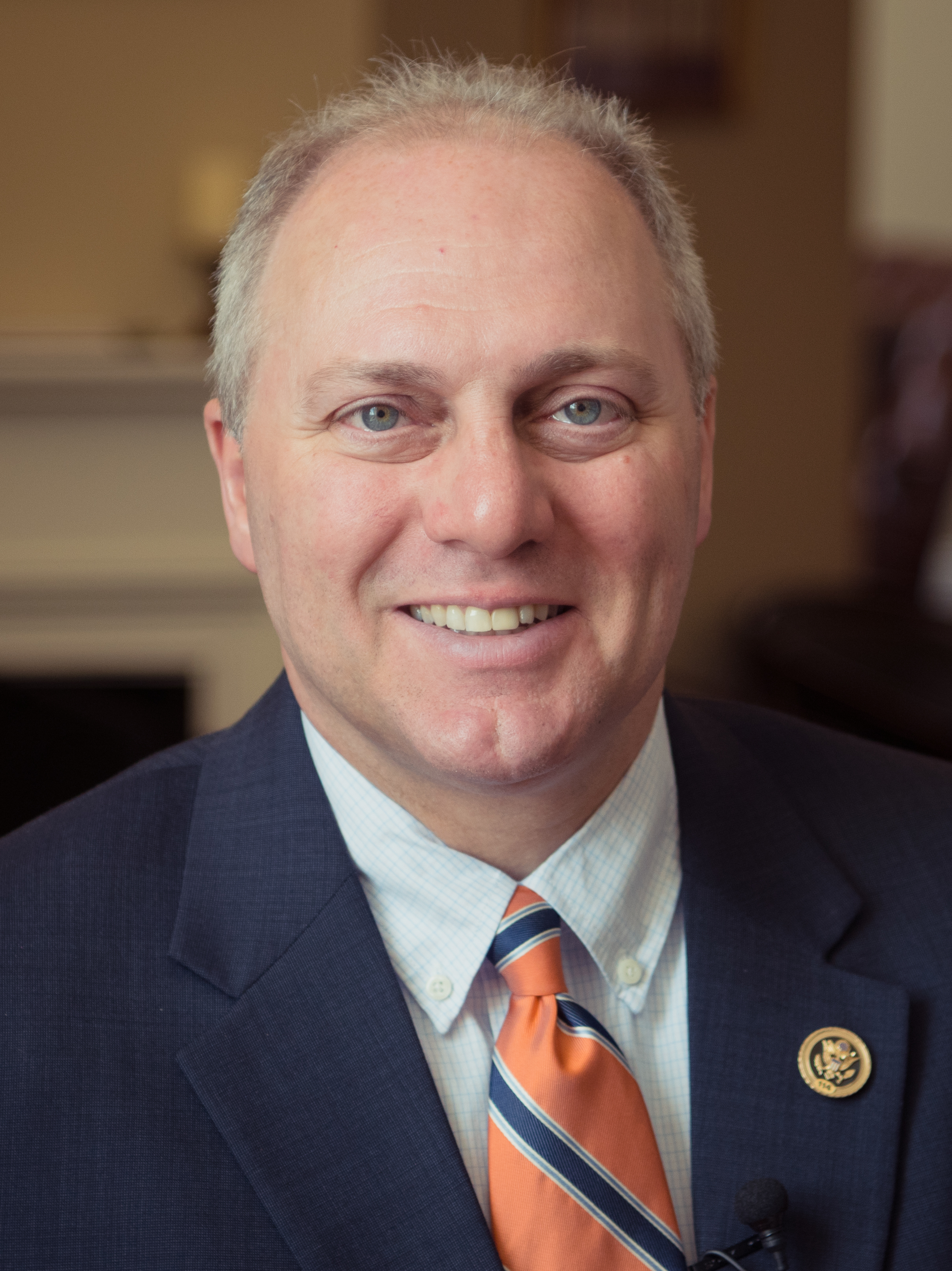
Republican leader
Steve Scalise

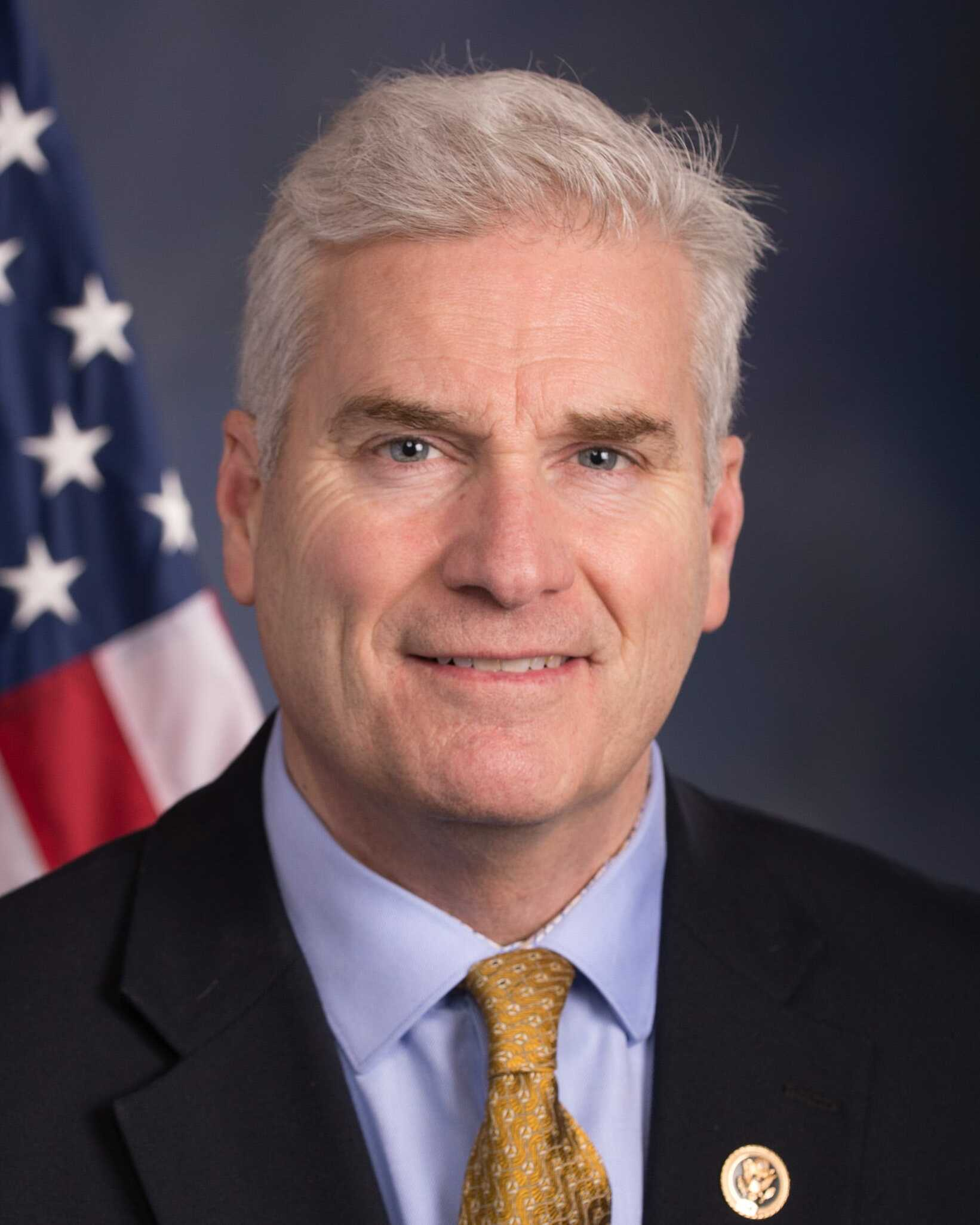
Republican whip
Tom Emmer

House minority leadership

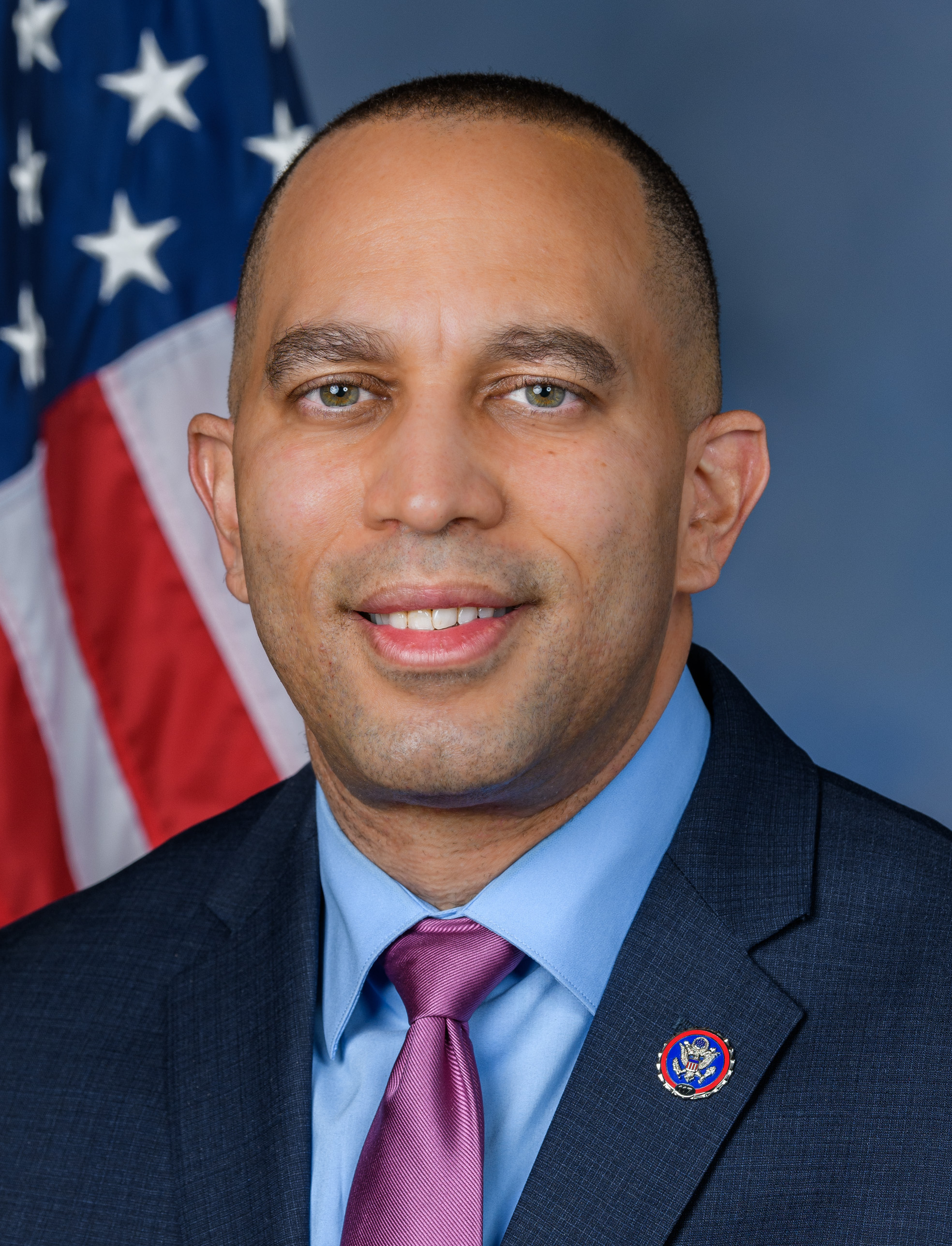
Democratic leader
Hakeem Jeffries

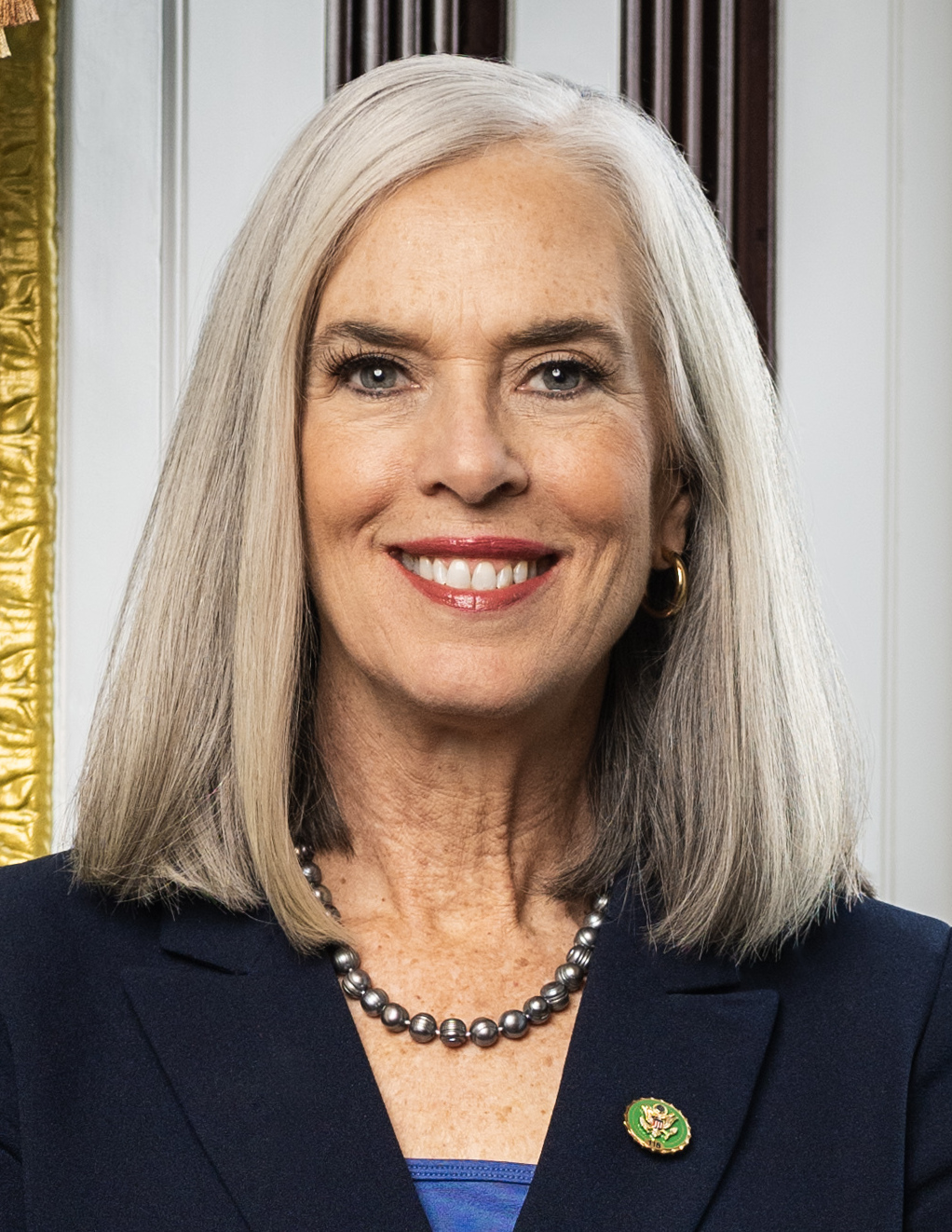
Democratic whip
Katherine Clark

== Changes in membership ==
=== Senate membership changes ===
Senate changes
State (class)	Vacated by	Reason for change	Successor	Date of successor's formal installation (Note: When seated or oath administered, not necessarily when service began.)
West Virginia (1)	Vacant	Senator-elect chose to wait until finishing his term as Governor of West Virginia before taking his seat.	Jim Justice (R)	January 14, 2025
Ohio (3)	JD Vance (R)	Incumbent resigned January 10, 2025, to become Vice President of the United States. Successor was appointed January 18, 2025, to continue the term.	Jon Husted (R)	January 21, 2025
Florida (3)	Marco Rubio (R)	Incumbent resigned January 20, 2025, to become United States Secretary of State. Successor was appointed January 21, 2025, to continue the term. Appointee was later elected to finish the term ending January 3, 2029.	Ashley Moody (R)	January 21, 2025
Oklahoma (2)	Markwayne Mullin (R)	Incumbent resigned March 23, 2026, to become United States Secretary of Homeland Security. Successor was appointed to finish the term.	Alan Armstrong (R)	March 24, 2026
South Carolina (2)	Lindsey Graham (R)	Incumbent died July 11, 2026. Successor was appointed July 14, 2026, to finish the term.	Darline Graham (R)	July 14, 2026
Oklahoma (2)	Alan Armstrong (R)	Appointee resigning early following state law determination. Successor will be appointed November 30, 2026, having already been elected to the next term.	Kevin Hern (R)	November 30, 2026
Ohio (3)	Jon Husted (R)	Appointee lost election to finish the term. Successor elected November 3, 2026, to finish the term ending January 3, 2029.	Sherrod Brown (D)	December 15, 2026

=== House membership changes ===
House changes
District	Vacated by	Reason for change	Successor	Date of successor's formal installation
Florida 1	Vacant	Matt Gaetz (R) resigned November 13, 2024, before the beginning of this Congress, and declined to take office after being re-elected. A special election was held on April 1, 2025.	Jimmy Patronis (R)	April 2, 2025
Florida 6	Mike Waltz (R)	Incumbent resigned January 20, 2025, to become National Security Advisor. A special election was held on April 1, 2025.	Randy Fine (R)	April 2, 2025
Texas 18	Sylvester Turner (D)	Incumbent died March 5, 2025. A special election was held on November 4, 2025, and a runoff was held on January 31, 2026.	Christian Menefee (D)	February 2, 2026
Arizona 7	Raúl Grijalva (D)	Incumbent died March 13, 2025, having already planned to retire at the end of the term. A special election was held on September 23, 2025.	Adelita Grijalva (D)	November 12, 2025
Virginia 11	Gerry Connolly (D)	Incumbent died May 21, 2025, having already planned to retire at the end of the term. A special election was held on September 9, 2025.	James Walkinshaw (D)	September 10, 2025
Tennessee 7	Mark Green (R)	Incumbent resigned July 20, 2025, to take a job in the private sector. A special election was held on December 2, 2025.	Matt Van Epps (R)	December 4, 2025
New Jersey 11	Mikie Sherrill (D)	Incumbent resigned November 20, 2025, after being elected Governor of New Jersey. A special election was held on April 16, 2026.	Analilia Mejia (D)	April 20, 2026
Georgia 14	Marjorie Taylor Greene (R)	Incumbent resigned January 5, 2026, citing her disagreements with President Donald Trump. A special election was held on March 10, 2026, and a runoff was held on April 7.	Clay Fuller (R)	April 14, 2026
California 1	Doug LaMalfa (R)	Incumbent died January 6, 2026. A special election was held on June 2, 2026.	James Gallagher (R)	June 10, 2026
California 3	Kevin Kiley (R)	Incumbent changed parties March 9, 2026.	Kevin Kiley (I)	March 9, 2026
California 14	Eric Swalwell (D)	Incumbent resigned April 14, 2026, following sexual assault allegations. A special election was held on June 16, 2026, and a runoff was held on August 18.	Aisha Wahab (D)	September 2, 2026
Texas 23	Tony Gonzales (R)	Incumbent resigned April 14, 2026, after admitting to an affair.	Vacant until the next Congress	
Florida 20	Sheila Cherfilus-McCormick (D)	Incumbent resigned April 21, 2026, following money laundering allegations.	Vacant until the next Congress	
Georgia 13	David Scott (D)	Incumbent died April 22, 2026. A special election was held on July 28, 2026, and a runoff was held on August 25.	Everton Blair (D)	September 1, 2026
Oklahoma 1	Kevin Hern (R)	Incumbent resigning on November 30, 2026, to succeed appointed senator Alan Armstrong after winning the 2026 election.	Vacant until the next Congress	

== Committees ==
=== Senate committees ===
Committee	Chair	Ranking Member
Aging (Special)	Rick Scott (R-FL)	Kirsten Gillibrand (D-NY)
Agriculture, Nutrition and Forestry	John Boozman (R-AR)	Amy Klobuchar (D-MN)
Appropriations	Susan Collins (R-ME)	Patty Murray (D-WA)
Armed Services	Roger Wicker (R-MS)	Jack Reed (D-RI)
Banking, Housing and Urban Affairs	Tim Scott (R-SC)	Elizabeth Warren (D-MA)
Budget	Lindsey Graham (R-SC) (until July 11, 2026); Ron Johnson (R-WI) (since July 13, 2026)	Jeff Merkley (D-OR)
Commerce, Science and Transportation	Ted Cruz (R-TX)	Maria Cantwell (D-WA)
Energy and Natural Resources	Mike Lee (R-UT)	Martin Heinrich (D-NM)
Environment and Public Works	Shelley Moore Capito (R-WV)	Sheldon Whitehouse (D-RI)
Ethics (Select)	James Lankford (R-OK)	Chris Coons (D-DE)
Finance	Mike Crapo (R-ID)	Ron Wyden (D-OR)
Foreign Relations	Jim Risch (R-ID)	Jeanne Shaheen (D-NH)
Health, Education, Labor and Pensions	Bill Cassidy (R-LA)	Bernie Sanders (I-VT)
Homeland Security and Governmental Affairs	Rand Paul (R-KY)	Gary Peters (D-MI)
Indian Affairs (Permanent Select)	Lisa Murkowski (R-AK)	Brian Schatz (D-HI)
Intelligence (Select)	Tom Cotton (R-AR)	Mark Warner (D-VA)
International Narcotics Control (Permanent Caucus)	John Cornyn (R-TX)	Sheldon Whitehouse (D-RI)
Judiciary	Chuck Grassley (R-IA)	Dick Durbin (D-IL)
Rules and Administration	Mitch McConnell (R-KY)	Alex Padilla (D-CA)
Small Business and Entrepreneurship	Joni Ernst (R-IA)	Ed Markey (D-MA)
Veterans' Affairs	Jerry Moran (R-KS)	Richard Blumenthal (D-CT)

=== House committees ===
Committee	Chair	Ranking Member
Agriculture	Glenn Thompson (R-PA)	Angie Craig (D-MN)
Appropriations	Tom Cole (R-OK)	Rosa DeLauro (D-CT)
Armed Services	Mike Rogers (R-AL)	Adam Smith (D-WA)
Budget	Jodey Arrington (R-TX)	Brendan Boyle (D-PA)
Education and Workforce	Tim Walberg (R-MI)	Bobby Scott (D-VA)
Energy and Commerce	Brett Guthrie (R-KY)	Frank Pallone (D-NJ)
Ethics	Michael Guest (R-MS)	Mark DeSaulnier (D-CA)
Financial Services	French Hill (R-AR)	Maxine Waters (D-CA)
Foreign Affairs	Brian Mast (R-FL)	Gregory Meeks (D-NY)
Homeland Security	Mark Green (R-TN) (until July 18, 2025); Andrew Garbarino (R-NY) (since July 21, 2025)	Bennie Thompson (D-MS)
House Administration	Bryan Steil (R-WI)	Joe Morelle (D-NY)
Intelligence (Permanent Select)	Rick Crawford (R-AR)	Jim Himes (D-CT)
Judiciary	Jim Jordan (R-OH)	Jamie Raskin (D-MD)
Natural Resources	Bruce Westerman (R-AR)	Jared Huffman (D-CA)
Oversight and Government Reform	James Comer (R-KY)	Gerry Connolly (D-VA) (until April 28, 2025); Robert Garcia (D-CA) (since June 24, 2025)
Rules	Virginia Foxx (R-NC)	Jim McGovern (D-MA)
Science, Space and Technology	Brian Babin (R-TX)	Zoe Lofgren (D-CA)
Small Business	Roger Williams (R-TX)	Nydia Velázquez (D-NY)
Strategic Competition between the United States and the Chinese Communist Party (Select)	John Moolenaar (R-MI)	Raja Krishnamoorthi (D-IL)
Transportation and Infrastructure	Sam Graves (R-MO)	Rick Larsen (D-WA)
Veterans' Affairs	Mike Bost (R-IL)	Mark Takano (D-CA)
Ways and Means	Jason Smith (R-MO)	Richard Neal (D-MA)

=== Joint committees ===
Committee	Chair	Vice Chair	Ranking Member	Vice Ranking Member
Economic	Rep. David Schweikert (R-AZ)	Sen. Eric Schmitt (R-MO)	Sen. Maggie Hassan (D-NH)	Rep. Don Beyer (D-VA)
Inaugural Ceremonies (Special); Until January 20, 2025	Sen. Amy Klobuchar (D-MN)	Rep. Mike Johnson (R-LA)	Rep. Hakeem Jeffries (D-NY)	Sen. Deb Fischer (R-NE)
Library	Rep. Bryan Steil (R-WI)	Sen. Mitch McConnell (R-KY)	Sen. Alex Padilla (D-CA)	Rep. Joe Morelle (D-NY)
Printing	Sen. Mitch McConnell (R-KY)	Rep. Bryan Steil (R-WI)	Rep. Joe Morelle (D-NY)	Sen. Alex Padilla (D-CA)
Taxation (Note: The Joint Taxation Committee leadership rotate the chair and vice chair and the ranking members between the House and Senate at the start of each session in the middle of the congressional term. The first session leadership is shown here.)	Rep. Jason Smith (R-MO)	Sen. Mike Crapo (R-ID)	Sen. Ron Wyden (D-OR)	Rep. Richard Neal (D-MA)

== Senior staff ==
Officers

- Architect of the Capitol: Thomas Austin
- Attending Physician: Brian P. Monahan

Organizations

- Capitol Police: Michael G. Sullivan
- Congressional Budget Office: Phillip Swagel
- Government Accountability Office: Orice Williams Brown (acting)
- Government Printing Office: Hugh Halpern
- Library of Congress: Robert Newlen (acting)
  Todd Blanche (acting)
  - Congressional Research Service: Karen Donfried
  - Copyright Office: Vacant
  - Federal Research Division: Annie Rorem
  - Law Library of Congress: Aslihan Bulut

=== Senate senior staff ===
Officers

- Secretary: Jackie Barber
- Sergeant at Arms and Doorkeeper: Jennifer Hemingway
- Parliamentarian: Elizabeth MacDonough
- Party Secretary for the Majority: Robert Duncan (R)
- Party Secretary for the Minority: Gary B. Myrick (D)
- Chaplain: Barry Black

Officials

- Curator: Melinda Smith
- Historian: Katherine Scott
- Librarian: Meghan Dunn

=== House senior staff ===
Officers

- Chaplain: Margaret G. Kibben
- Chief Administrative Officer: Anne Binsted (acting)
- Clerk: Kevin McCumber
- Sergeant at Arms: William McFarland

Officials

- General Counsel: Matthew Berry
- Historian: Matthew Wasniewski
- Inspector General: Christen J. Stevenson
- Parliamentarian: Jason Smith
- Reading Clerks: Susan Cole (R) and Tylease Alli (D)

Organizations

- Office of Congressional Conduct: Omar Ashmawy
- Office of Interparliamentary Affairs: Kate Knudson
- Office of the Law Revision Counsel: Ralph Seep
- Office of the Legislative Counsel: Warren Burke
- Office of the Whistleblower Ombuds: Shanna Devine
- Office of Congressional Workplace Rights: Martin Crane

== Elections ==
- 2024 United States elections (elections leading to this Congress)
  - 2024 United States Senate elections
  - 2024 United States House of Representatives elections
- 2025 United States House of Representatives elections
- 2026 United States elections (elections during this Congress, leading to the next Congress)
  - 2026 United States Senate elections
  - 2026 United States House of Representatives elections
