= Protect College Sports Act =

Proposed college sports regulation bill

Protect College Sports Act of 2026
- Long title: To protect the name, image, and likeness rights of, and provide protections for, student athletes and to promote fair competition among intercollegiate athletics, and for other purposes.
- Announced in: the 119th United States Congress
- Number of co-sponsors: 9

Codification
- Acts amended: Sports Agent Responsibility and Trust Act

Legislative history
- Introduced in the Senate as S. 4668 by Ted Cruz (R–TX) on June 2, 2026; Passed the Senate with amendments on September 28, 2026 (77–22)

The Protect College Sports Act of 2026 (S. 4668) is a bipartisan bill introduced by United States Senate Committee on Commerce, Science, and Transportation chairperson and ranking member Senators Ted Cruz and Maria Cantwell.

== Summary of S. 4668 ==
The main goal of S. 4668 is to regulate college sports, especially the usage of players' name, image, and likeness (NIL) and transfers. The bill will require reporting of all NIL earnings greater than $600. The bill would also put caps on NIL and penalties for exceeding the cap. The bill will only allow one transfer without penalty and will establish that they only have eligibility for at most five years from the day they start as a collegiate student athlete.

== History ==
=== Introduction ===
Senators Cruz and Cantwell introduced S. 4668 on June 2, 2026 as a bipartisan bill to regulate college sports. The bill has five Democratic cosponsors and four Republican cosponsors.

=== Senate ===
The Senate Committee on Commerce, Science, and Transportation ordered S. 4668 reported to the full Senate chamber on June 18, 2026. On September 15, 2026 the Senate voted 74-24 to invoke cloture with a final vote on passage anticipated for sometime in September, 2026. On September 28, 2026 at 9:42 PM the Senate passed S. 4668 77-22 sending the bill to the United States House of Representatives.

== Reactions ==
=== Executive Branch ===
President Trump has stated that he is fully in support of the Protect College Sports Act and has stated it as a priority to pass. President Trump has also stated that he will sign the bill as soon as it reaches his desk.
