= H.R. 10204 (6028) Legislative Branch Agencies Clarification Act =

H.R. 6028 is a bill in the 119th United States Congress with the title being Legislative Branch Agencies Clarification Act. Its sponsor is Rep. Morgan Griffith, who introduced the bill on November 12, 2025. H.R. 6028 was reintroduced on September 1, 2026 as H.R. 10204, a corrected bill.

== History ==
=== Creation ===
Rep. Griffith introduced this bill on November 12, 2025. He did this to prevent future executive branch interference in legislative agencies. Rep. Griffith has said that this bill is to prevent future dispute over who holds the position of Librarian of Congress.

=== House of Representatives ===
H.R. 6028 was originally referred to the Committee on House Administration. The committee sent the bill as amended to the full House on June 8, 2026. On that same day the House passed the bill by voice vote and sent the bill to the Senate. H.R. 10204 (the newer clean bill) passed the house on September 14, 2026 and was sent to the Senate.

=== Senate ===
H.R. 6028 was received in the Senate on June 9, 2026.
