= United States House of Representatives Office of Interparliamentary Affairs =

Office of the U.S. House of Representatives

The Office of Interparliamentary Affairs is an office of the United States House of Representatives that is responsible for working with "parliamentarians, officers, or employees of foreign legislative bodies" to organize official visits to the House of Representatives.

Created in 2003 by the Legislative Branch Appropriations Act, 2004, the Office is headed by a Director, appointed by the Speaker of the House of Representatives. They serve for as long as they are sanctioned by the Speaker and, with the approval of the Speaker, they may appoint other employees necessary to carry out the functions of the Office.

Directors of Interparliamentary Affairs:

- Martha C. Morrison 2003 - ?
- Kay A. King 2007 - 2010
- Stacee Bako 2010 - 2011
- Janice C. Robinson 2011 - 2014

Specific duties of the Office include:

- To receive and respond to inquiries from foreign parliamentarians or foreign legislative bodies regarding official visits to the House of Representatives.
- To coordinate official visits to the House of Representatives by parliamentarians, officers, or employees of foreign legislative bodies.
- To coordinate with the House Sergeant-at-Arms, the Clerk, and other officers of the House of Representatives in providing services for delegations of Members on official visits to foreign nations.
- To carry out other activities to—
  - discharge and coordinate the activities and responsibilities of the House of Representatives in connection with participation in various interparliamentary exchanges and organizations;
  - facilitate the interchange and reception in the United States of members of foreign legislative bodies and permanent officials of foreign governments; and
  - enable the House to host meetings with senior government officials and other dignitaries in order to discuss matters relevant to United States relations with other nations.
