= Jewish American Security Act =

2026 proposed Act of Congress

United States Congress
- Considered by: United States Congress
- Introduced by: Senator James Lankford (R–OK); Senator Jacky Rosen (D-NV)
- Introduced: May 19, 2026
- Status: Pending

The Jewish American Security Act is a proposed Act of Congress introduced by Senators Jacky Rosen and James Lankford, that aims to protect American Jews and Jewish institutions from antisemitism. Rosen and Lankford, co-founders and co-chairs of the Senate Bipartisan Task Force for Combating Antisemitism.

== Background ==
Previous legislation to address antisemitism in the US includes the Antisemitism Response and Prevention Act and the Antisemitism Awareness Act.

== Provisions ==
The bill would require the Department of Education to create a comprehensive Title VI framework to address antisemitism on college campuses, allocate $1 billion to houses of worship and non-profits for security resources, and create accountability for how social media platforms address antisemitism.

== Legislative history ==
The bill was introduced on May 19, 2026. A companion bill is expected to be introduced in the House of Representatives.

On June 11, 2026, companion legislation was introduced in the House of Representatives by Representatives Dan Goldman and Mike Lawler.

== Reaction ==
The bill was supported by the American Jewish Committee, Jewish Council for Public Affairs, The Nexus Project, and the Anti-Defamation League, along with Reform and Orthodox organizations.
