= Parents Decide Act =

2026 proposed US age verification law

- Long title: To require operating system providers to verify the age of any user of an operating system, and for other purposes.

Legislative history
- Introduced in the House of Representatives as H.R. 8250 by Josh Gottheimer (D-NJ) on April 13, 2026; Committee consideration by House Committee on Energy and Commerce

The Parents Decide Act (H.R. 8250) is a proposed United States federal law that would require the developers of operating systems to verify the ages of users when setting up or regularly using a device. The act also allows parents to verify the creation of accounts under 18 years old. Other devices such as smartphones, computers, gaming consoles, TVs, and other computing devices would also require mandated age verification.

The bill has garnered controversy for accusations of imposing mass surveillance, the placing of sensitive government info into vulnerable intermediaries, the wide scope of devices affected, and the open-ended possibility of banning open source operating systems such as Linux.

== Background ==
The bill seeks to address the issue of children's access to certain material deemed harmful online. Sponsors of the bill argue the need to impose parental control features in "social media, apps, and AI platforms" to combat the inappropriate content children could access on these platforms.

The bill was first announced on April 2, 2026 by Josh Gottheimer [D-NY], and formally introduced into the 119th United States Congress on April 13. Gottheimer in his press release for the bill cited cases such as the suicide of Mason Edens after being shown and liking dozens of graphic videos relating to depression and suicide, some promoting the method he used. Mason's mother, Jennie DeSerio, said “I completely believe in my heart that Mason would be alive today had he not seen those TikTok videos”. Another case for the bill is cited where prior to his suicide, ChatGPT had discouraged a 16 year-old boy to seek help for suicidal ideation and to help write his suicide note.

The bill was introduced amidst several other jurisdictions pushing for similar parental control bills such as the California Digital Age Assurance Act and Colorado's Age Attestation on Computing Devices.

== Text ==
It would require that operating system provider (defined as "a person that develops, licenses, or controls the operating system on a computer, mobile device, or any other general purpose computing device") "verify" the age of users upon creating an account and during use. The bill also allows parents or legal guardians to verify the age of users under 18 in a manner not specified by the bill. Every operating system provider must also create a system for any "app developer" to access any information necessary for verifying the user's date of birth.

It is unclear how this bill would require age verification to be done or prove that an individual is the parent, but many anticipate that this would be done by intermediary verification services which would process the users' government ID. It does not require members of Congress to lay out this info before passing the law, but have the Federal Trade Commission decide on the details later.

The text of the bill gives 180 days after its enactment for the FTC to determine rules to carry out the details of the bill. The bill goes into effect one year after its enactment.

== Legislative History ==
The bill was drafted and introduced by Rep. Josh Gottheimer [D-NY] and referred to the House Committee on Energy and Commerce on April 13, 2026. The bill was initially cosponsored by Rep. Elise Stefanik [R-NY], and was joined by Rep. Brian Fitzpatrick [R-PA] on the 22nd.

== Opposition ==
The bill has been criticized for many aspects, most of which pertain to issues of surveillance and its use of private verification companies. Opponents of the act ranging from both conservative and liberal viewpoints express concern over government overreach, security risks, and a breach of privacy and free speech. Partisan concerns arose as the details of the regulation is dictated by the Federal Trade Commission by a small group of commissioners that are unelected and chosen by the President of the United States. Detractors have referred to the bill as unusually broad in scope.

=== Surveillance & Processing of Government ID ===
Many critics have mentioned that although the bill does not specify how exactly the user's birthday would be verified, it would very likely be via government ID processed by private intermediate verification services. They argue the likelihood of data breaches, pointing to the quick failure of Discord's ID verification efforts which led to the data leak of 70,000 users' government ID and biometric data.

=== Wide Scope & Unintended Outcomes of Bill ===
The bill is also criticized for applying identity verification seemingly to every operating system without any specific carve-out. Critics argue that the bill's language is murky and doesn't define what a "general purpose computing device" is. Many point out that devices as simple as "E-Readers" and "Raspberry Pis for your garage door opener" would be required to somehow be ID-verified.

The vagueness of the bill also creates concerns over OS developers being required to share the data they receive to third-party companies. It is unsure whether operating systems like Linux would also essentially become banned throughout the US, with some critics citing the inability of open-source developers to create and maintain a secure ID processing framework that works with every application.

== See also ==
- California Digital Age Assurance Act
