= 2026 Antisemitism Resolution (119th Congress) =

Proposed United States law

United States Congress
- Long title: Resolution condemning antisemitic hate-filled rhetoric and content disseminated by prominent online personalities, and urging social media platforms and public leaders to denounce and address such conduct.
- Considered by: United States House of Representatives
- Introduced by: Representatives Josh Gottheimer (D-NJ) and Mike Lawler (R-NY)
- Introduced: April 29, 2026
- Status: Not passed

In April 2026, Congressmen Josh Gottheimer and Mike Lawler introduced a resolution in the United States House of Representatives condemning alleged antisemitism spread by Internet personalities. The resolution names several prominent American internet personalities, including Hasan Piker and Candace Owens.

== Provisions ==
The resolution resolves that:

(1) antisemitic rhetoric and conspiracy theories disseminated by influential online personalities, including Hasan Piker and Candace Owens, are dangerous and contribute to a climate of hatred and intolerance;

(2) individuals with online platforms have a responsibility to refrain from promoting or amplifying antisemitic narratives and disinformation;

(3) social media and streaming platforms should take appropriate steps to enforce their policies against hate speech and prevent the spread of antisemitic content;

(4) public officials and community leaders should unequivocally condemn antisemitism, including when it is propagated by high-profile media figures and influencers;

(5) efforts to downplay or excuse antisemitic rhetoric under the guise of political commentary should be rejected; and

(6) the United States reaffirms its commitment to combating antisemitism, and ensuring the safety and dignity of Jewish individuals and communities both online and offline.

== Legislative history ==
The resolution was introduced on April 29, 2026.

== Reaction ==
Piker condemned the resolution, saying that the congressmen are "once again conflating legitimate critics of Israel with actual antisemites," adding that they were "making antisemitism worse".

The New Republic wrote that "a symbolic resolution attacking two influencers can hardly be seen as a bipartisan priority for Congress."
