= 2026 United States House of Representatives elections in Oklahoma =

- November 3, 2026

All 5 Oklahoma seats to the United States House of Representatives
	Majority party	Minority party
Party	Republican	Democratic
Last election	5	0
Seats won	5	0
Seat change	Steady	Steady
Popular vote	644,286	454,743
Percentage	57.63%	40.67%
Swing	▼7.46%	▲9.65%

Republican
40–50%
50–60%
60–70%
70–80%
80–90%
Democratic
50–60%

The 2026 United States House of Representatives elections in Oklahoma were held on November 3, 2026, to elect the five U.S. representatives from the State of Oklahoma, one from each of the state's congressional districts. The elections coincided with other elections to the House of Representatives, elections to the United States Senate, and various state and local elections. The primary elections took place on June 16, 2026, and in races where no candidate receives over 50% of the vote, runoff elections would have taken place on August 25, 2026.

== District 1 ==
2026 Oklahoma's 1st congressional district election
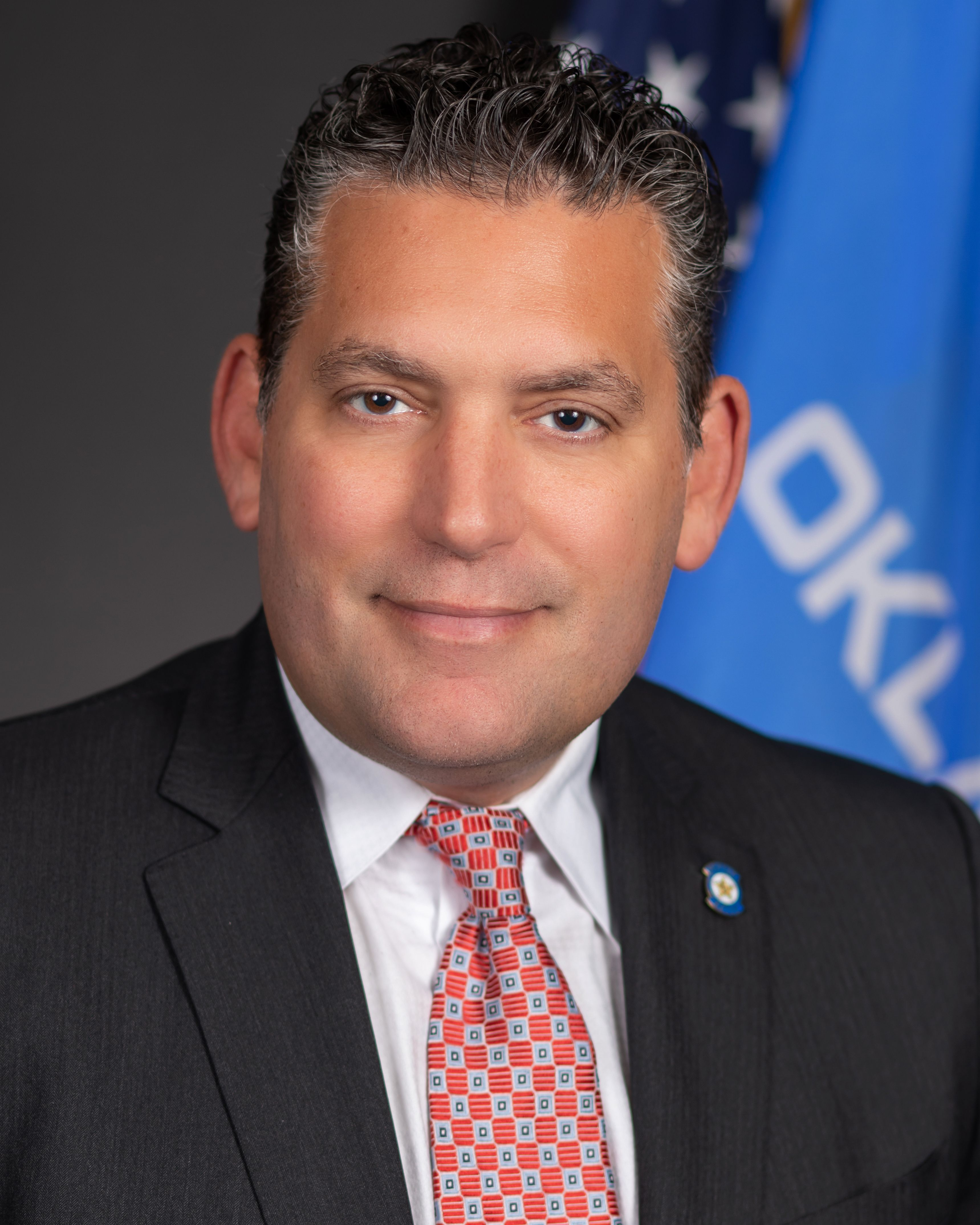

Nominee	Mark Tedford	John Croisant
Party	Republican	Democratic
Popular vote	121,397	110,707
Percentage	52.30%	47.70%
- Tedford: 50–60% 60–70% 70–80% 80–90% >90% Croisant: 50–60% 60–70% 70–80% 80–90% >90%
U.S. Representative before election
Kevin Hern
Republican
Elected U.S. Representative
Mark Tedford
Republican

The 1st district is based in the Tulsa metropolitan area. The incumbent is Republican Kevin Hern, who was re-elected with 60.4% of the vote in 2024. On March 11, 2026, Hern announced he would run for the U.S. Senate, following incumbent senator Markwayne Mullin's appointment as secretary of homeland security.

=== Republican primary ===
The 2026 Republican primary in Oklahoma's 1st congressional district is the largest in the district's history with 11 candidates on the ballot. 13 candidates announced or filed, with Jackson Stalling announcing, but failing to file and Rob Durbin filing before withdrawing. In May, Tulsa pastor Jackson Lahmeyer received an endorsement from President Donald Trump ahead of the primary. Folds of Honor founder Dan Rooney withdrew from the race after Trump's endorsement.

==== Candidates ====
===== Nominee =====
- Mark Tedford, state representative from the 69th district (2022–present)

===== Advanced to runoff, withdrew =====
- Jackson Lahmeyer, pastor and candidate for U.S. Senate in 2022

===== Eliminated in primary =====
- Nathan Butterfield, businessman
- Jed Cochran, former staffer for Tom Coburn and G. T. Bynum
- Kim David, chair of the Oklahoma Corporation Commission (2024–present) from seat 1 (2023–present) and former majority leader of the Oklahoma Senate (2019–2021) from the 18th district (2010–2022)
- Nancy Dyson, landlord
- Courtney Gill, head of innovation for a venture capital firm
- Paul Royse, former police officer
- Kelly B. Walsh, analytical chemist
- Todd Woods, construction company owner

===== Withdrawn =====
- Ronald E. Durbin, former attorney
- Kevin Hern, incumbent U.S. representative (running for U.S. Senate)
- Jackson Stallings, Navy veteran
- Dan Rooney, veteran and former professional golfer (remained on ballot)

===== Declined =====
- Steve Kunzweiler, Tulsa County district attorney (2014–present) (running for re-election)
- Glen Mulready, Oklahoma insurance commissioner (2019–present) and former state representative from the 68th district (2010–2018)
- Matt Pinnell, lieutenant governor of Oklahoma (2019–present)
- Vic Regalado, Tulsa County sheriff (2016–present) (endorsed Butterfield)

==== Endorsements ====
Jackson Lahmeyer (withdrawn)

Executive branch officials

- ~~Donald Trump, president of the United States (2017–2021, 2025–present)~~ (Endorsement revoked)

U.S. representatives

- Anna Paulina Luna, FL-13 (2023–present)
- David McIntosh, former IN-02 (1995–2001)

Local officials

- Rudy Giuliani, former mayor of New York City (1994–2001)

Party officials

- Charity Linch, chair of the Oklahoma Republican Party

Organizations

- Club for Growth
Jackson Stallings (withdrawn)

U.S. Representatives

- Brandon Gill, TX–26 (2025–present)
- Steve Largent, OK-01 (1994–2002)
Mark Tedford

Executive branch officials

- Donald Trump, president of the United States (2017–2021, 2025–present)

==== Fundraising ====
Italics indicate a withdrawn candidate.

Campaign finance reports as of May 27, 2026
Candidate	Raised	Spent	Cash on hand
Nathan Butterfield (R)	$1,018,001	$962,455	$55,546
Kim David (R)	$179,887	$108,715	$71,172
Jackson Lahmeyer (R)	$350,151	$163,712	$186,439
Mark Tedford (R)	$1,448,254	$932,531	$515,723
Jackson Stallings (R)	$52,910	$52,910	$0
Todd Woods (R)	$152,500	$123,225	$29,275
Jed Cochran (R)	$148,714	$114,136	$34,579
Source: Federal Election Commission

==== Results ====
Republican primary results
Party	Candidate	Votes	%
Republican	Mark Tedford	23,230	32.2
Republican	Jackson Lahmeyer	18,699	25.9
Republican	Nathan Butterfield	11,532	16.0
Republican	Kim David	4,722	6.5
Republican	Jed Cochran	3,419	4.7
Republican	Courtney Gill	2,904	4.0
Republican	Dan Rooney	2,520	3.5
Republican	Todd Woods	1,878	2.6
Republican	Nancy Dyson	1,546	2.1
Republican	Kelly B. Walsh	1,452	2.0
Republican	Paul Royse	351	0.5
Total votes		72,253	100.0

=== Democratic primary ===
==== Nominee ====
- John Croisant, Tulsa school board member

==== Withdrawn ====
- Erica Watkins, nonprofit director (filed to run for Oklahoma State Senate for District 12)

==== Endorsements ====
Erica Watkins (withdrawn)

Organizations

- Progressive Victory

==== Fundraising ====
Campaign finance reports as of March 31, 2026
Candidate	Raised	Spent	Cash on hand
John Croisant (D)	$99,541	$63,599	$35,942
Erica Watkins (D)	$12,912	$12,472	$440
Source: Federal Election Commission

=== General election ===
==== Predictions ====
Source	Ranking	As of
Decision Desk HQ	Likely R	October 30, 2026
The Cook Political Report	Solid R	February 6, 2025
Inside Elections	Solid R	March 7, 2025
Sabato's Crystal Ball	Safe R	October 10, 2025

==== Fundraising ====
Campaign finance reports as of May 27, 2026
Candidate	Raised	Spent	Cash on hand
Mark Tedford (R)	$1,448,254	$932,531	$515,723
John Croisant (D)	$124,218	$83,758	$40,460
Source: Federal Election Commission

==== Results ====
2026 Oklahoma's 1st congressional district election
Party	Candidate	Votes	%	±%
Republican	Mark Tedford	121,397	52.30	
Democratic	John Croisant	110,707	47.70	
Total votes		232,104	100.0	

== District 2 ==
2026 Oklahoma's 2nd congressional district election
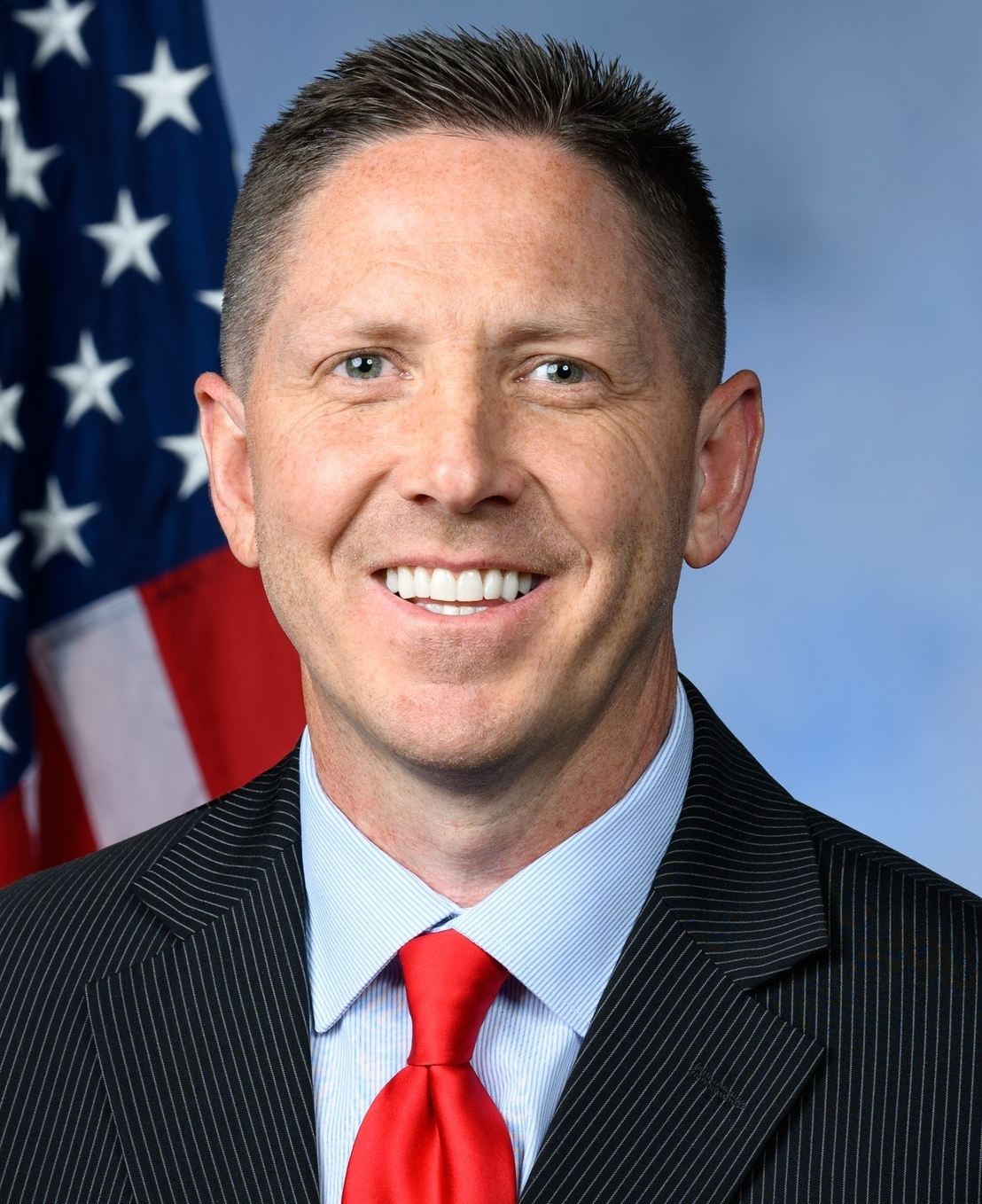

Nominee	Josh Brecheen	Brandon Wade
Party	Republican	Democratic
Popular vote	144,054	61,409
Percentage	67.96%	28.97%
- Brecheen: 40–50% 50–60% 60–70% 70–80% 80–90% >90% Wade: 40–50% 50–60% 60–70% 70–80% 80–90% >90% Tie: 50% No votes
U.S. Representative before election
Josh Brecheen
Republican
Elected U.S. Representative
Josh Brecheen
Republican

The 2nd district is based in eastern Oklahoma, including much of the Green Country and Little Dixie regions. The incumbent is Republican Josh Brecheen, who was elected with 74.2% of the vote in 2024.

=== Republican primary ===
==== Nominee ====
- Josh Brecheen, incumbent U.S. representative

==== Eliminated in primary ====
- Will Webb, veteran and peer support specialist

==== Endorsements ====
Josh Brecheen

Organizations

- AIPAC
- Freedom Caucus Fund

==== Fundraising ====
Campaign finance reports as of March 31, 2026
Candidate	Raised	Spent	Cash on hand
Josh Brecheen (R)	$160,289	$185,677	$45,308
Source: Federal Election Commission

==== Results ====
Republican primary results
Party	Candidate	Votes	%
Republican	Josh Brecheen (incumbent)	65,906	79.2
Republican	Will Webb	17,308	20.8
Total votes		83,214	100.0

=== Democratic primary ===
==== Nominee ====
- Brandon Wade, machinery assembler, candidate for U.S. Senate in 2022 and nominee for this district in 2024

==== Eliminated in primary ====
- Erik Terwey, candidate for Bartlesville City Council in 2020

==== Fundraising ====
Campaign finance reports as of March 31, 2026
Candidate	Raised	Spent	Cash on hand
Erik Terwey (D)	$9,482	$6,020	$3,461
Brandon Wade (D)	$2,680	$1,800	$82
Source: Federal Election Commission

==== Results ====
Democratic primary results
Party	Candidate	Votes	%
Democratic	Brandon Wade	20,336	73.7
Democratic	Erik Terwey	7,245	26.3
Total votes		27,581	100.0

=== Independents ===
==== Declared ====
- Ronnie Hopkins, pastor and candidate for this seat in 2024

=== General election ===
==== Predictions ====
Source	Ranking	As of
Decision Desk HQ	Safe R	July 14, 2026
The Cook Political Report	Solid R	February 6, 2025
Inside Elections	Solid R	March 7, 2025
Sabato's Crystal Ball	Safe R	October 10, 2025

==== Fundraising ====
Campaign finance reports as of May 27, 2026
Candidate	Raised	Spent	Cash on hand
Josh Brecheen (R)	$138,584	$206,407	$47,873
Brandon Wade (D)	$4,080	$1,879	$1,321
Ronnie Hopkins (I)	$0	$0	$0
Source: Federal Election Commission

==== Results ====
2026 Oklahoma's 2nd congressional district election
Party	Candidate	Votes	%	±%
Republican	Josh Brecheen (incumbent)	144,054	67.96	
Democratic	Brandon Wade	61,409	28.97	
Independent	Ronnie Hopkins	6,520	3.08	
Total votes		211,983	100.0	

== District 3 ==
2026 Oklahoma's 3rd congressional district election
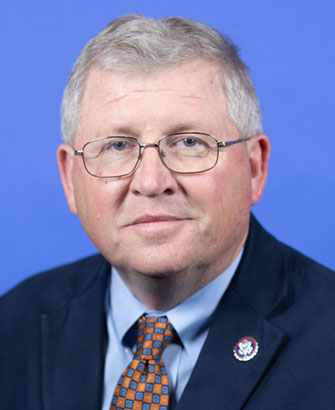

Nominee	Frank Lucas	Suzie Byrd
Party	Republican	Democratic
Popular vote	122,181	68,832
Percentage	63.96%	36.04%
- Lucas: 50–60% 60–70% 70–80% 80–90% >90% Byrd: 50–60% 60–70% 70–80% 80–90% >90% Tie: 50% No votes
U.S. Representative before election
Frank Lucas
Republican
Elected U.S. Representative
Frank Lucas
Republican

The 3rd district is based in western Oklahoma, including Enid, Stillwater, and the Oklahoma Panhandle. The incumbent is Republican Frank Lucas, who was re-elected unopposed in 2024.

=== Republican primary ===
==== Nominee ====
- Frank Lucas, incumbent U.S. representative

==== Eliminated in primary ====
- Wade Burleson, author and retired pastor for Emmanuel Baptist Church and candidate for this district in 2022

==== Endorsements ====
Frank Lucas

Organizations

- AIPAC

==== Fundraising ====
Campaign finance reports as of March 31, 2026
Candidate	Raised	Spent	Cash on hand
Frank Lucas (R)	$559,220	$336,436	$841,068
Source: Federal Election Commission

==== Results ====
Republican primary results
Party	Candidate	Votes	%
Republican	Frank Lucas (incumbent)	55,631	70.8
Republican	Wade Burleson	22,975	29.2
Total votes		78,606	100.0

=== Democratic primary ===
==== Nominee ====
- Suzie Byrd, newspaper reporter for Enid News & Eagle

==== Eliminated in primary ====
- Jules Roberson, warehouse worker

==== Fundraising ====
Campaign finance reports as of March 31, 2026
Candidate	Raised	Spent	Cash on hand
Jules Roberson (D)	$945	$434	$510
Source: Federal Election Commission

==== Results ====
Democratic primary results
Party	Candidate	Votes	%
Democratic	Suzie Byrd	16,504	67.4
Democratic	Jules Roberson	7,971	32.6
Total votes		24,475	100.0

=== General election ===
==== Predictions ====
Source	Ranking	As of
Decision Desk HQ	Safe R	July 14, 2026
The Cook Political Report	Solid R	February 6, 2025
Inside Elections	Solid R	March 7, 2025
Sabato's Crystal Ball	Safe R	October 10, 2025

==== Fundraising ====
Campaign finance reports as of May 27, 2026
Candidate	Raised	Spent	Cash on hand
Frank Lucas (R)	$730,151	$875,556	$472,880
Suzie Byrd (D)	$0	$0	$0
Source: Federal Election Commission

==== Results ====
2026 Oklahoma's 3rd congressional district election
Party	Candidate	Votes	%	±%
Republican	Frank Lucas (incumbent)	122,181	63.96	
Democratic	Suzie Byrd	68,832	36.04	
Total votes		191,013	100.0	

== District 4 ==
2026 Oklahoma's 4th congressional district election
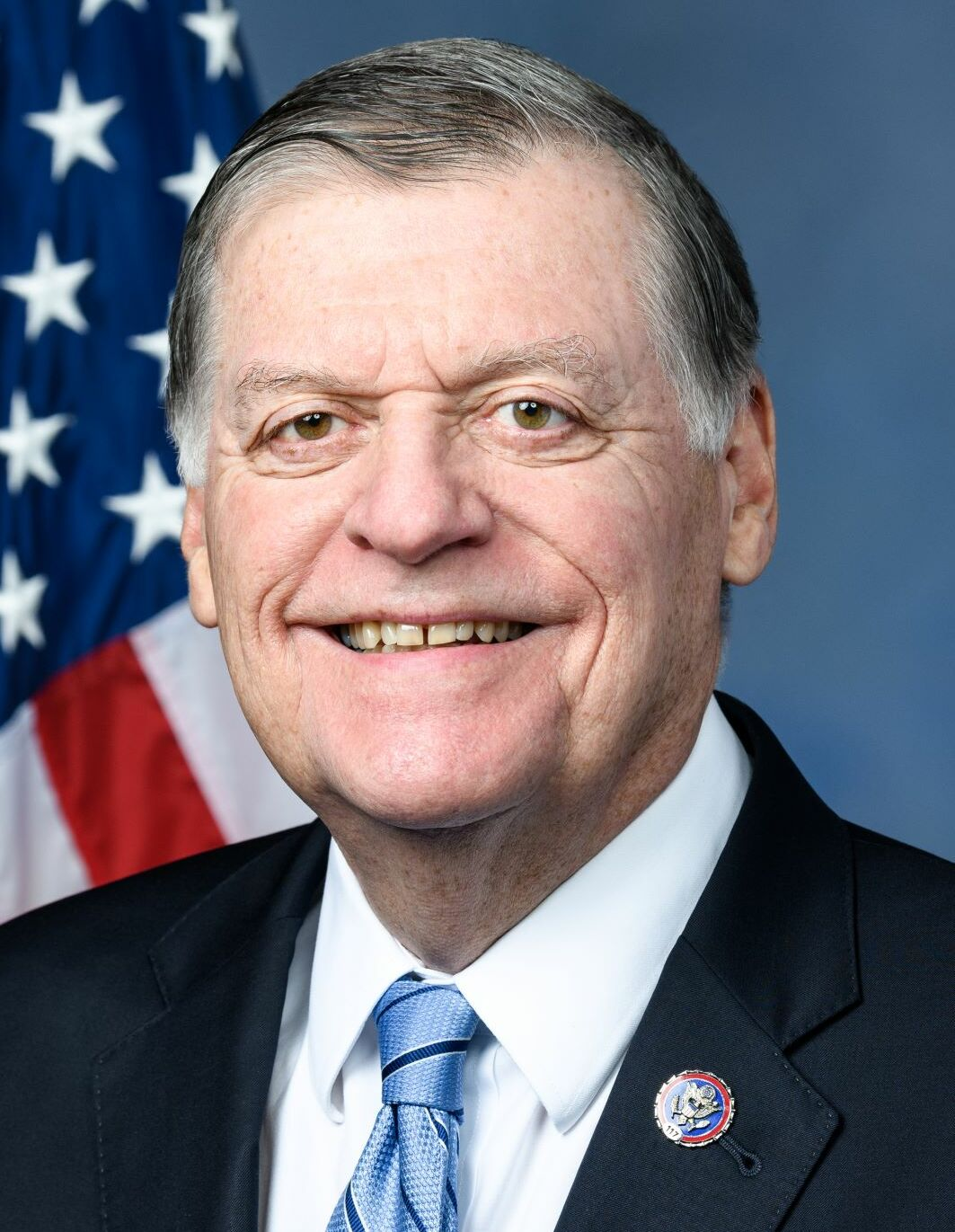

Nominee	Tom Cole	Mitchell Jacob
Party	Republican	Democratic
Popular vote	125,631	86,108
Percentage	57.60%	39.48%
- Cole: 40–50% 50–60% 60–70% 70–80% 80–90% >90% Jacob: 40–50% 50–60% 60–70% 70–80% 80–90% No votes
U.S. Representative before election
Tom Cole
Republican
Elected U.S. Representative
Tom Cole
Republican

The 4th district is based in southern Oklahoma, including Lawton, Norman, and southern Oklahoma City. The incumbent is Republican Tom Cole, who was re-elected with 65.3% of the vote in 2024.

=== Republican primary ===
==== Nominee ====
- Tom Cole, incumbent U.S. representative

==== Eliminated in primary ====
- Marcie Everhart, retired businesswoman

==== Endorsements ====
Tom Cole

Organizations

- AIPAC

==== Fundraising ====
Campaign finance reports as of March 31, 2026
Candidate	Raised	Spent	Cash on hand
Tom Cole (R)	$3,210,606	$2,195,220	$2,795,659
Source: Federal Election Commission

==== Results ====
Republican primary results
Party	Candidate	Votes	%
Republican	Tom Cole (incumbent)	52,717	71.1
Republican	Marcie Everhart	21,402	28.9
Total votes		74,119	100.0

=== Democratic primary ===
==== Nominee ====
- Mitchell Jacob, nominee for state representative from the 20th district in 2024

==== Eliminated in primary ====
- Jeff Pixley, retired U.S. Air Force colonel

==== Withdrawn ====
- Mary Brannon, nominee for this district in 2018, 2020, 2022, and 2024
- Kody Macaulay, IT specialist and candidate for this district in 2024

==== Fundraising ====
Campaign finance reports as of March 31, 2026
Candidate	Raised	Spent	Cash on hand
Mitchell Jacob (D)	$53,062	$48,950	$4,111
Jeff Pixley (D)	$49,886	$17,879	$32,007
Source: Federal Election Commission

==== Results ====
Democratic primary results
Party	Candidate	Votes	%
Democratic	Mitchell Jacob	18,243	54.4
Democratic	Jeff Pixley	15,266	45.6
Total votes		33,509	100.0

=== Independents ===
==== Declared ====
- Rocco Bonacci, member of the Lawton Access Board

=== General election ===
==== Predictions ====
Source	Ranking	As of
Decision Desk HQ	Safe R	July 14, 2026
The Cook Political Report	Solid R	February 6, 2025
Inside Elections	Solid R	March 7, 2025
Sabato's Crystal Ball	Safe R	October 10, 2025

==== Fundraising ====
Campaign finance reports as of May 27, 2026
Candidate	Raised	Spent	Cash on hand
Tom Cole (R)	$3,592,381	$2,799,380	$2,573,275
Mitchell Jacob (D)	$61,283	$57,741	$3,542
Rocco Bonacci (I)	$0	$0	$0
Source: Federal Election Commission

==== Results ====
2026 Oklahoma's 4th congressional district election
Party	Candidate	Votes	%	±%
Republican	Tom Cole (incumbent)	125,631	57.60	
Democratic	Mitchell Jacob	86,108	39.48	
Independent	Rocco Bonacci	6,389	2.93	
Total votes		218,128	100.0	

== District 5 ==
2026 Oklahoma's 5th congressional district election
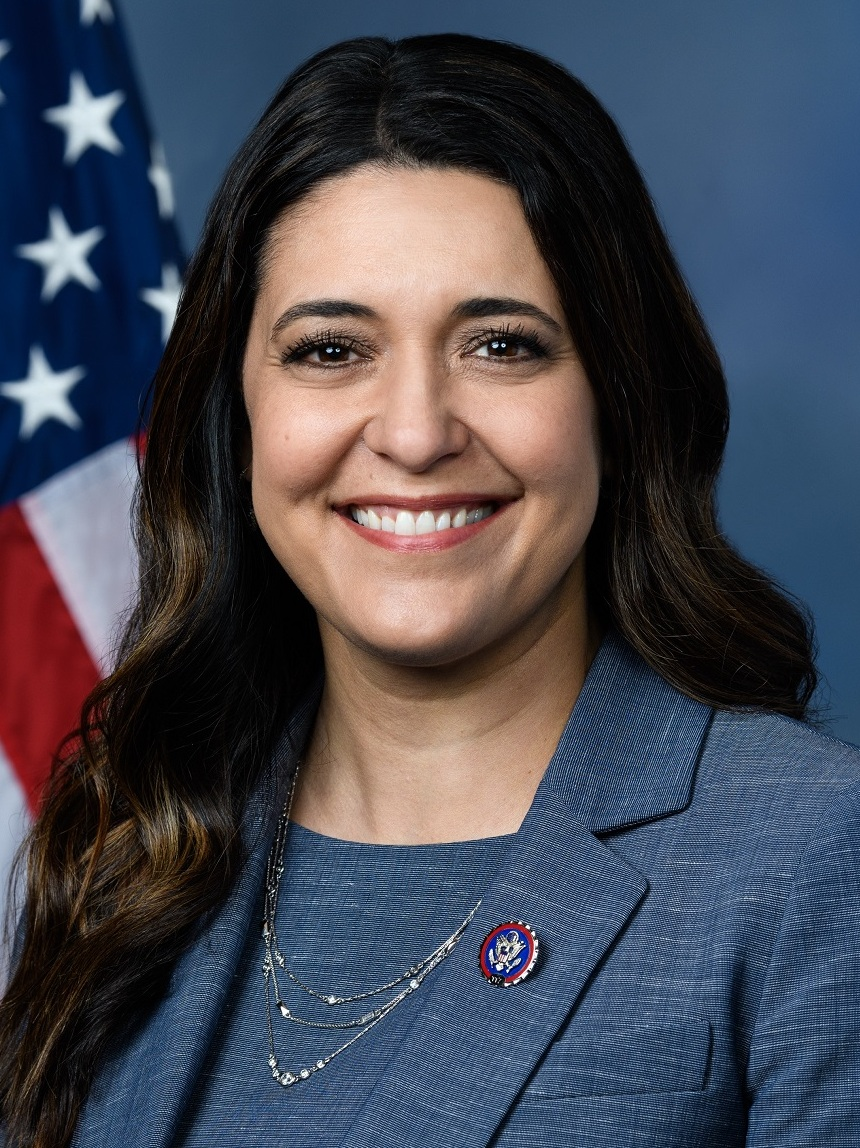

Nominee	Stephanie Bice	Jena Nelson
Party	Republican	Democratic
Popular vote	131,023	127,687
Percentage	49.48%	48.22%
- Bice: 40–50% 50–60% 60–70% 70–80% 80–90% Nelson: 40–50% 50–60% 60–70% 70–80% 80–90% >90% Tie: 40–50% No votes
U.S. Representative before election
Stephanie Bice
Republican
Elected U.S. Representative
Stephanie Bice
Republican

The 5th district is based in the Oklahoma City metropolitan area and surrounding rural areas. The incumbent is Republican Stephanie Bice, who was re-elected with 60.7% of the vote in 2024. She considered a run for the U.S. Senate, following incumbent senator Markwayne Mullin's appointment as secretary of homeland security, but announced she would instead seek re-election on March 13, 2026.

=== Republican primary ===
==== Nominee ====
- Stephanie Bice, incumbent U.S. representative

==== Endorsements ====
Stephanie Bice

Executive branch officials

- Donald Trump, president of the United States (2017–2021, 2025–present)

Organizations

- AIPAC
- Maggie's List

==== Fundraising ====
Campaign finance reports as of March 31, 2026
Candidate	Raised	Spent	Cash on hand
Stephanie Bice (R)	$1,530,776	$739,751	$1,876,974
Source: Federal Election Commission

=== Democratic primary ===
==== Nominee ====
- Jena Nelson, Oklahoma Teacher of the Year (2020) and nominee for Oklahoma Superintendent of Public Instruction in 2022

==== Eliminated in primary ====
- Trey Martin, ironworker & President of Ironworkers Local 48

==== Endorsements ====
Trey Martin

U.S. senators

- Bernie Sanders, Vermont (2007-present)

Organizations

- Our Revolution

==== Fundraising ====
Campaign finance reports as of May 27, 2026
Candidate	Raised	Spent	Cash on hand
Trey Martin (D)	$84,577	$5,294	$79,158
Jena Nelson (D)	$405,443	$401,844	$3,598
Source: Federal Election Commission

==== Results ====
Democratic primary results
Party	Candidate	Votes	%
Democratic	Jena Nelson	26,886	56.7
Democratic	Trey Martin	20,491	43.3
Total votes		47,377	100.0

=== Independents ===
Declared

- Robert P. Henri (Independent)
- Austin Nieves, entertainer and dancer (Independent)

=== General election ===
==== Predictions ====
Source	Ranking	As of
Decision Desk HQ	Likely R	July 14, 2026
The Cook Political Report	Solid R	February 6, 2025
Inside Elections	Likely R	October 29, 2026
Sabato's Crystal Ball	Safe R	October 10, 2025

==== Post-primary endorsements ====
Stephanie Bice (R)

Organizations

- U.S. Chamber of Commerce
Jena Nelson (D)

Organizations

- National Women's Political Caucus
- High School Democrats of America

==== Fundraising ====
Campaign finance reports as of May 27, 2026
Candidate	Raised	Spent	Cash on hand
Stephanie Bice (R)	$1,664,697	$880,849	$1,869,797
Jena Nelson (D)	$405,443	$401,845	$3,598
Robert Henri (I)	$78	$78	$0
Austin Nieves (I)	$0	$0	$0
Source: Federal Election Commission

==== Polling ====
Poll source	Date(s) administered	Sample size (Note: Key: A – all adults RV – registered voters LV – likely voters V – unclear)	Margin of error	Stephanie Bice	Jena Nelson	Undecided
GBAO (D) (Note: Poll sponsored by Nelson's campaign)	September 17–20, 2026	500 (LV)	?	48%	43%	9%

==== Results ====
2026 Oklahoma's 5th congressional district election
Party	Candidate	Votes	%	±%
Republican	Stephanie Bice (incumbent)	131,023	49.48	
Democratic	Jena Nelson	127,687	48.22	
Independent	Robert Henri	4,027	1.52	
Independent	Austin Nieves	2,047	0.77	
Total votes		264,784		
