= 2026 United States Senate election in Oklahoma =

- November 3, 2026
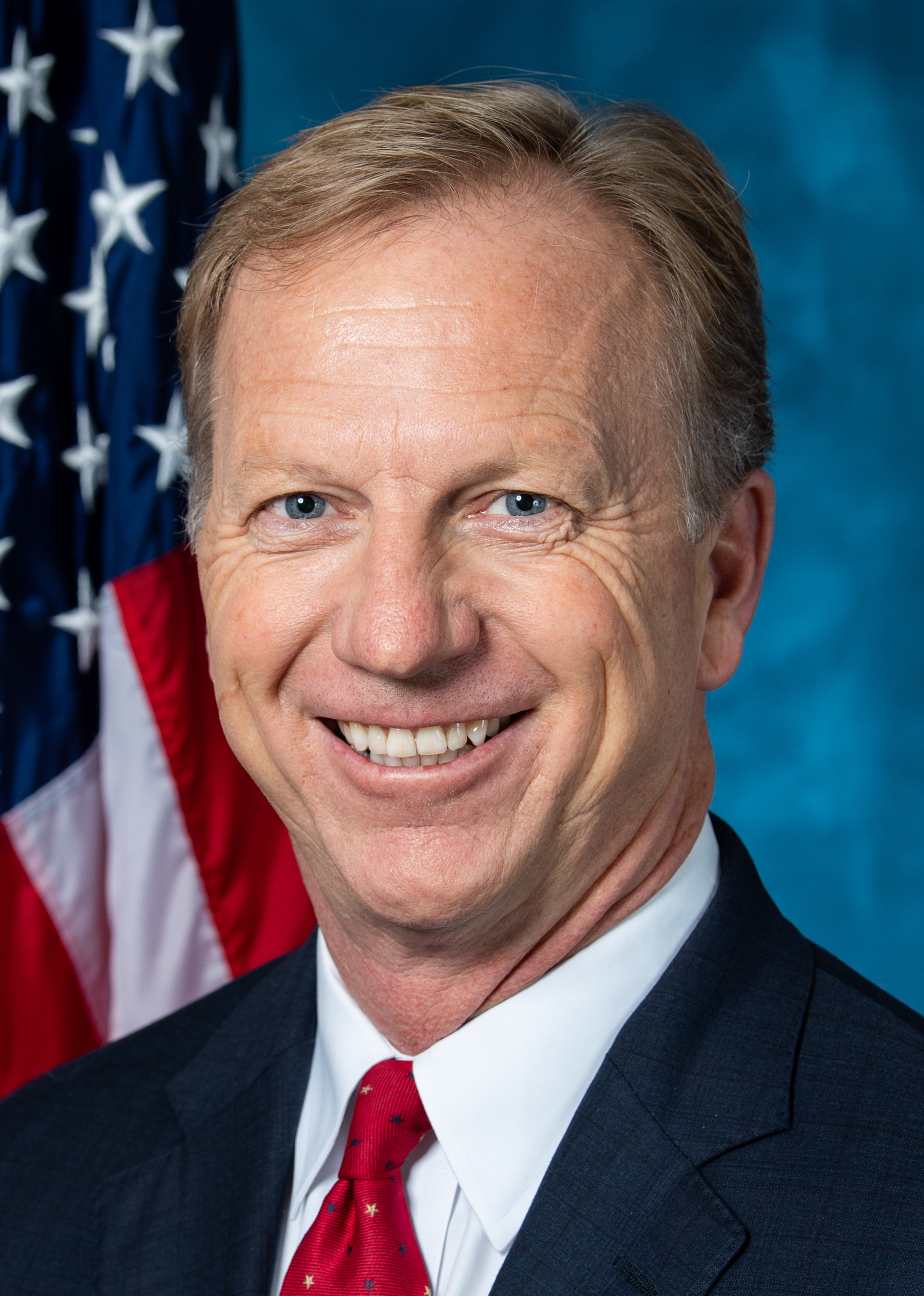

Nominee	Kevin Hern	N'Kiyla Jasmine Thomas
Party	Republican	Democratic
Popular vote	639,860	439,522
Percentage	57.20%	39.29%
- Hern: 40–50% 50–60% 60–70% 70–80% 80–90% >90% Thomas: 40–50% 50–60% 60–70% 70–80% 80–90% >90% Tie: 40–50% 50% No votes
U.S. senator before election
Alan Armstrong (Note: In March 2026, incumbent senator Markwayne Mullin resigned to become the United States secretary of homeland security. Governor Kevin Stitt then appointed Armstrong as an interim successor.)
Republican
Elected U.S. senator
Kevin Hern
Republican

The 2026 United States Senate election in Oklahoma was held on November 3, 2026, to elect a member of the U.S. Senate to represent the state of Oklahoma. Republican representative Kevin Hern defeated Democratic nurse N'Kiyla Jasmine Thomas. Republican appointee Alan Armstrong, who was named to the seat in March after Markwayne Mullin resigned to become secretary of homeland security, was prohibited by state law from seeking a full term.

Primary elections were held on June 16. Hern, endorsed by President Donald Trump, won the Republican nomination with 69.8% of the vote over country singer Ty England. After no candidate received a majority in the Democratic primary, Thomas defeated attorney Jim Priest in a runoff on August 25 with 61.2% of the vote.

== Background ==
A United States Senate election in Oklahoma was held on November 3, 2026, to elect a member of the U.S. Senate to represent the state of Oklahoma. Primary elections took place on June 16 with runoff elections on August 25 in races where no candidate received over 50 percent of the vote in June. The candidate filing deadline was April 3. If only one candidate files for a party's nomination, they are declared the nominee.

The seat was originally held by Jim Inhofe, who was last elected in 2020. Two years later, in 2022, then-Congressman Markwayne Mullin won a special election to finish Inhofe's term after Inhofe had announced his resignation at the end of the 117th Congress. After Donald Trump won the 2024 United States presidential election, Mullin was rumored as a contender for secretary of the interior. Mullin's resignation would have affected the gubernatorial election, as governor Kevin Stitt would have appointed a replacement who must sign a potentially unenforceable (Note: While state law requires the appointee to sign an oath promising not to run for the following term, federal law may prevent its enforcement. The oath could lead to litigation if an appointee challenges the law.) oath promising not to run for reelection in 2026. Mullin was ultimately not nominated as the secretary of interior. However, in March 2026, Mullin was named as Trump's pick to replace secretary of homeland security Kristi Noem and was confirmed on March 23, 2026.

== Interim appointment ==
Mullin was confirmed as the secretary of homeland security and resigned as senator on March 23, 2026. Governor Kevin Stitt was required to appoint a replacement within 30 days. He stated the appointee would serve the remainder of the current term until January 3, 2027, though state law provides that the appointment lasts only until the November election is certified by the Oklahoma State Election Board. The interim appointee must have been a registered Republican for the past five years, and they would have to sign an oath stating they will not run in the 2026 election. On March 24, 2026, Governor Stitt announced that oil and gas executive Alan Armstrong would replace Mullin; Armstrong was sworn in by senator Chuck Grassley later that day.

== Republican primary ==
=== Candidates ===
On March 5, 2026, Trump announced that Mullin would replace Homeland Security secretary Kristi Noem at the end of the month. Mullin was confirmed by the Senate on March 23, 2026.

==== Nominee ====
- Kevin Hern, U.S. representative for Oklahoma's 1st congressional district (2018–present)

==== Eliminated in primary ====
- William Sean Buckner, Air Force veteran and former real estate broker
- Ty England, country singer
- Nick Hankins, business intelligence developer and candidate for Oklahoma's 4th congressional district in 2024
- Brian Ragain, retired firefighter-paramedic for the Chickasha Fire Department and registered nurse

==== Withdrawn ====
- Ron Meinhardt, executive director of Entering Wedge Media (now running as an independent)
- Markwayne Mullin, incumbent U.S. senator (appointed U.S. secretary of homeland security)
- Tammy Swearengin, tax accountant and financial advisor
- Wayne Lonny Washington, chairman of the Washington Brown Foundation

==== Declined ====
- Stephanie Bice, U.S. representative for Oklahoma's 5th congressional district (2021–present) (running for re-election)
- Josh Brecheen, U.S. representative for Oklahoma's 2nd congressional district (2023–present) (running for re-election; endorsed Hern)
- G.T. Bynum, former mayor of Tulsa (2016–2024)
- Kyle Hilbert, speaker of the Oklahoma House of Representatives (2025–present) from the 29th district (2016–present)
- Matt Pinnell, lieutenant governor of Oklahoma (2019–present)
- Kevin Stitt, governor of Oklahoma (2019–present)

==== Ineligible ====
- Alan Armstrong, incumbent U.S. senator (2026–present) (Note: Armstrong is prohibited from running for a full term by state law.)

=== Endorsements ===
Nick Hankins

Organizations

- Anti-Zionist America PAC
Kevin Hern

Executive branch officials

- Donald Trump, president of the United States (2017–2021, 2025–present) (previously endorsed Mullin)

U.S. senators

- Jim Banks, Indiana (2025–present)
- Bill Hagerty, Tennessee (2021–present)
- Ron Johnson, Wisconsin (2011–present)
- James Lankford, Oklahoma (2015–present) (previously declined to endorse)
- Rick Scott, Florida (2019–present)
- Tim Scott, South Carolina (2013–present)
- John Thune, Senate majority leader (2025–present) from South Dakota (2005–present)

U.S. representatives

- Josh Brecheen, OK-02 (2023–present)

Organizations

- AIPAC (previously endorsed Mullin)
- Club for Growth
- Tulsa Firefighters PAC
Markwayne Mullin (withdrawn)

Executive branch officials

- ~~Donald Trump, president of the United States (2017–2021, 2025–present)~~ (later endorsed Hern)

Organizations

- ~~AIPAC~~ (later endorsed Hern)
Declined to endorse

U.S. senators

- ~~James Lankford, Oklahoma (2015–present)~~ (later endorsed Hern)

=== Fundraising ===
Campaign finance reports as of March 31, 2026
Candidate	Raised	Spent	Cash on hand
Kevin Hern (R)	$8,284,047	$67,761	$8,216,286
Source: Federal Election Commission

=== Polling ===
Poll source	Date(s) administered	Sample size (Note: Key: A – all adults RV – registered voters LV – likely voters V – unclear)	Margin of error	William Sean Buckner	Gary Ty England	Nick Hankins	Kevin Hern	Brian Ragain	Undecided
JMC Analytics (R)	June 2–3, 2026	550 (LV)	± 4.2%	2%	8%	1%	41%	4%	44%

Hypothetical polling

Poll source	Date(s) administered	Sample size	Margin of error	Stephanie Bice	Kevin Hern	Kevin Stitt	Undecided
Pulse Decision Science (R) (Note: Poll sponsored by Club for Growth)	March 7–9, 2026	510 (LV)	± 4.4%	–	52%	40%	8%
Pulse Decision Science (R)	March 7–9, 2026	510 (LV)	± 4.4%	37%	49%	–	14%

=== Results ===
Primary results by county: Hern: 40–50%; 50–60%; 60–70%; 70–80%; 80–90%

Republican primary results
Party	Candidate	Votes	%
Republican	Kevin Hern	267,222	69.8
Republican	Ty England	51,875	13.5
Republican	William Sean Buckner	26,444	6.9
Republican	Brian Ragain	22,478	5.9
Republican	Nick Hankins	15,066	3.9
Total votes		383,085	100.0

== Democratic primary ==
=== Candidates ===
==== Nominee ====
- N'Kiyla Jasmine Thomas, nurse

==== Eliminated in runoff ====
- Jim Priest, lawyer and former CEO of Sunbeam Family Services and Goodwill Industries of Central Oklahoma

==== Eliminated in primary ====
- R.O. Joe Cassity Jr., attorney and candidate for U.S. Senate in 2020
- Troy Green, founder and president of Safe Haven
- Ervin Yen, former Republican state senator for the 40th district (2015–2019), and independent candidate for governor in 2022

=== Endorsements ===
Jim Priest

Statewide elected officials

- Drew Edmondson, former Oklahoma Attorney General
- Brad Henry, former Governor of Oklahoma
- David Walters, former Governor of Oklahoma

=== First round ===
==== Fundraising ====
Campaign finance reports as of March 31, 2026
Candidate	Raised	Spent	Cash on hand
Troy Green (D)	$22,600	$15,373	$7,227
Jim Priest (D)	$203,272	$68,438	$134,834
N'Kiyla Jasmine Thomas (D)	$39,009	$36,270	$3,674
Source: Federal Election Commission

==== Results ====
Primary results by county: Thomas: 30–40%; 40–50%; 50–60%; Priest: 20–30%; 30–40%; 40–50%; Green: 30–40%; 40–50%

Democratic primary results
Party	Candidate	Votes	%
Democratic	N'Kiyla Jasmine Thomas	76,330	45.2
Democratic	Jim Priest	40,290	23.9
Democratic	Troy Green	33,492	19.8
Democratic	Ervin Yen	11,363	6.7
Democratic	R.O. Joe Cassity Jr.	7,421	4.4
Total votes		168,896	100.0

=== Runoff ===
==== Fundraising ====
Campaign finance reports as of August 5, 2026
Candidate	Raised	Spent	Cash on hand
Jim Priest (D)	$370,493	$314,643	$55,851
N'Kiyla Jasmine Thomas (D)	$57,159	$57,639	$456
Source: Federal Election Commission

==== Results ====
Runoff results by county: Thomas: 50–60%; 60–70%; 70–80%; Priest: 50–60%; 60–70%; 70–80%

Democratic primary runoff results
Party	Candidate	Votes	%
Democratic	N'Kiyla Jasmine Thomas	79,229	61.2
Democratic	Jim Priest	50,249	38.8
Total votes		129,478	100.0

== Libertarian primary ==
=== Candidates ===
==== Nominee ====
- Sevier White, nominee for Oklahoma's 4th congressional district in 2016

== Independents ==
=== Candidates ===
==== Declared ====
- Ron Meinhardt, executive director of Entering Wedge Media (previously ran as a Republican)
- Curtis Stinnett, pharmacist

== General election ==
=== Predictions ===
Source	Ranking	As of
The Cook Political Report	Solid R	November 2, 2026
Decision Desk HQ	Safe R	November 3, 2026
The Economist (Note: The Economist's prediction model uses unconventional terminology. For the purpose of equivalency, their "Very Likely" ratings are formatted as a "Likely" rating while "Likely" ratings are formatted as a "Lean" rating.)	Safe R	November 3, 2026
FiftyPlusOne	Safe R	November 3, 2026
Fox News	Solid R	November 1, 2026
Inside Elections	Solid R	October 29, 2026
MS NOW	Safe R	October 29, 2026
NBC News	Solid R	November 3, 2026
RealClearPolitics	Solid R	November 2, 2026
Sabato's Crystal Ball	Safe R	November 2, 2026
Silver Bulletin	Solid R	November 3, 2026
Split Ticket	Safe R	November 2, 2026

=== Post-primary endorsements ===
N'Kiyla Jasmine Thomas (D)

Organizations

- National Women's Political Caucus

=== Fundraising ===
Campaign finance reports as of October 14, 2026
Candidate	Raised	Spent	Cash on hand
Kevin Hern (R)	$10,862,233	$8,050,247	$2,811,987
N'Kiyla Jasmine Thomas (D)	$115,954	$92,789	$24,102
Source: Federal Election Commission

=== Polling ===
Poll source	Date(s) administered	Sample size	Margin of error	Kevin Hern (R)	N'Kiyla Jasmine Thomas (D)	Other	Undecided
CHS & Associates	August 3–6, 2026	500 (RV)	± 4.3%	49%	25%	8% (Note: Curtis Stinnett (I) with 4%; Sevier White (L) with 3%; Ron Meinhard (I) with 1%)	19%

Hypothetical polling

Kevin Hern vs. Jim Priest

Poll source	Date(s) administered	Sample size	Margin of error	Kevin Hern (R)	Jim Priest (D)	Other	Undecided
CHS & Associates	August 3–6, 2026	500 (RV)	± 4.3%	48%	27%	10% (Note: Ron Meinhard (I) with 5%; Curtis Stinnett (I) with 3%; Sevier White (L) with 2%)	14%

=== Results ===
2026 United States Senate election in Oklahoma
Party	Candidate	Votes	%	±%
Republican	Kevin Hern	639,860	57.20	
Democratic	N'Kiyla Jasmine Thomas	439,522	39.29	
Independent	Curtis Stinnett	14,635	1.31	
Independent	Ron Meinhardt	14,504	1.30	
Libertarian	Sevier White	10,209	0.91	
Total votes		1,118,730		
Republican hold				

==== By congressional district ====
Hern won all five congressional districts.

District	Thomas	Hern	Elected Representative
1st	44.65%	51.93%	Mark Tedford
2nd	27.77%	68.63%	Josh Brecheen
3rd	34.81%	61.90%	Frank Lucas
4th	40.27%	56.16%	Tom Cole
5th	46.30%	50.04%	Stephanie Bice

== Notes ==
Partisan clients
