= Jasmine Thomas =

Jasmine Thomas may refer to:

- Jasmine Thomas (basketball), an American professional basketball player
- Jasmine Thomas (Emmerdale), a character in the British soap opera Emmerdale
- N'Kiyla Jasmine Thomas, a candidate in the 2026 United States Senate election in Oklahoma
