= Oklahoma's congressional districts =

U.S. House districts in the state of Oklahoma

Map of Oklahoma's congressional districts since 2023 Interactive map version

As of the 2020 census, there are five United States congressional districts in Oklahoma. It was one of the states that was able to keep the same number of congressional districts from the previous census (in the past, Oklahoma has had as many as nine House of Representatives seats). Following the 2018 elections, a Democratic challenger ousted a Republican incumbent, changing the congressional delegation to a 4-1 Republican majority. The Republicans regained the seat in 2020 when Stephanie Bice defeated Kendra Horn.

== Current districts and representatives ==
This is a list of United States representatives from Oklahoma, their terms, their district boundaries, and the district political ratings according to the CPVI. The delegation has a total of 5 members, all 5 being members of the Republican Party.

Oklahoma’s congressional districts are an example of a partisan gerrymander, in this case favouring the Republican Party, which has full control over redistricting in the state. Oklahoma County has a very evenly split partisan composition and had a population almost exactly equal to that needed for a single congressional district, but in 2021 redistricting, Republican state legislators ‘split’ the county to ensure that all five congressional districts leaned Republican.

Current U.S. representatives from Oklahoma
District	Member (Residence)	Party	Incumbent since	CPVI (2025)	District map
1st	Kevin Hern (Tulsa)	Republican	November 13, 2018	R+11	
2nd	Josh Brecheen (Coalgate)	Republican	January 3, 2023	R+28	
3rd	Frank Lucas (Cheyenne)	Republican	May 10, 1994	R+23	
4th	Tom Cole (Moore)	Republican	January 3, 2003	R+17	
5th	Stephanie Bice (Oklahoma City)	Republican	January 3, 2021	R+9	

== Historical and present district boundaries ==
Table of United States congressional district boundary maps in the State of Oklahoma, presented chronologically. All redistricting events that took place in Oklahoma between 1973 and 2013 are shown.

Year	Statewide map	Oklahoma City highlight
1973–1982		
1983–1992		
1993–2002		
2003–2013		
2013–2023		
Since 2023		

== See also ==
- List of United States congressional districts
- Politics of Oklahoma
- Oklahoma Democratic Party
- Oklahoma Libertarian Party
- Oklahoma Republican Party
