= Mark Tedford =

American politician (born 1969)

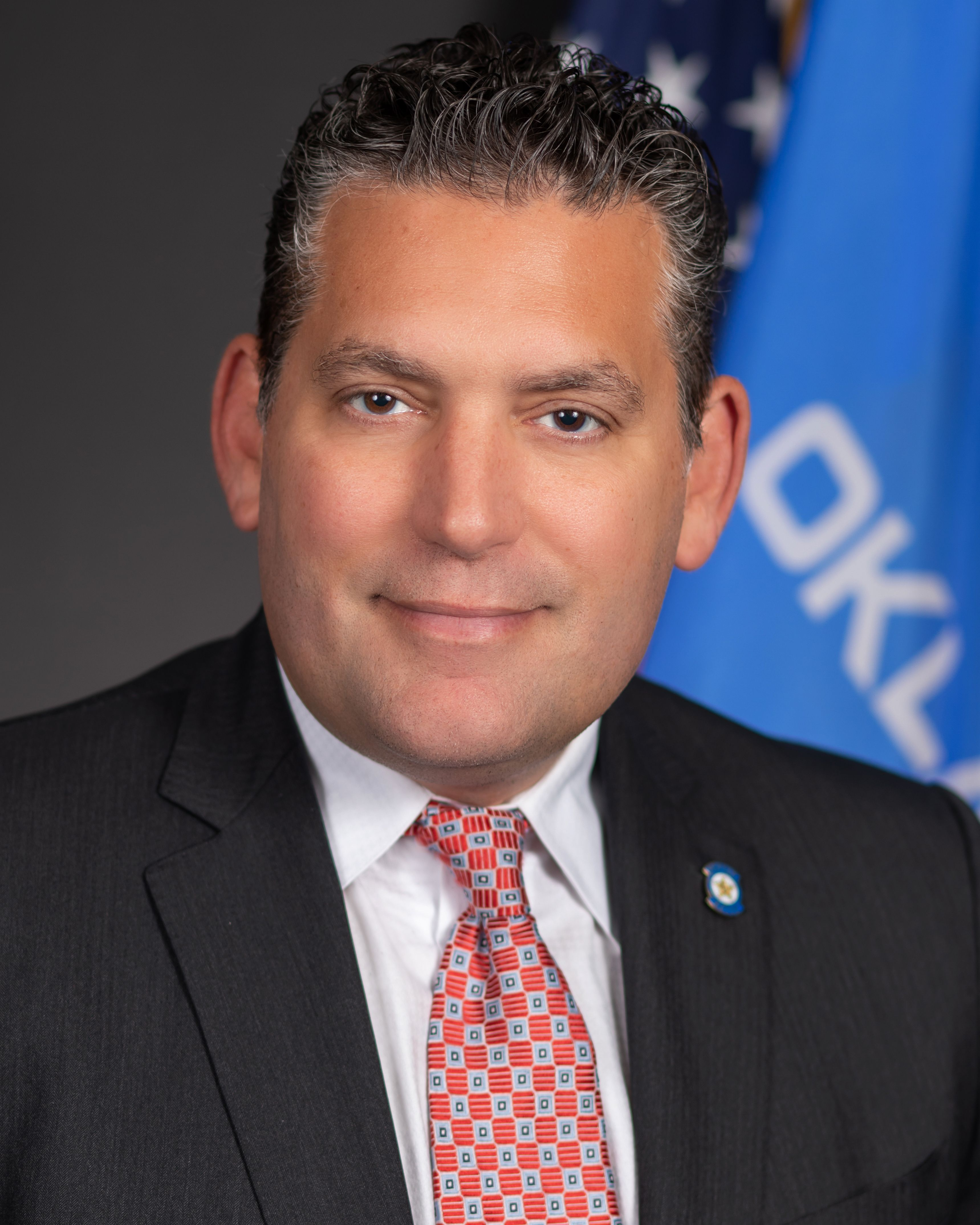
- Official portrait, 2023

Member-elect of the U.S. House of Representatives from Oklahoma's 1st district
- Assuming office January 3, 2027
- Succeeding: Kevin Hern

Member of the Oklahoma House of Representatives from the 69th district
- Incumbent
- Assumed office November 16, 2022
- Preceded by: Sheila Dills

Personal details
- Born: Mark Andrew Tedford; June 26, 1969 (age 57) Lafayette, Louisiana, U.S.
- Party: Republican
- Spouse: Kristin Anderson (m. 1992)
- Children: 4
- Education: Missouri Southern State University (BS); University of Tulsa (MBA); Biola University (MA)

Mark Andrew Tedford (born June 26, 1969) is an American politician and insurance agent who is the Oklahoma House of Representatives member from the 69th district. He represents Jenks and South Tulsa.

Tedford was born in Lafayette, Louisiana, and raised in Jenks, Oklahoma, before graduating from Missouri Southern State University which he attended on a football scholarship. In 2022, he was elected to the Oklahoma House of Representatives to succeed retiring Representative Sheila Dills. He was initially elected and reelected in 2024 unopposed.

In 2026, he filed for the Republican Party's nomination to succeed Kevin Hern in the U.S. House of Representatives. After advancing to a Republican primary runoff with Jackson Lahmeyer, Lahmeyer dropped out, making Tedford the nominee. He is endorsed by President Donald Trump.

== Early life, education and family ==
Mark Andrew Tedford was born on June 26, 1969, to George and Kay Tedford in Lafayette, Louisiana. He graduated from Jenks High School and signed with Missouri Southern State University to play for their football team in 1988. He married Kristin Anderson on July 18, 1992.

== Oklahoma House of Representatives ==
=== 2022 election ===
Tedford was elected to the Oklahoma House of Representatives after running unopposed to succeed retiring Representative Sheila Dills in the 2022 Oklahoma House of Representatives election. He was sworn in on November 16, 2022.

=== Tenure ===
Prior to his first legislative session, Tedford advocated for an increase in teacher pay by arguing current wages were not competitive in the Oklahoma jobs market. He was endorsed for re-election by Kevin Hern in September 2023.

== 2026 Congressional campaign ==
On March 11, 2026, Tedford announced that he would be a candidate for the United States House of Representatives.

In the general election, Tedford defeated Democrat John Croisant to become representative-elect for Oklahoma's 1st congressional district.

== Electoral history ==
2026 Oklahoma's 1st congressional district election
Party	Candidate	Votes	%
Republican	Mark Tedford	121,397	52.30
Democratic	John Croisant	110,707	47.70
Total votes		232,104	100.0
Republican hold			

U.S. House of Representatives
Preceded by Kevin Hern	Member of the U.S. House of Representatives from Oklahoma's 1st congressional district Taking office 2027	Elect
