= Alan Armstrong =

American politician (born 1962)

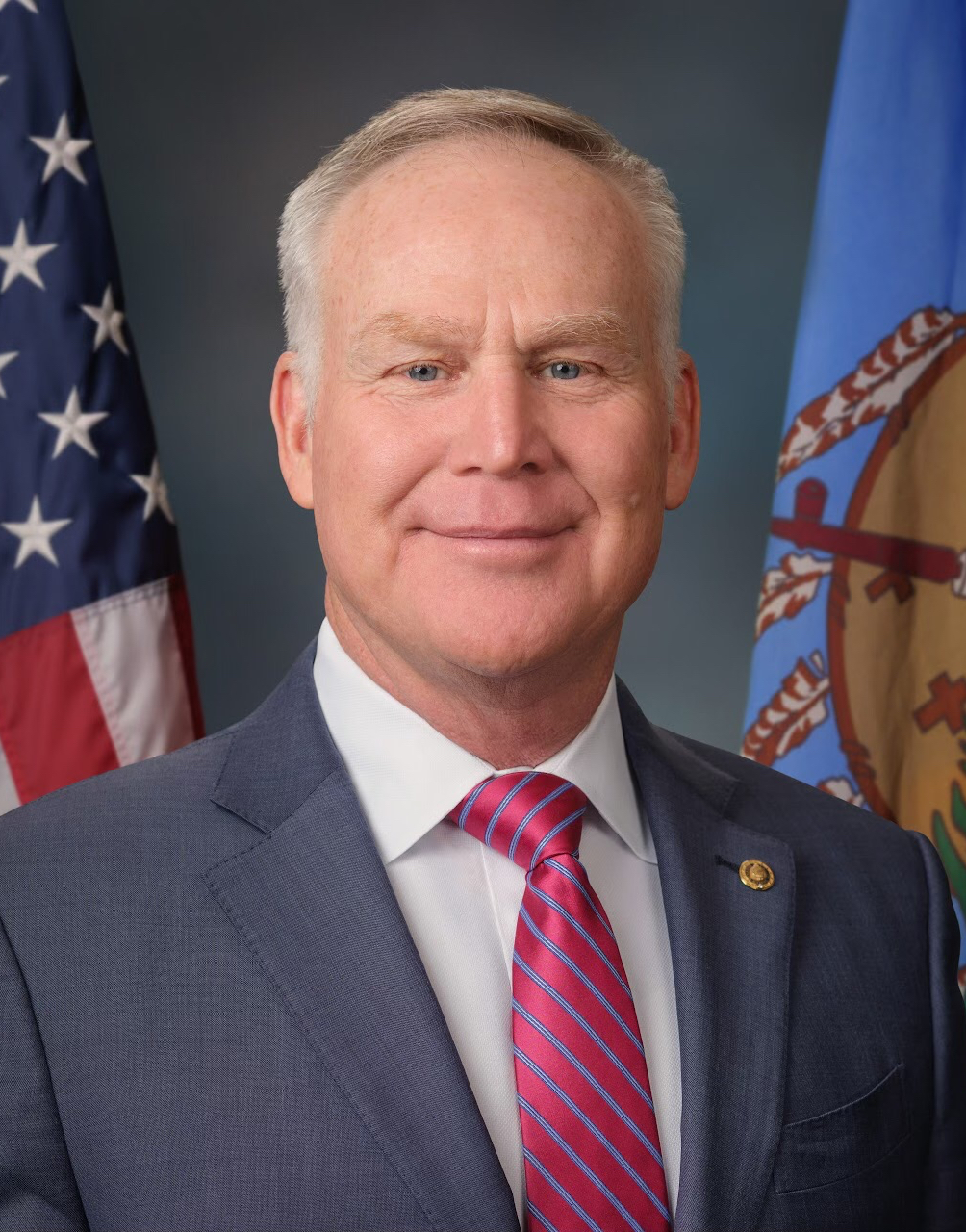
- Official portrait, 2026

United States Senator from Oklahoma
- Incumbent
- Assumed office March 24, 2026 Serving with James Lankford
- Appointed by: Kevin Stitt
- Preceded by: Markwayne Mullin

Personal details
- Born: Alan Stuart Armstrong; July 11, 1962 (age 64) McLennan County, Texas, U.S.
- Party: Republican
- Spouse: Shelly Armstrong
- Children: 4
- Education: University of Oklahoma (BS)
- Website: Senate website
- Armstrong's voice Armstrong's first speech on the Senate floor Recorded July 16, 2026

Alan Stuart Armstrong (born July 11, 1962) is an American politician and businessman serving as the junior United States senator from Oklahoma, a seat he has held since March 2026. A member of the Republican Party, he served from 2011 to 2025 as the CEO of the oil and gas company Williams.

Governor Kevin Stitt appointed Armstrong to the Senate after Markwayne Mullin resigned to become secretary of homeland security. Armstrong had never held office before his appointment. Under Oklahoma law, he is ineligible to run for a full term in 2026.

== Early life ==
Alan Stuart Armstrong was born on July 11, 1962, in McLennan County, Texas. He was raised in Bartlesville, Oklahoma, where he graduated from Sooner High School. Both of his grandfathers, one grandmother, an uncle, and his parents worked for Phillips Petroleum.

== Career ==
Armstrong graduated from the University of Oklahoma with a bachelor's degree in civil engineering in 1985 and in 1986 started working as an engineer for the Williams Companies, an oil and gas company. He served as CEO and executive board chairman of Williams from 2011 to 2025. Armstrong also served as vice president of gathering and processing from 1999 to 2002; vice president of commercial development from 1998 to 1999; vice president of retail energy services from 1997 to 1998; and director of commercial operations for the company's Gulf Coast midstream operations from 1995 to 1997. Since January 2026, he has served as a director of Constellation Energy.

After the January 6 United States Capitol attack, Armstrong donated $5,800 to U.S. Representative Adam Kinzinger, a Republican who voted to impeach President Donald Trump in the attack's aftermath. Armstrong has also donated to the campaigns of senators John Barrasso, Tim Sheehy, Shelley Moore Capito, Mike Crapo, Josh Hawley, James Lankford, Joe Manchin, and Heidi Heitkamp.

In August 2022, President Joe Biden appointed Armstrong to the National Infrastructure Advisory Council.

== U.S. Senate ==
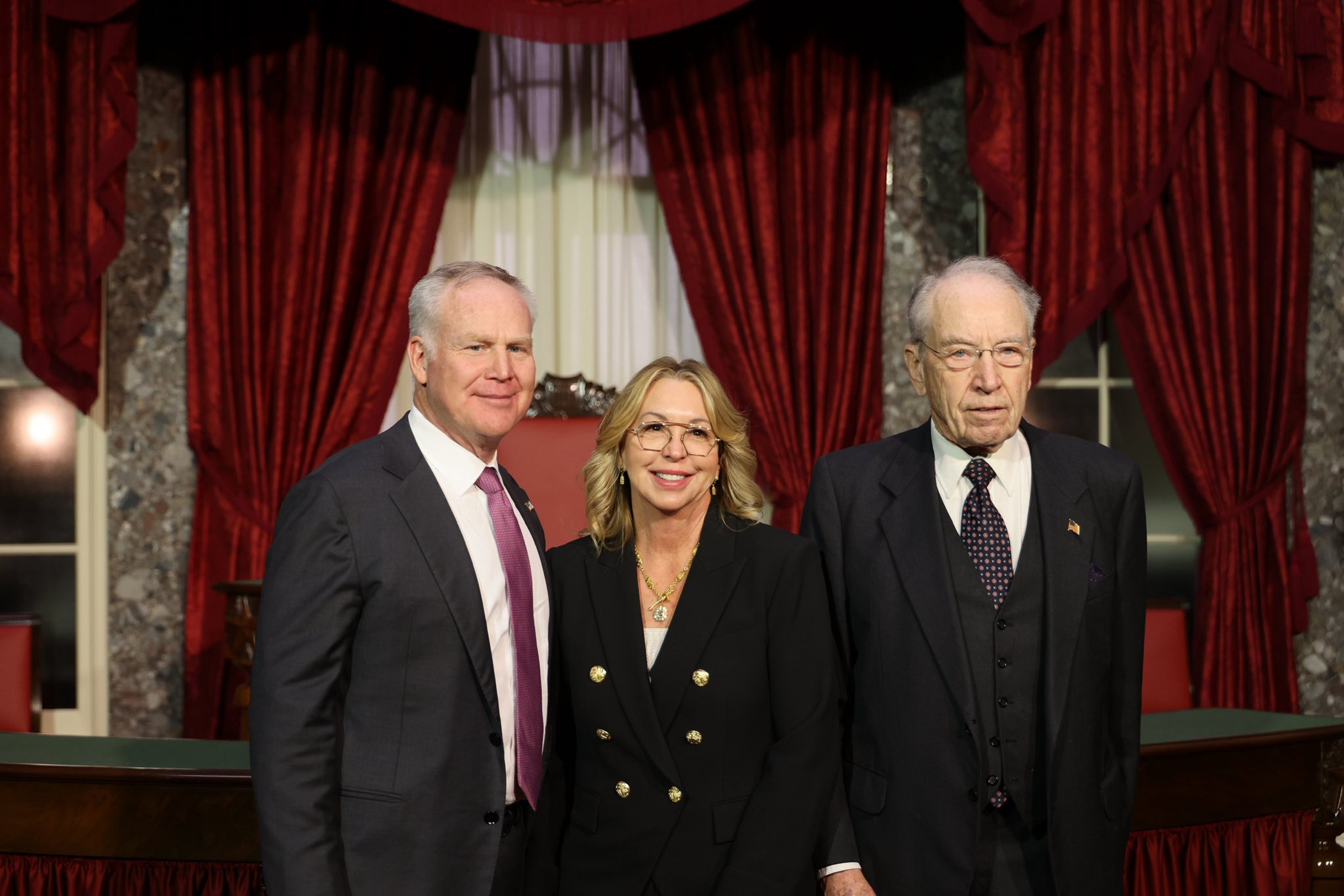
Armstrong during his swearing-in to the U.S. Senate by Chuck Grassley.

=== Appointment ===
On March 21, 2026, NOTUS reported that Governor Kevin Stitt would appoint Armstrong to the U.S. Senate after President Trump nominated incumbent senator Markwayne Mullin for secretary of homeland security. On March 24, Armstrong was formally announced as Stitt's choice for the appointment.

=== Tenure ===
Armstrong was sworn in on March 24, 2026, by Senate president pro tempore Chuck Grassley. Per Oklahoma law, Armstrong is ineligible to run for reelection.

Armstrong has leaned on his background as an energy executive to draw attention to federal permitting reform. In June 2026, he joined a bipartisan Senate delegation to Ukraine.

On June 24, 2026, Armstrong introduced energy project permitting reform aimed to make it faster and easier to approve energy, pipeline, and mining projects by streamlining federal permitting and environmental reviews.

== Personal life ==
Armstrong lives in Tulsa with his wife, Shelly, and their four children.

U.S. Senate
Preceded by Markwayne Mullin	U.S. Senator (Class 2) from Oklahoma; 2026–present Served alongside: James Lankford	Incumbent
U.S. order of precedence (ceremonial)
Preceded by Ashley Moody	United States senators by seniority 99th	Succeeded by Darline Graham
