= 2024 United States House of Representatives elections in Oklahoma =

- November 5, 2024

All 5 Oklahoma seats to the United States House of Representatives
	Majority party	Minority party
Party	Republican	Democratic
Last election	5	0
Seats won	5	0
Seat change	Steady	Steady
Popular vote	834,553	397,829
Percentage	65.09%	31.02%
Swing	▼1.27%	▼0.12%
- Republican 50–60% 60–70% 70–80% 80–90% >90%

The 2024 United States House of Representatives elections in Oklahoma were held on November 5, 2024, to elect the five U.S. representatives from the State of Oklahoma, one from each of the state's congressional districts. The primary elections for the Republican, Democratic, and Libertarian parties' nominations took place on June 18, 2024. All candidates had to file between the days of April 3–5, 2024.

The elections were part of the 2024 Oklahoma elections and coincided with the 2024 U.S. presidential election, as well as other elections to the House of Representatives, elections to the United States Senate, and various state and local elections.

== District 1 ==
2024 Oklahoma's 1st congressional district election
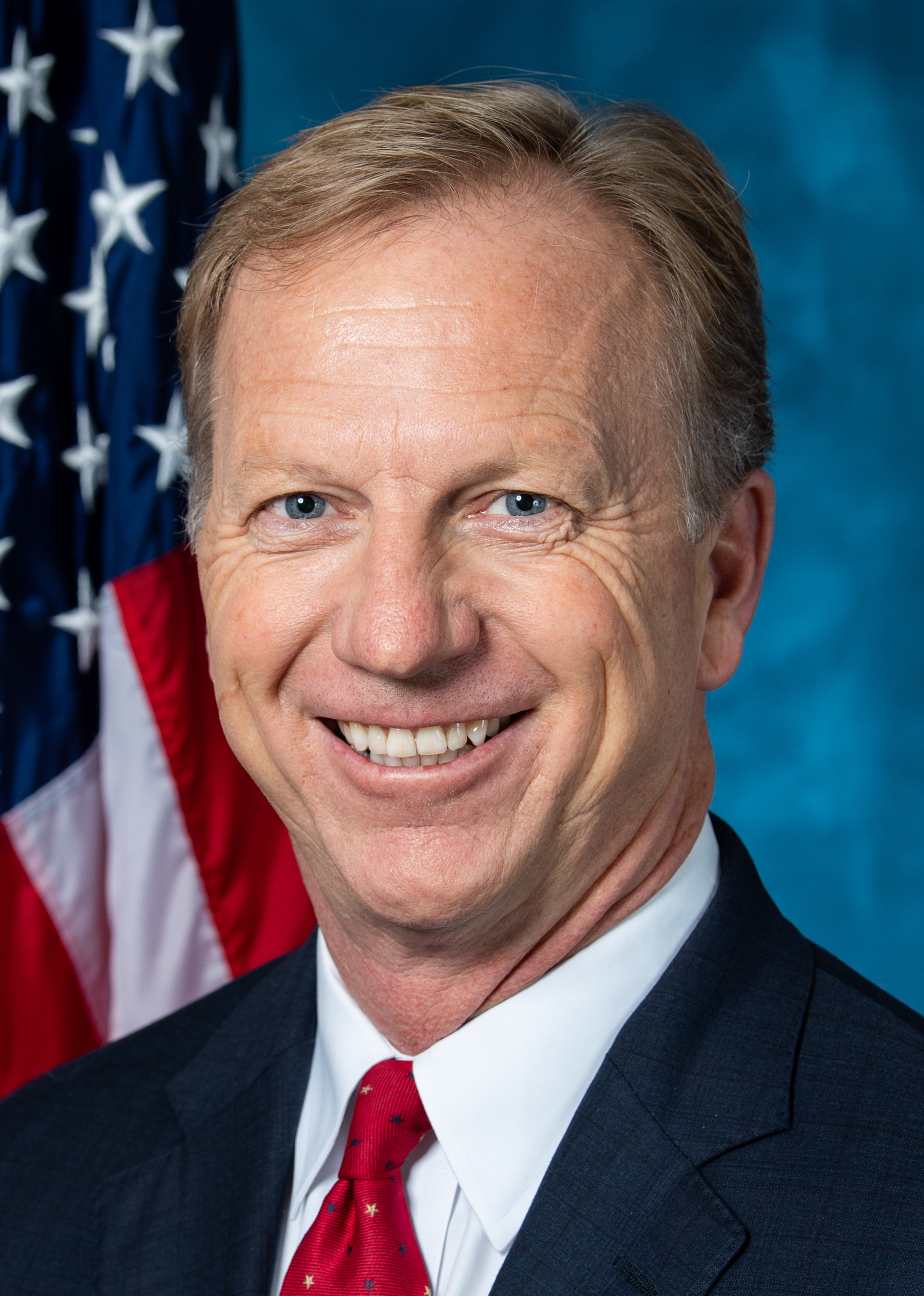

Nominee	Kevin Hern	Dennis Baker	Mark Sanders
Party	Republican	Democratic	Independent
Popular vote	188,832	107,903	15,766
Percentage	60.43%	34.53%	5.05%
- Hern: 40–50% 50–60% 60–70% 70–80% 80–90% >90% Baker: 40–50% 50–60% 60–70% 70–80% 80–90%
U.S. Representative before election
Kevin Hern
Republican
Elected U.S. Representative
Kevin Hern
Republican

The incumbent was Republican Kevin Hern, who was re-elected with 61.16% of the vote in 2022.

=== Republican primary ===
==== Nominee ====
- Kevin Hern, incumbent U.S. representative

==== Eliminated in primary ====
- Paul Royse, former police officer and perennial candidate

==== Fundraising ====
Campaign finance reports as of May 29, 2024
Candidate	Raised	Spent	Cash on hand
Kevin Hern (R)	$1,583,828	$1,684,176	$592,252
Source: Federal Election Commission

==== Results ====
Republican primary results
Party	Candidate	Votes	%
Republican	Kevin Hern (incumbent)	30,244	87.0
Republican	Paul Royse	4,504	13.0
Total votes		34,748	100.0

=== Democratic primary ===
==== Nominee ====
- Dennis Baker, attorney, former FBI agent, and candidate for U.S. Senate in 2022

==== Eliminated in primary ====
- Evelyn Rogers, librarian and perennial candidate

==== Fundraising ====
Campaign finance reports as of May 29, 2024
Candidate	Raised	Spent	Cash on hand
Dennis Baker (D)	$90,961 (Note: $10,000 of this total was self-funded by Baker.)	$62,401	$14,112
Evelyn Rodgers (D)	$1,340	$1,340	$0
Source: Federal Election Commission

==== Results ====
Democratic primary results
Party	Candidate	Votes	%
Democratic	Dennis Baker	8,527	59.2
Democratic	Evelyn Rogers	5,871	40.8
Total votes		14,398	100.0

=== Independents ===
==== Declared ====
- Mark Sanders, attorney

==== Fundraising ====
Campaign finance reports as of May 29, 2024
Candidate	Raised	Spent	Cash on hand
Mark Sanders (I)	$40,515 (Note: $4,000 of this total was self-funded by Sanders.)	$14,243	$28,902
Source: Federal Election Commission

==== Endorsements ====
Dennis Baker (D)

Newspapers

- Tulsa World
Kevin Hern (R)

Organizations

- AIPAC
- International Franchise Association
- Oklahoma Farm Bureau
- Pro-Israel America

Newspapers

- Tulsa Beacon
Mark Sanders (I)

Political parties

- Forward Party

=== General election ===
==== Predictions ====
Source	Ranking	As of
The Cook Political Report	Solid R	February 2, 2023
Inside Elections	Solid R	March 10, 2023
Sabato's Crystal Ball	Safe R	February 23, 2023
Elections Daily	Safe R	October 26, 2023
CNalysis	Solid R	November 16, 2023
Decision Desk HQ	Solid R	June 1, 2024

==== Results ====
2024 Oklahoma's 1st congressional district election results
Party	Candidate	Votes	%
Republican	Kevin Hern (incumbent)	188,832	60.43%
Democratic	Dennis Baker	107,903	34.53%
Independent	Mark Sanders	15,766	5.05%
Total votes		312,501	100%
Republican hold			

== District 2 ==
2024 Oklahoma's 2nd congressional district election
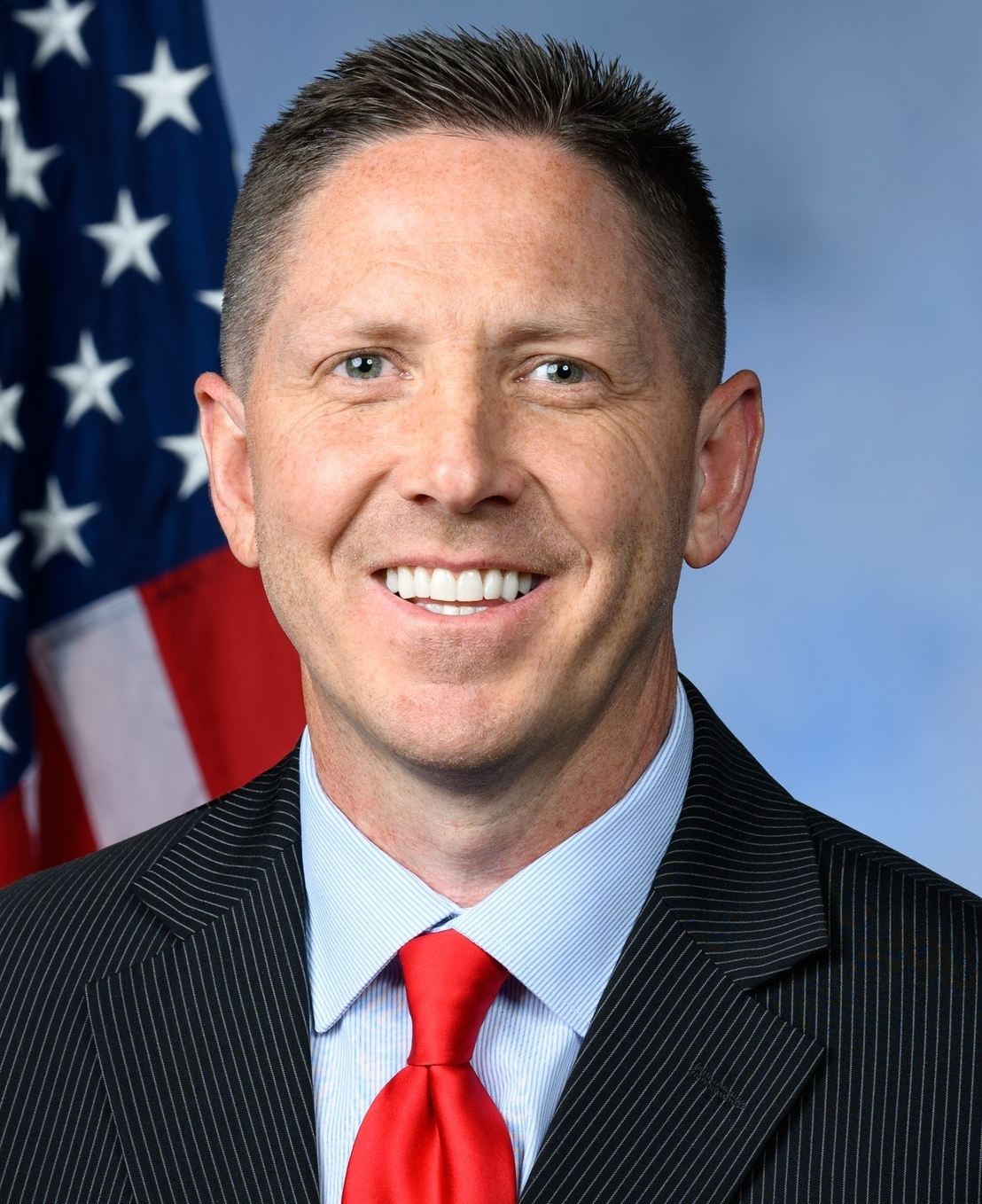

Nominee	Josh Brecheen	Brandon Wade
Party	Republican	Democratic
Popular vote	238,123	68,841
Percentage	74.2%	21.4%
- Brecheen: 40–50% 50–60% 60–70% 70–80% 80–90% >90% Wade: 40–50% 50–60% 60–70% 70–80%
U.S. Representative before election
Josh Brecheen
Republican
Elected U.S. Representative
Josh Brecheen
Republican

The incumbent was Republican Josh Brecheen, who was elected with 72.45% of the vote in 2022.

=== General election ===
==== Candidates ====
- Josh Brecheen, incumbent U.S. representative (Republican)
- Ronnie Hopkins, pastor (Independent)
- Brandon Wade, machinery assembler and candidate for U.S. Senate in 2022 (Democratic)

==== Endorsements ====
Josh Brecheen (R)

Organizations

- AIPAC
- Oklahoma Farm Bureau
Brandon Wade (D)

Organizations

- Center for Free Thought Equality PAC

==== Fundraising ====
Campaign finance reports as of May 29, 2024
Candidate	Raised	Spent	Cash on hand
Josh Brecheen (R)	$224,694	$232,822	$65,711
Brandon Wade (D)	$3,467	$4,222	$199
Source: Federal Election Commission

==== Predictions ====
Source	Ranking	As of
The Cook Political Report	Solid R	February 2, 2023
Inside Elections	Solid R	March 10, 2023
Sabato's Crystal Ball	Safe R	February 23, 2023
Elections Daily	Safe R	October 26, 2023
CNalysis	Solid R	November 16, 2023
Decision Desk HQ	Solid R	June 1, 2024

==== Results ====
2024 Oklahoma's 2nd congressional district election results
Party	Candidate	Votes	%
Republican	Josh Brecheen (incumbent)	238,123	74.18%
Democratic	Brandon Wade	68,841	21.44%
Independent	Ronnie Hopkins	14,061	4.38%
Total votes		321,025	100%
Republican hold			

== District 3 ==
2024 Oklahoma's 3rd congressional district Republican primary election
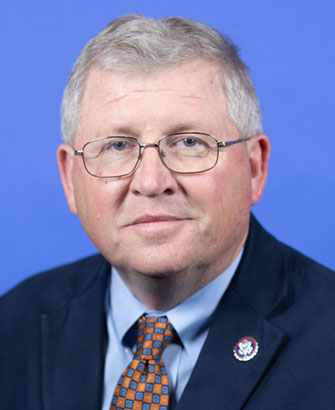

Nominee	Frank Lucas	Darren Hamilton	Robin Carter
Party	Republican	Republican	Republican
Popular vote	37,158	7,087	6,651
Percentage	73.0%	13.9%	13.1%
- Lucas : 40–50% 50–60% 60–70% 70–80% 80–90% >90% Hamilton: 50–60% 60–70% Carter: >90% Tie: 40–50% No Votes
U.S. Representative before election
Frank Lucas
Republican
Elected U.S. Representative
Frank Lucas
Republican

The incumbent was Republican Frank Lucas, who was re-elected with 74.54% of the vote in 2022.

=== Republican primary ===
==== Nominee ====
- Frank Lucas, incumbent U.S. representative

==== Eliminated in primary ====
- Robin Carder, healthcare consultant
- Darren Hamilton, satellite engineer

==== Endorsements ====
Frank Lucas

Organizations

- AIPAC
- ClearPath Action Fund
- Oklahoma Farm Bureau

==== Fundraising ====
Campaign finance reports as of May 29, 2024
Candidate	Raised	Spent	Cash on hand
Robin Carder (R)	$18,824 (Note: $8,352 of this total was self-funded by Carder.)	$17,847	$977
Frank Lucas (R)	$1,186,512	$637,926	$728,281
Darren Hamilton (R)	$4,902	$5,322	$555
Source: Federal Election Commission

==== Predictions ====
Source	Ranking	As of
The Cook Political Report	Solid R	February 2, 2023
Inside Elections	Solid R	March 10, 2023
Sabato's Crystal Ball	Safe R	February 23, 2023
Elections Daily	Safe R	October 26, 2023
CNalysis	Solid R	November 16, 2023
Decision Desk HQ	Solid R	June 1, 2024

==== Results ====
Republican primary results
Party	Candidate	Votes	%
Republican	Frank Lucas (incumbent)	37,158	73.0
Republican	Darren Hamilton	7,087	13.9
Republican	Robin Carder	6,651	13.1
Total votes		50,896	100.0

== District 4 ==
2024 Oklahoma's 4th congressional district election
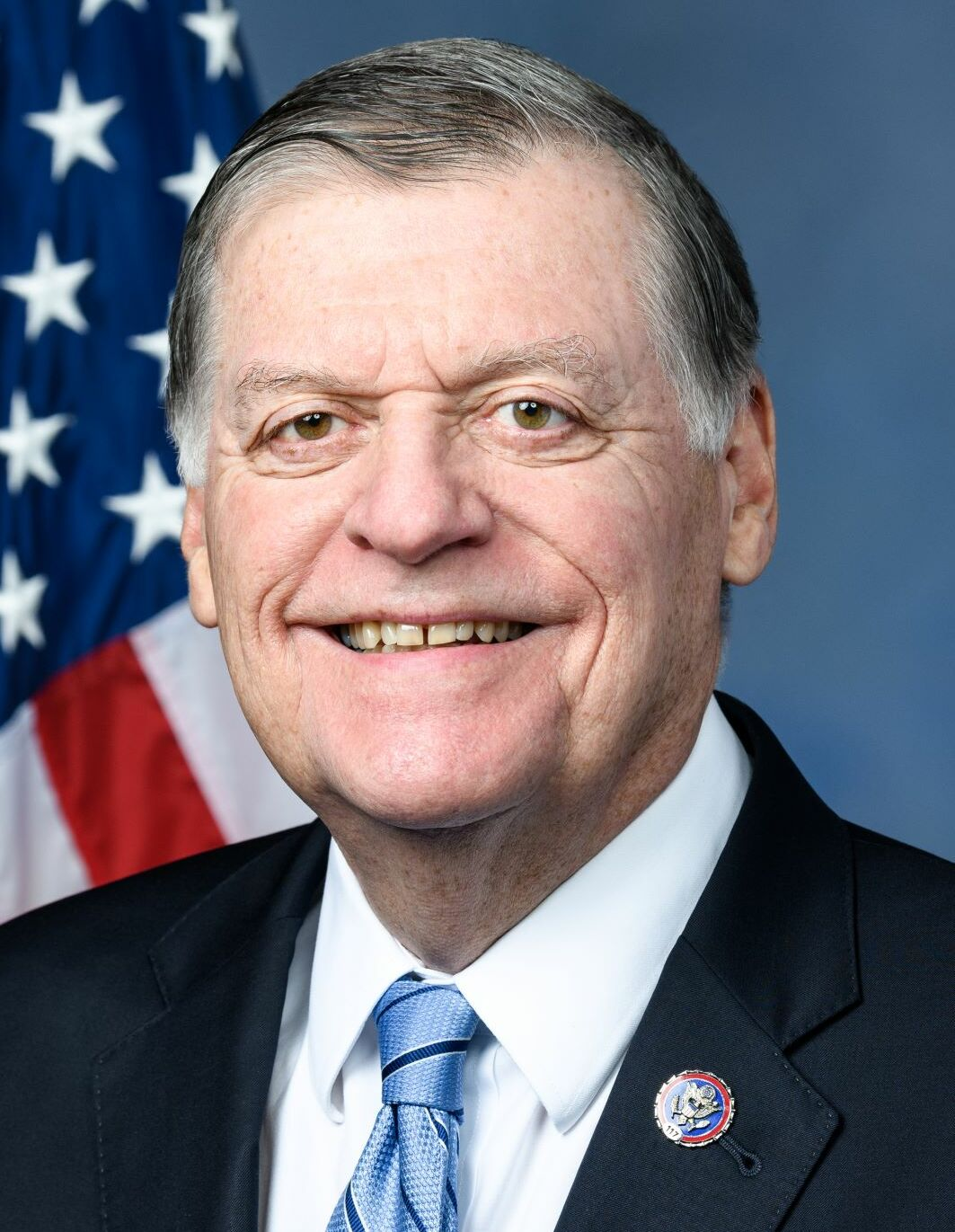

Nominee	Tom Cole	Mary Brannon	James Stacy
Party	Republican	Democratic	Independent
Popular vote	199,962	86,641	19,870
Percentage	65.3%	28.3%	6.5%
- Cole: 40–50% 50–60% 60–70% 70–80% 80–90% >90% Brannon: 40–50% 50–60% 60–70% 70–80%
U.S. Representative before election
Tom Cole
Republican
Elected U.S. Representative
Tom Cole
Republican

The incumbent was Republican Tom Cole, who was re-elected with 66.75% of the vote in 2022.

=== Republican primary ===
==== Nominee ====
- Tom Cole, incumbent U.S. representative

==== Eliminated in primary ====
- Paul Bondar, insurance agency owner
- Nick Hankins, IT professional
- Rick Harris
- Andrew Hayes, farmer and rancher

==== Endorsements ====
Paul Bondar

Statewide officials

- Ryan Walters, Oklahoma Superintendent of Public Instruction (2023–present)
Tom Cole

Executive branch officials

- Donald Trump, former president of the United States (2017–2021)

Organizations

- AIPAC
- International Franchise Association
- National Right to Life Committee
- Oklahoma Farm Bureau
- Pro-Israel America
- Republican Jewish Coalition

==== Fundraising ====
Campaign finance reports as of May 29, 2024
Candidate	Raised	Spent	Cash on hand
Paul Bondar (R)	$5,151,650 (Note: $5,107,245 of this total was self-funded by Bondar.)	$4,886,841	$264,809
Tom Cole (R)	$3,196,257	$3,107,384	$1,303,788
Source: Federal Election Commission

==== Results ====
Republican primary results
Party	Candidate	Votes	%
Republican	Tom Cole (incumbent)	40,393	64.6
Republican	Paul Bondar	16,127	25.8
Republican	Andrew Hayes	2,551	4.1
Republican	Rick Harris	2,171	3.5
Republican	Nick Hankins	1,257	2.0
Total votes		62,499	100.0

=== Democratic primary ===
==== Nominee ====
- Mary Brannon, retired teacher and nominee for this district in 2018, 2020, and 2022

==== Eliminated in primary ====
- Kody Macaulay, IT specialist

==== Fundraising ====
Campaign finance reports as of May 29, 2024
Candidate	Raised	Spent	Cash on hand
Kody Macaulay (D)	$23,715 (Note: $4,000 of this total was self-funded by Macaulay.)	$21,479	$2,235
Source: Federal Election Commission

==== Results ====
Democratic primary results
Party	Candidate	Votes	%
Democratic	Mary Brannon	8,532	60.7
Democratic	Kody Macaulay	5,530	39.3
Total votes		14,062	100.0

=== Independents ===
==== Declared ====
- James Stacy, marijuana legalization activist

=== General election ===
==== Predictions ====
Source	Ranking	As of
The Cook Political Report	Solid R	February 2, 2023
Inside Elections	Solid R	March 10, 2023
Sabato's Crystal Ball	Safe R	February 23, 2023
Elections Daily	Safe R	October 26, 2023
CNalysis	Solid R	November 16, 2023
Decision Desk HQ	Solid R	June 1, 2024

==== Results ====
2024 Oklahoma's 4th congressional district election results
Party	Candidate	Votes	%
Republican	Tom Cole (incumbent)	199,962	65.25%
Democratic	Mary Brannon	86,641	28.27%
Independent	James Stacy	19,870	6.48%
Total votes		306,473	100%
Republican hold			

== District 5 ==
2024 Oklahoma's 5th congressional district election
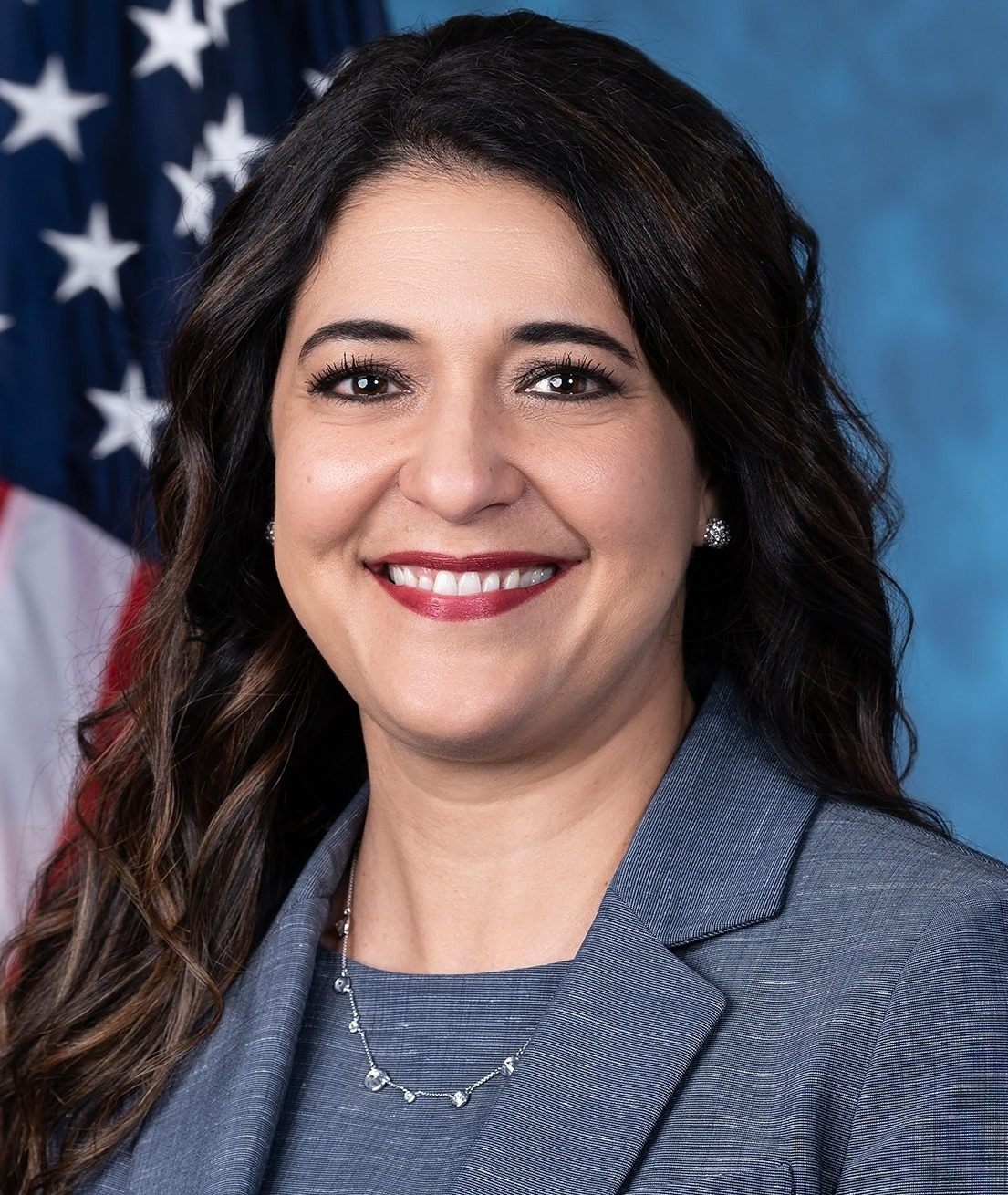

Nominee	Stephanie Bice	Madison Horn
Party	Republican	Democratic
Popular vote	207,636	134,471
Percentage	60.7%	39.3%
- Bice: 50–60% 60–70% 70–80% 80–90% >90% Horn: 50–60% 60–70% 70–80% 80–90% >90%
U.S. Representative before election
Stephanie Bice
Republican
Elected U.S. Representative
Stephanie Bice
Republican

The incumbent was Republican Stephanie Bice, who was re-elected with 59.0% of the vote in 2022.

=== General election ===
==== Candidates ====
- Stephanie Bice, incumbent U.S. representative (Republican)
- Madison Horn, cybersecurity executive and nominee for U.S. Senate in 2022 (Democratic)

==== Endorsements ====
Stephanie Bice (R)

Organizations

- AIPAC
- Log Cabin Republicans PAC
- Maggie's List
- Oklahoma Farm Bureau
- Pro-Israel America
Madison Horn (D)

U.S. representatives

- Lois Frankel, U.S. representative from Florida (2013–present)

Organizations

- National Women's Political Caucus

==== Fundraising ====
Campaign finance reports as of May 29, 2024
Candidate	Raised	Spent	Cash on hand
Stephanie Bice (R)	$1,405,243	$788,710	$1,238,147
Madison Horn (D)	$277,880	$225,502	$52,542
Source: Federal Election Commission

==== Predictions ====
Source	Ranking	As of
The Cook Political Report	Solid R	February 2, 2023
Inside Elections	Solid R	March 10, 2023
Sabato's Crystal Ball	Safe R	February 23, 2023
Elections Daily	Safe R	October 26, 2023
CNalysis	Solid R	November 16, 2023
Decision Desk HQ	Solid R	June 1, 2024

==== Results ====
2024 Oklahoma's 5th congressional district election results
Party	Candidate	Votes	%
Republican	Stephanie Bice (incumbent)	207,636	60.69%
Democratic	Madison Horn	134,471	39.31%
Total votes		342,107	100%
Republican hold			
