= Tom Cole =

American politician (born 1949)

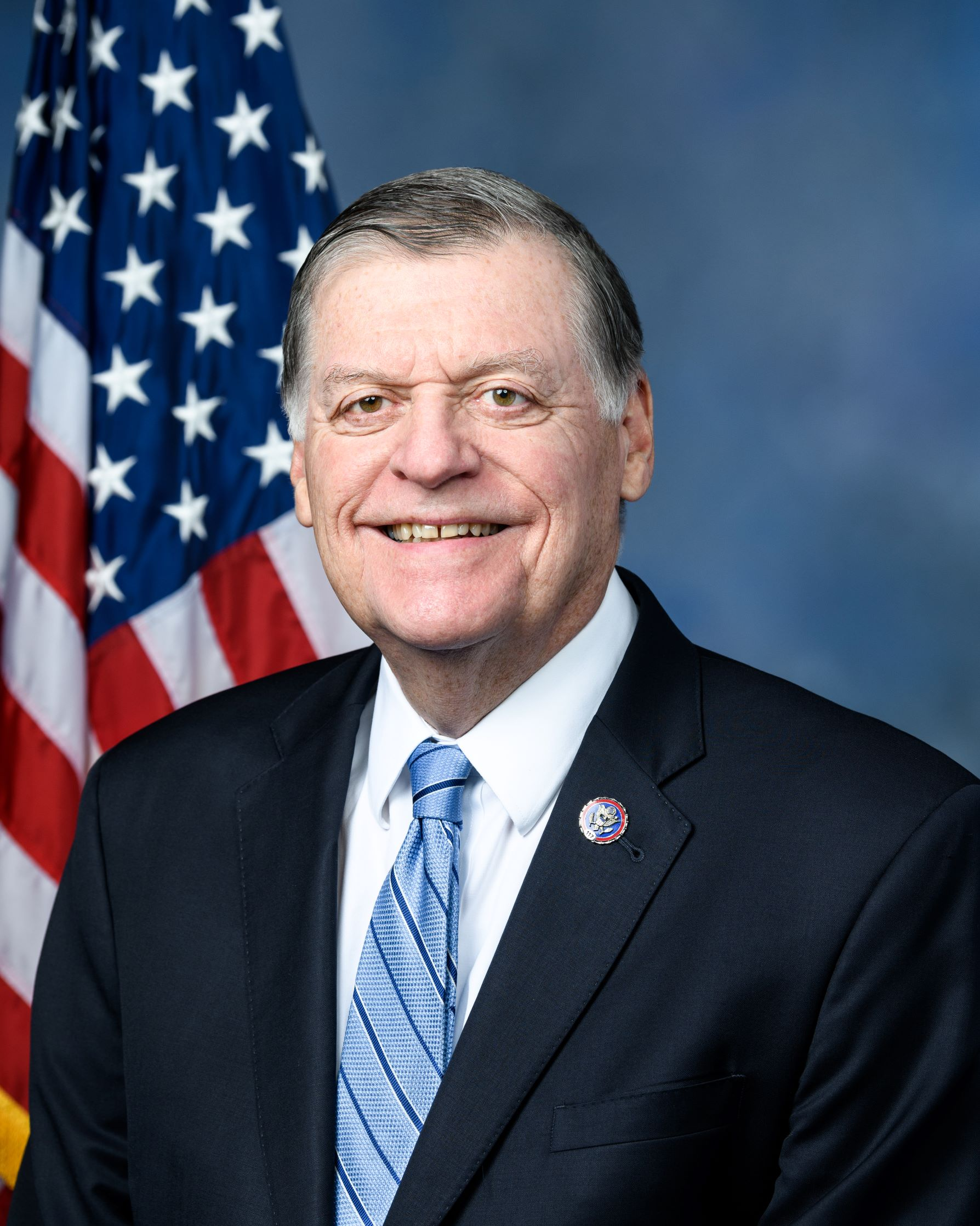
- Official portrait, 2021

Chair of the House Appropriations Committee
- Incumbent
- Assumed office April 10, 2024
- Preceded by: Kay Granger

Chair of the House Rules Committee
- In office January 3, 2023 – April 10, 2024
- Preceded by: Jim McGovern
- Succeeded by: Michael C. Burgess

Ranking Member of the House Rules Committee
- In office January 3, 2019 – January 3, 2023
- Preceded by: Jim McGovern
- Succeeded by: Jim McGovern

Chair of the National Republican Congressional Committee
- In office January 3, 2007 – January 3, 2009
- Leader: John Boehner
- Preceded by: Tom Reynolds
- Succeeded by: Pete Sessions

Member of the U.S. House of Representatives from Oklahoma's 4th district
- Incumbent
- Assumed office January 3, 2003
- Preceded by: J. C. Watts

26th Secretary of State of Oklahoma
- In office January 9, 1995 – March 16, 1999
- Governor: Frank Keating
- Preceded by: Glo Henley
- Succeeded by: Mike Hunter

Member of the Oklahoma Senate from the 45th district
- In office November 1988 – July 1991
- Preceded by: Helen Cole
- Succeeded by: Helen Cole

Personal details
- Born: Thomas Jeffery Cole; April 28, 1949 (age 77) Shreveport, Louisiana, U.S.
- Citizenship: American; Chickasaw Nation
- Party: Republican
- Spouse: Ellen Decker (m. 1971)
- Children: 1
- Relatives: Helen Cole (mother); Te Ata (great-aunt)
- Education: Grinnell College (BA); Yale University (MA); University of Oklahoma (PhD)
- Website: House website Campaign website

Academic background
- Thesis: Life and Labor in the Isle of Dogs: The Origins and Evolution of an East London Working-Class Community, 1800–1980 (1984)
- Cole's voice Cole supporting various FY2019 spending bills under consideration. Recorded September 26, 2018

Thomas Jeffery Cole (born April 28, 1949) is an American politician and former educator serving as the U.S. representative for Oklahoma's 4th congressional district since 2003. A Republican, he previously served in the Oklahoma Senate from 1988 to 1991 and as the 26th secretary of state of Oklahoma from 1995 to 1999. An enrolled member of the Chickasaw Nation, Cole is the longest-serving Native American in the history of Congress. On April 10, 2024, Cole was elected chair of the House Appropriations Committee.

== Early life, education, and academic career ==
Cole was born in Shreveport, Louisiana, the son of John D. Cole and Helen Te Ata (née Gale); the latter was the first Native American elected to the Oklahoma Senate. Cole is an enrolled member of the Chickasaw Nation. He has said, "I was raised to think of myself as Native American and, most importantly, as Chickasaw." Cole has said that a great-aunt of his was the Native American storyteller Te Ata.

A fifth-generation Oklahoman, Cole lived in various locations during his childhood due to his father's military background. His family returned to Oklahoma when he was in sixth grade. He graduated from Moore High School in 1967 and from Grinnell College in 1971. His postgraduate degrees include an MA from Yale University (1974) and a PhD from the University of Oklahoma (1984), both in British history. Cole's PhD thesis was Life and Labor in the Isle of Dogs: The Origins and Evolution of an East London Working-Class Community, 1800–1980. He did research abroad as a Thomas J. Watson Fellow and was a Fulbright Fellow (1977–78) at the University of London. He served as an assistant professor of history and politics before winning political office.

== Early political career ==
Cole worked on the staff of U.S. Rep. Mickey Edwards of Oklahoma from 1982 to 1984. He chaired the Oklahoma Republican Party from 1985 to 1989. Cole served in the Oklahoma Senate from 1988 to 1991. He was the executive director of the National Republican Congressional Committee from 1991 to 1993.

From 1995 to 1999, he served as Oklahoma's secretary of state, appointed by Governor Frank Keating. He assisted with the recovery efforts after the 1995 Oklahoma City bombing. Cole resigned from Keating's administration when asked to become chief of staff to the Republican National Committee. Cole served in that role from 1999 to 2001.

== U.S. House of Representatives ==
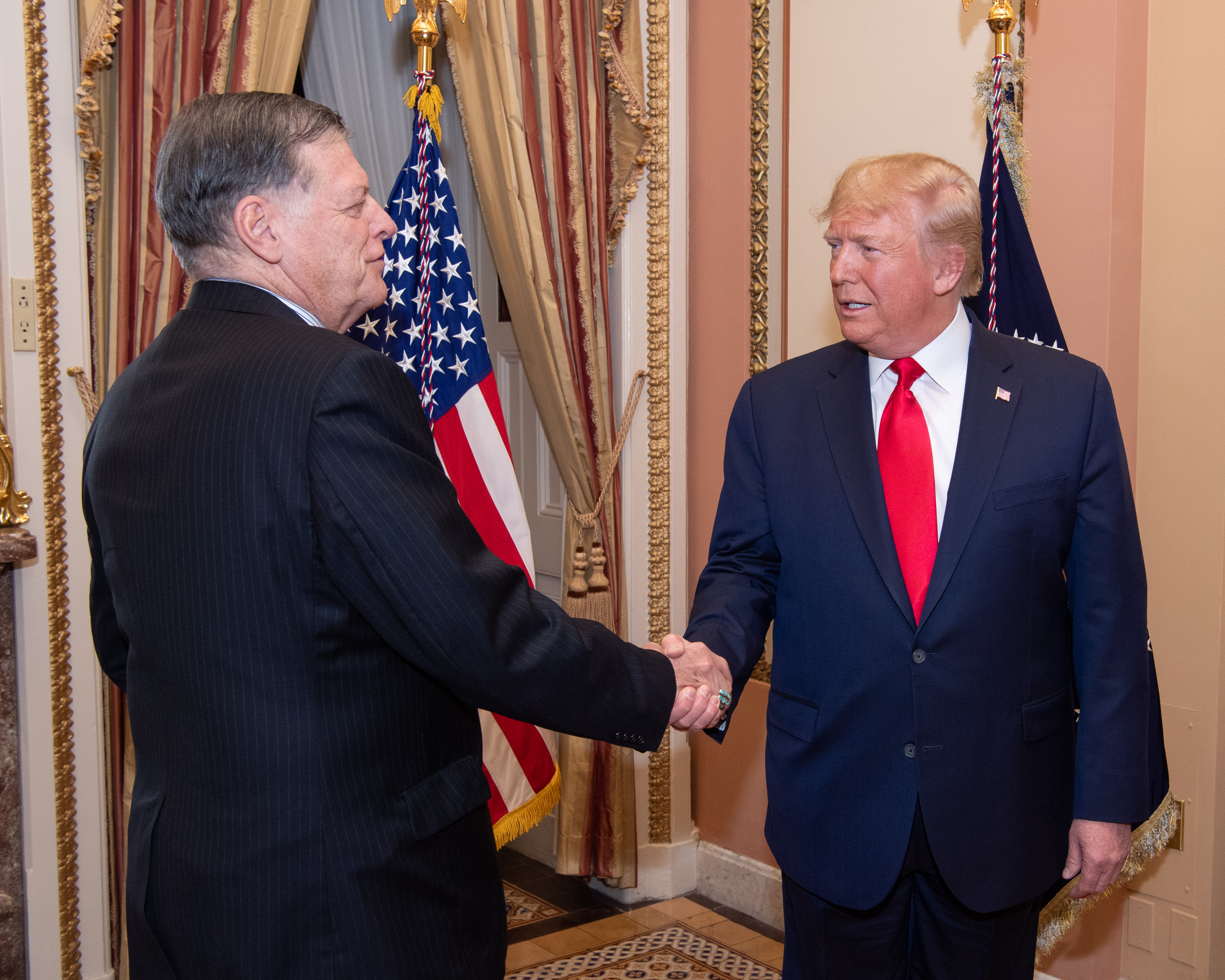
Cole shaking hands with President Donald Trump in February 2020

=== Elections ===
Cole was first elected to Congress in 2002. During his initial campaign for the House of Representatives, Cole received the endorsement of Watts, the popular outgoing congressman. This helped him win the general election over Democratic nominee and former Oklahoma State Senator Darryl Roberts, with 53.8% of the vote to Roberts's 46.1%. Cole has won at least 63% of the vote in each of his eight reelection campaigns, and he ran unopposed in 2010.

In 2024, Cole won the Republican primary against four challengers, including Paul Bondar, Nick Hankins, Andrew Hayes, and Rick Whitebear-Harris.

In 2026, Cole defeated former marketing and newspaper employee Marcie Everhart in the Republican primary. He won the general election against Democratic nominee Mitchell Jacob, receiving 58% of the vote.

=== Tenure ===
Following the 2006 election cycle, the members of the House Republican Conference elected Cole to the post of NRCC chairman, placing him in charge of national efforts to assist Republican candidates for Congress.

Cole has established a conservative voting record in the House. He has consistently voted anti-abortion and for gun rights. He holds pro-business views and supports free trade, the military, and veterans. Another one of his priorities is educating other members of Congress on American Indian issues. He favors loosening immigration restrictions and imposing stricter limits on campaign funds. In 2012, he sponsored H.R. 5912, which would prohibit public funds from being used for political party conventions. This legislation passed the House in September, but died in the Senate. During his tenure, Cole has been a leading voice for strengthening protections for Native American women under the Violence Against Women Act.

In June 2013, after another failure of the United States farm bill in Congress, Cole called the failure inexcusable. His district in Oklahoma includes some of the state's farming communities, and if the Farm Bill passed, it would have saved $40 billion over a ten-year period.

As chair of the House Appropriations Subcommittee on the Legislative Branch, Cole was responsible for introducing the Legislative Branch Appropriations Act, 2015 (H.R. 4487; 113th Congress). The bill would appropriate $3.3 billion to the legislative branch for FY 2015, about the same amount it received in FY 2014. According to Cole, the bill meets its goals "in both an effective and efficient manner, and has done so in a genuinely bipartisan, inclusive and deliberative fashion."

In 2013, Cole introduced the Home School Equity Act for Tax Relief. The bill would allow some homeschool parents to take tax credits for purchasing classroom materials.

Cole expressed his intention in 2018 to push his Tribal Labor Sovereignty Act into the spending bill as an omnibus. The bill would "make clear that the National Labor Relations Board has no jurisdiction over businesses owned and operated by an Indian tribe and located on tribal land."

On April 10, 2024, Cole was elected chair of the House Appropriations Committee.

The Center for Effective Lawmaking at Vanderbilt University and the University of Virginia ranked him as the third-most effective House Republican in the 119th Congress (2023–25).

=== 2016 House speakership election ===
In the contest for House Speaker that followed the resignation of John Boehner, Cole supported the claims of Paul Ryan, saying:

"Anyone who attacks Paul Ryan as being insufficiently conservative is either woefully misinformed or maliciously destructive. . . . Paul Ryan has played a major role in advancing the conservative cause and creating the Republican House majority. His critics are not true conservatives. They are radical populists who neither understand nor accept the institutions, procedures, and traditions that are the basis of constitutional governance."

=== Political positions ===
Cole supported President Donald Trump's 2017 executive order to impose a temporary ban on entry to the U.S. to citizens of seven Muslim-majority countries.

In January 2021, Cole voted against the certification of the Electoral College results in the 2020 presidential election. He subsequently voluntarily gave up an honorary degree from Grinnell College. In May 2021, Cole voted against the creation of a bipartisan commission to investigate the January 6 insurrection.

In 2021, Cole joined a majority of Republican representatives in signing onto an amicus brief to overturn Roe v. Wade. Following the Supreme Court's decision to overrule Roe in June 2022, Cole celebrated the outcome, saying in part "not only is this a monumental win for states’ rights, but also the rights of unborn children."

Cole voted to provide Israel with support following October 7 attacks.

==== Iraq ====
In June 2021, Cole was one of forty-nine House Republicans to vote to repeal the AUMF against Iraq.

==== Big Tech ====
In 2022, Cole was one of thirty-nine Republicans to vote for the Merger Filing Fee Modernization Act of 2022, an antitrust package that would crack down on corporations for anti-competitive behavior.

=== Committee memberships ===
- Committee on Appropriations (chair). He is the first Native American and the first Oklahoman to be chair of this committee.

=== Caucus membership ===
- Congressional Caucus on Turkey and Turkish Americans
- Republican Study Committee

== Electoral history ==
Oklahoma's 4th congressional district: Results 2002–2026
Year	Republican	Votes	Pct	Democrat	Votes	Pct	3rd Party	Party	Votes	Pct
2002	Tom Cole	106,452	53.83%	Darryl Roberts	91,322	46.17%				
2004	Tom Cole (incumbent)	198,985	77.77%	(no candidate)			Charlene K. Bradshaw	Independent	56,869	22.23%
2006	Tom Cole (incumbent)	118,266	64.61%	Hal Spake	64,775	35.39%				
2008	Tom Cole (incumbent)	180,080	66.02%	Blake Cummings	79,674	29.21%	David E. Joyce	Independent	13,027	4.78%
2010*	Tom Cole (incumbent)	32,589	77.26%	(no candidate)			RJ Harris	Republican	9,593	22.74%
2012	Tom Cole (incumbent)	176,561	67.89%	Donna Marie Bebo	71,155	27.60%	RJ Harris	Independent	11,725	4.51%
2014	Tom Cole (incumbent)	117,721	70.80%	Bert Smith	40,998	24.66%	Dennis B. Johnson	Independent	7,549	4.54%
2016	Tom Cole (incumbent)	203,942	69.64%	Christina Owen	76,308	26.08%	Sevier White	Libertarian	12,548	4.28%
2018	Tom Cole (incumbent)	149,127	63.07%	Mary Brannon	78,022	33.00%	Ruby Peters	Independent	9,310	3.94%
2020	Tom Cole (incumbent)	213,096	67.80%	Mary Brannon	90,459	28.80%	Bob White	Libertarian	10,803	3.40%
2022	Tom Cole (incumbent)	149,879	66.75%	Mary Brannon	74,667	33.25%				
2024	Tom Cole (incumbent)	199,962	65.25%	Mary Brannon	86,641	28.27%	James Stacy	Independent	19,870	6.48%
2026	Tom Cole (incumbent)	125,631	57.60%	Mitchell Jacob	86,108	39.48%	Rocco Bonacci	Independent	6,389	2.93%

- In 2010, no Democrat or independent candidate filed to run in OK-4. The results printed here are from the Republican primary, where the election was decided.

== Personal life ==
Cole and his wife, Ellen, have one son.

Cole has served on the Smithsonian Institution Board of Regents and on the board of the National Fulbright Association.

He is featured in the play Sliver of a Full Moon by Mary Kathryn Nagle for his role in the reauthorization of the Violence Against Women Act in 2013.

== See also ==
- List of Native Americans in the United States Congress
- List of Native American politicians

Political offices
Preceded by Glo Henley	Secretary of State of Oklahoma; 1995–1999	Succeeded by Mike Hunter
U.S. House of Representatives
Preceded by J. C. Watts	Member of the U.S. House of Representatives from Oklahoma's 4th congressional district 2003–present	Incumbent
Preceded by Jim McGovern	Ranking Member of the House Rules Committee; 2019–2023	Succeeded by Jim McGovern
Preceded by Jim McGovern	Chair of the House Rules Committee; 2023–2024	Succeeded by Michael C. Burgess
Preceded by Kay Granger	Chair of the House Appropriations Committee; 2024–present	Incumbent
Party political offices
Preceded by Thomas Reynolds	Chair of the National Republican Congressional Committee; 2007–2009	Succeeded by Pete Sessions
U.S. order of precedence (ceremonial)
Preceded by John Carter	United States representatives by seniority 38th	Succeeded by Mario Díaz-Balart
Preceded by Linda Sánchez	Order of precedence of the United States	Succeeded by Virginia Foxx
