= Kevin Hern =

American politician (born 1961)

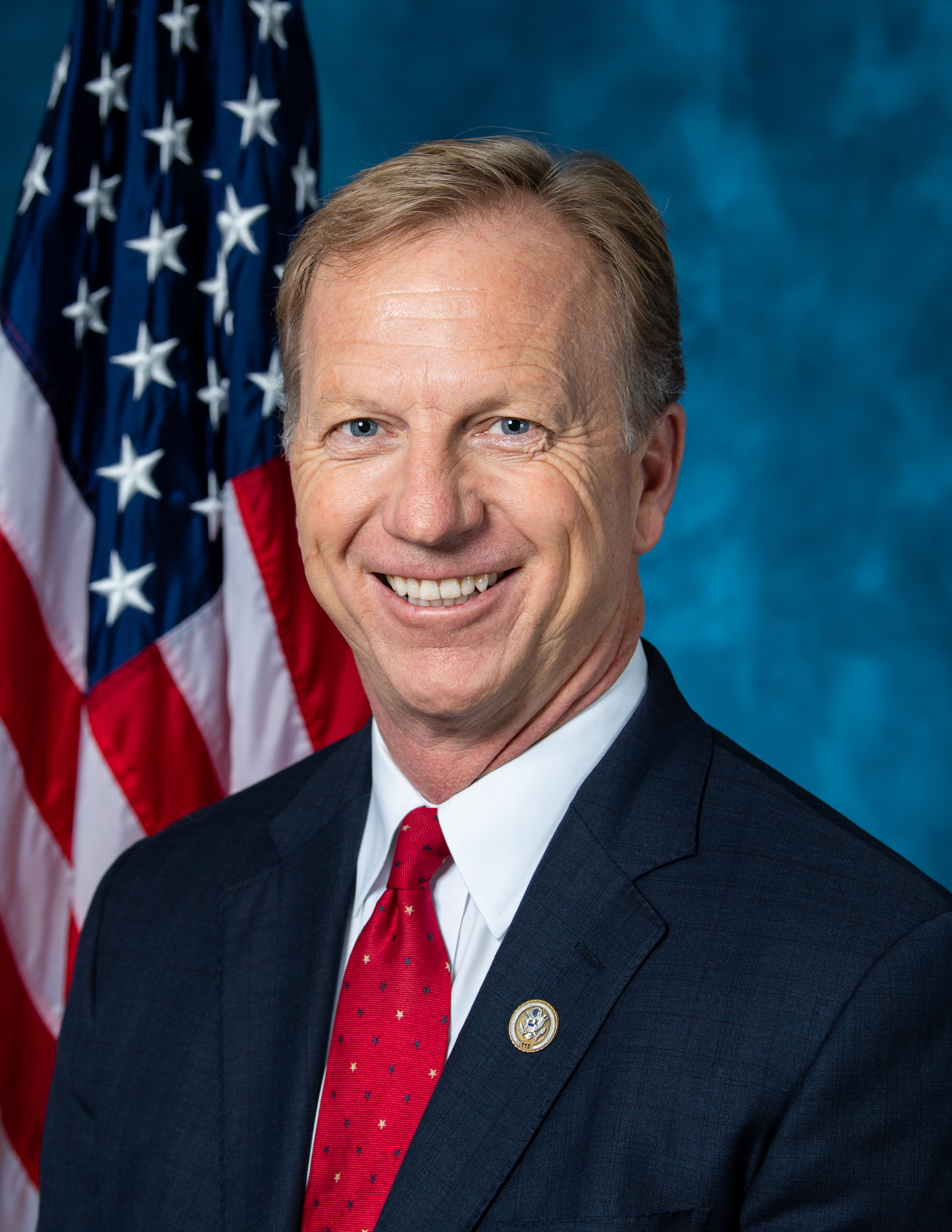
- Official portrait, 2018

United States Senator-elect from Oklahoma
- Assuming office TBD
- Succeeding: Alan Armstrong

Member of the U.S. House of Representatives from Oklahoma's 1st district
- Incumbent
- Assumed office November 6, 2018 (Note: Hern's official service begins on the date of his appointment following the election due to Bridenstine's early resignation, while he was not sworn in until November 13, 2018.)
- Preceded by: Jim Bridenstine
House positions
Chair of the House Republican Policy Committee
In office January 3, 2025 – March 11, 2026
Leader	Mike Johnson
Preceded by	Gary Palmer
Succeeded by	Jay Obernolte
Chair of the Republican Study Committee
In office January 3, 2023 – January 3, 2025
Preceded by	Jim Banks
Succeeded by	August Pfluger

Personal details
- Born: Kevin Ray Hern; December 4, 1961 (age 64) Belton, Missouri, U.S.
- Party: Republican
- Spouse: Tammy Hankens (m. 1994)
- Children: 3
- Education: Arkansas Tech University (BS); Georgia Institute of Technology (attended); University of Arkansas, Little Rock (MBA)
- Website: House website; Campaign website
- Hern's voice Hern on natural disasters in Oklahoma. Recorded June 3, 2019

Kevin Ray Hern (born December 4, 1961) is an American politician and businessman who is a United States senator-elect from Oklahoma. A member of the Republican Party, he has represented Oklahoma's 1st congressional district in the United States House of Representatives since 2018.

Born in Missouri and raised in Pope County, Arkansas, Hern graduated from Arkansas Tech University in 1986 and briefly attended the Georgia Institute of Technology. In 1997 he bought his first McDonald's franchise and in 1999 he earned an MBA degree from the University of Arkansas, Little Rock. After moving to Oklahoma in 1999, Hern expanded his McDonald's franchises, eventually owning 18 in the Tulsa metropolitan area.

Hern was first elected to Congress in 2018 and was reelected in 2020, 2022, and 2024. He became the chair of the Republican Study Committee, a conservative group of Republicans, in 2023. In the January 2023 election for Speaker of the U.S. House of Representatives, Hern was nominated as a protest candidate against Kevin McCarthy. After McCarthy was removed as speaker, Hern was briefly one of the candidates in the October 2023 elections to replace him.

After Senator Markwayne Mullin resigned to become U.S. Secretary of Homeland Security, Hern announced his candidacy for the 2026 United States Senate election in Oklahoma. In November 2026, he was elected with 57.9% of the vote.

== Early life and education ==
Born on an Air Force base in western Missouri, Hern moved to Pope County with his mother, Freda Flansburg, and younger brother after his parents separated. He graduated from Dover High School in 1980 and Arkansas Tech University in 1986 before working at Rockwell International while pursuing a PhD in astronautical engineering at the Georgia Institute of Technology. He left his degree program without finishing after the Challenger disaster in 1986.

Hern received his MBA from the University of Arkansas, Little Rock, in 1999.

== Career ==
=== McDonald's franchises ===
In 1987, Hern moved to Arkansas and went to work for McDonald's; within a few years, he was an operations manager for several McDonald's franchises in the Little Rock area. In January 1997, he bought his first McDonald's, in North Little Rock. He sold it in 1999 and moved to Muskogee, Oklahoma, where he bought two franchises. He expanded his business to 18 franchises in the Tulsa, Oklahoma, area. In 2018, during his first campaign for office, The Frontier coined the nickname "McCongressman" for Hern. Other outlets picked the nickname up after his election. Hern sold his last McDonald's franchise in 2021.

=== Current businesses ===
In addition to his restaurant holdings, Hern started other business enterprises in Oklahoma, including a hog farm, a community bank, and several high-school sports publications. In 2019, he owned a company that manufactured decor and furniture for some of the largest U.S. fast-food restaurant companies and was the wealthiest serving congressman from Oklahoma. In 2023 he had assets worth between $36 million and $110 million.

During the COVID-19 pandemic, Hern's KTAK Corporation received between $1 million and $2 million in federally backed small business loans from American Bank and Trust as part of the Paycheck Protection Program (PPP). KTAK said it would retain 220 jobs. The loan was seen as notable since Hern is a vocal opponent of deficit spending; in 2018, discussing a balanced budget, he said, "While there is no easy fix to this, the first step is clear: stop adding to it." In 2020, he said: "This isn't a bailout. It's a repayment of what the government has taken away from American workers and businesses." KTAK operates franchises. During the PPP negotiations, Hern pushed to increase the amount of aid going to franchises. Hern was ranked 7th in the House of Representatives by total number of stock trades while in office between January 2020 and January 2022 and violated the STOCK Act in 2021 by failing to properly disclose stock trades worth up to $2.7 million. As of October 2025, his net worth was estimated at over $108 million.

In October 2025, Hern was rumored to be a candidate for president of the University of Tulsa.

== U.S. House of Representatives ==
=== Elections ===
==== 2018 ====
After Jim Bridenstine resigned from the House in 2018 to become administrator of NASA, Hern ran to succeed him in Oklahoma's 1st congressional district. Hern advanced to the runoff, in which he defeated Tulsa County District Attorney Tim Harris. He then advanced to the general election, in which he defeated Democratic nominee Tim Gilpin. Outgoing Governor Mary Fallin then appointed Hern to serve the rest of Bridenstine's third term. Under Oklahoma law, if a House seat falls vacant in an even-numbered year and the incumbent's term is due to end the following year, the governor may appoint someone to serve the remainder of the term. Hern was sworn into the House on November 13.

==== 2020 ====
Hern defeated Democratic nominee Kojo Asamoa-Caesar and Independent Evelyn L. Rogers in the November 2020 general election.

==== 2022 ====
Hern ran for a third term in 2022, despite speculation that he might run for the open Senate seat being vacated by Jim Inhofe. He defeated Democratic nominee Adam Martin and Independent Evelyn L. Rogers in the November general election.

==== 2024 ====
Hern ran for a fourth term in 2024. In the primary election, he defeated Paul Royse with 87% of the vote. He defeated Democratic nominee Dennis Baker and independent Mark Sanders in the general election.

=== Tenure ===
In December 2020, Hern was one of 126 Republican members of the House of Representatives to sign an amicus brief in support of Texas v. Pennsylvania, a lawsuit filed at the United States Supreme Court contesting the results of the 2020 presidential election, in which Joe Biden defeated incumbent Donald Trump. The Supreme Court declined to hear the case on the basis that Texas lacked standing under Article III of the Constitution to challenge the results of an election held by another state. Hern also was among 147 congressional Republicans who voted to overturn the 2020 election results. In 2022, Hern was one of 39 Republicans to vote for the Merger Filing Fee Modernization Act of 2022, an antitrust package that would crack down on corporations for anti-competitive behavior. In 2023, Hern was among 47 Republicans to vote in favor of H.Con.Res. 21, which directed President Joe Biden to remove U.S. troops from Syria within 180 days. He was later among 71 Republicans who voted against final passage of the Fiscal Responsibility Act of 2023. In July 2021, Hern voted against the bipartisan ALLIES Act, which would increase by 8,000 the number of special immigrant visas for Afghan allies of the U.S. military during its invasion of Afghanistan, while also reducing some application requirements that caused long application backlogs; the bill passed in the House 407–16.

==== January 2023 Speaker election ====
On the eighth ballot of the 2023 Speaker of the House of Representatives election, Hern received two votes, from Representative Lauren Boebert and Representative Josh Brecheen. Hern himself voted for Kevin McCarthy. He was officially nominated by Boebert on the ninth ballot and received three votes. He was again nominated by Boebert on the tenth ballot, and received seven votes. On the 11th ballot, Representative Bob Good of Virginia nominated Hern and he received seven votes. After the votes, Hern told The Frontier he was not ruling out a run for the Speakership and he would "think and pray about [it] before deciding." The next day, Kevin McCarthy secured the votes to win the election.

==== October 2023 Speaker election ====
On October 4, 2023, Hern announced his campaign for Speaker of the United States House of Representatives after Kevin McCarthy was removed by a motion to vacate. He suspended his campaign on October 7, saying a three-way speaker race was not in the party's interest. On October 11, he announced that he would seek the House Majority Leader post vacated by Steve Scalise; the same day he voted for Scalise to be Speaker in the Republican House caucus vote. During his candidacy, Hern received news coverage for serving McDonald's breakfast sandwiches to the Republican conference. After Scalise dropped out of the race, Hern supported Jim Jordan for the nomination during the first three votes. On October 20, after Jordan failed to be elected, Hern announced his candidacy again. He lost the conference vote on October 24 to Tom Emmer after being eliminated in the third round of a four-round vote. The same day he suspended his campaign and endorsed Mike Johnson in the race.

=== Committee assignments ===
For the 119th Congress:

- Committee on Ways and Means
  - Subcommittee on Health
  - Subcommittee on Tax

=== Caucus memberships ===
- Republican Study Committee
  - Chairman (118th Congress)
  - Budget and Spending Task Force Chairman (117th Congress)
- Rare Disease Caucus
- Congressional Taiwan Caucus

== 2026 U.S. Senate election ==
After President Trump announced his nomination of Markwayne Mullin for secretary of Homeland Security, Hern announced that he would run for Mullin's Senate seat in the 2026 election. In March 2026, Trump endorsed Hern. Hern won the general election with 57.2% of the vote, defeating Democratic nominee N'Kiyla Jasmine Thomas, who received 39.2%. Hern outraised and outspent Thomas by a factor of about 90 to 1.

Hern was elected to a full six-year term in the Senate; the previous regular election for this seat was in 2020, when Jim Inhofe was reelected.

== Political positions ==
Hern has positioned himself close to Donald Trump and emphasized his own business experience.

=== Welfare ===
Hern has called current welfare spending "tragic". He is a strong supporter of work requirements for welfare programs and supports the Temporary Assistance for Needy Families program because of its work requirement.

=== Healthcare ===
Hern opposes extending tax credits for the Affordable Care Act.

=== Election laws ===
Hern opposes ranked-choice voting.

=== Environment ===
Hern has expressed skepticism that humans are causing climate change.

== Personal life ==
Hern and his wife, Tammy, have three children and four grandchildren. It is his second marriage.

Hern is Protestant.

== Electoral history ==
2018 Republican primary results
Party	Candidate	Votes	%
Republican	Tim Harris	28,392	27.5
Republican	Kevin Hern	23,425	22.7
Republican	Andy Coleman	22,584	21.9
Republican	Nathan Dahm	20,843	20.2
Republican	Danny Stockstill	8,086	7.8
Total votes		103,330	100.0

2018 Republican primary runoff results
Party	Candidate	Votes	%
Republican	Kevin Hern	40,373	54.9
Republican	Tim Harris	33,138	45.1
Total votes		73,511	100.0

Oklahoma's 1st congressional district, 2018
Party	Candidate	Votes	%
Republican	Kevin Hern	150,129	59.3
Democratic	Tim Gilpin	103,042	40.7
Total votes		253,171	100.0
Republican hold			

Oklahoma's 1st congressional district, 2020
Party	Candidate	Votes	%
Republican	Kevin Hern (incumbent)	213,700	63.70
Democratic	Kojo Asamoa-Caesar	109,641	32.68
Independent	Evelyn L. Rogers	12,130	3.62
Total votes		335,471	100.0
Republican hold			

Oklahoma's 1st congressional district, 2022
Party	Candidate	Votes	%
Republican	Kevin Hern (incumbent)	142,800	61.16
Democratic	Adam Martin	80,974	34.68
Independent	Evelyn Rogers	9,721	4.16
Total votes		233,495	100.0
Republican hold			

2024 Oklahoma's 1st congressional district Republican primary results
Party	Candidate	Votes	%
Republican	Kevin Hern (incumbent)	30,244	87.0
Republican	Paul Royse	4,504	13.0
Total votes		34,748	100.0

2024 Oklahoma's 1st congressional district election results
Party	Candidate	Votes	%
Republican	Kevin Hern (incumbent)	188,832	60.43%
Democratic	Dennis Baker	107,903	34.53%
Independent	Mark Sanders	15,766	5.05%
Total votes		312,501	100%

2026 United States Senate election in Oklahoma
Party	Candidate	Votes	%
Republican	Kevin Hern	639,860	57.20
Democratic	N'Kiyla Jasmine Thomas	439,522	39.29
Independent	Curtis Stinnett	14,635	1.31
Independent	Ron Meinhardt	14,504	1.30
Libertarian	Sevier White	10,209	0.91
Total votes		1,118,730	100.0

U.S. House of Representatives
Preceded by Jim Bridenstine	Member of the U.S. House of Representatives from Oklahoma's 1st congressional district 2018–present	Incumbent
Party political offices
Preceded by Jim Banks	Chair of the Republican Study Committee; 2023–2025	Succeeded by August Pfluger
Preceded by Gary Palmer	Chair of the House Republican Policy Committee; 2025–2026	Succeeded by Jay Obernolte
Preceded by Markwayne Mullin	Republican nominee for U.S. Senator from Oklahoma (Class 2); 2026	Most recent
U.S. Senate
Preceded by Alan Armstrong	U.S. Senator (Class 2) from Oklahoma; Taking office 2026; Served alongside: James Lankford	Elect
U.S. order of precedence (ceremonial)
Preceded by Troy Balderson	United States representatives by seniority 184th	Succeeded by Joseph Morelle
