= Stephanie Bice =

American politician (born 1973)

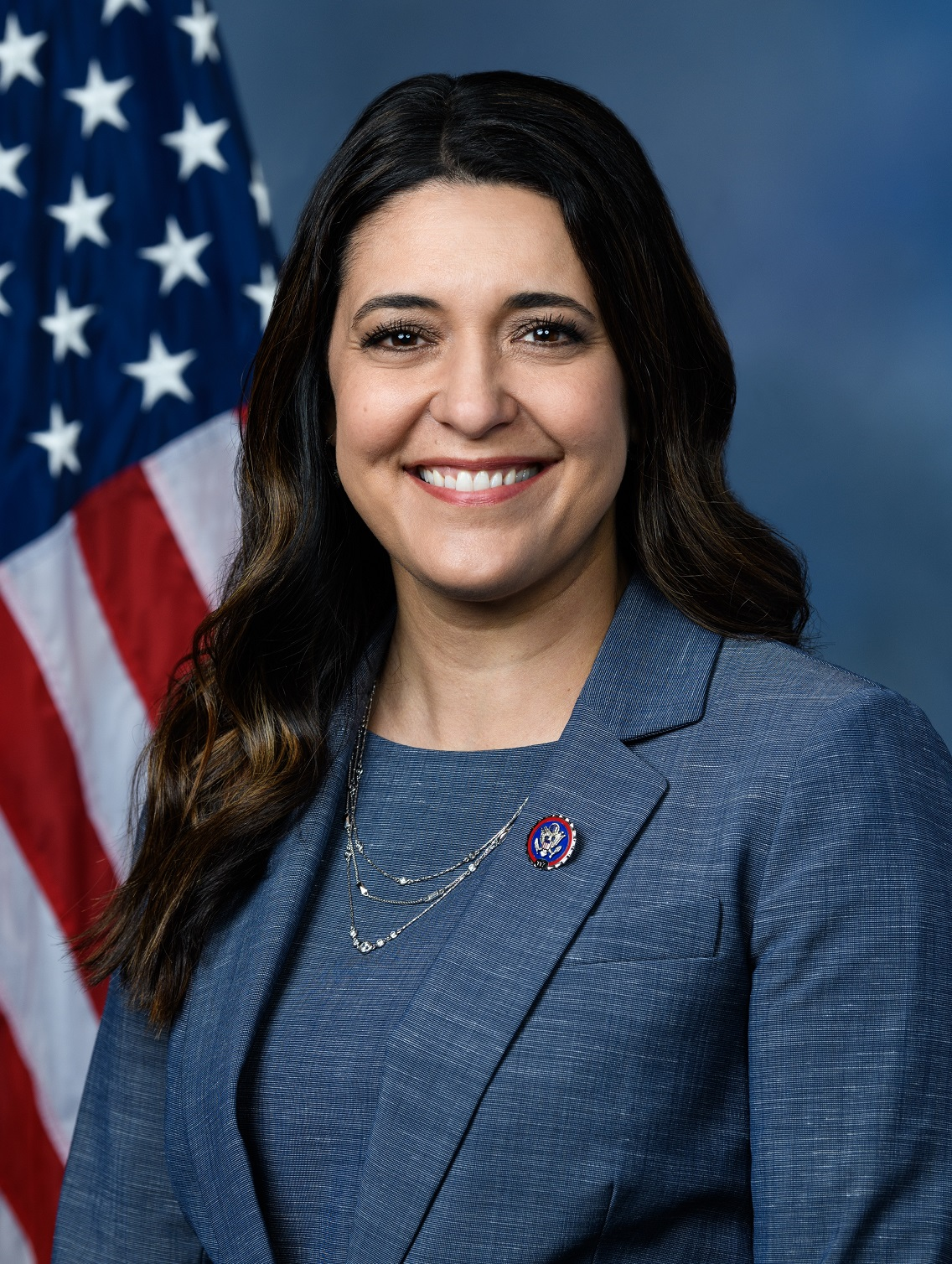
- Official portrait, 2021

Member of the U.S. House of Representatives from Oklahoma's 5th district
- Incumbent
- Assumed office January 3, 2021
- Preceded by: Kendra Horn

Member of the Oklahoma Senate from the 22nd district
- In office November 18, 2014 – December 31, 2020
- Preceded by: Rob Johnson
- Succeeded by: Jake Merrick

Personal details
- Born: Stephanie Irene Asady; November 11, 1973 (age 53) Oklahoma City, Oklahoma, U.S.
- Party: Republican
- Spouse: Geoffrey Bice (m. 1996)
- Children: 2
- Education: Oklahoma State University, Stillwater (BS)
- Website: House Website; Campaign website
- Bice's voice Bice on the 28th anniversary of the Oklahoma City Bombing. Recorded April 19, 2023

Stephanie Irene Bice (née Asady; born November 11, 1973) is an American politician serving as the U.S. representative for Oklahoma's 5th congressional district since 2021. She is the first American of Iranian descent to be elected to Congress. A member of the Republican Party, Bice previously represented the 22nd district in the Oklahoma Senate from 2014 to 2020.

== Early life, education, and early career ==
Bice was born in Oklahoma City to an American mother, Paula Sue Vanhooser and a half Iranian and half Pakistani father, Hosein "Joe" Asady. Asady came to California from Zahedan, Iran, via Karachi, Pakistan, at a young age to study computer science.

Bice graduated from Putnam City High School in Oklahoma City. After graduating from Oklahoma State University with a bachelor's degree in marketing and a minor in international business, Bice worked for eight years in financial oversight, business strategy, and marketing for her family's technology company in Oklahoma City. She later helped lead a boutique digital marketing agency in Oklahoma City as vice president of business development.

== Oklahoma Senate ==
=== Elections ===
Bice was first elected to the Oklahoma Senate in 2014. She was reelected in 2018 with 73% of the vote in the Republican primary and 68% of the vote in the general election.

=== Tenure ===
Bice represented the 22nd district in the Oklahoma Senate from 2014 to 2020. She served on the Subcommittee on General Government and Transportation, and the Business, Commerce & Tourism, Finance, Public Safety committees. In 2016, the Senate Republican Caucus elected Bice Assistant Majority Floor Leader.

Bice was the Senate sponsor of House Bill 1269, a law that provided relief to people who were serving felony prison sentences for crimes that are now misdemeanors. Instead of automatically granting retroactive relief to all eligible inmates, state lawmakers directed the Pardon and Parole Board to establish an accelerated, single-stage commutation docket to review eligible cases.

Bice sponsored SB 142, a measure that deals with the overuse of powerful antipsychotic drugs for nursing home patients who have not received a psychiatric diagnosis or given informed consent. The action was signed into law in May 2019.

Bice sponsored State Question 792, overhauling Oklahoma's liquor laws by allowing grocery stores to sell full-strength beer and wine.

== U.S. House of Representatives ==
=== Elections ===
==== 2020 ====
In April 2019, Bice announced her candidacy for Oklahoma's 5th congressional district in the 2020 election. The 5th district had been a Republican stronghold for over 40 years until Democrat Kendra Horn was elected in 2018.

In June 2020, Oklahoman.com reported that the Bice campaign sent a mailer including the Oklahomans for Life logo without the organization's permission. Bice said, "I understand Oklahomans for Life wasn't endorsing in this race and wanted to make clear that I am pro-life and have stood with Oklahomans for Life".

Bice placed second in the June 30 Republican primary behind Terry Neese, a businesswoman who was the Republican nominee for lieutenant governor of Oklahoma in 1990. As no candidate won 50% of the vote, Bice and Neese advanced to a runoff. Bice defeated Neese in the runoff and Horn in the general election. She focused her campaign on immigration and affordable healthcare.

Bice is the first Iranian-American elected to Congress.

==== 2022 ====
Bice defeated primary challenger Subrina Banks in the Republican primary. She defeated Democratic candidate Joshua Harris-Till and Independent David Frosch in the general election. Redistricting made Bice's district much safer for her by shifting a mostly Latino sliver of Oklahoma City to the heavily Republican 3rd district.

==== 2024 ====
Bice drew no Republican primary challengers in 2024. In the general election, Bice defeated Democratic candidate Madison Horn (unrelated to Kendra Horn, whom Bice had defeated in 2020).

==== 2026 ====
Bice drew no Republican primary challengers in 2026. She narrowly defeated Democratic nominee Jena Nelson in the general election, receiving 49.5% of the vote to Nelson's 48.2%.

=== Tenure and political positions ===
In late 2020, Bice was identified as a participant in the Freedom Force, a group of incoming Republican members of the House of Representatives who "say they're fighting against socialism in America".

On January 6, 2021, Bice voted to object to Arizona's and Pennsylvania's electoral votes in the 2020 presidential election.

On January 20, the day of Joe Biden's inauguration, Bice was one of 17 newly elected House Republicans to sign a letter congratulating him and expressing hope of bipartisan cooperation.

In March 2021, Bice voted against the American Rescue Plan Act of 2021.

On May 19, 2021, Bice was one of 35 Republicans who joined all Democrats in voting to approve legislation to establish the January 6 commission meant to investigate the storming of the U.S. Capitol that year.

Bice voted to provide Israel with military support following 2023 Hamas attack on Israel.

In July 2025, Bice voted for the One Big Beautiful Bill Act. She also introduced a resolution saying that The Star-Spangled Banner should only be performed in English.

In July 2025, Bice reaffirmed her support for government-backed research funding, saying she would fight against major cuts to institutions like the NIH. She also announced that she had secured commitments from Trump administration officials to ensure that more research dollars go to the Midwest.

In January 2026, Bice was one of 57 Republicans who voted against blocking funding for federally driven “kill switch” vehicle technology, allowing regulators to move forward with systems that could monitor drivers and intervene in vehicle operation.

Bice has been supportive of the 2026 Iran war. In June 2026, she voted against a war powers resolution that would have limited the war in Iran until congressional authorization for it was obtained.

=== Committee assignments ===
- United States House Committee on Appropriations
  - Subcommittee on Transportation, Housing and Urban Development, and Related Agencies (Vice Chair)
  - Subcommittee on Labor, Health and Human Services, Education, and Related Agencies (Vice Chair)
  - Subcommittee on Military Construction, Veterans Affairs, and Related Agencies
- United States House Committee on House Administration
  - United States House Administration Subcommittee on Modernization (Chair)

=== Caucus memberships ===
- BIOTech Caucus
- Congressional Coalition on Adoption
- Rare Disease Caucus

=== Appointments ===
- National Security Commission on Emerging Biotechnology

== Personal life ==
She married Geoffrey Bice in 1996. They have two daughters and live in Edmond, Oklahoma. Bice is Roman Catholic and attends St. Eugene Catholic Church in Oklahoma City. She converted to Catholicism before her wedding. Bice was the commencement speaker in 2024 at Oklahoma State University, her alma mater.

Bice is a fan of the Oklahoma City Thunder. When the 2024–25 team won the 2025 NBA Finals, Bice was one of many Oklahoma politicians who celebrated the victory.

== Electoral history ==
=== Oklahoma Senate ===
2014 Oklahoma's 22nd Senate district Republican primary
| Party | Candidate | Votes | % |
|---|---|---|---|
| Republican | Stephanie Bice | 3,191 | 37.1 |
| Republican | Mark Thomas | 2,845 | 33.2 |
| Republican | Leif Francel | 2,537 | 29.6 |
| Total votes | | 8,573 | 100.0 |

2014 Oklahoma's 22nd Senate district Republican primary runoff
| Party | Candidate | Votes | % |
|---|---|---|---|
| Republican | Stephanie Bice | 2,693 | 53.1 |
| Republican | Mark Thomas | 2,381 | 46.9 |
| Total votes | | 5,074 | 100.0 |

Bice was unopposed in the 2014 general election.

2018 Oklahoma's 22nd Senate district election
| Party | Candidate | Votes | % | ±% |
|---|---|---|---|---|
| Republican | Stephanie Bice | 24,465 | 68.3% | N/A |
| Democratic | William Andrews | 11,377 | 31.7% | N/A |
| Total votes | | 35,842 | 100% | N/A |

=== U.S. House ===
2020 Oklahoma's 5th congressional district Republican primary
| Party | Candidate | Votes | % |
|---|---|---|---|
| Republican | Terry Neese | 24,822 | 36.5 |
| Republican | Stephanie Bice | 17,289 | 25.4 |
| Republican | David Hill | 12,915 | 19.0 |
| Republican | Janet Barresi | 6,796 | 10.0 |
| Republican | Jake A. Merrick | 1,736 | 2.6 |
| Republican | Michael Ballard | 1,689 | 2.5 |
| Republican | Miles V. Rahimi | 966 | 1.4 |
| Republican | Shelli Landon | 912 | 1.3 |
| Republican | Charles Tuffy Pringle | 907 | 1.3 |
| Total votes | | 68,032 | 100.0 |

2020 Oklahoma's 5th congressional district Republican primary runoff
| Party | Candidate | Votes | % |
|---|---|---|---|
| Republican | Stephanie Bice | 27,402 | 52.9 |
| Republican | Terry Neese | 24,369 | 47.1 |
| Total votes | | 51,771 | 100.0 |

2020 Oklahoma's 5th congressional district election
| Party | Candidate | Votes | % |
|---|---|---|---|
| Republican | Stephanie Bice | 158,191 | 52.1 |
| Democratic | Kendra Horn (incumbent) | 145,658 | 47.9 |
| Total votes | | 303,849 | 100.0 |

2022 Oklahoma's 5th congressional district Republican primary
| Party | Candidate | Votes | % |
|---|---|---|---|
| Republican | Stephanie Bice (incumbent) | 51,612 | 68.4 |
| Republican | Subrina Banks | 23,891 | 31.6 |
| Total votes | | 75,503 | 100.0 |

2022 Oklahoma's 5th congressional district election
| Party | Candidate | Votes | % |
|---|---|---|---|
| Republican | Stephanie Bice (incumbent) | 152,699 | 59.0 |
| Democratic | Joshua Harris-Till | 96,799 | 37.4 |
| Independent | David Frosch | 9,328 | 3.6 |
| Total votes | | 258,826 | 100.0 |

2024 Oklahoma's 5th congressional district election
| Party | Candidate | Votes | % |
|---|---|---|---|
| Republican | Stephanie Bice (incumbent) | 207,636 | 60.69 |
| Democratic | Madison Horn | 134,471 | 39.31 |
| Total votes | | 342,107 | 100.0 |

2026 Oklahoma's 5th congressional district election
| Party | Candidate | Votes | % |
|---|---|---|---|
| Republican | Stephanie Bice (incumbent) | 131,023 | 49.48 |
| Democratic | Jena Nelson | 127,687 | 48.22 |
| Independent | Robert Henri | 4,027 | 1.52 |
| Independent | Austin Nieves | 2,047 | 0.77 |
| Total votes | | 264,784 | 100.0 |

== See also ==
- Women in the United States House of Representatives
- List of Arab and Middle Eastern Americans in the United States Congress
- List of Asian Americans and Pacific Islander Americans in the United States Congress

U.S. House of Representatives
| Preceded by Kendra Horn | Member of the U.S. House of Representatives from Oklahoma's 5th congressional district 2021–present | Incumbent |
U.S. order of precedence (ceremonial)
| Preceded by Cliff Bentz | United States representatives by seniority 242nd | Succeeded by Lauren Boebert |
