= 2020 United States House of Representatives elections in Oklahoma =

- November 3, 2020

All 5 Oklahoma seats to the United States House of Representatives
	Majority party	Minority party
Party	Republican	Democratic
Last election	4	1
Seats won	5	0
Seat change	▲1	▼1
Popular vote	1,044,175	475,731
Percentage	67.31%	30.66%
Swing	▲5.34%	▼5.69%
- Republican 50–60% 60–70% 70–80% 80–90% >90%

The 2020 United States House of Representatives elections in Oklahoma were held on November 3, 2020, to elect the five U.S. representatives from the state of Oklahoma, one from each of the state's five congressional districts. The elections coincided with the 2020 U.S. presidential election, as well as other elections to the House of Representatives, elections to the United States Senate and various state and local elections.

== Overview ==
District	Republican		Democratic		Others		Total		Result
District	Votes	%	Votes	%	Votes	%	Votes	%	Result
District 1	213,700	63.70%	109,641	32.68%	12,130	3.62%	335,471	100.0%	Republican hold
District 2	216,511	75.04%	63,472	22.00%	8,544	2.96%	288,527	100.0%	Republican hold
District 3	242,677	78.49%	66,501	21.51%	0	0.00%	309,178	100.0%	Republican hold
District 4	213,096	67.79%	90,459	28.78%	10,803	3.44%	314,358	100.0%	Republican hold
District 5	158,191	52.06%	145,658	47.94%	0	0.00%	303,849	100.0%	Republican gain
Total	1,044,175	67.31%	475,731	30.66%	31,477	2.03%	1,551,383	100.0%	

Popular vote
Republican	67.31%
Democratic	30.66%
Other	2.03%

House seats
Republican	100.00%

== District 1 ==
2020 Oklahoma's 1st congressional district election
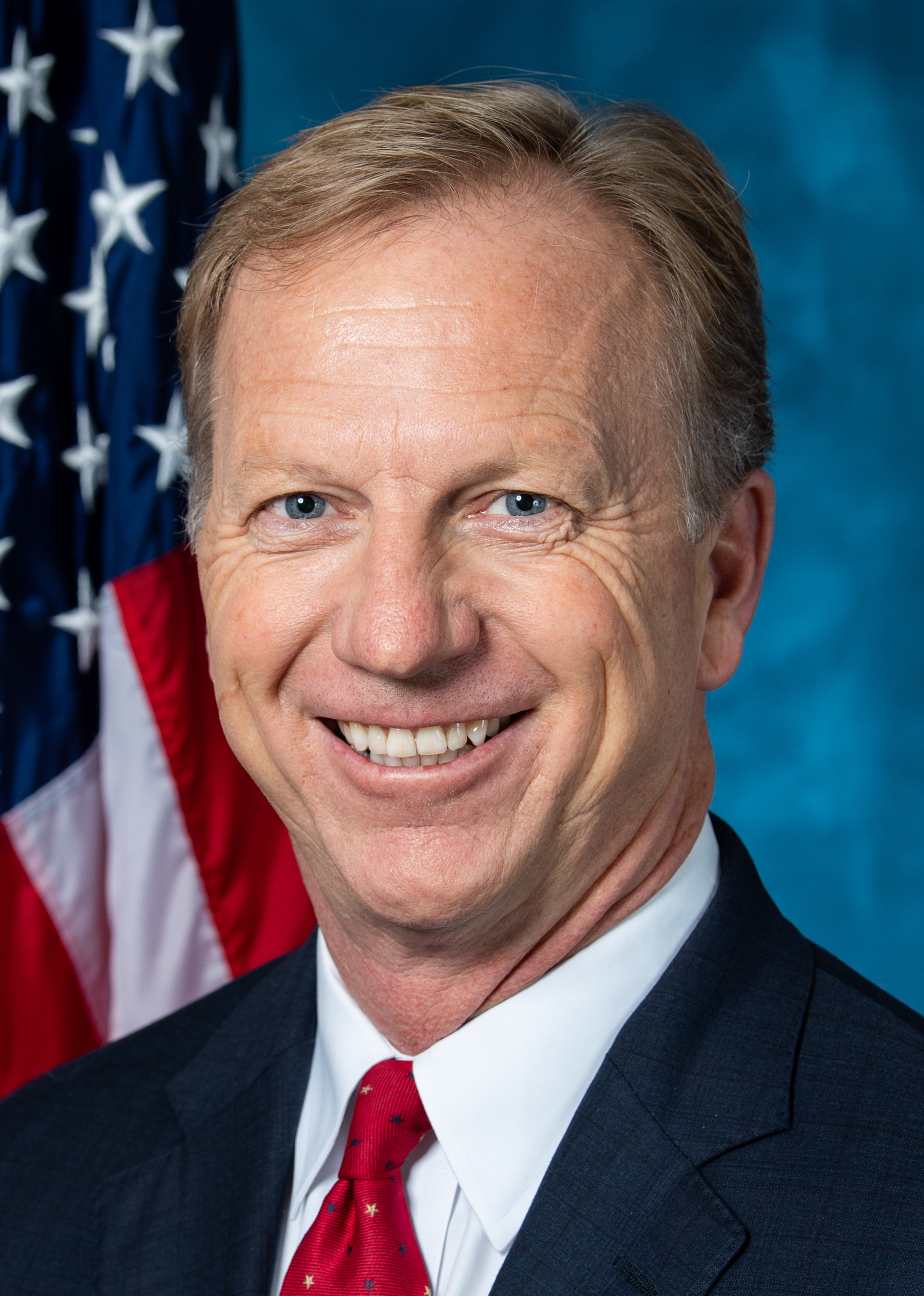

Nominee	Kevin Hern	Kojo Asamoa-Caesar
Party	Republican	Democratic
Popular vote	213,700	109,641
Percentage	63.7%	32.7%
- Precinct and county-level results Hern: 40–50% 50–60% 60–70% 70–80% 80–90% ≥90% Caesar: 40–50% 50–60% 60–70% 70–80% 80–90% ≥90% No votes
U.S. Representative before election
Kevin Hern
Republican
Elected U.S. Representative
Kevin Hern
Republican

The 1st district was located in the Tulsa metropolitan area and included Creek, Rogers, Tulsa, Wagoner and Washington counties. The incumbent Republican, Kevin Hern, was elected with 59.3% of the vote in 2018. He won reelection with 63.7% of the vote.

=== Republican primary ===
==== Candidates ====
===== Nominee =====
- Kevin Hern, incumbent U.S. Representative

=== Democratic primary ===
==== Candidates ====
===== Nominee =====
- Kojo Asamoa-Caesar, entrepreneur

===== Eliminated in primary =====
- Mark A. Keeter, businessman

==== Endorsements ====
Kojo Asamoa-Caesar

Organizations

- #VoteProChoice

==== Primary results ====
Democratic primary results
Party	Candidate	Votes	%
Democratic	Kojo Asamoa-Caesar	34,868	63.6
Democratic	Mark A. Keeter	19,924	36.4
Total votes		54,792	100.0

=== Independents ===
==== Declared ====
- Evelyn Rogers, perennial candidate

=== General election ===
==== Predictions ====
Source	Ranking	As of
The Cook Political Report	Safe R	July 2, 2020
Inside Elections	Safe R	June 2, 2020
Sabato's Crystal Ball	Safe R	July 2, 2020
Politico	Safe R	April 19, 2020
Daily Kos	Safe R	June 3, 2020
RCP	Safe R	June 9, 2020
Niskanen	Safe R	June 7, 2020

==== Polling ====
Poll source	Date(s) administered	Sample size (Note: Key: A – all adults RV – registered voters LV – likely voters V – unclear)	Margin of error	Kojo Asamoa-Caesar (D)	Kevin Hern (R)	Evelyn Rogers (I)	Undecided
SoonerPoll	October 15–20, 2020	1,492 (LV)	± 1.32%	29.83%	58.8%	5.64%	5.8%

==== Results ====
Oklahoma's 1st congressional district, 2020
Party	Candidate	Votes	%
Republican	Kevin Hern (incumbent)	213,700	63.7
Democratic	Kojo Asamoa-Caesar	109,641	32.7
Independent	Evelyn Rogers	12,130	3.6
Total votes		335,471	100.0
Republican hold			

== District 2 ==
2020 Oklahoma's 2nd congressional district election
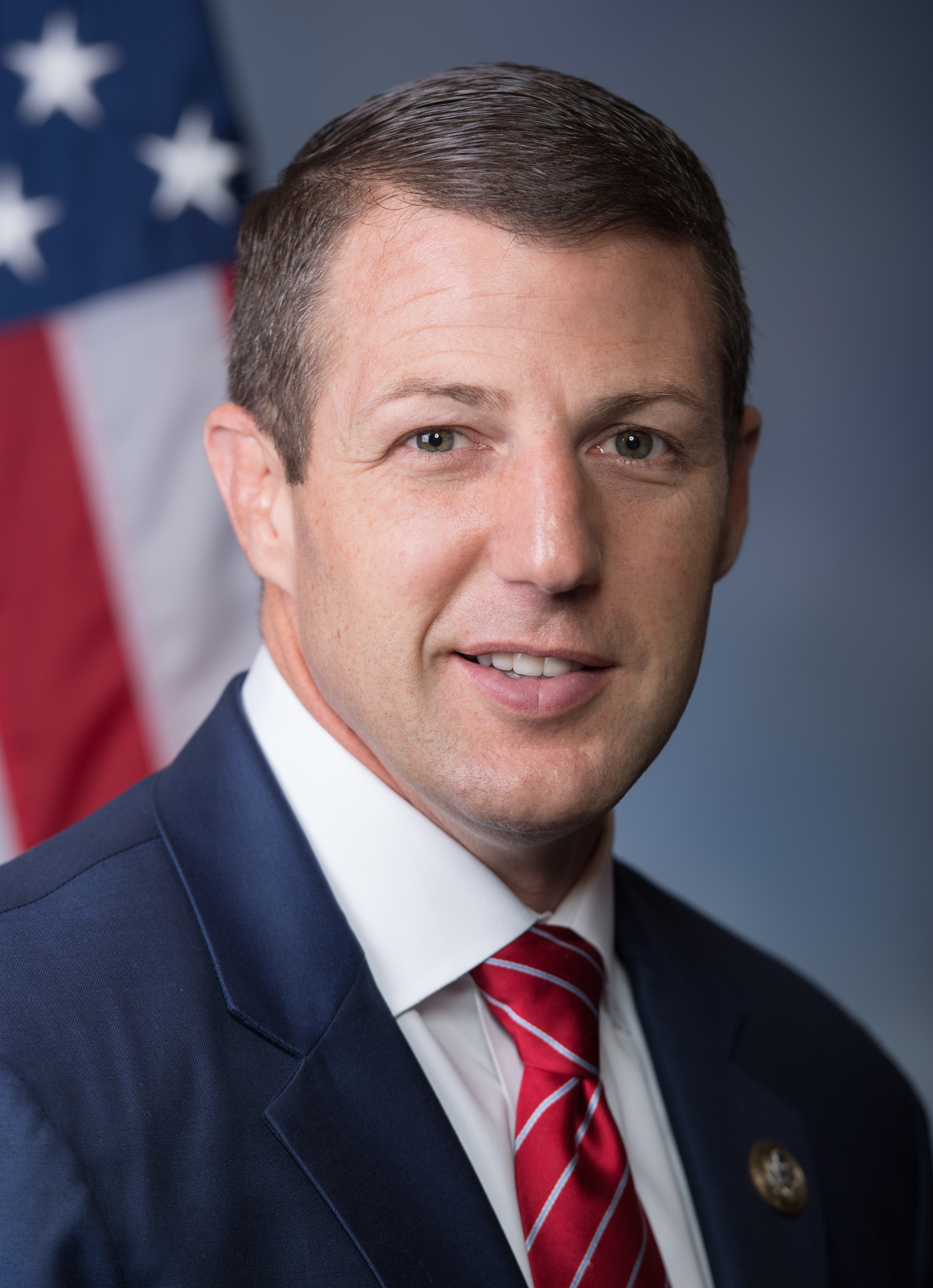

Nominee	Markwayne Mullin	Danyell Lanier
Party	Republican	Democratic
Popular vote	216,511	63,472
Percentage	75.0%	22.0%
- Precinct and county-level results Mullin: 40–50% 50–60% 60–70% 70–80% 80–90% ≥90% Lanier: 40–50% 50–60% 60–70% 70–80% No votes
U.S. Representative before election
Markwayne Mullin
Republican
Elected U.S. Representative
Markwayne Mullin
Republican

The 2nd district encompassed eastern Oklahoma including Choctaw Country, Muskogee and Tahlequah. The incumbent was Republican Markwayne Mullin, who was re-elected with 65.0% of the vote in 2018. He was reelected with 75% of the vote.

=== Republican primary ===
==== Candidates ====
===== Nominee =====
- Markwayne Mullin, incumbent U.S. Representative

===== Eliminated in primary =====
- Rhonda Hopkins, nominee for District 86 of the Oklahoma House of Representatives in 2016
- Joseph Silk, state senator

==== Endorsements ====
Markwayne Mullin

U.S. presidents

- Donald Trump, President of the United States

==== Primary results ====
Republican primary results
Party	Candidate	Votes	%
Republican	Markwayne Mullin (incumbent)	53,149	79.9
Republican	Joseph Silk	8,445	12.7
Republican	Rhonda Hopkins	4,917	7.4
Total votes		66,511	100.0

=== Democratic primary ===
==== Nominee ====
- Danyell Lanier, project analyst

=== Libertarian primary ===
==== Declared ====
- Richie Castaldo, Libertarian nominee for Oklahoma's 2nd congressional district in 2018

=== General election ===
==== Predictions ====
Source	Ranking	As of
The Cook Political Report	Safe R	July 2, 2020
Inside Elections	Safe R	June 2, 2020
Sabato's Crystal Ball	Safe R	July 2, 2020
Politico	Safe R	April 19, 2020
Daily Kos	Safe R	June 3, 2020
RCP	Safe R	June 9, 2020
Niskanen	Safe R	June 7, 2020

==== Results ====
Oklahoma's 2nd congressional district, 2020
Party	Candidate	Votes	%
Republican	Markwayne Mullin (incumbent)	216,511	75.0
Democratic	Danyell Lanier	63,472	22.0
Libertarian	Richie Castaldo	8,544	3.0
Total votes		288,527	100.0
Republican hold			

== District 3 ==
2020 Oklahoma's 3rd congressional district election
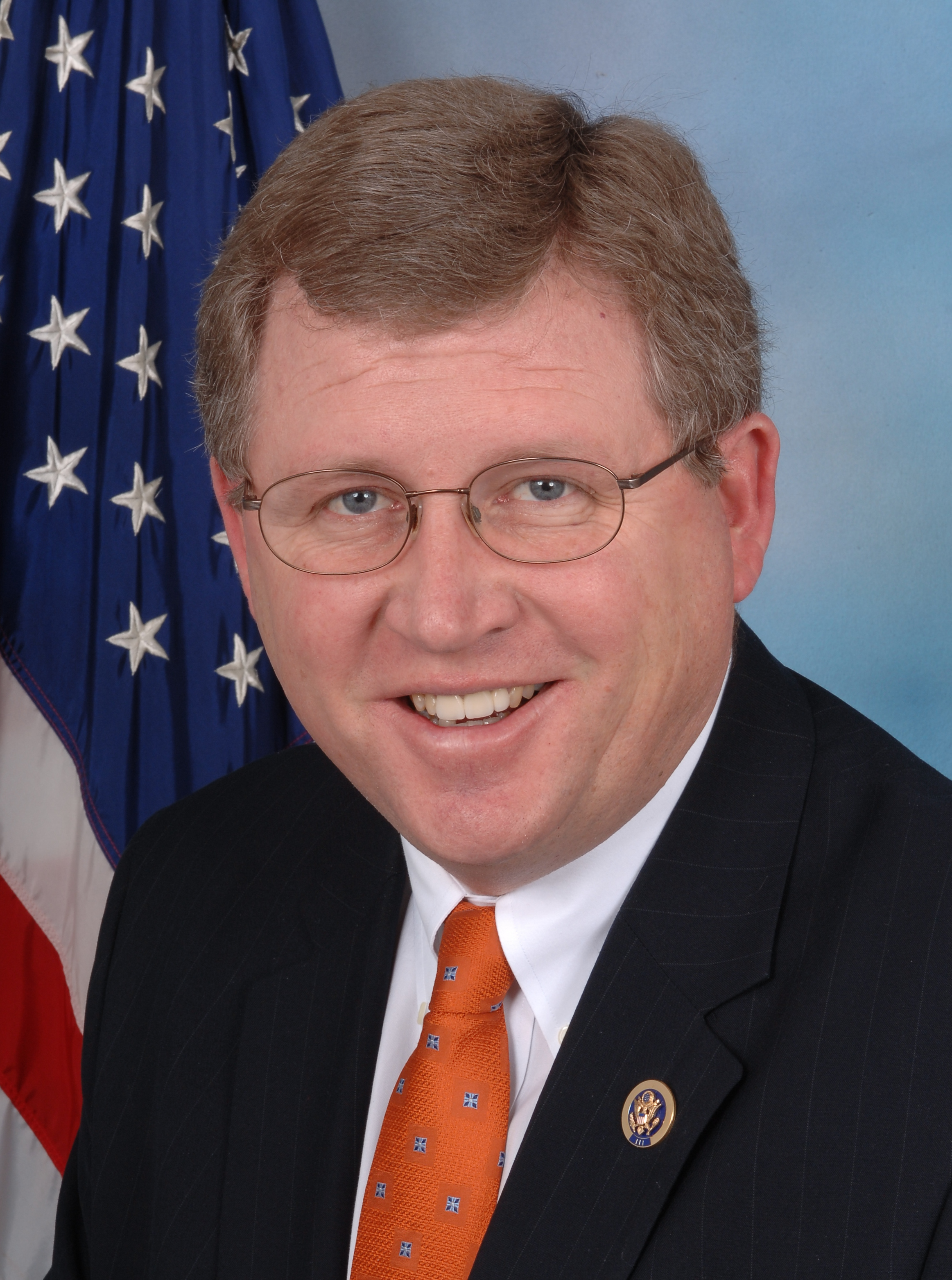

Nominee	Frank Lucas	Zoe Midyett
Party	Republican	Democratic
Popular vote	242,677	66,501
Percentage	78.5%	21.5%
- Precinct and county-level results Lucas: 40–50% 50–60% 60–70% 70–80% 80–90% ≥90% Midyett: 40–50% 50–60% 60–70% 80–90% ≥90%
U.S. Representative before election
Frank Lucas
Republican
Elected U.S. Representative
Frank Lucas
Republican

The 3rd district encompassed Northwestern Oklahoma, taking in the Oklahoma Panhandle, Ponca City, Pawnee, Stillwater, as well as the Osage Nation. The incumbent was Republican Frank Lucas, who was re-elected with 73.9% of the vote in 2018. He was reelected with 78.5% of the vote.

=== Republican primary ===
==== Candidates ====
===== Nominee =====
- Frank D. Lucas, incumbent U.S. Representative

===== Withdrew =====
- Joshua Jantz

=== Democratic primary ===
==== Nominee ====
- Zoe Midyett, rancher

=== General election ===
==== Predictions ====
Source	Ranking	As of
The Cook Political Report	Safe R	July 2, 2020
Inside Elections	Safe R	June 2, 2020
Sabato's Crystal Ball	Safe R	July 2, 2020
Politico	Safe R	April 19, 2020
Daily Kos	Safe R	June 3, 2020
RCP	Safe R	June 9, 2020
Niskanen	Safe R	June 7, 2020

==== Results ====
Oklahoma's 3rd congressional district, 2020
Party	Candidate	Votes	%
Republican	Frank D. Lucas (incumbent)	242,677	78.5
Democratic	Zoe Midyett	66,501	21.5
Total votes		309,178	100.0
Republican hold			

== District 4 ==
2020 Oklahoma's 4th congressional district election
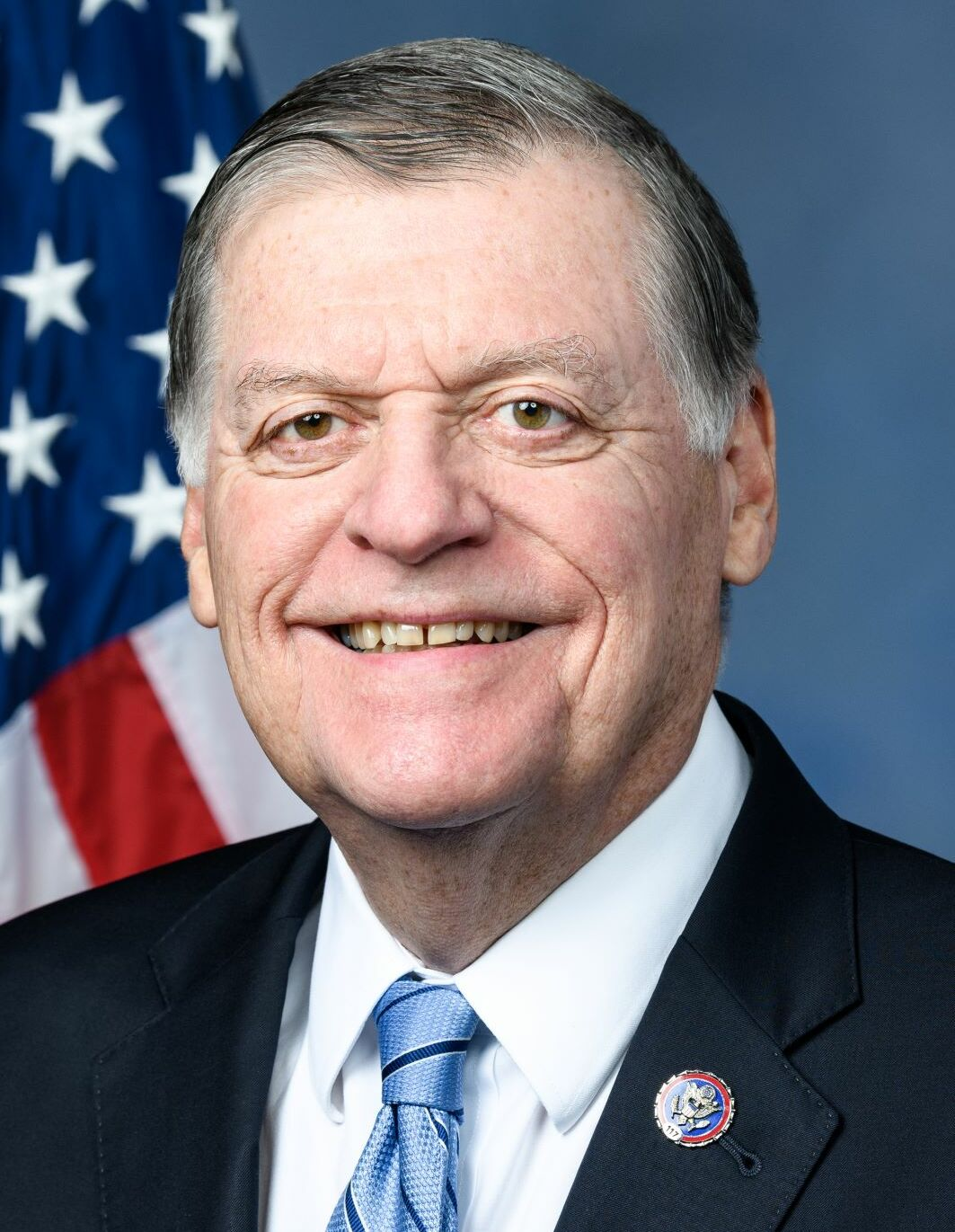

Nominee	Tom Cole	Mary Brannon
Party	Republican	Democratic
Popular vote	213,096	90,459
Percentage	67.8%	28.8%
- Precinct and county-level results Cole: 40–50% 50–60% 60–70% 70–80% 80–90% ≥90% Brannon: 40–50% 50–60% 60–70% 70–80% No votes
U.S. Representative before election
Tom Cole
Republican
Elected U.S. Representative
Tom Cole
Republican

The 4th district was located in South Central Oklahoma and took in parts of the Oklahoma City suburbs, including in Canadian County and Cleveland County. The incumbent was Republican Tom Cole, who was re-elected with 63.1% of the vote in 2018. He was reelected with 67.8% of the vote.

=== Republican primary ===
==== Candidates ====
===== Nominee =====
- Tom Cole, incumbent U.S. Representative

===== Eliminated in primary =====
- Gilbert O. Sanders, mental health professional
- Trevor Sipes, businessman
- James Taylor, teacher and candidate for Oklahoma's 4th congressional district in 2016 and 2018

==== Primary results ====
Republican primary results
Party	Candidate	Votes	%
Republican	Tom Cole (incumbent)	55,699	76.3
Republican	James Taylor	11,081	15.2
Republican	Trevor Sipes	4,357	6.0
Republican	Gilbert O. Sanders	1,833	2.5
Total votes		72,970	100.0

=== Democratic primary ===
==== Candidates ====
===== Nominee =====
- Mary Brannon, retired educator and nominee for Oklahoma's 4th congressional district in 2018

===== Eliminated in primary =====
- John D. Argo, metalworker
- David R. Slemmons, retired librarian

==== Withdrew ====
- Wyndi Brown, activist and entrepreneur
- Wesley Forbes, energy program assistant

==== Primary results ====
Democratic primary results
Party	Candidate	Votes	%
Democratic	Mary Brannon	32,199	63.9
Democratic	David R. Slemmons	9,793	19.4
Democratic	John D. Argo	8,436	16.7
Total votes		50,428	100.0

=== Libertarian primary ===
==== Declared ====
- Bob White, Libertarian nominee for Oklahoma's 4th congressional district in 2016

=== General election ===
==== Predictions ====
Source	Ranking	As of
The Cook Political Report	Safe R	July 2, 2020
Inside Elections	Safe R	June 2, 2020
Sabato's Crystal Ball	Safe R	July 2, 2020
Politico	Safe R	April 19, 2020
Daily Kos	Safe R	June 3, 2020
RCP	Safe R	June 9, 2020
Niskanen	Safe R	June 7, 2020

==== Results ====
Oklahoma's 4th congressional district, 2020
Party	Candidate	Votes	%
Republican	Tom Cole (incumbent)	213,096	67.8
Democratic	Mary Brannon	90,459	28.8
Libertarian	Bob White	10,803	3.4
Total votes		314,358	100.0
Republican hold			

== District 5 ==
2020 Oklahoma's 5th congressional district election
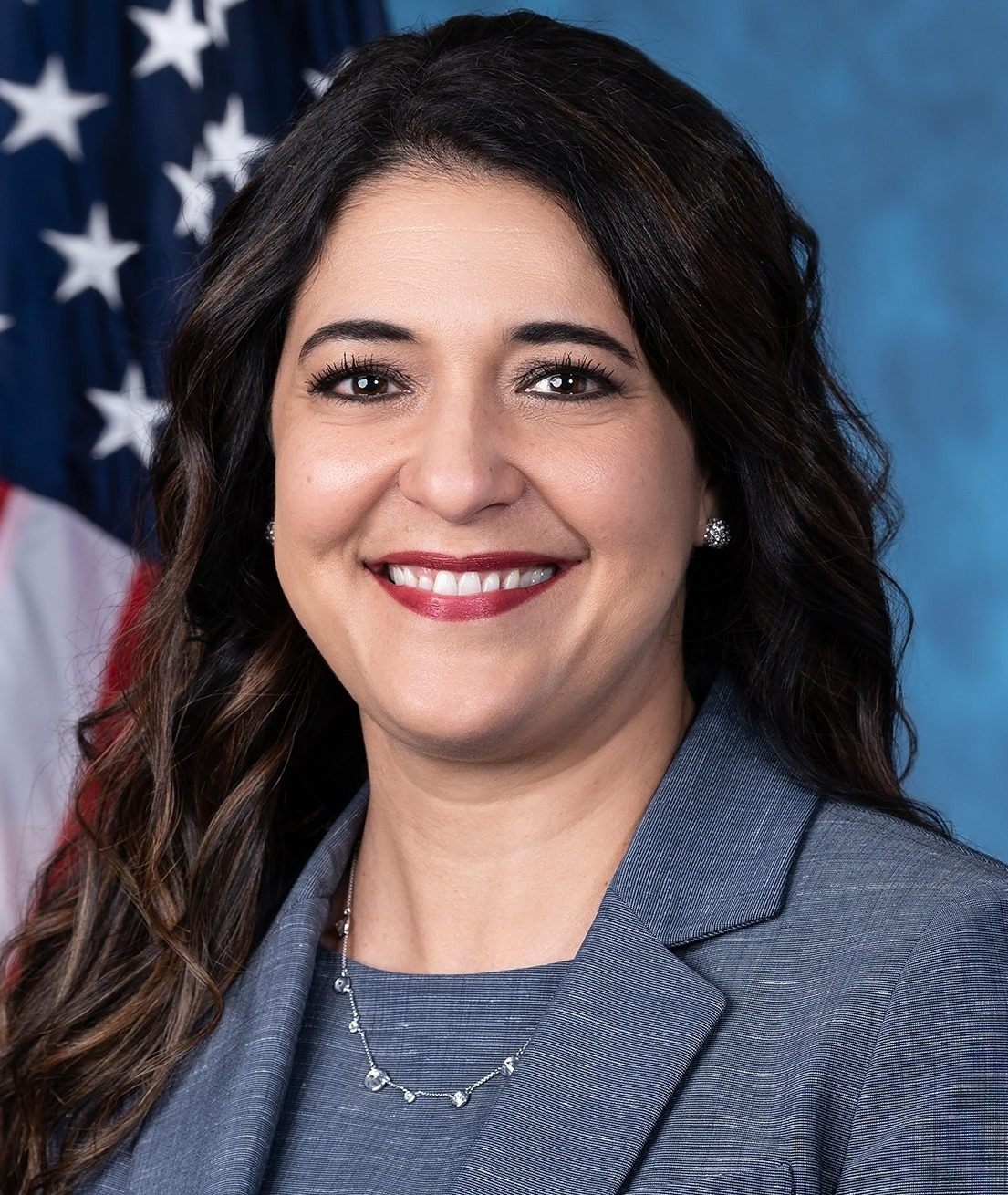

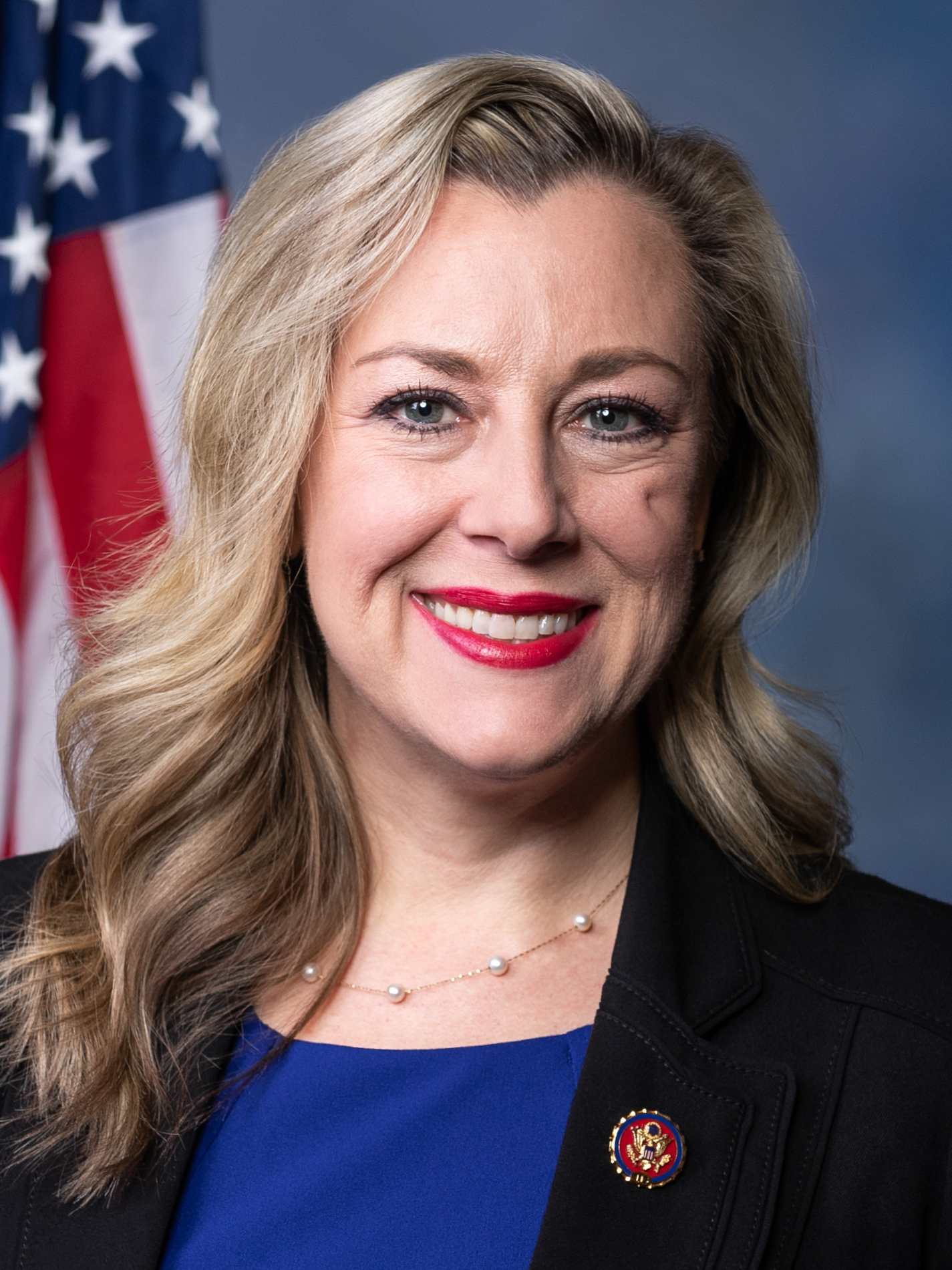
Nominee	Stephanie Bice	Kendra Horn
Party	Republican	Democratic
Popular vote	158,191	145,658
Percentage	52.1%	47.9%
- Precinct and county-level results Bice: 50–60% 60–70% 70–80% 80–90% Horn: 50–60% 60–70% 70–80% 80–90% ≥90% No votes
U.S. Representative before election
Kendra Horn
Democratic
Elected U.S. Representative
Stephanie Bice
Republican

The 5th district was based in Oklahoma City and its surrounding suburbs. The incumbent was Democrat Kendra Horn, who flipped the district and was elected with 50.7% of the vote in 2018. She lost reelection to Republican challenger Stephanie Bice, who received 52.1% of the vote.

=== Democratic primary ===
==== Candidates ====
===== Nominee =====
- Kendra Horn, incumbent U.S. Representative

===== Eliminated in primary =====
- Tom Guild, perennial candidate

==== Endorsements ====
Tom Guild

Organizations

- Blue America
Kendra Horn

Organizations

- EMILY's List
- End Citizens United
- Human Rights Campaign
- Jewish Democratic Council of America
- National Organization for Women
- Planned Parenthood

==== Primary results ====
Democratic primary results
Party	Candidate	Votes	%
Democratic	Kendra Horn (incumbent)	60,168	85.7
Democratic	Tom Guild	10,050	14.3
Total votes		70,218	100.0

=== Republican primary ===
==== Candidates ====
===== Nominee =====
- Stephanie Bice, Assistant Majority Floor Leader of the Oklahoma State Senate

===== Eliminated in runoff =====
- Terry Neese, entrepreneur and nominee for Lieutenant Governor in 1990

===== Eliminated in primary =====
- Michael Ballard, veteran
- Janet Barresi, former Oklahoma Superintendent of Public Instruction
- David Hill, businessman
- Shelli Landon, singer
- Jake A. Merrick, businessman and former Southwestern Christian University professor of philosophy and theology
- Charles Tuffy Pringle, real estate broker
- Miles Rahimi, U.S. Navy veteran and community organizer

===== Withdrew =====
- Dan Belcher, entrepreneur
- David Greene, former horse stall cleaner
- Merideth VanSant, businesswoman

===== Declined =====
- Kevin Calvey, Oklahoma County commissioner
- Mick Cornett, former mayor of Oklahoma City and candidate for Governor of Oklahoma in 2018
- Carol Hefner, Donald Trump's 2016 Oklahoma campaign manager
- Bob Mills, businessman and co-chair for Donald Trump's 2016 Campaign in Oklahoma
- Steve Russell, former U.S. representative
- Greg Treat, president pro tempore of the Oklahoma Senate

==== Endorsements ====
Stephanie Bice

Organizations

- Association of Oklahoma General Contractors
- Elevate PAC
- Empower America Project
- Maggie's List
- Oklahoma Right to Life
Terry Neese (eliminated)

State officials

- Guy Liebmann, former state representative and acting Oklahoma City mayor
- Leonard Sullivan, former state representative

Local officials

- Harry Currie, former Del City mayor
- Floyd Eason, Del City mayor
- Richard Finley, Shawnee mayor
- Larry Fryar, Harrah mayor
- Chuck Mills, former Shawnee mayor (2004-2008)
- Saundra Naifeh, former Edmond mayor (2001-2007)
- Mark Stonecipher, Oklahoma City vice mayor

Organizations

- RightNOW Women PAC
David Hill (eliminated)

Individuals

- Morton Blackwell, founder and president of the Leadership Institute
- Harold Hamm, founder and chairman of Continental Resources, Inc.

Organizations

- Conservative Leadership PAC
- FRC Action

==== Primary results ====
Republican primary results
Party	Candidate	Votes	%
Republican	Terry Neese	24,828	36.5
Republican	Stephanie Bice	17,292	25.4
Republican	David Hill	12,922	19.0
Republican	Janet Barresi	6,799	10.0
Republican	Jake A. Merrick	1,736	2.6
Republican	Michael Ballard	1,691	2.5
Republican	Miles V. Rahimi	967	1.4
Republican	Shelli Landon	912	1.3
Republican	Charles Tuffy Pringle	908	1.3
Total votes		68,055	100.0

==== Runoff results ====
Republican primary runoff results
Party	Candidate	Votes	%
Republican	Stephanie Bice	27,402	52.9
Republican	Terry Neese	24,369	47.1
Total votes		51,771	100.0

=== General election ===
==== Predictions ====
Source	Ranking	As of
The Cook Political Report	Tossup	September 11, 2020
Inside Elections	Tossup	September 4, 2020
Sabato's Crystal Ball	Lean D	November 2, 2020
Politico	Tossup	September 9, 2020
Daily Kos	Tossup	April 29, 2020
RCP	Tossup	September 14, 2020
Niskanen	Tossup	June 7, 2020

==== Polling ====
View source data.

Poll source	Date(s) administered	Sample size	Margin of error	Kendra Horn (D)	Stephanie Bice (R)	Other/ Undecided
Change Research	October 29 – November 1, 2020	607 (LV)	± 4.4%	47%	47%	7% (Note: Did not vote, "Don't recall," and would not vote with 1%; Undecided with 4%)
Amber Integrated	October 22–25, 2020	500 (LV)	± 4.38%	44%	49%	8%
Sooner Poll	October 15–20, 2020	943 (LV)	–	49%	47%	4% (Note: Undecided with 4%)
Cole, Snodgrass & Associates/SoonerPoll	September 25–30, 2020	500 (LV)	± 4.3%	45%	49%	6% (Note: Undecided with 6%)
SoonerPoll	September 2–10, 2020	318 (LV)	± 5.49%	44%	45%	11%
Normington, Petts & Associates (D) (Note: Poll sponsored by Horn's campaign.)	August 31 – September 3, 2020	400 (LV)	± 4.9%	52%	44%	4%
DCCC Targeting & Analytics Department (D) (Note: Poll conducted for the DCCC.)	August 5–9, 2020	500 (LV)	± 4.4%	51%	46%	11%

Hypothetical polling

Polls with a sample size of <100 have their sample size entries marked in red to indicate a lack of reliability. with Generic Republican

Poll source	Date(s) administered	Sample size	Margin of error	Kendra Horn (D)	Generic Republican	Undecided
Amber Integrated	June 1–4, 2020	95 (LV)	–	42%	41%	18%
Amber Integrated	March 5–8, 2020	89 (LV)	–	40%	44%	16%
Amber Integrated (R)	December 18–20, 2019	500 (RV)	± 4.4%	40%	45%	15%

with Generic Opponent

Poll source	Date(s) administered	Sample size	Margin of error	Kendra Horn (D)	Generic Opponent	Other	Undecided
Fabrizio, Lee & Associates (R) (Note: Poll sponsored by Parscale, the manager of Trump's 2020 presidential campaign)	December 3–4, 2019	300 (LV)	± 5.66%	37%	49% (Note: "It is time to give a new person a chance to do better" with 49% as opposed to "Horn has performed her job as Congresswoman well enough to deserve re-election")	2% (Note: "Refused" with 2%)	12% (Note: "Unsure/depends" with 12%)

with Generic Democrat and Generic Republican

Poll source	Date(s) administered	Sample size	Margin of error	Generic Democrat	Generic Republican	Undecided
Fabrizio, Lee & Associates	December 3–4, 2019	300 (LV)	± 5.66%	42%	49%	9% (Note: "Undecided" with 7%; "don't know/refused" with 2%)

==== Results ====
Oklahoma's 5th congressional district, 2020
Party	Candidate	Votes	%
Republican	Stephanie Bice	158,191	52.06
Democratic	Kendra Horn (incumbent)	145,658	47.94
Total votes		303,849	100.00
Republican gain from Democratic			

== Notes ==
Partisan clients
