= Nebraska Republican presidential primary results =

This is a list of the Nebraska Republican Party presidential primary results.

== 1912 ==
Nebraska Republican primary, 1912
Candidate	Votes	Percentage
Theodore Roosevelt		58.7%
William Howard Taft		21.5%
Robert La Follette		17.1%

== 1916 ==
Nebraska Republican primary, April 18, 1916
Candidate	Votes	Percentage
Albert B. Cummins	29,850	33.7%
Henry Ford	26,884	30.3%
Charles Evans Hughes (Write-in)	15,837	17.9%
Theodore Roosevelt (Write-in)	2,256	2.5%

== 1920 ==
Nebraska Republican primary, April 20, 1920
Candidate	Votes	Percentage
Hiram Johnson	63,161	46.2%
Leonard Wood	42,385	31.0%
John J. Pershing	27,669	20.3%

== 1924 ==
Nebraska Republican primary, April 8, 1924
Candidate	Votes	Percentage
President Calvin Coolidge	79,676	63.6%
Hiram Johnson	45,032	35.9%

== 1928 ==
Nebraska Republican primary, April 10, 1928
Candidate	Votes	Percentage
George Norris	96,726	91.8%
Herbert Hoover	6,815	6.5%
Frank Orren Lowden	711	0.7%
Charles G. Dawes	679	0.7%
Calvin Coolidge	452	0.4%

== 1932 ==
Nebraska Republican primary, April 12, 1932
Candidate	Votes	Percentage
Joseph I. France	40,481	74.4%
President Herbert Hoover	13,934	25.6%

== 1936 ==
Nebraska Republican primary, April 14, 1936
Candidate	Votes	Percentage
William Borah	70,240	74.5%
Alf Landon	23,117	24.5%

== 1940 ==
Nebraska Republican primary, April 9, 1940
Candidate	Votes	Percentage
Thomas Dewey	102,915	58.9%
Arthur Vandenberg	71,798	41.1%

== 1944 ==
Nebraska Republican primary, April 11, 1944
Candidate	Votes	Percentage
Harold Stassen	51,800	65.7%
Thomas Dewey	18,418	23.3%
Wendell Willkie	8,249	10.5%

== 1948 ==
Nebraska Republican primary, April 13, 1948
Candidate	Votes	Percentage
Harold Stassen	80,979	43.5%
Thomas Dewey	64,242	34.5%
Robert Taft	21,608	11.6%
Arthur Vandenberg	9,590	5.2%
Douglas MacArthur	6,893	3.7%
Earl Warren	1,761	0.9%
Joseph W. Martin	910	0.5%

== 1952 ==
Nebraska Republican primary, April 1, 1952
Candidate	Votes	Percentage
Robert Taft (Write-in)	79,357	36.2%
Dwight D. Eisenhower (Write-in)	66,078	30.1%
Harold Stassen	53,238	24.3%
Douglas MacArthur (Write-in)	7,478	3.4%
Earl Warren (Write-in)	1,872	0.9%

== 1956 ==
Nebraska Republican primary, May 15, 1956
Candidate	Votes	Percentage
President Dwight D. Eisenhower	102,576	99.8%

== 1960 ==
Nebraska Republican primary, May 10, 1960
Candidate	Votes	Percentage
Vice President Richard Nixon	74,356	93.8%
Nelson Rockefeller (Write-in)	2,028	2.6%
Barry Goldwater (Write-in)	1,068	1.3%

== 1964 ==
Nebraska Republican primary, May 12, 1964
Candidate	Votes	Percentage
Barry Goldwater	68,050	49.1%
Richard Nixon (Write-in)	43,613	31.5%
Henry Cabot Lodge Jr. (Write-in)	22,622	16.3%
Nelson Rockefeller (Write-in)	2,333	1.7%
William P. Scranton (Write-in)	578	0.4%
Lyndon B. Johnson (Write-in)	316	0.2%

== 1968 ==
Nebraska Republican primary, May 14, 1968
Candidate	Votes	Percentage
Richard Nixon	140,336	70.0%
Ronald Reagan	42,703	21.3%
Nelson Rockefeller (Write-in)	10,225	5.1%
Harold Stassen	2,638	1.3%
Eugene McCarthy (Write-in)	1,544	0.8%

== 1972 ==
Nebraska Republican primary, May 9, 1972
Candidate	Votes	Percentage
President Richard Nixon	179,464	92.4%
Pete McCloskey	9,011	4.6%
John M. Ashbrook	4,996	2.6%

== 1976 ==
Nebraska Republican primary, May 11, 1976
Candidate	Votes	Percentage
Ronald Reagan	113,493	54.5%
President Gerald Ford	94,542	45.4%

== 1980 ==
Nebraska Republican primary, May 13, 1980
Candidate	Votes	Percentage
Ronald Reagan	155,995	76.0%
George H. W. Bush	31,380	15.3%
John Anderson	11,879	5.8%
Bob Dole	1,420	0.7%
Phil Crane	1,062	0.5%
Harold Stassen	799	0.4%
Ben Fernandez	400	0.2%

== 1984 ==
Nebraska Republican primary, May 15, 1984
Candidate	Votes	Percentage
President Ronald Reagan	145,245	99.9%

== 1988 ==
Nebraska Republican primary, May 10, 1988
Candidate	Votes	Percentage
Vice President George H. W. Bush	138,784	68.0%
Bob Dole	45,572	22.3%
Pat Robertson	10,334	5.1%
Jack Kemp	8,423	4.1%

== 1992 ==
Nebraska Republican primary, May 12, 1992
Candidate	Votes	Percentage
President George H. W. Bush	156,346	81.4%
Pat Buchanan	25,847	13.5%
David Duke	2,808	1.5%
George A. Zimmermann	1,313	0.7%
Tennie Rogers	751	0.4%

== 1996 ==
Nebraska Republican primary, May 14, 1996
Candidate	Votes	Percentage
Bob Dole	129,131	75.7%
Pat Buchanan	17,741	10.4%
Steve Forbes (withdrawn)	10,612	6.2%
Alan Keyes (withdrawn)	5,123	3.0%
Lamar Alexander (withdrawn)	4,423	2.6%
Richard Lugar (withdrawn)	1,127	0.7%
Robert Dornan (withdrawn)	847	0.5%
Morry Taylor	460	0.3%

== 2000 ==
Nebraska Republican primary, May 9, 2000
Candidate	Votes	Percentage
George W. Bush	145,176	78.15%
John McCain (withdrawn)	28,065	15.11%
Alan Keyes	12,073	6.50%

== 2004 ==
Nebraska Republican primary, May 11, 2004
Candidate	Votes	Percentage
President George W. Bush	121,355	100.00%

== 2008 ==
Nebraska Republican primary, May 13, 2008
Candidate	Votes	Percentage
John McCain	118,876	86.99%
Ron Paul	17,772	13.00%

== 2012 ==
Nebraska Republican primary, May 15, 2012
Candidate	Votes	Percentage
Mitt Romney	131,436	70.89%
Rick Santorum (withdrawn)	25,830	13.93%
Ron Paul	18,508	9.98%
Newt Gingrich (withdrawn)	9,628	5.19%

== 2016 ==
Nebraska Republican primary, May 10, 2016
Candidate	Votes	Percentage
Donald Trump	122,327	61.47%
Ted Cruz (withdrawn)	36,703	18.44%
John Kasich (withdrawn)	22,709	11.41%
Ben Carson (withdrawn)	10,016	5.03%
Marco Rubio (withdrawn)	7,233	3.63%
Total	198,988	99.98%

== 2020 ==
Nebraska Republican primary, May 13, 2020
Candidate	Votes	Percentage
Donald Trump	242,035	90.7%
Bill Weld (withdrawn)	22,831	8.6%
Write-in	1,853	0.7%
Total	266,719	100%

== 2024 ==
Nebraska Republican primary, May 14, 2024
Candidate	Votes	Percentage
Donald Trump	167,968	79.3%
Nikki Haley (withdrawn)	38,246	18.1%
Perry Johnson (withdrawn)	3,902	1.8%
Write-in	1,671	0.8%
Total	211,787	100%
