= 2016 United States House of Representatives elections in Oklahoma =

- November 8, 2016

All 5 Oklahoma seats to the United States House of Representatives
	Majority party	Minority party
Party	Republican	Democratic
Last election	5	0
Seats won	5	0
Seat change	Steady	Steady
Popular vote	781,691	305,222
Percentage	68.98%	26.93%
Swing	▼1.05%	▲0.30%
- Republican 50–60% 60–70% 70–80% 80–90% >90%

The 2016 United States House of Representatives elections in Oklahoma occurred on November 8, 2016. Voters determined five candidates to serve in the U.S. House, one from each of the state's five congressional districts. The primaries were held on June 28.

== Results summary ==
=== Statewide ===
Popular vote
Republican	68.98%
Democratic	26.93%
Libertarian	2.62%
Independent	1.47%

House seats
Republican	100.00%
Democratic	0.00%

=== District ===
District	Democratic		Republican		Others		Total		Result
District	Votes	%	Votes	%	Votes	%	Votes	%	Result
District 1	-	-	-	100.00%	-	-	-	100.00%	Republican hold
District 2	62,387	23.2%	189,389	70.6%	16,644	6.2%	268,870	100.00%	Republican hold
District 3	63,090	21.7%	227,525	78.3%	-	-	290,615	100.00%	Republican hold
District 4	76,472	26.1%	204,143	69.6%	12,574	4.3%	293,189	100.00%	Republican hold
District 5	103,273	36.8%	160,184	57.1%	17,113	6.1%	280,570	100.00%	Republican hold
Total	305,222	26.93%	781,691	68.98%	46,331	4.09%	1,133,244	100.00%	

== District 1 ==
2016 Oklahoma's 1st congressional district election
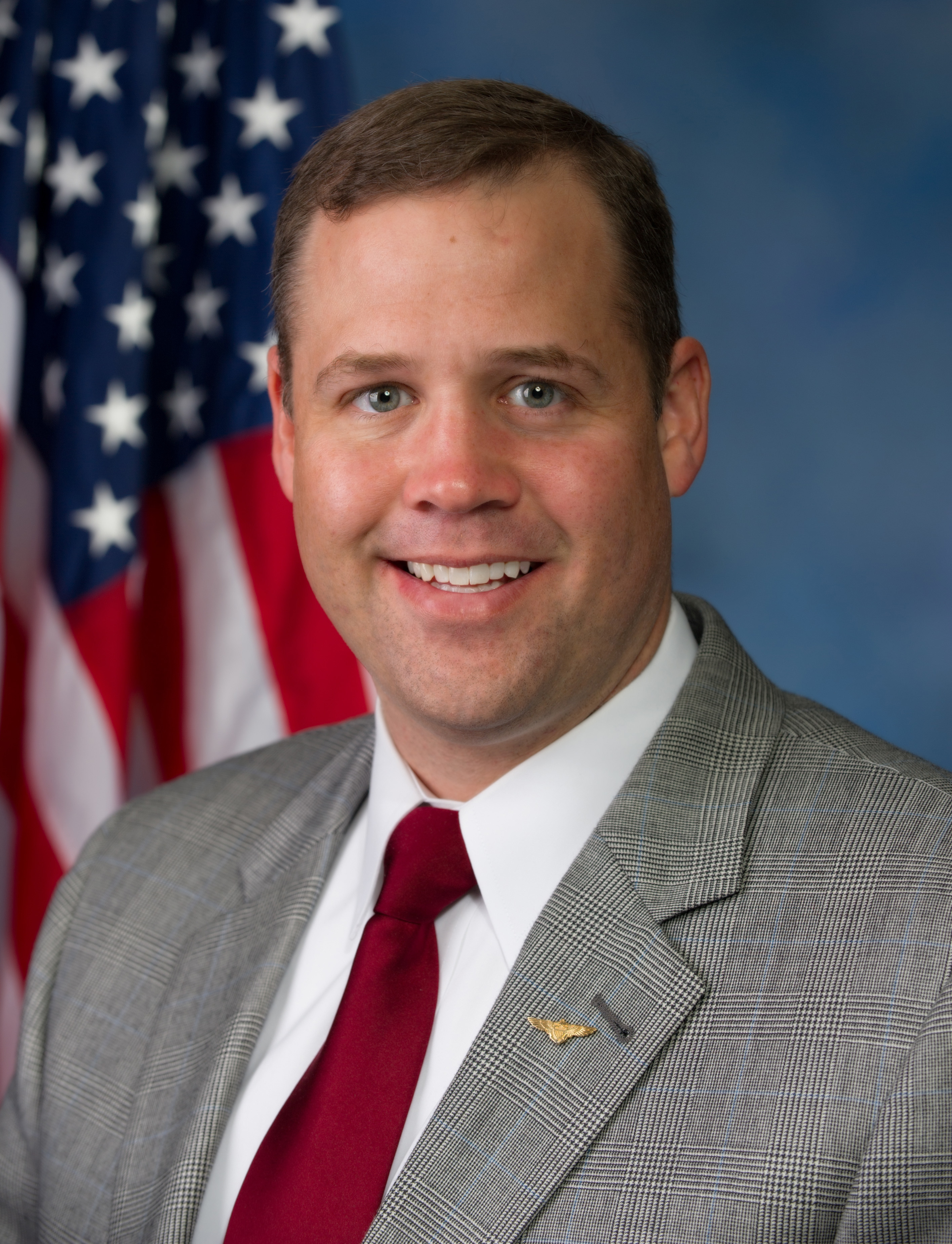
Nominee	Jim Bridenstine
Party	Republican
Popular vote	Unopposed
Percentage	N/a
U.S. Representative before election
Jim Bridenstine
Republican
Elected U.S. Representative
Jim Bridenstine
Republican

The 1st district is located in the Tulsa metropolitan area and includes Creek, Rogers, Tulsa, Wagoner and Washington counties. The incumbent is Republican Jim Bridenstine, who has represented the district since 2013. He ran unopposed in 2014. The district has a PVI of R+18.

=== Republican primary ===
==== Candidates ====
===== Nominee =====
- Jim Bridenstine, incumbent U.S. Representative

===== Eliminated in primary =====
- Tom Atkinson
- Evelyn Rogers

==== Results ====
Republican primary results
Party	Candidate	Votes	%
Republican	Jim Bridenstine (incumbent)	50,595	80.7
Republican	Tom Atkinson	10,056	16.1
Republican	Evelyn Rogers	2,004	3.2
Total votes		62,655	100.0

=== Independents ===
==== Candidates ====
===== Withdrawn =====
- David Matthew Hullum

=== General election ===
==== Predictions ====
Source	Ranking	As of
The Cook Political Report	Safe R	November 7, 2016
Daily Kos Elections	Safe R	November 7, 2016
Rothenberg	Safe R	November 3, 2016
Sabato's Crystal Ball	Safe R	November 7, 2016
RCP	Safe R	October 31, 2016

==== Results ====
Oklahoma's 1st congressional district election, 2016
Party	Candidate	Votes	%
Republican	Jim Bridenstine (incumbent)	Unopposed	N/a
Total votes			N/a
Republican hold			

== District 2 ==
2016 Oklahoma's 2nd congressional district election
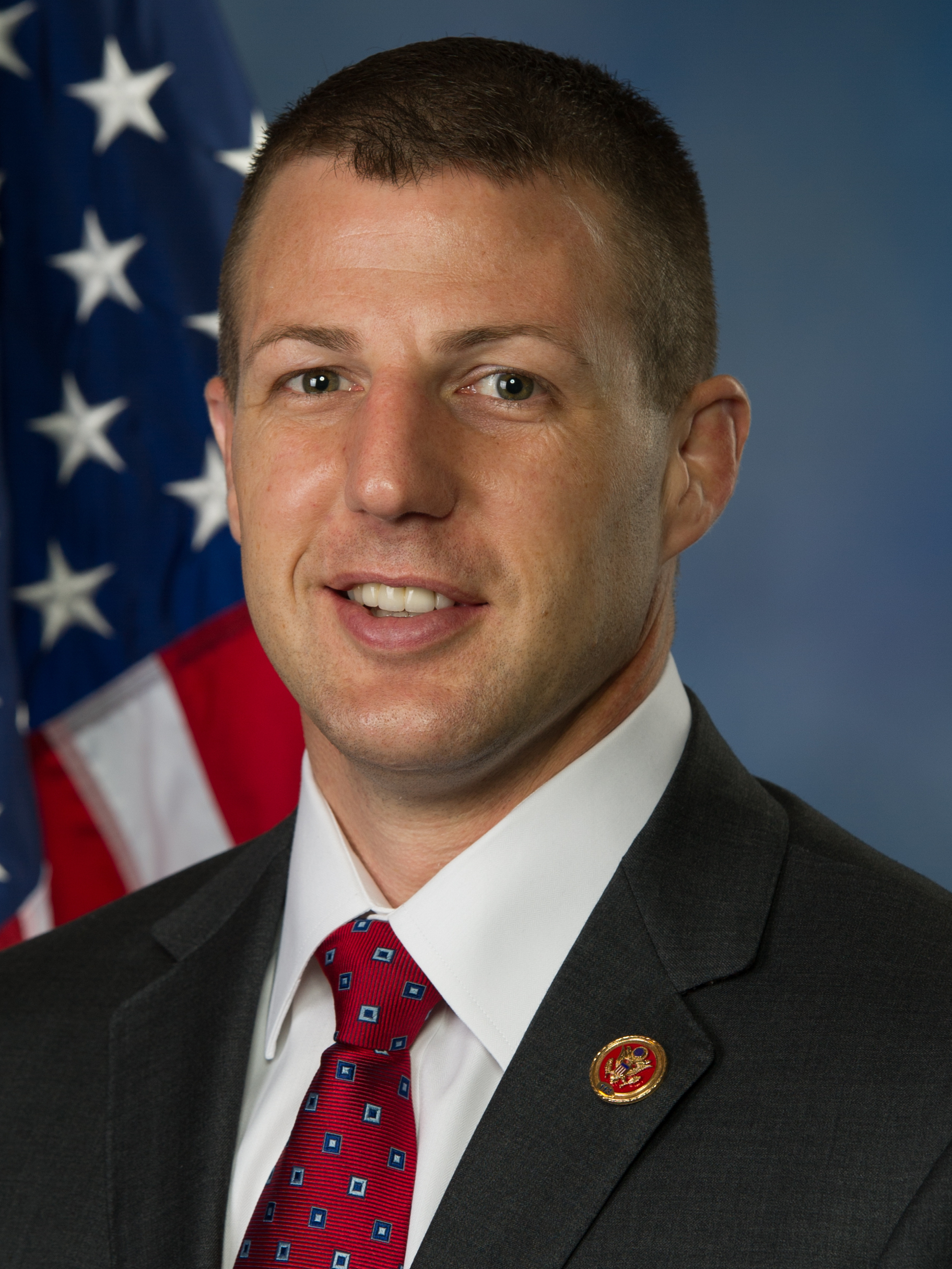

Nominee	Markwayne Mullin	Joshua Harris-Till	John McCarthy
Party	Republican	Democratic	Independent
Popular vote	189,389	62,387	16,644
Percentage	70.6%	23.2%	6.2%
- Precinct and county-level results Mullin: 40–50% 50–60% 60–70% 70–80% 80–90% Harris-Till: 40–50% 50–60% 60–70% 70–80% ≥90% No votes
U.S. Representative before election
Markwayne Mullin
Republican
Elected U.S. Representative
Markwayne Mullin
Republican

The 2nd district is located in Green Country and Kiamichi Country and includes the city of Muskogee and numerous sparsely populated counties. The incumbent is Republican Markwayne Mullin, who has represented the district since 2013. He was elected with 70% of the vote in 2014. The district has a PVI of R+20.

=== Republican primary ===
==== Candidates ====
===== Nominee =====
- Markwayne Mullin, incumbent U.S. Representative

===== Eliminated in primary =====
- Jarrin Jackson

==== Results ====
Republican primary results
Party	Candidate	Votes	%
Republican	Markwayne Mullin (incumbent)	20,065	63.4
Republican	Jarrin Jackson	11,580	36.6
Total votes		31,645	100.0

=== Democratic primary ===
==== Candidates ====
===== Declared =====
- Joshua Harris-Till, candidate for this seat in 2014

===== Eliminated in primary =====
- Paul Schiefelbein

==== Results ====
Democratic primary results
Party	Candidate	Votes	%
Democratic	Joshua Harris-Till	31,681	60.0
Democratic	Paul Schiefelbein	21,152	40.0
Total votes		52,833	100.0

=== Independents ===
==== Candidates ====
- John McCarthy

=== General election ===
==== Predictions ====
Source	Ranking	As of
The Cook Political Report	Safe R	November 7, 2016
Daily Kos Elections	Safe R	November 7, 2016
Rothenberg	Safe R	November 3, 2016
Sabato's Crystal Ball	Safe R	November 7, 2016
RCP	Safe R	October 31, 2016

==== Results ====
Oklahoma's 2nd congressional district, 2016
Party	Candidate	Votes	%
Republican	Markwayne Mullin (incumbent)	189,839	70.6
Democratic	Joshua Harris-Till	62,387	23.2
Independent	John McCarthy	16,644	6.2
Total votes		268,870	100.0
Republican hold			

== District 3 ==
2016 Oklahoma's 3rd congressional district election
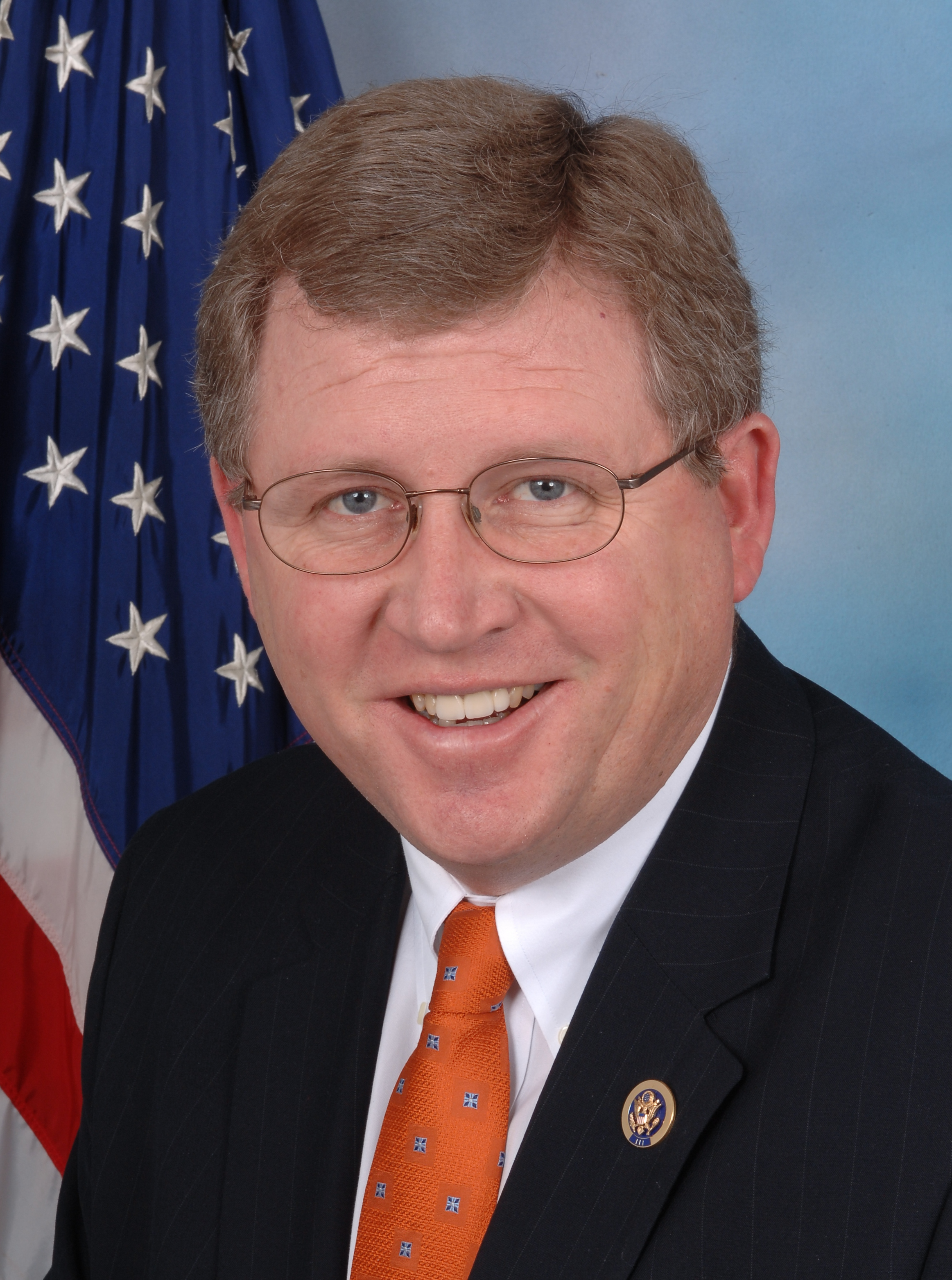

Nominee	Frank Lucas	Frankie Robbins
Party	Republican	Democratic
Popular vote	227,525	63,090
Percentage	78.3%	21.7%
- Precinct and county-level results Lucas: 50–60% 60–70% 70–80% 80–90% ≥90% Robbins: 50–60% 60–70% 80–90% ≥90% No votes
U.S. Representative before election
Frank Lucas
Republican
Elected U.S. Representative
Frank Lucas
Republican

The 3rd district is located in Western Oklahoma. The largest district in Oklahoma and one of the largest in the country, it includes the Oklahoma Panhandle, Ponca City and the city of Stillwater as well as the Osage Nation. The incumbent is Republican Frank Lucas, who has represented the district since 2003 and previously represented the 6th district from 1994 to 2003. He was re-elected with 78% of the vote in 2014 and the district has a PVI of R+26.

Republican Frank Lucas ran unopposed in the Republican primary. Democrat Frankie Robbins, an engineer and United States Forest Service employee who was a candidate for the seat in 2014 and the nominee for the seat in 2008, 2010 and 2012 is the only other candidate running.

=== Republican primary ===
==== Candidates ====
===== Nominee =====
- Frank Lucas, incumbent U.S. Representative

===== Eliminated in primary =====
- Desiree Brown

==== Results ====
Republican primary results
Party	Candidate	Votes	%
Republican	Frank Lucas (incumbent)	42,027	78.0
Republican	Desiree Brown	11,891	22.0
Total votes		53,918	100.0

=== General election ===
==== Predictions ====
Source	Ranking	As of
The Cook Political Report	Safe R	November 7, 2016
Daily Kos Elections	Safe R	November 7, 2016
Rothenberg	Safe R	November 3, 2016
Sabato's Crystal Ball	Safe R	November 7, 2016
RCP	Safe R	October 31, 2016

==== Results ====
Oklahoma's 3rd congressional district, 2016
Party	Candidate	Votes	%
Republican	Frank Lucas (incumbent)	227,525	78.3
Democratic	Frankie Robbins	63,090	21.7
Total votes		290,615	100.0
Republican hold			

== District 4 ==
2016 Oklahoma's 4th congressional district election
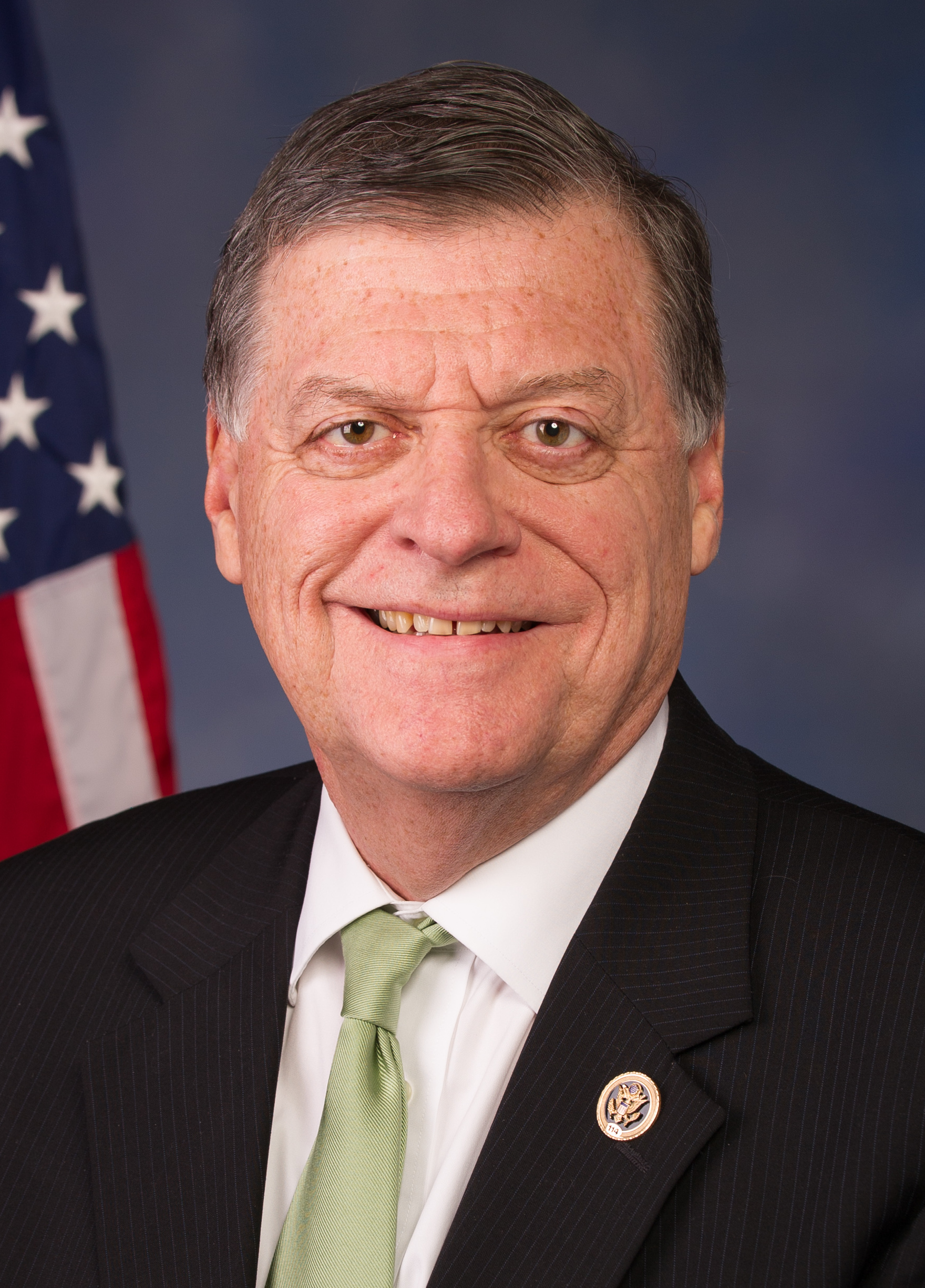

Nominee	Tom Cole	Christina Owen
Party	Republican	Democratic
Popular vote	204,143	76,472
Percentage	69.6%	26.1%
- Precinct and county-level results Cole: 40–50% 50–60% 60–70% 70–80% 80–90% ≥90% Owen: 40–50% 50–60% 60–70% 70–80% 80–90% No votes
U.S. Representative before election
Tom Cole
Republican
Elected U.S. Representative
Tom Cole
Republican

The 4th district is located in South Central Oklahoma and includes Canadian, Comanche and Cleveland counties as well as numerous other sparsely populated counties. The incumbent is Republican Tom Cole, who has represented the district since 2003. He was re-elected with 70% of the vote in 2014 and the district has a PVI of R+19.

=== Republican primary ===
==== Candidates ====
===== Nominee =====
- Tom Cole, incumbent U.S. Representative

===== Eliminated in primary =====
- Shawn Roberts
- James Taylor

==== Results ====
Republican primary results
Party	Candidate	Votes	%
Republican	Tom Cole (incumbent)	28,813	71.4
Republican	James Taylor	7,398	18.3
Republican	Shawn Roberts	4,151	10.3
Total votes		40,362	100.0

=== Democratic primary ===
==== Candidates ====
===== Nominee =====
- Christina Owen

===== Eliminated in primary =====
- Bert Smith, retired teacher, retired United States Army Reserve lieutenant colonel and perennial candidate

==== Results ====
Democratic primary results
Party	Candidate	Votes	%
Democratic	Christina Owen	16,314	62.2
Democratic	Bert Smith	9,922	37.8
Total votes		26,236	100.0

=== General election ===
==== Predictions ====
Source	Ranking	As of
The Cook Political Report	Safe R	November 7, 2016
Daily Kos Elections	Safe R	November 7, 2016
Rothenberg	Safe R	November 3, 2016
Sabato's Crystal Ball	Safe R	November 7, 2016
RCP	Safe R	October 31, 2016

==== Results ====
Oklahoma's 4th congressional district, 2016
Party	Candidate	Votes	%
Republican	Tom Cole (incumbent)	204,143	69.6
Democratic	Christina Owen	76,472	26.1
Libertarian	Sevier White	12,574	4.3
Total votes		293,189	100.0
Republican hold			

== District 5 ==
2016 Oklahoma's 5th congressional district election
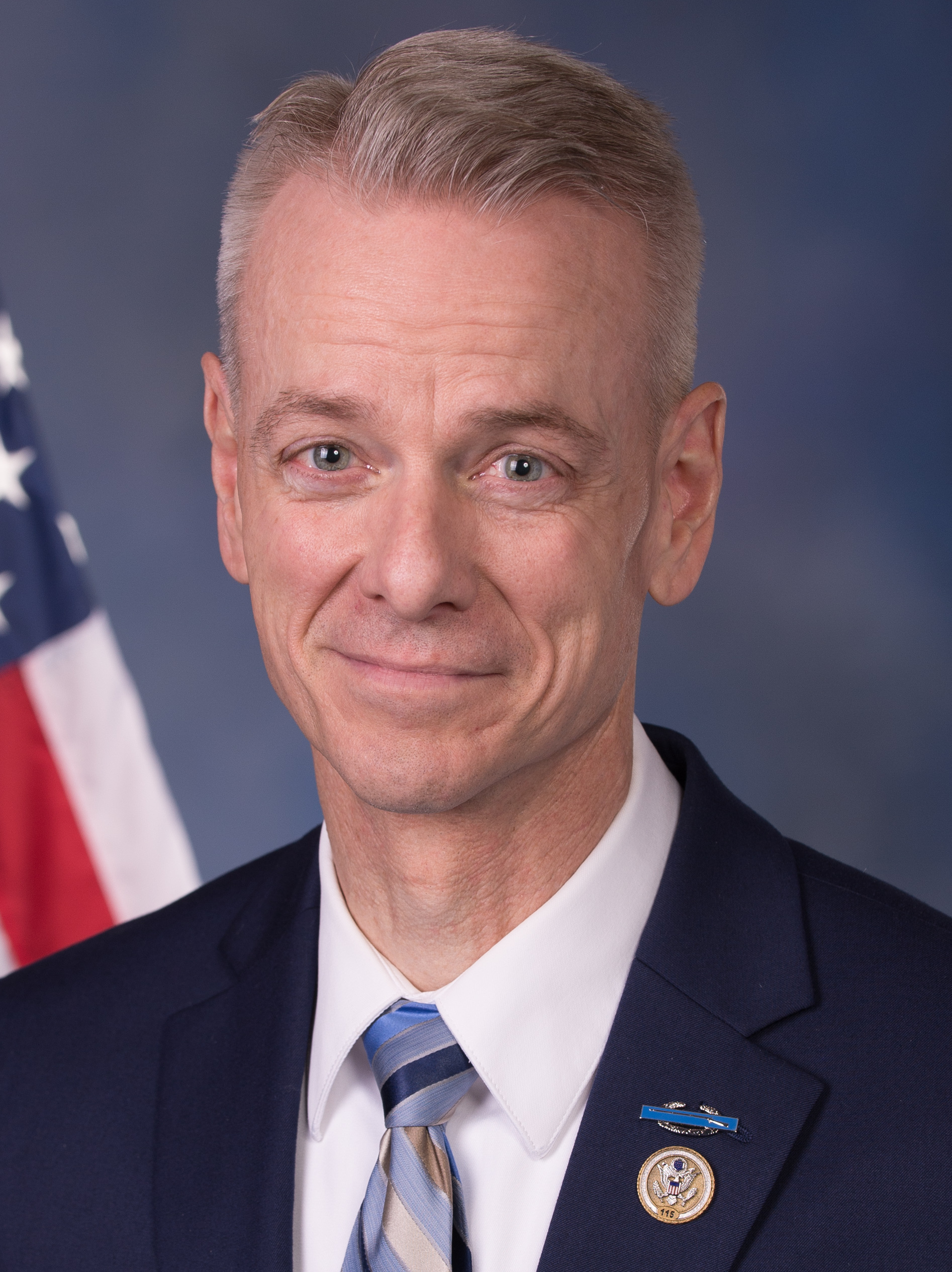

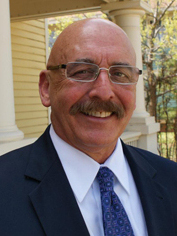

Nominee	Steve Russell	Al McAffrey	Zachary Knight
Party	Republican	Democratic	Libertarian
Popular vote	160,184	103,273	17,113
Percentage	57.1%	36.8%	6.1%
- Precinct and county-level results Russell: 40–50% 50–60% 60–70% 70–80% 80–90% McAffrey: 40–50% 50–60% 60–70% 70–80% 80–90% ≥90% No votes
U.S. Representative before election
Steve Russell
Republican
Elected U.S. Representative
Steve Russell
Republican

The 5th district is located in Central Oklahoma and includes Oklahoma, Pottawatomie and Seminole counties. The incumbent in 2016 was Republican Steve Russell, who had represented the district since 2014. He was elected with 60% of the vote in 2014 after having defeated five Republican candidates in the primary and Republican Patrice Douglas again in the Republican primary runoff with 59% of the vote. The district had a PVI of R+12.

=== Republican primary ===
==== Candidates ====
===== Nominee =====
- Steve Russell, incumbent U.S. Representative

===== Eliminated in primary =====
- Frank Volpe

==== Results ====
Republican primary results
Party	Candidate	Votes	%
Republican	Steve Russell (incumbent)	27,436	80.3
Republican	Frank Volpe	6,721	19.7
Total votes		34,157	100.0

=== Democratic primary ===
==== Candidates ====
===== Nominee =====
- Al McAffrey, state senator and nominee for this seat in 2014

===== Eliminated in primary =====
- Tom Guild, University of Central Oklahoma professor, nominee for the seat in 2010 & 2012 and candidate for this seat in 2014
- Leona Leonard, chair of the Seminole County Democratic Party and candidate for this seat in 2014

==== Results ====
Democratic primary results
Party	Candidate	Votes	%
Democratic	Al McAffrey	10,013	36.81
Democratic	Tom Guild	10,000	36.76
Democratic	Leona Leonard	7,190	26.43
Total votes		27,203	100.0

==== Runoff results ====
Democratic primary runoff results
Party	Candidate	Votes	%
Democratic	Al McAffrey	8,032	50.1
Democratic	Tom Guild	7,988	49.9
Total votes		16,010	100.0

=== Libertarian candidates ===
==== Candidates ====
===== Nominee =====
- Zachary Knight

=== General election ===
==== Predictions ====
Source	Ranking	As of
The Cook Political Report	Safe R	November 7, 2016
Daily Kos Elections	Safe R	November 7, 2016
Rothenberg	Safe R	November 3, 2016
Sabato's Crystal Ball	Safe R	November 7, 2016
RCP	Safe R	October 31, 2016

==== Results ====
Oklahoma's 5th congressional district, 2016
Party	Candidate	Votes	%
Republican	Steve Russell (incumbent)	160,184	57.1
Democratic	Al McAffrey	103,273	36.8
Libertarian	Zachary Knight	17,113	6.1
Total votes		280,570	100.0
Republican hold			

== See also ==
- 2016 United States Senate election in Oklahoma
- 2016 United States House of Representatives elections
