= Markwayne Mullin =

American politician and businessman (born 1977)

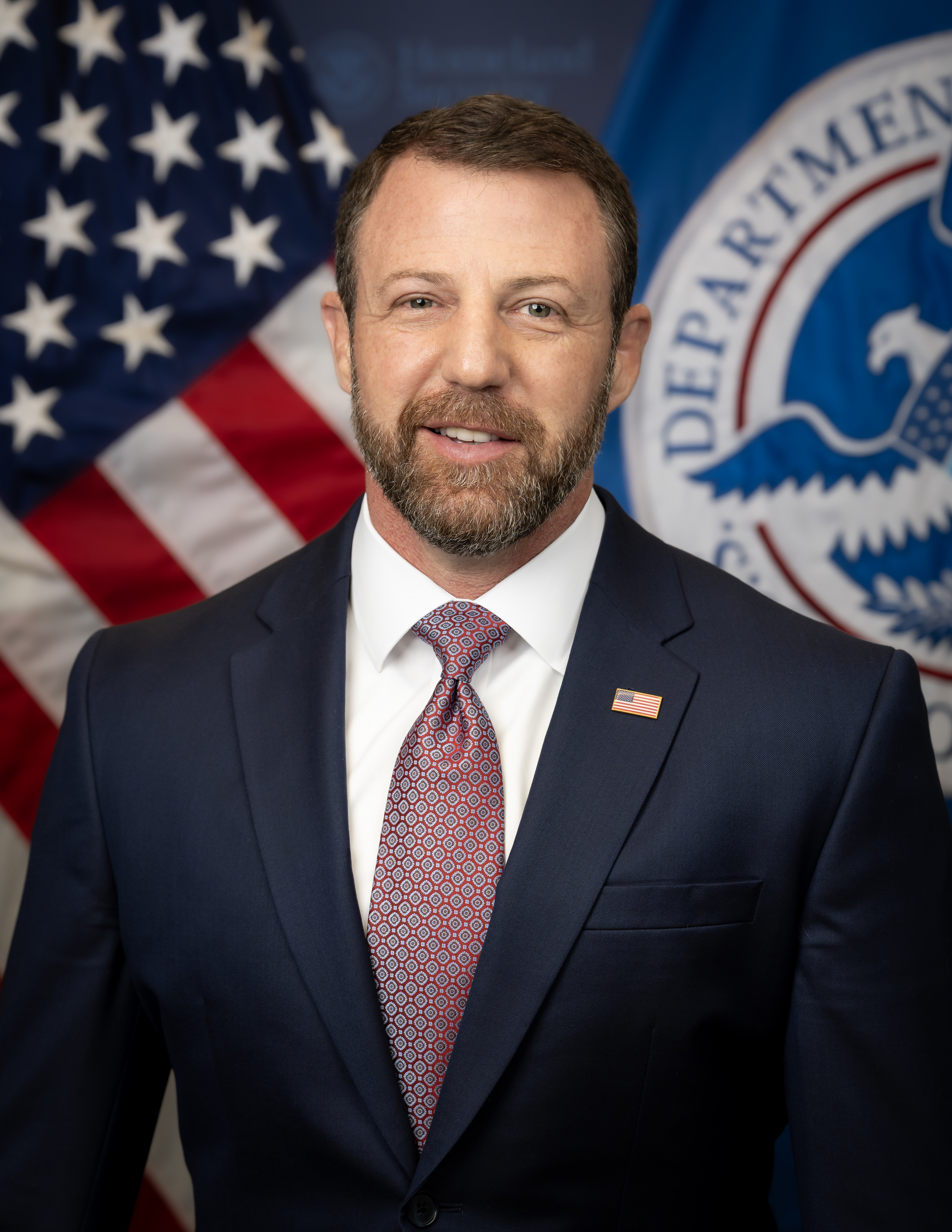
- Official portrait, 2026

9th United States Secretary of Homeland Security
- Incumbent
- Assumed office March 24, 2026
- President: Donald Trump
- Deputy: Troy Edgar
- Preceded by: Kristi Noem

United States Senator from Oklahoma
- In office January 3, 2023 – March 23, 2026
- Preceded by: Jim Inhofe
- Succeeded by: Alan Armstrong

Member of the U.S. House of Representatives from Oklahoma's 2nd district
- In office January 3, 2013 – January 3, 2023
- Preceded by: Dan Boren
- Succeeded by: Josh Brecheen

Personal details
- Born: July 26, 1977 (age 49) Tulsa, Oklahoma, U.S.
- Citizenship: American; Cherokee Nation
- Party: Republican
- Spouse: Christie Rowan (m. 1997)
- Children: 6
- Education: Oklahoma State University Institute of Technology (AAS)
- Mullin's voice Mullin's opening statement during his confirmation hearing to become secretary of homeland security Recorded March 18, 2026

Markwayne Mullin (born July 26, 1977) is an American politician and businessman who has served as the 9th United States secretary of homeland security since 2026. A member of the Republican Party, Mullin served from 2023 to 2026 as the junior United States senator from Oklahoma and from 2013 to 2023 as the U.S. representative for Oklahoma's second congressional district.

A member of the Cherokee Nation, Mullin assumed control of his family's plumbing business in 1998. After entering the 2012 United States House of Representatives election for Oklahoma's second congressional district in 2011, he defeated Democratic candidate Rob Wallace. He was reelected in 2014, 2016, 2018, and 2020.

In February 2022, Oklahoma senator Jim Inhofe announced that he would resign at the end of the 117th United States Congress. Mullin ran in the special election to succeed Inhofe. He won the Republican primary and the resulting runoff election against state House speaker T. W. Shannon, and defeated Democratic nominee Kendra Horn in the general election. He became the first tribal citizen to serve in the United States Senate since Colorado senator Ben Nighthorse Campbell retired in 2005.

In March 2026, President Donald Trump announced that he had fired Secretary of Homeland Security Kristi Noem after her alleged misuse of government funds. Trump nominated Mullin to succeed Noem. Mullin was confirmed by the Senate and sworn in that month. He is the first member of the Cherokee Nation to serve in the Cabinet of the United States.

== Early life and education ==
Markwayne Mullin was born on July 26, 1977, in Tulsa, Oklahoma. Mullin was the youngest of seven children. He was named after two of his uncles, Mark and Wayne. Mullin was raised in Westville, Oklahoma. Mullin is Cherokee through his maternal grandfather Kenneth Morris, and an enrolled member of the Cherokee Nation; his ancestry includes Native Americans who arrived in Oklahoma both before and after the Trail of Tears as part of the larger Indian removal. In his youth, Mullin had a speech impediment and clubfoot, forcing him to wear leg braces.

Mullin attended Stilwell High School, where he wrestled, graduating in 1996. Mullin attended Missouri Valley College on a wrestling scholarship. As his father's health deteriorated, Mullin left college in 1998 to take control of his family's business. Mullin received an Associate in Applied Science in plumbing from the Oklahoma State University Institute of Technology in 2010.

== Career ==
=== Businesses (1997–2021) ===
In 1997, Mullin assumed control of his family's plumbing business, Mullin Plumbing. The business had six employees at the time. His wife, Christie, postponed her degree to assist Mullin. By July 2011, Mullin Plumbing had become Oklahoma's largest plumbing service company. Mullin also owned Mullin Environmental, Mullin Services, and Mullin Properties, and ranches in Adair and Wagoner Counties. According to The Oklahoman, he owned eight businesses by July 2013. In December 2021, Mullin sold his businesses to CenterOak Partners, a private equity firm based in Dallas. His family continued to operate the plumbing business.

In September 2012, the Associated Press reported that Mullin Plumbing had received about $370,000 in federal stimulus funds through the Cherokee and Muscogee Nations. Mullin said he was not made aware of the source of the funds; The Tulsa World obtained records from the Cherokee Nation indicating that the firm was aware, but not Mullin. During the COVID-19 pandemic, Mullin Plumbing accepted between $350,000 and $1 million in Paycheck Protection Program (PPP) loans. In August 2022, the White House's Twitter account, then operated by the Biden administration, criticized Mullin for having $1.4 million in PPP loans forgiven.

=== Mixed martial arts (2006–2007) ===
Mullin was a professional mixed martial arts fighter between 2006 and 2007. He claimed a 5–0 record in his brief career. Bobby Kelley, who fought Mullin in 2006, told The New York Times that he considered Mullin "one of the best welterweights around" in the four-state area. Mullin was inducted into the National Wrestling Hall of Fame in 2016. He operated the Oklahoma Fight Club, a jujutsu and mixed martial arts school in Broken Arrow, Oklahoma, by 2012.

=== Radio program (2011–2012) ===
By 2011, Mullin had begun hosting House Talk, a call-in radio program for home improvement. The New York Times described the program as similar to NPR's Car Talk. House Talk had several guest hosts; one, Daryl Brown, told the Times that Mullin required those he invited on the show to "prepare meticulously". House Talk was syndicated on Saturday mornings on KFAQ.

=== Alleged private security work ===
In March 2026, Axios reported that Mullin had privately suggested to colleagues that he was involved in private security work for the U.S. government in the Middle East; the claim had not been made in his campaigns or websites. A spokesperson for Mullin told Axios that he had participated in mission work and mentorship support. After he called war "ugly" and said it "smells bad" on Fox News, Mullin clarified on The Clay Travis and Buck Sexton Show that he was referring to special assignments outside the Department of Defense.

== U.S. House of Representatives (2013–2023) ==
=== Initial campaign ===
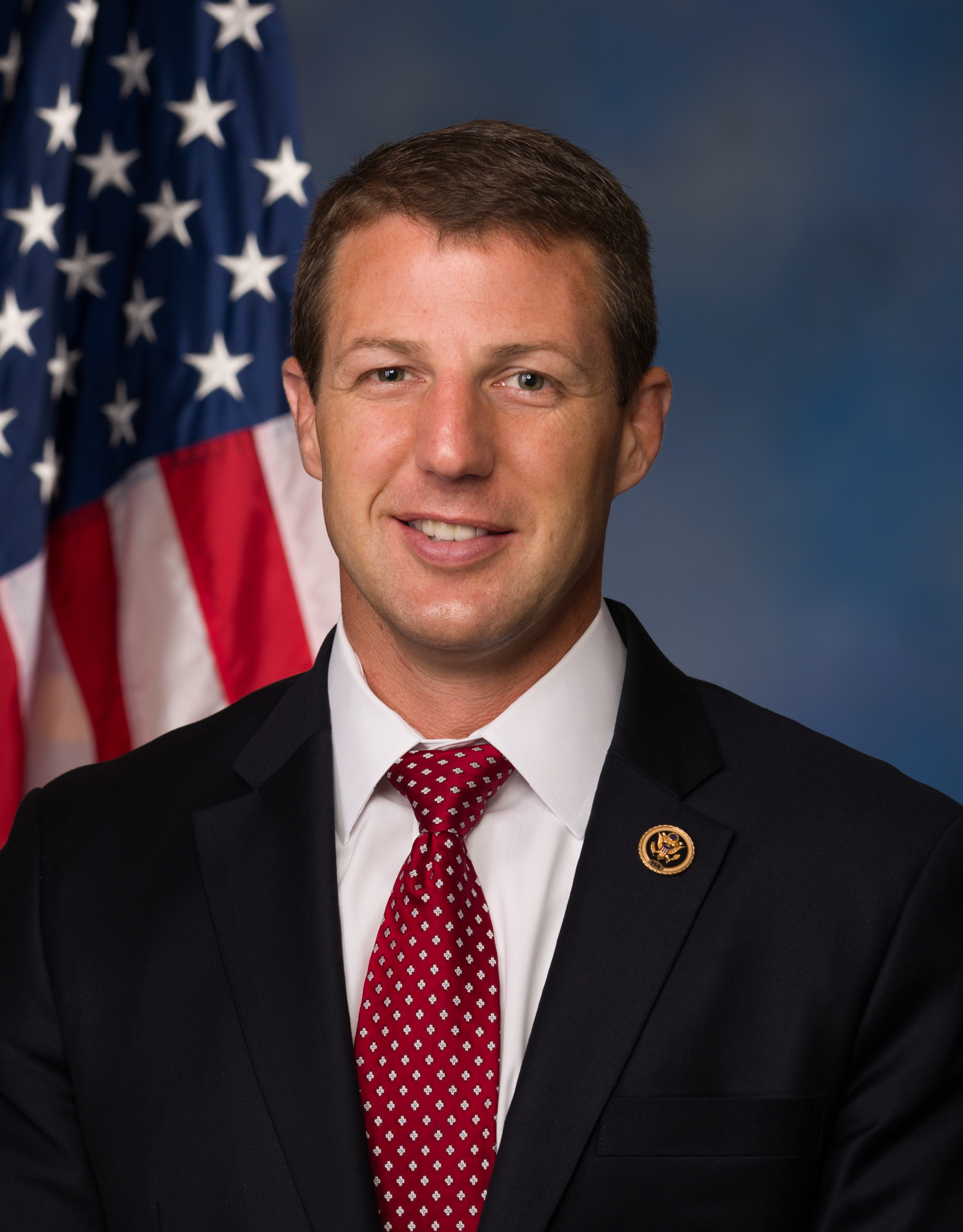
Official 114th Congress portrait, 2015

In June 2011, Oklahoma representative Dan Boren announced that he would not run for reelection in the United States House of Representatives election for Oklahoma's second congressional district. In July, Mullin established a campaign committee to run as a Republican and reported to the Federal Election Commission that he had loaned his campaign $100,000. Mullin's campaign advisor Trebor Worthen later told the Associated Press that Mullin was "fed up" with a provision of the Affordable Care Act that would have required he provide health insurance to his employees. Mullin traveled throughout east Oklahoma in August and September. His tour culminated on September 6, when he announced his campaign in Sallisaw. By October, Mullin had secured over $300,000 in cash donations, primarily funded by business owners and political action committees, widening his fundraising lead.

In March 2012, the Claremore Daily Progress reported that the Federal Election Commission had received a complaint about Mullin's campaign, alleging that it had accepted contributions exceeding the $2,500 limit for individuals; that it had received donations from corporations; and that Mullin Plumbing had improperly combined its commercials with campaign advertising. Mullin's attorneys requested a response from the commission on whether Mullin Plumbing's ads constituted electioneering in May. That month, the Federal Election Commission's lawyers drafted an opinion that would require Mullin's campaign to disclose his plumbing commercials to the commission, but said that customers who spent over $1,000 on plumbing services would not have to be identified.

The commission's decision to delay its opinion stalled Mullin's campaign and came amid a controversy involving Mullin Plumbing's hiring of Tim Saylor, who was convicted of gun-related crimes in 2009. Police questioned Mullin when Saylor was arrested, and Mullin said Saylor had not been subjected to a background check because he had worked for the company before. Mullin remained ahead of other candidates in finances; according to the Tulsa World, several officials considered him the front-runner in the Republican primary. Seeking to avoid complications weeks before the primary, Mullin said in June that he would no longer appear in ads for Mullin Plumbing.

Mullin received a plurality of votes in the Republican primary on June 26 but not a majority, necessitating a runoff election between him and state representative George Faught. Faught called Mullin a "failed candidate who cannot win". He took a personal approach in the runoff campaign, which intensified after he attacked Mullin for hiring Saylor. Mullin defeated Faught in the runoff on August 28. Rob Wallace, a former district attorney, defeated the businessman Wayne Herriman in his own runoff that day, becoming the Democratic nominee. Tulsa World said Mullin and Wallace disagreed "not so much on the issues as on what the issues actually are".

Mullin's campaign largely avoided debates and descriptions of public policy. He debated Wallace at Rogers State University in October. While Wallace criticized wealthy individuals and businesses and encouraged mass hiring to resolve the national debt, Mullin attacked overreaching government and proposed cutting spending to resolve the national debt. On November 6, Mullin defeated Wallace, securing the first all-Republican delegation for Oklahoma since the 1998 elections. After his victory, Mullin embarked on a tour of his district's 26 counties. In April 2013, the FEC ruled in Mullin's favor, determining that his campaign had refunded improper contributions but reminding it about corporate and excessive contributions.

=== Early tenure ===
Mullin was sworn into office on January 3, 2013. In his early tenure, his record was largely partisan, according to The Oklahoman. He voted against bipartisan bills to prepare federal agencies for public health emergencies and establish a network for researching pediatric diseases, arguing that the legislation would enlarge the federal government. Despite his partisan record, Mullin advocated for negotiating as opposed to compromising. He established an early-morning workout group that included Massachusetts representative Joe Kennedy III and Hawaii representative Tulsi Gabbard. Mullin was involved in discussions involving the Affordable Care Act that preceded a government shutdown in October.

On April 8, 2014, Mullin announced that he would seek reelection in that year's election. He was challenged by the professional angler Darrel Robertson, who portrayed Mullin as beholden to special interests; Mullin defeated Robertson in the Republican primary on June 24. He defeated the Democratic nominee, the retiree Earl Everett, in the general election on November 4, but Everett was killed in a car accident hours before the election. Oklahoma Democratic Party chair Wallace Collins said the party would seek a special election but it declined to sue to secure one.

In September 2015, House Speaker John Boehner announced that he would resign, setting off discussions over the party leadership in the House. House majority whip Steve Scalise was expected to run for House majority leader. According to Politico, Mullin had begun a campaign to succeed Scalise hours after Boehner's announcement. In the days after Boehner's announcement, several representatives—including Mullin—announced that they would enter the race for majority whip. Associates of North Carolina representative Patrick McHenry, who was aligned with California representative Kevin McCarthy, believed he had already won the position. In October, McCarthy announced that he would not seek to succeed Boehner in the speakership election after the Freedom Caucus refused to support him, forcing McCarthy to remain as majority leader and Scalise as majority whip. Mullin later served as a deputy whip.

In April 2016, Mullin filed to run in that year's election. He told the Tulsa World that he would not renege on his campaign vow to serve no more than three terms. He faced a challenge from Jarrin Jackson, a United States Army veteran critical of Mullin's vote on a spending bill the previous year. As the June primary approached, the race intensified, particularly after former Oklahoma senator Tom Coburn endorsed Jackson. Mullin defeated Jackson in the Republican primary on June 28, and defeated Democratic nominee Joshua Harris-Till and independent John McCarthy in the general election on November 8.

According to the Congressional Record, Mullin traveled to Jordan for three days in August 2016. The details of his visit remained largely vague. In his confirmation hearing to serve as secretary of homeland security in 2026, Mullin said he had gone on a classified visit, like an "official travel with specific deals or specific fact-finding". Mullin said he had gone through Survival, Evasion, Resistance and Escape training with a contingency to prepare for the visit. The New York Times associated the visit with Mullin's praise of Abdullah II for sending his personal helicopter to rescue him and other Americans, as well as the Syrian civil war. By December 2016, president-elect Donald Trump had named Mullin the chair of his Native American Coalition. That month, the coalition met with Trump's transition team to work to improve relations with Native American tribes.

In 2018, Mullin received an honorary doctorate from Bacone College, a private liberal arts college in Muskogee, Oklahoma.

=== Fourth campaign and continued tenure ===
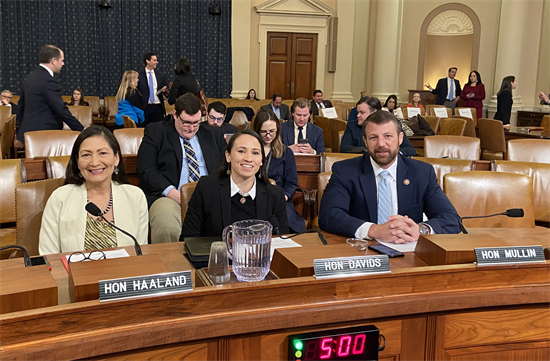
Mullin (right) appears before the House Committee on Ways and Means in March 2020

Mullin did not definitively say whether he would run for a fourth term in June 2016. In March 2017, he filed a declaration of candidacy with the FEC after being informed by it that he must "disavow" further fundraising or notify it that he would be a candidate in the 2018 election. After reports of the declaration emerged in April, Mullin's chief of staff, Mike Stopp, said that Mullin had only issued a "routine filing". On July 4, Mullin announced his candidacy for reelection to a fourth term. He acknowledged that he had broken his campaign pledge but argued that he could "make a difference" in the presidency of Donald Trump. The announcement garnered controversy but did not yield significant primary challenges; Brian Jackson, a professor at Northeastern State University, had announced his candidacy before Mullin's announcement. Mullin won the Republican primary on June 28, 2018, and the general election on November 8. He was reelected again in 2020, winning the Republican primary on July 2 and the general election on November 3.

As Trump expressed doubts about the ballot counting process in the 2020 presidential election, Mullin repeated similar sentiments. After Joe Biden was declared the winner of the election, Mullin wrote that he affirmed Trump's efforts to contest the results. Two days before the Electoral College vote count, Mullin said on a conference call that denying Biden victory was unlikely but that he would engage in efforts to overturn the election. Trump's false claims of voter fraud culminated in the January 6 Capitol attack. Mullin was widely photographed in the House chamber as rioters attempted to break in, urging them to stop. He witnessed the killing of Ashli Babbitt, a woman who entered a shattered window into the Speaker's Lobby. Mullin told the Tulsa World that the media, Republicans, and Democrats were equally responsible for the attack, refusing to blame Trump.

In August 2021, The Washington Post reported that Mullin had traveled to Greece and requested authorization from the United States Department of Defense to enter Kabul as the Taliban mounted an offensive on Afghanistan. The Department of Defense rejected Mullin's request. As U.S. forces completed their withdrawal from the country, Mullin asked John Pommersheim, the U.S. ambassador to Tajikistan, for assistance in moving cash into Tajikistan. He told Pommersheim he intended to rescue an Afghan woman and her four children by helicopter and planned to fly from Tbilisi to Dushanbe. Officials at the U.S. embassy in Dushanbe told Mullin that they could not assist him in subverting Tajikistan's laws on cash limits. Mullin was reportedly infuriated and threatened Pommersheim and embassy staff.

=== Committee assignments ===
In December 2012, the Republican Steering Committee appointed Mullin to serve on the House Committee on Transportation and Infrastructure, as well as on Natural Resources. In January 2013, he was named to the House Transportation Subcommittees on Water Resources and Environment, on Highways and Transit, on Economic Development, Public Buildings and Emergency Management, on Indian and Alaskan Native Affairs, and on Water and Power. In February 2014, he was named to the House Natural Resources Subcommittee on Energy and Mineral Resources. In November, Mullin was appointed to the House Committee on Energy and Commerce for the 114th Congress at the expense of his existing committee responsibilities. In December, he was assigned to the House Energy Subcommittees on Energy and Power, on Commerce, Manufacturing, and Trade, and on Oversight and Investigations. In January 2017, Mullin was named to the House Energy Subcommittee on Health.

== U.S. Senate (2023–2026) ==
=== Special election ===
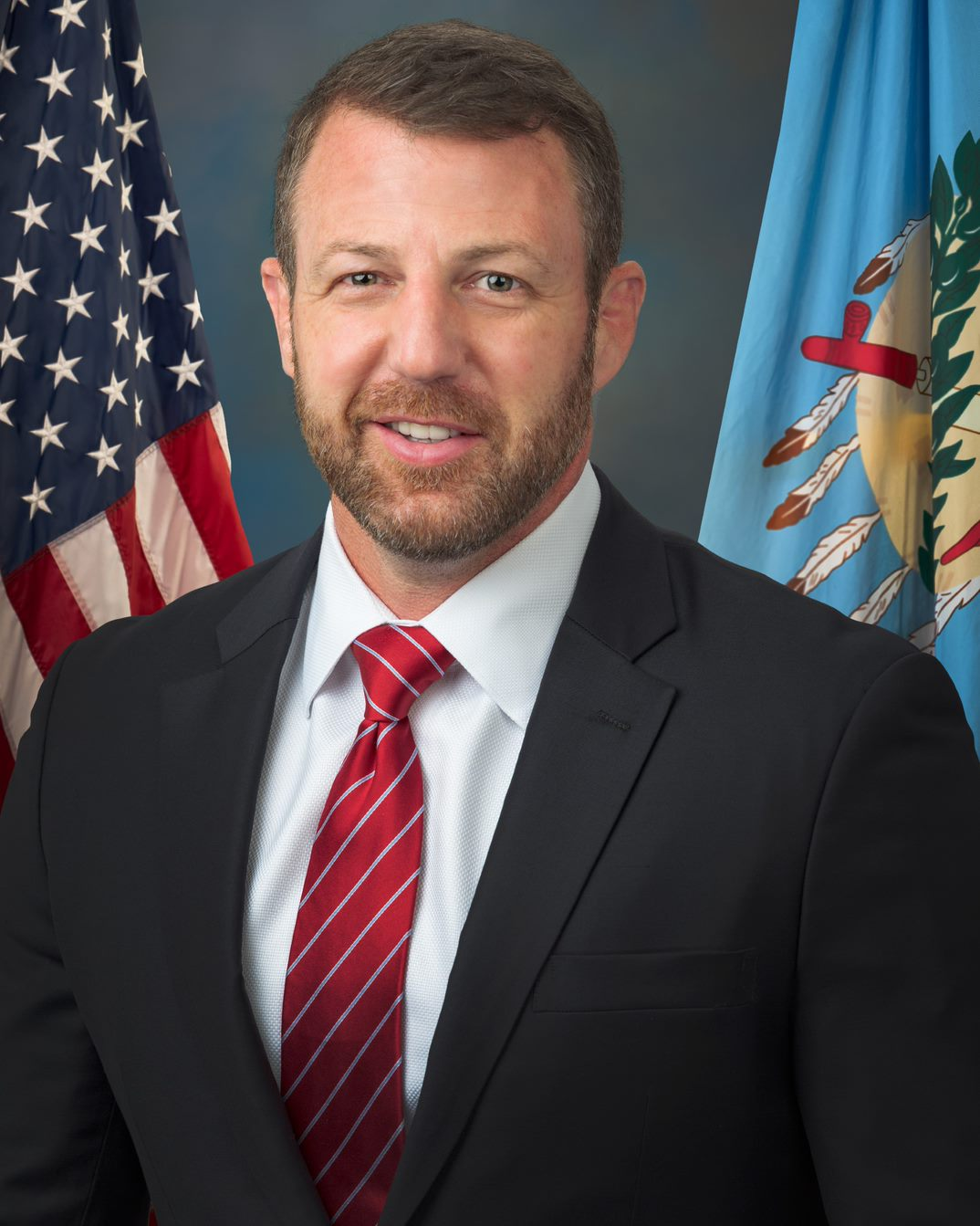
Official Senate portrait, 2022

On February 26, 2022, Oklahoma senator Jim Inhofe announced that he would resign from office at the end of the 117th United States Congress. Inhofe's statement began a special election to serve the remainder of his term. The next day, Mullin wrote on Twitter that he would run for Inhofe's seat. His campaign finance reports indicated that he had nearly $1 million in his account by December 2021. Within several weeks, the election had attracted several Republican candidates, including T. W. Shannon, the speaker of the Oklahoma House of Representatives, and Luke Holland, Inhofe's former chief of staff. Mullin committed US$1 million from his personal funds towards his campaign. He declined to participate in a primary debate, stating that he did not want to miss a House vote on firearms-related legislation.

Mullin garnered a plurality of the votes in the primary election on June 28 but not a majority, necessitating a runoff election between him and Shannon. After the primary, Mullin raised over $162,000 from local business executives—compared to Shannon's $2,000—and was endorsed by President Trump. Mullin and Shannon appeared in a televised debate in August. Mullin defeated Shannon in the runoff election on August 23. He won the November 8 general election against the Democratic nominee, former Oklahoma representative Kendra Horn; Libertarian nominee Robert Murphy; and the independent Ray Woods. In his victory speech, Mullin said he sought to be appointed to the Senate Committee on Armed Services.

=== Tenure ===
Mullin challenges Sean O'Brien to a fight during a Senate HELP Committee hearing in November 2023

Mullin was sworn into office on January 3, 2023. He became the first tribal citizen to serve in the United States Senate since Colorado senator Ben Nighthorse Campbell resigned in 2005, the second member of the Cherokee Nation to serve in the Senate after Robert L. Owen, who retired in 1925, and the only senator in the 118th Congress without a bachelor's degree.

In March 2023, Mullin publicly sparred with Teamsters president Sean O'Brien in a hearing before the Senate Committee on Health, Education, Labor and Pensions, telling him to shut his mouth. In a second hearing in November, Mullin threatened to fight O'Brien. The dispute nearly came to a brawl before the committee's chairman, Bernie Sanders, urged Mullin to relent.

In March 2026, The New York Times reported that Mullin had been working with New Jersey representative Josh Gottheimer on a proposal to end a shutdown affecting the Department of Homeland Security. The proposal would require judicial warrants for forced home entry; preempt immigration enforcement at locations such as churches and schools; and implement standards imposed in the Biden administration.

=== Committee assignments ===
In February 2023, Mullin was named to the Senate Committees on Armed Services, on Environment and Public Works, and on Indian Affairs, and assigned to the Armed Services Subcommittees on Airland, on Emerging Threats and Capabilities, and on Readiness and Management Support.

=== Resignation ===
After Trump nominated Mullin for secretary of homeland security, several Oklahoma politicians, including representative Kevin Hern, expressed interest in running in the election to succeed Mullin. Trump endorsed Hern. Mullin resigned on March 23. On March 24, Governor Kevin Stitt named businessman Alan Armstrong as his interim successor.

== Secretary of Homeland Security (2026–present) ==
=== Nomination and confirmation ===
Mullin testifies at his confirmation hearing before the Senate Committee on Homeland Security and Governmental Affairs in March 2026

On March 5, 2026, President Donald Trump fired Secretary of Homeland Security Kristi Noem and nominated Mullin to succeed her. Mullin's nomination occurred amid a shutdown affecting the Department of Homeland Security. According to Politico, his nomination was expected to be a "straightforward process" because he had served in the Senate, though Senate minority leader Chuck Schumer said the Senate should not consider his nomination until the Department of Homeland Security and Immigration and Customs Enforcement were "reined in". Politico later reported that White House border czar Tom Homan was working to develop a relationship with Mullin. According to The Atlantic, many in the department's leadership were "pleased" by Mullin's appointment.

Mullin appeared before the Senate Committee on Homeland Security and Governmental Affairs on March 18. In his testimony, he said he would continue the strict immigration policy of the second Trump administration but would move to end the practice of allowing immigration officers to enter homes without a search warrant, and that DHS would seek agreements with local jails, shifting away from mass immigration raids such as Operation Metro Surge. Mullin also said he would cease Noem's policy to review large Federal Emergency Management Agency contracts, a practice that severely delayed disaster assistance. The committee's chairman, Kentucky senator Rand Paul, verbally attacked Mullin for saying he understood why Paul's neighbor had assaulted him in 2017, suggesting that Mullin had "anger issues". Michigan senator Gary Peters, the ranking member of the Senate Committee on Homeland Security and Governmental Affairs, questioned Mullin over comments he made insinuating that he had been in a war zone.

The Senate Committee on Homeland Security and Governmental Affairs voted to advance Mullin's nomination to the Senate in an 8–7 vote on March 19. The vote was largely along party lines, though Paul voted against Mullin, while Pennsylvania senator John Fetterman, a Democrat, voted in favor. Fetterman's deciding vote led to public criticism from some Democrats. The Senate advanced Mullin's nomination in a 54–37 procedural vote on March 22. He was confirmed in a 54–45 vote the next day. The vote largely followed party lines, with the exception of Democratic senators Martin Heinrich of New Mexico and Fetterman, who voted to confirm Mullin, and Paul, who voted against the nomination.

=== Tenure ===
Attorney general Pam Bondi swearing in Mullin as secretary of homeland security in March 2026

Mullin was sworn in as secretary of homeland security by Attorney General Pam Bondi on March 24, 2026. He became the first member of the Cherokee Nation to serve in the Cabinet of the United States. Mullin began his tenure amid several tensions within the Department of Homeland Security, including reputational damage following the killings of Renee Good and Alex Pretti, criticism over Noem's use of government funding, and the continuation of the partial government shutdown. Mullin set out to continue Trump's mass deportation strategy while avoiding controversy. He sought to negotiate an agreement to end the shutdown. In April, Mullin reversed Noem's policy to personally review contracts and grants worth over $100,000. Mullin refused to commit to follow orders from the judicial branch.

== Wealth ==
In June 2013, financial disclosures indicated that Mullin might have been the wealthiest member of Oklahoma's congressional delegation, with an estimated net worth between $2.8 and $9 million. In 2024, his assets were estimated between $29 and $97 million. The sale of Mullin's businesses in 2021 was not publicly disclosed; according to the private market service PitchBook, Mullin moved between $25 million and $50 million into a cash management account the day he sold his companies. In April 2017, Mullin said at a town hall in Jay, Oklahoma, that it was "bullcrap" that taxpayers pay his salary. According to Forbes, Mullin partially or fully owned 30 businesses by March 2026.

Mullin has traded stocks as a representative and a senator, raising questions of conflicts of interest. Around January 2017, he bought stock in Innate Immunotherapeutics, a company involved in an insider trading scandal with New York representative Chris Collins. The apparent success of Mullin's trades as a senator—particularly the purchase of Raytheon shares weeks before the October 7 attacks—inspired a tracker based on his portfolio. In June 2024, a spokesperson for Mullin told The New Yorker that his portfolio was managed by an "independent third party". In December 2025, Mullin invested in over 30 companies in a transaction worth as much as $2.8 million. The purchases included shares in Chevron, whose stock price abruptly rose after the U.S. intervened to capture Venezuelan president Nicolás Maduro five days later.

In December 2013, the Office of Congressional Ethics recommended a full investigation to the House Committee on Ethics over allegations that Mullin received outside earned income and had endorsed products and services owned by him or his family. In March 2014, the committee released a report alleging that Mullin violated House ethics rules and federal laws by earning over $600,000 from his plumbing companies—in excess of a limit imposed on lawmakers—and by sitting on his plumbing company's board. The Ethics Committee continued to investigate the earnings but declined to establish a special investigative panel. In 2018, the committee called for Mullin to return $40,000 to his family business, Mullin West. In 2024, the Campaign Legal Center filed a complaint with the Senate Select Committee on Ethics alleging that Mullin had not disclosed nine stock purchases in 2023. Mullin reported the purchases nearly a year later.

== Political positions ==
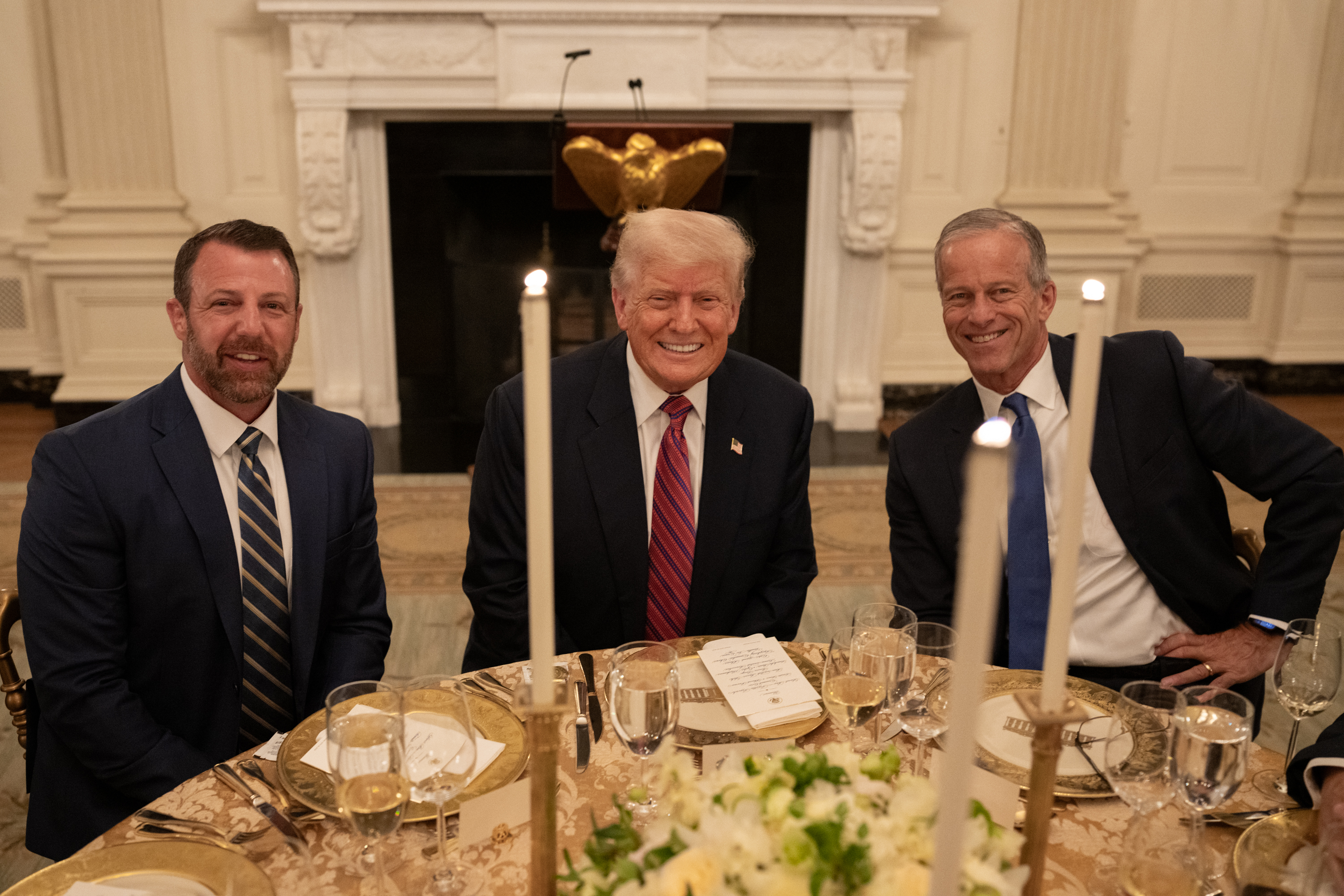
Mullin (left) with president Donald Trump (center) and Senate majority leader John Thune (right) in July 2025

In his 2011 campaign announcement, Mullin said he would oppose the Obama administration's policies. In November 2015, he endorsed Florida senator Marco Rubio in the 2016 presidential election. After Rubio lost to Donald Trump in the Republican primaries, Mullin endorsed Trump in August 2016, telling the Tulsa Regional Chamber of Commerce that Trump was "friendly" to businesses and that he could not trust Hillary Clinton. By June 2018, The Oklahoman had called Mullin one of Trump's "most vocal backers", particularly on tariffs. In October 2018, Trump endorsed Mullin in that year's election.

Mullin's relationship with Trump became closer after Mullin's son Jim suffered a severe brain injury in a high school wrestling match. Trump invited Mullin and his son to a rally and offered to pay for Jim's treatments. According to Mullin, Trump regularly called to ask about Jim. In March 2022, Mullin proposed expunging Trump's first impeachment, arguing that it did not meet the standard of high crimes and misdemeanors. In April, he wrote in a fundraising letter that the Biden administration "tried to kill" him in his effort to rescue Afghans in 2021. In July, Trump endorsed Mullin in that year's special election.

=== Social and economic issues ===
After the Sandy Hook Elementary School shooting, Mullin opposed Vice President Joe Biden's suggestion that President Barack Obama could use an executive order to enact gun control, calling it "absurd". Mullin defended the hunter Phil Robertson after he told GQ that homosexuality was "just not logical" and a sin, saying Robertson was being "punished" for expressing his opinion. Mullin supported the Supreme Court decision Burwell v. Hobby Lobby Stores, Inc. (2014), which gave private corporations religious exemptions from certain regulations. In a televised debate in August 2022, Mullin said he supported a federal ban on abortion without exceptions.

In May 2016, Mullin criticized the Department of Education and the Department of Justice's Dear Colleague letter on transgender students, arguing that transgender girls should not use girls' restrooms in public schools. By January 2021, Mullin and Hawaii representative Tulsi Gabbard had introduced a bill to prevent transgender women from participating in women's sports.

Mullin opposed Obama's proposal to increase the federal minimum wage from $7.25 to $10.10. He objected to Biden's student loan forgiveness plan. In May 2016, Mullin introduced the Muhammad Ali Expansion Act, a bill that would expand the Muhammad Ali Boxing Reform Act to include mixed martial arts. The measure, which would force promotion companies to share financial information with fighters and establish an independent ranking system, was opposed by the Ultimate Fighting Championship.

=== Foreign policy ===
Mullin opposed United States intervention in Syria and voted against authorizing force in September 2013. He called the Arms Trade Treaty "out of touch with the American people" and opposed the Joint Plan of Action, expressing mistrust in the government of Iran's intentions. Mullin praised the opening of the U.S. embassy in Jerusalem in 2018. He condemned the Russian invasion of Ukraine, accusing Russian president Vladimir Putin of seeking to impose communism globally. Mullin voted for a $95.3 billion aid package to Ukraine, Israel, and Taiwan, arguing that three-quarters of its spending remained in the U.S. He praised U.S. strikes on Iranian nuclear sites in June 2025 as ending a "forever war" and strikes on alleged drug traffickers as "proactive", dismissing concerns that a followup strike in one operation might have been a war crime.

Mullin criticized the 2020–2021 U.S. troop withdrawal from Afghanistan. In 2024, he blocked the promotion of Chris Donahue, a United States Army general who commanded the operation and was the last international soldier to leave the country. Mullin did not publicly give his reason for blocking the nomination, and lifted his hold a week later. After the shooting of two West Virginia National Guardsmen in November 2025, Mullin said that Afghan refugees had been "dumped" into the U.S. on Special Immigrant Visas without sufficient federal programs to assist them.

=== Immigration policy ===
Mullin is considered an immigration hardliner, according to The New York Times. The Associated Press described Mullin as one of Trump's closest allies in the Senate on immigration, having served as an intermediary between the White House and congressional Republicans during negotiations over border security legislation. In 2014, he criticized the housing of unaccompanied migrant children at Fort Sill and condemned the Obama administration's actions at the onset of an immigration crisis. Mullin supported Trump's proposed additions to the Mexico–United States border wall and called for them to be completed. In July 2022, he sent secretary of homeland security Alejandro Mayorkas and acting director of U.S. Immigration and Customs Enforcement Tae Johnson a letter criticizing the Biden administration's "policies of amnesty, catch and release, and low security". After the fatal shootings of Renee Good and Alex Pretti by federal agents in Minneapolis, Mullin called Pretti a "deranged individual" in a Fox News interview; at his confirmation hearing to serve as secretary of homeland security, Mullin said he regretted that remark.

=== Environmental and interior affairs ===
In 2013, Mullin introduced legislation to streamline the National Environmental Policy Act for wind energy. He commended ExxonMobil after the Mayflower oil spill. Mullin voted for the Protecting States' Rights to Promote American Energy Security Act, which would have deferred authority on fracking to states. In 2015, Mullin introduced an amendment to the Fixing America's Surface Transportation Act that would allow the killing of swallows, a protected species in the Migratory Bird Treaty Act, to hasten construction. After Russia invaded Ukraine, Mullin requested that Biden increase U.S. production of oil and gas to avert exacerbating an energy crisis. In 2023, Mullin criticized the EPA for promoting electric vehicles.

In March 2013, Mullin cosponsored legislation that would shift control of federally regulated shorelines from the Federal Energy Regulatory Commission to states. That month, he urged Obama to approve the Keystone XL pipeline. Mullin opposed the farm bill in 2013, arguing that it failed to address the needs of farmers. He supported the Supreme Court decision Tarrant Regional Water District v. Herrmann (2013), which affirmed that Oklahoma statutes could override the Red River Compact Commission.

=== Tribal affairs ===
In December 2018, amid a government shutdown, Mullin introduced a bill to ensure that the Indian Health Service would remain funded during shutdowns. After the Supreme Court ruled in McGirt v. Oklahoma (2020) that the domain of the Muscogee Nation was Indian country, Mullin urged tribes to negotiate an agreement with Oklahoma over prosecutions.

In 2013, Mullin voted against reauthorizing the Violence Against Women Act. He cosponsored the Lumbee Fairness Act, which gave federal recognition to the Lumbee Tribe of North Carolina. He also supported measures to limit the sovereignty of the United Keetoowah Band of Cherokee Indians.

=== Fiscal measures and government structures ===
In his 2011 campaign announcement, Mullin called for firing "career bureaucrats" in Washington, D.C. He opposed measures that would increase the national debt of the United States. Mullin voted against the Hurricane Sandy relief bill for adding to the national debt. As the federal government neared a shutdown, he demanded that the Affordable Care Act be delayed or defunded, even at the risk of the shutdown. In 2025, he praised the U.S. federal deferred resignation program.

Mullin opposes Environmental Protection Agency (EPA) and Occupational Safety and Health Administration regulations. In 2015, he sought to reverse Obama administration regulations on oil and gas. Mullin objected to the EPA's Clean Water Rule and praised the Supreme Court's ruling in West Virginia v. EPA (2022) limiting the Clean Air Act.

== Personal life ==
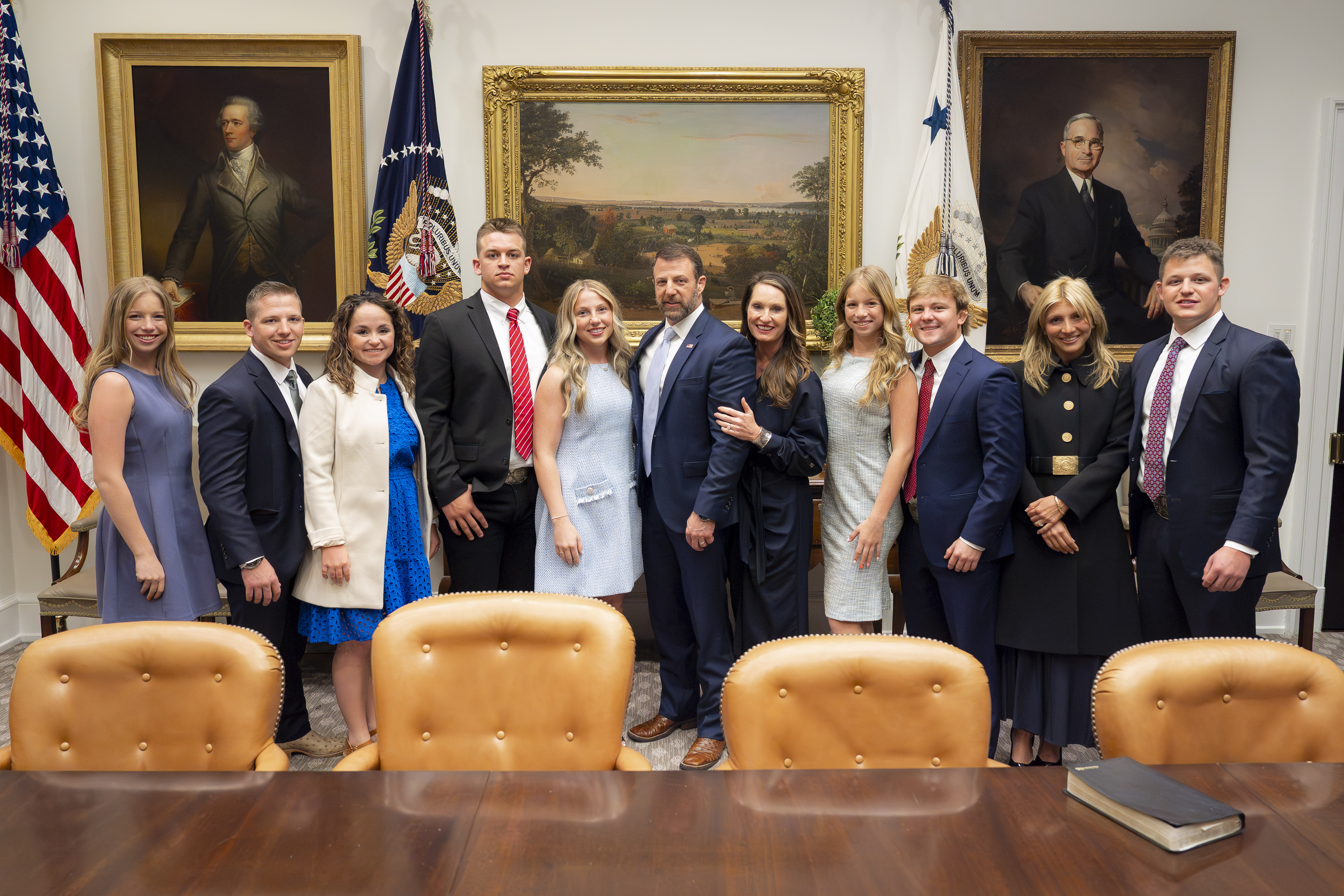
Mullin with his wife and children in 2026.

Mullin met his future wife, Christie Renee Rowan, while they were in grade school; they dated throughout high school and married in 1997. They have six children, three of whom they adopted.

== Electoral history ==
=== 2012 ===
2012 United States House of Representatives Republican Party primary for Oklahoma's second congressional district
Party	Candidate	Votes	%
Republican	Markwayne Mullin	12,004	42.4
Republican	George Faught	6,598	23.3
Republican	Dakota Wood	3,474	12.3
Republican	Dustin Rowe	2,866	10.1
Republican	Wayne Pettigrew	2,477	8.7
Republican	Dwayne Thompson	901	3.2
Total votes		28,320	100.0

2012 United States House of Representatives election for Oklahoma's second congressional district
Party	Candidate	Votes	%
Republican	Markwayne Mullin	143,253	57.3
Democratic	Rob Wallace	95,763	38.3
Independent	Others	10,794	4.3
Total votes		249,810	100.0

=== 2014 ===
2014 United States House of Representatives Republican Party primary for Oklahoma's second congressional district
Party	Candidate	Votes	%
Republican	Markwayne Mullin	26,224	79.7
Republican	Darrel Robertson	6,667	20.3
Total votes		32,891	100.0

2014 United States House of Representatives election for Oklahoma's second congressional district
Party	Candidate	Votes	%
Republican	Markwayne Mullin	110,819	70.0
Democratic	Earl Everett	38,924	24.6
Independent	Jon Douthitt	8,502	5.4
Total votes		158,245	100.0

=== 2016 ===
2016 United States House of Representatives Republican Party primary for Oklahoma's second congressional district
Party	Candidate	Votes	%
Republican	Markwayne Mullin	20,052	63.4
Republican	Jarrin Jackson	11,575	36.6
Total votes		31,627	100.0

2016 United States House of Representatives election for Oklahoma's second congressional district
Party	Candidate	Votes	%
Republican	Markwayne Mullin	189,839	70.6
Democratic	Joshua Harris-Till	62,387	23.2
Independent	John McCarthy	16,644	6.2
Total votes		268,870	100.0

=== 2018 ===
2018 United States House of Representatives Republican Party primary for Oklahoma's second congressional district
Party	Candidate	Votes	%
Republican	Markwayne Mullin	32,624	54.1
Republican	Jarrin Jackson	15,191	25.2
Republican	Brian Jackson	6,899	11.5
Republican	John McCarthy	5,536	9.2
Total votes		60,250	100.0

2018 United States House of Representatives election for Oklahoma's second congressional district
Party	Candidate	Votes	%
Republican	Markwayne Mullin	140,451	65.0
Democratic	Jason Nichols	65,021	30.1
Independent	John Foreman	6,390	3.0
Libertarian	Richard Castaldo	4,140	1.9
Total votes		216,002	100.0

=== 2020 ===
2020 United States House of Representatives Republican Party primary for Oklahoma's second congressional district
Party	Candidate	Votes	%
Republican	Markwayne Mullin	53,116	79.9
Republican	Joseph Silk	8,440	12.7
Republican	Rhonda Hopkins	4,910	7.4
Republican	Brian Jackson	5,536	9.2
Total votes		66,466	100.0

2020 United States House of Representatives election for Oklahoma's second congressional district
Party	Candidate	Votes	%
Republican	Markwayne Mullin	216,511	75.0
Democratic	Danyell Lanier	63,472	22.0
Libertarian	Richard Castaldo	8,544	3.0
Total votes		288,527	100.0

=== 2022 ===
2022 United States Senate Republican Party primary in Oklahoma
Party	Candidate	Votes	%
Republican	Markwayne Mullin	155,997	43.6
Republican	T.W. Shannon	62,712	17.5
Republican	Nathan Dahm	42,638	11.9
Republican	Luke Holland	40,322	11.3
Republican	Scott Pruitt	18,040	5.0
Republican	Randy Grellner	15,779	4.4
Republican	Laura Moreno	6,593	1.8
Republican	Jessica Jean Garrison	6,104	1.7
Republican	Alex Gray	3,060	0.9
Republican	John Tompkins	2,331	0.7
Republican	Adam Holley	1,871	0.5
Republican	Michael Coibion	1,259	0.4
Republican	Paul Royse	900	0.3
Total votes		357,606	100.0

2022 United States Senate special runoff election in Oklahoma
Party	Candidate	Votes	%
Republican	Markwayne Mullin	183,034	65.1
Republican	T.W. Shannon	98,215	34.9
Total votes		281,249	100.0

2022 United States Senate special election in Oklahoma
Party	Candidate	Votes	%
Republican	Markwayne Mullin	710,643	61.8
Democratic	Kendra Horn	405,389	35.2
Libertarian	Robert Murphy	17,386	1.5
Independent	Ray Woods	17,063	1.5
Total votes		1,150,481	100.0

== Mixed martial arts record ==
Professional record breakdown
3 matches	3 wins	0 losses
By knockout	1	0
By submission	2	0

Res.	Record	Opponent	Method	Event	Date	Round	Time	Location	Notes
Win	3–0	Clinton Bonds	TKO (punches)	XFL - Xtreme Fighting League	April 7, 2007	2	1:27	Tulsa, Oklahoma, United States	
Win	2–0	Clinton Bonds	Submission (Armbar)	XFL - SuperBrawl	February 3, 2007	2	1:13	Oklahoma City, Oklahoma, United States	
Win	1–0	Bobby Kelley	Submission (Rear-Naked Choke)	XFL - Xtreme Fighting League	November 11, 2006	1	0:46	Miami, Oklahoma, United States	

U.S. House of Representatives
Preceded by Dan Boren	Member of the U.S. House of Representatives from Oklahoma's 2nd congressional district 2013–2023	Succeeded by Josh Brecheen
Party political offices
Preceded by Jim Inhofe	Republican nominee for U.S. Senator from Oklahoma (Class 2); 2022	Succeeded by Kevin Hern
U.S. Senate
Preceded by Jim Inhofe	U.S. Senator (Class 2) from Oklahoma; 2023–2026; Served alongside: James Lankford	Succeeded by Alan Armstrong
Political offices
Preceded by Kristi Noem	United States Secretary of Homeland Security; 2026–present	Incumbent
Order of precedence
Preceded by Doug Collins as United States Secretary of Veterans Affairs	Order of precedence of the United States as Secretary of Homeland Security	Succeeded by Stephen Miller as White House Chief of Staff
U.S. presidential line of succession
Preceded by Doug Collins as United States Secretary of Veterans Affairs	Eighteenth in line as Secretary of Homeland Security	Last
