= Tennie Rogers =

American politician

Tennie Rogers (August 1, 1927 – January 22, 2009) was a perennial candidate for national office, having run in Republican primaries for United States President three times, and one time for United States Congress. In 1992 she was on more state ballots than any previous female Republican candidate for president. She is the mother of Evelyn Rogers, another perennial candidate.

== Early life ==
Tennie Rogers was born on August 1, 1927, in Russell, Arkansas, where she graduated high school. She attended Harding University, Pasadena City College, and California State University, Los Angeles. She received a bachelor's degree in bioscience and business education and a master's degree in secondary education. She was also a registered nurse. On November 21, 1951, she married Ivan Kenneth Rogers.

== Campaigns ==
=== 1992 presidential campaign ===
In 1992 she was on nine State Republican primary ballots, winning 7,677 votes. She was the first female Republican candidate to have been on so many ballots, exceeding former Senator Margaret Chase Smith.

=== 1996 presidential campaign ===
In 1996, she was on the Republican primary ballot in New Hampshire and Mississippi, earning just 12 votes in the former and 35 in the latter.

Following this election, she wrote a book, Standing Up: Rogers For U.S. President, that would serve as both autobiography and campaign tool for her anticipated third attempt at the presidency.

=== 2000 presidential and congressional campaigns ===
In 2000 she once again ran, but this time failed to get on any ballots for president. In 2000 she ran for the Republican nomination for Oklahoma's 2nd Congressional District in the U.S. House of Representatives, winning 266 votes, coming in 6th of seven candidates, losing to Andy Ewing.

=== 2002 congressional campaign ===
In 2002 she ran for the Republican nomination for Oklahoma's 4th Congressional District winning 648 votes, coming in 4th of six candidates, losing to Tom Cole who won with 21,789 votes and then went on to win the general election.

== Evelyn Rogers ==
Her daughter, Evelyn Rogers, is also a perennial candidate. She is a librarian at Tulsa Community College who ran for the 3rd Congressional District in 1996, and the 1st Congressional District in 2000, 2001, 2002, and 2004.
