= 1912 Oklahoma elections =

- November, 1912

The 1912 Oklahoma elections were held on November 5, 1912, in the U.S. state of Oklahoma. Oklahoma voters participated in the 1912 United States presidential election and the 1912 United States House of Representatives elections. Elections also took place for the Oklahoma Corporation Commission and Oklahoma Supreme Court.

== Federal ==
=== President ===
1912 United States presidential election in Oklahoma
| Party | Candidate | Votes | % |
|---|---|---|---|
| Democratic | Woodrow Wilson | 119,156 | 46.95% |
| Republican | William Howard Taft (incumbent) | 90,786 | 35.77% |
| Socialist | Eugene V. Debs | 41,674 | 16.42% |
| Prohibition | Eugene W. Chafin | 2,185 | 0.86% |
| Total votes | | 253,801 | 100% |

=== Senate ===
1912 United States Senate election in Oklahoma
| Party | Candidate | Votes | % |
|---|---|---|---|
| Democratic | Robert L. Owen (Incumbent) | 126,418 | 50.43% |
| Republican | Joseph Dickerson | 83,429 | 33.28% |
| Socialist | John Wills | 40,860 | 16.3% |
| Turnout | | | 15.13% |

=== House ===
| District | Incumbent | | | This race | |
| District | Member | Party | First elected | Results | Candidates |
|---|---|---|---|---|---|
| Oklahoma 1 | Bird S. McGuire | Republican | 1907 | Incumbent re-elected. | ▌ ✓ Bird S. McGuire (Republican) 45.0%; ▌John J. Davis (Democratic) 43.6%; ▌Achilles W. Renshaw (Socialist) 10.5%; ▌Thomas P. Hopley (Prohibition) 0.7% |
| Oklahoma 2 | Dick T. Morgan | Republican | 1908 | Incumbent re-elected. | ▌ ✓ Dick T. Morgan (Republican) 43.8%; ▌J. J. Carney (Democratic) 42.7%; ▌P. D. McKenzie (Socialist) 13.4% |
| Oklahoma 3 | James S. Davenport | Democratic | 1910 | Incumbent re-elected. | ▌ ✓ James S. Davenport (Democratic) 49.5%; ▌R. T. Daniel (Republican) 38.0%; ▌Lewis B. Irvin (Socialist) 11.7%; ▌H. L. Storm (Independent) 0.6% |
| Oklahoma 4 | Charles D. Carter | Democratic | 1907 | Incumbent re-elected. | ▌ ✓ Charles D. Carter (Democratic) 51.3%; ▌E. N. Wright (Republican) 24.4%; ▌Fred W. Holt (Socialist) 24.2% |
| Oklahoma 5 | Scott Ferris | Democratic | 1907 | Incumbent re-elected. | ▌ ✓ Scott Ferris (Democratic) 56.2%; ▌C. O. Clark (Republican) 22.7%; ▌H. H. Stallard (Socialist) 20.9% |
| Oklahoma at-large 3 seats on a general ticket | None (New seat) | | | New seat. Democratic gain. | ▌ ✓ William H. Murray (Democratic); ▌ ✓ Claude Weaver (Democratic); ▌ ✓ Joseph B. Thompson (Democratic); ▌Alvin D. Allen (Republican); ▌James L. Brown (Republican); ▌Emory Brownlee (Republican); ▌Oscar Ameringer (Socialist); ▌J. T. Cumbie (Socialist); ▌J. Luther Langston (Socialist) |
| Oklahoma at-large 3 seats on a general ticket | None (New seat) | | | New seat. Democratic gain. | ▌ ✓ William H. Murray (Democratic); ▌ ✓ Claude Weaver (Democratic); ▌ ✓ Joseph B. Thompson (Democratic); ▌Alvin D. Allen (Republican); ▌James L. Brown (Republican); ▌Emory Brownlee (Republican); ▌Oscar Ameringer (Socialist); ▌J. T. Cumbie (Socialist); ▌J. Luther Langston (Socialist) |
| Oklahoma at-large 3 seats on a general ticket | None (New seat) | | | New seat. Democratic gain. | ▌ ✓ William H. Murray (Democratic); ▌ ✓ Claude Weaver (Democratic); ▌ ✓ Joseph B. Thompson (Democratic); ▌Alvin D. Allen (Republican); ▌James L. Brown (Republican); ▌Emory Brownlee (Republican); ▌Oscar Ameringer (Socialist); ▌J. T. Cumbie (Socialist); ▌J. Luther Langston (Socialist) |

== State ==
=== Corporation Commission ===
1912 Oklahoma Corporation Commission election
| Party | Candidate | Votes | % | ±% |
|---|---|---|---|---|
| Democratic | J.E. Love (incumbent) | 120,446 | 48.6% | −6.3% |
| Republican | P.J. Loewen | 85,698 | 34.6% | −6.5% |
| Socialist | C.E. Hedgepeth | 41,283 | 16.6% | +12.7% |
| Democratic hold | | Swing | N/A | |

=== Supreme Court ===
1912 Oklahoma Supreme Court District 1 election
| Party | Candidate | Votes | % | ±% |
|---|---|---|---|---|
| Democratic | John B. Turner (incumbent) | 120,342 | 58.0% | +0.8% |
| Republican | Charles A. Cooke | 87,431 | 42.0% | −0.8% |
| Democratic hold | | Swing | N/A | |

=== Court of Criminal Appeals ===
1912 Oklahoma Court of Criminal Appeals Southern District election
| Party | Candidate | Votes | % | ±% |
|---|---|---|---|---|
| Democratic | Henry Marshall Furman (incumbent) | 120,257 | 48.4% | −7.6% |
| Republican | George M. Ralls | 86,834 | 34.9% | −9.0% |
| Socialist | E.S. Hurt | 41,274 | 16.6% | New |
| Democratic hold | | Swing | N/A | |

=== State questions ===
==== State question 38 ====
Initiative petition No. 23

The gist of the proposition is as follows: That Section 9, Article 9 of the Constitution be amended so that any foreign or domestic railroad, transportation or transmission company or corporation may lease, sell or otherwise dispose of its property or franchise to, or may lease, buy or otherwise acquire the property or franchise of any like company or corporation. This amendment is not operative until the consent of the Corporation Commission to the proposed transfer is first given in writing and the Legislature may impose other restrictions on the right to consolidate.

State question
| Choice | Votes | % |
|---|---|---|
| For | 164,530 | 72.13 |
| Against | 63,586 | 27.87 |
| Total | 228,116 | 100.00 |

==== State question 40 ====
Initiative petition No. 25

The gist of the proposition is as follows: That the State Capitol be located at Guthrie.

State question
| Choice | Votes | % |
|---|---|---|
| For | 86,549 | 45.63 |
| Against | 103,106 | 54.37 |
| Total | 189,655 | 100.00 |

==== State question 45 ====
Legislative Referendum No. 17 Submitted by House Joint Resolution No. 2, page 416, Session Laws 1911.

The gist of the proposition is as follows: That Section 12, Article 10 of the Constitution be amended so that the Legislature shall have the power to levy such taxes as will maintain all public schools for at least five months in the year.

State question
| Choice | Votes | % |
|---|---|---|
| For | 100,042 | 60.46 |
| Against | 65,436 | 39.54 |
| Required majority | | 123714 |
| Total | 165,478 | 100.00 |
