= List of United States representatives from Oklahoma =

The following is an alphabetical list of United States representatives from the state of Oklahoma. For chronological tables of members of both houses of the United States Congress from the state (through the present day), see Oklahoma's congressional delegations. The list of names should be complete (as of January 3, 2019), but other data may be incomplete. It includes members who have represented both the state and the territory, both past and present.

== Current members ==
Updated January 3, 2025. (citation is outdated)

- 1st district: Kevin Hern (R) (since 2018)
- 2nd district: Josh Brecheen (R) (since 2023)
- 3rd district: Frank Lucas (R) (since 1994)
- 4th district: Tom Cole (R) (since 2003)
- 5th district: Stephanie Bice (R) (since 2021)

== List of members and delegates ==
Member / Delegate	Party	District	Years	Electoral history
Carl Albert	Democratic	3rd	January 3, 1947 – January 3, 1977	Elected in 1946. Retired.
Page Belcher	Republican	8th	January 3, 1951 – January 3, 1953	Elected in 1950. Redistricted to the 1st district.
Page Belcher	Republican	1st	January 3, 1953 – January 3, 1973	Redistricted from the 8th district and re-elected in 1952. Retired.
Stephanie Bice	Republican	5th	January 3, 2021 – present	Elected in 2020. Incumbent.
Dan Boren	Democratic	2nd	January 3, 2005 – January 3, 2013	Elected in 2004. Retired.
Lyle Boren	Democratic	4th	January 3, 1937 – January 3, 1947	Elected in 1936. Lost renomination to G. Johnson.
Josh Brecheen	Republican	2nd	January 3, 2023 – present	Elected in 2022. Incumbent.
William K. Brewster	Democratic	3rd	January 3, 1991 – January 3, 1997	Elected in 1990. Retired.
Jim Bridenstine	Republican	1st	January 3, 2013 – April 23, 2018	Elected in 2012. Resigned to become NASA Administrator.
James Yancy Callahan	Free Silver	Territory	March 4, 1897 – March 3, 1899	Elected in 1896. Retired.
John Newbold Camp	Republican	6th	January 3, 1969 – January 3, 1975	Elected in 1968. Lost re-election to English.
Brad Carson	Democratic	2nd	January 3, 2001 – January 3, 2005	Elected in 2000. Retired to run for U.S. Senator.
Charles D. Carter	Democratic	4th	November 16, 1907 – March 3, 1915	Elected in 1907. Redistricted to the 3rd district.
Charles D. Carter	Democratic	3rd	March 4, 1915 – March 3, 1927	Redistricted from the 4th district and re-elected in 1914. Lost renomination to Cartwright.
Wilburn Cartwright	Democratic	3rd	March 4, 1927 – January 3, 1943	Elected in 1926. Lost renomination to Stewart.
Thomas Alberter Chandler	Republican	1st	March 4, 1917 – March 3, 1919	Elected in 1916. Lost re-election to Howard.
Thomas Alberter Chandler	Republican	1st	March 4, 1921 – March 3, 1923	Elected in 1920. Lost re-election to Howard.
Tom Coburn	Republican	2nd	January 3, 1995 – January 3, 2001	Elected in 1994. Retired.
Tom Cole	Republican	4th	January 3, 2003 – present	Elected in 2002. Incumbent.
Charles E. Creager	Republican	3rd	March 4, 1909 – March 3, 1911	Elected in 1908. Lost re-election to Davenport.
James S. Davenport	Democratic	3rd	November 16, 1907 – March 3, 1909	Elected in 1907. Lost re-election.
James S. Davenport	Democratic	3rd	March 4, 1911 – March 3, 1915	Elected in 1910. Redistricted to the 1st district.
James S. Davenport	Democratic	1st	March 4, 1915 – March 3, 1917	Redistricted from the 3rd district and re-elected in 1914. Lost re-election to Chandler.
Wesley E. Disney	Democratic	1st	March 4, 1931 – January 3, 1945	Elected in 1930. Retired to run for U.S. Senator.
Ed Edmondson	Democratic	2nd	January 3, 1953 – January 3, 1973	Elected in 1952. Retired to run for U.S. Senator.
Mickey Edwards	Republican	5th	January 3, 1977 – January 3, 1993	Elected in 1976. Lost renomination to Istook.
Glenn English	Democratic	6th	January 3, 1975 – January 7, 1994	Elected in 1974. Resigned to become CEO of the NRECA
Mary Fallin	Republican	5th	January 3, 2007 – January 3, 2011	Elected in 2006. Retired to run for Governor of Oklahoma
Phil Ferguson	Democratic	8th	January 3, 1935 – January 3, 1941	Elected in 1934. Lost re-election to Rizley.
Scott Ferris	Democratic	5th	November 16, 1907 – March 3, 1915	Elected in 1907. Redistricted to the 6th district.
Scott Ferris	Democratic	6th	March 4, 1915 – March 3, 1921	Redistricted from the 5th district and re-elected in 1914. Retired to run for U.S. Senator.
Dennis Thomas Flynn	Republican	Territory	March 4, 1893 – March 3, 1897	Elected in 1892. Lost re-election to Callahan.
Dennis Thomas Flynn	Republican	Territory	March 4, 1899 – March 3, 1903	Elected in 1898. Declined nomination.
Elmer L. Fulton	Democratic	2nd	November 16, 1907 – March 3, 1909	Elected in 1907. Lost re-election to Morgan.
Milton C. Garber	Republican	8th	March 4, 1923 – March 3, 1933	Elected in 1922. Lost re-election to Marland.
Percy Lee Gassaway	Democratic	4th	January 3, 1935 – January 3, 1937	Elected in 1934. Lost renomination to Boren.
L. M. Gensman	Republican	6th	March 4, 1921 – March 3, 1923	Elected in 1920. Lost re-election to Thomas.
Dixie Gilmer	Democratic	1st	January 3, 1949 – January 3, 1951	Elected in 1948. Lost re-election to Schwabe.
John W. Harreld	Republican	5th	November 8, 1919 – March 3, 1921	Elected to finish J. Thompson's term Retired to run for U.S. Senator.
David Archibald Harvey	Republican	Territory	November 4, 1890 – March 3, 1893	Elected in 1890. Lost re-election to Flynn.
William Wirt Hastings	Democratic	2nd	March 4, 1915 – March 3, 1921	Elected in 1914. Lost re-election to Robertson.
William Wirt Hastings	Democratic	2nd	March 4, 1923 – January 3, 1935	Elected in 1922. Retired.
Manuel Herrick	Republican	8th	March 4, 1921 – March 3, 1923	Elected in 1920. Lost renomination to Garber.
Kevin Hern	Republican	1st	November 13, 2018 – present	Elected to finish Bridenstine's term and to the next term. Incumbent.
Robert Potter Hill	Democratic	5th	January 3, 1937 – October 29, 1937	Elected in 1936. Died.
Kendra Horn	Democratic	5th	January 3, 2019 – January 3, 2021	Elected in 2018. Lost re-election to Bice.
Everette B. Howard	Democratic	1st	March 4, 1919 – March 3, 1921	Elected in 1918. Lost re-election to Chandler.
Everette B. Howard	Democratic	1st	March 4, 1923 – March 3, 1925	Elected in 1922. Lost re-election to Montgomery.
Everette B. Howard	Democratic	1st	March 4, 1927 – March 3, 1929	Elected in 1926. Lost re-election to O'Connor.
James Inhofe	Republican	1st	January 3, 1987 – November 15, 1994	Elected in 1986. Resigned after being elected U.S. senator.
Ernest Istook	Republican	5th	January 3, 1993 – January 3, 2007	Elected in 1992. Retired to run for Governor of Oklahoma.
John Jarman	Democratic	5th	January 3, 1951 – January 24, 1975	Elected in 1950. Switched parties.
John Jarman	Republican	5th	January 24, 1975 – January 3, 1977	Re-elected in 1974, later sat as a Republican. Retired.
Glen D. Johnson	Democratic	4th	January 3, 1947 – January 3, 1949	Elected in 1946. Retired to run for U.S. Senator.
Jed Johnson	Democratic	6th	March 4, 1927 – January 3, 1947	Elected in 1926. Lost renomination to Morris.
Jed Johnson Jr.	Democratic	6th	January 3, 1965 – January 3, 1967	Elected in 1964. Lost re-election to J. Smith.
James R. Jones	Democratic	1st	January 3, 1973 – January 3, 1987	Elected in 1972. Retired to run for U.S. Senator.
James Lankford	Republican	5th	January 3, 2011 – January 3, 2015	Elected in 2010. Retired to run for U.S. Senator.
Steve Largent	Republican	1st	November 29, 1994 – February 15, 2002	Elected to finish Inhofe's term and to the next term. Resigned to run for Governor of Oklahoma.
Joshua B. Lee	Democratic	5th	January 3, 1935 – January 3, 1937	Elected in 1934. Retired to run for U.S. Senator.
Frank Lucas	Republican	6th	May 10, 1994 – January 3, 2003	Elected to finish English's term. Redistricted to the 3rd district.
Frank Lucas	Republican	3rd	January 3, 2003 – present.	Redistricted from the 6th district and re-elected in 2002. Incumbent
Ernest W. Marland	Democratic	8th	March 4, 1933 – January 3, 1935	Elected in 1932. Retired to run for Governor of Oklahoma.
Sam C. Massingale	Democratic	7th	January 3, 1935 – January 17, 1941	Elected in 1934. Died.
James V. McClintic	Democratic	7th	March 4, 1915 – January 3, 1935	Elected in 1914. Lost renomination to Massingale.
Dave McCurdy	Democratic	4th	January 3, 1981 – January 3, 1995	Elected in 1980. Retired to run for U.S. Senator.
Bird Segle McGuire	Republican	Territory	March 4, 1903 – March 3, 1907	Elected in 1902. Redistricted to the 1st upon statehood.
Bird Segle McGuire	Republican	1st	November 16, 1907 – March 3, 1915	Redistricted following statehood and re-elected in 1907. Retired.
Tom D. McKeown	Democratic	4th	March 4, 1917 – March 3, 1921	Elected in 1916. Lost re-election to Pringey.
Tom D. McKeown	Democratic	4th	March 4, 1923 – January 3, 1935	Elected in 1922. Lost renomination to Gassaway.
Clem McSpadden	Democratic	2nd	January 3, 1973 – January 3, 1975	Elected in 1972. Retired to run for Governor of Oklahoma.
A. S. Mike Monroney	Democratic	5th	January 3, 1939 – January 3, 1951	Elected in 1938. Retired to run for U.S. Senator
Samuel J. Montgomery	Republican	1st	March 4, 1925 – March 3, 1927	Elected in 1924. Lost re-election to Howard.
Dick T. Morgan	Republican	2nd	March 4, 1909 – March 3, 1915	Elected in 1908. Redistricted to the 8th district.
Dick T. Morgan	Republican	8th	March 4, 1915 – July 4, 1920	Redistricted from the 2nd district and re-elected in 1914. Died.
Toby Morris	Democratic	6th	January 3, 1947 – January 3, 1953	Elected in 1946. Lost renomination to Wickersham.
Toby Morris	Democratic	6th	January 3, 1957 – January 3, 1961	Elected in 1956. Lost renomination to Wickersham.
Markwayne Mullin	Republican	2nd	January 3, 2013 – January 3, 2023	Elected in 2012. Retired to run for U.S. senator.
William H. Murray	Democratic	At-large	March 4, 1913 – March 3, 1915	Elected in 1912. Redistricted to the 4th after seat was eliminated.
William H. Murray	Democratic	4th	March 4, 1915 – March 3, 1917	Redistricted from the at-large seat and re-elected in 1914. Lost renomination to McKeown.
John Conover Nichols	Democratic	2nd	January 3, 1935 – July 3, 1943	Elected in 1934. Resigned to become VP of TWA.
Charles O'Connor	Republican	1st	March 4, 1929 – March 3, 1931	Elected in 1928. Lost re-election to Disney.
Preston E. Peden	Democratic	7th	January 3, 1947 – January 3, 1949	Elected in 1946. Lost renomination to Wickersham.
Joseph C. Pringey	Republican	4th	March 4, 1921 – March 4, 1923	Elected in 1920. Lost re-election to McKeown.
Ted Risenhoover	Democratic	2nd	January 3, 1975 – January 3, 1979	Elected in 1974. Lost renomination to Synar.
Ross Rizley	Republican	8th	January 3, 1941 – January 3, 1949	Elected in 1940. Retired to run for U.S. Senator.
Alice Mary Robertson	Republican	2nd	March 4, 1921 – March 4, 1923	Elected in 1920. Lost re-election to Hastings.
Will Rogers	Democratic	At-large	March 4, 1933 – January 3, 1943	Elected in 1932. Retired.
Steve Russell	Republican	5th	January 3, 2015 – January 3, 2019	Elected in 2014. Lost re-election to Horn.
George B. Schwabe	Republican	1st	January 3, 1945 – January 3, 1949	Elected in 1944. Lost re-election to Gilmer.
George B. Schwabe	Republican	1st	January 3, 1951 – April 2, 1952	Elected in 1950. Died.
Gomer Griffith Smith	Democratic	5th	December 10, 1937 – January 3, 1939	Elected to finish Hill's term. Retired to run for U.S. Senator.
James Vernon Smith	Republican	6th	January 3, 1967 – January 3, 1969	Elected in 1966. Redistricted to the 4th district and lost re-election to Steed.
Tom Steed	Democratic	4th	January 3, 1949 – January 3, 1981	Elected in 1948. Retired.
Paul Stewart	Democratic	3rd	January 3, 1943 – January 3, 1947	Elected in 1942. Retired.
William G. Stigler	Democratic	2nd	March 28, 1944 – August 21, 1952	Elected to finish Nichols's term. Died.
Ulysses S. Stone	Republican	5th	March 4, 1929 – March 3, 1931	Elected in 1928. Lost re-election to Swank.
John Sullivan	Republican	1st	February 15, 2002 – January 3, 2013	Elected to finish Largent's term. Lost renomination to Bridenstine.
Fletcher B. Swank	Democratic	5th	March 4, 1921 – March 3, 1929	Elected in 1920. Lost re-election to Stone.
Fletcher B. Swank	Democratic	5th	March 4, 1931 – January 3, 1935	Elected again in 1930. Lost renomination to Lee.
Charles Swindall	Republican	8th	November 2, 1920 – March 3, 1921	Elected to finish Morgan's term. Lost renomination to Herrick.
Mike Synar	Democratic	2nd	January 3, 1979 – January 3, 1995	Elected in 1978. Lost renomination to Virgil R. Cooper.
Elmer Thomas	Democratic	6th	March 4, 1923 – March 3, 1927	Elected in 1922. Retired to run for U.S. Senator.
Joseph Bryan Thompson	Democratic	At-large	March 4, 1913 – March 3, 1915	Elected in 1912. Redistricted to the 5th after seat was eliminated.
Joseph Bryan Thompson	Democratic	5th	March 4, 1915 – September 18, 1919	Redistricted from the at-large district and re-elected in 1914. Died.
Wes Watkins	Democratic	3rd	January 3, 1977 – January 3, 1991	Elected in 1976. Retired to run for Governor of Oklahoma.
Wes Watkins	Republican	3rd	January 3, 1997 – January 3, 2003	Elected in 1996. Retired.
J. C. Watts	Republican	4th	January 3, 1995 – January 3, 2003	Elected in 1994. Retired.
Claude Weaver	Democratic	At-large	March 4, 1913 – March 3, 1915	Elected in 1912. Redistricted to the 5th but lost renomination to Thompson.
Victor Wickersham	Democratic	7th	April 1, 1941 – January 3, 1947	Elected to finish Massingale's term. Lost renomination to Peden.
Victor Wickersham	Democratic	7th	January 3, 1949 – January 3, 1953	Elected in 1948. Redistricted to the 6th district.
Victor Wickersham	Democratic	6th	January 3, 1953 – January 3, 1957	Redistricted from the 7th district and re-elected in 1952. Lost renomination to Morris.
Victor Wickersham	Democratic	6th	January 3, 1961 – January 3, 1965	Elected in 1960. Lost renomination to J. Johnson Jr.
George H. Wilson	Democratic	8th	January 3, 1949 – January 3, 1951	Elected in 1948. Lost re-election to Belcher.

== See also ==
- List of United States senators from Oklahoma
- Oklahoma's congressional delegations
- Oklahoma's congressional districts
