= 1907 United States House of Representatives elections in Oklahoma =

- September 17, 1907

All 5 Oklahoma seats to the United States House of Representatives
	Majority party	Minority party
Party	Democratic	Republican
Seats before	New	New
Seats won	4	1
Seat change	▲4	▲1
Popular vote	136,096	101,668
Percentage	56.0%	41.9%

The 1907 United States House of Representatives elections in Oklahoma were held on September 17, 1907, to elect the five U.S. representatives from the state of Oklahoma, which was set to be admitted to the Union on November 16, 1907. Members were elected to short terms that would last the remainder of the 60th Congress.

Upon statehood, Oklahoma was delegated five congressional districts, which were held by four Democratic representatives and one Republican. The 1st, 2nd, and 5th districts contained the obsolete Oklahoma Territory, while the 3rd and 4th districts consisted of the adjacent Indian Territory.

== Overview ==
1907 United States House of Representatives elections in Oklahoma
Party	Votes	Percentage	Seats before	Seats after	+/–
Democratic	136,096	56.04%	0	4	+4
Republican	101,668	41.87%	0	1	+1
Socialist	5,083	2.09%	0	0	0
Totals	242,847	100.00%	0	5	+5

Popular vote
Democratic	56.04%
Republican	41.87%
Socialist	2.09%

House seats
Democratic	80.00%
Republican	20.00%

== District 1 ==
1907 Oklahoma's 1st congressional district election
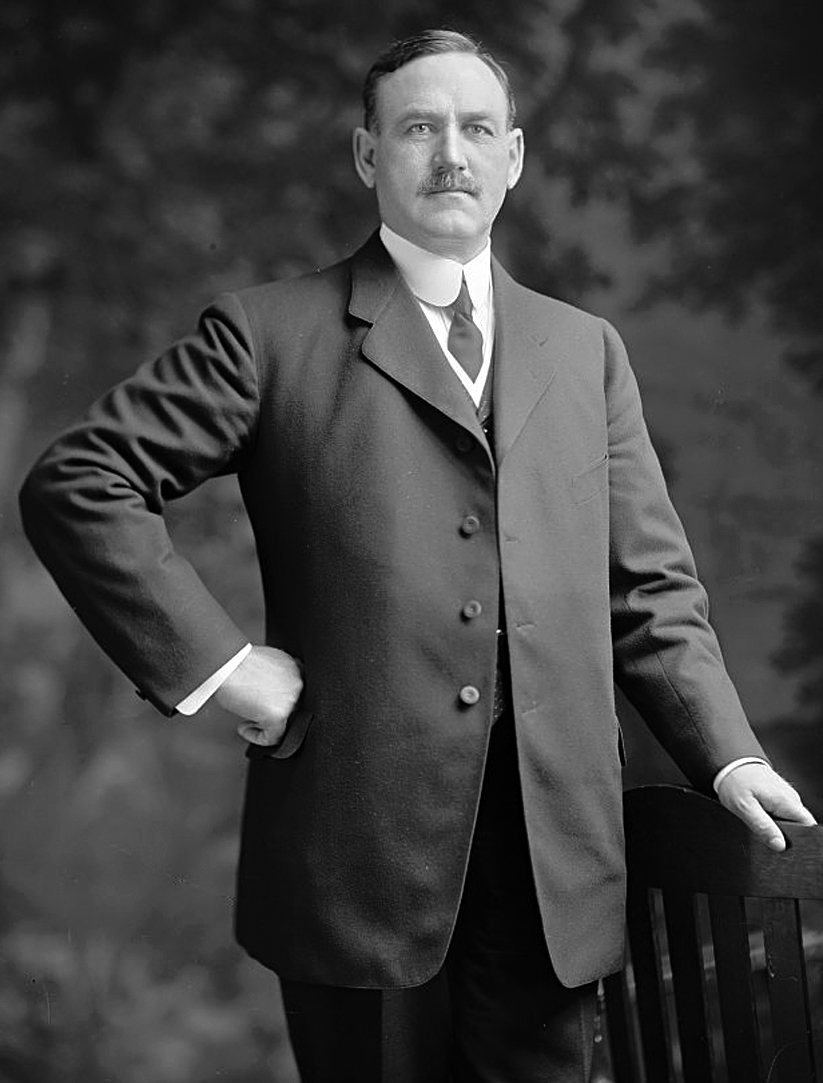

Nominee	Bird Segle McGuire	William L. Eagleton
Party	Republican	Democratic
Popular vote	22,362	21,003
Percentage	50.3%	47.3%
Elected U.S. Representative
Bird Segle McGuire
Republican

1907 Oklahoma's 1st congressional district election
Party	Candidate	Votes	%
Republican	Bird Segle McGuire	22,362	50.3
Democratic	William L. Eagleton	21,003	47.3
Socialist	Achilles W. Renshaw	1,062	2.4
Total votes		44,427	100
Republican win (new seat)			

== District 2 ==
1907 Oklahoma's 2nd congressional district election
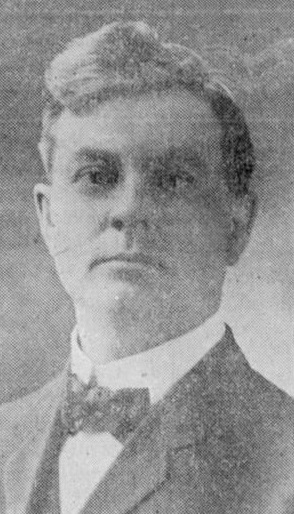

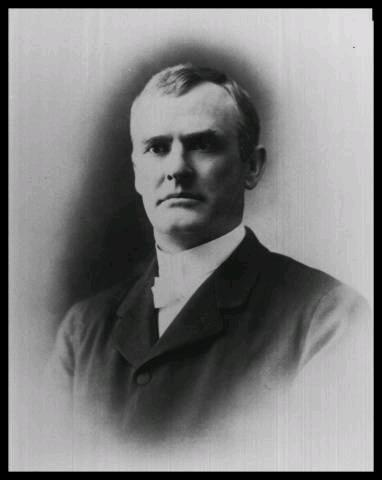
Nominee	Elmer L. Fulton	Thompson Benton Ferguson
Party	Democratic	Republican
Popular vote	26,006	25,028
Percentage	50.9%	49.1%
Elected U.S. Representative
Elmer L. Fulton
Democratic

1907 Oklahoma's 2nd congressional district election
Party	Candidate	Votes	%
Democratic	Elmer L. Fulton	26,006	50.9
Republican	Thompson Benton Ferguson	25,028	49.1
Total votes		51,034	100
Democratic win (new seat)			

== District 3 ==
1907 Oklahoma's 3rd congressional district election
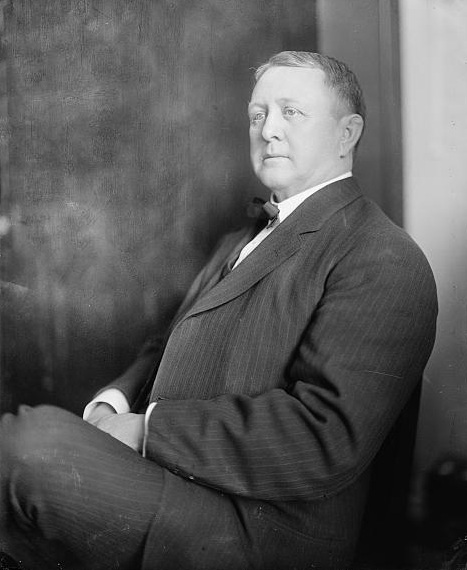

Nominee	James S. Davenport	Frank C. Hubbard
Party	Democratic	Republican
Popular vote	26,371	23,643
Percentage	52.7%	47.3%
Elected U.S. Representative
James S. Davenport
Democratic

1907 Oklahoma's 3rd congressional district election
Party	Candidate	Votes	%
Democratic	James S. Davenport	26,371	52.7
Republican	Frank C. Hubbard	23,643	47.3
Total votes		50,014	100
Democratic win (new seat)			

== District 4 ==
1907 Oklahoma's 4th congressional district election
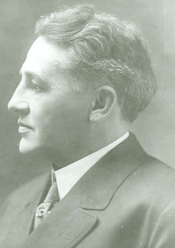

Nominee	Charles D. Carter	Loren G. Disney
Party	Democratic	Republican
Popular vote	29,856	15,925
Percentage	62.4%	33.2%
Elected U.S. Representative
Charles D. Carter
Democratic

1907 Oklahoma's 4th congressional district election
Party	Candidate	Votes	%
Democratic	Charles D. Carter	29,856	62.4
Republican	Loren G. Disney	15,925	33.2
Socialist	J. T. Cumbie	2,065	4.3
Total votes		47,846	100
Democratic win (new seat)			

== District 5 ==
1907 Oklahoma's 5th congressional district election
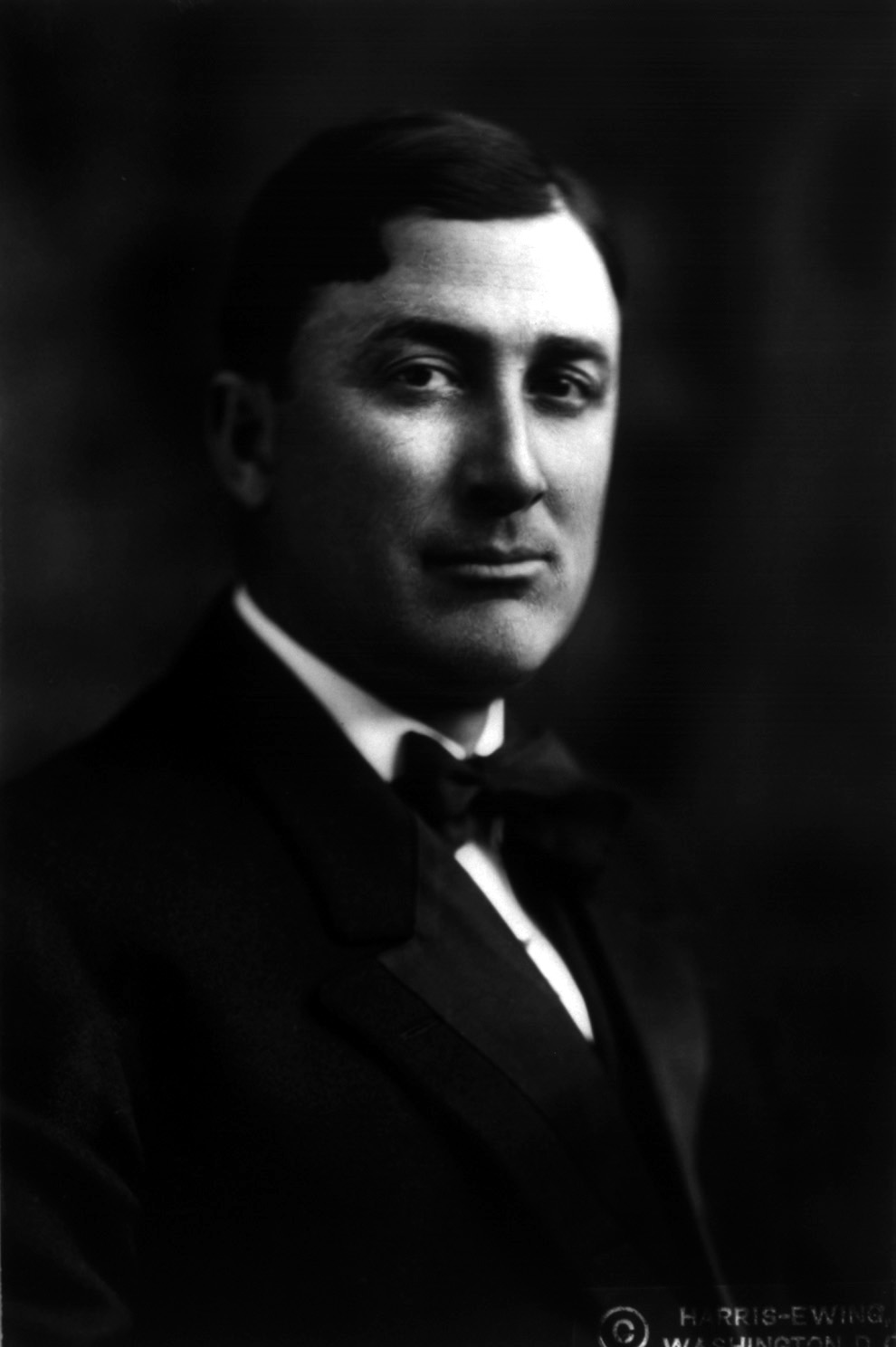

Nominee	Scott Ferris	Henry D. McKnight
Party	Democratic	Republican
Popular vote	32,935	14,883
Percentage	66.2%	29.2%
Elected U.S. Representative
Scott Ferris
Democratic

1907 Oklahoma's 5th congressional district election
Party	Candidate	Votes	%
Democratic	Scott Ferris	32,935	66.2
Republican	Henry D. McKnight	14,883	29.9
Socialist	Wood Hubbard	1,956	3.9
Total votes		49,774	100
Democratic win (new seat)			

== See also ==
- 1907 Oklahoma elections
- 1907 United States House of Representatives elections
