= 1908 United States House of Representatives elections in Oklahoma =

- November 3, 1908

All 5 Oklahoma seats to the United States House of Representatives
	Majority party	Minority party	Third party
Party	Republican	Democratic	Socialist
Seats before	1	4	0
Seats won	3	2	0
Seat change	▲2	▼2	Steady
Popular vote	109,413	122,804	20,766
Percentage	43.25%	48.54%	8.21%
Swing	▲1.38%	▼7.50%	▲6.12%

The 1908 United States House of Representatives elections in Oklahoma were held on November 3, 1908, to elect the five U.S. representatives from the state of Oklahoma, one from each of the state's five congressional districts. Members were elected to full terms that would begin at the start of the 61st Congress. These elections were held concurrently with the 1908 presidential election.

Despite winning the popular vote, the Democratic Party lost seats to the Republican Party, who gained a majority of seats. The Socialist Party also managed to gain popularity in the newly founded state.

== Overview ==
1907 United States House of Representatives elections in Oklahoma
Party	Votes	Percentage	Seats before	Seats after	+/–
Republican	109,413	43.25%	1	3	+2
Democratic	122,804	48.54%	4	2	–2
Socialist	20,766	8.21%	0	0	0
Totals	252,983	100.00%	5	5	–

Popular vote
Democratic	48.54%
Republican	43.25%
Socialist	8.21%

House seats
Republican	60.00%
Democratic	40.00%

== District 1 ==
1908 Oklahoma's 1st congressional district election
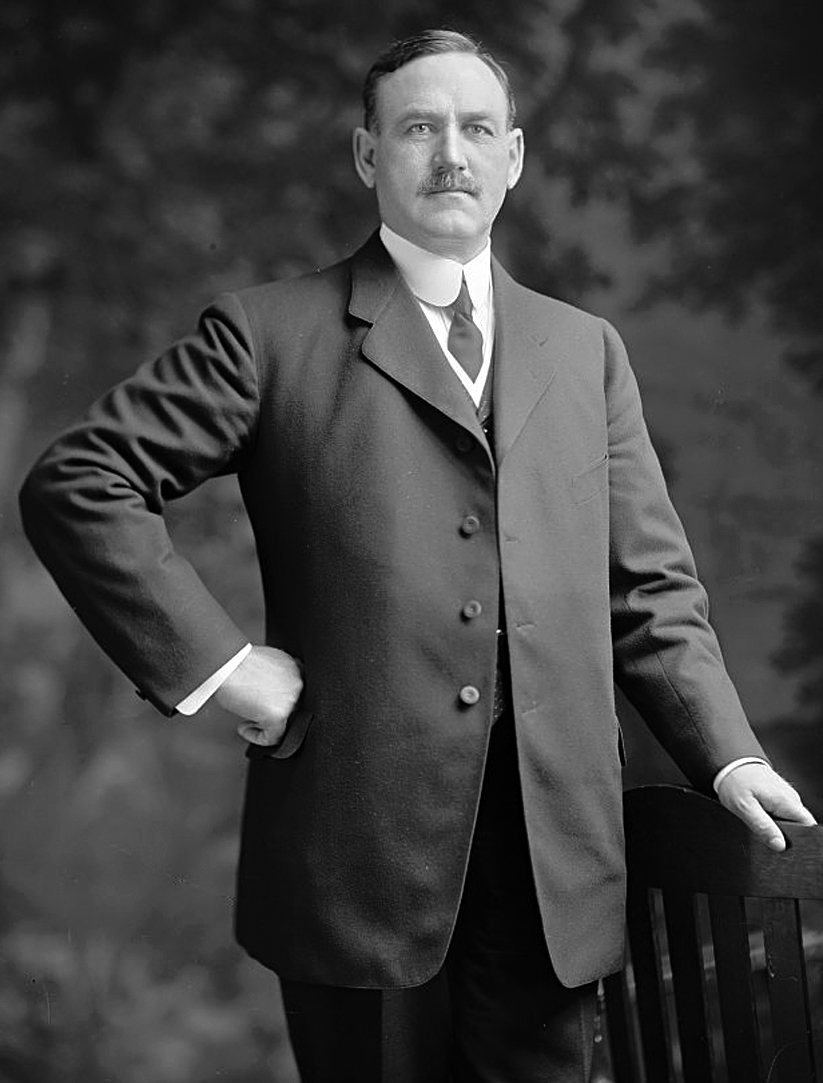
Nominee	Bird Segle McGuire	Henry S. Johnston
Party	Republican	Democratic
Popular vote	23,312	20,501
Percentage	50.6%	44.5%
U.S. Representative before election
Bird Segle McGuire
Republican
Elected U.S. Representative
Bird Segle McGuire
Republican

=== Democratic primary ===
1908 Oklahoma's 1st congressional district Democratic primary
Party	Candidate	Votes	%
Democratic	Henry S. Johnston	5,962	100%

=== Republican primary ===
1908 Oklahoma's 1st congressional Republican primary
Party	Candidate	Votes	%
Republican	Bird Segle McGuire (incumbent)	7,404	79.4%
Republican	Bayard T. Hainer	1,911	20.5%
Total votes		9,315	100%

=== Socialist primary ===
1908 Oklahoma's 1st congressional Socialist primary
Party	Candidate	Votes	%
Socialist	Achilles W. Renshaw	345	100%

=== General election ===
1908 Oklahoma's 1st congressional district election
Party	Candidate	Votes	%	±%
Republican	Bird Segle McGuire (incumbent)	23,312	50.6%	+0.3%
Democratic	Henry S. Johnston	20,501	44.5%	−2.8%
Socialist	Achilles W. Renshaw	2,249	4.9%	+2.5%
Total votes		46,062	100%	
Republican hold				

== District 2 ==
1908 Oklahoma's 2nd congressional district election
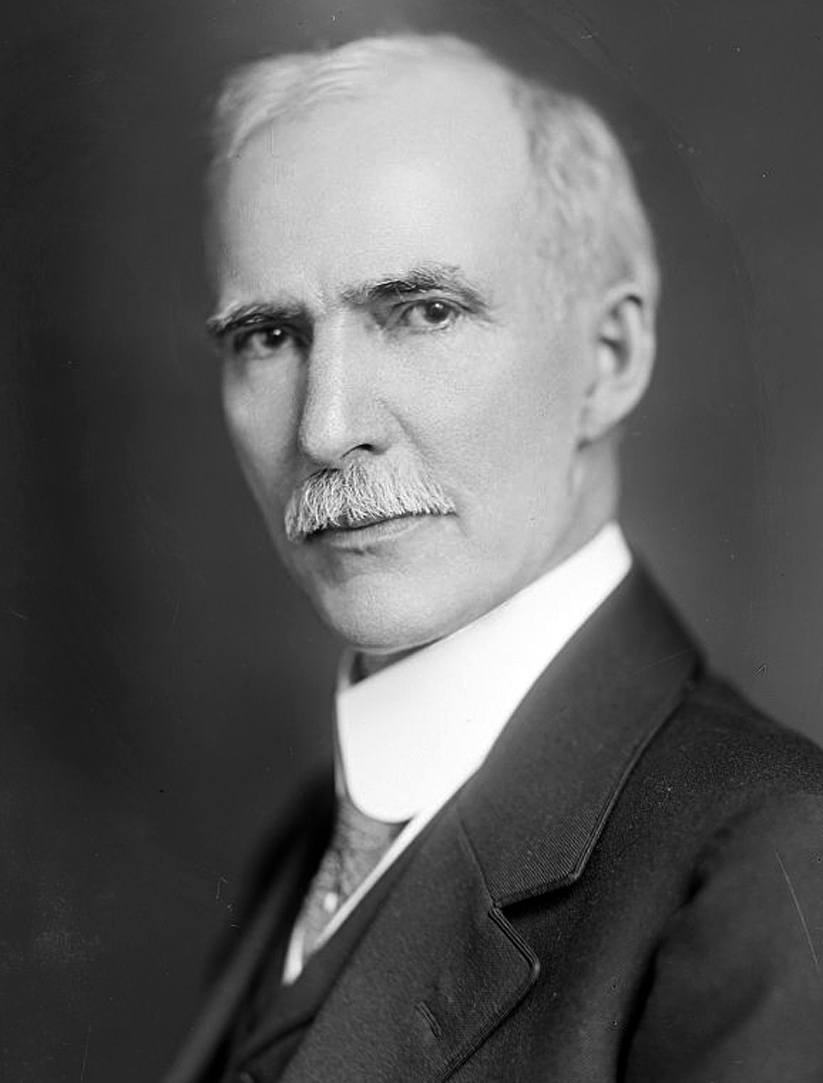

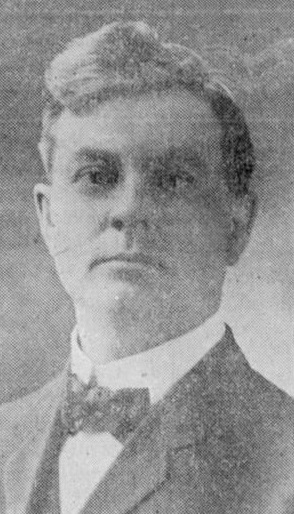
Nominee	Dick Thompson Morgan	Elmer L. Fulton
Party	Republican	Democratic
Popular vote	26,273	25,349
Percentage	46.9%	45.2%
Nominee	Charles P. Randall
Party	Socialist
Popular vote	4,443
Percentage	7.9%
U.S. Representative before election
Elmer L. Fulton
Democratic
Elected U.S. Representative
Dick Thompson Morgan
Republican

=== Democratic primary ===
1908 Oklahoma's 2nd congressional district Democratic primary
Party	Candidate	Votes	%
Democratic	Elmer L. Fulton	7,671	100%

=== Republican primary ===
1908 Oklahoma's 2nd congressional Republican primary
Party	Candidate	Votes	%
Republican	Dick Thompson Morgan	4,393	59.4%
Republican	Charles P. Lincoln	2,911	40.5%
Total votes		7,384	100%

=== Socialist primary ===
1908 Oklahoma's 2nd congressional Socialist primary
Party	Candidate	Votes	%
Socialist	Charles P. Randall	776	100%

=== General election ===
1908 Oklahoma's 2nd congressional district election
Party	Candidate	Votes	%	±%
Republican	Dick Thompson Morgan	26,273	46.9	−4.0%
Democratic	Elmer L. Fulton (incumbent)	25,349	45.2	−3.9%
Socialist	Charles P. Randall	4,443	7.9%	New
Total votes		56,065	100%	
Republican gain from Democratic				

== District 3 ==
1907 Oklahoma's 3rd congressional district election
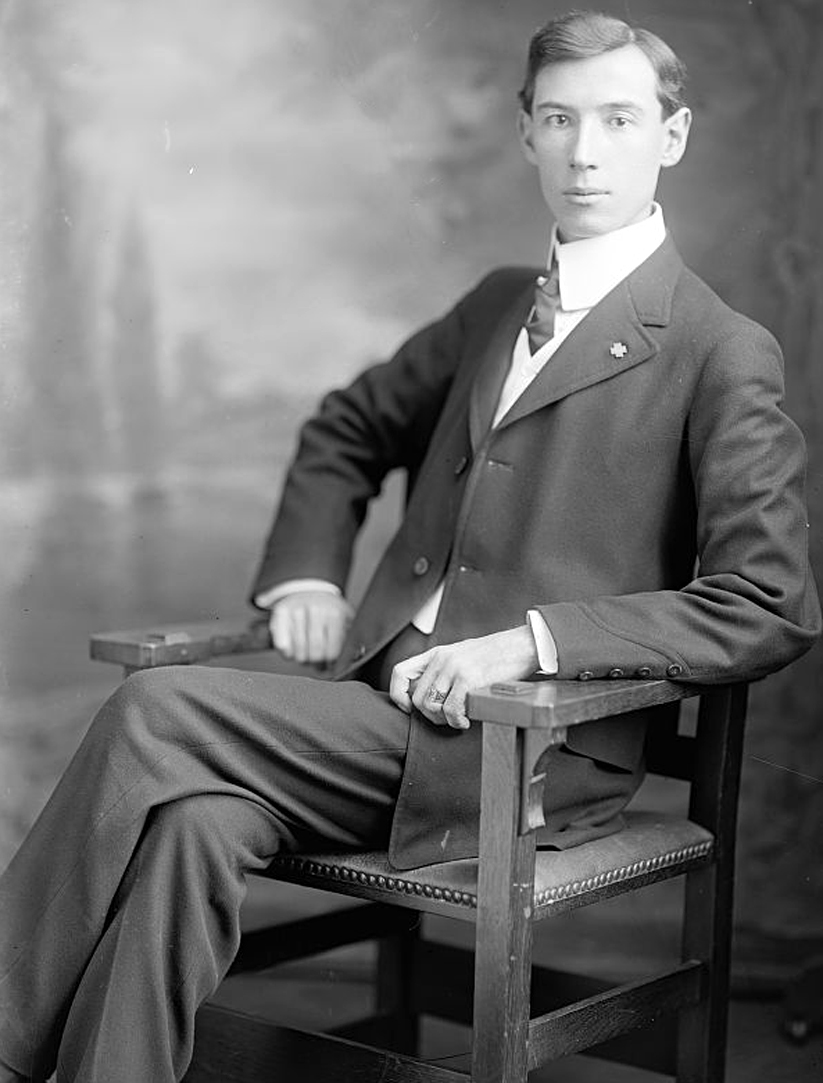

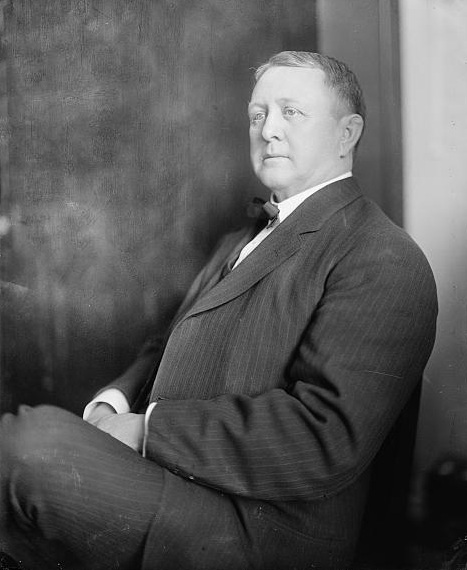
Nominee	Charles E. Creager	James S. Davenport
Party	Republican	Democratic
Popular vote	24,952	23,881
Percentage	48.3%	46.2%
Nominee	Winston T. Banks
Party	Socialist
Popular vote	2,827
Percentage	5.5%
U.S. Representative before election
James S. Davenport
Democratic
Elected U.S. Representative
Charles E. Creager
Republican

=== Democratic primary ===
1908 Oklahoma's 3rd congressional district Democratic primary
Party	Candidate	Votes	%
Democratic	James S. Davenport	7,673	100%

=== Republican primary ===
1908 Oklahoma's 3rd congressional Republican primary
Party	Candidate	Votes	%
Republican	Charles E. Creager	3,578	53.7%
Republican	H.E.P. Stanford	3,077	46.2%
Total votes		6,655	100%

=== Socialist primary ===
1908 Oklahoma's 3rd congressional Socialist primary
Party	Candidate	Votes	%
Socialist	Winston T. Banks	276	100%

=== General election ===
1908 Oklahoma's 3rd congressional district election
Party	Candidate	Votes	%	±%
Republican	Charles E. Creager	24,952	48.3	−4.4%
Democratic	James S. Davenport (incumbent)	23,881	46.2	−1.1%
Socialist	Winston T. Banks	2,827	5.5	New
Total votes		51,660	100%	
Republican gain from Democratic				

== District 4 ==
=== Democratic primary ===
1908 Oklahoma's 4th congressional district Democratic primary
Party	Candidate	Votes	%
Democratic	Charles D. Carter (incumbent)	11,288	100%

=== Republican primary ===
1908 Oklahoma's 4th congressional Republican primary
Party	Candidate	Votes	%
Republican	Benjamin F. Hackett	1,327	50.7%
Republican	E.N. Wright	1,289	49.2%
Total votes		2,616	100%

=== Socialist primary ===
1908 Oklahoma's 4th congressional Socialist primary
Party	Candidate	Votes	%
Socialist	M.C. Carter	1,511	100%

=== General election ===
1908 Oklahoma's 4th congressional district election
Party	Candidate	Votes	%	±%
Democratic	Charles D. Carter (incumbent)	22,047	50.6	−11.9%
Republican	Benjamin F. Hackett	15,727	36.1	+2.9%
Socialist	M. C. Carter	5,769	13.3	+9.0%
Total votes		43,543	100%	
Democratic hold		Swing	{{{swing}}}	

== District 5 ==
=== Democratic primary ===
1908 Oklahoma's 4th congressional district Democratic primary
Party	Candidate	Votes	%
Democratic	Scott Ferris (incumbent)	11,288	100%

=== Socialist primary ===
1908 Oklahoma's 4th congressional Socialist primary
Party	Candidate	Votes	%
Socialist	W.D. Davis	323	100%

=== General election ===
1908 Oklahoma's 5th congressional district election
Party	Candidate	Votes	%	±%
Democratic	Scott Ferris (incumbent)	31,026	55.8	−10.5%
Republican	Thompson (Note: Full name unknown)	19,149	34.4	+4.5%
Socialist	W. D. Davis	5,478	9.8	+5.9%
Total votes		55,653	100%	
Democratic hold				
