= 1910 United States House of Representatives elections in Oklahoma =

- November 8, 1910

All 5 Oklahoma seats to the United States House of Representatives
	Majority party	Minority party
Party	Republican	Democratic
Last election	3	2
Seats won	2	3

The 1910 United States House of Representatives elections in Oklahoma were held on November 8, 1910, to elect the five U.S. representatives from the State of Oklahoma, one from each of the state's congressional districts. The primary elections for the Republican, Democratic, and Socialist parties' nominations took place on August 2, 1910.

== District 1 ==
=== Democratic primary ===
1910 Oklahoma's 1st congressional district Democratic primary (August 2, 1910)
Party	Candidate	Votes	%
Democratic	Neil E. McNeil	3,747	33.4%
Democratic	James Kirkwood	3,305	29.4%
Democratic	Randolph Cook	2,954	26.3%
Democratic	C. L. Pinkham	1,121	10.7%
Turnout		11,217	

=== Republican primary ===
1910 Oklahoma's 1st congressional district Republican primary (August 2, 1910)
Party	Candidate	Votes	%
Republican	Bird Segle McGuire (incumbent)	9,042	54.4%
Republican	Milton C. Garber	6,412	38.6%
Republican	John Golobie	1,145	6.8%
Turnout		16,599	

=== Socialist primary ===
1910 Oklahoma's 1st congressional district Socialist primary (August 2, 1910)
Party	Candidate	Votes	%
Socialist	W. L. Reynolds	681	74.9%
Socialist	D. L. Bueford	228	25.0%
Turnout		909	

=== General election ===
1910 Oklahoma's 1st congressional district election
Party	Candidate	Votes	%	±%
Republican	Bird Segle McGuire (incumbent)	20,301	49.2%	−1.4%
Democratic	Neil E. McNeil	18,415	44.6%	+0.1%
Socialist	W. L. Reynolds	2,522	6.1%	+1.2%
Turnout		41,238	100%	

== District 2 ==
=== Democratic primary ===
1910 Oklahoma's 2nd congressional district Democratic primary (August 2, 1910)
Party	Candidate	Votes	%
Democratic	Elmer L. Fulton	9,518	52.5%
Democratic	John L. Gerlach	4,452	24.5%
Democratic	James W. Johnson	4,156	22.9%
Turnout		18,126	

=== Republican primary ===
1910 Oklahoma's 2nd congressional district Republican primary (August 2, 1910)
Party	Candidate	Votes	%
Republican	Dick Thompson Morgan (incumbent)	7,632	59.7%
Republican	Joe R. Sherman	2,564	20.0%
Republican	James H. Norton	1,487	11.6%
Republican	George W. Patridge	1,081	8.4%
Turnout		12,764	

=== Socialist primary ===
1910 Oklahoma's 2nd congressional district Socialist primary (August 2, 1910)
Party	Candidate	Votes	%
Socialist	H. I. Bryant	1,846	100%

=== General election ===
1910 Oklahoma's 2nd congressional district election
Party	Candidate	Votes	%	±%
Republican	Dick Thompson Morgan (incumbent)	25,134	46.0%	−0.9
Democratic	Elmer L. Fulton	18,415	44.0%	−1.2%
Socialist	H.I. Bryant	5,382	9.8%	+1.9%
Turnout		54,578	100%	

== District 3 ==
=== Democratic primary ===
1910 Oklahoma's 3rd congressional district Democratic primary (August 2, 1910)
Party	Candidate	Votes	%
Democratic	James S. Davenport	10,998	47.8%
Democratic	S. L. Johnson	5,807	27.7%
Democratic	Campbell Russell	4,406	21.0%
Democratic	Kenneth S. Murchinson	692	3.3%
Turnout		20,913	

=== Republican primary ===
1910 Oklahoma's 3rd congressional district Republican primary (August 2, 1910)
Party	Candidate	Votes	%
Republican	Charles E. Creager (incumbent)	9,479	50.7%
Republican	R.T. Daniels	6,225	33.3%
Republican	H. E. P. Stanford	2,960	15.8%
Turnout		18,664	

=== Socialist primary ===
1910 Oklahoma's 3rd congressional district Socialist primary (August 2, 1910)
Party	Candidate	Votes	%
Socialist	G. M. Snyder	1,846	100%

=== General election ===
1910 Oklahoma's 3rd congressional district election
Party	Candidate	Votes	%	±%
Democratic	James S. Davenport	25,134	50.6%	+4.4%
Republican	Charles E. Creager (incumbent)	21,767	43.5%	−4.8%
Socialist	G.M. Snyder	2,932	5.8%	+0.3%
Turnout		50,011	100%	

== District 4 ==
=== Republican primary ===
1910 Oklahoma's 4th congressional district Republican primary (August 2, 1910)
Party	Candidate	Votes	%
Republican	Charles E. Campbell	6,554	100%

=== Socialist primary ===
1910 Oklahoma's 4th congressional district Socialist primary (August 2, 1910)
Party	Candidate	Votes	%
Socialist	J. N. Gilmore	2,865	100%

=== General election ===
1910 Oklahoma's 4th congressional district election
Party	Candidate	Votes	%	±%
Democratic	Charles D. Carter (incumbent)	21,959	55.6%	+5.0%
Republican	Charles M. Campbell	11,979	30.3%	−5.8%
Socialist	J.N. Gilmore	5,534	14.0%	+0.7%
Turnout		39,472	100%	

== District 5 ==
=== Republican primary ===
1910 Oklahoma's 5th congressional district Republican primary (August 2, 1910)
Party	Candidate	Votes	%
Republican	J.H. Franklin	6,950	100%

=== Socialist primary ===
1910 Oklahoma's 5th congressional district Socialist primary (August 2, 1910)
Party	Candidate	Votes	%
Socialist	H. H. Stallard	2,798	100%

=== General election ===
1910 Oklahoma's 5th congressional district election
Party	Candidate	Votes	%	±%
Democratic	Scott Ferris (incumbent)	28,600	58.8%	+3.0%
Republican	J.H. Franklin	13,425	27.6%	−6.8%
Socialist	H.H. Stallard	6,539	14.0%	+4.2%
Turnout		39,472	100%	
