= Oklahoma's 3rd congressional district =

U.S. House district for Oklahoma

Coordinates: 36.0°N 98.5°W

- Interactive map of district boundaries since January 3, 2023
- Representative: Frank Lucas; R–Cheyenne
- Distribution: 50.71% urban; 49.29% rural
- Population (2025): 809,566
- Median household income: $61,833
- Ethnicity: 60.1% White; 20.3% Hispanic; 7.1% Two or more races; 5.5% Native American; 4.9% Black; 1.4% Asian; 0.7% other
- Cook PVI: R+23

Oklahoma's 3rd congressional district is the largest congressional district in the state, covering an area of 34,088.49 square miles, over 48 percent the state's land mass. The district is bordered by New Mexico, Colorado, Kansas, and the Texas panhandle. Altogether, the district includes (in whole or in part) a total of 32 counties, and covers more territory than the state's other four districts combined. It is one of the largest districts in the nation that does not cover an entire state.

The district has been represented by Republican Frank Lucas since 2003.

Prior to 2003, most of the territory now in the 3rd district was in the 6th district. Meanwhile, from 1915 to 2003, the 3rd district was located in southeastern Oklahoma, an area known as Little Dixie. It had a dramatically different voting history from the current 3rd; only one Republican ever won it. It was the district of Carl Albert, Speaker of the House from 1971 to 1977.

== Geography ==
The district borders New Mexico to the west, Colorado and Kansas to the north, and the Texas panhandle to the south. To the far west, the district includes the three counties of the Oklahoma Panhandle (Cimarron, Texas, Beaver), and also Harper, Ellis, Woodward, Woods, Major, Alfalfa, Grant, Garfield, Kay, Noble, Osage, Pawnee, Creek, Payne, Lincoln, Logan, Kingfisher, Blaine, Canadian, Dewey, Custer, Roger Mills, Beckham, Washita, Caddo, Kiowa, Greer, Harmon, and Jackson.

Some of the principal cities in the district include Guymon, Ponca City, Cheyenne, Enid, Stillwater, Yukon, Guthrie, and Altus. It also includes slivers of Oklahoma City and Tulsa.

== History ==
The political success of the Republican party in the region reflects changing patterns of party affiliation similar to changes across the South. Although northwest Oklahoma was settled by migrants from Kansas, who favored the Republican Party and the Union during the Civil War, the southeast was settled by conservative white Southerners. For decades they were affiliated with the United States Democratic Party and traditions of that region.

The Great Depression hurt the GOP. Since the late 20th century, party affiliations have changed, and today most white conservatives belong to the Republican Party here. It is now one of the most Republican districts in the nation. George W. Bush received 72 percent of the district's presidential vote in 2004.

Unlike the previous 3rd congressional district, a largely rural area, today half of the district's inhabitants are classified as urban, and 3 percent of adults working in the district use public transportation, ride a bike, or walk. The district's population is 5 percent Latino and 3 percent foreign-born.

== Recent election results from statewide races ==
Year	Office	Results
2008	President	McCain 69% - 29%
2012	President	Romney 71% - 29%
2016	President	Trump 70% - 25%
2016	Senate	Lankford 72% - 20%
2018	Governor	Stitt 59% - 37%
2018	Lt. Governor	Pinnell 67% - 30%
2018	Attorney General	Hunter 69% - 31%
2020	President	Trump 70% - 27%
2020	Senate	Inhofe 68% - 28%
2022	Senate (Reg.)	Lankford 70% - 26%
2022	Senate (Spec.)	Mullin 67% - 30%
2022	Governor	Stitt 61% - 36%
2022	Lt. Governor	Pinnell 70% - 26%
2022	Treasurer	Russ 70% - 25%
2024	President	Trump 71% - 27%

== Composition ==
For the 118th and successive Congresses (based on redistricting following the 2020 census), the district contains all or portions of the following counties and communities:

Alfalfa County (11)

All 11 communities

Beaver County (6)

All 6 communities

Beckham County (6)

All 6 communities

Blaine County (10)

All 10 communities

Caddo County (13)

All 13 communities

Canadian County (6)

Calumet, Cedar Lake, El Reno, Mustang, Oklahoma City (part; also 4th and 5th; shared with Cleveland, Oklahoma and Pottawatomie counties), Union City

Cimarron County (4)

All 4 communities

Creek County (13)

Bristow, Depew, Drumright, Kellyville, Lawrence Creek, Manford, Milfay, Oilton, Olive, Sapulpa (part; also 1st; shared with Tulsa County), Shamrock, Shroud, Slick

Custer County (7)

All 7 communities

Dewey County (7)

All 7 communities

Ellis County (4)

All 4 communities

Garfield County (15)

All 15 communities

Grant County (9)

All 9 communities

Harmon County (2)

Gould, Hollis

Harper County (4)

All 4 communities

Jackson County (9)

All 9 communities

Kay County (1)

All 11 communities

Kingfisher County (6)

All 6 communities

Kiowa County (8)

All 8 communities

Logan County (5)

Crescent, Crescent Springs, Lovell, Marshall, Mulhall (shared with Payne County), Orlando (shared with Payne County)

Major County (7)

All 7 communities

Noble County (7)

All 7 communities

Oklahoma County (1)

Oklahoma City (part; also 4th and 5th; shared with Canadian, Cleveland, and Pottawatomie counties)

Osage County (23)

All 23 communities

Pawnee County (11)

All 11 communities

Payne County (12)

All 12 communities

Roger Mills County (5)

All 5 communities

Texas County (7)

All 7 communities

Washita County (11)

All 11 communities

Woods County (7)

All 7 communities

Woodward County (5)

All 5 communities

== List of members representing the district ==
Name	Party	Years	Cong ress	Electoral history	Location
District established November 16, 1907
James S. Davenport (Vinita)	Democratic	November 16, 1907 – March 3, 1909	60th	Elected in 1907. Lost re-election.	
Charles E. Creager (Muskogee)	Republican	March 4, 1909 – March 3, 1911	61st	Elected in 1908. Lost re-election.	
James S. Davenport (Vinita)	Democratic	March 4, 1911 – March 3, 1915	62nd 63rd	Elected in 1910. Re-elected in 1912. Redistricted to the 1st district.	
Charles D. Carter (Ardmore)	Democratic	March 4, 1915 – March 3, 1927	64th 65th 66th 67th 68th 69th	Redistricted from the 4th district and re-elected in 1914. Re-elected in 1916. Re-elected in 1918. Re-elected in 1920. Re-elected in 1922. Re-elected in 1924. Lost renomination.	
Wilburn Cartwright (McAlester)	Democratic	March 4, 1927 – January 3, 1943	70th 71st 72nd 73rd 74th 75th 76th 77th	Elected in 1926. Re-elected in 1928. Re-elected in 1930. Re-elected in 1932. Re-elected in 1934. Re-elected in 1936. Re-elected in 1938. Re-elected in 1940. Lost renomination.	
Paul Stewart (Antlers)	Democratic	January 3, 1943 – January 3, 1947	78th 79th	Elected in 1942. Re-elected in 1944. Retired.	
Carl Albert (McAlester)	Democratic	January 3, 1947 – January 3, 1977	80th 81st 82nd 83rd 84th 85th 86th 87th 88th 89th 90th 91st 92nd 93rd 94th	Elected in 1946. Re-elected in 1948. Re-elected in 1950. Re-elected in 1952. Re-elected in 1954. Re-elected in 1956. Re-elected in 1958. Re-elected in 1960. Re-elected in 1962. Re-elected in 1964. Re-elected in 1966. Re-elected in 1968. Re-elected in 1970. Re-elected in 1972. Re-elected in 1974. Retired.	
Wes Watkins (Ada)	Democratic	January 3, 1977 – January 3, 1991	95th 96th 97th 98th 99th 100th 101st	Elected in 1976. Re-elected in 1978. Re-elected in 1980. Re-elected in 1982. Re-elected in 1984. Re-elected in 1986. Re-elected in 1988. Retired to run for Oklahoma Governor.	
Bill Brewster (Marietta)	Democratic	January 3, 1991 – January 3, 1997	102nd 103rd 104th	Elected in 1990. Re-elected in 1992. Re-elected in 1994. Retired.	
Wes Watkins (Stillwater)	Republican	January 3, 1997 – January 3, 2003	105th 106th 107th	Elected again in 1996. Re-elected in 1998. Re-elected in 2000. Retired.	
Frank Lucas (Cheyenne)	Republican	January 3, 2003 – present	108th 109th 110th 111th 112th 113th 114th 115th 116th 117th 118th 119th	Redistricted from the 6th district and re-elected in 2002. Re-elected in 2004. Re-elected in 2006. Re-elected in 2008. Re-elected in 2010. Re-elected in 2012. Re-elected in 2014. Re-elected in 2016. Re-elected in 2018. Re-elected in 2020. Re-elected in 2022. Re-elected in 2024. Re-elected in 2026.	2003–2013
Frank Lucas (Cheyenne)	Republican	January 3, 2003 – present	108th 109th 110th 111th 112th 113th 114th 115th 116th 117th 118th 119th	Redistricted from the 6th district and re-elected in 2002. Re-elected in 2004. Re-elected in 2006. Re-elected in 2008. Re-elected in 2010. Re-elected in 2012. Re-elected in 2014. Re-elected in 2016. Re-elected in 2018. Re-elected in 2020. Re-elected in 2022. Re-elected in 2024. Re-elected in 2026.	2013–2023
Frank Lucas (Cheyenne)	Republican	January 3, 2003 – present	108th 109th 110th 111th 112th 113th 114th 115th 116th 117th 118th 119th	Redistricted from the 6th district and re-elected in 2002. Re-elected in 2004. Re-elected in 2006. Re-elected in 2008. Re-elected in 2010. Re-elected in 2012. Re-elected in 2014. Re-elected in 2016. Re-elected in 2018. Re-elected in 2020. Re-elected in 2022. Re-elected in 2024. Re-elected in 2026.	2023–present

== Recent election results ==
=== 2012 ===
Oklahoma's 3rd congressional district, 2012
Party	Candidate	Votes	%
Republican	Frank Lucas (incumbent)	201,744	75.3
Democratic	Timothy Ray Murray	53,472	20.0
Independent	William M. Sanders	12,787	4.8
Total votes		268,003	100.0
Republican hold			

=== 2014 ===
Oklahoma's 3rd congressional district, 2014
Party	Candidate	Votes	%
Republican	Frank Lucas (incumbent)	133,335	78.6
Democratic	Frankie Robbins	36,270	21.4
Total votes		169,605	100.0
Republican hold			

=== 2016 ===
Oklahoma's 3rd congressional district, 2016
Party	Candidate	Votes	%
Republican	Frank Lucas (incumbent)	227,525	78.3
Democratic	Frankie Robbins	63,090	21.7
Total votes		290,615	100.0
Republican hold			

=== 2018 ===
Oklahoma's 3rd congressional district, 2018
Party	Candidate	Votes	%
Republican	Frank Lucas (incumbent)	172,913	73.9
Democratic	Frankie Robbins	61,152	26.1
Total votes		234,065	100.0
Republican hold			

=== 2020 ===
Oklahoma's 3rd congressional district, 2020
Party	Candidate	Votes	%
Republican	Frank Lucas (incumbent)	242,677	78.5
Democratic	Zoe Midyett	66,501	21.5
Total votes		309,178	100.0
Republican hold			

=== 2022 ===
Oklahoma's 3rd congressional district, 2022
Party	Candidate	Votes	%
Republican	Frank Lucas (incumbent)	147,418	74.5
Democratic	Jeremiah Ross	50,354	25.4
Total votes		197,772	100.0
Republican hold			

=== 2024 ===
Oklahoma's 3rd congressional district, 2024
Party	Candidate	Votes	%
Republican	Frank Lucas (incumbent)	Uncontested	100%
Democratic	(no candidate)		
Total votes			100.0
Republican hold			

== See also ==
- Oklahoma's congressional districts
- List of United States congressional districts

U.S. House of Representatives
Preceded by Massachusetts's 9th congressional district	Home district of the speaker January 21, 1971 – January 3, 1977	Succeeded by Massachusetts's 8th congressional district
