= Oklahoma's 5th congressional district =

U.S. House district for Oklahoma

Coordinates: 35.4°N 97.2°W

- Interactive map of district boundaries since January 3, 2023
- Representative: Stephanie Bice; R–Oklahoma City
- Area: 2,073.9 mi^{2} (5,371 km^{2})
- Distribution: 87.53% urban; 12.47% rural
- Population (2025): 836,169
- Median household income: $78,527
- Ethnicity: 62.1% White; 11.5% Black; 9.9% Hispanic; 8.6% Two or more races; 4.1% Native American; 3.3% Asian; 0.5% other
- Cook PVI: R+9

Oklahoma's 5th congressional district is a congressional district in the U.S. state of Oklahoma. It borders all of the other congressional districts in the state except the 1st district. It is densely populated and covers most of Oklahoma County and all of Lincoln, Pottawatomie and Seminole counties, as well as parts of Canadian and Logan counties. With a Cook Partisan Voting Index rating of R+9, it is the least Republican district in Oklahoma, a state with an all-Republican congressional delegation.

Principal cities in the district include Oklahoma City (the state capital), Edmond, Shawnee, Seminole, and Yukon.

The district is currently represented by Republican Stephanie Bice. She was first elected in 2020, defeating one-term incumbent Democrat Kendra Horn.

== History ==
Prior to the opening of the 116th Congress on January 3, 2019, the district had been held by a Republican since January 23, 1975, when Democrat John Jarman changed political parties. Before Jarman, the seat had leaned Democratic since 1931.

Donald Trump received 53.2 percent of the vote in this district in 2016 and 51.4% of the vote in 2020.

Kendra Horn received 50.7 percent of the vote in 2018.

According to the APM Research Lab's Voter Profile Tools (featuring the U.S. Census Bureau's 2019 American Community Survey), the district contained about 572,000 potential voters (citizens, age 18+). Of these, 66% are White, 13% Black, and 9% Latino. Immigrants make up 5% of the district's potential voters. Median income among households (with one or more potential voter) in the district is about $55,800, while 13% of households live below the poverty line. As for the educational attainment of potential voters in the district, 10% of those 25 and older have not earned a high school degree, while 30% hold a bachelor's or higher degree.

In 2021, following Kendra Horn's 2018 election victory (and 2020 defeat), which made her the first Democrat to win the district in decades, the Republican-controlled Oklahoma legislature broke up the urban core of Oklahoma City by redistricting the predominantly Latino southwestern portions of the city, just under 181,000 Oklahoma County residents, to the safely Republican 3rd district, which decreased the district's total minority percentage. All of Lincoln and parts of Canadian and Logan counties were added into the district, with the new district being more safely Republican. This redistricting was criticized as gerrymandering by opponents.

== Recent election results from statewide races ==
Year	Office	Results
2008	President	McCain 63% - 36%
2012	President	Romney 64% - 36%
2016	President	Trump 59% - 34%
2016	Senate	Lankford 65% - 27%
2018	Governor	Stitt 48.4% - 48.2%
2018	Lt. Governor	Pinnell 57% - 39%
2018	Attorney General	Hunter 60% - 40%
2020	President	Trump 58% - 39%
2020	Senate	Inhofe 56% - 40%
2022	Senate (Reg.)	Lankford 58% - 39%
2022	Senate (Spec.)	Mullin 54% - 43%
2022	Governor	Hofmeister 48.7% - 48.7%
2022	Lt. Governor	Pinnell 58% - 38%
2022	Treasurer	Russ 58% - 37%
2024	President	Trump 58% - 40%

== Composition ==
For the 118th and successive Congresses (based on redistricting following the 2020 census), the district contains all or portions of the following counties and communities:

Canadian County (3)

Oklahoma City (part; also 3rd and 4th; shared with Cleveland, Oklahoma, and Pottawatomie counties), Piedmont, Yukon

Lincoln County (14)

All 14 communities

Logan County (7)

Cashion, Cedar Valley, Coyle, Guthrie, Langston, Meridian, Seward

Oklahoma County (17)

Arcadia, Bethany, Choctaw, Edmond, Forest Park, Harrah, Jones, Lake Aluma, Luther, Midwest City (part; also 4th), Nichols Hills, Nicoma Park, Oklahoma City (part; also 3rd and 4th; shared with Canadian, Cleveland, and Pottawatomie counties), Spencer, The Village, Warr Acres, Woodlawn Park

Pottawatomie County (16)

All 16 communities

Seminole County (8)

All 8 communities

== List of members representing the district ==
Name	Party	Years	Cong ress	Electoral history	Location
District established November 16, 1907
Scott Ferris (Lawton)	Democratic	November 16, 1907 – March 3, 1915	60th 61st 62nd 63rd	Elected in 1907. Re-elected in 1908. Re-elected in 1910. Re-elected in 1912. Redistricted to the 6th district.	
Joseph Bryan Thompson (Pauls Valley)	Democratic	March 4, 1915 – September 18, 1919	64th 65th 66th	Redistricted from the at-large district and re-elected in 1914. Re-elected in 1916. Re-elected in 1918. Died.	
Vacant		September 18, 1919 – November 8, 1919	66th		
John W. Harreld (Oklahoma City)	Republican	November 8, 1919 – March 3, 1921	66th	Elected to finish Thompson's term Retired to run for U.S. Senator.	
Fletcher B. Swank (Norman)	Democratic	March 4, 1921 – March 3, 1929	67th 68th 69th 70th	Elected in 1920. Re-elected in 1922. Re-elected in 1924. Re-elected in 1926. Lost re-election.	
Ulysses S. Stone (Norman)	Republican	March 4, 1929 – March 3, 1931	71st	Elected in 1928. Lost re-election.	
Fletcher B. Swank (Norman)	Democratic	March 4, 1931 – January 3, 1935	72nd 73rd	Elected again in 1930. Re-elected in 1932. Lost renomination.	
Joshua B. Lee (Norman)	Democratic	January 3, 1935 – January 3, 1937	74th	Elected in 1934. Retired to run for U.S. Senator.	
Robert P. Hill (Oklahoma City)	Democratic	January 3, 1937 – October 29, 1937	75th	Elected in 1936. Died.	
Vacant		October 29, 1937 – December 10, 1937	75th		
Gomer Griffith Smith (Oklahoma City)	Democratic	December 10, 1937 – January 3, 1939	75th	Elected to finish Hill's term. Retired to run for U.S. Senator.	
Mike Monroney (Oklahoma City)	Democratic	January 3, 1939 – January 3, 1951	76th 77th 78th 79th 80th 81st	Elected in 1938. Re-elected in 1940. Re-elected in 1942. Re-elected in 1944. Re-elected in 1946. Re-elected in 1948. Retired to run for U.S. Senator.	
John Jarman (Oklahoma City)	Democratic	January 3, 1951 – January 24, 1975	82nd 83rd 84th 85th 86th 87th 88th 89th 90th 91st 92nd 93rd	Elected in 1950. Re-elected in 1952. Re-elected in 1954. Re-elected in 1956. Re-elected in 1958. Re-elected in 1960. Re-elected in 1962. Re-elected in 1964. Re-elected in 1966. Re-elected in 1968. Re-elected in 1970. Re-elected in 1972. Re-elected in 1974. Retired.	
John Jarman (Oklahoma City)	Republican	January 24, 1975 – January 3, 1977	94th	Elected in 1950. Re-elected in 1952. Re-elected in 1954. Re-elected in 1956. Re-elected in 1958. Re-elected in 1960. Re-elected in 1962. Re-elected in 1964. Re-elected in 1966. Re-elected in 1968. Re-elected in 1970. Re-elected in 1972. Re-elected in 1974. Retired.	
Mickey Edwards (Oklahoma City)	Republican	January 3, 1977 – January 3, 1993	95th 96th 97th 98th 99th 100th 101st 102nd	Elected in 1976. Re-elected in 1978. Re-elected in 1980. Re-elected in 1982. Re-elected in 1984. Re-elected in 1986. Re-elected in 1988. Re-elected in 1990. Lost renomination.	
Ernest Istook (Oklahoma City)	Republican	January 3, 1993 – January 3, 2007	103rd 104th 105th 106th 107th 108th 109th	Elected in 1992. Re-elected in 1994. Re-elected in 1996. Re-elected in 1998. Re-elected in 2000. Re-elected in 2002. Re-elected in 2004. Retired to run for Governor of Oklahoma.	1993–2003 [data missing]
Ernest Istook (Oklahoma City)	Republican	January 3, 1993 – January 3, 2007	103rd 104th 105th 106th 107th 108th 109th	Elected in 1992. Re-elected in 1994. Re-elected in 1996. Re-elected in 1998. Re-elected in 2000. Re-elected in 2002. Re-elected in 2004. Retired to run for Governor of Oklahoma.	2003–2013
Mary Fallin (Oklahoma City)	Republican	January 3, 2007 – January 3, 2011	110th 111th	Elected in 2006. Re-elected in 2008. Retired to take office as Governor of Oklahoma.	2003–2013
James Lankford (Oklahoma City)	Republican	January 3, 2011 – January 3, 2015	112th 113th	Elected in 2010. Re-elected in 2012. Retired to run for U.S. Senator.	2003–2013
James Lankford (Oklahoma City)	Republican	January 3, 2011 – January 3, 2015	112th 113th	Elected in 2010. Re-elected in 2012. Retired to run for U.S. Senator.	2013–2023
Steve Russell (Oklahoma City)	Republican	January 3, 2015 – January 3, 2019	114th 115th	Elected in 2014. Re-elected in 2016. Lost re-election.	2013–2023
Kendra Horn (Oklahoma City)	Democratic	January 3, 2019 – January 3, 2021	116th	Elected in 2018. Lost re-election.	2013–2023
Stephanie Bice (Oklahoma City)	Republican	January 3, 2021 – present	117th 118th 119th	Elected in 2020. Re-elected in 2022. Re-elected in 2024. Re-elected in 2026.	2013–2023
Stephanie Bice (Oklahoma City)	Republican	January 3, 2021 – present	117th 118th 119th	Elected in 2020. Re-elected in 2022. Re-elected in 2024. Re-elected in 2026.	2023–present

== Recent election results ==
=== 2006 ===
Oklahoma's 5th congressional district election, 2006
Party	Candidate	Votes	%
Republican	Mary Fallin	108,936	60.38
Democratic	David Hunter	67,293	37.30
Independent	Matthew Horton Woodson	4,196	2.33
Total votes		180,425	100.00
Republican hold			

=== 2008 ===
Oklahoma's 5th congressional district election, 2008
Party	Candidate	Votes	%
Republican	Mary Fallin (incumbent)	171,925	65.89
Democratic	Steven L. Perry	88,996	34.11
Total votes		260,921	100.00
Republican hold			

=== 2010 ===
Oklahoma's 5th congressional district election, 2010
Party	Candidate	Votes	%
Republican	James Lankford	123,236	62.53
Democratic	Billy Coyle	68,074	34.53
Independent	Clark Duffe	3,067	1.56
Independent	Dave White	2,728	1.38
Total votes		197,105	100
Republican hold			

=== 2012 ===
Oklahoma's 5th congressional district, 2012
Party	Candidate	Votes	%
Republican	James Lankford (incumbent)	153,603	58.7
Democratic	Tom Guild	97,504	37.3
Modern Whig	Pat Martin	5,394	2.1
Libertarian	Robert T. Murphy	5,176	2.0
Total votes		261,677	100.0
Republican hold			

=== 2014 ===
Oklahoma's 5th congressional district, 2014
Party	Candidate	Votes	%
Republican	Steve Russell	95,632	60.1
Democratic	Al McAffrey	57,790	36.3
Independent	Robert T. Murphy	2,176	1.4
Independent	Tom Boggs	2,065	1.3
Independent	Buddy Ray	1,470	0.9
Total votes		159,133	100.0
Republican hold			

=== 2016 ===
Oklahoma's 5th congressional district, 2016
Party	Candidate	Votes	%
Republican	Steve Russell (incumbent)	160,184	57.1
Democratic	Al McAffrey	103,273	36.8
Libertarian	Zachary Knight	17,113	6.1
Total votes		280,570	100.0
Republican hold			

=== 2018 ===
Oklahoma's 5th congressional district, 2018
Party	Candidate	Votes	%
Democratic	Kendra Horn	121,149	50.7
Republican	Steve Russell (incumbent)	117,811	49.3
Total votes		238,960	100.0
Democratic gain from Republican			

=== 2020 ===
Oklahoma's 5th congressional district, 2020
Party	Candidate	Votes	%
Republican	Stephanie Bice	158,191	52.1
Democratic	Kendra Horn (incumbent)	145,658	47.9
Total votes		303,849	100.0
Republican gain from Democratic			

=== 2022 ===
Oklahoma's 5th congressional district, 2022
Party	Candidate	Votes	%
Republican	Stephanie Bice (incumbent)	152,699	59.0
Democratic	Joshua Harris-Till	96,799	37.4
Independent	David Frosch	9,328	3.6
Total votes		258,826	100.0
Republican hold			

=== 2024 ===
2024 Oklahoma's 5th congressional district election results
Party	Candidate	Votes	%
Republican	Stephanie Bice (incumbent)	207,636	60.69%
Democratic	Madison Horn	134,471	39.31%
Total votes		342,107	100%
Republican hold			

== See also ==
- Oklahoma's congressional districts
- List of United States congressional districts
