= Oklahoma's 4th congressional district =

U.S. House district for Oklahoma

Coordinates: 35°N 98°W

- Interactive map of district boundaries since January 3, 2023
- Representative: Tom Cole; R–Moore
- Distribution: 63.29% urban; 36.71% rural
- Population (2025): 823,338
- Median household income: $69,739
- Ethnicity: 64.0% White; 10.1% Hispanic; 9.5% Two or more races; 7.5% Black; 5.8% Native American; 2.4% Asian; 0.7% other
- Cook PVI: R+17

Oklahoma's 4th congressional district is located in south-central Oklahoma and covers (in whole or in part) a total of 14 counties. Its principal cities include Midwest City, Norman, Moore, Ada, Duncan, Lawton/Ft. Sill, and Ardmore. The district also includes much of southern Oklahoma City.

The district is currently represented by Republican Tom Cole.

== Geography ==
The district borders Texas along the Red River to the south. To the north, the district includes a very small square-shaped portion of south-central Oklahoma County (enough to capture the city of Midwest City) and then Cleveland, McClain, Grady, Garvin, Murray, Pontotoc, Comanche, Tillman, Cotton, Stephens, Jefferson, Carter, and Love counties.

== History ==
As with the rest of the state, the district gives GOP candidates wide margins - George W. Bush received 61 percent of the vote in 2000, 67% in 2004, and John McCain received 66% of the vote in 2008. Mitt Romney received 67% in 2012, and Donald Trump received 66% and 65% in 2016 and 2020, respectively. The district is 63 percent urban, 5 percent Latino, and 3.5 percent foreign-born.

== Recent election results from statewide races ==
Year	Office	Results
2008	President	McCain 65% - 35%
2012	President	Romney 66% - 34%
2016	President	Trump 65% - 29%
2016	Senate	Lankford 67% - 24%
2018	Governor	Stitt 53% - 44%
2018	Lt. Governor	Pinnell 60% - 36%
2018	Attorney General	Hunter 63% - 37%
2020	President	Trump 64% - 33%
2020	Senate	Inhofe 63% - 33%
2022	Senate (Reg.)	Lankford 63% - 33%
2022	Senate (Spec.)	Mullin 60% - 36%
2022	Governor	Stitt 54% - 43%
2022	Lt. Governor	Pinnell 63% - 33%
2022	Treasurer	Russ 64% - 32%
2024	President	Trump 66% - 33%

== Composition ==
For the 118th and successive Congresses (based on redistricting following the 2020 census), the district contains all or portions of the following counties and communities:

Carter County (9)

All 9 communities

Cleveland County (8)

All 8 communities

Comanche County (14)

All 14 communities

Cotton County (4)

All 4 communities

Garvin County (11)

All 11 communities

Grady County (13)

All 13 communities

Jefferson County (8)

All 8 communities

Love County (3)

All 3 communities

McClain County (11)

All 11 communities

Murray County (4)

All 4 communities

Oklahoma County (4)

Del City, Midwest City (part; also 5th), Oklahoma City (part; also 3rd and 5th; shared with Canadian, Cleveland, and Pottawatomie counties)

Pontotoc County (11)

All 11 communities

Stephens County (10)

All 10 communities

Tillman County (8)

All 8 communities

== List of members representing the district ==
Name	Party	Years	Cong ress	Electoral history	Location
District established November 16, 1907
Charles D. Carter (Ardmore)	Democratic	November 16, 1907 – March 3, 1915	60th 61st 62nd 63rd	Elected in 1907. Re-elected in 1908. Re-elected in 1910. Re-elected in 1912. Redistricted to the 3rd district.	
William H. Murray (Tishomingo)	Democratic	March 4, 1915 – March 3, 1917	64th	Redistricted from the at-large district and re-elected in 1914. Lost renomination.	
Tom D. McKeown (Ada)	Democratic	March 4, 1917 – March 3, 1921	65th 66th	Elected in 1916. Re-elected in 1918. Lost re-election.	
Joseph C. Pringey (Chandler)	Republican	March 4, 1921 – March 3, 1923	67th	Elected in 1920. Lost re-election.	
Tom D. McKeown (Ada)	Democratic	March 4, 1923 – January 3, 1935	68th 69th 70th 71st 72nd 73rd	Again elected in 1922. Re-elected in 1924. Re-elected in 1926. Re-elected in 1928. Re-elected in 1930. Re-elected in 1932. Lost renomination.	
Percy Lee Gassaway (Coalgate)	Democratic	January 3, 1935 – January 3, 1937	74th	Elected in 1934. Lost renomination.	
Lyle Boren (Seminole)	Democratic	January 3, 1937 – January 3, 1947	75th 76th 77th 78th 79th	Elected in 1936. Re-elected in 1938. Re-elected in 1940. Re-elected in 1942. Re-elected in 1944. Lost renomination.	
Glen D. Johnson (Okemah)	Democratic	January 3, 1947 – January 3, 1949	80th	Elected in 1946. Retired to run for U.S. Senator.	
Tom Steed (Shawnee)	Democratic	January 3, 1949 – January 3, 1981	81st 82nd 83rd 84th 85th 86th 87th 88th 89th 90th 91st 92nd 93rd 94th 95th 96th	Elected in 1948. Re-elected in 1950. Re-elected in 1952. Re-elected in 1954. Re-elected in 1956. Re-elected in 1958. Re-elected in 1960. Re-elected in 1962. Re-elected in 1964. Re-elected in 1966. Re-elected in 1968. Re-elected in 1970. Re-elected in 1972. Re-elected in 1974. Re-elected in 1976. Re-elected in 1978. Retired.	
Dave McCurdy (Norman)	Democratic	January 3, 1981 – January 3, 1995	97th 98th 99th 100th 101st 102nd 103rd	Elected in 1980. Re-elected in 1982. Re-elected in 1984. Re-elected in 1986. Re-elected in 1988. Re-elected in 1990. Re-elected in 1992. Retired to run for U.S. Senator.	
J. C. Watts (Norman)	Republican	January 3, 1995 – January 3, 2003	104th 105th 106th 107th	Elected in 1994. Re-elected in 1996. Re-elected in 1998. Re-elected in 2000. Retired.	
Tom Cole (Moore)	Republican	January 3, 2003 – present	108th 109th 110th 111th 112th 113th 114th 115th 116th 117th 118th 119th	Elected in 2002. Re-elected in 2004. Re-elected in 2006. Re-elected in 2008. Re-elected in 2010. Re-elected in 2012. Re-elected in 2014. Re-elected in 2016. Re-elected in 2018. Re-elected in 2020. Re-elected in 2022. Re-elected in 2024. Re-elected in 2026.	2003–2013
Tom Cole (Moore)	Republican	January 3, 2003 – present	108th 109th 110th 111th 112th 113th 114th 115th 116th 117th 118th 119th	Elected in 2002. Re-elected in 2004. Re-elected in 2006. Re-elected in 2008. Re-elected in 2010. Re-elected in 2012. Re-elected in 2014. Re-elected in 2016. Re-elected in 2018. Re-elected in 2020. Re-elected in 2022. Re-elected in 2024. Re-elected in 2026.	2013–2023
Tom Cole (Moore)	Republican	January 3, 2003 – present	108th 109th 110th 111th 112th 113th 114th 115th 116th 117th 118th 119th	Elected in 2002. Re-elected in 2004. Re-elected in 2006. Re-elected in 2008. Re-elected in 2010. Re-elected in 2012. Re-elected in 2014. Re-elected in 2016. Re-elected in 2018. Re-elected in 2020. Re-elected in 2022. Re-elected in 2024. Re-elected in 2026.	2023–present

== Recent electoral history ==
Oklahoma's 4th congressional district: Results 1994 – 2022
Year	Democratic	Votes	Pct	Republican	Votes	Pct	3rd Party	Party	Votes	Pct	4th Party	Party	Votes	Pct
1994	David Perryman	67,237	43%	√ J. C. Watts, Jr.	80,251	52%	Bill Tiffee	Independent	7,913	5%				
1996	Ed Crocker	73,950	40%	√ J. C. Watts Jr.	106,923	58%	Robert Murphy	Libertarian	4,500	2%				
1998	Ben Odom	52,107	38%	√ J. C. Watts Jr.	83,272	62%								
2000	Larry Weatherford	54,808	31%	√ J. C. Watts Jr.	114,000	65%	Susan Ducey	Reform	4,897	3%	Keith B. Johnson	Libertarian	1,979	1%
2002	Darryl Roberts	91,322	46.17%	√ Tom Cole	106,452	53.83%								
2004	(no candidate)			√ Tom Cole	198,985	77.77%	Charlene K. Bradshaw	Independent	56,869	22.23%				
2006	Hal Spake	64,775	35.39%	√ Tom Cole	118,266	64.61%								
2008	Blake Cummings	79,674	29.21%	√ Tom Cole	180,080	66.02%	David E. Joyce	Independent	13,027	4.78%				
2010*	(no candidate)			√ Tom Cole	32,589	77.26%	RJ Harris	Republican	9,593	22.74%				
2012	Donna Marie Bebo	71,155	27.60%	√ Tom Cole	176,561	67.89%	RJ Harris	Independent	11,725	4.51%				
2014	Bert Smith	40,998	24.66%	√ Tom Cole	117,721	70.80%	Dennis B. Johnson	Independent	7,549	4.54%				
2016	Christina Owen	76,412	26.10%	√ Tom Cole	204,143	69.60%	Sevier White	Libertarian	12,574	4.30%				
2018	Mary Brannon	78,088	33.0%	√ Tom Cole	149,227	63.10%	Ruby Peters	Independent	9,323	3.90%				
2020	Mary Brannon	90,459	28.80%	√ Tom Cole	213,096	67.80%	Bob White	Libertarian	10,803	3.40%				
2022	Mary Brannon	74,667	33.25%	√ Tom Cole	149,879	66.75%								
2024	Mary Brannon	86,641	28.267%	√ Tom Cole	199,962	65.25%	James Stacy	Independent	19,870	6.48%				

- In 2010, no Democrat or independent candidate filed to run in the district. The results printed here are from the Republican primary, where the election was decided.

== See also ==
- Oklahoma's congressional districts
- List of United States congressional districts
