= L. M. Gensman =

American politician (1878-1954)

Lorraine Michael Gensman
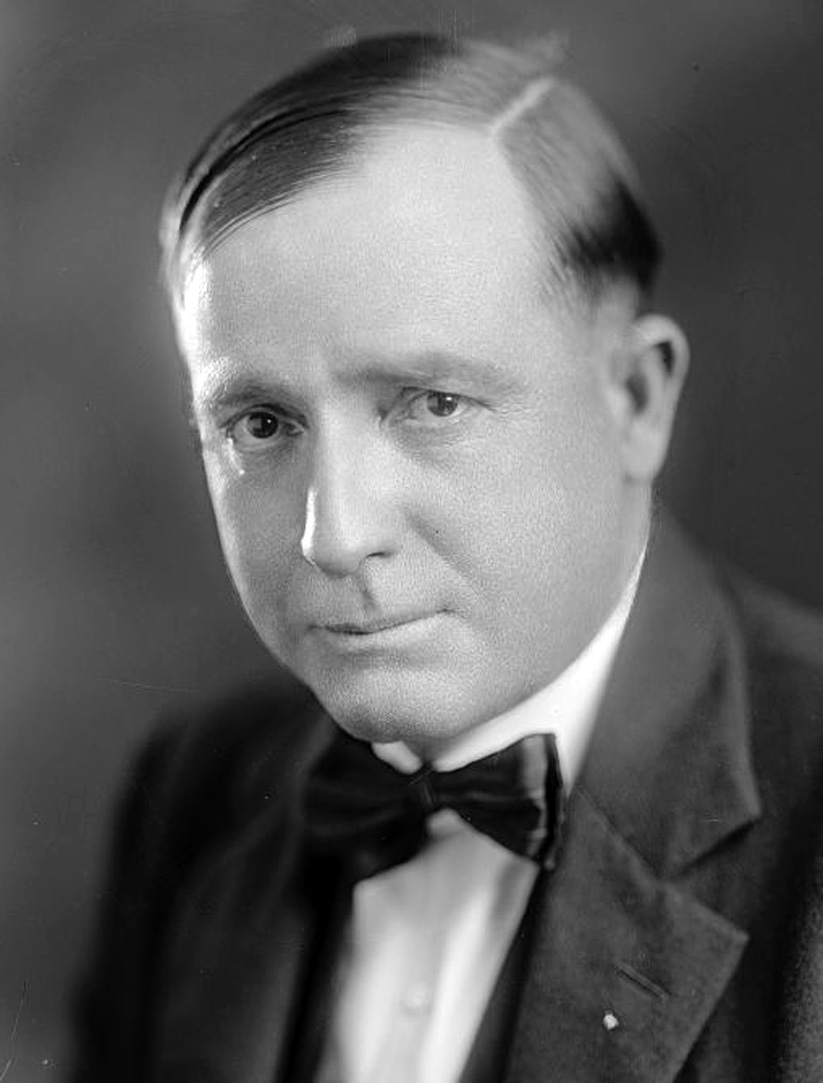

Member of the U.S. House of Representatives from Oklahoma's 6th district
- In office March 4, 1921 – March 4, 1923
- Preceded by: Scott Ferris
- Succeeded by: Elmer Thomas

Personal details
- Born: August 26, 1878 Wichita, Kansas
- Died: May 27, 1954 (aged 75) Lawton, Oklahoma
- Citizenship: United States
- Party: Republican
- Spouse: Lucia Van Cleef Gensman
- Education: Kansas State Normal School; University of Kansas School of Law
- Profession: Principal; Attorney politician oilman

Lorraine Michael Gensman (August 26, 1878 – May 27, 1954) was a U.S. representative from Oklahoma.

== Biography ==
Born on a farm near Wichita, Kansas, on August 26, 1878, Gensman was the son of Nicholas and Kansas Osborne Gensman. He attended the public schools, the Garden Plains Grade School, Wichita Commercial College, Lewis Academy, and the Kansas State Normal School at Emporia. He was Principal of the Andale, Kansas schools in 1896 and 1897. He graduated from the University of Kansas School of Law at Lawrence, Kansas in 1901, and was admitted to the bar the same year. He married fellow University of Kansas graduate Lucia Van Cleef on April 6, 1904.

== Career ==
Gensman began practice in Lawrence, Kansas; then moved to Lawton, Oklahoma in 1901, resuming his practice there. He served as Referee in Bankruptcy from 1902 to 1907. He served as prosecuting attorney of Comanche County in 1918 and 1919.

Elected as a Republican to the 67th Congress, Gensman served from March 4, 1921 to March 4, 1923. He was an unsuccessful candidate for reelection in 1922 to the 68th Congress and for election in 1936 to the 75th Congress. He served as delegate to the Republican National Convention in 1924. He engaged in the oil business, and resumed the practice of law until his retirement in 1953.

== Death ==
Gensman died in Lawton, Comanche County, Oklahoma, on May 27, 1954 (age 75 years, 274 days). He is interred at Highland Cemetery, Lawton, Oklahoma.

U.S. House of Representatives
Preceded by Scott Ferris	Member of the U.S. House of Representatives from Oklahoma's 6th congressional district 1921–1923	Succeeded by Elmer Thomas
