= Paul Stewart (politician) =

American politician

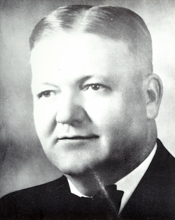

Member of the U.S. House of Representatives from Oklahoma's 3rd district
- In office January 3, 1943 – January 3, 1947
- Preceded by: Wilburn Cartwright
- Succeeded by: Carl Albert

Member of the Oklahoma Senate
- In office 1926–1942

Member of the Oklahoma House of Representatives
- In office 1922–1926

Personal details
- Born: February 27, 1892 Clarksville, Arkansas, United States
- Died: November 13, 1950 (aged 58) Antlers, Oklahoma
- Resting place: City Cemetery in Antlers, OK
- Party: Democratic
- Spouses: Ozella Alberta Keen Stewart; Irene Almond Smith Stewart
- Children: Elma Stewart; Martha Stewart
- Profession: mail carrier, merchant, farmer/rancher, Attorney, politician, postmaster, publisher/editor

Paul Stewart (February 27, 1892 – November 13, 1950) was an American lawyer, newspaperman, and politician who served two terms as a U.S. representative from Oklahoma from 1943 to 1947.

== Early life ==
Born in Clarksville, Arkansas, Stewart moved with his parents, Charles Jackson and Mary Ellen Overbey Stewart, to Poteau, Indian Territory, in 1894. They moved to Red River County, Choctaw Nation, Indian Territory (now a part of McCurtain County, Oklahoma) in 1897.

=== Private life ===
On August 7, 1912, Stewart married Berta Keen, daughter of Young and Eva Byrum Keen. The couple had two daughters, Elma and Martha. After they divorced, he remarried on June 9, 1938, to Irene Almond Smith, and they had no children.

== Early career ==
At age ten, Stewart became a rural mail carrier, and at thirteen, he entered the mercantile business at Spencerville, Indian Territory. He was educated at home before attending school at age fourteen, and he finished four years later. In 1910, he moved his business to Haworth, Oklahoma, where he continued its operation until 1919.

Admitted to the bar in 1915, Stewart commenced the practice of law as well as becoming Postmaster at Haworth from 1914 to 1922. He served in the Oklahoma State house of representatives from 1922 to 1926. He moved to Antlers, Oklahoma, in 1929, where he was the editor, owner, and publisher of the Antlers (Oklahoma) American, a weekly newspaper, from 1929 to 1950.

== Political career ==
He served as member of the State senate 1926-1942, serving as Democratic floor leader in 1929 and 1930 and as president pro tempore in 1933 and 1934. He was Acting Governor in 1933 and engaged in cattle raising, farming, and the hotel business.

=== Congress ===
Elected as a Democrat to the Seventy-eighth and Seventy-ninth Congresses, Stewart served from January 3, 1943, to January 3, 1947. He was not a candidate for renomination in 1946 to the Eightieth Congress.

== Later career and death ==
resumed newspaper publishing, ranching, and managing hotel business until his death in Antlers, Oklahoma, on November 13, 1950, from a stroke after being overcome by smoke while fighting a grass fire. He is interred at City Cemetery.

U.S. House of Representatives
Preceded by Wilburn Cartwright	Member of the U.S. House of Representatives from Oklahoma's 3rd congressional district 1943-1947	Succeeded by Carl Albert
