= Neil E. McNeil =

American judge

- Born: November 10, 1875; Onawa, Iowa
- Died: Missing; Missing
- Other names: Neil E. McNeill
- Occupations: Attorney, Supreme Court justice
- Years active: 1905-?
- Known for: Associate Justice of Oklahoma Supreme Court (1917-1924)

Neil E. McNeil (born 1875) was Associate Justice of Oklahoma Supreme Court in the United States. He was born November 10, 1875, in Onawa, Iowa. No other information has been found about his early life, except that he graduated from Duke University with an LL.B. in 1899. Armed with his law degree, he reportedly came to Oklahoma in 1904, where he settled at first at Jennings, Oklahoma, and served as mayor from 1905 until 1907. After moving to Pawnee, Oklahoma, in 1907, he was successively Pawnee County, Oklahoma judge until 1911, then District judge until 1919. After 1919, he moved to Oklahoma City, where he lived from 1919 to 1925, while serving on the Oklahoma Supreme Court. After that, he moved to Tulsa, where he worked in a private law practice for the rest of his career.

Neil E. McNeil was appointed to the Oklahoma Supreme Court in 1917 and served as associate justice until 1924. He represented Judicial District 6. His brother, E. R. McNeil also served as an associate justice on the Oklahoma Supreme Court.
