= 1920 United States Senate election in Oklahoma =

- November 2, 1920
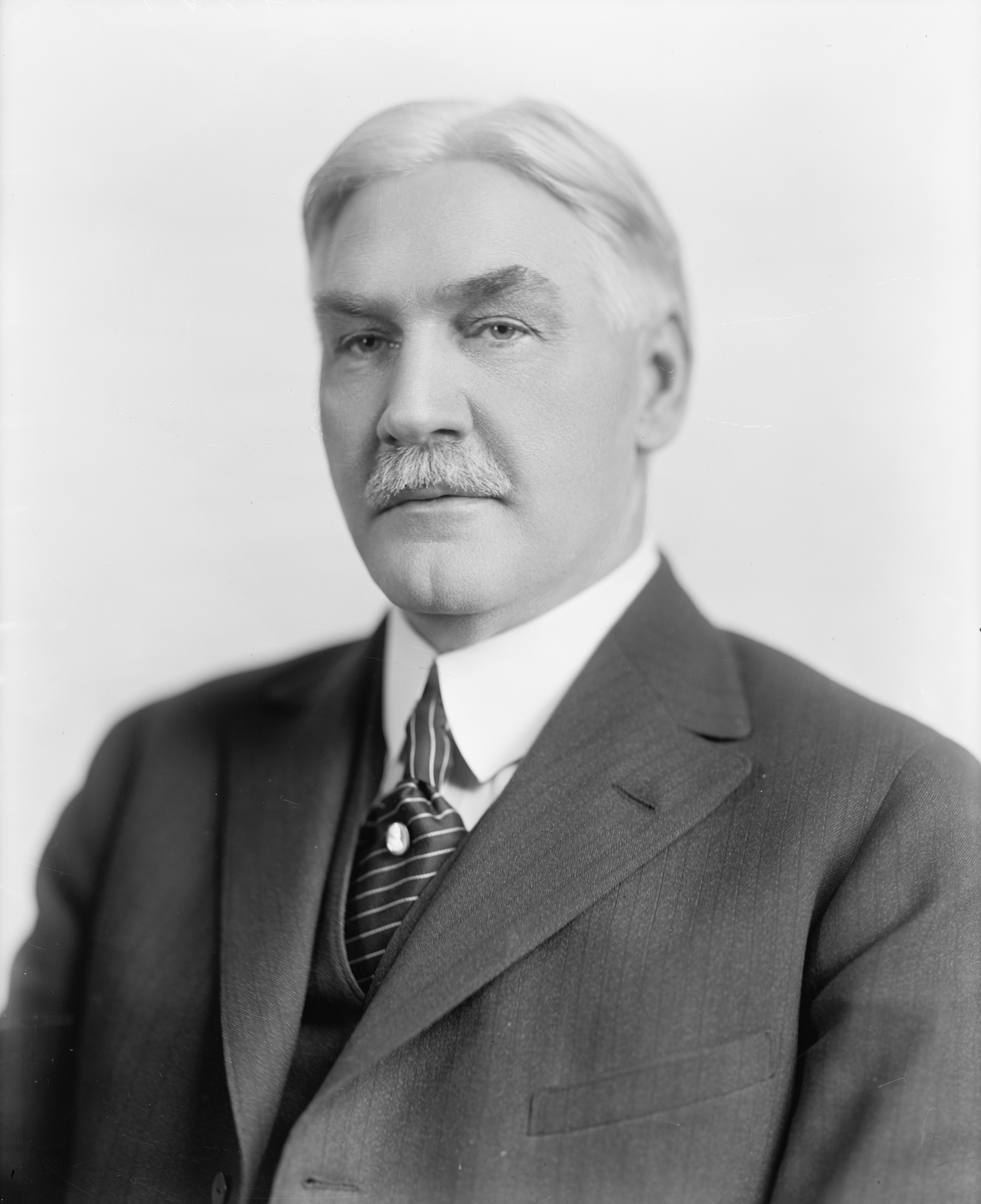

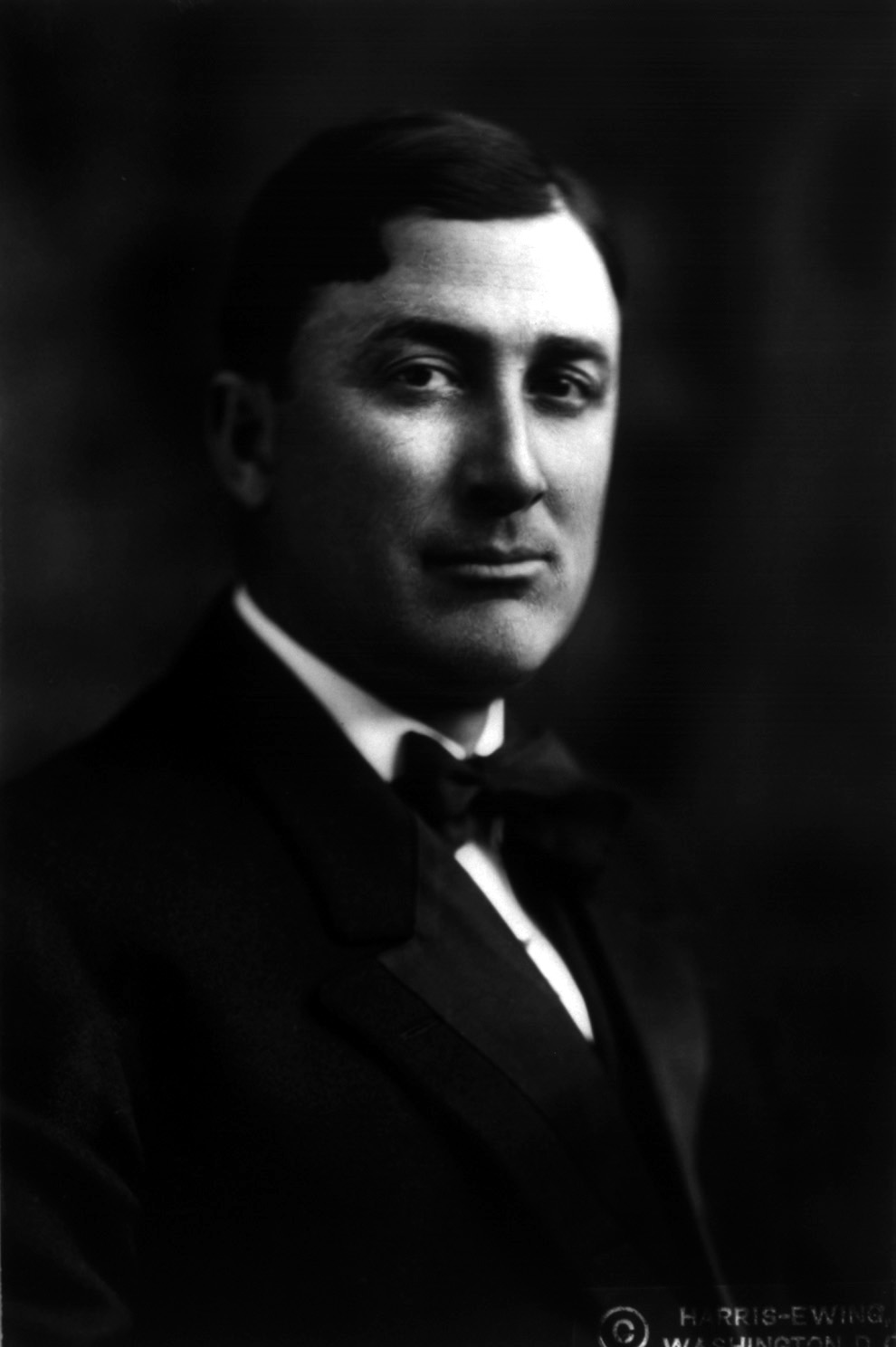
Nominee	John W. Harreld	Scott Ferris
Party	Republican	Democratic
Popular vote	247,719	217,783
Percentage	50.64%	44.52%
- County results Harreld: 40–50% 50–60% 60–70% Ferris: 40–50% 50–60% 60–70%
U.S. senator before election
Thomas Gore
Democratic
Elected U.S. Senator
John W. Harreld
Republican

The 1920 United States Senate election in Oklahoma took place on November 2, 1920. Incumbent Democratic Senator Thomas Gore ran for re-election to a third term. However, he was defeated in the Democratic primary by Congressman Scott Ferris. In the general election, Ferris faced fellow Congressman John W. Harreld, the Republican nominee. Likely helped by Republican presidential nominee Warren G. Harding's victory in Oklahoma over Democratic nominee James M. Cox, Harreld defeated Ferris by a similar margin to Harding's.

== Democratic primary ==
=== Candidates ===
- Scott Ferris, U.S. Congressman from Oklahoma's 6th congressional district
- Thomas Gore, incumbent U.S. Senator

=== Results ===
Democratic primary
Party	Candidate	Votes	%
Democratic	Scott Ferris	106,454	57.02%
Democratic	Thomas Gore (inc.)	80,243	42.98%
Total votes		186,697	100.00%

== Republican primary ==
=== Candidates ===
- John W. Harreld, U.S. Congressman from Oklahoma's 5th congressional district
- James B. Cullison, Oklahoma 21st District Court Judge
- Albert A. Small, Tulsa businessman
- Ernest E. Blake, former Assistant Oklahoma City Attorney
- Edward M. Clark, former State Senator from Payne County and Pawnee County
- Dynamite Ed Perry
- C. Lincoln McGuire
- Ben Thompson, Sapulpa attorney
- Cash M. Cade
- N. D. Welty
- Henry Powers, Oklahoma City police officer
- Warren D. Lindsey
- William Tecumseh Clark
- Summer T. Bisbe

=== Results ===
Republican primary
Party	Candidate	Votes	%
Republican	John W. Harreld	17,423	25.22%
Republican	James B. Cullison	7,175	10.38%
Republican	Albert A. Small	6,807	9.85%
Republican	Ernest E. Blake	6,025	8.72%
Republican	E. M. Clark	5,119	7.41%
Republican	Dynamite Ed Perry	4,850	7.02%
Republican	C. Lincoln McGuire	4,660	6.74%
Republican	Ben Thompson	4,007	5.80%
Republican	Cash M. Cade	3,193	4.62%
Republican	N. D. Welty	2,946	4.26%
Republican	Henry Powers	2,045	2.96%
Republican	Warren D. Lindsey	1,892	2.74%
Republican	William Tecumseh Clark	1,495	2.16%
Republican	Summer T. Bisbe	1,454	2.10%
Total votes		69,091	100.00%

== Socialist Primary ==
=== Candidates ===
- A. A. Bagwell, former instructor at Henry Kendall College

=== Results ===
Socialist primary
Party	Candidate	Votes	%
Socialist	A. A. Bagwell	4,245	100.00%
Total votes		4,245	100.00%

== General election ==
=== Results ===
1920 United States Senate election in Oklahoma
Party	Candidate	Votes	%	±%
Republican	John W. Harreld	247,719	50.64%	+21.20%
Democratic	Scott Ferris	217,783	44.52%	−3.46%
Socialist	A. A. Bagwell	23,664	4.84%	−16.14%
Majority		29,936	6.12%	−12.42%
Turnout		489,166		
Republican gain from Democratic				
