= Bayard T. Hainer =

American judge (1860–1933)

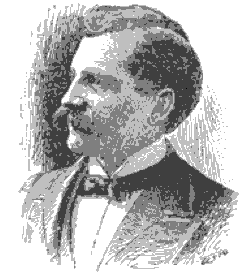
- Born: Bayard Taylor Hainer; May 31, 1860; Columbia, Missouri, US
- Died: July 10, 1933 (aged 73); Oklahoma City, Oklahoma, US
- Education: University of Michigan
- Occupations: Attorney, Justice of the Oklahoma Territory Supreme Court

Bayard Taylor Hainer (1860–1933) was a justice of the Territorial Oklahoma Supreme Court in 1898.

== Biography ==
Bayard Taylor Hainer was born in Columbia, Missouri on May 31, 1860. His father was Ignace Hainer (Note: Ignace was a professor of modern languages at the University of Missouri.) and his mother was Adelaide (Barthos) Hainer. Bayard's family moved to Iowa when the Civil War broke out. Bayard earned a B.S. from Iowa State College in 1884 (no major identified), and a Bachelor of Laws from University of Michigan in 1887. Admitted to the bar in Michigan in the same year, he moved to Larned, Kansas to start practicing law.

Settling in Guthrie, immediately after the Land Run of 1889, Hainer was appointed as Guthrie's city councillor, a position he held until 1898. In that year, the President of the United States appointed him as a justice of the Oklahoma Territory Supreme Court on February 16, 1898, succeeding Judge Bierer.

He was a lawyer, journalist and author, (Note: He wrote one book, The Modern Law of Municipal Securities, in 1898.)as well as active in Republican Party politics. On October 6, 1891, he married Florence Weatherby, who was the daughter of Mrs. Mary Weatherby of Des Moines, Iowa. (Note: Bayard and Florence had one son, Bayard Taylor Hainer, Jr. (1900–1966).)

On December 11, 1901, the President reappointed Hainer to another term on the court, as well as Chief Justice John H. Burford and Associate Justice B. H. Burwell. On June 4, 1902, the Fourth Supreme Court District was created to include Noble, Kay and Pawnee Counties, with the district court at Pawhuska, Osage Nation. Judge Hainer was assigned to this District. He was still on the Territorial Court on November 16, 1907, when the Oklahoma Territorial government expired and was immediately replaced by the state of Oklahoma.

He was an unsuccessful candidate for the U. S. House of Representatives from the Oklahoma 5th District in 1920. The following year he became chief counsel for packers and stockyards administration, Washington, D.C, He was appointed chief counsel for Federal Trade Commission 1925-27. He returned to Oklahoma City, where he died July 10, 1933. He was buried in Fairlawn Cemetery in Oklahoma City.
