= Charles E. Creager =

American politician

Charles Edward Creager
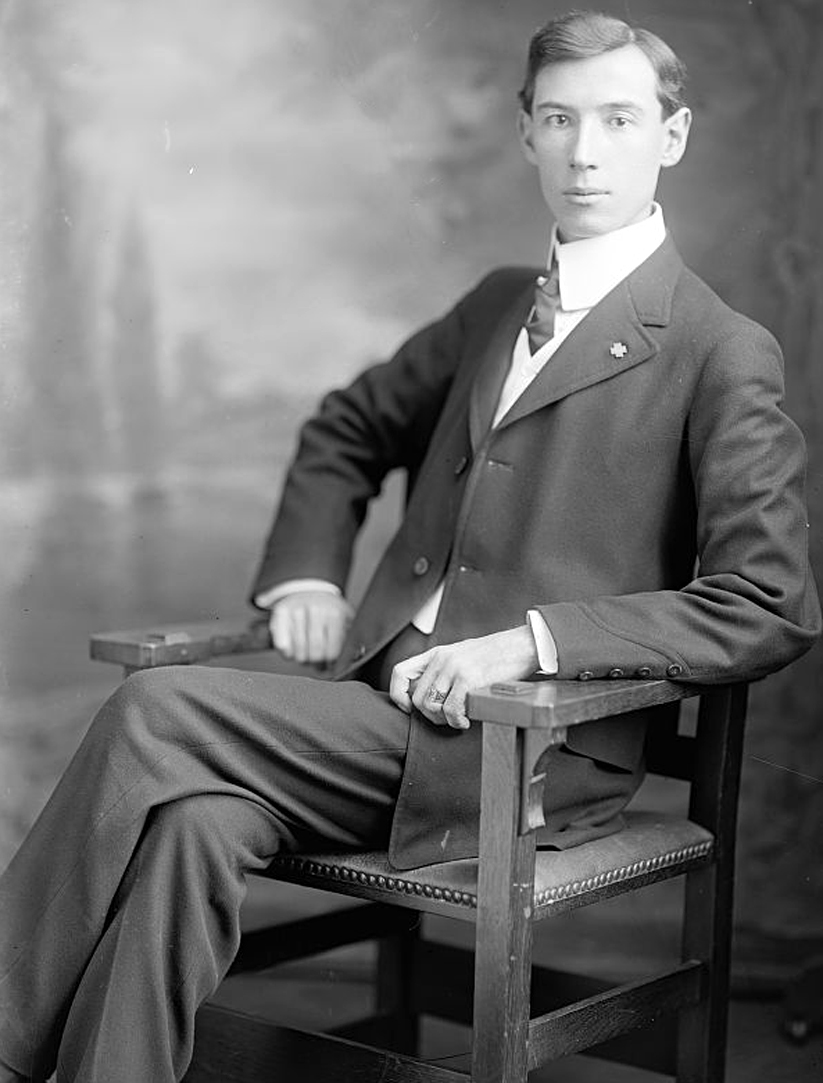

Member of the U.S. House of Representatives from Oklahoma's 3rd district
- In office March 4, 1909 – March 3, 1911
- Preceded by: James S. Davenport
- Succeeded by: James S. Davenport

Personal details
- Born: April 28, 1873 Montgomery County, Ohio
- Died: January 11, 1964 (aged 90) Muskogee, Oklahoma
- Citizenship: United States
- Party: Republican
- Spouse: Elizabeth Fleenor Creager
- Children: Baron Creager; Margaret Creager
- Education: Northern Indiana University
- Profession: Editor; Publisher; politician

Military service
- Allegiance: United States of America
- Branch/service: United States Army
- Rank: sergeant major
- Unit: Fourth Ohio Volunteer Infantry
- Battles/wars: Spanish–American War

Charles Edward Creager (April 28, 1873 – January 11, 1964) was an American newspaper publisher and editor and a U.S. Representative from Oklahoma.

== Biography ==
Born in Montgomery County, Ohio near Dayton, Creager was the son of William Otterbein and Belle Basore Creager. He attended Ohio public schools and graduated from Northern Indiana University. He married Elizabeth Fleenor, and they had a son, Baron, and a daughter, Margaret. He enlisted as a sergeant major in the Fourth Ohio Volunteer Infantry during the Spanish–American War and served under General Nelson A. Miles in the Puerto Rican campaign.

== Career ==
Creager also engaged in the newspaper business, being the city editor of the Columbus Press-Post from 1899 to 1901 and editor of the Daily Leader in Marietta, Ohio, from 1902 to 1904. He moved to Muskogee, Indian Territory (now Oklahoma) in November 1904 and engaged in the newspaper business once more, later becoming publisher and editor of several Oklahoma newspapers.

Elected as a Republican to the Sixty-first Congress, Creager served from March 4, 1909, to March 3, 1911. An unsuccessful candidate for reelection to the Sixty-second Congress in 1910, he was employed in the United States Indian Service and later engaged in oil production until 1934, when he retired.

== Civic affairs ==
Creager was active in Freemasonry; elected to serve the organization in state leadership positions of Most Illustrious Grand Master of Cryptic Masons of Oklahoma (1920-1921) and Most Excellent Grand High Priest of the Grand Chapter of Royal Arch Masons of Oklahoma (1925-1926). He published A History of the Cryptic Rite Freemasonry in Oklahoma in 1925 and was a perpetual member of Muskogee Masonic Lodge No. 28 Ancient Free & Accepted Masons of Oklahoma.

== Death ==
Creager died, of emphysema, at the Muskogee Veterans Administration Hospital on January 11, 1964 (age 90 years, 258 days). He is interred at Greenhill Cemetery in Muskogee, Muskogee County, Oklahoma.

U.S. House of Representatives
Preceded by James S. Davenport	Member of the U.S. House of Representatives from Oklahoma's 3rd congressional district 1909–1911	Succeeded by James S. Davenport
