= Bird S. McGuire =

American politician

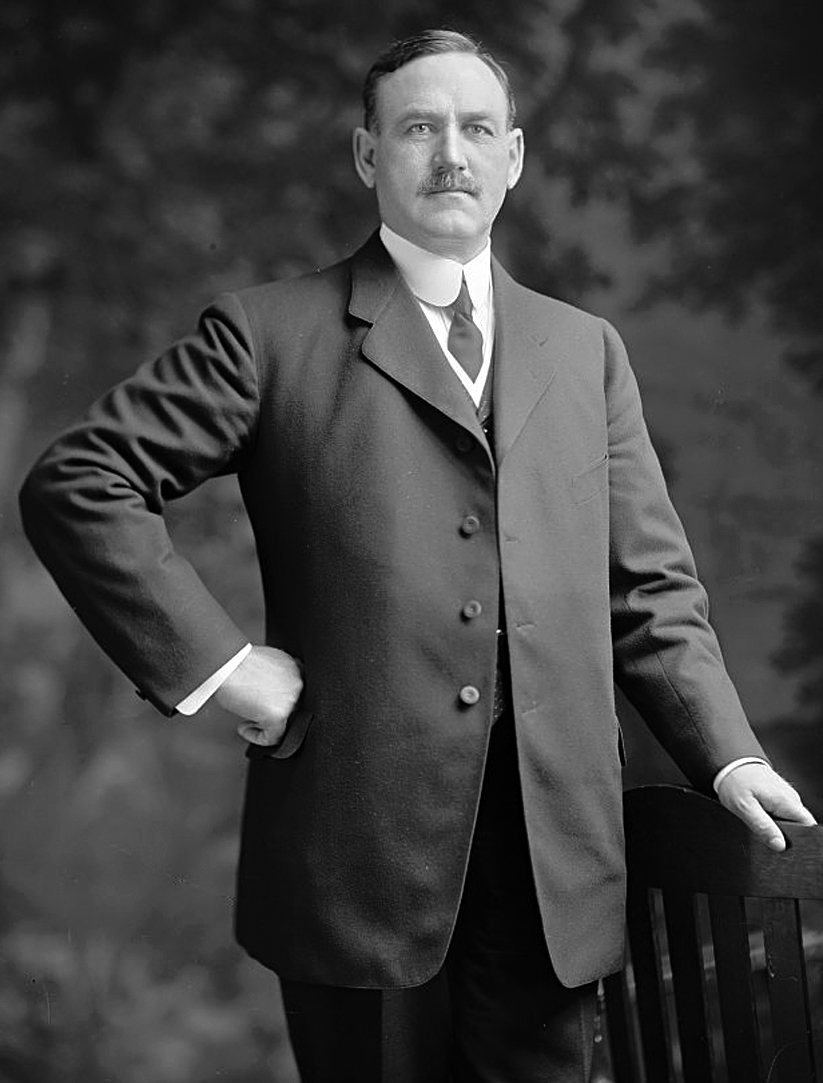

Member of the U.S. House of Representatives from Oklahoma's 1st district
- In office November 16, 1907 – March 3, 1915
- Succeeded by: James S. Davenport

Delegate to the U.S. House of Representatives from Territory of Oklahoma's at-large district
- In office March 4, 1903 – March 3, 1907
- Preceded by: Dennis T. Flynn
- Succeeded by: statehood achieved

Personal details
- Born: Bird Segle McGuire; October 13, 1865 Belleville, Illinois, US
- Died: November 9, 1930 (aged 65) Tulsa, Oklahoma, US
- Party: Republican
- Spouse(s): Anna Marx (1894-1909); Ruby Ridgeway (1911-1920); Goldie Smith (1924-)
- Education: University of Kansas at Lawrence
- Profession: cattleman, teacher, lawyer, politician

Bird Segle McGuire (October 13, 1865 – November 9, 1930) was an American politician, a Delegate and the last U.S. Representative from Oklahoma Territory. After statehood, he was elected as an Oklahoma member of Congress, where he served four consecutive terms. He retired from politics in 1915. He was a cousin of William Neville.

== Early life ==
Born in Belleville, Illinois, McGuire moved to Randolph County, Missouri with his parents in 1867. He attended public school, and moved to Chautauqua County, Kansas, in the spring of 1881; and then to Indian Territory. He engaged in the cattle business, and attended the State Normal School at Emporia, Kansas.

== Career ==
McGuire taught for several terms, and later attended the law department of the University of Kansas at Lawrence. He was admitted to the bar in 1889 and commenced practice in Sedan, county seat of Chautauqua, Kansas. He registered as a Republican the first time he voted, and remained in that party for the rest of his life. He served as prosecuting attorney of Chautauqua County, Kansas from 1890 to 1894.

After moving to Pawnee in Indian Territory in 1894 he opened a law practice there. He was appointed assistant United States Attorney for Oklahoma Territory in 1897, in which capacity he served until after his nomination for Congress.

McGuire was recognized as the leader of one wing of the Oklahoma Republican Party and battled with the last territorial governor Frank Frantz over party leadership and patronage appointments. The infighting resulted in McGuire's being the only Republican elected to Congress from Oklahoma in 1907.

== Aiding Oklahoma's Bid for Statehood ==
Elected as a Republican a Delegate to the Fifty-eighth and Fifty-ninth Congresses, McGuire served from March 4, 1903, to March 3, 1907. As a Territorial representative he could not vote. However, he could participate in the debates. When Congress took up the issue of statehood for the twin territories, the Democrats were adamantly in favor of creating two states: Sequoyah for Indian Territory (the eastern part) and Oklahoma for the western part. Republicans favored a single state that would be called Oklahoma. Although Congress was closely divided, the Republican president Theodore Roosevelt was so opposed to the two-state solution, he promised to veto any legislation that came to his desk with that option. McGuire realized that if the Democrats got their way, then no state would be created in the foreseeable future. Historian Thoburn wrote that McGuire proved so capable in moving the Democrats to back down on their two-state position that Congress passed the Oklahoma Enabling Act which the President signed, even though grudgingly.

He was then elected as a Representative to the Sixtieth and to the three succeeding Congresses and served from November 16, 1907, when Oklahoma was admitted as a State into the Union, until March 3, 1915. He served as chairman of the Committee on Expenditures in the Department of the Interior (Sixty-first Congress). He was not a candidate for renomination in 1914 to the Sixty-fourth Congress.

He married Ruby Ridgeway of Kansas City, Missouri on June 2, 1911. When his term expired in 1915, he moved his residence from Pawnee to Tulsa, where he resumed his law practice until his death. McGuire also owned and operated a large ranch near Bartlesville, Oklahoma.

== Death ==
McGuire died in Tulsa, Tulsa County, Oklahoma, on November 9, 1930 (age 65 years, 27 days). He is interred at Memorial Park Cemetery, in Tulsa, Oklahoma.

U.S. House of Representatives
| Preceded by Dennis Thomas Flynn | Delegate to the U.S. House of Representatives from Oklahoma Territory's at-large congressional district March 4, 1903 – March 4, 1907 | Succeeded by None, statehood achieved |
| Preceded by None, statehood achieved | Member of the U.S. House of Representatives from Oklahoma's 1st congressional district November 16, 1907 – March 4, 1915 | Succeeded by James S. Davenport |
