= Scott Ferris =

American politician

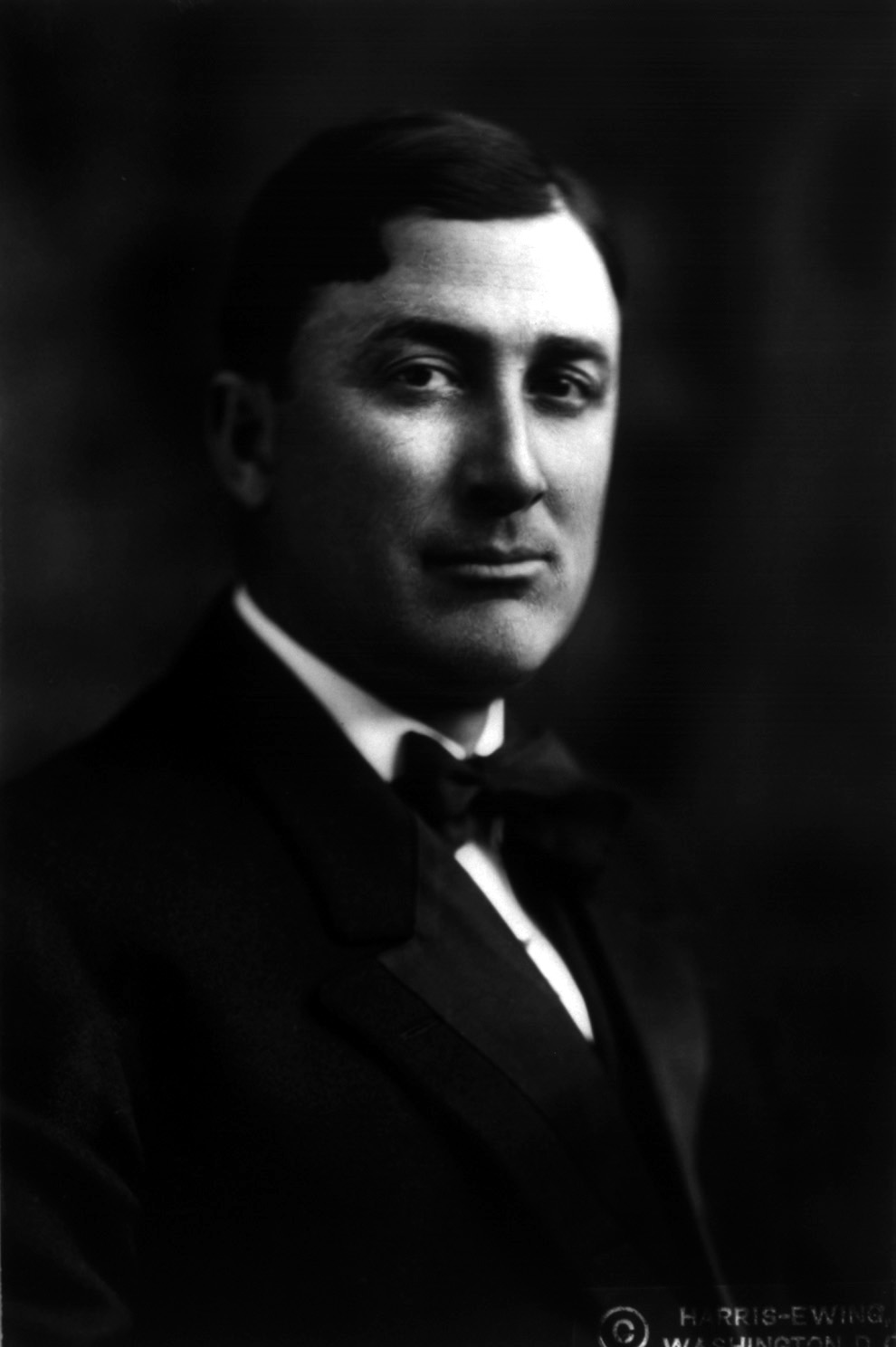

Member of the U.S. House of Representatives from Oklahoma
- In office November 16, 1907 – March 3, 1921
- Preceded by: District created
- Succeeded by: L.M. Gensman
- Constituency: 5th district (1907–1915); 6th district (1915–1921)

Member of the Oklahoma Territorial House from the 22nd district
- In office 1905 – November 16, 1907
- Preceded by: Joseph K. Tuttle
- Succeeded by: Position abolished

Personal details
- Born: November 3, 1877 Neosho, Missouri, United States
- Died: June 8, 1945 (aged 67) Oklahoma City, Oklahoma
- Party: Democratic Party
- Spouse: Grace Hubbert Ferris
- Education: Kansas City School of Law
- Profession: Attorney politician oilman farmer

Scott Ferris (November 3, 1877 – June 8, 1945) was a U.S. representative from Oklahoma.

== Early life ==
Ferris was born in Neosho, Missouri to Scott and Annie M. Ferris. He attended the public schools and was graduated from Newton County High School in 1897 and from the Kansas City School of Law in 1901. He was admitted to the bar in 1901 and commenced practice in Lawton, Oklahoma, the same year. On June 23, 1906, he married Grace Hubbert, the daughter of a prominent attorney, George Washington Hubbert.

== Career ==
Ferris served as member of the territorial Oklahoma House of Representatives in 1904 and 1905. Upon the admission of Oklahoma as a State into the Union, Ferris was elected as a Democrat to the 60th Congress. He was reelected to the 61st and to the six succeeding Congresses and served from November 16, 1907, until March 3, 1921. He served as chairman of the Committee on Public Lands (62nd through 65th Congresses). He did not seek renomination as a Representative, but was an unsuccessful candidate for Senator. He won the Democratic primary against incumbent Thomas P. Gore but was defeated in the general election by Republican John W. Harreld, receiving 45 percent of the vote.

In 1912 and in 1916 Ferris served as delegate to the Democratic National Conventions. He moved to New York City and engaged in the oil business from 1921 to 1924. Returning to Oklahoma in 1925, he served as Democratic National Committeeman from Oklahoma from 1924 to 1940. He resumed the practice of law; engaged in the oil business and in agricultural pursuits.

His wife, Grace Hubbert Ferris, died unexpectedly of a cerebral hemorrhage on March 9, 1944.

== Death ==
Ferris died in Oklahoma City, Oklahoma County, Okla., June 8, 1945 (age 67 years, 217 days). He is interred at Rose Hill Burial Park, Oklahoma City.

Party political offices
Preceded by Thomas Gore	Democratic nominee for U.S. Senator from Oklahoma (Class 3); 1920	Succeeded by Elmer Thomas
U.S. House of Representatives
Preceded by District created	Member of the U.S. House of Representatives from Oklahoma's 5th congressional district 1907–1915	Succeeded by Joseph Bryan Thompson
Preceded by District created	Member of the U.S. House of Representatives from Oklahoma's 6th congressional district 1915-1921	Succeeded by L.M. Gensman
