= James S. Davenport =

American politician and jurist

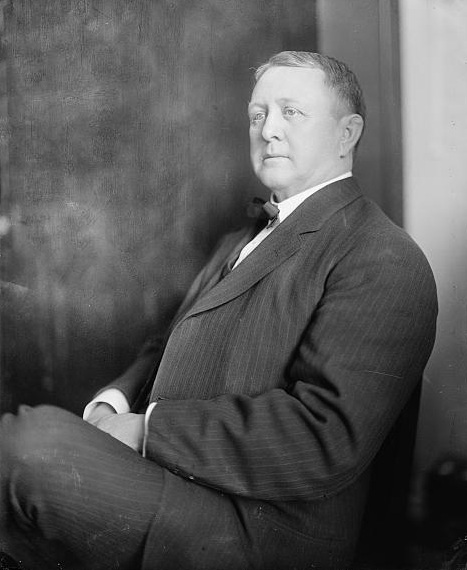

Member of the U.S. House of Representatives from Oklahoma
- In office November 16, 1907 – March 3, 1909
- Preceded by: District Created
- Succeeded by: Charles E. Creager
- Constituency: 3rd district
- In office March 4, 1911 – March 3, 1917
- Preceded by: Charles E. Creager
- Succeeded by: Thomas Alberter Chandler
- Constituency: 3rd district (1911–1915); 1st district (1915–1917)

Personal details
- Born: September 21, 1864 Gaylesville, Alabama
- Died: January 3, 1940 (aged 75) Oklahoma City, Oklahoma
- Party: Democratic

James Sanford Davenport (September 21, 1864 – January 3, 1940) was a U.S. representative from Oklahoma and a member of the Oklahoma Court of Criminal Appeals. He served on the congressional committee that created the first roads and highways committee in the U.S. House.

== Early life and career ==
Born on a farm near Gaylesville, Alabama, Davenport moved with his parents to Conway, Arkansas, in 1880. He attended the common schools, Vilona (Arkansas) High School, and Greenbrier (Arkansas) Academy. He studied law.

He was admitted to the bar of Faulkner County on February 14, 1890, and commenced practice in Conway. In October of that year, Davenport moved to Muskogee, Indian Territory (now Oklahoma), and in 1893 to Vinita, where he engaged in the practice of law.

== Political career ==
He served as member of the Territorial council 1897–1901, serving as speaker the last two years of his term. He was one of the attorneys for the Cherokee Nation from 1901–1907. He served as mayor of Vinita in 1903 and 1904.

Davenport was elected as a Democrat to the 60th Congress on September 17, 1907, and served from November 16, 1907, when Oklahoma was admitted as a State into the Union, until March 3, 1909. He was an unsuccessful candidate for reelection in 1908 to the 61st Congress.

Davenport was elected to the 62nd, 63rd, and 64th Congresses (March 4, 1911 – March 3, 1917). He was an unsuccessful candidate for reelection in 1916 to the 65th Congress. He resumed the practice of law in Vinita. He was elected judge of the Oklahoma Court of Criminal Appeals in November 1926.

== Death ==
He was reelected in 1932 and served until his death in Oklahoma City, Oklahoma, January 3, 1940. He was interred in Fairview Cemetery, Vinita, Oklahoma.

== Electoral history ==
1907 Oklahoma's 3rd congressional district election
Party	Candidate	Votes	%
Democratic	James S. Davenport	26,370	52.73
Republican	Frank C. Hubbard	23,643	47.27
Total votes		50,013	100.00
Democratic win (new seat)			

1908 Oklahoma's 3rd congressional district election
Party	Candidate	Votes	%
Republican	Charles E. Creager	24,952	48.30
Democratic	James S. Davenport (incumbent)	23,881	46.23
Socialist	Winston T. Banks	2,827	5.47
Total votes		51,660	100.00
Republican gain from Democratic			

U.S. House of Representatives
Preceded by District Created	Member of the U.S. House of Representatives from Oklahoma's 3rd congressional district 1907-1909	Succeeded by Charles E. Creager
Preceded by Charles E. Creager	Member of the U.S. House of Representatives from Oklahoma's 3rd congressional district 1911-1915	Succeeded by Charles D. Carter
Preceded by Bird Segle McGuire	Member of the U.S. House of Representatives from Oklahoma's 1st congressional district 1915-1917	Succeeded by Thomas Alberter Chandler
