= Charles D. Carter =

American politician (1868–1929)

Charles Carter
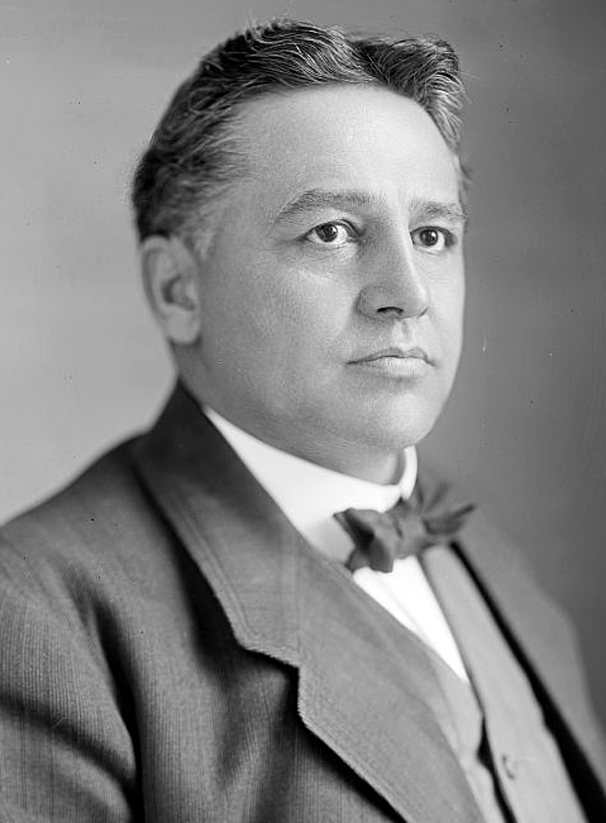
- Carter, 1905–1929

Member of the U.S. House of Representatives from Oklahoma
- In office November 16, 1907 – March 3, 1927
- Preceded by: Constituency established
- Succeeded by: Wilburn Cartwright
- Constituency: 4th district (1907–1915); 3rd district (1915–1927)

Personal details
- Born: Charles David Carter; August 16, 1868 Boggy Depot, Indian Territory, U.S. (now Oklahoma)
- Died: April 9, 1929 (aged 60) Ardmore, Oklahoma, U.S.
- Citizenship: American; Chickasaw Nation
- Party: Democratic
- Spouse(s): Ada Wilson; Cecile Whittington Jones
- Children: 4

Charles David Carter (August 16, 1868 – April 9, 1929) was an American politician who served in the United States House of Representatives from Oklahoma's 4th and 3rd congressional districts from 1907 to 1927. He was appointed by President William McKinley as Mining Trustee for Indian Territory, which he served as from 1900 to 1904.

Carter was active in the Chickasaw Nation and served as its auditor, on the Chickasaw Council, and as superintendent of Chickasaw Schools.

== Early life ==
Charles David Carter was born near Boggy Depot, Choctaw Nation, Indian Territory (now Oklahoma), Carter moved with his father to Mill Creek, a stage stand on the western frontier of the Chickasaw Nation, in April 1876. Carter was of Chickasaw and Cherokee descent. He attended the Indian day schools and Chickasaw Manual Training Academy at Tishomingo.

Carter was employed on a ranch from 1887 to 1889 and in a mercantile establishment in Ardmore, Oklahoma, from 1889 to 1892. He married Ada Gertrude Wilson on December 29, 1891 and they had four children, Stella LeFlore, Italy Cecil, Julia Josephine, and Benjamin Wisnor Carter, Jr. After Ada's death on January 30, 1901, he married Cecile Whittington Jones on January 8, 1911.

== Public service ==
Carter served as auditor of public accounts of the Chickasaw Nation from 1892 to 1894, a member of the Chickasaw Council in 1895, then superintendent of schools of the Chickasaw Nation in 1897. He was appointed mining trustee of Indian Territory by President William McKinley in November 1900 and served four years.

Carter was Secretary of the first Democratic executive committee of the proposed State of Oklahoma from June to December 1906. Upon the admission of Oklahoma as a state into the Union, he was elected as a Democrat to the sixtieth and to the nine succeeding Congresses, serving from November 16, 1907, to March 4, 1927.

Carter served as chairman of the Committee on Indian Affairs (Sixty-fifth Congress). He was an unsuccessful candidate for renomination in 1926. He was appointed to the State Highway Commission, serving 1927-1929.

== Death ==
Carter died in Ardmore, Carter County, Oklahoma, on April 9, 1929. He is interred at Rose Hill Cemetery in Ardmore.

== Electoral history ==
1907 Oklahoma's 4th congressional district election{
Party	Candidate	Votes	%
Democratic	Charles D. Carter	29,782	62.57
Republican	Loren G. Disney	15,752	33.09
Socialist	J. T. Cumbie	2,065	4.34
Total votes		47,599	100.00
Democratic win (new seat)			

1908 Oklahoma's 4th congressional district election
Party	Candidate	Votes	%
Democratic	Charles D. Carter (incumbent)	22,047	50.63
Republican	Benjamin F. Hackett	15,727	36.12
Socialist	M. C. Carter	5,769	13.25
Total votes		43,543	100.00
Democratic hold			

1910 Democratic primary results
Party	Candidate	Votes	%
Democratic	Charles D. Carter (incumbent)	18,732	80.20%
Democratic	Ben Bouldin	4,625	19.80%
Total votes		23,357	100.0

1910 Oklahoma's 4th congressional district election
Party	Candidate	Votes	%
Democratic	Charles D. Carter (incumbent)	21,959	55.63%
Republican	Charles M. Campbell	11,979	30.35%
Socialist	J. N. Gilmore	5,534	14.02%
Total votes		39,472	100.00
Democratic hold			

1912 Democratic primary results
Party	Candidate	Votes	%
Democratic	Charles D. Carter	18,928	72.20%
Democratic	R. H. Stanley	5,716	21.80%
Democratic	J. J. Parsons	1,571	5.99%
Total votes		26,215	100.0

1912 Oklahoma's 4th congressional district election
Party	Candidate	Votes	%
Democratic	Charles D. Carter (incumbent)	23,987	51.33%
Republican	E. N. Wright	11,421	24.44%
Socialist	Fred W. Holt	11,321	24.23%
Total votes		46,729	100.00
Democratic hold			

1914 Oklahoma's 4th congressional district election
Party	Candidate	Votes	%
Democratic	Charles D. Carter (incumbent)	17,274	50.02%
Socialist	R. L. Norman	10,588	30.66%
Republican	C. H. Elting	6,479	18.76%
Progressive	Dudley B. Buell	191	0.55%
Total votes		34,532	100.0

1916 Democratic primary results
Party	Candidate	Votes	%
Democratic	Charles D. Carter (incumbent)	15,441	77.91%
Democratic	R. L. Kidd	4,378	22.09%
Total votes		19,818	100.0

1916 Oklahoma's 3rd congressional district election
Party	Candidate	Votes	%
Democratic	Charles D. Carter (incumbent)	21,182	55.12%
Republican	Gratton C. McVay	10,386	27.03%
Socialist	H. M. Shelton	6,862	17.86%
Total votes		38,430	100.00
Democratic hold			

1918 Democratic primary results
Party	Candidate	Votes	%
Democratic	Charles D. Carter (incumbent)	12,529	68.97%
Democratic	Tom W. Neal	5,637	31.03%
Total votes		18,166	100.0

1918 Oklahoma's 3rd congressional district election
Party	Candidate	Votes	%
Democratic	Charles D. Carter (incumbent)	15,635	66.79%
Republican	H. J. Fowler	6,982	27.03%
Socialist	H. M. Shelton	6,862	17.86%
Total votes		29,479	100.00
Democratic hold			

1920 Oklahoma's 3rd congressional district election
Party	Candidate	Votes	%
Democratic	Charles D. Carter (incumbent)	33,344	53.99%
Republican	James L. Shinaberger	24,188	39.17%
Socialist	Robert L. Allen	4,227	6.84%
Total votes		61,759	100.00
Democratic hold			

1922 Democratic primary results
Party	Candidate	Votes	%
Democratic	Charles D. Carter (incumbent)	17,964	40.59%
Democratic	J. B. Laughlin	15,312	34.60%
Democratic	Wilburn Cartwright	10,983	24.82%
Total votes		44,259	100.0

1922 Oklahoma's 3rd congressional district election
Party	Candidate	Votes	%
Democratic	Charles D. Carter (incumbent)	44,964	74.18%
Republican	Philas S. Jones	15,022	24.78%
Socialist	Manley L. Misenheimer	632	1.04%
Total votes		60,618	100.00
Democratic hold			

1924 Democratic primary results
Party	Candidate	Votes	%
Democratic	Charles D. Carter (incumbent)	24,351	44.22%
Democratic	Wilburn Cartwright	17,205	(31.24%
Democratic	Joe D. Summit	13,516	24.54%
Total votes		55,072	100.0

1924 Oklahoma's 3rd congressional district election
Party	Candidate	Votes	%
Democratic	Charles D. Carter (incumbent)	38,674	68.14%
Republican	Don Welch	15,425	27.18%
Farmer–Labor	R. L. Thurmond	2,659	4.69%
Total votes		56,759	100.00
Democratic hold			

1926 Democratic primary results
Party	Candidate	Votes	%
Democratic	Wilburn Cartwright	16,670	41.22%
Democratic	Charles D. Carter (incumbent)	15,605	38.59%
Democratic	Jess Harper	8,168	20.20%
Total votes		40,443	100.0

== See also ==
- List of Native Americans in the United States Congress

U.S. House of Representatives
New constituency	Member of the U.S. House of Representatives from Oklahoma's 4th congressional district 1907–1915	Succeeded by William H. Murray
Preceded by James S. Davenport	Member of the U.S. House of Representatives from Oklahoma's 3rd congressional district 1915–1927	Succeeded by Wilburn Cartwright
Preceded by John Hall Stephens	Chair of the House Indian Affairs Committee; 1917–1919	Succeeded by Homer P. Snyder
