= Elmer L. Fulton =

American politician (1865–1939)

Elmer Lincoln Fulton
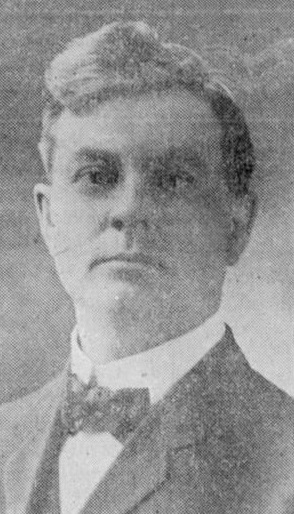

Member of the U.S. House of Representatives from Oklahoma's 2nd district
- In office November 16, 1907 – March 3, 1909
- Preceded by: District created
- Succeeded by: Dick T. Morgan

Personal details
- Born: April 22, 1865 Magnolia, Iowa, US
- Died: October 4, 1939 (aged 74) Oklahoma City, Oklahoma, US
- Resting place: Valhalla Cemetery, St. Louis, Missouri
- Party: Democratic
- Spouse: Mabel Rinehart Fulton
- Children: Marjorie McAllister Fulton Harrell;Dorothy Belle Fulton Marchbank
- Education: Tabor College
- Profession: Attorney; politician

Elmer Lincoln Fulton (April 22, 1865 – October 4, 1939) was an American lawyer and politician who served one term as a U.S. representative from Oklahoma from 1907 to 1909.

== Biography ==
Born in Magnolia, Iowa, on April 22, 1865, Fulton was son to Jacob and Eliza Ann McAllester Fulton. He moved to Nebraska in 1870 with his parents, and they settled in Pawnee City. He attended the public schools and Tabor College, Tabor, Iowa. He studied law, and was admitted to the bar in 1895. He commenced practice at Pawnee City until he moved to Stillwater, in the Territory of Oklahoma, in 1901. There, he continued the practice of law.

=== Congress ===
Fulton was elected as a Democrat to the Sixtieth Congress September 17, 1907, and served from November 16, 1907, when Oklahoma was admitted as a State into the Union, until March 4, 1909. He was an unsuccessful candidate for reelection in 1908 to the Sixty-first Congress.

=== Later career ===
After leaving Congress, he resumed the practice of law in Oklahoma City, Oklahoma.

Appointed assistant attorney general of Oklahoma in 1919, Fulton served until 1922, when he resigned and again resumed the practice of his profession.

== Death ==
Fulton died on October 4, 1939 (age 74 years, 165 days) in Oklahoma City, Oklahoma. He is interred at Valhalla Cemetery, St. Louis, Missouri.

=== Family ===
He married Mabel Rinehart on March 7, 1906.

Senator Charles W. Fulton from Oregon, was his brother.

U.S. House of Representatives
Preceded by District created	United States Representative for the 2nd congressional district of Oklahoma; 1907–1909	Succeeded by Dick T. Morgan
