= 1916 United States House of Representatives elections =

House elections for the 65th U.S. Congress

- November 7, 1916 (Note: Maine held early elections on September 11, 1916.)

All 435 seats in the United States House of Representatives 218 seats needed for a majority
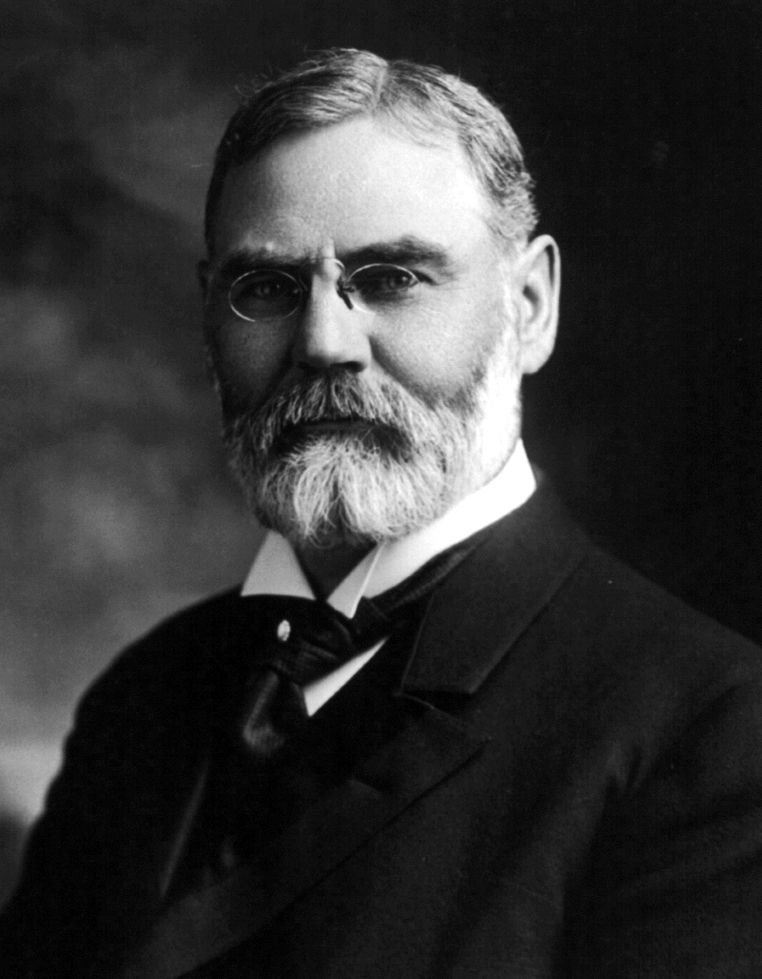

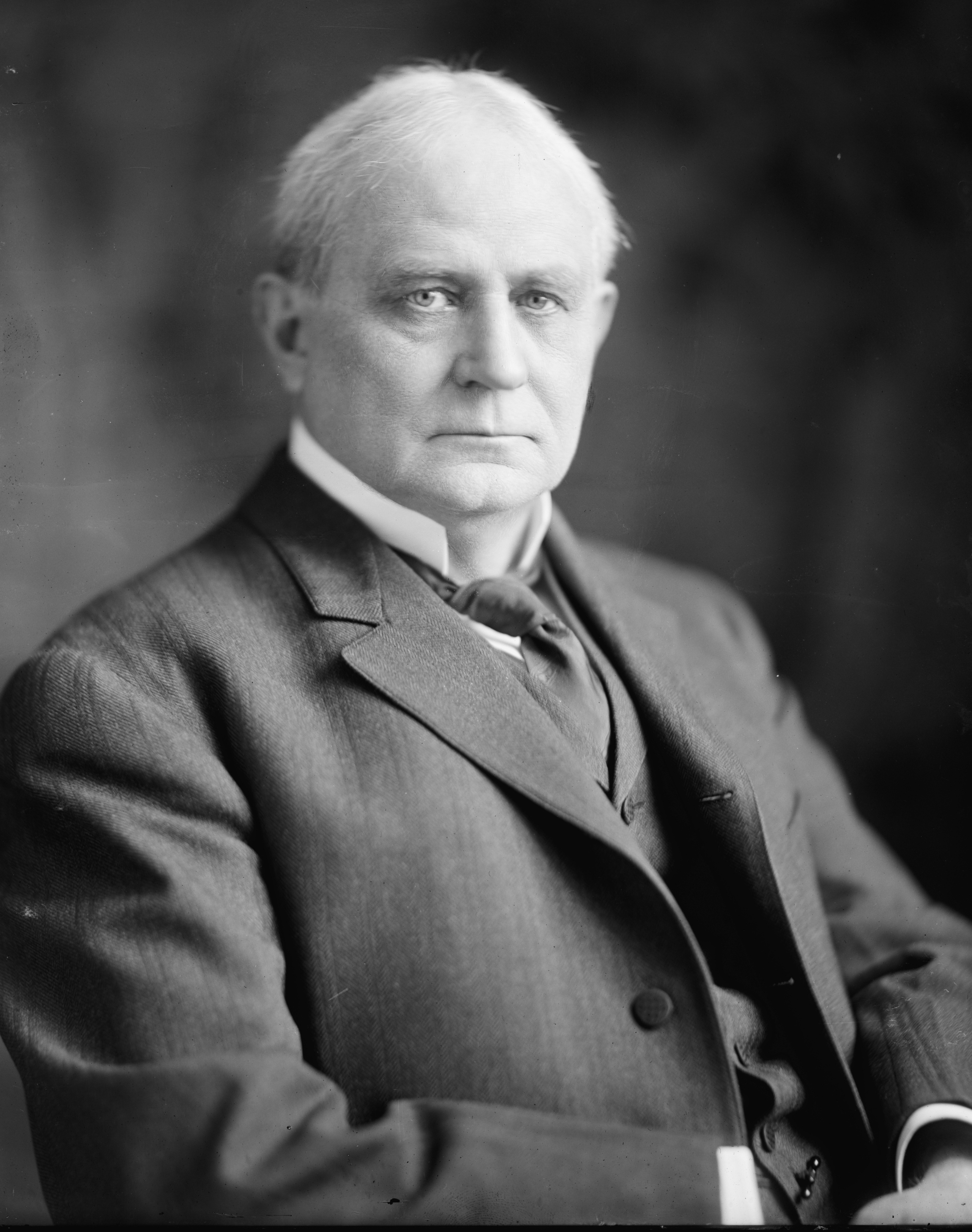
	Majority party	Minority party
Leader	James Mann	Champ Clark
Party	Republican	Democratic
Leader since	March 4, 1911	March 4, 1909
Leader's seat	Illinois 2nd	Missouri 9th
Last election	196 seats	230 seats
Seats won	215 (Note: Thomas D. Schall would run as a Progressive in the 10th district of Minnesota, defeating Republican opponent Lowell E. Jepson. Schall had joined the Republican Party after he was re-elected, and would caucus with the Republicans upon being sworn into the House.)	214 (Note: Democrats maintained control of the U.S. House after the 1916 elections by forming a 218-member coalition with the three Progressive members and the one Socialist member.)
Seat change	▲19	▼16
Popular vote	8,052,247	7,641,274
Percentage	48.09%	45.64%
Swing	▲5.47pp	▲3.68pp
	Third party	Fourth party
Party	Progressive	Socialist
Last election	6 seats	1 seat
Seats won	3	1
Seat change	▼3	Steady
Popular vote	131,103 (Note: This includes votes for those who ran primarily on the Washington Party Ballot Line.)	604,304
Percentage	0.78%	3.61%
Swing	▼7.22pp	▼0.93pp
	Fifth party	Sixth party
Party	Prohibition	Independent
Last election	1 seat	1 seat
Seats won	1	1 (Note: Alvan Tufts Fuller would run as an independent in the 9th district of Massachusetts, defeating long-time Republican Congressman Ernest Roberts. Fuller had rejoined the Republican Party earlier in the year, and would caucus with the Republicans upon being sworn into the House.)
Seat change	Steady	Steady
Popular vote	248,451	65,586
Percentage	1.48%	0.39%
Swing	▼0.20pp	▼0.16pp
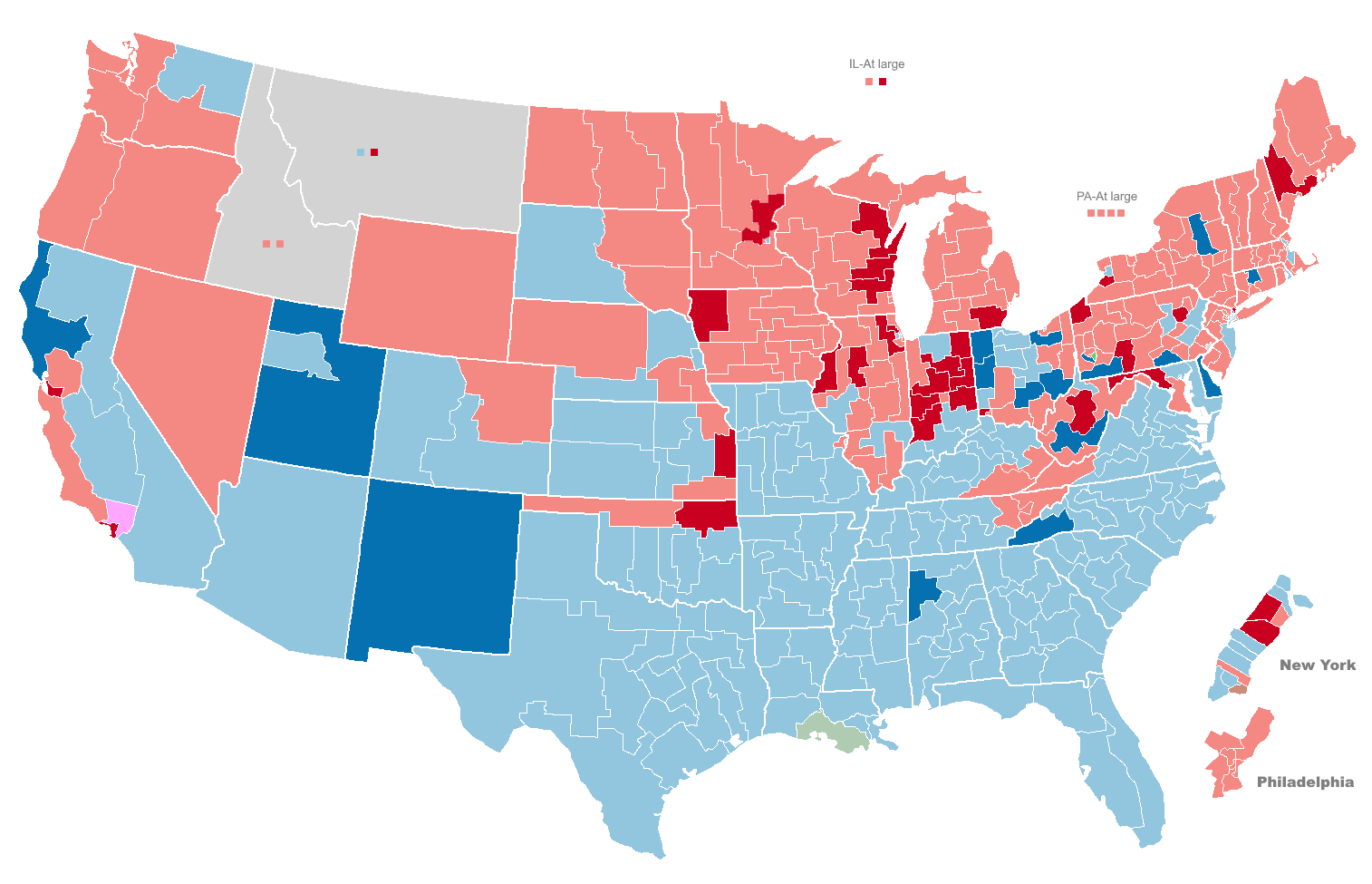
- Results: Democratic hold Democratic gain Republican hold Republican gain Progressive hold Progressive gain Prohibition hold Socialist hold
Speaker before election
Champ Clark
Democratic
Elected Speaker
Champ Clark
Democratic

1916 United States House of Representatives elections were elections for the United States House of Representatives to elect members to serve in the 65th United States Congress. They were held for the most part on November 7, 1916, while Maine held theirs on September 11. They coincided with the re-election of President Woodrow Wilson.

Wilson eked out a narrow re-election, but his Democratic Party lost seats to the Republican Party. Wilson's hybrid approach, which injected a progressive element into Democratic policies, had proved to be dissatisfying to much of the nation. International affairs also became important in the traditionally non-interventionist United States, as voters attempted to determine which party would be best served to keep the nation from entering the Great War.

Republicans won a plurality of seats in the 1916 election. However, when the 65th Congress convened in April 1917, the Democrats narrowly maintained control of the House, forming an alliance with third-party (Progressive and Socialist) members. Not since the 34th Congress (1855–1857) had the party with the most seats not been part of the ruling government. This Congress is the last example to date of a type of coalition holding power in the House, rather than a single party winning a majority of seats. This was also the last time that no party in the house held an overall majority.

Jeannette Rankin, a Republican from Montana, became the first woman ever elected to congress.

== Election summaries ==
↓
214	5	216
Democratic	(Note: Progressives won 3 seats, and there was 1 Prohibitionist and 1 Socialist.)	Republican

State	Type	Total seats	Democratic		Progressive		Republican		Others	
State	Type	Total seats	Seats	Change	Seats	Change	Seats	Change	Seats	Change
Alabama	District (Note: At-large seat eliminated in redistricting.)	10	10	Steady	0	Steady	0	Steady	0	Steady
Arizona	At-large	1	1	Steady	0	Steady	0	Steady	0	Steady
Arkansas	District	7	7	Steady	0	Steady	0	Steady	0	Steady
California	District	11	4	▲1	1	▼1	5	▲1	1 (Note: Prohibition)	▼1
Colorado	District	4	3	Steady	0	Steady	1	Steady	0	Steady
Connecticut	District	5	1	▲1	0	Steady	4	▼1	0	Steady
Delaware	At-large	1	1	▲1	0	Steady	0	▼1	0	Steady
Florida	District	4	4	Steady	0	Steady	0	Steady	0	Steady
Georgia	District	12	12	Steady	0	Steady	0	Steady	0	Steady
Idaho	At-large	2	0	Steady	0	Steady	2	Steady	0	Steady
Illinois	District +2 at-large	27	6	▼4	0	▼1	21	▲5	0	Steady
Indiana	District	13	4	▼7	0	Steady	9	▲7	0	Steady
Iowa	District	11	0	▼1	0	Steady	11	▲1	0	Steady
Kansas	District	8	5	▼1	0	Steady	3	▲1	0	Steady
Kentucky	District	11	9	Steady	0	Steady	2	Steady	0	Steady
Louisiana	District	8	7	▼1	1	▲1	0	Steady	0	Steady
Maine (Note: Elections held early.)	District	4	0	▼1	0	Steady	4	▲1	0	Steady
Maryland	District	6	4	▼1	0	Steady	2	▲1	0	Steady
Massachusetts	District	16	4	Steady	0	Steady	12	Steady	0	Steady
Michigan	District	13	1	▼1	0	Steady	12	▲1	0	Steady
Minnesota	District	10	1	Steady	0	▼1	9	▲1	0	Steady
Mississippi	District	8	8	Steady	0	Steady	0	Steady	0	Steady
Missouri	District	16	14	Steady	0	Steady	2	Steady	0	Steady
Montana	At-large	2	1	▼1	0	Steady	1	▲1	0	Steady
Nebraska	District	6	3	Steady	0	Steady	3	Steady	0	Steady
Nevada	At-large	1	0	Steady	0	Steady	1	Steady	0	Steady
New Hampshire	District	2	0	▼2	0	Steady	2	▲2	0	Steady
New Jersey	District	12	3	▼1	0	Steady	9	▲1	0	Steady
New Mexico	At-large	1	1	▲1	0	Steady	0	▼1	0	Steady
New York	District	43	16	▼3	0	▼1	26	▲4	1 (Note: Socialist)	Steady
North Carolina	District	10	10	▲1	0	Steady	0	▼1	0	Steady
North Dakota	District	3	0	Steady	0	Steady	3	Steady	0	Steady
Ohio	District	22	13	▲4	0	Steady	9	▼4	0	Steady
Oklahoma	District	8	6	▼1	0	Steady	2	▲1	0	Steady
Oregon	District	3	0	Steady	0	Steady	3	Steady	0	Steady
Pennsylvania	District +4 at-large	36	6	Steady	1	▲1	29	▼1	0	Steady
Rhode Island	District	3	1	Steady	0	Steady	2	Steady	0	Steady
South Carolina	District	7	7	Steady	0	Steady	0	Steady	0	Steady
South Dakota	District	3	1	Steady	0	Steady	2	Steady	0	Steady
Tennessee	District	10	8	Steady	0	Steady	2	Steady	0	Steady
Texas	District +2 at-large	18	18	Steady	0	Steady	0	Steady	0	Steady
Utah	District	2	2	▲1	0	Steady	0	▼1	0	Steady
Vermont	District	2	0	Steady	0	Steady	2	Steady	0	Steady
Virginia	District	10	9	Steady	0	Steady	1	Steady	0	Steady
Washington	District	5	1	▲1	0	▼2	4	▲1	0	Steady
West Virginia	District	6	2	▼1	0	Steady	4	▲1	0	Steady
Wisconsin	District	11	0	▼3	0	Steady	11	▲3	0	Steady
Wyoming	At-large	1	0	Steady	0	Steady	1	Steady	0	Steady
Total		435	214; 49.2%	▼16	3; 0.7%	▼2	216 (Note: Includes 1 Independent Republican.); 49.7%	▲19	2 (Note: 1 Socialist and 1 Prohibition.); 0.5%	▼1

Popular vote
Republican	48.59%
Democratic	46.11%
Socialist	3.65%
Prohibition	1.50%
Progressive	0.79%
Independent	0.40%
Others	0.00%

House seats
Republican	49.43%
Democratic	49.20%
Progressive	0.69%
Socialist	0.23%
Prohibition	0.23%
Independent	0.23%

The Democrats retained control of the House by forming a coalition with the three Progressive members and the single Socialist member, combining to form a razor-thin majority of 218 Representatives.

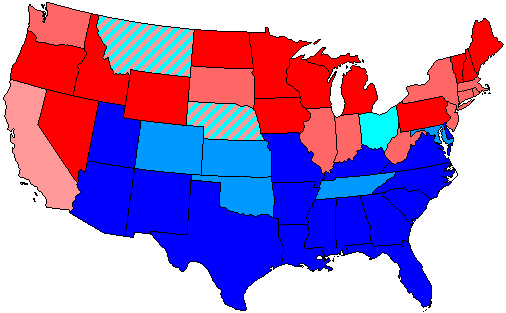
House seats by party holding plurality in state: 80.1-100% Democratic / 80.1-100% Republican; 60.1-80% Democratic / 60.1-80% Republican; Up to 60% Democratic / Up to 60% Republican

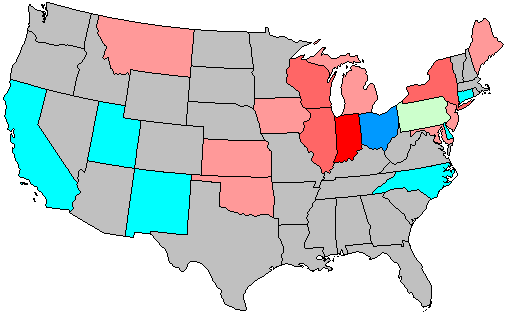
Net gain in party representation: 6+ Democratic gain / / 6+ Republican gain; 3–5 Democratic gain / / 3–5 Republican gain; 1–2 Democratic gain / 1–2 Progressive gain / 1–2 Republican gain; no net change

== Early election date ==
Maine held its election early, on September 11, 1916. There had previously been multiple states with earlier elections, but between 1914 and 1958, Maine was alone in holding early elections.

== Special elections ==
There were special elections in 1916 to the 64th United States Congress.

Special elections are sorted by date then district.

District	Incumbent			This race	
District	Member	Party	First elected	Results	Candidates
Mississippi 5	Samuel A. Witherspoon	Democratic	1910	Incumbent died November 24, 1915. New member elected January 4, 1916. Democratic hold.	▌ ✓ William W. Venable (Democratic) 33.84%; ▌W. W. Joyner (Democratic) 31.09%; ▌J. B. Byrd (Democratic) 22.75%; ▌W. A. Ellis (Democratic) 5.94%; ▌C. L. Dobbs (Democratic) 5.80%; ▌I. S. Watson (Democratic) 0.59%
West Virginia 2	William G. Brown Jr.	Democratic	1910	Incumbent died March 9, 1916. New member elected May 9, 1916. Republican gain. Winner was later re-elected; see below.	▌ ✓ George M. Bowers (Republican) 50.74%; ▌Samuel V. Woods (Democratic) 49.26%
California 10	William Stephens	Progressive	1910	Incumbent resigned July 22, 1916 to become Lieutenant Governor of California. New member elected November 7, 1916. Progressive hold. Winner was not elected to the next term; see below.	▌ ✓ Henry S. Benedict (Progressive) 62.82%; ▌Joy Clark (Independent) 23.59%; ▌Henry Clay Needham (Prohibition) 4.32%; ▌George Clark (Unknown) 3.54%; ▌James H. Ryckman (Socialist) 3.01%; ▌Rufus V. Bowden (Democratic) 1.83%; ▌John C. Wray (Unknown) 0.89%
Virginia 7	James Hay	Democratic	1896	Incumbent resigned October 1, 1916 to become Judge of the United States Court of Claims. New member elected November 7, 1916. Democratic hold. Winner was also elected to the next term; see below.	▌ ✓ Thomas W. Harrison (Democratic) 61.29%; ▌John Paul (Republican) 37.76%

== Alabama ==
District	Incumbent			This race	
District	Member	Party	First elected	Results	Candidates
Alabama 1	Oscar L. Gray	Democratic	1914	Incumbent re-elected.	▌ ✓ Oscar L. Gray (Democratic) 100.0%
Alabama 2	S. Hubert Dent Jr.	Democratic	1908	Incumbent re-elected.	▌ ✓ S. Hubert Dent Jr. (Democratic) 97.63%; ▌E. H. Titus (Socialist) 2.37%
Alabama 3	Henry B. Steagall	Democratic	1914	Incumbent re-elected.	▌ ✓ Henry B. Steagall (Democratic) 100.0%
Alabama 4	Fred L. Blackmon	Democratic	1910	Incumbent re-elected.	▌ ✓ Fred L. Blackmon (Democratic) 67.56%; ▌J. B. Atkinson (Republican) 32.45%
Alabama 5	J. Thomas Heflin	Democratic	1904 (special)	Incumbent re-elected.	▌ ✓ J. Thomas Heflin (Democratic) 81.37%; ▌W. D. Harwell (Republican) 18.63%
Alabama 6	William B. Oliver	Democratic	1914	Incumbent re-elected.	▌ ✓ William B. Oliver (Democratic) 100.0%
Alabama 7	John L. Burnett	Democratic	1898	Incumbent re-elected.	▌ ✓ John L. Burnett (Democratic) 60.10%; ▌T. H. Davidson (Republican) 39.90%
Alabama 8	Edward B. Almon	Democratic	1914	Incumbent re-elected.	▌ ✓ Edward B. Almon (Democratic) 85.20%; ▌W. R. Hutchens (Republican) 13.01%; ▌T. G. Waddell (Socialist) 1.79%
Alabama 9	George Huddleston	Democratic	1914	Incumbent re-elected.	▌ ✓ George Huddleston (Democratic) 86.08%; ▌Francis Latady (Republican) 12.09%; ▌H. O. Hardin (Socialist) 1.83%
Alabama 10	None (New district)			New seat. Democratic gain.	▌ ✓ William B. Bankhead (Democratic) 54.29%; ▌Newman H. Freeman (Republican) 45.71%

== Arizona ==
District	Incumbent			This race	
District	Member	Party	First elected	Results	Candidates
Arizona at-large	Carl Hayden	Democratic	1911	Incumbent re-elected.	▌ ✓ Carl Hayden (Democratic) 60.40%; ▌Thomas Maddock (Republican) 37.90%; ▌Peter Robertson (Socialist) 1.70%

== Arkansas ==
District	Incumbent			This race	
District	Member	Party	First elected	Results	Candidates
Arkansas 1	Thaddeus H. Caraway	Democratic	1912	Incumbent re-elected.	▌ ✓ Thaddeus H. Caraway (Democratic) 100.0%
Arkansas 2	William A. Oldfield	Democratic	1908	Incumbent re-elected.	▌ ✓ William A. Oldfield (Democratic) 73.55%; ▌G. W. Wells (Republican) 26.45%
Arkansas 3	John N. Tillman	Democratic	1914	Incumbent re-elected.	▌ ✓ John N. Tillman (Democratic) 62.37%; ▌A. J. Russell (Republican) 37.63%
Arkansas 4	Otis Wingo	Democratic	1912	Incumbent re-elected.	▌ ✓ Otis Wingo (Democratic) 100.0%
Arkansas 5	Henderson M. Jacoway	Democratic	1910	Incumbent re-elected.	▌ ✓ Henderson M. Jacoway (Democratic) 74.24%; ▌George A. McConnell (Republican) 25.76%
Arkansas 6	Samuel M. Taylor	Democratic	1913 (special)	Incumbent re-elected.	▌ ✓ Samuel M. Taylor (Democratic) 100.0%
Arkansas 7	William S. Goodwin	Democratic	1910	Incumbent re-elected.	▌ ✓ William S. Goodwin (Democratic) 71.91%; ▌J. G. Brown (Republican) 28.10%

== California ==
District	Incumbent			This race	
District	Member	Party	First elected	Results	Candidates
California 1	William Kent	Independent	1910	Incumbent retired. Democratic gain.	▌ ✓ Clarence F. Lea (Democratic) 48.8%; ▌Edward H. Hart (Republican) 42.8%; ▌Mary M. Morgan (Socialist) 5.5%; ▌Jay Scott Ryder (Prohibition) 2.9%
California 2	John E. Raker	Democratic	1910	Incumbent re-elected.	▌ ✓ John E. Raker (Democratic) 71.0%; ▌James T. Matlock (Republican) 29.0%
California 3	Charles F. Curry	Republican	1912	Incumbent re-elected.	▌ ✓ Charles F. Curry (Republican) 66.7%; ▌O. W. Kennedy (Democratic) 23.4%; ▌Ben Cooper (Socialist) 6.2%; ▌Edwin F. Van Vlear (Prohibition) 3.7%
California 4	Julius Kahn	Republican	1898	Incumbent re-elected.	▌ ✓ Julius Kahn (Republican) 77.2%; ▌J. M. Fernald (Democratic) 15.7%; ▌Allen K. Gifford (Socialist) 5.6%; ▌Henry W. Hutchinson (Prohibition) 1.5%
California 5	John I. Nolan	Republican	1912	Incumbent re-elected.	▌ ✓ John I. Nolan (Republican) 84.7%; ▌Charles A. Preston (Socialist) 9.6%; ▌Frederick Head (Prohibition) 5.8%
California 6	John A. Elston	Progressive	1912	Incumbent re-elected.	▌ ✓ John A. Elston (Progressive) 64.6%; ▌H. Avery Whitney (Democratic) 22.6%; ▌Luella Twining (Socialist) 8.7%; ▌Harlow E. Wolcott (Prohibition) 4.1%
California 7	Denver S. Church	Democratic	1912	Incumbent re-elected.	▌ ✓ Denver S. Church (Democratic) 51%; ▌W. W. Phillips (Republican) 36.4%; ▌Harry M. McKee (Socialist) 7.2%; ▌J. F. Butler (Prohibition) 5.3%
California 8	Everis A. Hayes	Republican	1904	Incumbent re-elected.	▌ ✓ Everis A. Hayes (Republican) 68.6%; ▌George S. Walker (Prog./Dem. Fusion) 23.8%; ▌Cora Pattleton Wilson (Socialist) 7.5%
California 9	Charles H. Randall	Prohibition	1914	Incumbent re-elected.	▌ ✓ Charles H. Randall (Prohibition) 57.8%; ▌Charles W. Bell (Independent) 32.7%; ▌Ralph L. Criswell (Socialist) 9.5%
California 10	Vacant			William Stephens (P) resigned July 22, 1916 to become Lieutenant Governor of California. Republican gain. Successor was not elected to finish the term.	▌ ✓ Henry Z. Osborne (Republican) 49.5%; ▌Rufus V. Bowden (Democratic) 25.7%; ▌Henry S. Benedict (Progressive) 11.1%; ▌James H. Ryckman (Socialist) 7.0%; ▌Henry Clay Needham (Prohibition) 6.8%
California 11	William Kettner	Democratic	1912	Incumbent re-elected.	▌ ✓ William Kettner (Democratic) 44.5%; ▌Robert C. Harbison (Republican) 35.7%; ▌James S. Edwards (Prohibition) 15.6%; ▌Marcus W. Robbins (Socialist) 4.1%

== Colorado ==
District	Incumbent			This race	
District	Member	Party	First elected	Results	Candidates
Colorado 1	Benjamin Hilliard	Democratic	1914	Incumbent re-elected.	▌ ✓ Benjamin Hilliard (Democratic) 48.5%; ▌William N. Vaile (Republican) 42.1%; ▌George J. Kindel (Liberal) 5.3%; ▌Charles A. Ahlstrom (Socialist) 4.1%
Colorado 2	Charles B. Timberlake	Republican	1914	Incumbent re-elected.	▌ ✓ Charles B. Timberlake (Republican) 55.9%; ▌R. E. Jones (Democratic) 38.4%; ▌J. Edward Johnson (Socialist) 5.1%; ▌Ralph R. Drennen (Progressive) 0.7%
Colorado 3	Edward Keating	Democratic	1912	Incumbent re-elected.	▌ ✓ Edward Keating (Democratic) 53.8%; ▌George E. McClelland (Republican) 41.7%; ▌David P. McGrew (Socialist) 3.3%; ▌William G. Francis (Progressive) 0.6%; ▌William H. Steele (Soc. Labor) 0.6%
Colorado 4	Edward T. Taylor	Democratic	1908	Incumbent re-elected.	▌ ✓ Edward T. Taylor (Democratic) 65.8%; ▌Henry J. Baird (Republican) 28.5%; ▌Emery D. Cox (Socialist) 5.7%

== Connecticut ==
District	Incumbent			This race	
District	Member	Party	First elected	Results	Candidates
Connecticut 1	P. Davis Oakey	Republican	1914	Incumbent lost re-election. Democratic gain.	▌ ✓ Augustine Lonergan (Democratic) 49.58%; ▌P. Davis Oakey (Republican) 46.17%; ▌John M. Klein (Socialist) 2.53%; Others: ▌Charles J. Fancher (Prohibition) 1.37%; ▌Frederick Fellerman (Socialist Labor) 0.35%
Connecticut 2	Richard P. Freeman	Republican	1914	Incumbent re-elected.	▌ ✓ Richard P. Freeman (Republican) 52.75%; ▌Daniel P. Dunn (Democratic) 44.55%; Others: ▌Albert Boardman (Socialist) 1.55%; ▌Frederick L. Hall (Prohibition) 0.94%; ▌Charles H. Funk (Socialist Labor) 0.22%
Connecticut 3	John Q. Tilson	Republican	1914	Incumbent re-elected.	▌ ✓ John Q. Tilson (Republican) 48.52%; ▌Thomas L. Reilly (Democratic) 47.15%; ▌William E. White (Socialist) 3.30%; Others: ▌Edwin Beardsley (Prohibition) 0.68%; ▌John P. Johnson (Socialist Labor) 0.36%
Connecticut 4	Ebenezer J. Hill	Republican	1914	Incumbent re-elected.	▌ ✓ Ebenezer J. Hill (Republican) 53.79%; ▌Jeremiah Donovan (Democratic) 42.96%; ▌George Moffatt (Socialist) 2.37%; Others: ▌Alfred P. Engstrom (Prohibition) 0.61%; ▌Edward Pryor (Socialist Labor) 0.27%
Connecticut 5	James P. Glynn	Republican	1914	Incumbent re-elected.	▌ ✓ James P. Glynn (Republican) 49.79%; ▌William Kennedy (Democratic) 46.97%; ▌Michael Conton (Socialist) 2.52%; Others: ▌Joseph B. Reid (Prohibition) 0.61%; ▌Hokan Larsson (Socialist Labor) 0.22%

== Delaware ==
District	Incumbent			This race	
District	Member	Party	First elected	Results	Candidates
Delaware at-large	Thomas W. Miller	Republican	1914	Incumbent lost re-election. Democratic gain.	▌Albert F. Polk (Democratic) 47.64%; ▌Thomas W. Miller (Republican) 47.26%; ▌Edward G. Bradford (Progressive) 4.16%; ▌Frederick K. Miller (Socialist) 0.95%

== Florida ==
District	Incumbent			This race	
District	Member	Party	First elected	Results	Candidates
Florida 1	Stephen M. Sparkman	Democratic	1894	Incumbent retired. Democratic hold.	▌ ✓ Herbert J. Drane (Democratic) 82.21%; ▌H. W. Bishop (Republican) 11.59%; ▌Frank L. Sullivan (Socialist) 6.20%
Florida 2	Frank Clark	Democratic	1904	Incumbent re-elected.	▌ ✓ Frank Clark (Democratic) 79.93%; ▌W. H. Gober (Republican) 10.88%; ▌Frances P. Coffin (Prohibition) 9.20%
Florida 3	Emmett Wilson	Democratic	1912	Incumbent lost renomination. Democratic hold.	▌ ✓ Walter Kehoe (Democratic) 83.65%; ▌Peter H. Miller (Republican) 16.35%
Florida 4	William J. Sears	Democratic	1914	Incumbent re-elected.	▌ ✓ William J. Sears (Democratic) 68.88%; ▌D. T. Gerow (Republican) 23.68%; ▌A. N. Jackson (Socialist) 7.44%

== Georgia ==
District	Incumbent			This race	
District	Member	Party	First elected	Results	Candidates
Georgia 1	Charles G. Edwards	Democratic	1906	Incumbent retired. Democratic hold.	▌ ✓ James W. Overstreet (Democratic); Unopposed
Georgia 2	Frank Park	Democratic	1913 (special)	Incumbent re-elected.	▌ ✓ Frank Park (Democratic); Unopposed
Georgia 3	Charles R. Crisp	Democratic	1912	Incumbent re-elected.	▌ ✓ Charles R. Crisp (Democratic); Unopposed
Georgia 4	William C. Adamson	Democratic	1896	Incumbent re-elected.	▌ ✓ William C. Adamson (Democratic); Unopposed
Georgia 5	William S. Howard	Democratic	1910	Incumbent re-elected.	▌ ✓ William S. Howard (Democratic) 88.83%; ▌Charles J. Moore (Republican) 11.17%
Georgia 6	James W. Wise	Democratic	1914	Incumbent re-elected.	▌ ✓ James W. Wise (Democratic); Unopposed
Georgia 7	Gordon Lee	Democratic	1904	Incumbent re-elected.	▌ ✓ Gordon Lee (Democratic) 77.85%; ▌Walter Akerman (Republican) 20.52%; ▌S. H. Bearden (Unknown) 1.63%
Georgia 8	Samuel J. Tribble	Democratic	1910	Incumbent re-elected.	▌ ✓ Samuel J. Tribble (Democratic); Unopposed
Georgia 9	Thomas M. Bell	Democratic	1904	Incumbent re-elected.	▌ ✓ Thomas M. Bell (Democratic) 88.86%; ▌J. E. Adams (Republican) 11.14%
Georgia 10	Carl Vinson	Democratic	1914	Incumbent re-elected.	▌ ✓ Carl Vinson (Democratic); Unopposed
Georgia 11	John R. Walker	Democratic	1912	Incumbent re-elected	▌ ✓ John R. Walker (Democratic); Unopposed
Georgia 12	Dudley M. Hughes	Democratic	1908	Incumbent lost renomination. Democratic hold.	▌ ✓ William W. Larsen (Democratic) 95.8%; [data missing]

== Idaho ==
District	Incumbent			This race	
District	Member	Party	First elected	Results	Candidates
Idaho at-large 2 seats on a general ticket	Robert M. McCracken	Republican	1914	Incumbent lost renomination. Republican hold.	▌ ✓ Burton L. French (Republican) 25.38%; ▌ ✓ Addison T. Smith (Republican) 25.05%; ▌Marion J. Kerr (Democratic) 21.91%; ▌John V. Stanley (Democratic) 21.34%; ▌A. B. Clark (Socialist) 3.17%; ▌Sam G. Gilleland (Socialist) 3.15%
Idaho at-large 2 seats on a general ticket	Addison T. Smith	Republican	1912	Incumbent re-elected.	▌ ✓ Burton L. French (Republican) 25.38%; ▌ ✓ Addison T. Smith (Republican) 25.05%; ▌Marion J. Kerr (Democratic) 21.91%; ▌John V. Stanley (Democratic) 21.34%; ▌A. B. Clark (Socialist) 3.17%; ▌Sam G. Gilleland (Socialist) 3.15%

== Illinois ==
District	Incumbent			This race	
District	Member	Party	First elected	Results	Candidates
Illinois 1	Martin B. Madden	Republican	1904	Incumbent re-elected.	▌ ✓ Martin B. Madden (Republican) 59.06%; ▌William J. Hennessey (Democratic) 38.77%; ▌G. J. Carlisle (Socialist) 2.17%
Illinois 2	James R. Mann	Republican	1896	Incumbent re-elected.	▌ ✓ James R. Mann (Republican) 62.95%; ▌Philip H. Treacy (Democratic) 32.39%; ▌James W. Lafferty (Socialist) 4.66%
Illinois 3	William W. Wilson	Republican	1914	Incumbent re-elected.	▌ ✓ William W. Wilson (Republican) 55.67%; ▌Bernard McMahon (Democratic) 40.27%; ▌John D. Dobelman (Socialist) 4.06%
Illinois 4	James T. McDermott	Democratic	1906	Incumbent retired. Democratic hold.	▌ ✓ Charles Martin (Democratic) 58.45%; ▌John Golombiewski (Republican) 36.82%; ▌Carl G. Hoffman (Socialist) 4.73%
Illinois 5	Adolph J. Sabath	Democratic	1906	Incumbent re-elected.	▌ ✓ Adolph J. Sabath (Democratic) 60.68%; ▌David T. Alexander (Republican) 32.26%; ▌Charles Toepper (Socialist) 7.06%
Illinois 6	James McAndrews	Democratic	1912	Incumbent re-elected.	▌ ✓ James McAndrews (Democratic) 48.54%; ▌Arthur W. Fulton (Republican) 45.60%; ▌Charles H. Hair (Socialist) 5.60%; ▌J. W. Treager (Independent) 0.26%
Illinois 7	Frank Buchanan	Democratic	1910	Incumbent lost re-election. Republican gain.	▌ ✓ Niels Juul (Republican) 50.90%; ▌Frank Buchanan (Democratic) 40.13%; ▌Carl D. Thompson (Socialist) 8.97%
Illinois 8	Thomas Gallagher	Democratic	1908	Incumbent re-elected.	▌ ✓ Thomas Gallagher (Democratic) 63.42%; ▌Frank Sullivan (Republican) 36.58%
Illinois 9	Frederick A. Britten	Republican	1912	Incumbent re-elected.	▌ ✓ Frederick A. Britten (Republican) 59.23%; ▌James H. Poage (Democratic) 35.34%; ▌Andrew Lafin (Socialist) 5.44%
Illinois 10	George E. Foss	Republican	1914	Incumbent re-elected.	▌ ✓ George E. Foss (Republican) 59.35%; ▌Samuel C. Herren (Democratic) 29.70%; ▌Carl Hjalmar Lundquist (Independent) 6.13%; ▌Herbert S. Racine (Socialist) 4.82%
Illinois 11	Ira C. Copley	Republican	1910	Incumbent re-elected.	▌ ✓ Ira C. Copley (Republican) 69.03%; ▌William C. Mooney (Democratic) 28.24%; ▌William C. Langhorst (Socialist) 2.35%; ▌R. C. Copley (Progressive) 0.38%
Illinois 12	Charles Eugene Fuller	Republican	1914	Incumbent re-elected.	▌ ✓ Charles Eugene Fuller (Republican) 65.96%; ▌Walter Panneck (Democratic) 29.59%; ▌Joseph B. Hoffman (Socialist) 4.30%; ▌J. Frank Deuel (Progressive) 0.15%
Illinois 13	John C. McKenzie	Republican	1910	Incumbent re-elected.	▌ ✓ John C. McKenzie (Republican) 68.12%; ▌F. P. Dudley (Democratic) 30.12%; ▌Xavier F. Gehant (Socialist) 1.76%
Illinois 14	Clyde H. Tavenner	Democratic	1912	Incumbent lost re-election. Republican gain.	▌ ✓ William J. Graham (Republican) 48.48%; ▌Clyde H. Tavenner (Democratic) 47.42%; ▌Nick S. Dexter (Socialist) 3.91%; ▌Cloyd E. Kaufman (Progressive) 0.19%
Illinois 15	Edward John King	Republican	1914	Incumbent re-elected.	▌ ✓ Edward John King (Republican) 54.53%; ▌Edward P. Allen (Democratic) 41.86%; ▌Conrad F. Nystrom (Socialist) 3.62%
Illinois 16	Claude U. Stone	Democratic	1910	Incumbent lost re-election. Republican gain.	▌ ✓ Clifford C. Ireland (Republican) 49.93%; ▌Claude U. Stone (Democratic) 41.55%; ▌Frank P. Elzer (Socialist) 1.81%
Illinois 17	John A. Sterling	Republican	1914	Incumbent re-elected.	▌ ✓ John A. Sterling (Republican) 56.64%; ▌S. A. Rathbun (Democratic) 41.55%; ▌John A. Bruell (Socialist) 1.81%
Illinois 18	Joseph G. Cannon	Republican	1914	Incumbent re-elected.	▌ ✓ Joseph G. Cannon (Republican) 54.18%; ▌Armand E. Smith (Democratic) 43.74%; Others: ▌Edward M. Methe (Socialist) 1.41%; ▌William H. Dunn (Progressive) 0.67%
Illinois 19	William B. McKinley	Republican	1914	Incumbent re-elected.	▌ ✓ William B. McKinley (Republican) 52.65%; ▌Franklin R. Dove (Democratic) 45.84%; ▌Charles Peebles (Socialist) 1.51%
Illinois 20	Henry T. Rainey	Democratic	1902	Incumbent re-elected.	▌ ✓ Henry T. Rainey (Democratic) 55.56%; ▌Walter B. Sayler (Republican) 43.37%; ▌Frank Hoover (Socialist) 1.08%
Illinois 21	Loren E. Wheeler	Republican	1914	Incumbent re-elected.	▌ ✓ Loren E. Wheeler (Republican) 49.98%; ▌Thomas Rees (Democratic) 45.37%; ▌Edward A. Wieck (Socialist) 4.22%; ▌William A. Fuson (Progressive) 0.42%
Illinois 22	William A. Rodenberg	Republican	1914	Incumbent re-elected.	▌ ✓ William A. Rodenberg (Republican) 50.40%; ▌D. H. Mudge (Democratic) 46.45%; ▌Earl G. Galloway (Socialist) 2.95%; ▌Charles F. Steizel (Progressive) 0.20%
Illinois 23	Martin D. Foster	Democratic	1906	Incumbent re-elected.	▌ ✓ Martin D. Foster (Democratic) 52.91%; ▌Harry C. Ferriman (Republican) 44.68%; ▌John C. Weibel (Socialist) 2.00%; ▌B. F. Moore (Progressive) 0.41%
Illinois 24	Thomas Sutler Williams	Republican	1914	Incumbent re-elected.	▌ ✓ Thomas Sutler Williams (Republican) 54.99%; ▌Louis W. Goetzman (Democratic) 42.89%; ▌J. H. Evans (Socialist) 2.12%
Illinois 25	Edward E. Denison	Republican	1914	Incumbent re-elected.	▌ ✓ Edward E. Denison (Republican) 52.16%; ▌Andrew J. Rendleman (Democratic) 44.93%; ▌R. E. Baty (Socialist) 2.87%
Illinois at-large 2 seats on a general ticket	Burnett M. Chiperfield	Republican	1914	Incumbent retired. Republican hold.	▌ ✓ Medill McCormick (Republican) 27.21%; ▌ ✓ William E. Mason (Republican) 26.42%; ▌William E. Williams (Democratic) 21.01%; ▌Joseph O. Kostner (Democratic) 20.71%; Others: ▌J. Louis Engdahl (Socialist) 1.92%; ▌Walter Huggins (Socialist) 1.88%; ▌Charles W. Williams (Prohibition) 0.37%; ▌Clay Freeman Gaumer (Prohibition) 0.36%; ▌Frank Hosking (Socialist Labor) 0.07%; ▌John Kowatzek (Socialist Labor) 0.07%
Illinois at-large 2 seats on a general ticket	William E. Williams	Democratic	1912	Incumbent lost re-election. Republican gain.	▌ ✓ Medill McCormick (Republican) 27.21%; ▌ ✓ William E. Mason (Republican) 26.42%; ▌William E. Williams (Democratic) 21.01%; ▌Joseph O. Kostner (Democratic) 20.71%; Others: ▌J. Louis Engdahl (Socialist) 1.92%; ▌Walter Huggins (Socialist) 1.88%; ▌Charles W. Williams (Prohibition) 0.37%; ▌Clay Freeman Gaumer (Prohibition) 0.36%; ▌Frank Hosking (Socialist Labor) 0.07%; ▌John Kowatzek (Socialist Labor) 0.07%

== Indiana ==
1916 Indiana's 5th congressional district election
- November 07, 1916
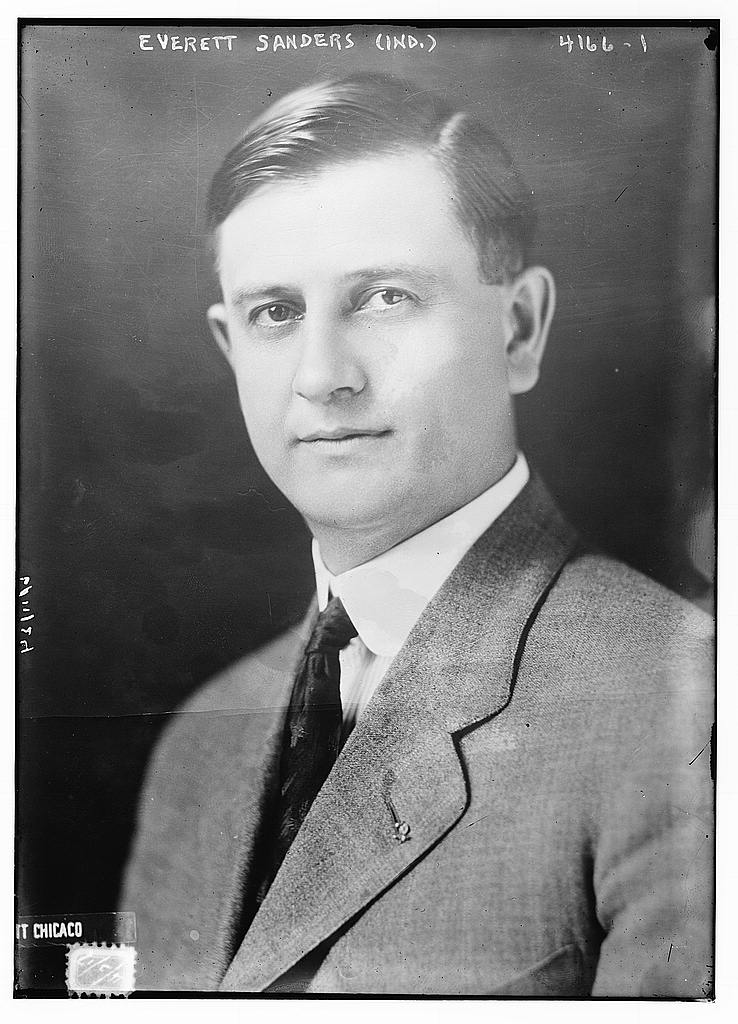

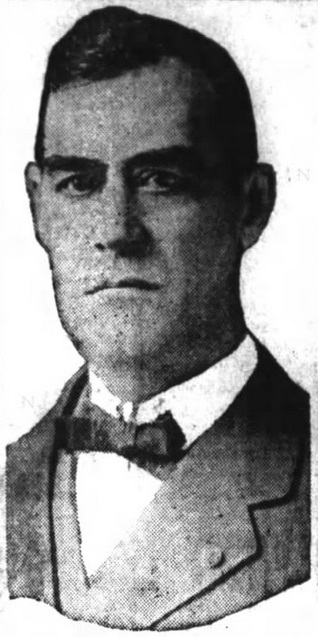

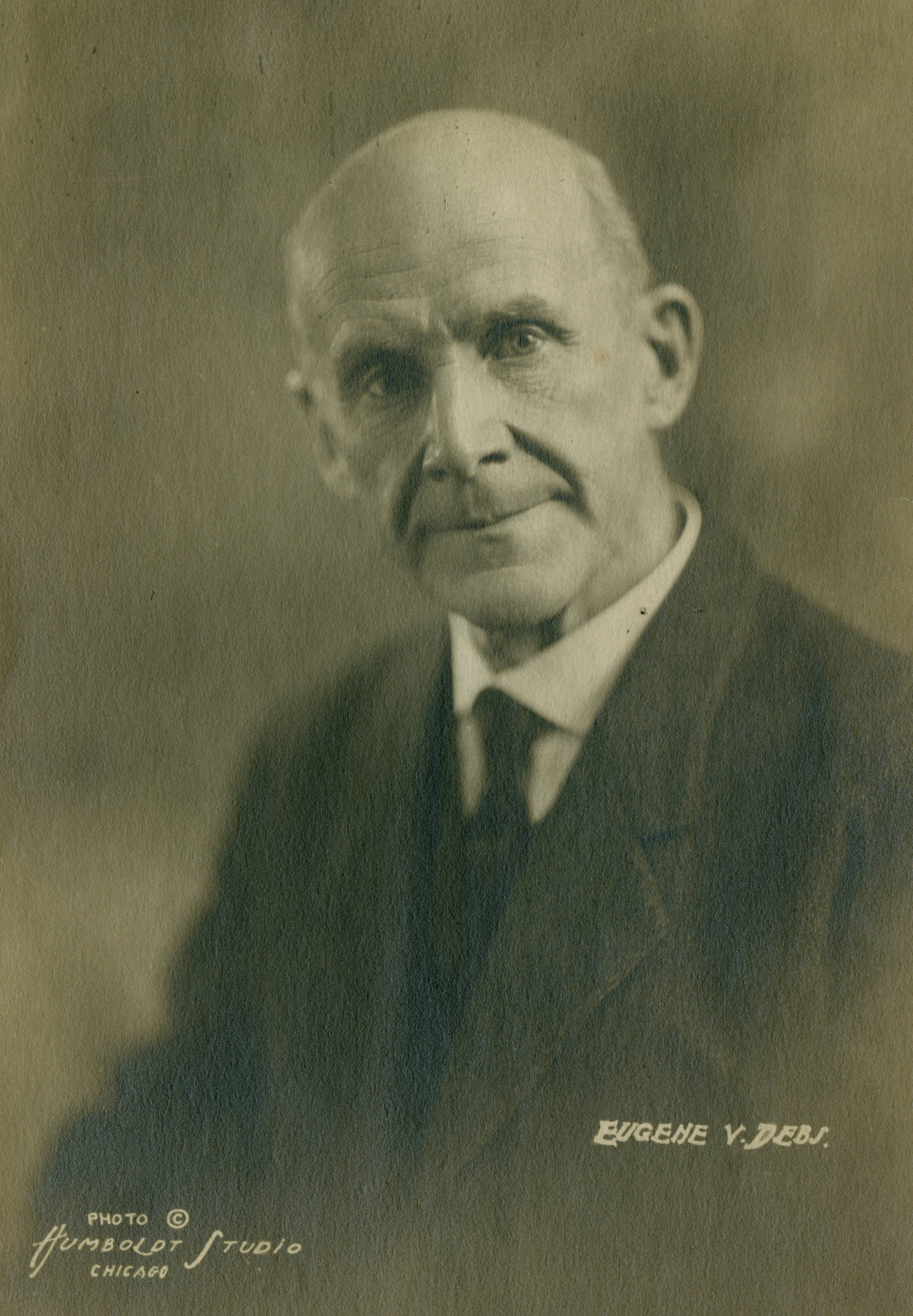
Nominee	Everett Sanders	Richard W. Moss	Eugene V. Debs
Party	Republican	Democratic	Socialist
Popular vote	20,977	20,270	8,866
Percentage	40.62%	39.25%	17.17%
- Sanders: 40–50% 50–60% Moss: 30–40% 40–50% Results by county
U.S. Representative before election
Richard W. Moss
Democratic
Elected U.S. Representative
Everett Sanders
Republican

Socialist Party performance in the District 5 election Debs: 0%-5% 5%-10% 10%-15% 15%-20% 20%-25%

District	Incumbent			This race	
District	Member	Party	First elected	Results	Candidates
Indiana 1	Charles Lieb	Democratic	1912	Incumbent retired. Democratic hold.	▌ ✓ George K. Denton (Democratic) 48.11%; ▌S. Wallace Cook (Republican) 47.44%; ▌Benjamin S. Reese (Prohibition) 2.57%; Others: ▌William Crecileus (Socialist) 1.29%; ▌William E. McElderry (Progressive) 0.59%
Indiana 2	William A. Cullop	Democratic	1908	Incumbent lost re-election. Republican gain.	▌ ✓ Oscar E. Bland (Republican) 47.34%; ▌William A. Cullop (Democratic) 45.42%; ▌Zimn M. Garten (Socialist) 5.47%; Others: ▌H. J. Beddinger (Prohibition) 1.19%; ▌Stephen A. Burton (Progressive) 0.58%
Indiana 3	William E. Cox	Democratic	1906	Incumbent re-elected.	▌ ✓ William E. Cox (Democratic) 52.09%; ▌John H. Edwards (Republican) 45.97%; Others: ▌Alice P. Oglie (Prohibition) 1.08%; ▌William D. Bartle (Socialist) 0.58%; ▌William Wagoner (Progressive) 0.28%
Indiana 4	Lincoln Dixon	Democratic	1904	Incumbent re-elected.	▌ ✓ Lincoln Dixon (Democratic) 51.50%; ▌Manley D. Wilson (Republican) 46.96%; Others: ▌Floyd N. Kissel (Progressive) 1.40%; ▌William Carmichael (Socialist) 0.14%
Indiana 5	Ralph W. Moss	Democratic	1908	Incumbent lost re-election. Republican gain.	▌ ✓ Everett Sanders (Republican) 40.62%; ▌Ralph W. Moss (Democratic) 39.25%; ▌Eugene V. Debs (Socialist) 17.17%; ▌Dayton F. Hanworth (Progressive) 2.97%
Indiana 6	Finly H. Gray	Democratic	1910	Incumbent lost re-election. Republican gain.	▌ ✓ Daniel W. Comstock (Republican) 48.61%; ▌Finly H. Gray (Democratic) 46.61%; ▌Ralph Gest (Prohibition) 2.44%; Others: ▌Cuthbert L. Simmerson (Socialist) 1.64%; ▌George R. Carter (Progressive) 0.70%
Indiana 7	Merrill Moores	Republican	1914	Incumbent re-elected.	▌ ✓ Merrill Moores (Republican) 51.83%; ▌Chalmer Schlosser (Democratic) 44.06%; ▌Joseph A. Leonard (Prohibition) 2.87%; Others: ▌Edward W. Clark (Socialist) 0.96%; ▌Edward F. Jones (Progressive) 0.29%
Indiana 8	John A. M. Adair	Democratic	1906	Incumbent retired to run for Governor of Indiana. Republican gain.	▌ ✓ Albert H. Vestal (Republican) 48.02%; ▌Jacob F. Denny (Democratic) 43.83%; ▌W. S. Whiting (Prohibition) 4.31%; ▌Fred S. Hurlburt (Socialist) 3.22%; ▌Carl W. Thompson (Progressive) 0.61%
Indiana 9	Martin A. Morrison	Democratic	1908	Incumbent retired. Republican gain.	▌ ✓ Fred S. Purnell (Republican) 50.35%; ▌David F. Maish (Democratic) 44.60%; ▌G. Stanley West (Progressive) 2.59%; ▌Jonathan C. Kahlenbeck (Socialist) 2.39%; ▌Johnathan W. Whicken (Prohibition) 0.08%
Indiana 10	William R. Wood	Republican	1914	Incumbent re-elected.	▌ ✓ William R. Wood (Republican) 56.85%; ▌George E. Hershman (Democratic) 41.13%; Others: ▌Isaac S. Wade (Socialist) 1.11%; ▌Jonathan G. Brown (Progressive) 0.84%; ▌Ervin S. Whitmen (Prohibition) 0.07%
Indiana 11	George W. Rauch	Democratic	1906	Incumbent lost re-election. Republican gain.	▌ ✓ Milton Kraus (Republican) 46.30%; ▌George W. Rauch (Democratic) 45.51%; ▌Layman H. Jachman (Progressive) 4.35%; ▌Walen J. Conarty (Prohibition) 3.84%
Indiana 12	Cyrus Cline	Democratic	1908	Incumbent lost re-election. Republican gain.	▌ ✓ Louis W. Fairfield (Republican) 51.19%; ▌Cyrus Cline (Democratic) 44.19%; ▌L. Lloyd Armstrong (Prohibition) 2.60%; ▌William O. Bailey (Progressive) 2.02%
Indiana 13	Henry A. Barnhart	Democratic	1908	Incumbent re-elected.	▌ ✓ Henry A. Barnhart (Democratic) 47.65%; ▌Andrew J. Hickey (Republican) 47.20%; ▌William C. Alexander (Socialist) 2.85%; ▌Jonathan M. Jolly (Progressive) 2.30%

== Iowa ==
District	Incumbent			This race	
District	Member	Party	First elected	Results	Candidates
Iowa 1	Charles A. Kennedy	Republican	1906	Incumbent re-elected.	▌ ✓ Charles A. Kennedy (Republican) 58.62%; ▌F. B. Whittaker (Democratic) 40.98%; ▌Lee W. Mix (Prohibition) 0.40%
Iowa 2	Harry E. Hull	Republican	1914	Incumbent re-elected.	▌ ✓ Harry E. Hull (Republican) 55.34%; ▌M. F. Cronin (Democratic) 40.27%; ▌J. B. Miller (Socialist) 3.72%; Others: ▌James McDowell (Progressive) 0.40%; ▌Otis W. Babcock (Prohibition) 0.28%
Iowa 3	Burton E. Sweet	Republican	1914	Incumbent re-elected.	▌ ✓ Burton E. Sweet (Republican) 66.95%; ▌James C. Murtagh (Democratic) 31.44%; Others: ▌Fred Splin (Socialist) 1.43%; ▌A. J. Adkins (Prohibition) 0.18%
Iowa 4	Gilbert N. Haugen	Republican	1898	Incumbent re-elected.	▌ ✓ Gilbert N. Haugen (Republican) 57.89%; ▌Earl Evans (Democratic) 40.77%; Others: ▌A. E. Bufkin (Socialist) 1.03%; ▌Frank Betzer (Prohibition) 0.32%
Iowa 5	James W. Good	Republican	1908	Incumbent re-elected.	▌ ✓ James W. Good (Republican) 64.08%; ▌Robert M. Peet (Democratic) 34.22%; Others: ▌Myron F. Wiltse (Socialist) 1.18%; ▌James W. Lee (Prohibition) 0.39%; ▌Lindley M. Osborne (Progressive) 0.14%
Iowa 6	C. William Ramseyer	Republican	1914	Incumbent re-elected.	▌ ✓ C. William Ramseyer (Republican) 57.27%; ▌Sanford Kirkpatrick (Democratic) 39.29%; ▌George W. Morrill (Socialist) 3.44%
Iowa 7	Cassius C. Dowell	Republican	1914	Incumbent re-elected.	▌ ✓ Cassius C. Dowell (Republican) 61.66%; ▌H. C. Evans (Democratic) 34.82%; ▌W. M. Whitenack (Socialist) 2.53%; ▌J. F. Steele (Progressive) 1.00%
Iowa 8	Horace M. Towner	Republican	1910	Incumbent re-elected.	▌ ✓ Horace M. Towner (Republican) 58.97%; ▌H. B. Bracewell (Democratic) 38.85%; ▌William James (Progressive) 2.17%
Iowa 9	William R. Green	Republican	1911	Incumbent re-elected.	▌ ✓ William R. Green (Republican) 55.39%; ▌John C. Pryor (Democratic) 44.28%; Others: ▌E. R. Mitchell (Prohibition) 0.22%; ▌J. Sizer (Progressive) 0.11%
Iowa 10	Frank P. Woods	Republican	1908	Incumbent re-elected.	▌ ✓ Frank P. Woods (Republican) 63.63%; ▌J. R. Files (Democratic) 34.04%; Others: ▌John Z. Hughes (Socialist) 1.43%; ▌A. B. Quarton (Progressive) 0.48%; ▌Charles F. Lusk (Prohibition) 0.42%
Iowa 11	Thomas J. Steele	Democratic	1914	Incumbent lost re-election. Republican gain.	▌ ✓ George Cromwell Scott (Republican) 49.64%; ▌Thomas J. Steele (Democratic) 49.39%; Others: ▌J. E. North (Socialist) 0.83%; ▌Edward H. Crane (Progressive) 0.15%

== Kansas ==
District	Incumbent			This race	
District	Member	Party	First elected	Results	Candidates
Kansas 1	Daniel R. Anthony Jr.	Republican	1907 (special)	Incumbent re-elected.	▌ ✓ Daniel R. Anthony Jr. (Republican) 55.75%; ▌Herbert J. Corwine (Democratic) 34.41%; ▌Eva Harding (Independent) 7.61%; ▌Charles A. Richardson (Socialist) 2.23%
Kansas 2	Joseph Taggart	Democratic	1911 (special)	Incumbent lost re-election. Republican gain.	▌ ✓ Edward C. Little (Republican) 50.38%; ▌Joseph Taggart (Democratic) 45.71%; ▌J. B. Stevens (Socialist) 3.92%
Kansas 3	Philip P. Campbell	Republican	1902	Incumbent re-elected.	▌ ✓ Philip P. Campbell (Republican) 47.80%; ▌William S. Hyatt (Democratic) 38.98%; ▌T. P. Laughlin (Socialist) 10.89%; ▌J. N. Chapman (Prohibition) 2.33%
Kansas 4	Dudley Doolittle	Democratic	1912	Incumbent re-elected.	▌ ✓ Dudley Doolittle (Democratic) 52.46%; ▌Clyde W. Miller (Republican) 47.01%; ▌E. B. Greene (Prohibition) 1.53%
Kansas 5	Guy T. Helvering	Democratic	1912	Incumbent re-elected.	▌ ✓ Guy T. Helvering (Democratic) 50.43%; ▌Charles M. Harger (Republican) 46.77%; ▌O. Van Osdol (Socialist) 2.79%
Kansas 6	John R. Connelly	Democratic	1912	Incumbent re-elected.	▌ ✓ John R. Connelly (Democratic) 56.46%; ▌Otis L. Benton (Republican) 39.99%; ▌A. Bennie (Socialist) 3.55%
Kansas 7	Jouett Shouse	Democratic	1914	Incumbent re-elected.	▌ ✓ Jouett Shouse (Democratic) 43.89%; ▌John S. Simmons (Republican) 36.43%; ▌Howard E. Kershner (Prohibition) 15.63%; ▌L. U. Keckler (Socialist) 4.05%
Kansas 8	William A. Ayres	Democratic	1914	Incumbent re-elected.	▌ ✓ William A. Ayres (Democratic) 50.99%; ▌Thomas C. Wilson (Republican) 45.76%; ▌J. Hayden Kershner (Prohibition) 3.25%

== Kentucky ==
District	Incumbent			This race	
District	Member	Party	First elected	Results	Candidates
Kentucky 1	Alben W. Barkley	Democratic	1912	Incumbent re-elected.	
Kentucky 2	David H. Kincheloe	Democratic	1914	Incumbent re-elected.	
Kentucky 3	Robert Y. Thomas Jr.	Democratic	1908	Incumbent re-elected.	
Kentucky 4	Ben Johnson	Democratic	1906	Incumbent re-elected.	
Kentucky 5	J. Swagar Sherley	Democratic	1902	Incumbent re-elected.	
Kentucky 6	Arthur B. Rouse	Democratic	1910	Incumbent re-elected.	
Kentucky 7	J. Campbell Cantrill	Democratic	1908	Incumbent re-elected.	
Kentucky 8	Harvey Helm	Democratic	1906	Incumbent re-elected.	
Kentucky 9	William J. Fields	Democratic	1910	Incumbent re-elected.	
Kentucky 10	John W. Langley	Republican	1906	Incumbent re-elected.	
Kentucky 11	Caleb Powers	Republican	1910	Incumbent re-elected.	

== Louisiana ==
District	Incumbent			This race	
District	Member	Party	First elected	Results	Candidates
Louisiana 1	Albert Estopinal	Democratic	1908	Incumbent re-elected.	
Louisiana 2	H. Garland Dupré	Democratic	1910	Incumbent re-elected.	
Louisiana 3	Whitmell P. Martin	Progressive	1914	Incumbent re-elected.	
Louisiana 4	John T. Watkins	Democratic	1904	Incumbent re-elected.	
Louisiana 5	Riley J. Wilson	Democratic	1914	Incumbent re-elected.	
Louisiana 6	Lewis L. Morgan	Democratic	1912	Incumbent re-elected.	
Louisiana 7	Ladislas Lazaro	Democratic	1912	Incumbent re-elected.	
Louisiana 8	James Benjamin Aswell	Democratic	1912	Incumbent re-elected.	

== Maine ==
District	Incumbent			This race	
District	Member	Party	First elected	Results	Candidates
Maine 1	Asher Hinds	Republican	1910	Incumbent retired. Republican hold.	▌ ✓ Louis B. Goodall (Republican)
Maine 2	Daniel J. McGillicuddy	Democratic	1910	Incumbent lost re-election. Republican gain.	▌ ✓ Wallace H. White (Republican) ▌ Daniel J. McGillicuddy (Democratic)
Maine 3	John A. Peters	Republican	1912 (special)	Incumbent re-elected.	▌ ✓ John A. Peters (Republican)
Maine 4	Frank E. Guernsey	Republican	1908 (special)	Incumbent retired to run for U.S. senator. Republican hold.	▌ ✓ Ira G. Hersey (Republican)

== Maryland ==
District	Incumbent			This race	
District	Member	Party	First elected	Results	Candidates
Maryland 1	Jesse Price	Democratic	1914	Incumbent re-elected.	▌ ✓ Jesse Price (Democratic) 48.6%; ▌Robert F. Duer (Republican) 48.4%; ▌James T. Anthony (Prohibition) 3.0%
Maryland 2	J. Frederick C. Talbott	Democratic	1902	Incumbent re-elected.	▌ ✓ J. Frederick C. Talbott (Democratic) 50.5%; ▌William H. Lawrence (Republican) 41.5%; ▌John S. Green (Prohibition) 7.1%; ▌William H. Champlin (Socialist) 0.9%
Maryland 3	Charles Pearce Coady	Democratic	1913 (special)	Incumbent re-elected.	▌ ✓ Charles Pearce Coady (Democratic) 52.5%; ▌Charles W. Main (Republican) 45.0%; ▌Ferdinand Bracklein (Socialist) 2.3%; ▌Harry S. Johnson (Prohibition) 1.1%
Maryland 4	J. Charles Linthicum	Democratic	1910	Incumbent re-elected.	▌ ✓ J. Charles Linthicum (Democratic) 52.5%; ▌J. Frank Fox (Republican) 45.2%; Others: ▌Daniel Shipley (Prohibition) 1.3%; ▌Franklin F. Warthen (Socialist) 1.1%
Maryland 5	Sydney Emanuel Mudd II	Republican	1914	Incumbent re-elected.	▌ ✓ Sydney Emanuel Mudd II (Republican) 53.9%; ▌Jackson H. Ralston (Democratic) 43.0%; Others: ▌James L. Smiley (Socialist) 1.7%; ▌John E. Wetherald (Prohibition) 1.4%
Maryland 6	David John Lewis	Democratic	1910	Incumbent retired to run for U.S. Senator. Republican gain.	▌ ✓ Frederick N. Zihlman (Republican) 51.1%; ▌Henry Dorsey Etchison (Democratic) 44.1%; ▌Ross V. Ayres (Socialist) 2.7%; ▌Wiliam A. Walker (Prohibition) 2.1%

== Massachusetts ==
District	Incumbent			This race	
District	Member	Party	First elected	Results	Candidates
Massachusetts 1	Allen T. Treadway	Republican	1912	Incumbent re-elected.	▌ ✓ Allen T. Treadway (Republican) 60.16%; ▌Timothy C. Childs (Democratic) 36.08%; ▌Walter S. Hutchins (Socialist) 3.75%
Massachusetts 2	Frederick H. Gillett	Republican	1892	Incumbent re-elected.	▌ ✓ Frederick H. Gillett (Republican) 60.25%; ▌Theobald M. Connor (Democratic) 35.72%; ▌George W. Wrenn (Socialist) 4.03%
Massachusetts 3	Calvin Paige	Republican	1914	Incumbent re-elected.	▌ ✓ Calvin Paige (Republican) 66.17%; ▌Michael A. Scanlon (Democratic) 33.83%
Massachusetts 4	Samuel Winslow	Republican	1912	Incumbent re-elected.	▌ ✓ Samuel Winslow (Republican) 55.56%; ▌John H. Hunt (Democratic) 41.92%; ▌Richard D. Murphy (Prohibition) 2.53%
Massachusetts 5	John Jacob Rogers	Republican	1912	Incumbent re-elected.	▌ ✓ John Jacob Rogers (Republican) 64.71%; ▌Roger S. Hoar (Democratic) 35.29%
Massachusetts 6	Augustus P. Gardner	Republican	1902	Incumbent re-elected.	▌ ✓ Augustus P. Gardner (Republican) 67.34%; ▌Arthur Howard (Democratic) 26.36%; ▌Charles W. Fitzgerald (Socialist) 6.30%
Massachusetts 7	Michael Francis Phelan	Democratic	1912	Incumbent re-elected.	▌ ✓ Michael Francis Phelan (Democratic) 51.11%; ▌Charles N. Barney (Republican) 44.32%; ▌Samuel Branhall (Socialist) 3.32%; ▌Freeman H. Newhall (Prohibition) 1.25%
Massachusetts 8	Frederick W. Dallinger	Republican	1914	Incumbent re-elected.	▌ ✓ Frederick W. Dallinger (Republican) 59.68%; ▌Frederick S. Deitrick (Democratic) 40.32%
Massachusetts 9	Ernest W. Roberts	Republican	1912	Incumbent lost re-election. Independent gain.	▌ ✓ Alvan T. Fuller (Independent) 50.46%; ▌Ernest W. Roberts (Republican) 49.54%
Massachusetts 10	Peter Tague	Democratic	1914	Incumbent re-elected.	▌ ✓ Peter Tague (Democratic) 78.74%; ▌James L. Hourihan (Republican) 21.26%
Massachusetts 11	George H. Tinkham	Republican	1914	Incumbent re-elected.	▌ ✓ George H. Tinkham (Republican) 60.08%; ▌Francis J. Hogan (Democratic) 39.92%
Massachusetts 12	James A. Gallivan	Democratic	1914	Incumbent re-elected.	▌ ✓ James A. Gallivan (Democratic) 67.57%; ▌Charles H. Robinson (Republican) 32.44%
Massachusetts 13	William Henry Carter	Republican	1914	Incumbent re-elected.	▌ ✓ William Henry Carter (Republican) 66.28%; ▌William H. Murphy (Democratic) 33.72%
Massachusetts 14	Richard Olney II	Democratic	1914	Incumbent re-elected.	▌ ✓ Richard Olney II (Democratic) 53.17%; ▌Henry L. Kincaide (Republican) 43.36%; ▌John McCarty (Socialist) 3.48%
Massachusetts 15	William S. Greene	Republican	1898	Incumbent re-elected.	▌ ✓ William S. Greene (Republican) 63.18%; ▌Arthur J. B. Cartier (Democratic) 36.83%
Massachusetts 16	Joseph Walsh	Republican	1914	Incumbent re-elected.	▌ ✓ Joseph Walsh (Republican) 68.80%; ▌Ralph W. Crosby (Democratic) 31.20%

== Michigan ==
District	Incumbent			This race	
District	Member	Party	First elected	Results	Candidates
Michigan 1	Frank E. Doremus	Democratic	1910	Incumbent re-elected.	▌ ✓ Frank E. Doremus (Democratic)
Michigan 2	Samuel Beakes	Democratic	1912	Incumbent lost re-election. Republican gain.	▌ ✓ Mark R. Bacon (Republican) ▌ Samuel Beakes (Democratic)
Michigan 2	Samuel Beakes	Democratic	1912	Election successfully contested. Incumbent re-seated December 13, 1917. Democratic hold.	▌ ✓ Samuel Beakes (Democratic); ▌ Mark R. Bacon (Republican)
Michigan 3	John M. C. Smith	Republican	1910	Incumbent re-elected.	▌ ✓ John M. C. Smith (Republican)
Michigan 4	Edward L. Hamilton	Republican	1896	Incumbent re-elected.	▌ ✓ Edward L. Hamilton (Republican)
Michigan 5	Carl E. Mapes	Republican	1912	Incumbent re-elected.	▌ ✓ Carl E. Mapes (Republican)
Michigan 6	Patrick H. Kelley	Republican	1912	Incumbent re-elected.	▌ ✓ Patrick H. Kelley (Republican)
Michigan 7	Louis C. Cramton	Republican	1912	Incumbent re-elected.	▌ ✓ Louis C. Cramton (Republican)
Michigan 8	Joseph W. Fordney	Republican	1898	Incumbent re-elected.	▌ ✓ Joseph W. Fordney (Republican)
Michigan 9	James C. McLaughlin	Republican	1906	Incumbent re-elected.	▌ ✓ James C. McLaughlin (Republican)
Michigan 10	George A. Loud	Republican	1902; 1912 (lost); 1914	Incumbent lost renomination. Republican hold.	▌ ✓ Gilbert A. Currie (Republican)
Michigan 11	Frank D. Scott	Republican	1914	Incumbent re-elected.	▌ ✓ Frank D. Scott (Republican)
Michigan 12	W. Frank James	Republican	1914	Incumbent re-elected.	▌ ✓ W. Frank James (Republican)
Michigan 13	Charles Archibald Nichols	Republican	1914	Incumbent re-elected.	▌ ✓ Charles Archibald Nichols (Republican)

== Minnesota ==
District	Incumbent			This race	
District	Member	Party	First elected	Results	Candidates
Minnesota 1	Sydney Anderson	Republican	1910	Incumbent re-elected.	▌ ✓ Sydney Anderson (Republican) 65.5%; ▌Henry M. Lamberton (Democratic) 34.5%
Minnesota 2	Franklin Ellsworth	Republican	1914	Incumbent re-elected.	▌ ✓ Franklin Ellsworth (Republican) 100%
Minnesota 3	Charles R. Davis	Republican	1902	Incumbent re-elected.	▌ ✓ Charles R. Davis (Republican) 71.1%; ▌Edward F. Kelly (Democratic) 28.9%
Minnesota 4	Carl Van Dyke	Democratic	1914	Incumbent re-elected.	▌ ✓ Carl Van Dyke (Democratic) 61.2%; ▌Darius F. Reese (Republican) 30.6%; ▌Hermon Phillips (Socialist) 4.8%; ▌Hjalmar O. Petersen (Prohibition) 1.7%
Minnesota 5	George R. Smith	Republican	1912	Incumbent lost renomination. Republican hold.	▌ ✓ Ernest Lundeen (Republican) 42.4%; ▌Madison C. Bowler (Democratic) 26.3%; ▌Thomas Latimer (Socialist) 16.7%; ▌Arthur L. Markve (Prohibition) 14.6%
Minnesota 6	Charles A. Lindbergh	Republican	1906	Incumbent retired to run for U.S. senator. Republican hold.	▌ ✓ Harold Knutson (Republican) 56.8%; ▌William F. Donohue (Democratic) 35.7%; ▌John Knutsen (Prohibition) 7.5%
Minnesota 7	Andrew Volstead	Republican	1902	Incumbent re-elected.	▌ ✓ Andrew Volstead (Republican) 53.5%; ▌Engebret E. Lobeck (Prohibition) 30.1%; ▌Irve Townsend (Democratic) 16.4%
Minnesota 8	Clarence B. Miller	Republican	1908	Incumbent re-elected.	▌ ✓ Clarence B. Miller (Republican) 51.6%; ▌Juls J. Anderson (Socialist) 26.3%; ▌Bert N. Wheeler (Prohibition) 22.1%
Minnesota 9	Halvor Steenerson	Republican	1902	Incumbent re-elected.	▌ ✓ Halvor Steenerson (Republican) 66.8%; ▌Carl Swanson (Democratic) 21.8%; ▌Timothy A. Thompson (Socialist) 11.4%
Minnesota 10	Thomas D. Schall	Progressive	1914	Incumbent re-elected, then joined Republicans. Republican gain.	▌ ✓ Thomas D. Schall (Progressive) 45.0%; ▌Lowell E. Jepson (Republican) 30.1%; ▌Neil Cronin (Democratic) 16.3%; ▌John Gabriel Soltis (Socialist) 8.6%

== Mississippi ==
District	Incumbent			This race	
District	Member	Party	First elected	Results	Candidates
Mississippi 1	Ezekiel S. Candler Jr.	Democratic	1900	Incumbent re-elected.	▌ ✓ Ezekiel S. Candler Jr. (Democratic) 100%
Mississippi 2	Hubert D. Stephens	Democratic	1910	Incumbent re-elected.	▌ ✓ Hubert D. Stephens (Democratic) 97.56%; ▌J. G. Adams (Socialist) 2.44%
Mississippi 3	Benjamin G. Humphreys II	Democratic	1902	Incumbent re-elected.	▌ ✓ Benjamin G. Humphreys II (Democratic) 100%
Mississippi 4	Thomas U. Sisson	Democratic	1908	Incumbent re-elected.	▌ ✓ Thomas U. Sisson (Democratic) 100%
Mississippi 5	William W. Venable	Democratic	1916 (special)	Incumbent re-elected.	▌ ✓ William W. Venable (Democratic) 94.62%; ▌C. C Evans (Socialist) 5.38%
Mississippi 6	Pat Harrison	Democratic	1910	Incumbent re-elected.	▌ ✓ Pat Harrison (Democratic) 94.65%; ▌F. T. Maxwell (Socialist) 5.35%%
Mississippi 7	Percy Quin	Democratic	1912	Incumbent re-elected.	▌ ✓ Percy Quin (Democratic) 100%
Mississippi 8	James Collier	Democratic	1908	Incumbent re-elected.	▌ ✓ James Collier (Democratic) 97.56%; ▌R. N. Smith (Unknown) 2.44%

== Missouri ==
District	Incumbent			This race	
District	Member	Party	First elected	Results	Candidates
Missouri 1	James T. Lloyd	Democratic	1897 (special)	Incumbent retired. Democratic hold.	▌ ✓ Milton A. Romjue (Democratic) 54.38%; ▌Edward S. Brown (Republican) 44.20%; ▌M. L. Ferguson (Socialist) 1.42%
Missouri 2	William W. Rucker	Democratic	1898	Incumbent re-elected.	▌ ✓ William W. Rucker (Democratic) 57.72%; ▌O. A. Pickett (Republican) 41.47%; ▌Edwin A. Hill (Socialist) 0.82%
Missouri 3	Joshua W. Alexander	Democratic	1906	Incumbent re-elected.	▌ ✓ Joshua W. Alexander (Democratic) 54.22%; ▌Levi T. Moulton (Republican) 44.49%; Others: ▌Julius C. Hughes (Prohibition) 0.75%; ▌George Miller (Socialist) 0.55%
Missouri 4	Charles F. Booher	Democratic	1906	Incumbent re-elected.	▌ ✓ Charles F. Booher (Democratic) 53.58%; ▌Jacob Geiger (Republican) 45.06%; Others: ▌Joseph Kunzelman (Socialist) 0.84%; ▌A. B. Wray (Prohibition) 0.51%
Missouri 5	William P. Borland	Democratic	1908	Incumbent re-elected.	▌ ✓ William P. Borland (Democratic) 58.68%; ▌Isaac B. Kimbrell (Republican) 39.86%; Others: ▌Edward D. Wilcox (Socialist) 1.35%; ▌Karl Oberheu (Socialist Labor) 0.11%
Missouri 6	Clement C. Dickinson	Democratic	1910 (special)	Incumbent re-elected.	▌ ✓ Clement C. Dickinson (Democratic) 54.20%; ▌R. O. Crawford (Republican) 45.81%
Missouri 7	Courtney W. Hamlin	Democratic	1906	Incumbent re-elected.	▌ ✓ Courtney W. Hamlin (Democratic) 50.47%; ▌Sherman P. Houston (Republican) 48.94%; ▌Samuel H. McElvain (Prohibition) 0.59%
Missouri 8	Dorsey W. Shackleford	Democratic	1899 (special)	Incumbent re-elected.	▌ ✓ Dorsey W. Shackleford (Democratic) 51.99%; ▌North Todd Gentry (Republican) 48.02%
Missouri 9	Champ Clark	Democratic	1892; 1894 (lost); 1896	Incumbent re-elected.	▌ ✓ Champ Clark (Democratic)
Missouri 10	Jacob Edwin Meeker	Republican	1914	Incumbent re-elected.	▌ ✓ Jacob Edwin Meeker (Republican)
Missouri 11	William L. Igoe	Democratic	1912	Incumbent re-elected.	▌ ✓ William L. Igoe (Democratic)
Missouri 12	Leonidas C. Dyer	Republican	1910; 1912 (lost); 1914	Incumbent re-elected.	▌ ✓ Leonidas C. Dyer (Republican)
Missouri 13	Walter Lewis Hensley	Democratic	1910	Incumbent re-elected.	▌ ✓ Walter Lewis Hensley (Democratic)
Missouri 14	Joseph J. Russell	Democratic	1910	Incumbent re-elected.	▌ ✓ Joseph J. Russell (Democratic)
Missouri 15	Perl D. Decker	Democratic	1912	Incumbent re-elected.	▌ ✓ Perl D. Decker (Democratic)
Missouri 16	Thomas L. Rubey	Democratic	1910	Incumbent re-elected.	▌ ✓ Thomas L. Rubey (Democratic)

== Montana ==
This was the last time Montana used an at-large district until its representation was reduced to one in 1992. This was also the first time a woman was elected to Congress.

District	Incumbent			This race	
District	Member	Party	First elected	Results	Candidates
Montana at-large 2 seats on a general ticket	John M. Evans	Democratic	1912	Incumbent re-elected.	▌ ✓ John M. Evans (Democratic) 26.7%; ▌ ✓ Jeannette Rankin (Republican) 24.3%; ▌Harry B. Mitchell (Democratic) 22.3%; ▌George W. Farr (Republican) 21.2%; ▌John McGuffey (Socialist) 2.8%; ▌Albert F. Meissner (Socialist) 2.7%
Montana at-large 2 seats on a general ticket	Tom Stout	Democratic	1912	Incumbent retired. Republican gain.	▌ ✓ John M. Evans (Democratic) 26.7%; ▌ ✓ Jeannette Rankin (Republican) 24.3%; ▌Harry B. Mitchell (Democratic) 22.3%; ▌George W. Farr (Republican) 21.2%; ▌John McGuffey (Socialist) 2.8%; ▌Albert F. Meissner (Socialist) 2.7%

== Nebraska ==
District	Incumbent			This race	
District	Member	Party	First elected	Results	Candidates
Nebraska 1	C. Frank Reavis	Republican	1914	Incumbent re-elected.	▌ ✓ C. Frank Reavis (Republican) 54.45%; ▌John A. Maguire (Democratic) 43.76%; ▌Glen H. Abel (Socialist) 1.80%
Nebraska 2	Charles O. Lobeck	Democratic	1910	Incumbent re-elected.	▌ ✓ Charles O. Lobeck (Democratic) 55.55%; ▌Benjamin S. Baker (Republican) 38.12%; ▌G. C. Porter (Socialist) 6.34%
Nebraska 3	Dan V. Stephens	Democratic	1911 (special)	Incumbent re-elected.	▌ ✓ Dan V. Stephens (Democratic) 51.63%; ▌William P. Warner (Republican) 47.00%; ▌James M. Woodcock (Socialist) 1.38%
Nebraska 4	Charles H. Sloan	Republican	1910	Incumbent re-elected.	▌ ✓ Charles H. Sloan (Republican) 55.26%; ▌William L. Stark (Democratic) 43.18%; ▌John Itner (Socialist) 1.56%
Nebraska 5	Ashton C. Shallenberger	Democratic	1914	Incumbent re-elected.	▌ ✓ Ashton C. Shallenberger (Democratic) 53.96%; ▌Silas R. Barton (Republican) 43.51%; ▌W. C. Elliott (Socialist) 2.53%
Nebraska 6	Moses Kinkaid	Republican	1902	Incumbent re-elected.	▌ ✓ Moses Kinkaid (Republican) 57.35%; ▌Ed B. McDermott (Democratic) 38.14%; ▌John Canright (Socialist) 3.71%; ▌Lucien Stebbins (Independent) 0.81%

== Nevada ==
District	Incumbent			This race	
District	Member	Party	First elected	Results	Candidates
Nevada at-large	Edwin E. Roberts	Republican	1910	Incumbent re-elected.	▌ ✓ Edwin E. Roberts (Republican) 43.6%; ▌Edwin E. Caine (Democratic) 40.5%; ▌Martin J. Scanlan (Socialist) 15.9%

== New Hampshire ==
District	Incumbent			This race	
District	Member	Party	First elected	Results	Candidates
New Hampshire 1	Cyrus A. Sulloway	Republican	1914	Incumbent re-elected.	▌ ✓ Cyrus A. Sulloway (Republican) 51.52%; ▌Gordon Woodbury (Democratic) 46.75%; ▌Lorenz Kierdof (Socialist) 1.40%; ▌Elijah Newell (Prohibition) 0.34%
New Hampshire 2	Edward Hills Wason	Republican	1914	Incumbent re-elected.	▌ ✓ Edward Hills Wason (Republican) 51.72%; ▌Raymond B. Stevens (Democratic) 46.67%; ▌Ernest Kunberger (Socialist) 1.32%; ▌Arthur B. Simonds (Prohibition) 0.29%

== New Jersey ==
District	Incumbent			This race	
District	Member	Party	First elected	Results	Candidates
New Jersey 1	William J. Browning	Republican	1911 (special)	Incumbent re-elected.	▌ ✓ William J. Browning (Republican)
New Jersey 2	Isaac Bacharach	Republican	1914	Incumbent re-elected.	▌ ✓ Isaac Bacharach (Republican)
New Jersey 3	Thomas J. Scully	Democratic	1910	Incumbent re-elected.	▌ ✓ Thomas J. Scully (Democratic)
New Jersey 4	Elijah C. Hutchinson	Republican	1914	Incumbent re-elected.	▌ ✓ Elijah C. Hutchinson (Republican)
New Jersey 5	John H. Capstick	Republican	1914	Incumbent re-elected.	▌ ✓ John H. Capstick (Republican)
New Jersey 6	Archibald C. Hart	Democratic	1912 (special); 1912 (lost); 1914	Incumbent retired. Republican gain.	▌ ✓ John R. Ramsey (Republican)
New Jersey 7	Dow H. Drukker	Republican	1914 (special)	Incumbent re-elected.	▌ ✓ Dow H. Drukker (Republican)
New Jersey 8	Edward W. Gray	Republican	1914	Incumbent re-elected.	▌ ✓ Edward W. Gray (Republican)
New Jersey 9	Richard W. Parker	Republican	1894; 1910 (lost); 1914 (special)	Incumbent re-elected.	▌ ✓ Richard W. Parker (Republican)
New Jersey 10	Frederick R. Lehlbach	Republican	1914	Incumbent re-elected.	▌ ✓ Frederick R. Lehlbach (Republican)
New Jersey 11	John J. Eagan	Democratic	1912	Incumbent re-elected.	▌ ✓ John J. Eagan (Democratic)
New Jersey 12	James A. Hamill	Democratic	1906	Incumbent re-elected.	▌ ✓ James A. Hamill (Democratic)

== New Mexico ==
District	Incumbent			This race	
District	Member	Party	First elected	Results	Candidates
New Mexico at-large	Benigno C. Hernández	Republican	1914	Incumbent lost re-election. Democratic gain.	▌ ✓ William B. Walton (Democratic) 48.88%; ▌Benigno C. Hernández (Republican) 48.05%; ▌Andrew J. Eggum (Socialist) 3.07%

== New York ==
District	Incumbent			This race	
District	Member	Party	First elected	Results	Candidates
New York 1	Frederick C. Hicks	Republican	1914	Incumbent re-elected.	▌ ✓ Frederick C. Hicks (Republican) 63.2%; ▌Lathrop Brown (Democratic) 35.48%; Others: ▌Rudy J. Brossman (Socialist) 0.79%; ▌John A. Duryea (Prohibition) 0.53%
New York 2	C. Pope Caldwell	Democratic	1914	Incumbent re-elected.	▌ ✓ C. Pope Caldwell (Democratic) 51.83%; ▌Theron H. Burden (Republican) 41.93%; ▌Benjamin Katz (Socialist) 5.61%; Others: ▌Charles H. Georgi (Progressive) 0.4%; ▌P.A. Blauderoth (Prohibition) 0.23%
New York 3	Joseph V. Flynn	Democratic	1914	Incumbent re-elected.	▌ ✓ C. Pope Caldwell (Democratic) 49.3%; ▌Jared J. Chambers (Republican) 43.85%; ▌William A. Ross (Socialist) 6.56%; ▌Frederick A. Oakley (Prohibition) 0.3%
New York 4	Harry H. Dale	Democratic	1912	Incumbent re-elected.	▌ ✓ Harry H. Dale (Democratic) 48.18%; ▌Michael Stein (Republican) 38.3%; ▌Richard Haffner (Socialist) 13.33%; ▌Reuben S. Goodell (Prohibition) 0.2%
New York 5	James P. Maher	Democratic	1910	Incumbent re-elected.	▌ ✓ James P. Maher (Democratic) 49.91%; ▌Charles W. Philipbar (Republican) 44.41%; ▌Hans A. Hansen (Socialist) 5.35%; ▌Oscar Christiansen (Prohibition) 0.33%
New York 6	Frederick W. Rowe	Republican	1914	Incumbent re-elected.	▌ ✓ Frederick W. Rowe (Republican) 60.7%; ▌Charles I. Stengle (Democratic) 36.36%; ▌Alexander Fichandler (Socialist) 2.55%; ▌William H. Hoole (Prohibition) 0.4%
New York 7	John J. Fitzgerald	Democratic	1898	Incumbent re-elected.	▌ ✓ John J. Fitzgerald (Democratic) 63.47%; ▌Ralph Waldo Bowman (Republican) 34.21%; Others: ▌Alexander Fraser (Socialist) 1.86%; ▌John McKee (Prohibition) 0.46%
New York 8	Daniel J. Griffin	Democratic	1912	Incumbent re-elected	▌ ✓ Daniel J. Griffin (Democratic) 60.74%; ▌Wilmot L. Morehouse (Republican) 35.59%; ▌Joso Jeips (Socialist) 3.2%; ▌John J. McDonald (Prohibition) 0.47%
New York 9	Oscar W. Swift	Republican	1914	Incumbent re-elected.	▌ ✓ Oscar W. Swift (Republican) 57%; ▌Herman H. Torborg (Democratic) 36.76%; ▌Ludwig Lore (Socialist) 6.24%
New York 10	Reuben L. Haskell	Republican	1914	Incumbent re-elected.	▌ ✓ Reuben L. Haskell (Republican) 45.02%; ▌Frank Wasserman (Democratic) 36.05%; ▌William M. Feigenbaum (Socialist) 18.6%; ▌Henry A. Roberts (Prohibition) 0.33%
New York 11	Daniel J. Riordan	Democratic	1906 (special)	Incumbent re-elected.	▌ ✓ Daniel J. Riordan (Democratic) 56.21%; ▌Montague Lessler (Republican) 41.08%; Others: ▌Samuel P. Kramer (Socialist) 1.98%; ▌Hiram C. Horton (Prohibition) 0.73%
New York 12	Meyer London	Socialist	1914	Incumbent re-elected.	▌ ✓ Meyer London (Socialist) 47.42%; ▌Leon Sanders (Democratic) 44.78%; ▌Louis M. Block (Republican) 7.52%; Others: ▌Timothy N. Holden (Prohibition) 0.14%; ▌Solomon Sufrin (Progressive) 0.13%
New York 13	George W. Loft	Democratic	1913 (special)	Incumbent retired. Democratic hold.	▌ ✓ Christopher D. Sullivan (Democratic) 48.11%; ▌Frank Dostal (Republican) 36.27%; ▌Hilda G. Claessens (Socialist) 15.46%; ▌James F. Gillespie (Prohibition) 0.16%
New York 14	Michael F. Farley	Democratic	1914	Incumbent lost re-election. Republican gain.	▌ ✓ Fiorello La Guardia (Republican) 43.28%; ▌Michael F. Farley (Democratic) 41.15%; ▌William I. Sockheim (Socialist) 15.09%; ▌Samuel Fishman (Prohibition) 0.48%
New York 15	Michael F. Conry	Democratic	1908	Incumbent re-elected.	▌ ✓ Michael F. Conry (Democratic) 59.88%; ▌William Henkel (Republican) 35.83%; ▌Emmet O'Reilly (Socialist) 3.45%; Others: ▌Nathan Block (Progressive) 0.47%; ▌James E. Mitchell (Prohibition) 0.36%
New York 16	Peter J. Dooling	Democratic	1912	Incumbent re-elected.	▌ ✓ Peter J. Dooling (Democratic) 51.73%; ▌Walbridge S. Taft (Republican) 45.95%; ▌Jeremiah C. Frost (Socialist) 2.14%; ▌William Henkel (American) 0.17%
New York 17	John F. Carew	Democratic	1912	Incumbent re-elected	▌ ✓ John F. Carew (Democratic) 51.16%; ▌Lindell T. Bates (Republican) 44.55%; ▌Adele Seltzer (Socialist) 4.06%; ▌Alfred H. Saunders (Prohibition) 0.22%
New York 18	Thomas G. Patten	Democratic	1910	Incumbent lost re-election. Republican gain.	▌ ✓ George B. Francis (Republican) 46.06%; ▌Thomas G. Patten (Democratic) 44.66%; ▌Irving Ottenberg (Socialist) 9.09%; ▌Howard G. Myers (Prohibition) 0.19%
New York 19	Walter M. Chandler	Progressive	1912	Incumbent re-elected as a Republican. Republican gain.	▌ ✓ Walter M. Chandler (Republican) 54.8%; ▌Michael Schaap (Democratic) 40.76%; ▌Leon A. Malkiel (Socialist) 4.16%; ▌Volney B. Cushing (Prohibition) 0.28%
New York 20	Isaac Siegel	Republican	1914	Incumbent re-elected.	▌ ✓ Isaac Siegel (Republican) 36.11%; ▌Morris Hillquit (Socialist) 32.83%; ▌Bernard Rosenblatt (Democratic) 31.06%; ▌Albert T. Hull (Prohibition)
New York 21	G. Murray Hulbert	Democratic	1914	Incumbent re-elected.	▌ ✓ G. Murray Hulbert (Democratic) 53.13%; ▌Martin C. Ansorge (Republican) 41.25%; ▌Alexander Braunstein (Socialist) 5.4%; ▌Charles H. Simmons (Prohibition) 0.22%
New York 22	Henry Bruckner	Democratic	1912	Incumbent re-elected.	▌ ✓ Henry Bruckner (Democratic) 63.54%; ▌James A. Francis (Republican) 29.49%; ▌Max B. Gullan (Socialist) 6.7%; ▌John Johnson (Prohibition) 0.27%
New York 23	William S. Bennet	Republican	1915 (special)	Incumbent lost re-election. Democratic gain.	▌ ✓ Daniel C. Oliver (Democratic) 46.87%; ▌William S. Bennet (Republican) 41.95%; ▌I. George Dobsevage (Socialist) 10.66%; ▌Richard Granville Green (Prohibition) 0.52%
New York 24	Woodson R. Oglesby	Democratic	1912	Incumbent lost re-election. Republican gain.	▌ ✓ Benjamin L. Fairchild (Republican) 53.72%; ▌Woodson R. Oglesby (Democratic) 38.53%; ▌Mary G. Schonberg (Socialist) 7.75%
New York 25	James W. Husted	Republican	1914	Incumbent re-elected.	▌ ✓ James W. Husted (Republican) 59.48%; ▌Chester D. Pugsley (Democratic) 37.72%; Others: ▌Herman Kobbe (Socialist) 1.46%; ▌Levi W. Parent (Prohibition) 1.33%
New York 26	Edmund Platt	Republican	1912	Incumbent re-elected.	▌ ✓ Edmund Platt (Republican) 54.18%; ▌Rosslyn M. Cox (Democratic) 43.75%; Others: ▌William C. Ramsdell (Prohibition) 1.1%; ▌Harry Schefer (Socialist) 0.98%
New York 27	Charles B. Ward	Republican	1914	Incumbent re-elected.	▌ ✓ Charles B. Ward (Republican) 56.43%; ▌James O. Woodward (Democratic) 40.49%; ▌Edward A. Smiley (Prohibition) 2.23%; ▌Samuel J. Minkler (Socialist) 0.85%
New York 28	Rollin B. Sanford	Republican	1914	Incumbent re-elected.	▌ ✓ Rollin B. Sanford (Republican) 55.49%; ▌Michael F. Collins (Democratic) 42.91%; Others: ▌Allin Depew (Socialist) 1.02%; ▌John Chaloux (Prohibition) 0.59%
New York 29	James S. Parker	Republican	1912	Incumbent re-elected.	▌ ✓ James S. Parker (Republican) 84.99%; ▌Charles E. Robbins (Prohibition) 8.29%; ▌Walter B. Corbin (Socialist) 6.73%
New York 30	William B. Charles	Republican	1914	Incumbent retired. Democratic gain.	▌ ✓ George R. Lunn (Democratic) 47.06%; ▌Henry S. De Forest (Republican) 45.59%; ▌Herbert M. Merrill (Socialist) 5.05%; ▌Alexander T. Blessing (Prohibition) 2.3%
New York 31	Bertrand Snell	Republican	1915 (Special)	Incumbent re-elected.	▌ ✓ Bertrand Snell (Republican) 67.22%; ▌Louis F. Roberts (Democratic) 29.47%; ▌Franklin D. Wallace (Prohibition) 2.39%; Others: ▌Willard C. Thompson (Progressive) 0.57%; ▌Henry Dodd (Socialist) 0.36%
New York 32	Luther W. Mott	Republican	1910	Incumbent re-elected.	▌ ✓ Luther W. Mott (Republican) 62.68%; ▌Otto Pfaff (Democratic) 31.24%; ▌David Watson (Prohibition) 4.82%; ▌George H. Rockburn (Socialist) 1.27%
New York 33	Homer P. Snyder	Republican	1914	Incumbent re-elected.	▌ ✓ Homer P. Snyder (Republican) 55.58%; ▌Charles A. Talcott (Democratic) 41.62%; Others: ▌Fred L. Mould (Prohibition) 1.47%; ▌Carl F. Losen (Socialist) 1.33%
New York 34	George W. Fairchild	Republican	1906	Incumbent re-elected.	▌ ✓ George W. Fairchild (Republican) 58.69%; ▌Cortland A. Wilber (Democratic) 34.45%; ▌Levi Hoag (Prohibition) 5.5%; ▌Joseph White (Socialist) 1.36%
New York 35	Walter W. Magee	Republican	1914	Incumbent re-elected.	▌ ✓ Walter W. Magee (Republican) 60.9%; ▌Arlington H. Mallery (Democratic) 31.12%; ▌Louis D. Porter (Prohibition) 4.32%; ▌Gustave Adolph Strebel (Socialist) 3.66%
New York 36	Norman J. Gould	Republican	1915 (special)	Incumbent re-elected.	▌ ✓ Norman J. Gould (Republican) 62.32%; ▌Hiram G. Hotchkiss (Democratic) 33.65%; ▌Anson L. Gardner (Prohibition) 3.38%; ▌Preston Wright (Socialist) 0.66%
New York 37	Harry H. Pratt	Republican	1914	Incumbent re-elected.	▌ ✓ Harry H. Pratt (Republican) 49.91%; ▌Frederick W. Palmer (Democratic) 43.98%; ▌Casper G. Decker (Prohibition) 4.69%; ▌Joseph G. Roth (Socialist) 1.43%
New York 38	Thomas B. Dunn	Republican	1912	Incumbent re-elected.	▌ ✓ Thomas B. Dunn (Republican) 65.13%; ▌Jacob Gerling (Democratic) 30.21%; ▌Charles Swain (Socialist) 3.03%; ▌Lucius C. Atwater (Prohibition) 1.63%
New York 39	Henry G. Danforth	Republican	1910	Incumbent lost re-nomination. Republican hold.	▌ ✓ Archie D. Sanders (Republican) 65.11%; ▌David A. White (Democratic) 30.78%; ▌William Schalber (Prohibition) 3.14%; ▌William H. Hilsdorf (Socialist) 0.98%
New York 40	S. Wallace Dempsey	Republican	1914	Incumbent re-elected.	▌ ✓ S. Wallace Dempsey (Republican) 61.9%; ▌Andrew B. Gilfillan (Democratic) 33.6%; ▌George A. Till (Socialist) 2.0%; Others: ▌John G. Wallenmeier Jr. (American) 1.37%; ▌Elbert A. Stevens (Prohibition) 1.14%
New York 41	Charles B. Smith	Democratic	1910	Incumbent re-elected.	▌ ✓ Charles B. Smith (Democratic) 56.16%; ▌William H. Crosby (Republican) 40.96%; ▌Martin B. Heisler (Socialist) 2.88%
New York 42	Daniel A. Driscoll	Democratic	1908	Incumbent lost re-election. Republican gain.	▌ ✓ William F. Waldow (Republican) 50.97%; ▌Daniel A. Driscoll (Democratic) 47.25%; ▌Samuel Fawkes (Socialist) 1.78%
New York 43	Charles M. Hamilton	Republican	1912	Incumbent re-elected.	▌ ✓ Charles M. Hamilton (Republican) 64.73%; ▌Albert F. French (Democratic) 27.18%; ▌Arthur A. Amidon (Prohibition) 4.52%; ▌Ralph L. Eberman (Socialist) 3.58%

== North Carolina ==
District	Incumbent			This race	
District	Member	Party	First elected	Results	Candidates
North Carolina 1	John H. Small	Democratic	1898	Incumbent re-elected.	▌ ✓ John H. Small (Democratic) 72.17%; ▌Leslie E. Jones (Republican) 27.83%
North Carolina 2	Claude Kitchin	Democratic	1900	Incumbent re-elected.	▌ ✓ Claude Kitchin (Democratic) 86.90%; ▌W. O. Dixon (Republican) 13.10%
North Carolina 3	George E. Hood	Democratic	1914	Incumbent re-elected.	▌ ✓ George E. Hood (Democratic) 57.99%; ▌George E. Butler (Republican) 42.01%
North Carolina 4	Edward W. Pou	Democratic	1900	Incumbent re-elected.	▌ ✓ Edward W. Pou (Democratic) 64.34%; ▌Joseph J. Jenkins (Republican) 35.66%
North Carolina 5	Charles Manly Stedman	Democratic	1910	Incumbent re-elected.	▌ ✓ Charles Manly Stedman (Democratic) 52.46%; ▌Gilliam Grissom (Republican) 46.97%; ▌George F. Wilson (Socialist) 0.57%
North Carolina 6	Hannibal L. Godwin	Democratic	1906	Incumbent re-elected.	▌ ✓ Hannibal L. Godwin (Democratic) 63.94%; ▌Alexander L. McCaskill (Republican) 36.06%
North Carolina 7	Robert N. Page	Democratic	1902	Incumbent retired. Democratic hold.	▌ ✓ Leonidas D. Robinson (Democratic) 54.66%; ▌Presley E. Brown (Republican) 45.34%
North Carolina 8	Robert L. Doughton	Democratic	1910	Incumbent re-elected.	▌ ✓ Robert L. Doughton (Democratic) 52.81%; ▌H. Sinclair Williams (Republican) 47.19%
North Carolina 9	Edwin Y. Webb	Democratic	1902	Incumbent re-elected.	▌ ✓ Edwin Y. Webb (Democratic) 53.51%; ▌Charles E. Greene (Republican) 46.49%
North Carolina 10	James Jefferson Britt	Republican	1914	Incumbent lost re-election. (Note: The election was contested, and after a prolonged dispute, the House narrowly voted to seat Britt for the final three days of the 65th Congress.); Democratic gain.	▌ ✓ Zebulon Weaver (Democratic) 50.01%; ▌James Jefferson Britt (Republican) 49.99%
North Carolina 10	James Jefferson Britt	Republican	1914	Election successfully contested. Incumbent re-seated March 1, 1919. Republican hold.	▌ ✓ James Jefferson Britt (Republican); ▌ Zebulon Weaver (Democratic)

== North Dakota ==
District	Incumbent			This race	
District	Member	Party	First elected	Results	Candidates
North Dakota 1	Henry T. Helgesen	Republican	1910	Incumbent re-elected.	▌ ✓ Henry T. Helgesen (Republican) 59.9%; ▌George A. Bangs (Democratic) 38.3%; ▌V. Gram (Socialist) 1.8%
North Dakota 2	George M. Young	Republican	1912	Incumbent re-elected.	▌ ✓ George M. Young (Republican) 71.7%; ▌Hugh McDonald (Democratic) 24.6%; ▌Samuel O. Olson (Socialist) 3.7%
North Dakota 3	Patrick Norton	Republican	1912	Incumbent re-elected.	▌ ✓ Patrick Norton (Republican) 65.2%; ▌Charles Simon (Democratic) 26.5%; ▌Anton Klemmens (Socialist) 8.3%

== Ohio ==
District	Incumbent			This race	
District	Member	Party	First elected	Results	Candidates
Ohio 1	Nicholas Longworth	Republican	1902; 1912 (lost); 1914	Incumbent re-elected.	▌ ✓ Nicholas Longworth (Republican)
Ohio 2	Alfred G. Allen	Democratic	1910	Incumbent retired. Republican gain.	▌ ✓ Victor Heintz (Republican)
Ohio 3	Warren Gard	Democratic	1912	Incumbent re-elected.	▌ ✓ Warren Gard (Democratic)
Ohio 4	J. Edward Russell	Republican	1914	Incumbent lost re-election. Democratic gain.	▌ ✓ Benjamin F. Welty (Democratic) ▌J. Edward Russell (Republican)
Ohio 5	Nelson E. Matthews	Republican	1914	Incumbent lost re-election. Democratic gain.	▌ ✓ John S. Snook (Democratic) ▌Nelson E. Matthews (Republican)
Ohio 6	Charles Cyrus Kearns	Republican	1914	Incumbent re-elected.	▌ ✓ Charles Cyrus Kearns (Republican)
Ohio 7	Simeon D. Fess	Republican	1912	Incumbent re-elected.	▌ ✓ Simeon D. Fess (Republican)
Ohio 8	John A. Key	Democratic	1912	Incumbent re-elected.	▌ ✓ John A. Key (Democratic)
Ohio 9	Isaac R. Sherwood	Democratic	1872; 1874 (lost); 1906	Incumbent re-elected.	▌ ✓ Isaac R. Sherwood (Democratic)
Ohio 10	Robert M. Switzer	Republican	1910	Incumbent re-elected.	▌ ✓ Robert M. Switzer (Republican)
Ohio 11	Edwin D. Ricketts	Republican	1914	Incumbent lost re-election. Democratic gain.	▌ ✓ Horatio C. Claypool (Democratic) ▌Edwin D. Ricketts (Republican)
Ohio 12	Clement Laird Brumbaugh	Democratic	1912	Incumbent re-elected.	▌ ✓ Clement Laird Brumbaugh (Democratic)
Ohio 13	Arthur W. Overmyer	Democratic	1914	Incumbent re-elected.	▌ ✓ Arthur W. Overmyer (Democratic)
Ohio 14	Seward H. Williams	Republican	1914	Incumbent lost re-election. Democratic gain.	▌ ✓ Ellsworth Raymond Bathrick (Democratic) ▌Seward H. Williams (Republican)
Ohio 15	William C. Mooney	Republican	1914	Incumbent lost re-election. Democratic gain.	▌ ✓ George White (Democratic) ▌William C. Mooney (Republican)
Ohio 16	Roscoe C. McCulloch	Republican	1914	Incumbent re-elected.	▌ ✓ Roscoe C. McCulloch (Republican)
Ohio 17	William A. Ashbrook	Democratic	1906	Incumbent re-elected.	▌ ✓ William A. Ashbrook (Democratic)
Ohio 18	David Hollingsworth	Republican	1908; 1910 (lost); 1914	Incumbent re-elected.	▌ ✓ David Hollingsworth (Republican)
Ohio 19	John G. Cooper	Republican	1914	Incumbent re-elected.	▌ ✓ John G. Cooper (Republican)
Ohio 20	William Gordon	Democratic	1912	Incumbent re-elected.	▌ ✓ William Gordon (Democratic)
Ohio 21	Robert Crosser	Democratic	1912	Incumbent re-elected.	▌ ✓ Robert Crosser (Democratic)
Ohio 22	Henry I. Emerson	Republican	1914	Incumbent re-elected.	▌ ✓ Henry I. Emerson (Republican)

== Oklahoma ==
District	Incumbent			This race	
District	Member	Party	First elected	Results	Candidates
Oklahoma 1	James S. Davenport	Democratic	1910	Incumbent lost re-election. Republican gain.	▌ ✓ Thomas A. Chandler (Republican) 45.5%; ▌James S. Davenport (Democratic) 44.8%; ▌J. H. Reese (Socialist) 9.2%; ▌F. E. Braden (Prohibition) 0.5%
Oklahoma 2	William W. Hastings	Democratic	1914	Incumbent re-elected.	▌ ✓ William W. Hastings (Democratic) 52.5%; ▌Henry Ward (Republican) 35.4%; ▌J. A. Lewis (Socialist) 12.1%
Oklahoma 3	Charles D. Carter	Democratic	1907	Incumbent re-elected.	▌ ✓ Charles D. Carter (Democratic) 55.1%; ▌Gratton C. McVay (Republican) 27.0%; ▌H. M. Shelton (Socialist) 17.9%
Oklahoma 4	William H. Murray	Democratic	1912	Incumbent lost renomination. Democratic hold.	▌ ✓ Tom D. McKeown (Democratic) 48.3%; ▌James E. Gresham (Republican) 31.4%; ▌Allen C. Adams (Socialist) 20.3%
Oklahoma 5	Joseph B. Thompson	Democratic	1912	Incumbent re-elected.	▌ ✓ Joseph B. Thompson (Democratic) 49.5%; ▌George H. Dodson (Republican) 35.3%; ▌Robert L. Allen (Socialist) 14.7%; ▌Amos Phifer (Prohibition) 0.6%
Oklahoma 6	Scott Ferris	Democratic	1907	Incumbent re-elected.	▌ ✓ Scott Ferris (Democratic) 50.8%; ▌Horace H. Hinkle (Republican) 30.5%; ▌O. M. Morris (Socialist) 18.7%
Oklahoma 7	James V. McClintic	Democratic	1914	Incumbent re-elected.	▌ ✓ James V. McClintic (Democratic) 53.8%; ▌H. H. Stallard (Socialist) 24.6%; ▌T. W. Jones (Republican) 21.2%; ▌E. B. Hackley (Prohibition) 0.4%
Oklahoma 8	Dick T. Morgan	Republican	1908	Incumbent re-elected.	▌ ✓ Dick T. Morgan (Republican) 45.1%; ▌Zach A. Harris (Democratic) 40.0%; ▌Joseph Ottl (Socialist) 13.9%; ▌G. M. Henson (Prohibition) 1.0%

== Oregon ==
District	Incumbent			This race	
District	Member	Party	First elected	Results	Candidates
Oregon 1	Willis C. Hawley	Republican	1906	Incumbent re-elected.	▌ ✓ Willis C. Hawley (Republican) 56.64%; ▌Mark V. Weatherford (Democratic) 36.59%; ▌W. S. Richards (Socialist) 6.78%
Oregon 2	Nicholas J. Sinnott	Republican	1912	Incumbent re-elected.	▌ ✓ Nicholas J. Sinnott (Republican) 84.58%; ▌James H. Barkley (Socialist) 14.14%; Scattering 1.28%
Oregon 3	Clifton N. McArthur	Republican	1914	Incumbent re-elected.	▌ ✓ Clifton N. McArthur (Republican) 47.56%; ▌Walter Lafferty (Progressive) 36.70%; ▌John A. Jeffrey (Democratic) 13.04%; ▌Albert Streiff (Socialist) 2.70%

== Pennsylvania ==
District	Incumbent			This race	
District	Member	Party	First elected	Results	Candidates
Pennsylvania 1	William S. Vare	Republican	1912 (special)	Incumbent re-elected.	▌ ✓ William S. Vare (Republican) 71.68%; ▌Lawrence E. McCrossin (Democratic) 26.33%; ▌John L. Silvey (Socialist) 1.99%
Pennsylvania 2	George S. Graham	Republican	1912	Incumbent re-elected.	▌ ✓ George S. Graham (Republican) 75.97%; ▌Thomas E. Shea (Democratic) 22.60%; ▌Harry A. Goldberg (Socialist) 1.43%
Pennsylvania 3	J. Hampton Moore	Republican	1906 (special)	Incumbent re-elected.	▌ ✓ J. Hampton Moore (Republican) 73.59%; ▌Joseph Hagerty (Democratic) 23.58%; Others: ▌Emanuel Kline (Socialist) 1.55%; ▌Abraham L. Weinstock (Progressive) 1.28%
Pennsylvania 4	George W. Edmonds	Republican	1912	Incumbent re-elected.	▌ ✓ George W. Edmonds (Republican) 68.17%; ▌Patrick H. Lynch (Democratic) 28.97%; ▌Jacob H. Root (Socialist) 2.36%; ▌John Stay (Prohibition) 0.50%
Pennsylvania 5	Peter E. Costello	Republican	1914	Incumbent re-elected.	▌ ✓ Peter E. Costello (Republican) 59.32%; ▌Michael Donohoe (Democratic) 34.12%; ▌Clarence O. Pratt (Prohibition) 4.46%; ▌John N. Landberg (Socialist) 2.04%; ▌Oliver Wingert (Single Tax) 0.05%
Pennsylvania 6	George P. Darrow	Republican	1914	Incumbent re-elected.	▌ ✓ George P. Darrow (Republican) 67.59%; ▌J. Washington Logue (Democratic) 30.86%; ▌Robert A. Mays (Socialist) 1.55%
Pennsylvania 7	Thomas S. Butler	Republican	1902	Incumbent re-elected.	▌ ✓ Thomas S. Butler (Republican) 62.99%; ▌Edward B. Cassatt (Democratic) 34.12%; Others: ▌Joseph H. Paschall (Prohibition) 1.92%; ▌Walter N. Lodge (Socialist) 0.97%
Pennsylvania 8	Henry W. Watson	Republican	1914	Incumbent re-elected.	▌ ✓ Henry W. Watson (Republican) 56.99%; ▌Joseph Heacock (Democratic) 39.96%; Others: ▌Frank R. Whiteside (Socialist) 1.88%; ▌Charles N. Rambo (Prohibition) 0.92%; ▌James H. Dix (Single Tax) 0.25%
Pennsylvania 9	William W. Griest	Republican	1908	Incumbent re-elected.	▌ ✓ William W. Griest (Republican) 64.19%; ▌Henry F. Myers (Democratic) 30.42%; ▌S. S. Watts (Prohibition) 3.57%; ▌E. W. Stoner (Socialist) 1.82%
Pennsylvania 10	John R. Farr	Republican	1910	Incumbent re-elected.	▌ ✓ John R. Farr (Republican) 53.05%; ▌Victor Burschel (Democratic) 43.74%; Others: ▌Giles Clark (Prohibition) 1.80%; ▌Lee B. Woodcock (Socialist) 1.41%
Pennsylvania 11	John J. Casey	Democratic	1912	Incumbent lost re-election. Republican gain.	▌ ✓ Thomas W. Templeton (Republican) 53.44%; ▌John J. Casey (Democratic) 42.30%; ▌Earl W. Husted (Socialist) 2.39%; ▌Jonathan R. Davis (Prohibition) 1.86%
Pennsylvania 12	Robert D. Heaton	Republican	1914	Incumbent re-elected.	▌ ✓ Robert D. Heaton (Republican) 61.06%; ▌Robert E. Lee (Democratic) 36.12%; ▌W. J. McDonald (Socialist) 2.83%
Pennsylvania 13	Arthur G. Dewalt	Democratic	1914	Incumbent re-elected.	▌ ✓ Arthur G. Dewalt (Democratic) 49.86%; ▌Horace W. Shantz (Republican) 41.26%; ▌Elwood W. Leffler (Socialist) 7.94%; ▌G. A. Loose (Prohibition) 0.94%
Pennsylvania 14	Louis T. McFadden	Republican	1914	Incumbent re-elected.	▌ ✓ Louis T. McFadden (Republican) 55.60%; ▌John D. Brennan (Democratic) 36.21%; ▌William S. Heermans (Prohibition) 5.21%; Others: ▌Frank E. Wood (Progressive) 1.75%; ▌Worthy Arthur (Socialist) 1.23%
Pennsylvania 15	Edgar R. Kiess	Republican	1912	Incumbent re-elected.	▌ ✓ Edgar R. Kiess (Republican) 59.54%; ▌Chester H. Ashton (Democratic) 34.69%; ▌Patrick A. McGowan (Socialist) 5.77%
Pennsylvania 16	John V. Lesher	Democratic	1912	Incumbent re-elected.	▌ ✓ John V. Lesher (Democratic) 51.81%; ▌I. Clinton Kline (Republican) 44.47%; ▌William B. Koch (Socialist) 3.73%
Pennsylvania 17	Benjamin K. Focht	Republican	1914	Incumbent re-elected.	▌ ✓ Benjamin K. Focht (Republican) 50.43%; ▌George A. Harris (Democratic) 47.05%; ▌Frank Thompson (Socialist) 2.52%
Pennsylvania 18	Aaron S. Kreider	Republican	1912	Incumbent re-elected.	▌ ✓ Aaron S. Kreider (Republican) 51.65%; ▌Harry B. Saussaman (Democratic) 42.66%; ▌George A. Steiner (Socialist) 2.99%; ▌J. A. Sprenkel (Prohibition) 2.71%
Pennsylvania 19	Warren W. Bailey	Democratic	1912	Incumbent lost re-election. Republican gain.	▌ ✓ John M. Rose (Republican) 50.44%; ▌Warren W. Bailey (Democratic) 46.78%; ▌Daniel W. Murphy (Socialist) 2.79%
Pennsylvania 20	C. William Beales	Republican	1914	Incumbent retired. Democratic gain.	▌ ✓ Andrew R. Brodbeck (Democratic) 50.22%; ▌Samuel K. McCall (Republican) 44.34%; ▌Henry H. Trumpfheller (Prohibition) 3.20%; ▌William H. Dehoff (Socialist) 2.24%
Pennsylvania 21	Charles H. Rowland	Republican	1914	Incumbent re-elected.	▌ ✓ Charles H. Rowland (Republican) 47.65%; ▌William E. Tobias (Democratic) 46.95%; ▌George W. Fox (Socialist) 5.40%
Pennsylvania 22	Abraham L. Keister	Republican	1912	Incumbent lost renomination. Republican hold.	▌ ✓ Edward E. Robbins (Republican) 48.44%; ▌Silas A. Kline (Democratic) 39.20%; ▌Charles Cunningham (Socialist) 7.14%; ▌R. S. Irwin (Prohibition) 5.22%
Pennsylvania 23	Robert F. Hopwood	Republican	1914	Incumbent lost re-election. Democratic gain.	▌ ✓ Bruce F. Sterling (Democratic) 48.15%; ▌Robert F. Hopwood (Republican) 45.67%; ▌William H. Ream (Socialist) 3.90%; ▌Daniel Sturgeon (Prohibition) 2.28%
Pennsylvania 24	Henry W. Temple	Republican	1915 (special)	Incumbent re-elected.	▌ ✓ Henry W. Temple (Republican) 54.35%; ▌William J. Mellon (Democratic) 34.93%; ▌W. K. Ramsey (Socialist) 6.76%; ▌J. B. Smith (Prohibition) 3.96%
Pennsylvania 25	Michael Liebel Jr.	Democratic	1914	Incumbent retired. Republican gain.	▌ ✓ Henry A. Clark (Republican) 43.14%; ▌Charles N. Crosby (Democratic) 41.94%; ▌William W. Kinclaid (Prohibition) 9.75%; ▌Ralph W. Tillotson (Socialist) 5.17%
Pennsylvania 26	Henry J. Steele	Democratic	1914	Incumbent re-elected.	▌ ✓ Henry J. Steele (Democratic) 53.46%; ▌Winfred D. Lewis (Republican) 43.23%; ▌Elmer E. Field (Prohibition) 3.01%
Pennsylvania 27	S. Taylor North	Republican	1914	Incumbent lost renomination. Republican hold.	▌ ✓ Nathan L. Strong (Republican) 55.91%; ▌Harry C. Golden (Democratic) 33.96%; ▌John B. DeSantis (Prohibition) 5.66%; ▌Reuben Einstein (Socialist) 4.47%
Pennsylvania 28	Samuel H. Miller	Republican	1914	Incumbent retired. Republican hold.	▌ ✓ Orrin D. Bleakley (Republican) 47.68%; ▌Earl H. Beshlin (Democratic) 35.97%; ▌A. R. Rich (Prohibition) 10.06%; ▌William E. Ashe (Socialist) 6.09%
Pennsylvania 29	Stephen G. Porter	Republican	1910	Incumbent re-elected.	▌ ✓ Stephen G. Porter (Republican) 67.83%; ▌A. M. Thompson (Democratic) 24.14%; ▌Karl C. Jursek (Socialist) 6.00%; ▌Robert J. Smith (Prohibition) 2.03%
Pennsylvania 30	William H. Coleman	Republican	1914	Incumbent lost re-election. Progressive gain.	▌ ✓ M. Clyde Kelly (Progressive) 47.58%; ▌William H. Coleman (Republican) 46.94%; ▌William Adams (Socialist) 5.48%
Pennsylvania 31	John M. Morin	Republican	1912	Incumbent re-elected.	▌ ✓ John M. Morin (Republican) 87.20%; ▌Fred C. Brittain (Prohibition) 6.40%; ▌James Devlin (Socialist) 6.40%
Pennsylvania 32	Andrew J. Barchfeld	Republican	1904	Incumbent lost re-election. Democratic gain.	▌ ✓ Guy E. Campbell (Democratic) 45.84%; ▌Andrew J. Barchfeld (Republican) 45.72%; ▌William W. Nooning (Socialist) 6.48%; ▌George E. Briggs (Prohibition) 1.96%
Pennsylvania at-large 4 seats on a general ticket	John R. K. Scott	Republican	1914	Incumbent re-elected.	▌ ✓ Thomas S. Crago (Republican) 14.15%; ▌ ✓ John R. K. Scott (Republican) 14.01%; ▌ ✓ Mahlon M. Garland (Republican) 13.93%; ▌ ✓ Joseph McLaughlin (Republican) 12.82%; ▌Thomas Ross (Democratic) 9.98%; ▌John J. Moore (Democratic) 9.31%; ▌Joseph T. Kinsley (Democratic) 9.31%; ▌Jacob B. Waidelich (Democratic) 9.05%; Others: ▌William A. Prosser (Socialist) 0.99%; ▌Elizabeth N. Blair (Socialist) 0.96%; ▌John W. Slayton (Socialist) 0.96%; ▌Fred W. Whiteside (Socialist) 0.96%; ▌Fred Goff (Prohibition) 0.63%; ▌Robert C. Bair (Progressive) 0.59%; ▌Arthur Graham (Progressive) 0.58%; ▌Frank L. Morton (Prohibition) 0.56%; ▌Butler C. McGrew (Prohibition) 0.55%; ▌J. Calvin Rummel (Prohibition) 0.53%
Pennsylvania at-large 4 seats on a general ticket	Thomas S. Crago	Republican	1914	Incumbent re-elected.	
Pennsylvania at-large 4 seats on a general ticket	Daniel F. Lafean	Republican	1914	Incumbent retired. Republican hold.	
Pennsylvania at-large 4 seats on a general ticket	Mahlon M. Garland	Republican	1914	Incumbent re-elected.	

== Rhode Island ==
District	Incumbent			This race	
District	Member	Party	First elected	Results	Candidates
Rhode Island 1	George F. O'Shaunessy	Democratic	1910	Incumbent re-elected.	▌ ✓ George F. O'Shaunessy (Democratic) 53.94%; ▌Ezra Dixon (Republican) 44.17%; ▌Walter E. Myers (Socialist) 1.89%
Rhode Island 2	Walter R. Stiness	Republican	1914	Incumbent re-elected.	▌ ✓ Walter R. Stiness (Republican) 55.27%; ▌Sumner Mowry (Democratic) 42.04%; ▌Ernest Sherwood (Socialist) 2.69%
Rhode Island 3	Ambrose Kennedy	Republican	1912	Incumbent re-elected.	▌ ✓ Ambrose Kennedy (Republican) 50.41%; ▌Joseph McDonald (Democratic) 47.08%; ▌Thomas C. Jones (Socialist) 2.51%

== South Carolina ==
District	Incumbent			This race	
District	Member	Party	First elected	Results	Candidates
South Carolina 1	Richard S. Whaley	Democratic	1913 (special)	Incumbent re-elected.	▌ ✓ Richard S. Whaley (Democratic) 95.4%; ▌J. O. Ladd (Republican) 4.6%
South Carolina 2	James F. Byrnes	Democratic	1910	Incumbent re-elected.	▌ ✓ James F. Byrnes (Democratic) 98.5%; ▌Isaac Myers (Republican) 1.5%
South Carolina 3	Wyatt Aiken	Democratic	1902	Incumbent lost renomination. Democratic hold.	▌ ✓ Frederick H. Dominick (Democratic) 100%
South Carolina 4	Samuel J. Nicholls	Democratic	1915 (special)	Incumbent re-elected.	▌ ✓ Samuel J. Nicholls (Democratic) 99.4%; ▌G. F. Mills (Republican) 0.6%
South Carolina 5	David E. Finley	Democratic	1898	Incumbent re-elected.	▌ ✓ David E. Finley (Democratic) 100%
South Carolina 6	J. Willard Ragsdale	Democratic	1912	Incumbent re-elected.	▌ ✓ J. Willard Ragsdale (Democratic) 99.1%; ▌W. L. McFarlan (Republican) 0.9%
South Carolina 7	A. Frank Lever	Democratic	1901 (special)	Incumbent re-elected.	▌ ✓ A. Frank Lever (Democratic) 93.5%; ▌I. S. Leevy (Republican) 6.5%

== South Dakota ==
District	Incumbent			This race	
District	Member	Party	First elected	Results	Candidates
South Dakota 1	Charles H. Dillon	Republican	1912	Incumbent re-elected.	▌ ✓ Charles H. Dillon (Republican) 58.1%; ▌O. D. Anderson (Democratic) 40.2%; ▌H. W. Fenner (Socialist) 1.7%
South Dakota 2	Royal C. Johnson	Republican	1914	Incumbent re-elected.	▌ ✓ Royal C. Johnson (Republican) 60.1%; ▌J. J. Batterton (Democratic) 34.7%; ▌E. Francis Atwood (Socialist) 3.4%; ▌R. Clendening (Prohibition) 1.8%
South Dakota 3	Harry Gandy	Democratic	1914	Incumbent re-elected.	▌ ✓ Harry Gandy (Democratic) 55.6%; ▌John G. Bartine (Republican) 40.9%; ▌B. M. Mulcahy (Socialist) 3.4%

== Tennessee ==
District	Incumbent			This race	
District	Member	Party	First elected	Results	Candidates
Tennessee 1	Sam R. Sells	Republican	1910	Incumbent re-elected.	▌ ✓ Sam R. Sells (Republican) 96.85%; ▌Artie Isenberg (Democratic) 3.15%
Tennessee 2	Richard W. Austin	Republican	1908	Incumbent re-elected.	▌ ✓ Richard W. Austin (Republican) 90.02%; ▌J. S. Fitzgerald (Democratic) 5.42%; ▌T. J. Rowland (Socialist) 4.56%
Tennessee 3	John A. Moon	Democratic	1896	Incumbent re-elected.	▌ ✓ John A. Moon (Democratic) 53.85%; ▌Jessie M. Littleton (Republican) 45.31%; ▌W. R. Hipp (Socialist) 0.84%
Tennessee 4	Cordell Hull	Democratic	1906	Incumbent re-elected.	▌ ✓ Cordell Hull (Democratic) 60.19%; ▌J. F. Benson (Republican) 39.57%; ▌G. W. Hatfield (Socialist) 0.24%
Tennessee 5	William C. Houston	Democratic	1904	Incumbent re-elected.	▌ ✓ William C. Houston (Democratic) 86.42%; ▌Sid Houston (Republican) 13.58%
Tennessee 6	Jo Byrns	Democratic	1908	Incumbent re-elected.	▌ ✓ Jo Byrns (Democratic) 84.07%; ▌C. E. Tippens (Republican) 14.36%; ▌J. M. Lindsley (Socialist) 1.57%
Tennessee 7	Lemuel P. Padgett	Democratic	1900	Incumbent re-elected.	▌ ✓ Lemuel P. Padgett (Democratic) 62.98%; ▌G. A. Yost (Republican) 36.83%; ▌F. W. Porter (Socialist) 0.20%
Tennessee 8	Thetus W. Sims	Democratic	1896	Incumbent re-elected.	▌ ✓ Thetus W. Sims (Democratic) 50.35%; ▌L. M. Rhodes (Republican) 49.52%; ▌G. L. Burkhead (Socialist) 0.13%
Tennessee 9	Finis J. Garrett	Democratic	1904	Incumbent re-elected.	▌ ✓ Finis J. Garrett (Democratic) 75.40%; ▌W. N. Beasley (Republican) 24.60%
Tennessee 10	Kenneth McKellar	Democratic	1911 (special)	Incumbent retired to run for U.S. senator. Democratic hold.	▌ ✓ Hubert Fisher (Democratic) 67.95%; ▌Wayman Wilkerson (Colored) 17.94%; ▌Jonathan W. Farley (Republican) 10.19%; ▌W. A. Weatherall (Socialist) 3.92%

== Texas ==
District	Incumbent			This race	
District	Member	Party	First elected	Results	Candidates
Texas 1	Eugene Black	Democratic	1914	Incumbent re-elected.	▌ ✓ Eugene Black (Democratic) 83.3%; ▌David H. Morris (Republican) 11.0%; ▌J. C. Thompson (Socialist) 5.7%
Texas 2	Martin Dies Sr.	Democratic	1908	Incumbent re-elected.	▌ ✓ Martin Dies Sr. (Democratic) 86.1%; ▌J. B. Truitt (Socialist) 7.4%; ▌A. E. Sweatland (Republican) 6.4%
Texas 3	James Young	Democratic	1910	Incumbent re-elected.	▌ ✓ James Young (Democratic) 88.3%; ▌J. L. Scroggin (Socialist) 11.7%
Texas 4	Sam Rayburn	Democratic	1912	Incumbent re-elected.	▌ ✓ Sam Rayburn (Democratic) 83.5%; ▌G. J. Barlow (Republican) 9.6%; ▌W. J. Lennon (Socialist) 6.9%
Texas 5	Hatton W. Sumners	Democratic	1912	Incumbent re-elected.	▌ ✓ Hatton W. Sumners (Democratic) 88.2%; ▌B. F. Crews (Republican) 10.2%; ▌W. G. Brewer (Socialist) 1.6%
Texas 6	Rufus Hardy	Democratic	1906	Incumbent re-elected.	▌ ✓ Rufus Hardy (Democratic) 95.3%; ▌W. H. Wilson (Socialist) 4.7%
Texas 7	Alexander W. Gregg	Democratic	1902	Incumbent re-elected.	▌ ✓ Alexander W. Gregg (Democratic) 79.4%; ▌Theodore F. Heiger (Republican) 11.3%; ▌Willis Kendall (Republican) 5.1%; ▌T. E. Foster (Socialist) 4.1%
Texas 8	Joe H. Eagle	Democratic	1912	Incumbent re-elected.	▌ ✓ Joe H. Eagle (Democratic) 82.2%; ▌Ira P. Jones (Republican) 14.2%; ▌John W. Conner (Socialist) 3.6%
Texas 9	George F. Burgess	Democratic	1900	Incumbent retired to run for U.S. senator. Democratic hold.	▌ ✓ Joseph J. Mansfield (Democratic) 76.4%; ▌C. M. Hughes (Republican) 19.3%; ▌B. F. Wright (Socialist) 4.4%
Texas 10	James P. Buchanan	Democratic	1913 (special)	Incumbent re-elected.	▌ ✓ James P. Buchanan (Democratic) 86.7%; ▌Robert A. Brooks (Republican) 13.3%
Texas 11	Robert L. Henry	Democratic	1896	Incumbent retired to run for U.S. senator. Democratic hold.	▌ ✓ Tom Connally (Democratic) 87.7%; ▌John L. Vaughn (Republican) 8.6%; ▌T. M. DeLoach (Socialist) 3.7%
Texas 12	Oscar Callaway	Democratic	1910	Incumbent lost renomination. Democratic hold.	▌ ✓ James C. Wilson (Democratic) 85.7%; ▌Henry F. Zweifel (Republican) 7.8%; ▌Leeland G. Baker (Socialist) 6.5%
Texas 13	John H. Stephens	Democratic	1896	Incumbent lost renomination. Democratic hold.	▌ ✓ J. Marvin Jones (Democratic) 85.8%; ▌J. L. Van Natta (Republican) 7.9%; ▌J. A. Pressly (Socialist) 6.3%
Texas 14	James L. Slayden	Democratic	1896	Incumbent re-elected.	▌ ✓ James L. Slayden (Democratic) 79.4%; ▌D. F. Johnson (Republican) 20.6%
Texas 15	John N. Garner	Democratic	1902	Incumbent re-elected.	▌ ✓ John N. Garner (Democratic) 73.4%; ▌Harry M. Wurzbach (Republican) 24.1%; ▌John H. Greer (Socialist) 2.5%
Texas 16	William R. Smith	Democratic	1902	Incumbent lost renomination. Democratic hold.	▌ ✓ Thomas L. Blanton (Democratic) 85.0%; ▌T. B. Holiday (Socialist) 7.9%; ▌C. O. Harris (Republican) 7.1%
Texas at-large 2 seats on a general ticket	James H. Davis	Democratic	1914	Incumbent lost renomination. Democratic hold.	▌ ✓ A. Jeff McLemore (Democratic) 41.0%; ▌ ✓ Daniel E. Garrett (Democratic) 40.8%; ▌Charles A. Warnken (Republican) 6.4%; ▌M. A. Taylor (Republican) 6.3%; ▌Arch Lingan (Socialist) 2.5%; ▌William D. Simpson (Socialist) 2.5%; Others: ▌I. E. Teague (Prohibition) 0.2%; ▌E. G. Cook (Prohibition) 0.2%
Texas at-large 2 seats on a general ticket	A. Jeff McLemore	Democratic	1914	Incumbent re-elected.	▌ ✓ A. Jeff McLemore (Democratic) 41.0%; ▌ ✓ Daniel E. Garrett (Democratic) 40.8%; ▌Charles A. Warnken (Republican) 6.4%; ▌M. A. Taylor (Republican) 6.3%; ▌Arch Lingan (Socialist) 2.5%; ▌William D. Simpson (Socialist) 2.5%; Others: ▌I. E. Teague (Prohibition) 0.2%; ▌E. G. Cook (Prohibition) 0.2%

== Utah ==
District	Incumbent			This race	
District	Member	Party	First elected	Results	Candidates
Utah 1	Joseph Howell	Republican	1902	Incumbent retired. Democratic gain.	▌ ✓ Milton H. Welling (Democratic) 55.55%; ▌Timothy C. Hoyt (Republican) 41.49%; ▌Daniel Konald (Socialist) 2.96%
Utah 2	James H. Mays	Democratic	1914	Incumbent re-elected.	▌ ✓ James H. Mays (Democratic) 56.87%; ▌Charles R. Mabey (Republican) 39.65%; ▌Murray E. King (Socialist) 3.48%

== Vermont ==
District	Incumbent			This race	
District	Member	Party	First elected	Results	Candidates
Vermont 1	Frank L. Greene	Republican	1912 (special)	Incumbent re-elected.	▌ ✓ Frank L. Greene (Republican) 71.06%; ▌Emmett B. Daley (Democratic) 25.71%; Others: ▌Warren S. Newton (Prohibition) 1.96%; ▌John Spargo (Socialist) 1.26%
Vermont 2	Porter H. Dale	Republican	1914	Incumbent re-elected.	▌ ✓ Porter H. Dale (Republican) 72.19%; ▌George H. Pape (Democratic) 25.39%; ▌John P. Marsh (Socialist) 2.42%

== Virginia ==
District	Incumbent			This race	
District	Member	Party	First elected	Results	Candidates
Virginia 1	William A. Jones	Democratic	1890	Incumbent re-elected.	▌ ✓ William A. Jones (Democratic) 76.5%; ▌William W. Butzner (Republican) 22.1%; Others: ▌C. Campbell (Socialist) 0.8%; ▌John Bader (Socialist Labor) 0.6%
Virginia 2	Edward E. Holland	Democratic	1910	Incumbent re-elected.	▌ ✓ Edward E. Holland (Democratic) 82.4%; ▌Luther B. Way (Republican) 15.8%; Others: ▌Robert D. McElvary (Socialist) 1.0%; ▌B. D. Downey (Socialist Labor) 0.8%
Virginia 3	Andrew J. Montague	Democratic	1912	Incumbent re-elected.	▌ ✓ Andrew J. Montague (Democratic) 93.6%; ▌F. E. Maxey (Socialist) 6.4%
Virginia 4	Walter A. Watson	Democratic	1912	Incumbent re-elected.	▌ ✓ Walter A. Watson (Democratic) 90.8%; ▌W. B. Alfred (Republican) 4.8%; ▌Fred Herzig (Socialist) 4.5%
Virginia 5	Edward W. Saunders	Democratic	1906 (special)	Incumbent re-elected.	▌ ✓ Edward W. Saunders (Democratic) 57.8%; ▌Beverly A. Davis (Republican) 41.4%; ▌Robert D. Boswell (Independent) 0.8%
Virginia 6	Carter Glass	Democratic	1902 (special)	Incumbent re-elected.	▌ ✓ Carter Glass (Democratic) 73.6%; ▌George W. Wilson (Republican) 23.6%; ▌B. F. Ginther (Socialist) 2.8%
Virginia 7	Vacant			James Hay (D) resigned October 1, 1916 when appointed to the Court of Claims. Democratic hold.	▌ ✓ Thomas W. Harrison (Democratic) 61.8%; ▌John Paul Jr. (Republican) 37.3%; ▌E. C. Garrison (Independent) 0.9%
Virginia 8	Charles C. Carlin	Democratic	1907 (special)	Incumbent re-elected.	▌ ✓ Charles C. Carlin (Democratic) 71.8%; ▌Joseph L. Crupper (Republican) 27.0%; Others: ▌Frank E. Manning (Independent) 0.6%; ▌William H. Hamilton (Independent) 0.5%
Virginia 9	C. Bascom Slemp	Republican	1907 (special)	Incumbent re-elected.	▌ ✓ C. Bascom Slemp (Republican) 51.9%; ▌Elbert L. Trinkle (Democratic) 47.8%; ▌B. M. Dutton (Socialist) 0.3%
Virginia 10	Henry D. Flood	Democratic	1900	Incumbent re-elected.	▌ ✓ Henry D. Flood (Democratic) 69.9%; ▌C. P. Nair (Republican) 28.4%; ▌F. D. Lowe (Independent) 1.7%

== Washington ==
District	Incumbent			This race	
District	Member	Party	First elected	Results	Candidates
Washington 1	William E. Humphrey	Republican	1902	Incumbent retired to run for U.S. senator. Republican hold.	▌ ✓ John F. Miller (Republican) 50.27%; ▌George F. Cotterill (Democratic) 46.31%; ▌E. B. Tryon (Socialist) 3.42%
Washington 2	Lindley H. Hadley	Republican	1914	Incumbent re-elected.	▌ ✓ Lindley H. Hadley (Republican) 47.06%; ▌Frances C. Axtell (Democratic) 41.74%; ▌R. J. Olinger (Socialist) 11.21%
Washington 3	Albert Johnson	Republican	1912	Incumbent re-elected.	▌ ✓ Albert Johnson (Republican) 57.11%; ▌George P. Fishburne (Democratic) 36.07%; ▌W. F. Ferguson (Socialist) 6.82%
Washington 4	William La Follette	Republican	1910	Incumbent re-elected.	▌ ✓ William La Follette (Republican) 58.78%; ▌Charles W. Masterson (Democratic) 36.66%; ▌Walter Price (Socialist) 4.56%
Washington 5	Clarence Dill	Democratic	1914	Incumbent re-elected.	▌ ✓ Clarence Dill (Democratic) 51.53%; ▌Thomas Corkery (Republican) 44.41%; ▌John M. Powers (Socialist) 4.06%

== West Virginia ==
District	Incumbent			This race	
District	Member	Party	First elected	Results	Candidates
West Virginia 1	Matthew M. Neely	Democratic	1913 (special)	Incumbent re-elected.	▌ ✓ Matthew M. Neely (Democratic) 50.65%; ▌J. W. Fleming (Republican) 49.36%
West Virginia 2	George M. Bowers	Republican	1916 (special)	Incumbent re-elected.	▌ ✓ George M. Bowers (Republican) 50.91%; ▌Samuel V. Woods (Democratic) 49.09%
West Virginia 3	None (New district)			New district. Republican gain.	▌ ✓ Stuart F. Reed (Republican) 50.74%; ▌Fleming N. Alderson (Democratic) 49.26%
West Virginia 4	Vacant			Hunter H. Moss Jr. (R) died July 15, 1916. Republican hold.	▌ ✓ Harry C. Woodyard (Republican) 50.31%; ▌T. A. Null (Democratic) 49.69%
West Virginia 5	Edward Cooper	Republican	1914	Incumbent re-elected.	▌ ✓ Edward Cooper (Republican) 51.72%; ▌G. R. Wiles (Democratic) 48.28%
West Virginia 6	Adam B. Littlepage; Redistricted from the 3rd district	Democratic	1914	Incumbent re-elected.	▌ ✓ Adam B. Littlepage (Democratic) 51.54%; ▌M. V. Godbey (Republican) 48.46%
West Virginia 6	Howard Sutherland; Redistricted from the at-large district	Republican	1912	Incumbent retired to run for U.S. senator. Republican loss.	▌ ✓ Adam B. Littlepage (Democratic) 51.54%; ▌M. V. Godbey (Republican) 48.46%

== Wisconsin ==
District	Incumbent			This race	
District	Member	Party	First elected	Results	Candidates
Wisconsin 1	Henry A. Cooper	Republican	1892	Incumbent re-elected.	▌ ✓ Henry A. Cooper (Republican) 61.6%; ▌Jay W. Page (Democratic) 31.2%; ▌William J. Hensche (Prohibition) 3.7%; ▌Michael Yabs (Soc. Dem.) 3.6%
Wisconsin 2	Michael E. Burke	Democratic	1910	Incumbent lost re-election. Republican gain.	▌ ✓ Edward Voigt (Republican) 51.3%; ▌Michael E. Burke (Democratic) 45.9%; ▌John Bauerfeind (Soc. Dem.) 2.8%
Wisconsin 3	John M. Nelson	Republican	1906 (special)	Incumbent re-elected.	▌ ✓ John M. Nelson (Republican) 61.8%; ▌M. J. Briggs (Democratic) 35.1%; ▌David L. Dobson (Prohibition) 2.2%; ▌Emil Orne (Soc. Dem) 0.9
Wisconsin 4	William J. Cary	Republican	1906	Incumbent re-elected.	▌ ✓ William J. Cary (Republican) 35.5%; ▌Winfield Gaylord (Soc. Dem.) 32.7%; ▌Anthony Szczerbinski (Democratic) 30.9%; ▌Winfred D. Cox (Prohibition) 1.0%
Wisconsin 5	William H. Stafford	Republican	1912	Incumbent re-elected.	▌ ✓ William H. Stafford (Republican) 45.4%; ▌Victor L. Berger (Soc. Dem.) 36.9%; ▌Lyman H. Browne (Democratic) 17.2%; ▌Wallace R. Drought (Prohibition) 0.5%
Wisconsin 6	Michael Reilly	Democratic	1912	Incumbent lost re-election. Republican gain.	▌ ✓ James H. Davidson (Republican) 52.3%; ▌Michael Reilly (Democratic) 44.0%; ▌Robert Zingler (Soc. Dem.) 2.4%; ▌Clarence O. Tinkham (Prohibition) 1.3%
Wisconsin 7	John J. Esch	Republican	1898	Incumbent re-elected.	▌ ✓ John J. Esch (Republican) 68.2%; ▌Herman Grotophorst (Democratic) 27.0%; ▌C. L. Clifford (Prohibition) 2.8%; ▌Charles A. Noetzelman (Soc. Dem.) 2.1%
Wisconsin 8	Edward E. Browne	Republican	1912	Incumbent re-elected.	▌ ✓ Edward E. Browne (Republican) 67.5%; ▌John Kalmes (Democratic) 29.5%; ▌Charles Kiesner (Soc. Dem.) 3.0%
Wisconsin 9	Thomas F. Konop	Democratic	1910	Incumbent lost re-election. Republican gain.	▌ ✓ David G. Classon (Republican) 52.5%; ▌Thomas F. Konop (Democratic) 46.0%; ▌Frederick Nanman (Soc. Dem.) 1.5%
Wisconsin 10	James A. Frear	Republican	1912	Incumbent re-elected.	▌ ✓ James A. Frear (Republican) 69.6%; ▌Andrew Sutherland (Democratic) 28.0%; ▌John Waldal (Prohibition) 2.4%
Wisconsin 11	Irvine Lenroot	Republican	1908	Incumbent re-elected.	▌ ✓ Irvine Lenroot (Republican) 67.4%; ▌George C. Cooper (Democratic) 25.9%; ▌Henry M. Parks (Soc. Dem.) 6.7%

== Wyoming ==
District	Incumbent			This race	
District	Member	Party	First elected	Results	Candidates
Wyoming at-large	Frank W. Mondell	Republican	1898	Incumbent re-elected.	▌ ✓ Frank W. Mondell (Republican) 49.02%; ▌John D. Clark (Democratic) 47.96%; ▌George E. Bateman (Socialist) 2.59%

== Non-voting delegates ==
=== Alaska Territory ===
District	Incumbent			This race	
District	Member	Party	First elected	Results	Candidates
Alaska Territory at-large	James Wickersham	Republican	1908	Incumbent lost re-election. Democratic gain.	▌ ✓ Charles A. Sulzer (Democratic); ▌James Wickersham (Republican)
Alaska Territory at-large	James Wickersham	Republican	1908	Election successfully contested. Incumbent re-seated January 7, 1919. Republican hold.	▌ ✓ James Wickersham (Republican); ▌Charles A. Sulzer (Democratic)

=== Hawaii Territory ===
District	Incumbent			This race	
District	Member	Party	First elected	Results	Candidates
Hawaii Territory at-large	J. Kūhiō Kalanianaʻole	Republican	1902	Incumbent re-elected.	▌ ✓ J. Kūhiō Kalanianaʻole (Republican) 57.74%; ▌Lincoln L. McCandless (Democratic) 42.26%

=== Philippines ===
District	Incumbent			This race	
District	Member	Party	First elected	Results	Candidates
Philippines at-large	Vacant			Del. Manuel L. Quezón (N) retired October 16, 1916. Nacionalista hold.	▌ ✓ Jaime C. de Veyra (Nacionalista); ▌ ✓ Teodoro R. Yangco (Nonpartisan); [data missing]
Philippines at-large	Manuel Earnshaw	Nonpartisan	1912	Incumbent retired. Nonpartisan hold.	▌ ✓ Jaime C. de Veyra (Nacionalista); ▌ ✓ Teodoro R. Yangco (Nonpartisan); [data missing]

== See also ==
- 1916 United States elections
  - 1916 United States presidential election
  - 1916 United States Senate elections
- 64th United States Congress
- 65th United States Congress

== Bibliography ==
- Dubin, Michael J. (March 1, 1998). United States Congressional Elections, 1788-1997: The Official Results of the Elections of the 1st Through 105th Congresses. McFarland and Company. ISBN 978-0786402830.
- Martis, Kenneth C. (January 1, 1989). The Historical Atlas of Political Parties in the United States Congress, 1789-1989. Macmillan Publishing Company. ISBN 978-0029201701.
- Moore, John L., ed. (1994). Congressional Quarterly's Guide to U.S. Elections (Third ed.). Congressional Quarterly Inc. ISBN 978-0871879967.
- "Party Divisions of the House of Representatives* 1789–Present". Office of the Historian, House of United States House of Representatives.
- Secretary of State (1916). Maryland Manual 1916–17. Annapolis: The Advertiser-Republican.
