= 1915 United States House of Representatives elections =

There were four special elections to the United States House of Representatives in 1915:

District	Incumbent			This race	
District	Member	Party	First elected	Results	Candidates
South Carolina 4	Joseph T. Johnson	Democratic	1900	Incumbent resigned April 19, 1915 to become judge of the U.S. District Court for the Western District of South Carolina. New member elected September 14, 1915. Democratic hold.	▌ ✓ Samuel J. Nicholls (Democratic) 100%
New York 23	Joseph A. Goulden	Democratic	1912	Incumbent died May 3, 1915. New member elected November 2, 1915. Republican gain.	▌ ✓ William Bennet (Republican) 46.2%; ▌Ellsworth J. Healy (Democratic) 44.6%; ▌George Dobsevage (Socialist) 8.6%
New York 31	Edwin A. Merritt	Republican	1912 (special)	Incumbent died December 4, 1914. New member elected November 2, 1915. Republican hold.	▌ ✓ Bertrand Snell (Republican) 67.3%; ▌William L. Allen (Democratic) 23.6%; ▌Howard D. Hadley (Progressive) 5.0%; ▌Franklin D. Wallace (Prohibition) 3.5%
New York 36	Sereno E. Payne	Republican	1889 (special)	Incumbent died December 10, 1914. New member elected November 2, 1915. Republican hold.	▌ ✓ Norman J. Gould (Republican) 64.8%; ▌Louis J. Licht (Democratic) 29.7%; ▌Anson L. Gardner (Prohibition) 4.8%
Pennsylvania 24	Vacant			Rep.-elect William M. Brown (R) died January 31, 1915. New member elected November 3, 1915. Republican hold.	▌ ✓ Henry W. Temple (Republican) 65.6%; ▌Carl E. Gibson (Democratic) 22.3%; ▌W. K. Ramsey (Socialist) 8.1%; ▌A. S. Hunter (Prohibition) 4.1%
