= John Davidson Clark =

American lawyer

John Davidson Clark (September 26, 1884 – November 6, 1961) was an American antitrust lawyer and politician. He was a member of the Council of Economic Advisers from 1946 to 1953, including the last three years as Vice Chairman. Prior to joining the council, Clark served in the Wyoming Legislature.

A native of Fort Collins, Colorado, Clark graduated from the University of Nebraska in 1905, and earned a law degree from Columbia Law School in 1907. He began practicing law in Cheyenne, Wyoming, and became Director of American National Bank of Cheyenne in 1919. In 1931, he earned a doctorate from Johns Hopkins University with a dissertation on United States antitrust law.
