= Oklahoma's congressional delegations =

Map of Oklahoma's congressional districts since 2023

These are tables of congressional delegations from Oklahoma to the United States House of Representatives and the United States Senate.

The current dean of the Oklahoma delegation is Representative Frank Lucas (R), having served in Congress since 1994.

== U.S. House of Representatives ==
=== Current members ===
Current U.S. representatives from Oklahoma
District	Member (Residence)	Party	Incumbent since	CPVI (2025)	District map
1st	Kevin Hern (Tulsa)	Republican	November 13, 2018	R+11	
2nd	Josh Brecheen (Coalgate)	Republican	January 3, 2023	R+28	
3rd	Frank Lucas (Cheyenne)	Republican	May 10, 1994	R+23	
4th	Tom Cole (Moore)	Republican	January 3, 2003	R+17	
5th	Stephanie Bice (Oklahoma City)	Republican	January 3, 2021	R+9	

=== 1889–1907: one non-voting delegate ===
Congress	Delegate
51st (1889–1891)	David Archibald Harvey (R)
52nd (1891–1893)	David Archibald Harvey (R)
53rd (1893–1895)	Dennis Thomas Flynn (R)
54th (1895–1897)	Dennis Thomas Flynn (R)
55th (1897–1899)	James Yancy Callahan (Sv)
56th (1899–1901)	Dennis Thomas Flynn (R)
57th (1901–1903)	Dennis Thomas Flynn (R)
58th (1903–1905)	Bird S. McGuire (R)
59th (1905–1907)	Bird S. McGuire (R)

=== 1907–1915 ===
After the 1910 census, Oklahoma gained three seats. From 1913 to 1915, these extra seats were represented at-large.

Congress	District							
Congress	1st	2nd	3rd	4th	5th			
60th (1907–1909)	Bird S. McGuire (R)	Elmer L. Fulton (D)	James S. Davenport (D)	Charles D. Carter (D)	Scott Ferris (D)			
61st (1909–1911)	Bird S. McGuire (R)	Dick T. Morgan (R)	Charles E. Creager (R)	Charles D. Carter (D)	Scott Ferris (D)			
62nd (1911–1913)	Bird S. McGuire (R)	Dick T. Morgan (R)	James S. Davenport (D)	Charles D. Carter (D)	Scott Ferris (D)	At-large seats		
62nd (1911–1913)	Bird S. McGuire (R)	Dick T. Morgan (R)	James S. Davenport (D)	Charles D. Carter (D)	Scott Ferris (D)	Seat A	Seat B	Seat C
63rd (1913–1915)	Bird S. McGuire (R)	Dick T. Morgan (R)	James S. Davenport (D)	Charles D. Carter (D)	Scott Ferris (D)	William H. Murray (D)	Joseph B. Thompson (D)	Claude Weaver (D)

=== 1915–1963 ===
After 1915, all the seats were represented by districts. After the 1930 census, Oklahoma had its most seats, nine. The ninth seat represented the state at-large. After the 1940 census, the at-large seat was eliminated.

Congress	District								
Congress	1st	2nd	3rd	4th	5th	6th	7th	8th	
64th (1915–1917)	James S. Davenport (D)	William Wirt; Hastings (D)	Charles D. Carter (D)	William H. Murray (D)	Joseph B. Thompson (D)	Scott Ferris (D)	James V. McClintic (D)	Dick T. Morgan (R)	
65th (1917–1919)	Thomas A. Chandler (R)	William Wirt; Hastings (D)	Charles D. Carter (D)	Tom D. McKeown (D)	Joseph B. Thompson (D)	Scott Ferris (D)	James V. McClintic (D)	Dick T. Morgan (R)	
66th (1919–1921)	Everette B. Howard (D)	William Wirt; Hastings (D)	Charles D. Carter (D)	Tom D. McKeown (D)	Joseph B. Thompson (D)	Scott Ferris (D)	James V. McClintic (D)	Dick T. Morgan (R)	
66th (1919–1921)	Everette B. Howard (D)	William Wirt; Hastings (D)	Charles D. Carter (D)	Tom D. McKeown (D)	John W. Harreld (R)	Scott Ferris (D)	James V. McClintic (D)	Charles Swindall (R)	
67th (1921–1923)	Thomas A. Chandler (R)	Alice Robertson (R)	Charles D. Carter (D)	Joseph C. Pringley (R)	Fletcher B. Swank (D)	L. M. Gensman (R)	James V. McClintic (D)	Manuel Herrick (R)	
68th (1923–1925)	Everette B. Howard (D)	William Wirt; Hastings (D)	Charles D. Carter (D)	Tom D. McKeown (D)	Fletcher B. Swank (D)	Elmer Thomas (D)	James V. McClintic (D)	Milton C. Garber (R)	
69th (1925–1927)	Samuel J. Montgomery (R)	William Wirt; Hastings (D)	Charles D. Carter (D)	Tom D. McKeown (D)	Fletcher B. Swank (D)	Elmer Thomas (D)	James V. McClintic (D)	Milton C. Garber (R)	
70th (1927–1929)	Everette B. Howard (D)	William Wirt; Hastings (D)	Wilburn; Cartwright (D)	Tom D. McKeown (D)	Fletcher B. Swank (D)	Jed Johnson (D)	James V. McClintic (D)	Milton C. Garber (R)	
71st (1929–1931)	Charles O'Connor (R)	William Wirt; Hastings (D)	Wilburn; Cartwright (D)	Tom D. McKeown (D)	Ulysses S. Stone (R)	Jed Johnson (D)	James V. McClintic (D)	Milton C. Garber (R)	
72nd (1931–1933)	Wesley E. Disney (D)	William Wirt; Hastings (D)	Wilburn; Cartwright (D)	Tom D. McKeown (D)	Fletcher B. Swank (D)	Jed Johnson (D)	James V. McClintic (D)	Milton C. Garber (R)	At-large
73rd (1933–1935)	Wesley E. Disney (D)	William Wirt; Hastings (D)	Wilburn; Cartwright (D)	Tom D. McKeown (D)	Fletcher B. Swank (D)	Jed Johnson (D)	James V. McClintic (D)	E. W. Marland (D)	Will; Rogers (D)
74th (1935–1937)	Wesley E. Disney (D)	John C. Nichols (D)	Wilburn; Cartwright (D)	Percy Lee; Gassaway (D)	Joshua B. Lee (D)	Jed Johnson (D)	Sam C. Massingale (D)	Phil; Ferguson (D)	Will; Rogers (D)
75th (1937–1939)	Wesley E. Disney (D)	John C. Nichols (D)	Wilburn; Cartwright (D)	Lyle Boren (D)	Robert P. Hill (D)	Jed Johnson (D)	Sam C. Massingale (D)	Phil; Ferguson (D)	Will; Rogers (D)
75th (1937–1939)	Wesley E. Disney (D)	John C. Nichols (D)	Wilburn; Cartwright (D)	Lyle Boren (D)	Gomer G. Smith (D)	Jed Johnson (D)	Sam C. Massingale (D)	Phil; Ferguson (D)	Will; Rogers (D)
76th (1939–1941)	Wesley E. Disney (D)	John C. Nichols (D)	Wilburn; Cartwright (D)	Lyle Boren (D)	Mike; Monroney (D)	Jed Johnson (D)	Sam C. Massingale (D)	Phil; Ferguson (D)	Will; Rogers (D)
77th (1941–1943)	Wesley E. Disney (D)	John C. Nichols (D)	Wilburn; Cartwright (D)	Lyle Boren (D)	Mike; Monroney (D)	Jed Johnson (D)	Sam C. Massingale (D)	Ross Rizley (R)	Will; Rogers (D)
77th (1941–1943)	Wesley E. Disney (D)	John C. Nichols (D)	Wilburn; Cartwright (D)	Lyle Boren (D)	Mike; Monroney (D)	Jed Johnson (D)	Victor; Wickersham (D)	Ross Rizley (R)	Will; Rogers (D)
78th (1943–1945)	Wesley E. Disney (D)	William G. Stigler (D)	Paul; Stewart (D)	Lyle Boren (D)	Mike; Monroney (D)	Jed Johnson (D)	Victor; Wickersham (D)	Ross Rizley (R)	
79th (1945–1947)	George B. Schwabe (R)	William G. Stigler (D)	Paul; Stewart (D)	Lyle Boren (D)	Mike; Monroney (D)	Jed Johnson (D)	Victor; Wickersham (D)	Ross Rizley (R)	
80th (1947–1949)	George B. Schwabe (R)	William G. Stigler (D)	Carl; Albert (D)	Glen D. Johnson (D)	Mike; Monroney (D)	Toby; Morris (D)	Preston E. Peden (D)	Ross Rizley (R)	
81st (1949–1951)	Dixie Gilmer (D)	William G. Stigler (D)	Carl; Albert (D)	Tom Steed (D)	Mike; Monroney (D)	Toby; Morris (D)	Victor; Wickersham (D)	George H. Wilson (D)	
82nd (1951–1953)	George B. Schwabe (R)	William G. Stigler (D)	Carl; Albert (D)	Tom Steed (D)	John Jarman (D)	Toby; Morris (D)	Victor; Wickersham (D)	Page Belcher (R)	

=== 1953–present ===
Congress	1st district	2nd district	3rd district	4th district	5th district	6th district
83rd (1953–1955)	Page Belcher (R)	Ed Edmondson (D)	Carl Albert (D)	Tom Steed (D)	John Jarman (D)	Victor; Wickersham (D)
84th (1955–1957)	Page Belcher (R)	Ed Edmondson (D)	Carl Albert (D)	Tom Steed (D)	John Jarman (D)	Victor; Wickersham (D)
85th (1957–1959)	Page Belcher (R)	Ed Edmondson (D)	Carl Albert (D)	Tom Steed (D)	John Jarman (D)	Toby Morris (D)
86th (1959–1961)	Page Belcher (R)	Ed Edmondson (D)	Carl Albert (D)	Tom Steed (D)	John Jarman (D)	Toby Morris (D)
87th (1961–1963)	Page Belcher (R)	Ed Edmondson (D)	Carl Albert (D)	Tom Steed (D)	John Jarman (D)	Victor; Wickersham (D)
88th (1963–1965)	Page Belcher (R)	Ed Edmondson (D)	Carl Albert (D)	Tom Steed (D)	John Jarman (D)	Victor; Wickersham (D)
89th (1965–1967)	Page Belcher (R)	Ed Edmondson (D)	Carl Albert (D)	Tom Steed (D)	John Jarman (D)	Jed Johnson Jr. (D)
90th (1967–1969)	Page Belcher (R)	Ed Edmondson (D)	Carl Albert (D)	Tom Steed (D)	John Jarman (D)	James V. Smith (R)
91st (1969–1971)	Page Belcher (R)	Ed Edmondson (D)	Carl Albert (D)	Tom Steed (D)	John Jarman (D)	John Newbold; Camp (R)
92nd (1971–1973)	Page Belcher (R)	Ed Edmondson (D)	Carl Albert (D)	Tom Steed (D)	John Jarman (D)	John Newbold; Camp (R)
93rd (1973–1975)	James R. Jones (D)	Clem McSpadden (D)	Carl Albert (D)	Tom Steed (D)	John Jarman (D)	John Newbold; Camp (R)
94th (1975–1977)	James R. Jones (D)	Ted Risenhoover (D)	Carl Albert (D)	Tom Steed (D)	John Jarman (R)	Glenn English (D)
95th (1977–1979)	James R. Jones (D)	Ted Risenhoover (D)	Wes Watkins (D)	Tom Steed (D)	Mickey Edwards (R)	Glenn English (D)
96th (1979–1981)	James R. Jones (D)	Mike Synar (D)	Wes Watkins (D)	Tom Steed (D)	Mickey Edwards (R)	Glenn English (D)
97th (1981–1983)	James R. Jones (D)	Mike Synar (D)	Wes Watkins (D)	Dave McCurdy (D)	Mickey Edwards (R)	Glenn English (D)
98th (1983–1985)	James R. Jones (D)	Mike Synar (D)	Wes Watkins (D)	Dave McCurdy (D)	Mickey Edwards (R)	Glenn English (D)
99th (1985–1987)	James R. Jones (D)	Mike Synar (D)	Wes Watkins (D)	Dave McCurdy (D)	Mickey Edwards (R)	Glenn English (D)
100th (1987–1989)	Jim Inhofe (R)	Mike Synar (D)	Wes Watkins (D)	Dave McCurdy (D)	Mickey Edwards (R)	Glenn English (D)
101st (1989–1991)	Jim Inhofe (R)	Mike Synar (D)	Wes Watkins (D)	Dave McCurdy (D)	Mickey Edwards (R)	Glenn English (D)
102nd (1991–1993)	Jim Inhofe (R)	Mike Synar (D)	Bill Brewster (D)	Dave McCurdy (D)	Mickey Edwards (R)	Glenn English (D)
103rd (1993–1995)	Jim Inhofe (R)	Mike Synar (D)	Bill Brewster (D)	Dave McCurdy (D)	Ernest Istook (R)	Glenn English (D)
103rd (1993–1995)	Steve Largent (R)	Mike Synar (D)	Bill Brewster (D)	Dave McCurdy (D)	Ernest Istook (R)	Frank Lucas (R)
104th (1995–1997)	Steve Largent (R)	Tom Coburn (R)	Bill Brewster (D)	J. C. Watts (R)	Ernest Istook (R)	Frank Lucas (R)
105th (1997–1999)	Steve Largent (R)	Tom Coburn (R)	Wes Watkins (R)	J. C. Watts (R)	Ernest Istook (R)	Frank Lucas (R)
106th (1999–2001)	Steve Largent (R)	Tom Coburn (R)	Wes Watkins (R)	J. C. Watts (R)	Ernest Istook (R)	Frank Lucas (R)
107th (2001–2003)	Steve Largent (R)	Brad Carson (D)	Wes Watkins (R)	J. C. Watts (R)	Ernest Istook (R)	Frank Lucas (R)
107th (2001–2003)	John Sullivan (R)	Brad Carson (D)	Wes Watkins (R)	J. C. Watts (R)	Ernest Istook (R)	Frank Lucas (R)
108th (2003–2005)	John Sullivan (R)	Brad Carson (D)	Frank Lucas (R)	Tom Cole (R)	Ernest Istook (R)	
109th (2005–2007)	John Sullivan (R)	Dan Boren (D)	Frank Lucas (R)	Tom Cole (R)	Ernest Istook (R)	
110th (2007–2009)	John Sullivan (R)	Dan Boren (D)	Frank Lucas (R)	Tom Cole (R)	Mary Fallin (R)	
111th (2009–2011)	John Sullivan (R)	Dan Boren (D)	Frank Lucas (R)	Tom Cole (R)	Mary Fallin (R)	
112th (2011–2013)	John Sullivan (R)	Dan Boren (D)	Frank Lucas (R)	Tom Cole (R)	James Lankford (R)	
113th (2013–2015)	Jim Bridenstine (R)	Markwayne; Mullin (R)	Frank Lucas (R)	Tom Cole (R)	James Lankford (R)	
114th (2015–2017)	Jim Bridenstine (R)	Markwayne; Mullin (R)	Frank Lucas (R)	Tom Cole (R)	Steve Russell (R)	
115th (2017–2019)	Jim Bridenstine (R)	Markwayne; Mullin (R)	Frank Lucas (R)	Tom Cole (R)	Steve Russell (R)	
115th (2017–2019)	Kevin Hern (R)	Markwayne; Mullin (R)	Frank Lucas (R)	Tom Cole (R)	Steve Russell (R)	
116th (2019–2021)	Kevin Hern (R)	Markwayne; Mullin (R)	Frank Lucas (R)	Tom Cole (R)	Kendra Horn (D)	
117th (2021–2023)	Kevin Hern (R)	Markwayne; Mullin (R)	Frank Lucas (R)	Tom Cole (R)	Stephanie Bice (R)	
118th (2023–2025)	Kevin Hern (R)	Josh Brecheen (R)	Frank Lucas (R)	Tom Cole (R)	Stephanie Bice (R)	
119th (2025–2027)	Kevin Hern (R)	Josh Brecheen (R)	Frank Lucas (R)	Tom Cole (R)	Stephanie Bice (R)	
120th (2027–2029)	Mark Tedford (R)	Josh Brecheen (R)	Frank Lucas (R)	Tom Cole (R)	Stephanie Bice (R)	

== United States Senate ==
Current U.S. senators from Oklahoma
Oklahoma CPVI (2025): R+17	Class II senator	Class III senator
Oklahoma CPVI (2025): R+17	Alan Armstrong (junior senator) (Tulsa)	James Lankford (senior senator) (Oklahoma City)
Party	Republican	Republican
Incumbent since	March 24, 2026	January 3, 2015

Class II senator	Congress	Class III senator
Robert L. Owen (D)	60th (1907–1909)	Thomas Gore (D)
Robert L. Owen (D)	61st (1909–1911)	Thomas Gore (D)
Robert L. Owen (D)	62nd (1911–1913)	Thomas Gore (D)
Robert L. Owen (D)	63rd (1913–1915)	Thomas Gore (D)
Robert L. Owen (D)	64th (1915–1917)	Thomas Gore (D)
Robert L. Owen (D)	65th (1917–1919)	Thomas Gore (D)
Robert L. Owen (D)	66th (1919–1921)	Thomas Gore (D)
Robert L. Owen (D)	67th (1921–1923)	John W. Harreld (R)
Robert L. Owen (D)	68th (1923–1925)	John W. Harreld (R)
William B. Pine (R)	69th (1925–1927)	John W. Harreld (R)
William B. Pine (R)	70th (1927–1929)	Elmer Thomas (D)
William B. Pine (R)	71st (1929–1931)	Elmer Thomas (D)
Thomas Gore (D)	72nd (1931–1933)	Elmer Thomas (D)
Thomas Gore (D)	73rd (1933–1935)	Elmer Thomas (D)
Thomas Gore (D)	74th (1935–1937)	Elmer Thomas (D)
Joshua B. Lee (D)	75th (1937–1939)	Elmer Thomas (D)
Joshua B. Lee (D)	76th (1939–1941)	Elmer Thomas (D)
Joshua B. Lee (D)	77th (1941–1943)	Elmer Thomas (D)
Edward H. Moore (R)	78th (1943–1945)	Elmer Thomas (D)
Edward H. Moore (R)	79th (1945–1947)	Elmer Thomas (D)
Edward H. Moore (R)	80th (1947–1949)	Elmer Thomas (D)
Robert S. Kerr (D)	81st (1949–1951)	Elmer Thomas (D)
Robert S. Kerr (D)	82nd (1951–1953)	Mike Monroney (D)
Robert S. Kerr (D)	83rd (1953–1955)	Mike Monroney (D)
Robert S. Kerr (D)	84th (1955–1957)	Mike Monroney (D)
Robert S. Kerr (D)	85th (1957–1959)	Mike Monroney (D)
Robert S. Kerr (D)	86th (1959–1961)	Mike Monroney (D)
Robert S. Kerr (D)	87th (1961–1963)	Mike Monroney (D)
J. Howard; Edmondson (D)	88th (1963–1965)	Mike Monroney (D)
Fred R. Harris (D)	88th (1963–1965)	Mike Monroney (D)
Fred R. Harris (D)	89th (1965–1967)	Mike Monroney (D)
Fred R. Harris (D)	90th (1967–1969)	Mike Monroney (D)
Fred R. Harris (D)	91st (1969–1971)	Henry Bellmon (R)
Fred R. Harris (D)	92nd (1971–1973)	Henry Bellmon (R)
Dewey F. Bartlett (R)	93rd (1973–1975)	Henry Bellmon (R)
Dewey F. Bartlett (R)	94th (1975–1977)	Henry Bellmon (R)
Dewey F. Bartlett (R)	95th (1977–1979)	Henry Bellmon (R)
David Boren (D)	96th (1979–1981)	Henry Bellmon (R)
David Boren (D)	97th (1981–1983)	Don Nickles (R)
David Boren (D)	98th (1983–1985)	Don Nickles (R)
David Boren (D)	99th (1985–1987)	Don Nickles (R)
David Boren (D)	100th (1987–1989)	Don Nickles (R)
David Boren (D)	101st (1989–1991)	Don Nickles (R)
David Boren (D)	102nd (1991–1993)	Don Nickles (R)
David Boren (D)	103rd (1993–1995)	Don Nickles (R)
Jim Inhofe (R)	103rd (1993–1995)	Don Nickles (R)
Jim Inhofe (R)	104th (1995–1997)	Don Nickles (R)
Jim Inhofe (R)	105th (1997–1999)	Don Nickles (R)
Jim Inhofe (R)	106th (1999–2001)	Don Nickles (R)
Jim Inhofe (R)	107th (2001–2003)	Don Nickles (R)
Jim Inhofe (R)	108th (2003–2005)	Don Nickles (R)
Jim Inhofe (R)	109th (2005–2007)	Tom Coburn (R)
Jim Inhofe (R)	110th (2007–2009)	Tom Coburn (R)
Jim Inhofe (R)	111th (2009–2011)	Tom Coburn (R)
Jim Inhofe (R)	112th (2011–2013)	Tom Coburn (R)
Jim Inhofe (R)	113th (2013–2015)	Tom Coburn (R)
Jim Inhofe (R)	114th (2015–2017)	James Lankford (R)
Jim Inhofe (R)	115th (2017–2019)	James Lankford (R)
Jim Inhofe (R)	116th (2019–2021)	James Lankford (R)
Jim Inhofe (R)	117th (2021–2023)	James Lankford (R)
Markwayne Mullin (R)	118th (2023–2025)	James Lankford (R)
Markwayne Mullin (R)	119th (2025–2027)	James Lankford (R)
Alan Armstrong (R)	119th (2025–2027)	James Lankford (R)
Kevin Hern (R)	119th (2025–2027)	James Lankford (R)
Kevin Hern (R)	120th (2027–2029)	James Lankford (R)

== Key ==
Democratic (D)
Republican (R)
Silver (Sv)

== See also ==
- List of United States congressional districts
- Oklahoma's congressional districts
- Political party strength in Oklahoma
