= Will Rogers (Oklahoma politician) =

American politician (1898–1983)

Will C. Rogers
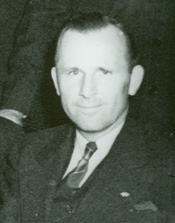

Member of the U.S. House of Representatives from Oklahoma's at-large district
- In office March 4, 1933 – January 3, 1943
- Preceded by: District created
- Succeeded by: District abolished

Personal details
- Born: William Cornelius Rogers; December 12, 1898 Bessie, Oklahoma Territory
- Died: August 3, 1983 (aged 84) Falls Church, Virginia
- Resting place: National Memorial Park
- Party: Democratic
- Education: Southwestern Teachers College; Central Teachers College; University of Oklahoma

Will Rogers (December 12, 1898 – August 3, 1983) was an American educator and politician who served five terms as a United States representative from Oklahoma from 1933 to 1943.

== Biography ==
Born on a farm near Bessie, Oklahoma Territory, son of John and Martha Ellen (Hatchett) Rogers, Rogers attended the public schools and Southwestern Teachers College in Weatherford, Oklahoma. He then attended Central Teachers College in Edmond, Oklahoma, graduating with a Bachelor of Science degree in 1926 and a Bachelor of Arts degree in 1929. He continued his education at the University of Oklahoma in Norman and received a Master of Science degree in 1930.

Rogers began his career as an educator by teaching in the public schools of Bessie, Oklahoma, from 1917 to 1919. He then became the principal of the public schools in Bartlesville, Oklahoma, and held that position until 1923. He was the superintendent of schools in several Oklahoma school districts from 1923 to 1932.

=== Congress ===
Rogers was elected as a Democrat to the 73rd and four succeeding Congresses (March 4, 1933 – January 3, 1943). He served as chairman of the Committee on Indian Affairs in the 74th through 77th Congresses. While serving as a Representative at-large, he was an unsuccessful candidate for nomination in 1941 to fill the vacancy caused by the death of Sam C. Massingale in the seventh district for the 77th Congress. He was not a candidate for renomination in 1942.

Rogers was admitted to the Oklahoma bar in 1942. He was an unsuccessful candidate for the Democratic nomination of Secretary of State of Oklahoma in 1943. He was employed by the Department of the Interior from 1943 to 1945. He served as assistant to the Secretary of Agriculture in Washington, D.C., in 1946 and 1947. He worked as a hearing examiner at the Department of Agriculture from May 1947 until his retirement in 1968.

=== Retirement and death ===
Following his retirement, Rogers engaged in building and real estate management. He was a resident of McLean, Virginia, until his death on August 3, 1983, in Falls Church, Virginia. He was cremated and his ashes were interred at National Memorial Park in Falls Church.

U.S. House of Representatives
Preceded by None	Member of the U.S. House of Representatives from Oklahoma's at-large congressional seat 1933–1943	Succeeded by At-large district eliminated
