= 4th Ohio Cavalry Regiment =

- Active: August 1861 to July 15, 1865
- Country: United States
- Allegiance: Union
- Branch: Cavalry
- Engagements: Battle of Stones River; Tullahoma Campaign; Battle of Chickamauga; Atlanta campaign Battle of Kennesaw Mountain; Siege of Atlanta; Garrard's Raid; Kilpatrick's Raid

The 4th Ohio Cavalry Regiment was a cavalry regiment that served in the Union Army during the American Civil War. The regiment was also known as the Union Dragoons and Cincinnati Union Dragoons.

== Service ==
The 4th Ohio Cavalry Regiment was organized at Cincinnati, Lima, and Camp Dennison near Cincinnati from August to November 1861, and mustered in for a three years under the command of Colonel John Kennett.

The regiment was attached to 3rd Division, Army of the Ohio, to October 1862. 2nd Brigade, Cavalry Division, Army of the Ohio, to November 1862. 2nd Brigade, Cavalry Division, Army of the Cumberland, to January 1863. 2nd Brigade, 1st Cavalry Division, Army of the Cumberland, to March 1863. 2nd Brigade, 2nd Cavalry Division, Army of the Cumberland, to October 1864. 2nd Brigade, 2nd Division, Cavalry Corps, Military Division Mississippi, to August 1865.

The 4th Ohio Cavalry mustered out of service on July 15, 1865.

== Detailed service ==
Moved to Camp Dennison, Ohio, November 23, thence to Jeffersonville, Ind., December 5, and to Bacon Creek, Ky., December 27. Action at Roan's Tan Yard, Silver Creek, Mo., January 8, 1862. Advance on Bowling Green, Ky., February 10–15, 1862. Occupation of Bowling Green February 15. Occupation of Nashville, Tenn., February 23. Action near Nashville March 8–9. Camp Jackson March 24. Reconnaissance to Shelbyville, Tullahoma and McMinnville March 25–28. Capture of Huntsville, Ala., April 11. Bridgeport, Ala., April 23. West Bridge, near Bridgeport, April 29. Shelbyville Road April 24. Tuscumbia April 25. Bolivar April 28. Pulaski May 11. Watkins' Ferry May 2. Athens May 8. Fayetteville May 14. Elk River May 20. Fayetteville May 26. Whitesburg, Ala., May 29. Huntsville June 4–5. Winchester, Tenn., June 10. Battle Creek June 21. Huntsville July 2. Stevenson, Ala., July 28. Bridgeport August 27 (detachment). Fort McCook, Battle Creek, August 27 (detachment). March to Louisville in pursuit of Bragg August 28-September 26. Huntsville September 1. Tyree Springs September 13. Glasgow, Ky., September 18. Pursuit of Bragg into Kentucky October 1–10. Bardstown Pike, near Mt. Washington, October 1. Frankfort October 9. Pursuit of Bragg from Perryville to London October 10–22. Lexington October 17–18. Bardstown and Pittman's Cross Roads October 19. Lawrenceburg October 25. Sandersville, Tenn., November 6. Reconnaissance from Rural Hill December 20. Near Nashville, Tenn., December 24. Advance on Murfreesboro December 26–30. Franklin December 26. Wilkinson's Cross Roads December 29. Near Murfreesboro December 29–30. Battle of Stones River December 30–31, 1862 and January 1–3, 1863. Overall's Creek December 31, 1862. Insane Asylum January 3, 1863. Shelbyville Pike January 5. Expedition to Auburn, Liberty and Alexandria February 3–5. Bradysville March 1. Expedition toward Columbia March 4–14. Rutherford Creek March 10–11. Expedition from Murfreesboro to Auburn, Liberty, Snow Hill, etc., April 2–6. Smith's Ford April 2. Snow Hill, Woodbury and Liberty April 3. Franklin April 10. Expedition to McMinnville April 20–30. Reconnaissance to Lavergne May 12. Expedition to Middleton and skirmishes May 21–22. Near Murfreesboro June 3. Expedition to Smithville June 4–5. Snow Hill June 4. Smithville June 5. Tullahoma Campaign June 23-July 7. Morris Ford, Elk River, July 2. Kelly's Ford July 2. Expedition to Huntsville July 13–22. Occupation of middle Tennessee until August 16. Passage of Cumberland Mountains and Tennessee River, and Chickamauga Campaign August 16-September 22. Reconnaissance from Stevenson, Ala., to Trenton, Ga., August 28–31. Alpine, Ga., September 3 and 8. Reconnaissance from Alpine toward Lafayette September 10. Battle of Chickamauga, September 19–21. Operations against Wheeler and Roddy September 30-October 17. McMinnville October 4. Farmington October 7. Sim's Farm, near Shelbyville, October 7. Farmington October 9. Maysville, Ala., November 4. Winchester November 22. Chattanooga-Ringgold Campaign November 23–27. Raid on East Tennessee & Georgia Railroad November 24–27. Charleston November 26. Cleveland November 27. March to relief of Knoxville, Tenn., November 28-December 8. Charleston, Tenn., December 28 (detachment). Expedition to Murphey, N. C., December 6–11. Expedition from Scottsboro, Ala., toward Rome, Ga., January 25-February 5, 1864. Ringgold, Ga., February 8. Demonstration on Dalton, Ga., February 22–27. Near Dalton February 23–24. Tunnel Hill, Buzzard's Roost Gap and Rocky Faced Ridge February 24–25. Scout to Dedmon's Trace April 10. Atlanta Campaign May 1-September 8, 1864. Courtland Road, Ala., May 26. Pond Springs, near Courtland, May 27. Moulton May 28–29. Operations about Marietta and against Kennesaw Mountain June 10-July 2. McAffee's Cross Roads June 11. Noonday Creek June 15–19 and 27. Near Marietta June 23. Assault on Kennesaw June 27. Nickajack Creek July 2–5. Rottenwood Creek July 4. Chattahoochie River July 5–17. Alpharetta July 10. Garrard's Raid to Covington July 22–24. Siege of Atlanta July 24-August 15. Garrard's Raid to South River July 27–31. Flat Rock Bridge and Lithonia July 28. Kilpatrick's Raid around Atlanta August 18–22. Red Oak and Flint River August 19. Jonesborough August 19. Lovejoy's Station August 20. Operations at Chattahoochie River Bridge August 26-September 2. Sandtown September 1. Ordered to Nashville, Tenn., September 21, thence to Louisville November 8, and duty there until January 1865. Moved to Gravelly Springs, Ala., January 12, and duty there until March. Wilson's Raid to Macon, Ga., March 22-April 24. Selma April 2. Montgomery April 12. Macon April 20. Duty at Macon until May 23, and at Nashville, Tenn., until July.

== Casualties ==
The regiment lost a total of 225 men during service; 5 officers and 50 enlisted men killed or mortally wounded, 1 officer and 169 enlisted men died of disease.

== Commanders ==
- Colonel John Kennett - resigned January 3, 1863
- Colonel Eli Long
- Major John L. Pugh - commanded at the battle of Stones River

== Notable members ==
- David Archibald Harvey, Judge in Kansas, and first Territorial Delegate from Oklahoma
- Captain James Ritty - inventor of the cash register
- Private Lucien Wulsin, Company A - partner of Dwight Hamilton Baldwin and later full owner of the Baldwin Piano Company
- Lieutenant-Colonel of Company A, Charles Dominick Welter. Went on to become second-in-command of the Chicago Police Department as Inspector and Secretary of Police in 1882, until his death in 1885.
- James Pike - scout and cavalryman who distinguished himself in actions behind enemy lines, and as a courier

== See also ==
- List of Ohio Civil War units
- Ohio in the Civil War
