= George B. Schwabe =

American politician (1886–1952)

George Schwabe
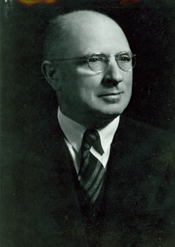
- George Schwabe, U.S. Congressman and Oklahoma House Speaker

Member of the U.S. House of Representatives from Oklahoma's 1st district
- In office January 3, 1951 – April 2, 1952
- Preceded by: Dixie Gilmer
- Succeeded by: Page Belcher
- In office January 3, 1945 – January 3, 1949
- Preceded by: Wesley E. Disney
- Succeeded by: Dixie Gilmer

9th Speaker of the Oklahoma House of Representatives
- In office 1921–1923
- Preceded by: Thomas C. Waldrep
- Succeeded by: Murray F. Gibbons

Member of the Oklahoma House of Representatives from Nowata County
- In office 1919–1923
- Preceded by: A. R. Garrett
- Succeeded by: Charles H. Baskin

Personal details
- Born: July 26, 1886 Arthur, Missouri, U.S.
- Died: April 2, 1952 (aged 65) Alexandria, Virginia, U.S.
- Party: Republican
- Spouses: Jeannette Eadie Simpson Schwabe; Barbara Yirsa McFarland Schwabe
- Education: University of Missouri
- Profession: Lawyer

George Blaine Schwabe (July 26, 1886 – April 2, 1952) was an American politician and a Republican U.S. congressman from Oklahoma.

== Biography ==
Schwabe was born in Arthur in Vernon County son of George Washington Schwabe and Emily Ellen (Mose) Schwabe. He attended public schools in his hometown. In 1910, he graduated from the law department at the University of Missouri. He was admitted to the bar the same year and began to practice law in Columbia, Missouri.

== Career ==
In 1911, Schwabe moved to Nowata, Oklahoma, and began to practice law there. He successfully ran for mayor of Nowata and served in that capacity during 1913 and 1914. On June 10, 1914, he married Jeannette Eadie Simpson and they had five children. After Jeannette died in 1939, he married Barbara Yirsa McFarland on July 23, 1943.

He began his service in state government in 1918 when he represented Nowata County, Oklahoma, in the State House of Representatives. He served as House Speaker in 1921 and 1922. He was the first Republican to serve in this capacity.

Following his term in the State House, he moved to Tulsa, Oklahoma, and stepped away from public service while continuing to practice law. From 1928 to 1936, he was the chairman of the Republican county committee.

In 1944, he decided to return to politics when he successfully ran for Congress, representing Oklahoma's 1st congressional district. From January 3, 1945, to January 3, 1949, he served in the 79th and 80th United States Congress, losing to Dixie Gilmer in 1948. He was reelected in 1950 to serve in the 82nd United States Congress from January 3, 1951, until his death. During his time in office, he served on the Appropriations Committee.

== Death ==
On April 2, 1952, while still in office, Schwabe died of a heart attack at age 65 years, 251 days, in Alexandria, Virginia. He is interred at Memorial Park Cemetery, Tulsa, Oklahoma.

== See also ==
- List of members of the United States Congress who died in office (1950–1999)

Political offices
Preceded by Thomas C. Waldrep	Speaker of the Oklahoma House of Representatives; 1921–1923	Succeeded by Murray F. Gibbons
U.S. House of Representatives
Preceded by Wesley E. Disney	Member of the U.S. House of Representatives from Oklahoma's 1st congressional district 1945–1949	Succeeded by Dixie Gilmer
Preceded by Dixie Gilmer	Member of the U.S. House of Representatives from Oklahoma's 1st congressional district 1951–1952	Succeeded by Page Belcher
