= Glen D. Johnson Jr. =

American academic and politician (born 1954)

8th Chancellor of the Oklahoma State System of Higher Education
- In office January 1, 2007 – September 30, 2021
- Preceded by: Paul G. Risser
- Succeeded by: Allison Garrett

President of Southeastern Oklahoma State University
- In office July 1997 – December 2006
- Preceded by: Larry Williams
- Succeeded by: Michael Turner

39th Speaker of the Oklahoma House of Representatives
- In office 1991–1997
- Preceded by: Steve Lewis
- Succeeded by: Loyd Benson

Member of the Oklahoma House of Representatives from the 24th district
- In office 1982–1997
- Preceded by: Bill Robinson
- Succeeded by: Dale Turner

Personal details
- Born: April 20, 1954 (age 72) Oklahoma City, Oklahoma, U.S.
- Party: Democratic
- Education: University of Oklahoma; OU College of Law
- Occupation: Lawyer, educator, politician

Glen D. Johnson Jr. (born April 20, 1954) is the former Oklahoma Speaker of the House of Representatives and former Chancellor of the Oklahoma State System of Higher Education, succeeded by Allison Garrett a state system of colleges and universities in Oklahoma. In 1996, Johnson was the Democratic party nominee for US Congress in the Second Congressional District of Oklahoma, defeated by Tom Coburn.

== Early life and education ==
Born in Oklahoma City, Johnson is the son of former U.S. Congressman Glen D. Johnson Sr. and Imogene Johnson. He graduated from Muskogee High School in 1972. He completed his bachelor's degree in political science at the University of Oklahoma and then obtained his Juris Doctor from the Oklahoma City University School of Law. During his college years, he was a member of the Phi Beta Kappa Society and is currently serves on the National Foundation board of directors of the Alpha Tau Omega fraternity.

== Career ==
Johnson founded Oklahoma Foundation for Excellence in 1986 and previously was a member of the Oklahoma Hall of Fame's Executive Board of Directors and the Oklahoma State Fair Board of Directors respectively.

From 1982 to 1996, Johnson was a member of the Oklahoma House of Representatives, and, in 1990, became Speaker of the State House at age 36, the youngest in the state's history (at the time). Johnson is the 8th Chancellor of the Oklahoma State System of Higher Education having assumed the position in January, 2007. He previously served ten years as the 16th president of Southeastern Oklahoma State University in Durant, Oklahoma. In 2012, Johnson was elected to the Southern Regional Education Board of which he still a vice chairman. In 2014, the Association of Governing Boards of Universities and Colleges have appointed Johnson to its Council of Presidents and the same year he was elected to the State Higher Education Executive Officers' Executive Committee.

In 2019, Johnson announced his retirement, which began in fall of 2020.

== Personal life ==
Glen Johnson Jr. lives in Oklahoma City with his wife Melinda Pierce, a school teacher at Edmond Memorial High School. Johnson was inducted into the Oklahoma Hall of Fame in 2006 and ten years later was also inducted into the Oklahoma Higher Education Hall of Fame. Johnson was succeeded as president of the Durant campus by Michael D. Turner.

Political offices
Preceded by	Member of the Oklahoma House of Representatives; 1982–1997	Succeeded by
Preceded by Steve Lewis	Speaker of the Oklahoma House of Representatives; 1991–1997	Succeeded by Lloyd L. Benson
Preceded by Larry Williams	President of Southeastern Oklahoma State University; 1997–2007	Succeeded by Michael Turner
Preceded by Paul G. Risser	Chancellor of the Oklahoma State Regents for Higher Education; 2007 – 2021	Succeeded by Allison Garrett
