= Lon Morris (politician) =

American politician

Member of the Oklahoma House of Representatives from the Cotton County district
- In office November 1918 – November 1920
- Preceded by: District established
- Succeeded by: Leroy Elmore

Personal details
- Born: Texas, U.S.
- Died: 1935
- Party: Democratic Party
- Children: 3, including Toby Morris

Lon Morris was an American politician who served in the Oklahoma House of Representatives representing Cotton County from 1918 to 1920.

== Biography ==
Lon Morris was born in Texas, the son of Burrell W. Morris. He served as the county attorney for Hood County, Texas, before moving to Oklahoma in 1906. He married Ida Henerson and the couple had three children, including Toby Morris.

Morris served in the Oklahoma House of Representatives as a member of the Democratic Party representing Cotton County from 1918 to 1920. He was the inaugural member of the district and succeeded by Leroy Elmore. He died in 1935.
