= Wolf, Oklahoma =

- Unincorporated community
- Location within Oklahoma
- Coordinates: 35°05′15″N 96°39′31″W
- Country: United States
- State: Oklahoma
- County: Seminole
- Elevation: 965 ft (294 m)
- Time zone: UTC-6 (Central (CST))
  - Summer (DST): UTC-5 (CDT)
- Area code: 405
- GNIS feature ID: 1099937

Wolf is an unincorporated community in Seminole County, Oklahoma, United States. Wolf is west-southwest of Wewoka, Oklahoma, the county seat, and less than five miles south of Bowlegs, Oklahoma. It is located east of the concurrent US-377/OK-99, as well as east of Old State Highway 99, on EW1330 Rd. It had a post office from February 25, 1903 to September 14, 1907.

== Notable person ==
- Lyle Boren - worked as a school teacher in Wolf prior to serving in the United States Congress from 1937 to 1947.
