= Tom Steed =

American politician (1904–1983)

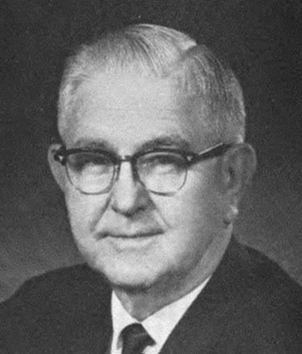

Member of the U.S. House of Representatives from Oklahoma's 4th district
- In office January 3, 1949 – January 3, 1981
- Preceded by: Glen D. Johnson
- Succeeded by: Dave McCurdy

Personal details
- Born: March 2, 1904 Eastland County, Texas, U.S.
- Died: June 8, 1983 (aged 79) Shawnee, Oklahoma, U.S.
- Party: Democratic
- Spouse: Hazel Bennett Steed
- Children: Roger Steed Richard Steed
- Profession: journalist, newspaper editor, politician

Military service
- Allegiance: United States
- Branch/service: United States Army
- Years of service: 1942–1944
- Rank: Private Second Lieutenant
- Unit: Anti-aircraft Artillery

Thomas Jefferson Steed (March 2, 1904 – June 8, 1983) was an American politician and a U.S. Congressman from Oklahoma.

== Early life ==
Steed was born on a farm near in Eastland County, Texas (near Rising Star, Texas) on March 2, 1904. His family later moved to Oklahoma, where he attended school (in Konawa, Oklahoma). After only one semester of high school, he began working for the Ada Evening News. He married Hazel Bennett in 1923, and they had two children, Roger and Richard. Roger was a Marine second lieutenant and fighter pilot and was killed in China in 1947.

== Career ==
Continuing to work in journalism, Steed worked for a number of Oklahoma newspapers including the Daily Oklahoman. Beginning in 1935 he served as an assistant to three of Oklahoma's U.S. congressmen, Percy Lee Gassaway, Robert P. Hill, and Gomer Griffith Smith. In 1938 he returned to Oklahoma and became managing editor of the Shawnee News-Star.

== Military service ==
After the outbreak of World War II, Steed enlisted in the U.S. Army on October 29, 1942, and was assigned to the Anti-aircraft Artillery. Steed was released from active duty in May 1944 with rank of Second Lieutenant. Steed continued his contribution to the U.S. war effort when he joined the Office of War Information on July 1, 1944. Steed also served with the information division in India-Burma Theater until December 1945. He often stated that his experience in journalism, the military and in the U.S. Congress had taught him "knowledge is power".

== Political career ==
Steed ran for Congress in 1948 and was elected as a Democrat, taking office on January 3, 1949. He was re-elected in 1950, and was continuously re-elected until 1980, when he decided to retire. (That year, he also received one vote for president at the 1980 Democratic National Convention.) Steed's final congressional race in 1978 was successful although he faced a spirited challenge in the Democratic primary election from M.E. "Cuffie" Waid, a popular Lawton optometrist and Chamber of Commerce leader. He served a total of 32 years in Congress, longer than any other Oklahoman in Congress at the time, and left office on January 3, 1981. While in Congress, he sat on the Education and Labor, Public Works, Appropriations, and Small Business committees, briefly chairing this last committee during the Ninety-fourth Congress. He also served as chair of the Subcommittee on the Treasury, Postal Service, and General Government and of the Subcommittee on Taxation and Oil Imports.

Steed did not sign the 1956 Southern Manifesto, and voted in favor of the Civil Rights Acts of 1957, 1960, 1964, as well as the 24th Amendment to the U.S. Constitution and the Voting Rights Act of 1965, but not the Civil Rights Act of 1968. While serving as a congressman, Steed's voting record was a mostly liberal one.

During the 1976 United States presidential election, despite being a member of the Democratic Party and an incumbent member of Congress, he supported the Republican ticket headed by President Gerald Ford and Senator Bob Dole, and appeared at a Ford campaign event in Lawton, Oklahoma.

== Accomplishments in office ==
According to the Encyclopedia of Oklahoma History and Culture, Steed's accomplishments while serving in Congress included:

- Conducting hearings on price wars affecting the dairy and retail petroleum industries;
- Cosponsored the Upstream Conservation Act, enacted in 1954;
- Joined with Sen. Robert S. Kerr to realize the Arkansas River Navigation System;
- Cosponsored the 1956 Library Services Act, which established the bookmobile system;
- Brought the Postal Service Institute to Norman, Oklahoma in 1968;
- Helped obtain funds for the education center at Rose State College and the Gordon Cooper Vocational Education School in Shawnee.

== Death and legacy ==
Steed returned to Oklahoma and resided in Shawnee, where he remained until his death on June 8, 1983 (age 79 years, 98 days). He is interred at Resthaven Cemetery in Shawnee, Oklahoma. After his death, a portion of Interstate 40 near Shawnee was renamed the "Tom Steed Memorial Highway." Tom Steed Reservoir near Mountain Park is also named after him.

== See also ==
- Politics of Oklahoma
- Oklahoma Democratic Party
- Oklahoma Congressional Districts

U.S. House of Representatives
| Preceded by Glen D. Johnson | Member of the U.S. House of Representatives from Oklahoma's 4th congressional district 1949–1981 | Succeeded by Dave McCurdy |
