= Eli Long =

Union Army general

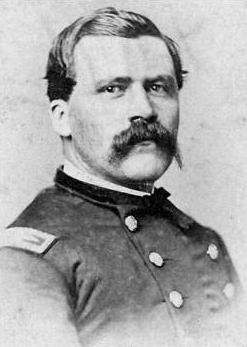
- Eli Long
- Born: June 16, 1837; Woodford County, Kentucky
- Died: January 5, 1903 (aged 65); Plainfield, New Jersey
- Burial place: Hillside Cemetery, Plainfield, New Jersey
- Military career
- Allegiance: United States of America; Union
- Branch: United States Army; Union Army
- Service years: 1856–1867
- Rank: Brigadier General; Major General
- Commands: 4th Ohio Cavalry; 2nd Division, Cavalry Corps, Military Division of Mississippi
- Conflicts: Indian Wars American Civil War: Tullahoma Campaign; Battle of Stones River; Battle of Chickamauga; Battle of Selma

Eli Long (June 16, 1837 – January 5, 1903) was a general in the Union Army during the American Civil War.

== Early life ==
Long was born on June 16, 1837, in Woodford County, Kentucky, and graduated from the Kentucky Military Institute in 1855. In 1856, he was appointed second lieutenant in the 1st U.S. Cavalry Regiment, serving in a variety of frontier outposts and occasionally battling hostile Indians. He was promoted to first lieutenant on March 1, 1861.

== American Civil War ==
Long served in the Western Theater of the American Civil War. At the outset of the war, on May 24, 1861, Long was promoted to captain in the 1st U.S. Cavalry. On August 3, 1861, he was transferred to the 4th U.S. Cavalry Regiment. On December 31, 1862, Long was wounded in the left shoulder at the Battle of Stones River while commanding Company K of the regiment.

On February 23, 1863, Long was appointed colonel of the 4th Ohio Cavalry, a regiment which recently had surrendered to the Confederate raider, Brigadier General John Hunt Morgan. Long improved the morale of the regiment and led it in the Tullahoma Campaign. He commanded the regiment's brigade, the 2nd Brigade, 2nd Division, Cavalry Corps of the Department of the Cumberland between March 1863 and August 20, 1864, including service at the Battle of Chickamauga. Long was wounded in the left side at the Battle of Farmington, Tennessee, October 7, 1863. He was distinguished in the Atlanta campaign where he suffered a head wound at the Battle of Jonesboro, Georgia, August 20, 1864, and wounds in the right arm and right thigh at the Battle of Lovejoy's Station, Georgia, August 21, 1864. Long received brevet grade appointments as major, lieutenant colonel, and colonel in the Regular Army of the United States for "gallant and meritorious services" at the Battle of Farmington and Battle of Fort Sanders (Knoxville) in Tennessee and Battle of Lovejoy's Station in Georgia, respectively.

On August 18, 1864, President Abraham Lincoln appointed Long a brigadier general in the volunteer army to rank from the same date. The President submitted the nomination to the U.S. Senate on December 12, 1864, and the U.S. Senate confirmed the appointment on February 14, 1865. Between November 16, 1864, and April 2, 1865, Long commanded the 2nd Division of the Cavalry Corps of the Military Division of Mississippi under Major General James H. Wilson. On April 2, 1865, during Wilson's Raid, Long was severely wounded in the head at the Battle of Selma, Alabama. During that battle he led the 2nd Division in a charge upon the entrenchments that resulted in the capture of that town.

During the Civil War, Long was wounded five times and also cited for gallantry five times. On January 13, 1866, President Andrew Johnson nominated Long for appointment to the brevet grade of major general of volunteers, to rank from March 13, 1865, and the U.S. Senate confirmed the appointment on March 12, 1866.

== Aftermath ==
Long was mustered out of the volunteer service on January 15, 1866 On April 10, 1866, President Andrew Johnson nominated Long for appointment to the brevet grade of brigadier general in the Regular Army of the United States, to rank from March 13, 1865, for gallantry at the Battle of Selma, and the U.S. Senate confirmed the appointment on May 4, 1866. On July 17, 1866, President Andrew Johnson nominated Long for appointment to the brevet grade of major general in the Regular Army, to rank from March 13, 1865, for his services during the war, and the U.S. Senate confirmed the appointment on July 23, 1866.

After recovering from the wound suffered at the Battle of Selma, Long was assigned to command the Military District of New Jersey. Long retired from the U.S. Army with the full rank of major general, USA, on August 16, 1867. He then lived in Plainfield, New Jersey, earning a living as a lawyer and borough recorder. He died on January 5, 1903, after an operation in a New York City hospital. Eli Long is buried in Hillside Cemetery at Plainfield.

== See also ==
- List of American Civil War generals (Union)
