= Claude Weaver =

American politician and judge

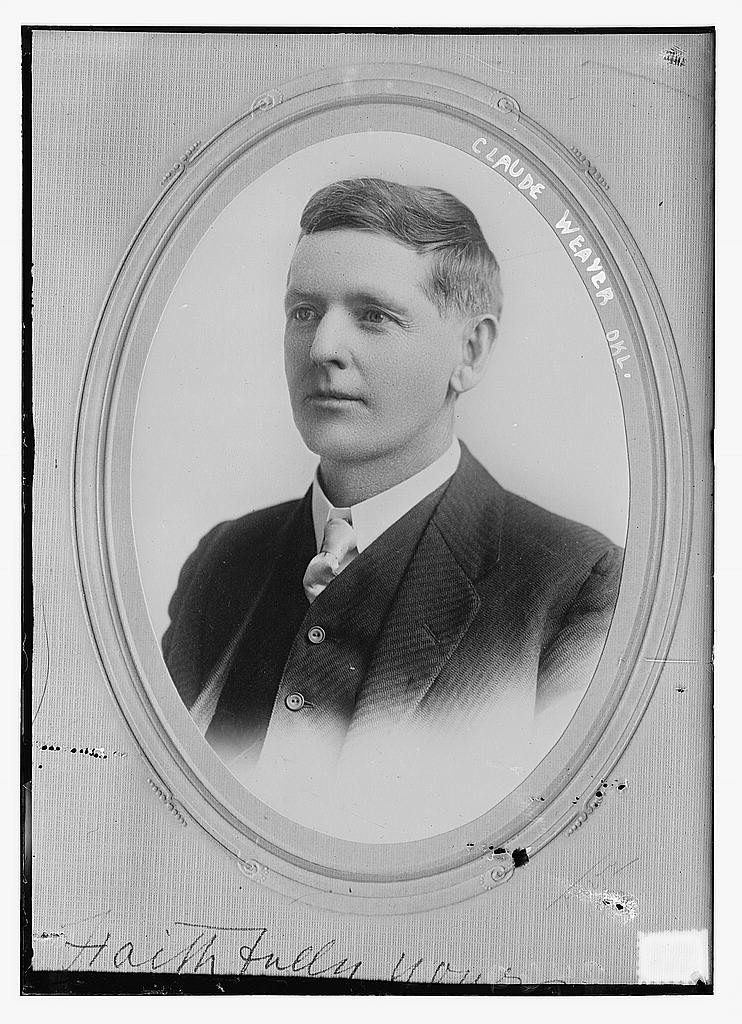
- Claude Weaver, between 1910 and 1915

Member of the U.S. House of Representatives from Oklahoma's at-large district
- In office March 4, 1913 – March 3, 1915
- Preceded by: Seat added
- Succeeded by: Seat eliminated

Personal details
- Born: March 19, 1867 Gainesville, Texas, U.S.
- Died: May 19, 1954 (aged 87) Oklahoma City, Oklahoma, U.S.
- Citizenship: United States
- Party: Democratic Party
- Spouse: Leila Ada Reinhardt Weaver
- Children: Claude Weaver; Floy Weaver; Amelia Weaver; Barbara Weaver; Lucy Weaver
- Education: University of Texas at Austin
- Profession: Attorney; politician; judge

Claude Weaver (March 19, 1867 – May 19, 1954) was an American politician, judge, and U.S. Representative from Oklahoma.

== Biography ==
Born in Gainesville, Texas, Weaver was the son of W. T. G. and Nancy Wilkin Fletcher Weaver, and attended the public schools. He graduated from the law department of the University of Texas at Austin in 1887 and was admitted to the bar the same year. He married Leila Ada Reinhardt, and they had five children: Floy, Amelia, Barbara, Lucy, and Claude Jr.

== Career ==
Weaver practiced in Gainesville, Texas, from 1887 to 1895, serving as assistant prosecuting attorney of Cooke County, Texas, in 1892. He moved to Pauls Valley, Indian Territory, in 1895 and resumed the practice of law. In 1910, he moved to Oklahoma City, Oklahoma, once again resuming his practice. There he served as member of Oklahoma City Board of Freeholders in 1910.

Elected as a Democrat to the Sixty-third Congress, Weaver served from March 4, 1913, to March 3, 1915. He was an unsuccessful candidate for renomination in 1914 and for election to fill a vacancy in the Sixty-sixth Congress in 1919. He became Postmaster of Oklahoma City, Oklahoma from 1915 to 1923.

Weaver served as acting county attorney of Oklahoma County in 1926. He was legal adviser and secretary to the Governor, William H. Murray from 1931 to 1934, and district judge of thirteenth Oklahoma district in 1934 and 1935.

== Death ==
Weaver died in Oklahoma City, Oklahoma, on May 19, 1954, at the age of 87 years, 62 days. He is interred at Fairlawn Cemetery in Oklahoma City.

U.S. House of Representatives
Preceded by None	Member of the U.S. House of Representatives from Oklahoma's at-large congressional seat 1913–1915	Succeeded by At-large district eliminated
