= Glen D. Johnson =

American lawyer and politician (1911-1983)

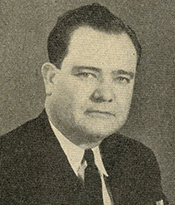

Member of the U.S. House of Representatives from Oklahoma's 4th district
- In office January 3, 1947 – January 3, 1949
- Preceded by: Lyle Boren
- Succeeded by: Tom Steed

Personal details
- Born: Glen Dale Johnson; September 11, 1911 Melbourne, Arkansas, US
- Died: February 10, 1983 (aged 71) Okemah, Oklahoma, US
- Party: Democratic
- Spouse: Imogene Storms Johnson
- Children: Glen D. Johnson Jr.
- Education: University of Oklahoma College of Law
- Profession: Attorney; politician

Military service
- Allegiance: United States
- Branch/service: United States Army
- Years of service: 1942–1946
- Rank: Captain
- Battles/wars: World War II

Glen Dale Johnson (September 11, 1911 – February 10, 1983), was an American World War II veteran, lawyer and politician who served as a Democratic Party member of the United States House of Representatives from Oklahoma for one term from 1947 to 1949.

== Early life ==
Johnson was born in Melbourne, Arkansas (a small town located in Izard County) on September 11, 1911, son to Willie and Jeffie Johnson. In 1920, the family relocated to Paden, Oklahoma, where he attended the public schools. He received a bachelor’s degree from Louisiana State University in 1935. While there he met Rose McConnell Long, widow of the slain Huey Long, who replaced her husband in the United States Senate. Mrs. Long hired Johnson as her secretary, a position he held for nine months. He graduated from the University of Oklahoma Law School at Norman in 1939; he was admitted to the bar the same year and began his law practice in Okemah.

== Career ==
Johnson was elected to the Oklahoma House of Representatives in 1940 and re-elected in 1942.

=== World War II ===
He resigned from the Oklahoma House in January, 1942 to enlist in the United States Army following the Japanese attack on Pearl Harbor and the U.S. entry into World War II. On a three-day pass, he married Imogene Storms in Okemah on December 5, 1942. While he entered the Army as a private, in May 1946 he was discharged as a captain.

Upon his return to Oklahoma, he resumed his practice of law.

=== Congress ===
Johnson was elected to Congress (from Oklahoma's 4th Congressional district) as a Democrat in 1946, defeating five-term incumbent Lyle Boren in the primary election, and served from January 3, 1947, to January 3, 1949. Johnson made it into the runoff primary with only 24% of the vote but then blew Boren away with 61%. The success may have gone to his head as he chose to run for the U.S. Senate rather than reelection, losing the Democratic nomination with a poor 6.8%. In 1950 Johnson tried to return to the House, but managed only 26% in the primary against the incumbent. He was noted in his one term in the House for his effort to organize new members, his xenophobia, and his passionate defense of due process. He was not notable for his attendance, missing 29% of key votes.

=== Later career ===
After leaving Congress, Johnson continued to work in the field of law. He was the neutral arbitrator for the National Mediation Board in 1949 and 1950. He served as an attorney in the Office of the Solicitor for the U.S. Department of the Interior in Washington, D.C., from 1961 to 1967. He was the chairman of the Oil Import Appeals Board (representing the Department of the Interior) from 1967 to 1969. He served as the attorney in the Solicitor's Office, Department of the Interior, assigned to the Muskogee, Oklahoma field office (from 1969 to 1972).

He relocated back to Okemah, Oklahoma, where he remained until his death.

== Death and personal life ==
Johnson died of congestive heart failure in Okemah, Okfuskee County, Oklahoma, on February 10, 1983.

Johnson and his wife Imogene had a son, Glen D. Johnson Jr., who served as Oklahoma's youngest Speaker of the House, then served in higher education—for ten years as president of Southeastern Oklahoma State University, then as chancellor of Oklahoma's state system of higher education. His death was just three weeks after his son was sworn in as a member of the Oklahoma House of Representatives.

== See also ==
- Politics of Oklahoma
- Oklahoma Democratic Party
- Oklahoma Congressional Districts
- Lyle Boren
- Tom Steed
- Glen D. Johnson Jr.

U.S. House of Representatives
| Preceded by Lyle Boren | Member of the U.S. House of Representatives from Oklahoma's 4th congressional district 1947-1949 | Succeeded by Tom Steed |
