= Toby Morris (politician) =

American politician

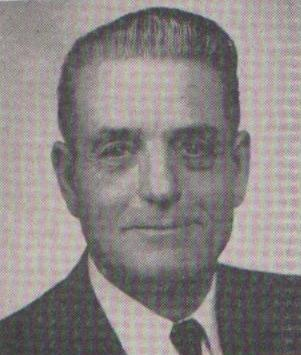

Member of the U.S. House of Representatives from Oklahoma's 6th district
- In office January 3, 1947 – January 3, 1953
- Preceded by: Jed Johnson, Sr.
- Succeeded by: Victor Wickersham
- In office January 3, 1957 – January 3, 1961
- Preceded by: Victor Wickersham
- Succeeded by: Victor Wickersham

Personal details
- Born: February 28, 1899 Granbury, Texas, United States
- Died: September 1, 1973 (aged 74) Lawton, Oklahoma
- Party: Democratic
- Spouse: Ola Baker Morris
- Parent: Lon Morris (father)

Military service
- Allegiance: United States of America
- Branch/service: United States Army
- Rank: private corporal sergeant
- Unit: 110th Combat Engineers, attached to the 35th Division
- Battles/wars: World War I

Toby Morris (February 28, 1899 – September 1, 1973) was an American politician and a U.S. Representative from Oklahoma.

== Biography ==
Born in Granbury, Texas, Morris was the son of Lon Morris and Ida Henderson Morris. The family moved to what was then Comanche County, Oklahoma, in 1906 and to Walters, Oklahoma, in 1913. He attended the public schools. He married Ola Baker in 1917, and they had two children.

== Career ==
Leaving high school in his senior year, during World War I, to enlist in the United States Army, Morris served successively as private, corporal, and sergeant with the 110th Combat Engineers, attached to the 35th Division, from October 1917 to May 1919.

Morris studied law and was admitted to the bar in 1920. He was a court clerk of Cotton County, Oklahoma from 1921 to 1925 and a prosecuting attorney from 1925 to 1929. He began the private practice of law in Walters, Oklahoma, in 1929. He served as district judge of the twenty-first judicial district of Oklahoma from 1937 to 1946.

Morris ran for Congress three times before getting the Democratic nomination in 1946. Elected to the 80th and to the two succeeding Congresses, Morris served from January 3, 1947, to January 3, 1953. He was an unsuccessful candidate for renomination in 1952 to the 83rd Congress and served as district judge of the fifth judicial district of Oklahoma from January 1955 to December 1956. He was elected to the 85th and to the 86th Congresses, serving from January 3, 1957, to January 3, 1961.

Morris was a small-d Democrat, a protector of civil liberties and unconvinced of an imminent threat to the country of communism. This also fed into his isolationism, seeing no need to fund American aid abroad to counteract communist efforts. Still, conforming to Border State attitudes, he voted against the Civil Rights Acts of 1957 and 1960. Also, as befits an Oklahoman, he advocated for Indians. All five of his enacted public bills and all thirteen of his accepted floor amendments were about Indians.

An unsuccessful candidate for renomination in 1960 to the 87th Congress, Morris served as judge for the Oklahoma State Industrial Court from July 1, 1961, to July 17, 1963. He served as district judge for the State of Oklahoma, retiring in January 1971.

== Death ==
After retirement, Morris resided in Lawton, Oklahoma, where he died on September 1, 1973 (age 74 years, 185 days). He is interred at Sunset Memorial Gardens in Lawton.

U.S. House of Representatives
Preceded by Jed Johnson, Sr.	Member of the U.S. House of Representatives from Oklahoma's 6th congressional district 1947–1953	Succeeded by Victor Wickersham
Preceded by Victor Wickersham	Member of the U.S. House of Representatives from Oklahoma's 6th congressional district 1957–1961	Succeeded by Victor Wickersham
