= Preston E. Peden =

American politician

Preston Elmer Peden
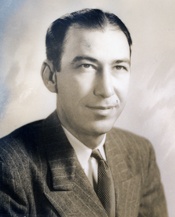

Member of the U.S. House of Representatives from Oklahoma's 7th district
- In office January 3, 1947 – January 3, 1949
- Preceded by: Victor Wickersham
- Succeeded by: Victor Wickersham

Personal details
- Born: June 28, 1914 Duke, Oklahoma, United States
- Died: June 27, 1985 (aged 70) Walnut Creek, California
- Party: Democratic
- Spouse: Ursula Wendt Peden
- Education: University of Oklahoma
- Profession: Attorney

Military service
- Allegiance: United States of America
- Branch/service: United States Army
- Years of service: 1942–1946
- Rank: Captain
- Battles/wars: World War II
- Awards: Bronze Star

Preston Elmer Peden (June 28, 1914 – June 27, 1985) was an American politician and a U.S. Representative from Oklahoma.

== Early life and education ==
Born in Duke, Oklahoma, Peden moved to Altus, Oklahoma, in 1920. Following his public school education, he attended the University of Oklahoma at Norman, Oklahoma, receiving his A.B. in 1936, and from the law school of the same university, his LL.B. in 1939.

== Career ==
Peden was admitted to the bar in 1939 and commenced the practice of law in Altus, Oklahoma. He became the Attorney for the State Insurance Fund of the State of Oklahoma (1939–1942).

He enlisted in June 1942 as a private in the United States Army. He was promoted through the ranks to Captain, being discharged May 5, 1946, and was awarded Bronze Star. He married German nurse Ursula Wendt on December 24, 1945, in Bavaria, and they had four children. His eldest was son Robert, followed by daughters Marsha & Gretchen & youngest son Thomas, who was always referred to as "stam" as in 'stampeden' . While serving overseas Peden sent a notification and declaration for the office of Congressman to the election board and subsequently received the nomination.

Peden was elected as a Democrat to the 80th Congress (January 3, 1947 – January 3, 1949),. He took the primary from the incumbent and lost renomination to him in 1948. It was only then that he made public his marriage to a German. He served as staff member of the Public Lands Committee of the United States House of Representatives in May 1949. He was appointed Alaskan regional counsel, Bureau of Land Management, Department of the Interior, in 1950 and Counsel to House Committee on Interior and Insular Affairs 1950-1952. He served as director of governmental affairs of the Chicago Association of Commerce and Industry from 1954 to 1980, while a resident of La Grange, Illinois.

== Death ==
Peden moved to Walnut Creek, California, and lived there until his death on June 27, 1985, (age 70 years, 364 days). His burial location is unknown.

U.S. House of Representatives
Preceded by Victor Wickersham	Member of the U.S. House of Representatives from Oklahoma's 7th congressional district 1947-1949	Succeeded by Victor Wickersham
