= Lyle Boren =

American politician (1909–1992)

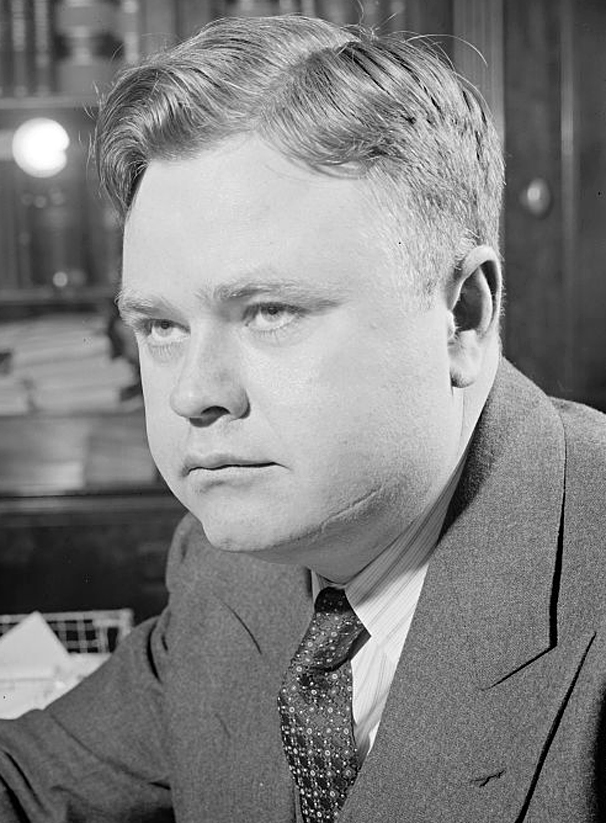

Member of the U.S. House of Representatives from Oklahoma's 4th district
- In office January 3, 1937 – January 3, 1947
- Preceded by: Percy Lee Gassaway
- Succeeded by: Glen D. Johnson

Personal details
- Born: Lyle Hagler Boren; May 11, 1909 Waxahachie, Texas, U.S.
- Died: July 2, 1992 (aged 83) Oklahoma City, Oklahoma, U.S.
- Party: Democratic
- Spouse: Christine McKown
- Children: 2, including David
- Relatives: Mae Boren Axton (sister); James Boren (nephew); Hoyt Axton (nephew); Dan Boren (grandson)
- Education: East Central University (BA); Oklahoma State University, Stillwater

Lyle Hagler Boren (May 11, 1909 – July 2, 1992) was a U.S. Democratic Party politician and a member of the United States House of Representatives from Oklahoma, serving from 1937 to 1947 and was defeated for renomination in the 1946 election. He was known for his independence in the party, opposing labor union strikes on defense plants and attempts to expand the federal government.

Boren attracted national attention for his criticism of The Grapes of Wrath. Calling it “a lie, a black, infernal creation of a twisted, distorted mind" and decrying its author, John Steinbeck. He was active in state politics long after leaving Congress and was the father of former U.S. Senator and Oklahoma Governor David Boren, and grandfather of former U.S. Congressman Dan Boren, who represented Oklahoma's 2nd congressional district from 2005 to 2013.

== Early life and career ==
Boren was born near Waxahachie, Texas, the son of Nannie May (née Weatherall) and Mark Latimer Boren, and moved to Lawton, Oklahoma in 1917, where he attended public schools. He finished high school in Choctaw, Oklahoma graduating from Choctaw High School, where the activities center used to bear his name until it was renamed in 2021. His sister was the "Heartbreak Hotel" songwriter Mae Axton. Boren was graduated from East Central College at Ada, Oklahoma, in 1930. From 1930 to 1935, he was a school teacher in Wolf, Oklahoma, and later served as a deputy procurement officer for the United States Department of the Treasury. Furthermore, he was involved in agricultural and mercantile business interests. He married the former Christine McKown, an Oklahoma State University graduate and public school teacher, in 1936, and had two children, David Boren and Susan Boren Dorman, and two grandchildren including Dan Boren.

== Political career ==
Boren was first elected to the United States Congress in November 1936 as a Democrat, at the age of 26, and was one of the youngest people to ever serve in the House. He was continuously re-elected until 1946 when he lost the Democratic primary election to Glen D. Johnson. Following his tenure in Congress, he resumed his business pursuits, except, in 1948, when he attempted to re-enter politics by running unsuccessfully for his former U.S. House seat.

Boren was known as an independent, opposing his party on several occasions. He worked against the growth of the federal government and excessive federal spending. He angered labor unions by backing legislation to ban strikes at defense plants, which did hurt him politically. Boren's legislative efforts included cancer research, old-age pensions, the Civil Aeronautics Board, newsprint and paper shortages, consumer product labeling, railroad freight rates, and municipal bonds.

In 1938, Boren told his fellow Congressmen, "The greatest problem in America today is to erase the question in the minds of men, 'What is the government going to do for me?' and replace it with the question, 'What can I do for my country".

== Later life and state politics ==
After leaving Congress, Boren resumed many of his former mercantile business and agricultural pursuits. In 1957, he became a lobbyist for the railroad industry. He retired in 1969 and continued ranching in Oklahoma. He was also a spokesman and successful fund-raiser for the Oklahoma Democratic Party and worked tirelessly to help Democratic candidates win election to public office. Most notably, Boren assisted his son, David Boren's campaigns for Governor of Oklahoma in 1974, and U.S. Senate in 1978.

== Retirement and death ==
Boren retired from public life in the mid-1980s due to failing health after approximately 50 years of service, first in Congress and later as an advocate for other candidates. He moved to Oklahoma City, Oklahoma, where he remained until his death on July 2, 1992.

U.S. House of Representatives
Preceded by Percy Lee Gassaway	Member of the U.S. House of Representatives from Oklahoma's 4th congressional district 1937–1947	Succeeded by Glen D. Johnson
