= Samuel J. Montgomery =

American politician

Samuel James Montgomery
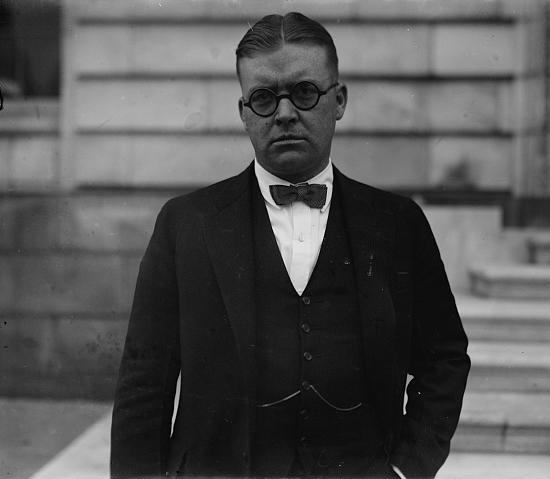

Member of the U.S. House of Representatives from Oklahoma's 1st district
- In office March 4, 1925 – March 3, 1927
- Preceded by: Everette B. Howard
- Succeeded by: Everette B. Howard

Personal details
- Born: December 1, 1896 Buffalo, Kentucky
- Died: June 4, 1957 (aged 60) Oklahoma City, Oklahoma
- Party: Republican
- Spouse: Elizabeth Grove Hutcheson Montgomery
- Children: Henry Montgomery; Elizabeth Montgomery
- Education: University of Oklahoma at Norman
- Profession: Attorney

Military service
- Allegiance: United States of America (United States of America)
- Branch/service: United States Marine Corps
- Years of service: 1917–1919
- Rank: Private
- Unit: Second Division, American Expeditionary Forces
- Battles/wars: World War I
- Awards: Croix de Guerre (France)

Samuel James Montgomery (December 1, 1896 – June 4, 1957) was an American politician and a U.S. Representative from Oklahoma.

== Biography ==
Born in Buffalo, Kentucky, Montgomery was the son of Henry Harrison and Ella Slack (Montgomery) Montgomery. He moved to Oklahoma in 1902 with his parents, who settled in Bartlesville. He attended the public schools, studied law at the University of Oklahoma at Norman, and was admitted to the bar in 1919. He married Elizabeth Grove Hutcheson at Fort Worth, Texas, and they had two children, Henry and Elizabeth.

== Career ==
Montgomery practiced law in Bartlesville, Oklahoma until he enlisted as a private in the Sixth Regiment, United States Marine Corps, on July 18, 1917, and served in the Second Division, American Expeditionary Forces, until May 19, 1919, when he was honorably discharged. He received the Croix de Guerre from the Republic of France.

Elected as a Republican to the Sixty-ninth Congress, Montgomery served from March 4, 1925, to March 3, 1927. He was an unsuccessful candidate for reelection in 1926 to the Seventieth Congress, and practiced law in Tulsa and later in Oklahoma City.

== Death ==
Montgomery died in Oklahoma City, Oklahoma, on June 4, 1957 (age 60 years, 185 days). He is interred in Memorial Park Cemetery, Bartlesville, Oklahoma.

U.S. House of Representatives
Preceded by Everette B. Howard	Member of the U.S. House of Representatives from Oklahoma's 1st congressional district 1925–1927	Succeeded by Everette B. Howard
