= Arthur, Missouri =

Unincorporated community in Missouri, U.S.

Coordinates: 38°00′47″N 94°22′10″W

Arthur is an unincorporated community in Vernon County, in the U.S. state of Missouri.

== History ==
Arthur was platted in 1881 when the Missouri Pacific Railroad was extended to that point. A post office called Arthur was established in 1881, and remained in operation until 1936. The community has the name of Arthur Talmadge, the son of a railroad official.

In 1925, Arthur had 23 inhabitants.
