= Thomas A. Chandler =

American politician

Thomas Alberter Chandler
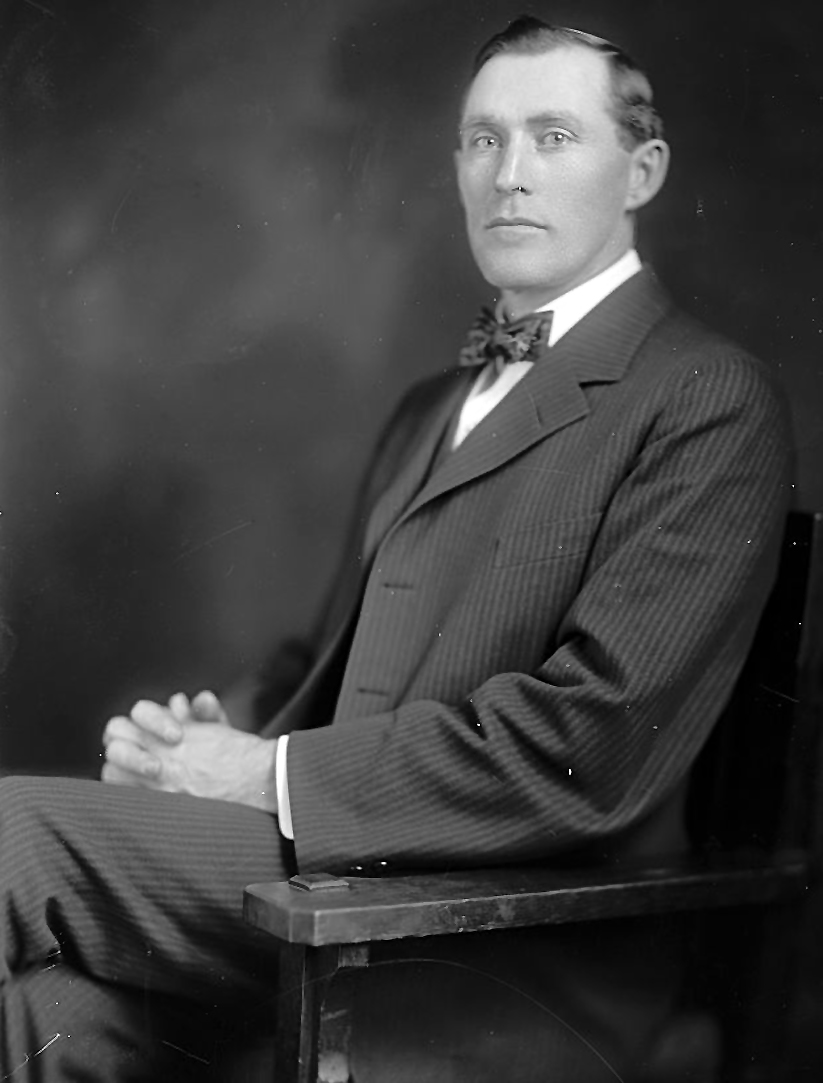

Member of the U.S. House of Representatives from Oklahoma's 1st district
- In office March 4, 1917 – March 3, 1919
- Preceded by: James S. Davenport
- Succeeded by: Everette B. Howard
- In office March 4, 1921 – March 3, 1923
- Preceded by: Everette B. Howard
- Succeeded by: Everette B. Howard

Personal details
- Born: July 26, 1871 Eucha, Indian Territory (now Oklahoma), United States
- Died: June 22, 1953 (aged 81) Vinita, Oklahoma
- Party: Republican
- Spouse: Marie L. Wainwright Chandler
- Children: Norma Louise Chandler; Collis P. Chandler
- Education: Drury College
- Profession: Attorney; politician; oilman; farmer

Thomas Alberter Chandler (July 26, 1871 – June 22, 1953) was an American politician and a U.S. Representative from Oklahoma.

== Biography ==
Born near Eucha, Delaware County, Indian Territory (now Oklahoma), Chandler was the son of Burges G. and Annie Gunter Chandler. He attended the public schools, Worcester Academy, Vinita, Indian Territory, in 1888, and, later, Drury College, Springfield, Missouri. In 1894 he married Marie L. Wainwright, and they had two children, Norma Louise and Collis.

== Career ==
Chandler was appointed a Cherokee revenue collector in 1891. Served as a Cherokee town-site Commissioner from 1895 to 1898 and United States deputy clerk of the court for the northern district of Indian Territory from 1900 to 1907.

He studied law and was admitted to the bar in 1907 and commenced practice in Vinita, Indian Territory. He served as delegate to the Republican National Convention in 1908. He was member of the first Board of Public Affairs for the State of Oklahoma in 1909 and 1910. He resumed the practice of law, and also engaged in the production of oil, in agricultural pursuits, and in the real estate business.

Elected as a Republican to the 65th Congress, Chandler served from March 4, 1917, to March 3, 1919. He was an unsuccessful candidate for reelection in 1918 to the 66th Congress, but was elected to the 67th Congress, and served from March 4, 1921, to March 3, 1923. Again an unsuccessful candidate for reelection in 1922 to the 68th Congress, he resumed the practice of law.

In 1927, he was convicted of fraud in federal court with six co-defendants.

== Death ==
Chandler died in Vinita, Craig County, Oklahoma, on June 22, 1953 (age 81 years, 331 days). He is interred at Fairview Cemetery in Vinita.

U.S. House of Representatives
Preceded by James S. Davenport	Member of the U.S. House of Representatives from Oklahoma's 1st congressional district 1917–1919	Succeeded by Everette B. Howard
Preceded by Everette B. Howard	Member of the U.S. House of Representatives from Oklahoma's 1st congressional district 1921–1923	Succeeded by Everette B. Howard
