= Charles O'Connor (politician) =

American lawyer and politician (1878-1940)

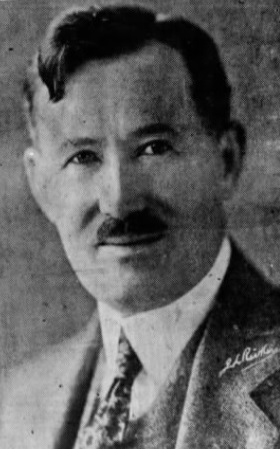
- The Craig County Gazette (Vinita, Oklahoma), August 2, 1928

Member of the U.S. House of Representatives from Oklahoma's 1st district
- In office March 4, 1929 – March 3, 1931
- Preceded by: Everette B. Howard
- Succeeded by: Wesley E. Disney

Personal details
- Born: October 26, 1878 Knox County, Missouri, U.S.
- Died: November 15, 1940 (aged 62) Denver, Colorado, U.S.
- Party: Republican
- Spouse: Elizabeth Buell O'Connor
- Education: Colorado State Teachers' College; University of Colorado
- Profession: Lawyer

Charles O'Connor (October 26, 1878 – November 15, 1940) was an American lawyer and politician who served as the U.S. representative for Oklahoma's 1st congressional district from 1929 to 1931. He was a member of the Republican Party.

== Biography ==
O'Connor was born on a farm near Edina, Knox County, Missouri son of Charles and Catherine (née McCarthy) O'Connor, and attended the rural schools. He graduated from the State Teachers' College, Greeley, Colorado, in 1901 and from the law department of the University of Colorado at Boulder in 1904. Admitted to the bar the same year, he commenced practice in Boulder, Colorado. In 1905 he married Elizabeth Buell. They had three sons, one of whom died at a young age.

== Career ==
From 1911 to 1913, O'Connor was the first Assistant Attorney General of Colorado. He became city attorney of Boulder from 1917 through 1918; and then moved to Tulsa, Oklahoma, in 1919. There he continued the practice of his profession.

Elected as a Republican member of the United States House of Representatives for one term, O'Connor served from March 4, 1929 to March 3, 1931. He was unsuccessful in his re-election attempt, and resumed his law practice in Tulsa, Oklahoma. He moved back to Boulder, Colorado, in 1936 because of his failing health.

== Death ==
O'Connor died of pneumonia in Denver, Colorado, on November 15, 1940, and is interred at Green Mountain Cemetery, Boulder, Colorado.

U.S. House of Representatives
Preceded by Everette B. Howard	Member of the U.S. House of Representatives from Oklahoma's 1st congressional district 1929-1931	Succeeded by Wesley E. Disney
