= Everette B. Howard =

American politician

Everette Burgess Howard
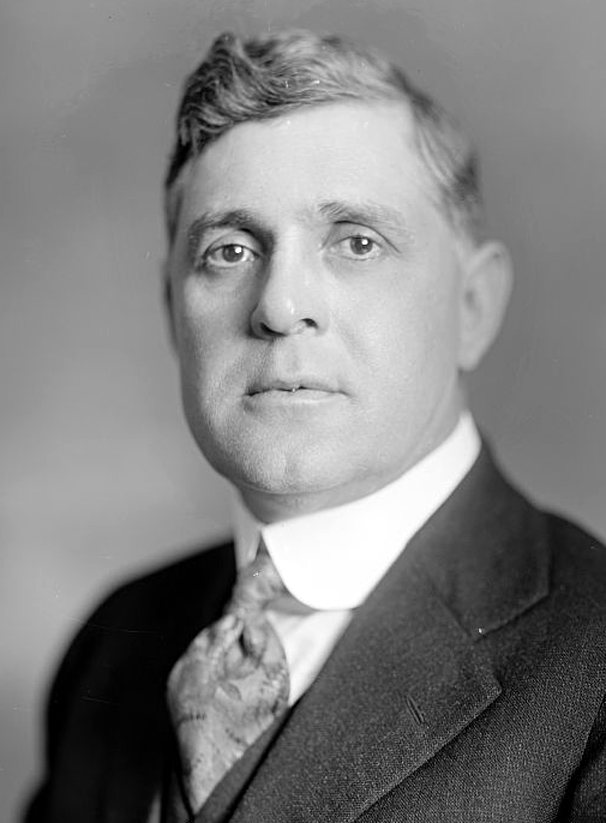

Member of the U.S. House of Representatives from Oklahoma's 1st congressional district district
- In office March 4, 1927 – March 3, 1929
- Preceded by: Samuel J. Montgomery
- Succeeded by: Charles O'Connor
- In office March 4, 1923 – March 3, 1925
- Preceded by: Thomas Alberter Chandler
- Succeeded by: Samuel J. Montgomery
- In office March 4, 1919 – March 3, 1921
- Preceded by: Thomas Alberter Chandler
- Succeeded by: Thomas Alberter Chandler

4th Oklahoma State Auditor
- In office January 1915 – January 1919
- Governor: Robert L. Williams
- Preceded by: Joseph C. McClelland
- Succeeded by: Frank C. Carter

Personal details
- Born: September 19, 1873 Morgantown, Kentucky
- Died: April 3, 1950 (aged 76) Midland, Texas
- Citizenship: United States
- Party: Democratic
- Spouse: Hollis Hope Howard
- Children: Paxton Howard
- Profession: newspaper printer brick manufacturer oil producer politician

Everette Burgess Howard (September 19, 1873 – April 3, 1950) was an American politician and a U.S. Representative from Oklahoma.

== Biography ==
Born in Morgantown, Kentucky, Howard was the son of Addison A. and Addie P. Harreld Howard. He attended the public schools, and learned the art of printing and engaged in newspaper work in Kentucky, Oklahoma, and Missouri. He married Hollis Hope in Missouri on December 4, 1895, and they had one son, Paxton.

== Career ==
Howard moved to Tulsa, Oklahoma, in 1905 and engaged in the manufacture of brick and in the production of oil and gas. He served as a member of the State board of public affairs from 1911 to 1915, and as State auditor of Oklahoma from 1915 to 1919.

Elected as a Democrat to the Sixty-sixth Congress, as a Representative from Oklahoma, serving from March 4, 1919, to March 3, 1921. An unsuccessful candidate for reelection in 1920 to the Sixty-seventh Congress, he was elected to the Sixty-eighth Congress. and served from March 4, 1923, to March 3, 1925. Not a candidate for renomination in 1924, he was an unsuccessful candidate for the Democratic nomination for United States Senator. He was then elected to the Seventieth Congress as Representative and served from March 4, 1927, to March 3, 1929. He was an unsuccessful candidate for reelection in 1928 to the Seventy-first Congress.

Returning to his private business, Howard engaged in the production of oil and gas in Oklahoma and Texas.

== Death ==
Howard died in Midland, Texas, on April 3, 1950. He is interred at Memorial Park, Oklahoma City, Oklahoma.

U.S. House of Representatives
Preceded by Thomas A. Chandler	Member of the U.S. House of Representatives from Oklahoma's 1st congressional district 1919-1921	Succeeded by Thomas A. Chandler
Preceded by Thomas A. Chandler	Member of the U.S. House of Representatives from Oklahoma's 1st congressional district 1923-1925	Succeeded by Samuel J. Montgomery
Preceded by Samuel J. Montgomery	Member of the U.S. House of Representatives from Oklahoma's 1st congressional district 1927-1929	Succeeded by Charles O'Connor
