= Oklahoma Territory's at-large congressional district =

Coordinates: 35°N 97°W

- Obsolete district
- Created: 1890, as a non-voting delegate was granted by Congress
- Eliminated: 1907, as a result of statehood
- Years active: 1890–1907

The Oklahoma Territory's at-large congressional district is a defunct congressional district that was created by the Organic Act of 1890 and ended with Oklahoma statehood. One delegate was to be sent to the U.S. House of Representatives from Oklahoma Territory.

Four men represented Oklahoma Territory as non-voting Delegates in the United States House of Representatives:

== List of delegates representing the territory ==
Delegate	Party	Years	Congress	Electoral history
David Archibald Harvey (Oklahoma City)	Republican	November 4, 1890 – March 3, 1893	51st 52nd	Elected in 1890 to finish the term. Also elected the same day to the next term. Lost re-election.
Dennis Thomas Flynn (Guthrie)	Republican	March 4, 1893 – March 3, 1897	53rd 54th	Elected in 1892. Re-elected in 1894. Lost re-election.
James Yancy Callahan (Kingfisher)	Free Silver	March 4, 1897 – March 3, 1899	55th	Elected in 1896. Retired.
Dennis Thomas Flynn (Guthrie)	Republican	March 4, 1899 – March 3, 1903	56th 57th	Elected in 1898. Re-elected in 1900. Declined renomination.
Bird Segle McGuire (Pawnee)	Republican	March 4, 1903 – March 3, 1907	58th 59th	Elected in 1902. Re-elected in 1904. Position eliminated upon statehood and redistricted to the 1st.
