= Bessie, Oklahoma =

- Town
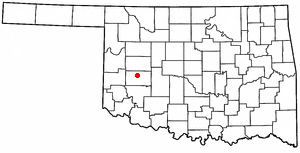
- Location of Bessie, Oklahoma
- Coordinates: 35°23′08″N 98°59′21″W
- Country: United States
- State: Oklahoma
- County: Washita

Area
  - Total: 0.52 sq mi (1.34 km^{2})
  - Land: 0.52 sq mi (1.34 km^{2})
  - Water: 0 sq mi (0.00 km^{2})
- Elevation: 1,542 ft (470 m)

Population (2020)
  - Total: 182
  - Density: 351/sq mi (135.7/km^{2})
- Time zone: UTC-6 (Central (CST))
  - Summer (DST): UTC-5 (CDT)
- ZIP code: 73622
- Area code: 580
- FIPS code: 40-05650
- GNIS feature ID: 2411682

Bessie is a town in Washita County, Oklahoma, United States. As of the 2020 census, Bessie had a population of 182.

== History ==
A post office called Bessie has been in operation since 1903. Some say Bessie was the name of the wife of a railroad official, while others believe the town derives its name from the Blackwell, Enid and Southwestern Railway (BES Line).

== Geography ==
According to the United States Census Bureau, the town has a total area of 0.5 square miles (1.3 km^{2}), all land.

=== Climate ===
Climate data for Bessie, Oklahoma
Month	Jan	Feb	Mar	Apr	May	Jun	Jul	Aug	Sep	Oct	Nov	Dec	Year
Mean daily maximum °F (°C)	48.9 (9.4)	54.1 (12.3)	64 (18)	74.1 (23.4)	81.9 (27.7)	90.9 (32.7)	96.3 (35.7)	94.6 (34.8)	85.9 (29.9)	75.1 (23.9)	60.8 (16.0)	50.6 (10.3)	73.1 (22.8)
Mean daily minimum °F (°C)	24.2 (−4.3)	28.7 (−1.8)	37.2 (2.9)	47.2 (8.4)	56.3 (13.5)	64.9 (18.3)	70.1 (21.2)	68.4 (20.2)	60.9 (16.1)	49.5 (9.7)	37.5 (3.1)	27.5 (−2.5)	47.7 (8.7)
Average precipitation inches (mm)	0.9 (23)	1.2 (30)	2 (51)	2 (51)	4.7 (120)	3.9 (99)	1.9 (48)	3.1 (79)	3.6 (91)	2.5 (64)	1.8 (46)	0.9 (23)	28.4 (720)
Source: Weatherbase.com

== Demographics ==
Historical population
Census	Pop.	Note	%±
1920	363		—
1930	415		14.3%
1940	284		−31.6%
1950	205		−27.8%
1960	226		10.2%
1970	210		−7.1%
1980	245		16.7%
1990	242		−1.2%
2000	190		−21.5%
2010	181		−4.7%
2020	182		0.6%
U.S. Decennial Census

=== 2020 census ===
As of the 2020 census, Bessie had a population of 182. The median age was 39.8 years. 21.4% of residents were under the age of 18 and 18.1% of residents were 65 years of age or older. For every 100 females there were 111.6 males, and for every 100 females age 18 and over there were 120.0 males age 18 and over.

0.0% of residents lived in urban areas, while 100.0% lived in rural areas.

There were 78 households in Bessie, of which 37.2% had children under the age of 18 living in them. Of all households, 44.9% were married-couple households, 26.9% were households with a male householder and no spouse or partner present, and 17.9% were households with a female householder and no spouse or partner present. About 32.1% of all households were made up of individuals and 14.1% had someone living alone who was 65 years of age or older.

There were 87 housing units, of which 10.3% were vacant. The homeowner vacancy rate was 3.2% and the rental vacancy rate was 5.3%.

Racial composition as of the 2020 census
Race	Number	Percent
White	155	85.2%
Black or African American	2	1.1%
American Indian and Alaska Native	9	4.9%
Asian	0	0.0%
Native Hawaiian and Other Pacific Islander	0	0.0%
Some other race	2	1.1%
Two or more races	14	7.7%
Hispanic or Latino (of any race)	14	7.7%

=== 2000 census ===
As of the census of 2000, there were 190 people, 87 households, and 56 families residing in the town. The population density was 370.6 inhabitants per square mile (143.1/km^{2}). There were 95 housing units at an average density of 185.3 per square mile (71.5/km^{2}). The racial makeup of the town was 96.32% White, 2.11% Native American, 0.53% Asian, and 1.05% from two or more races. Hispanic or Latino of any race were 1.58% of the population.

There were 87 households, out of which 31.0% had children under the age of 18 living with them, 51.7% were married couples living together, 6.9% had a female householder with no husband present, and 35.6% were non-families. 32.2% of all households were made up of individuals, and 16.1% had someone living alone who was 65 years of age or older. The average household size was 2.18 and the average family size was 2.73.

In the town, the population was spread out, with 22.6% under the age of 18, 7.4% from 18 to 24, 27.9% from 25 to 44, 23.2% from 45 to 64, and 18.9% who were 65 years of age or older. The median age was 41 years. For every 100 females, there were 128.9 males. For every 100 females age 18 and over, there were 107.0 males.

The median income for a household in the town was $26,111, and the median income for a family was $26,806. Males had a median income of $25,938 versus $19,000 for females. The per capita income for the town was $15,110. About 5.5% of families and 10.1% of the population were below the poverty line, including 5.4% of those under the age of eighteen and none of those 65 or over.
