= David Archibald Harvey =

American politician (1845–1916)

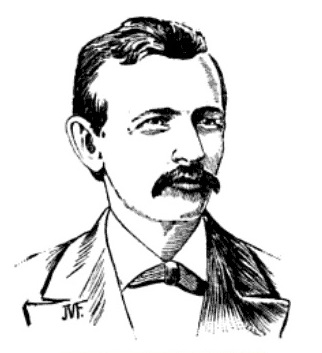

Delegate to the U.S. House of Representatives from the Territory of Oklahoma's at-large district
- In office November 4, 1890 – March 3, 1893
- Succeeded by: Dennis Thomas Flynn

Personal details
- Born: March 20, 1845 Stewiacke, Nova Scotia
- Died: May 24, 1916 (aged 71) Hope, New Mexico, U.S.
- Citizenship: United States
- Party: Republican
- Spouse: Mary Crapsey (m. 1881)
- Education: Miami University
- Profession: Attorney; politician

Military service
- Allegiance: United States
- Branch/service: U.S. Army (Union Army)
- Rank: Sergeant
- Unit: Company B, 4th Ohio Cavalry Regiment
- Battles/wars: American Civil War

David Archibald Harvey (March 20, 1845 – May 24, 1916) was the first delegate to the U.S. House of Representatives from the Oklahoma Territory's at-large district.

== Early life ==
Harvey was born in Stewiacke, Nova Scotia, on March 20, 1845. He moved with his parents to Clermont County, Ohio, in 1852, and attended public schools in Point Isabel in Washington Township.

== Career ==
When the American Civil War began in 1861, Harvey joined the Union army and enlisted in Company B of the 4th Ohio Cavalry Regiment in September 1861. Harvey served throughout the Civil War. He was enlisted as a private and rose to the rank of sergeant.

Following the end of the war, Harvey attended Miami University in Oxford, Ohio, where he studied law. He was admitted to the Ohio bar in 1868 and commenced practice in Topeka, Kansas, in 1869. He served as city attorney in Topeka from 1871 to 1881, and as probate judge from 1881 to 1889.

With the opening of the Oklahoma Territory in 1889, Harvey moved to Wyandotte. He was elected as a delegate to the U.S. House of Representatives from the Oklahoma Territory's at-large district and served in the 51st and 52nd Congresses from November 4, 1890, to March 3, 1893. Harvey introduced the "Harvey Bill" in 1892 that called for Oklahoma statehood. The bill was blocked by the House Committee on Territories. He was unsuccessful in his candidacy for reelection in 1892 to the 53rd Congress.

After leaving Congress, he resumed practicing law, and represented the Indian tribes of northeast Oklahoma and the Cayugas in New York. He resided in Miami, Oklahoma, and later lived on a farm that was part of the Wyandotte Nation in Oklahoma, near Seneca, Missouri on the Oklahoma-Missouri border, which had been given to him in consideration for representing their interests.

== Death ==
Harvey traveled to Hope, New Mexico, in 1916 in an effort to restore his health. He died there on May 24, 1916 (age 71 years, 65 days). He is interred at Seneca Cemetery in Seneca, Missouri.

== Family ==
Harvey married Mary Crapsey of Cincinnati, Ohio, in 1881.

U.S. House of Representatives
Preceded by none	Delegate to the U.S. House of Representatives from the Oklahoma Territory; November 4, 1890 – March 3, 1893	Succeeded by Dennis Thomas Flynn
