= James V. McClintic =

American politician

James Vernon McClintic
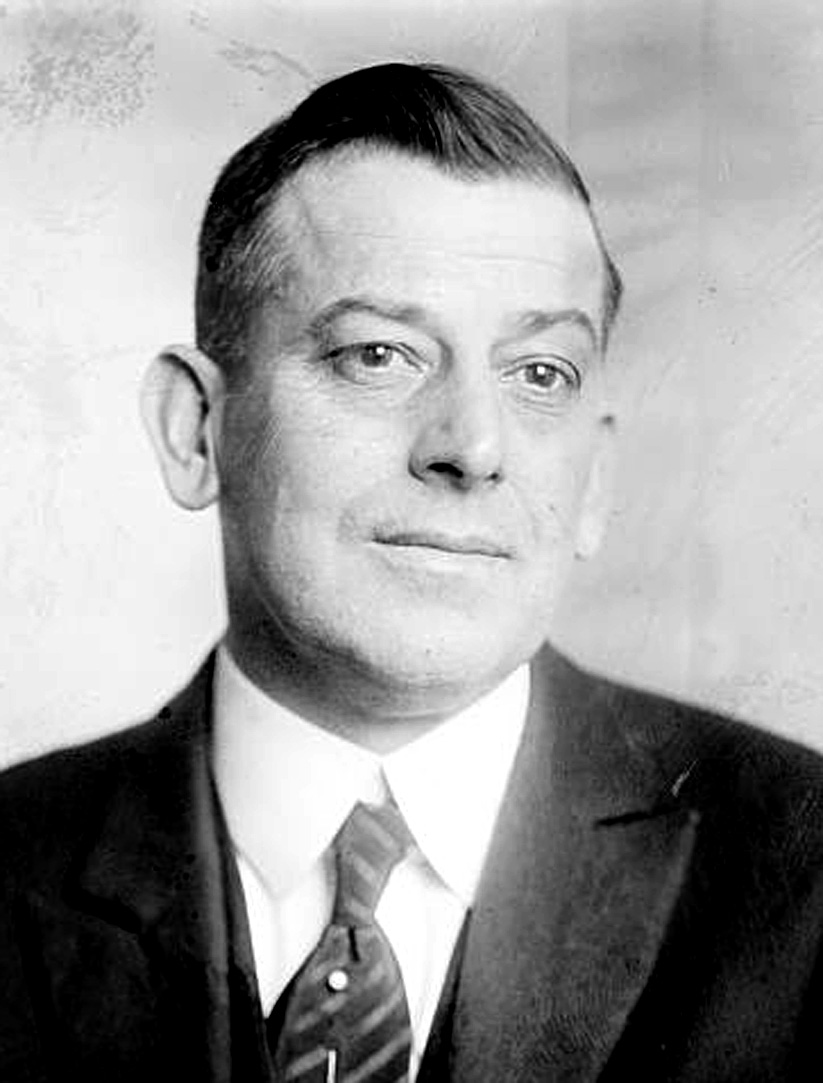

Member of the U.S. House of Representatives from Oklahoma's 7th district
- In office March 4, 1915 – January 3, 1935
- Preceded by: District created
- Succeeded by: Sam C. Massingale

Member of the Oklahoma Senate
- In office 1913-1914

Member of the Oklahoma House of Representatives
- In office 1911

Personal details
- Born: September 8, 1878 Bremond, Texas, US
- Died: April 22, 1948 (aged 69) Chicago, Illinois, US
- Party: Democratic
- Spouse: Emma May Biggs McClintic
- Children: 2
- Education: AddRan University (now Texas Christian University); Georgetown University
- Profession: merchant; farmer; politician; Attorney

James Vernon McClintic (September 8, 1878 – April 22, 1948) was an American politician and a U.S. Representative from Oklahoma.

== Biography ==
Born near Bremond, Texas, McClintic was the son of George Vance and Emma Clay Proctor Mc Clintic. He moved with his parents to Groesbeck, Texas, in 1880 and attended the public schools and Add Ran University (now Texas Christian University) in Fort Worth. He married Emma May Biggs in 1904 and they had two children, Mary Vance and Olive Erle.

== Career ==
McClintic accepted a position with a wholesale dry-goods company in St. Louis, Missouri in 1901. In 1902, he became a traveling salesman. He moved to Snyder, Oklahoma Territory, in 1902, where he opened the Texas Store, a mercantile business. He then homesteaded a farm in Texas County in 1906.

After returning to Snyder, McClintic was elected city clerk in 1908. One year later, he served as clerk of Kiowa County, Oklahoma in 1909. When the southern portion of Kiowa County broke away to form Swanson County, with Snyder as its county seat, he was elected to the Oklahoma House of Representatives. He served as Swanson County's representative from January 3, 1911, until the dissolution of the county on June 27 of that year. He served in the Oklahoma Senate in 1913 and 1914.

Having studied law at Georgetown University, Washington, D.C., McClintic was admitted to the bar in 1928 and licensed to practice in all the courts of Oklahoma.

McClintic was elected as a Democrat to the 64th Congress and to the nine succeeding Congresses and served from March 4, 1915, to January 3, 1935. During the 65th Congress, he was chairman of the Committee on Expenditures on Public Buildings. He failed to receive his party's nomination in 1934.

From 1935 to 1940, McClintic was the executive assistant to the Governor of Oklahoma. He then served as an administrative assistant in the District of Columbia Department of Vehicles and Traffic in 1940 and 1941.

McClintic once again attempted to secure a Democratic Party nomination to fill a vacancy in the 67th Congress, but was again unsuccessful. However, he returned to Washington as special assistant to the Secretary of the Interior, serving from 1941 to 1944. As a member of the Readjustment Division of the War Department he served in 1944 and 1945. He then resumed the practice of law.

== Death ==
On a train en route to Los Angeles, McClintic died from a heart attack near Chicago, Cook County, Illinois, on April 22, 1948. He is interred at Rose Hill Burial Park, Oklahoma City, Oklahoma.

U.S. House of Representatives
Preceded by District created	Member of the U.S. House of Representatives from Oklahoma's 7th congressional district 1915-1935	Succeeded by Sam C. Massingale
