= Wesley E. Disney =

American politician (1883–1961)

Wesley Ernest Disney
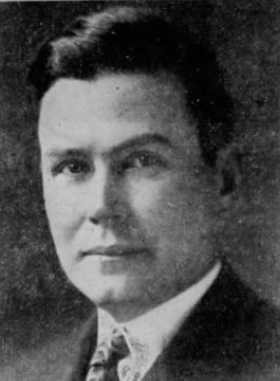
- Harlow's Weekly, May 28, 1938

Member of the U.S. House of Representatives from Oklahoma's 1st district
- In office March 4, 1931 – January 3, 1945
- Preceded by: Charles O'Connor
- Succeeded by: George Schwabe

Member of the Oklahoma House of Representatives
- In office 1919-1924

Personal details
- Born: October 31, 1883 Richland, Kansas, U.S.
- Died: March 26, 1961 (aged 77) Washington, D.C., U.S.
- Party: Democratic Party
- Spouse: Anna Susanna Vansant Disney
- Children: Wesley Vansant Disney; Ralph Willard Disney
- Education: University of Kansas at Lawrence
- Profession: Lawyer, politician, lobbyist

Wesley Ernest Disney (October 31, 1883 – March 26, 1961) was an American politician and a U.S. Representative from Oklahoma. He was also a member of the Oklahoma House of Representatives.

== Biography ==
Born in Richland, Kansas, Disney was the son of Wesley and Elizabeth Matney Disney, and attended the public schools of Kansas. He was graduated from the law department of the University of Kansas at Lawrence in 1906. He was admitted to the Kansas bar in 1906, the Oklahoma bar in 1908, and began practice in Muskogee, Oklahoma, in 1908. On September 22, 1910, he married Anna Van Sant, and they had two sons.

== Career ==
Disney was county attorney of Muskogee County, Oklahoma, from 1911 to 1915. He served as member of the Oklahoma House of Representatives from 1919 to 1924. He was chairman of the board of managers in the impeachment trial of Governor Jack C. Walton in 1923.

Elected as a Democrat to the Seventy-second and to the six succeeding Congresses, Disney served from March 4, 1931, to January 3, 1945. He was on the Banking and Currency Committee as well as the Ways and Means Committee, making him known as "watchdog of the Treasury". Not a candidate for renomination in 1944, he was an unsuccessful candidate for the Democratic nomination for United States Senator. He continued to practice law in Washington, D.C., and Tulsa, Oklahoma, and was also a successful lobbyist.

His brother, Richard L. Disney, was appointed as a judge of the United States Tax Court by Franklin D. Roosevelt.

== Death ==
Disney died in Washington, D.C., on March 26, 1961 (age 77 years, 146 days). He is interred at Memorial Park Cemetery, Tulsa, Oklahoma.

U.S. House of Representatives
Preceded by Charles O'Connor	Member of the U.S. House of Representatives from Oklahoma's 1st congressional district 1931-1945	Succeeded by George Schwabe
