= Dennis Thomas Flynn =

American lawyer

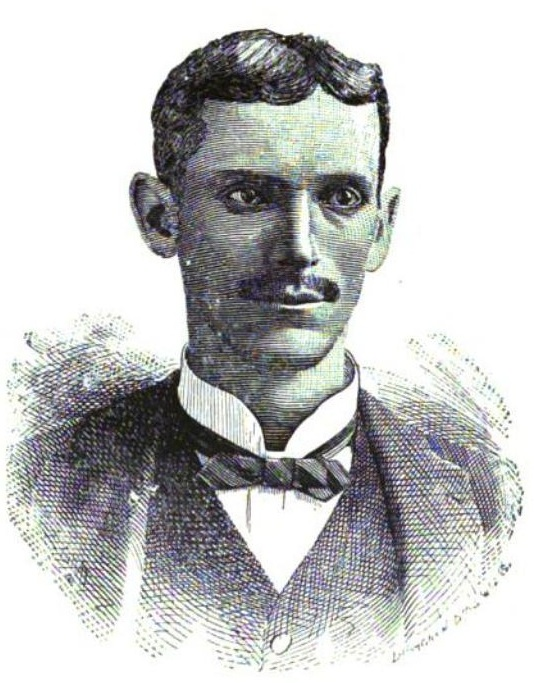

Delegate to the U.S. House of Representatives from Territory of Oklahoma's At-large district
- In office March 4, 1893 – March 3, 1897
- Preceded by: David A. Harvey
- Succeeded by: James Y. Callahan
- In office March 4, 1899 – March 3, 1903
- Preceded by: James Y. Callahan
- Succeeded by: Bird S. McGuire

Personal details
- Born: February 13, 1861 Phoenixville, Pennsylvania, U.S.
- Died: June 19, 1939 (aged 78) Oklahoma City, Oklahoma, U.S.
- Citizenship: United States
- Party: Republican
- Spouse: Addie M. Blanton Flynn
- Children: 4, including Olney F. Flynn
- Education: Canisius College
- Profession: publisher/editor; postmaster; Attorney; politician

Dennis Thomas Flynn (February 13, 1861 – June 19, 1939) was an American politician and a Delegate from Oklahoma Territory to the United States House of Representatives.

== Biography ==
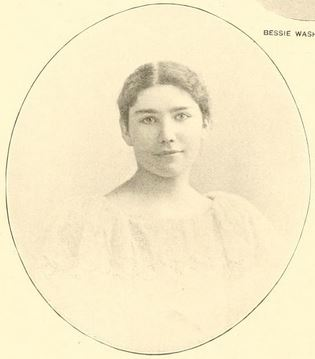
Dorothy Flynn

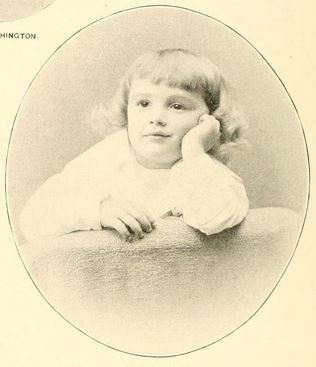
Streeter Flynn

Flynn was born in Phoenixville, Pennsylvania, on February 13, 1861, son of Dennis T. and Margaret (Clancy) Flynn. He moved with his mother to Buffalo, New York, in 1863. There, he became an orphan at the age of three when his mother died. He was raised in a Catholic orphanage where he remained until 1880. He attended common school and then Canisius College in Buffalo.

He married Addie M. Blanton in 1887. Mrs. Flynn was born, reared and educated in Kansas. She was married to Mr. Flynn in Kiowa, Kansas, while he was a practicing lawyer there. In 1889 Flynn was appointed by President Harrison Postmaster of the City of Gutherie, Oklahoma, and the family moved to that place. Mrs. Flynn is the mother of four children; her oldest son, Dennis, died when quite young; surviving a daughter, Dorothy, a son, Streeter Flynn, and another son.

== Career ==
After college, Flynn moved to Riverside, Iowa, where he established and edited the Riverside Leader and studied law. He was admitted to the Iowa bar association in 1882 and commenced practice in Kiowa, Kansas. There, he was the publisher of the Kiowa Herald and served as first postmaster of Kiowa from December 5, 1884, to July 17, 1885. He would then serve as the Kiowa city attorney from 1886 to 1889.

Flynn then moved to Oklahoma Territory where he served as the postmaster of Guthrie from April 4, 1889, to December 20, 1892. A Republican, he was an unsuccessful candidate for election as the Territorial Delegate to the United States House of Representatives in 1890. He ran again and was elected as the Territorial Delegate to the Fifty-third Congress and began his term on March 4, 1893 and was reelected in 1894. Flynn was an unsuccessful candidate for reelection in 1896.

Flynn ran for office again in 1898 and was elected to the Fifty-sixth Congress. His term began on March 4, 1899 and he was reelected on 1900. Nominated but declining to be a candidate for reelection in 1902, he left office when his term ended on March 3, 1903. He resumed private practice in Oklahoma City in 1904. He was an unsuccessful Republican candidate for election to the United States Senate in 1908, losing to the Democratic candidate, Thomas P. Gore. He was considered for the position of Secretary of the Interior under President William Howard Taft. He served as a delegate to the Republican National Convention in 1912, his last participation in politics.

Dennis T. Flynn was Oklahoma's first Republican National Committeeman and served as Guthrie, Oklahoma’s first postmaster soon after he arrived in the Land Run of 1889.

Flynn's great-grandson is William Flynn Martin.

== Death ==
Flynn died in Oklahoma City, Oklahoma, on June 19, 1939 (age 78 years, 126 days). He is interred at Fairlawn Cemetery in Oklahoma City.

U.S. House of Representatives
Preceded by David Archibald Harvey	Delegate to the U.S. House of Representatives from Oklahoma Territory; March 4, 1893 – March 3, 1897	Succeeded by James Yancy Callahan
Preceded by James Yancy Callahan	Delegate to the U.S. House of Representatives from Oklahoma Territory; March 4, 1899 – March 3, 1903	Succeeded by Bird Segle McGuire
