= Dixie Gilmer =

American politician

William Franklin (Dixie) Gilmer
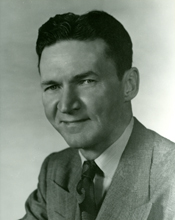

Member of the U.S. House of Representatives from Oklahoma's 1st district
- In office January 3, 1949 – January 3, 1951
- Preceded by: George Schwabe
- Succeeded by: George Schwabe

Member of the Oklahoma House of Representatives
- In office 1927

Personal details
- Born: June 7, 1901 Mount Airy, North Carolina, U.S.
- Died: June 9, 1954 (aged 53) Oklahoma City, Oklahoma, U.S.
- Citizenship: United States
- Party: Democratic
- Spouse: Ellen McClure Gilmer
- Education: University of Oklahoma College of Law
- Profession: Attorney; politician

William Franklin "Dixie" Gilmer (June 7, 1901 – June 9, 1954) was an American politician and a U.S. Representative from Oklahoma.

== Biography ==
Born in Mount Airy, North Carolina, Gilmer was the son of W. F. and Emma Prather Gilmer. He moved with his parents to Oklahoma, and attended the public schools of Oklahoma City, Oklahoma. He served as a page in the House of Representatives from 1911 to 1919, and graduated from the law school of the University of Oklahoma in Norman in 1923. Admitted to the bar in 1923, he commenced the practice of law in Wetumka, Oklahoma, and also served as a police judge and mayor.

== Career ==
Gilmer served as member of the State house of representatives in 1927. In 1928, he married Ellen McClure of Celeste, Texas, and they had no children. He moved to Tulsa, Oklahoma, in 1929, and served as assistant county attorney of Tulsa County, Oklahoma from 1931 to 1933, as well as County attorney of Tulsa County 1936-1946. He was an unsuccessful candidate for the Democratic nomination for governor in 1946.

Elected as a Democrat to the Eighty-first Congress, Gilmer served from January 3, 1949 to January 3, 1951. He was an unsuccessful candidate for reelection in 1950 to the Eighty-second Congress, and the governor appointed him state safety commissioner. He served in that capacity until his death.

== Death ==
Gilmer died in Oklahoma City, Oklahoma, on June 9, 1954 (age 53 years, 2 days). He is interred at Memorial Park Cemetery in Oklahoma City.

U.S. House of Representatives
Preceded by George Schwabe	Member of the U.S. House of Representatives from Oklahoma's 1st congressional district 1949-1951	Succeeded by George Schwabe
