= Victor Wickersham =

American politician

Victor Eugene Wickersham
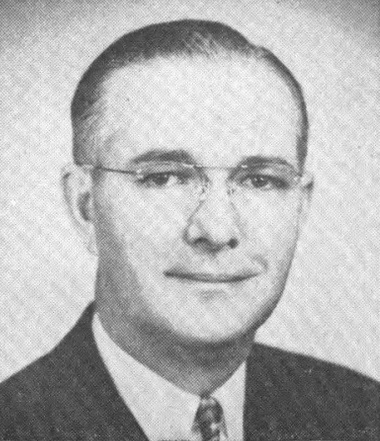

Member of the U.S. House of Representatives from Oklahoma
- In office January 3, 1961 – January 3, 1965
- Preceded by: Toby Morris
- Succeeded by: Jed Johnson, Jr.
- Constituency: 6th district
- In office January 3, 1949 – January 3, 1957
- Preceded by: Preston E. Peden
- Succeeded by: Toby Morris
- Constituency: 7th district (1949–1953); 6th district (1953–1957)
- In office April 1, 1941 – January 3, 1947
- Preceded by: Sam C. Massingale
- Succeeded by: Preston E. Peden
- Constituency: 7th district

Member of the Oklahoma House of Representatives
- In office January 3, 1971 – January 3, 1979
- In office February 9, 1988 – March 15, 1988

Personal details
- Born: February 9, 1906 Lone Rock, Arkansas, U.S.
- Died: March 15, 1988 (aged 82) Oklahoma City, Oklahoma, U.S.
- Party: Democratic
- Spouses: Jessie Blaine Stiles Wickersham; Lorene Dennis Wickersham
- Children: 4
- Profession: court clerk, building contractor, real estate agent, insurance agent, investment broker, politician

Victor Eugene Wickersham (February 9, 1906 – March 15, 1988) was an American politician and a U.S. Representative from Oklahoma.

== Early life and education ==
Born on a farm near Lone Rock, Arkansas, Wickersham was the son of Frank Morrell and Lillie Mae Sword Wickersham. He moved to Mangum, Oklahoma, with his parents in 1915 and was educated in the public schools of Oklahoma.

== Career ==
Employed in the office of the county clerk of Greer County, Oklahoma from 1924 to 1926, Wickersham was appointed as court clerk of Greer County from 1926 to 1935. On June 30, 1929, he married Jessie Blaine Stiles of Mangum. As the county clerk, he issued his own marriage license. Four children were born to the marriage, LaMelba, Nelda, Galen, and Victor Wickersham II.

Wickersham served as chief clerk of the board of affairs of the State of Oklahoma in 1935 and 1936. He engaged as a building contractor in Oklahoma City in 1937 and 1938 and in the life insurance business 1938–1941. Wickersham also worked as a real estate, insurance, and investment broker.

== Congressional tenure ==
Wickersham was elected as a Democrat to the 77th Congress to fill the vacancy caused by the death of Sam C. Massingale. He was reelected to the 78th and 79th Congresses and served from April 1, 1941, to January 3, 1947. He was an unsuccessful candidate for renomination in 1946, but was reelected to the 81st and to the three succeeding Congresses (January 3, 1949 – January 3, 1957). He was not renominated in 1956 and 1958. He succeeded in his election to the 87th and to the 88th Congresses (January 3, 1961 – January 3, 1965). He was an unsuccessful candidate for renomination in 1964 to the 89th Congress.

Wickersham did not sign the 1956 Southern Manifesto, and voted for the Twenty-Fourth Amendment (abolishing the poll tax) in 1962, but voted against the Civil Rights Act of 1964.

By the end of his Congressional career, Wickersham had built up a predominantly liberal voting record.

=== State legislature ===
In 1984 Wickersham's wife, Jessie, died. He married Lorene Dennis in 1986. He served as member of the Oklahoma House of Representatives from January 3, 1971, to January 3, 1979, and again from February 9, 1988, until his death. He was the oldest state legislator in office in 1988 at the age of 82.

== Death ==
Wickersham died in Oklahoma City, Oklahoma County, Oklahoma, on March 15, 1988 (age 82 years, 35 days). He is interred at Riverside Cemetery, Mangum, Oklahoma.

U.S. House of Representatives
Preceded by Sam C. Massingale	Member of the U.S. House of Representatives from Oklahoma's 7th congressional district 1941–1947	Succeeded by Preston E. Peden
Preceded by Preston E. Peden	Member of the U.S. House of Representatives from Oklahoma's 7th congressional district 1949–1953	Succeeded by District inactive
Preceded by Toby Morris	Member of the U.S. House of Representatives from Oklahoma's 6th congressional district 1953–1957	Succeeded by Toby Morris
Preceded by Toby Morris	Member of the U.S. House of Representatives from Oklahoma's 6th congressional district 1961–1965	Succeeded by Jed Johnson, Jr.
