= James Yancy Callahan =

American politician

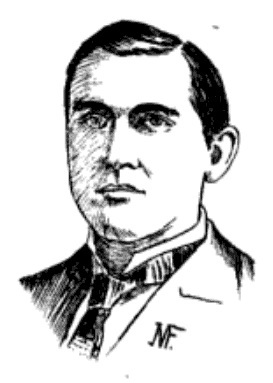

Delegate to the U.S. House of Representatives from Oklahoma Territory's At-large district
- In office March 4, 1897 – March 3, 1899
- Preceded by: Dennis Thomas Flynn
- Succeeded by: Dennis Thomas Flynn

Personal details
- Born: December 19, 1852 Dent County, Missouri
- Died: May 3, 1935 (aged 82) Enid, Oklahoma
- Citizenship: United States
- Party: Free Silver Party
- Spouse: Margaret Asbreen Mitchell Callahan
- Children: Agnes Elmer Callahan; Mary Magadelene Callahan Eiselein; Rufus Omar Callahan; Anna Ida Callahan; Florence Palestine Callahan Burson; Alvin Kenneth Callahan; Lillie Effie Callahan Nazworthy; Orville Palmer Callahan; Lacey Edith Callahan; Eunice Minnie Callahan; Eris Carleton Callahan McCann
- Profession: farmer; minister; politician; publisher

James Yancy Callahan (December 19, 1852 – May 3, 1935) was an American politician, and a Delegate to the United States House of Representatives from 1897 to 1899, representing the Oklahoma Territory He was a member of the Free Silver party, and is the only third party politician to represent Oklahoma at the federal level.

== Biography ==
Callahan was born near Salem, Dent County, Missouri, on December 19, 1852. He was reared on the farm where he was born, educated in the common schools, and worked on a farm. He married Margaret Asbreen Mitchell on February 19, 1872, and they had eleven children, Agnes Elmer, Mary Magadelene, Rufus Omar, Anna Ida, Florence Palestine, Alvin Kenneth, Lillie Effie, Orville Palmer, Lacey Edith, Eunice Minnie, and Eris Carleton.

== Career ==
Entering the ministry in the Methodist Episcopal Church in 1880, Callahan continued to engage in agricultural pursuits, sawmilling, and mining. In 1885 he moved to Stanton County, Kansas, where he lived until 1892. In 1886, a year after he moved to Kansas, he was elected register of deeds for Stanton County. He was reelected in 1888 and served until December 1889, when he resigned and returned to Dent County, Missouri. In 1892 he moved to Kingfisher County, Oklahoma, settling near the town of Kingfisher. He engaged in agricultural pursuits.

In 1896, Callahan was nominated for Congressional delegate from Oklahoma Territory, and was elected by a plurality of less than fifteen hundred, running on the Free Silver ticket to the 55th United States Congress. He served from March 4, 1897 to March 3, 1899, but was not a candidate for re-nomination in 1898.

After leaving politics, Callahan relocated to Enid, Garfield County, Oklahoma, where he published the Jacksonian until January 1, 1913. He retired from active business pursuits in 1913. He claimed to be healed of a chronic ulcer in 1923 after receiving prayer from Rev. P. C. Nelson, an Assemblies of God educator.

== Death ==
Callahan resided in Enid, Oklahoma until his death there on May 3, 1935 (age 82 years, 135 days). He is interred at Enid Cemetery.

U.S. House of Representatives
Preceded by Dennis Thomas Flynn	Delegate to the U.S. House of Representatives from Oklahoma Territory; March 4, 1897–March 3, 1899	Succeeded by Dennis Thomas Flynn
