= Oklahoma's at-large congressional seat =

Former congressional district of the United States House of Representatives

Coordinates: 35°N 97°W

Oklahoma's at-large congressional district
- Obsolete district
- Created: 1910; 1930
- Eliminated: 1915; 1940
- Years active: 1913-1915; 1933-1943

In 1913, Oklahoma was apportioned three additional congressional seats. For just the 63rd United States Congress, those three members represented the state at-large.

Years	Congress	Seat A			Seat B			Seat C		
Years	Congress	Representative	Party	Electoral history	Representative	Party	Electoral history	Representative	Party	Electoral history
March 3, 1913 – March 3, 1915	63rd	William H. Murray	Democratic	Elected in 1912. Redistricted to the 4th district and seat eliminated.	Joseph Bryan Thompson	Democratic	Elected in 1912. Redistricted to the 5th district and seat eliminated.	Claude Weaver	Democratic	Elected in 1912. Redistricted to the 5th district but lost renomination and seat eliminated.

In 1933, Oklahoma was apportioned one additional seat. For the 73rd through the 77th congresses, Will Rogers held the seat at-large. In 1943, the seat was eliminated.

Years	Congress	Representative	Party	Electoral history
March 3, 1933 – January 3, 1943	73rd 74th 75th 76th 77th	Will Rogers	Democratic	Elected in 1932. Re-elected in 1934. Re-elected in 1936. Re-elected in 1938. Re-elected in 1940. Retired and seat eliminated.
