= Oklahoma's 1st congressional district =

U.S. House district for Oklahoma

Coordinates: 36.2°N 95.8°W

- Interactive map of district boundaries since January 3, 2023
- Representative: Kevin Hern; R–Tulsa
- Distribution: 89.63% urban; 10.37% rural
- Population (2025): 837,619
- Median household income: $73,660
- Ethnicity: 57.3% White; 13.8% Hispanic; 10.2% Two or more races; 8.8% Black; 6.1% Native American; 3.4% Asian; 0.5% other
- Cook PVI: R+11

Oklahoma's 1st congressional district is in the northeastern corner of the state. Anchored by Tulsa, it is largely coextensive with the Tulsa metropolitan area. The district contains all of Tulsa County as well as portions of Creek, Rogers and Wagoner counties. Although it has long been reckoned as the Tulsa district, slivers of Tulsa itself are located in the 2nd and 3rd districts.

Principal cities in the district (other than Tulsa) include Broken Arrow, Bixby, Jenks, Owasso, Sand Springs, and Wagoner.

The district is currently represented by Republican Kevin Hern who defeated Democratic nominee Tim Gilpin to replace Jim Bridenstine, who resigned to become NASA Administrator in 2018.

== History ==
The district was the only congressional district represented by a Republican upon statehood. For much of the district's history, it has shifted back and forth between the two political parties. However, it has leaned increasingly Republican since the second half of the 20th century. Since 1945, only one Democrat has served more than one term in the district. It has been in Republican hands without interruption since 1987. Mitt Romney received 66 percent of the vote in this district in 2012.

Oklahoma's longest serving Senator, Jim Inhofe, represented this district from 1987 to 1994. His four successors, Steve Largent, John Sullivan, Jim Bridenstine, and Kevin Hern have all been Republicans.

According to U.S. Census data as of 2010, whites alone make up 67.1% of the population, African Americans 9.0%, Native Americans at 6.6%, Hispanics at 9.8%, Asians at 2.1 and other races at 5.4%.

== Recent election results from statewide races ==
Year	Office	Results
2008	President	McCain 64% - 36%
2012	President	Romney 65% - 35%
2016	President	Trump 61% - 33%
2016	Senate	Lankford 65% - 28%
2018	Governor	Stitt 52% - 45%
2018	Lt. Governor	Pinnell 60% - 37%
2018	Attorney General	Hunter 61% - 39%
2020	President	Trump 59% - 38%
2020	Senate	Inhofe 57% - 38%
2022	Senate (Reg.)	Lankford 59% - 38%
2022	Senate (Spec.)	Mullin 57% - 41%
2022	Governor	Stitt 52% - 46%
2022	Lt. Governor	Pinnell 61% - 35%
2022	Treasurer	Russ 60% - 35%
2024	President	Trump 60% - 38%

== Composition ==
For the 118th and successive Congresses (based on redistricting following the 2020 census), the district contains all or portions of the following counties and communities:

Creek County (4)

Kellyville, Kiefer, Mounds, Sapulpa (part; also 3rd shared with Tulsa County)

Rogers County (4)

Catoosa (shared with Wagoner County), Fair Oaks (part; also 2nd; shared with Wagoner County), Limestone (part; also 2nd), Owasso (shared with Tulsa County)

Tulsa County (15)

All 15 communities

Wagoner County (9)

Broken Arrow (shared with Tulsa County), Catoosa (shared with Rogers County), Clarksville, Coweta, Fair Oaks (part; also 2nd; shared with Rogers County), Porter, Redbird, Tullahassee, Tulsa (part; also 2nd and 3rd; shared with Osage, Rogers, and Tulsa counties)

== List of members representing the district ==
Member	Years	Party	Cong ress	Electoral history
District established November 16, 1907
Bird Segle McGuire (Pawnee)	Republican	November 16, 1907 – March 3, 1915	60th 61st 62nd 63rd	Elected in 1907. Re-elected in 1908. Re-elected in 1910. Re-elected in 1912. Retired.
James S. Davenport (Vinita)	Democratic	March 4, 1915 – March 3, 1917	64th	Redistricted from the 3rd district and re-elected in 1914. Lost re-election.
Thomas A. Chandler (Vinita)	Republican	March 4, 1917 – March 3, 1919	65th	Elected in 1916. Lost re-election.
Everette B. Howard (Tulsa)	Democratic	March 4, 1919 – March 3, 1921	66th	Elected in 1918. Lost re-election.
Thomas A. Chandler (Vinita)	Republican	March 4, 1921 – March 3, 1923	67th	Elected in 1920. Lost re-election.
Everette B. Howard (Tulsa)	Democratic	March 4, 1923 – March 3, 1925	68th	Elected in 1922. Lost re-election.
Samuel J. Montgomery (Bartlesville)	Republican	March 4, 1925 – March 3, 1927	69th	Elected in 1924. Lost re-election.
Everette B. Howard (Tulsa)	Democratic	March 4, 1927 – March 3, 1929	70th	Elected in 1926. Lost re-election.
Charles O'Connor (Tulsa)	Republican	March 4, 1929 – March 3, 1931	71st	Elected in 1928. Lost re-election.
Wesley E. Disney (Tulsa)	Democratic	March 4, 1931 – January 3, 1945	72nd 73rd 74th 75th 76th 77th 78th	Elected in 1930. Re-elected in 1932. Re-elected in 1934. Re-elected in 1936. Re-elected in 1938. Re-elected in 1940. Re-elected in 1942. Retired to run for U.S. Senator.
George Schwabe (Tulsa)	Republican	January 3, 1945 – January 3, 1949	79th 80th	Elected in 1944. Re-elected in 1946. Lost re-election.
Dixie Gilmer (Tulsa)	Democratic	January 3, 1949 – January 3, 1951	81st	Elected in 1948. Lost re-election.
George Schwabe (Tulsa)	Republican	January 3, 1951 – April 2, 1952	82nd	Elected in 1950. Died.
Vacant		April 2, 1952 – January 3, 1953	82nd	
Page Belcher (Tulsa)	Republican	January 3, 1953 – January 3, 1973	83rd 84th 85th 86th 87th 88th 89th 90th 91st 92nd	Redistricted from the 8th district and re-elected in 1952. Re-elected in 1954. Re-elected in 1956. Re-elected in 1958. Re-elected in 1960. Re-elected in 1962. Re-elected in 1964. Re-elected in 1966. Re-elected in 1968. Re-elected in 1970. Retired.
James R. Jones (Tulsa)	Democratic	January 3, 1973 – January 3, 1987	93rd 94th 95th 96th 97th 98th 99th	Elected in 1972. Re-elected in 1974. Re-elected in 1976. Re-elected in 1978. Re-elected in 1980. Re-elected in 1982. Re-elected in 1984. Retired to run for U.S. Senator.
Jim Inhofe (Tulsa)	Republican	January 3, 1987 – November 15, 1994	100th 101st 102nd 103rd	Elected in 1986. Re-elected in 1988. Re-elected in 1990. Re-elected in 1992. Retired to run for U.S. Senator and resigned when he won.
Vacant		November 15, 1994– November 29, 1994	103rd	
Steve Largent (Tulsa)	Republican	November 29, 1994 – February 15, 2002	103rd 104th 105th 106th 107th	Elected to finish Inhofe's term. Elected to full term in 1994. Re-elected in 1996. Re-elected in 1998. Re-elected in 2000. Resigned to run for Governor of Oklahoma.
John Sullivan (Tulsa)	Republican	February 15, 2002 – January 3, 2013	107th 108th 109th 110th 111th 112th	Elected to finish Largent's term. Re-elected in 2002. Re-elected in 2004. Re-elected in 2006. Re-elected in 2008. Re-elected in 2010. Lost renomination.
Jim Bridenstine (Tulsa)	Republican	January 3, 2013 – April 23, 2018	113th 114th 115th	Elected in 2012. Re-elected in 2014. Re-elected in 2016. Resigned to become NASA Administrator.
Vacant		April 23, 2018 – November 13, 2018	115th	
Kevin Hern (Tulsa)	Republican	November 13, 2018 – present	115th 116th 117th 118th 119th	Appointed early to finish Bridenstine's term, having already been elected to the next term. Elected in 2018. Re-elected in 2020. Re-elected in 2022. Re-elected in 2024. Retired to run for U.S. Senate.
Mark Tedford (Tulsa)	Republican	Assuming office on January 3, 2027		Elected in 2026.

== Recent election results ==
=== 2012 ===
Oklahoma's 1st congressional district, 2012
Party	Candidate	Votes	%
Republican	Jim Bridenstine	181,084	63.5
Democratic	John Olson	91,421	32.0
Independent	Craig Allen	12,807	4.5
Total votes		285,312	100.0
Republican hold			

=== 2014 ===
Bridenstine ran unopposed for re-election.

=== 2016 ===
Bridenstine ran unopposed for re-election.

=== 2018 ===
Oklahoma's 1st congressional district, 2018
Party	Candidate	Votes	%
Republican	Kevin Hern	150,129	59.3
Democratic	Tim Gilpin	103,042	40.7
Total votes		253,171	100.0
Republican hold			

=== 2020 ===
Oklahoma's 1st congressional district, 2020
Party	Candidate	Votes	%
Republican	Kevin Hern (incumbent)	213,700	63.7
Democratic	Kojo Asamoa-Caesar	109,641	32.7
Independent	Evelyn L. Rogers	12,130	3.6
Total votes		335,471	100.0
Republican hold			

=== 2022 ===
Oklahoma's 1st congressional district, 2022
Party	Candidate	Votes	%
Republican	Kevin Hern (incumbent)	142,800	61.1
Democratic	Adam Martin	80,974	34.6
Independent	Evelyn Rogers	9,721	4.1
Total votes		233,495	100.0
Republican hold			

=== 2024 ===
Oklahoma's 1st congressional district, 2024
Party	Candidate	Votes	%
Republican	Kevin Hern (incumbent)	188,832	60.43
Democratic	Dennis Baker	107,903	34.53
Independent	Mark Sanders	15,766	5.05
Total votes		312,501	100.0
Republican hold			

== Historical district boundaries ==
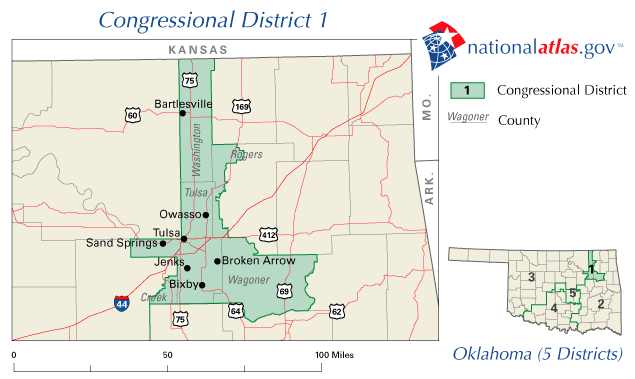
2003 - 2013

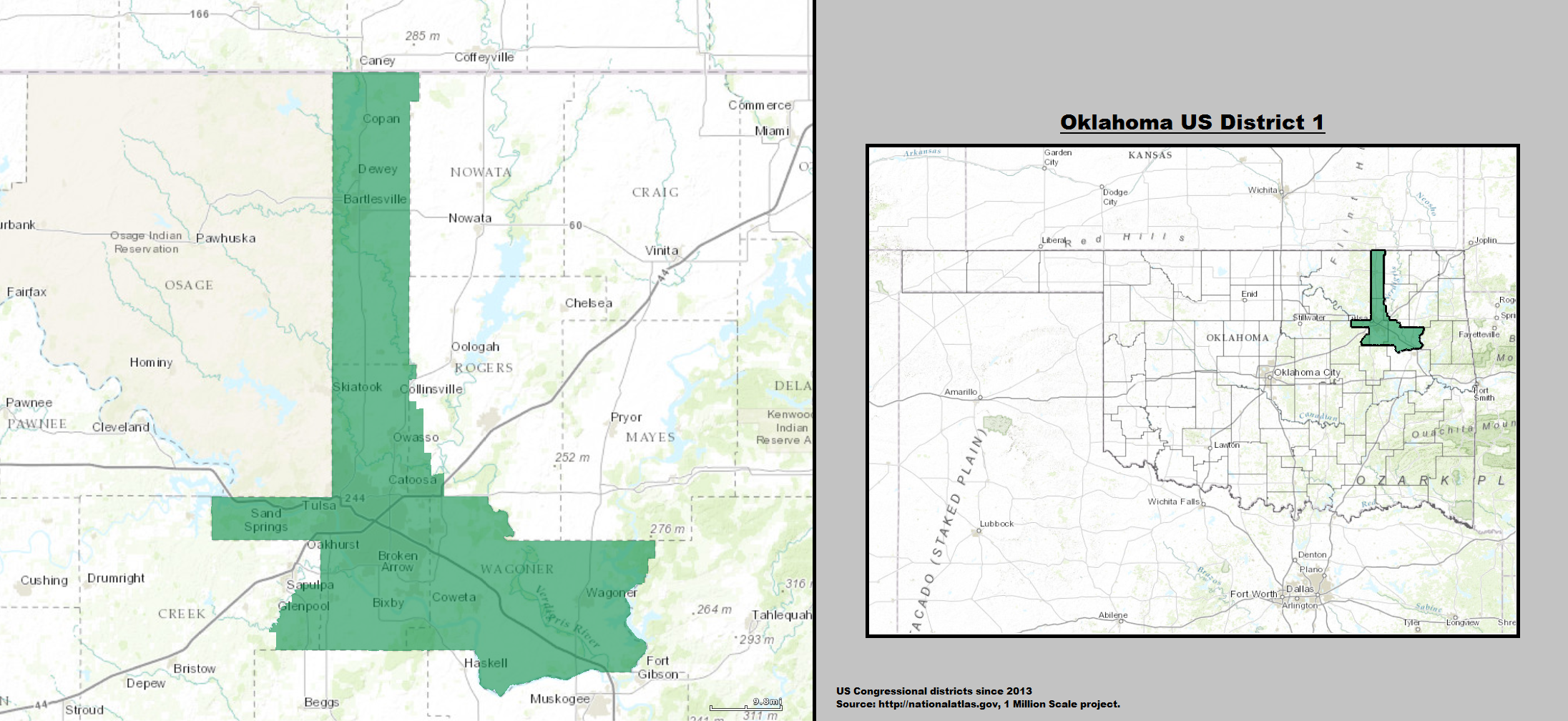
2013 - 2023

== See also ==
- Oklahoma's congressional districts
- List of United States congressional districts
