= Oklahoma's 7th congressional district =

Former U.S. House district from 1913 to 1953

- Obsolete district
- Created: 1915
- Eliminated: 1950
- Years active: 1915–1953

Oklahoma's 7th congressional district was a district that existed from 1915 through 1953, covering the southwestern portion of the state.

== History ==
After the 1910 census, Oklahoma was apportioned three new seats in addition to its five seats. Initially, for the years 1913 through 1915, Oklahoma elected those three new representatives at-large statewide. But starting with the 1914 election (for a term beginning in 1915), the state redistricted its eight seats, thereby adding a 6th district, 7th district, and 8th district

Oklahoma lost this seat in after the 1950 census reapportioned the state with only six seats, with most of the 7th district being merged into the 6th district.

== List of representatives ==
Name	Party	Years	Cong– ress	Electoral history
District established March 4, 1915
James V. McClintic (Snyder)	Democratic	March 4, 1915 – January 3, 1935	64th 65th 66th 67th 68th 69th 70th 71st 72nd 73rd	Elected in 1914. Re-elected in 1916. Re-elected in 1918. Re-elected in 1920. Re-elected in 1922. Re-elected in 1924. Re-elected in 1926. Re-elected in 1928. Re-elected in 1930. Re-elected in 1932. Lost renomination.
Sam C. Massingale (Cordell)	Democratic	January 3, 1935 – January 17, 1941	74th 75th 76th 77th	Elected in 1934. Re-elected in 1936. Re-elected in 1938. Re-elected in 1940. Died.
Vacant		January 17, 1941 – March 31, 1941	77th	
Victor Wickersham (Mangum)	Democratic	April 1, 1941 – January 3, 1947	77th 78th 79th	Elected to finish Massingale's term. Re-elected in 1942. Re-elected in 1944. Lost renomination.
Preston E. Peden (Altus)	Democratic	January 3, 1947 – January 3, 1949	80th	Elected in 1946. Lost renomination.
Victor Wickersham (Mangum)	Democratic	January 3, 1949 – January 3, 1953	81st 82nd	Elected in 1948. Re-elected in 1950. Redistricted to the 6th district.
District dissolved January 3, 1953
