= Percy Lee Gassaway =

American politician

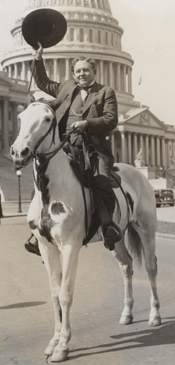

Member of the U.S. House of Representatives from Oklahoma's 4th district
- In office January 3, 1935 – January 3, 1937
- Preceded by: Tom D. McKeown
- Succeeded by: Lyle Boren

Personal details
- Born: August 30, 1885 Waco, Texas, United States
- Died: May 15, 1937 (aged 51) Coalgate, Oklahoma
- Party: Democratic
- Spouses: Laura Weaver Gassaway; Linnie Weeks Gassaway; Loreta Rogers Gassaway; Lillian Fooshee Gassaway
- Children: Clara Olive Gassaway; Percy Lee “Pat” Gassaway; Benjamin Franklin Gassaway; Linnie Lee Gassaway; Loretta Gassaway; Betty Jo Gassaway; Peggy Gassaway; James Gassaway
- Profession: Attorney; politician; judge; rancher

Percy Lee Gassaway (August 30, 1885 – May 15, 1937) was an American politician and a U.S. Representative from Oklahoma.

== Biography ==
Born in Waco, McLennan County, Texas, Gassaway was the son of Rev. B. F. and Elizabeth Scoggins Gassaway. He moved to Fort Sill, Oklahoma (then Indian Territory), with his parents in 1899. A few years later the Gassaway family returned to Texas and purchased the Sinclair Ranch in Lipscomb County. He attended the public schools in Fort Sill and Oklahoma City, Oklahoma. He married Laura Weaver, and they had a daughter. Following a divorce, Gassaway traveled in the West and lived for a time in Mexico. Upon his return to the United States, he married Linnie Weeks, and the couple had two sons and a daughter. The marriage ended in divorce.

== Career ==
In approximately 1915 Gassaway moved to Coalgate, Oklahoma, where he worked in a pool hall. George Trice, an eminent Oklahoma lawyer, took an interest in the young man and encouraged him to study law. Gassaway was employed as a clerk in a law office while he completed a law course and was admitted to the bar in 1918. During this time he married Loreta Rogers, but she soon died. In 1920 Gassaway married Lillian Fooshee. The couple had two daughters and a son and lived on a ranch near Coalgate. He commenced practice in Coalgate, Oklahoma as well as farming and ranching.

Gassaway was appointed county judge of Coal County, Oklahoma, in 1923, elected in 1924, and served until 1926. He served as district judge of the twenty-sixth judicial district from 1926 to 1934.

Elected as a Democrat to the Seventy-fourth Congress, Gassaway served from January 3, 1935 to January 3, 1937. He was an unsuccessful candidate for renomination in 1936, and resumed the practice of law and also engaged as a rancher near Coalgate, Oklahoma.

== Death ==
Gassaway died in Coalgate, Coal County, Oklahoma, on May 15, 1937 (age 51 years, 258 days). He is interred at Coalgate Cemetery in Coalgate.

U.S. House of Representatives
Preceded by Tom D. McKeown	Member of the U.S. House of Representatives from Oklahoma's 4th congressional district 1935-1937	Succeeded by Lyle Boren
