= Sam C. Massingale =

American politician (1870–1941)

Samuel Chapman Massingale
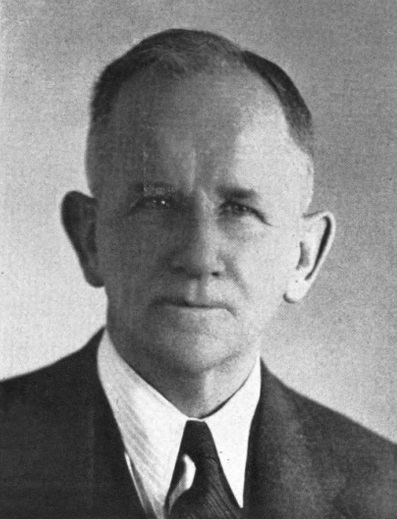

Member of the U.S. House of Representatives from Oklahoma's 7th district
- In office January 3, 1935 – January 17, 1941
- Preceded by: James V. McClintic
- Succeeded by: Victor Wickersham

Member of the Oklahoma Territorial Council from the 12th district
- In office 1903–1905
- Preceded by: A. G. Updegraff
- Succeeded by: B. N. Woodson

Personal details
- Born: August 2, 1870 Quitman, Mississippi, United States
- Died: January 17, 1941 (aged 70) Washington, D.C.
- Party: Democratic
- Spouse: Anna Canaday Massingale
- Education: University of Mississippi at Oxford

Military service
- Allegiance: United States of America
- Branch/service: United States Army
- Rank: Private
- Unit: Company D, Second Texas Infantry
- Battles/wars: Spanish–American War

Samuel Chapman Massingale (August 2, 1870 – January 17, 1941) was an American politician who served as the U.S. representative for Oklahoma's 7th congressional district from 1935 to 1941.

== Biography ==
Born in Quitman, Mississippi, Massingale was the son of George M. and Martha McGowan Massingale, and attended the public schools and the University of Mississippi at Oxford where he studied law.

== Career ==
Massingale moved to Fort Worth, Texas in 1887 and was employed for a short time as a section hand while he continued to study law. He was admitted to the bar in 1895 and commenced practice in Cordell, Oklahoma, in 1900.

During the Spanish–American War, Massingale served as a private in Company D, Second Texas Infantry. He served as a member of the Oklahoma Territorial Council in 1902. The following year he married Anna Canaday, and they had four children. He ran unsuccessfully for the Sixtieth Congress in 1906.

Massingale was elected as a Democrat to the Seventy-fourth and to the three succeeding Congresses and served from January 3, 1935, until his death on January 17, 1941.

== Death ==
Massingale died in Washington, D.C., January 17, 1941 (age 70 years, 168 days). He is interred in Lawnview Cemetery, Cordell, Oklahoma.

== See also ==
- List of members of the United States Congress who died in office (1900–1949)

U.S. House of Representatives
Preceded by James V. McClintic	Member of the U.S. House of Representatives from Oklahoma's 7th congressional district 1935–1941	Succeeded by Victor Wickersham
