= 1936 United States House of Representatives elections =

House elections for the 75th U.S. Congress

- November 3, 1936 (Note: September 14, 1936, in Maine and September 8, 1936, in Alaska Territory)

All 435 seats in the United States House of Representatives 218 seats needed for a majority
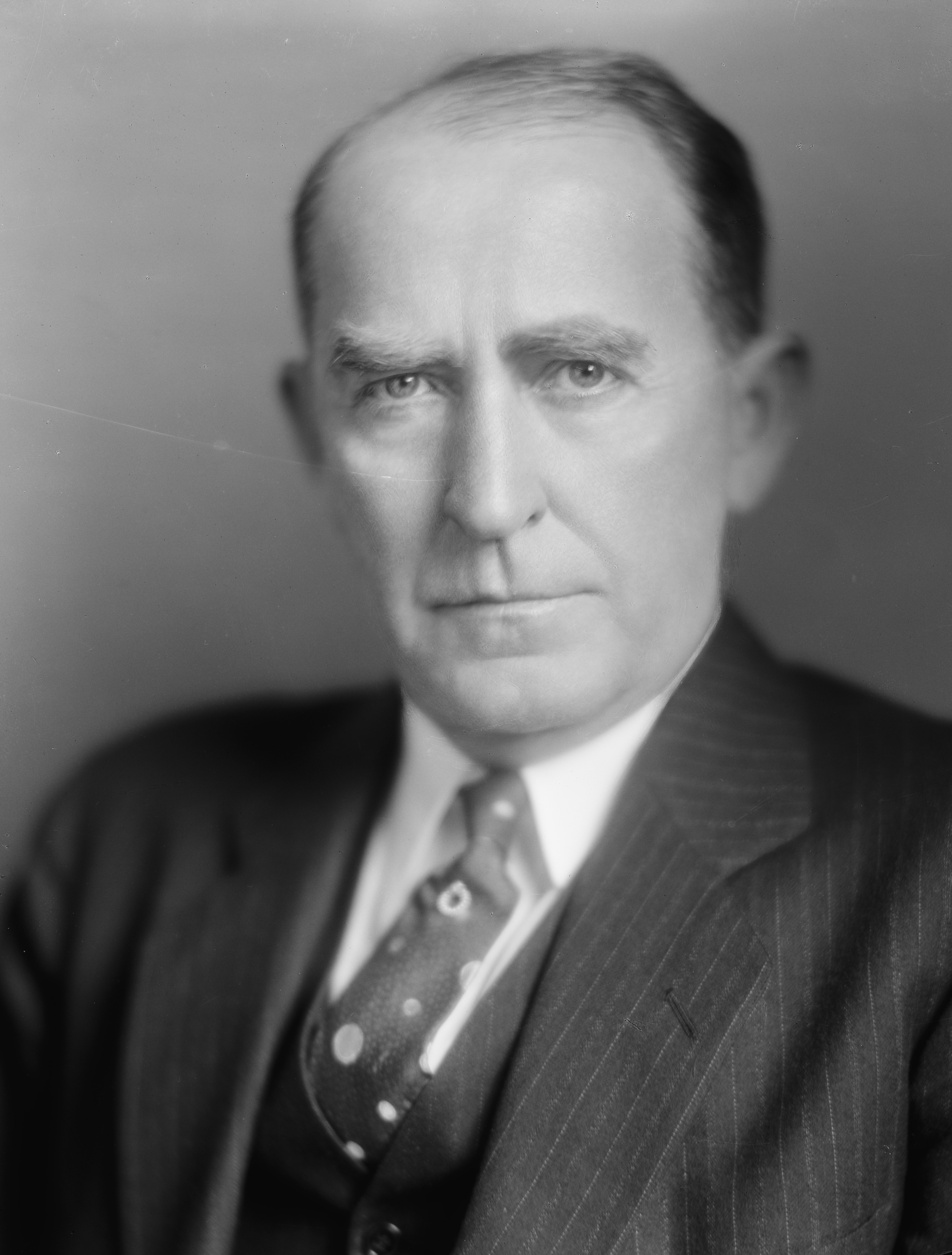

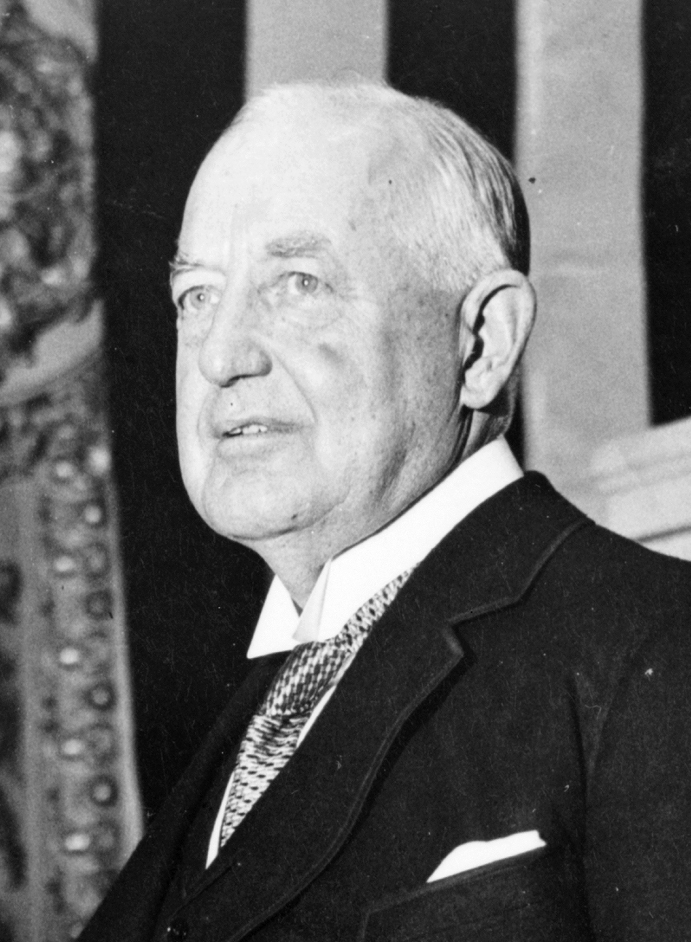
	Majority party	Minority party
Leader	William B. Bankhead	Bertrand Snell
Party	Democratic	Republican
Leader since	June 4, 1936	March 4, 1931
Leader's seat	Alabama 7th	New York 31st
Last election	322 seats	103 seats
Seats won	334	88
Seat change	▲12	▼15
Popular vote	23,967,625	16,999,723
Percentage	55.93%	39.67%
Swing	▲2.01pp	▼1.62pp
	Third party	Fourth party
Party	Progressive	Farmer–Labor
Last election	7 seats	3 seats
Seats won	8	5
Seat change	▲1	▲2
Popular vote	546,833	481,960
Percentage	1.28%	1.13%
Swing	▼0.03pp	▼0.08%
Speaker before election
William Bankhead
Democratic
Elected Speaker
William Bankhead
Democratic

The 1936 United States House of Representatives elections were elections for the United States House of Representatives to elect members to serve in the 75th United States Congress. They were held for the most part on November 3, 1936, while Maine held theirs on September 14. They coincided with President Franklin D. Roosevelt's landslide re-election. Roosevelt's Democratic Party gained twelve net seats from the Republican Party, bringing them above a three-fourths majority. This was the largest majority since Reconstruction, as the last time a party won so decisively was in 1866. To date, this was the last time that any party held three-quarters of all House seats, as well as the last time that a party won more than 300 House seats.

Significant representation from the Progressives of Wisconsin and Farmer–Labor Party of Minnesota was also seen, as these two liberal populist groups gained a foothold.

The 1936 elections showed the continuing trust of the American people in Roosevelt to guide the nation out of the Great Depression. Despite setbacks, most had faith in the New Deal and elected leaders who supported its measures. This was the last of four straight elections where Republicans lost seats in Congress due to the lingering effects of the Depression.

== Overall results ==
↓
334	13	88
Democratic	(Note: Progressives won 8 seats and Farmer–Labor won 5.)	Republican

Source: Election Statistics – Office of the Clerk

House seats
Democratic	76.78%
Republican	20.23%
Progressive	1.84%
Farmer–Labor	1.15%

Popular vote
Democratic	55.93%
Republican	39.67%
Progressive	1.28%
Farmer–Labor	1.13%
Union	1.08%
Socialist	0.40%

Results shaded according to winning candidate's share of the popular vote

Composition of the House after the election

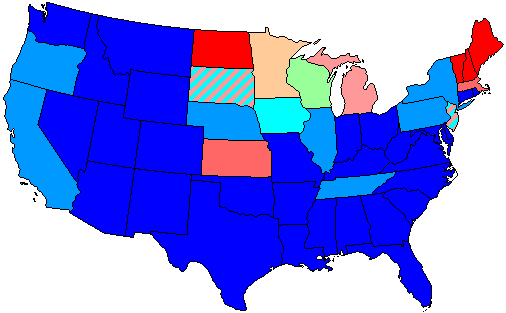
House seats by party holding plurality in state: 80+% Democratic / 80+% Republican; 60+ to 80% Democratic / 60+ to 80% Republican / 60+ to 80% Progressive; Up to 60% Democratic / Up to 60% Republican / Up to 60% Farmer–Labor

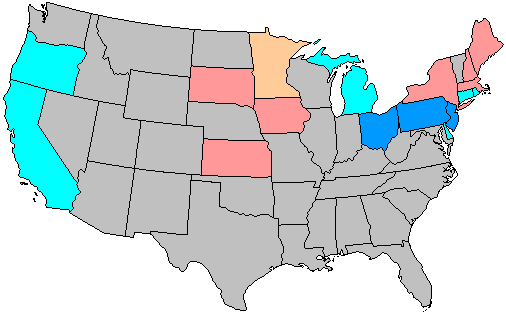
Net gain in states' seats 6+ Democratic gain 3-5 Democratic gain: 1-2 Democratic gain / 1-2 Republican gain / 1-2 Farmer–Labor gain; no net change

== Special elections ==
District	Incumbent			This race	
District	Member	Party	First elected	Results	Candidates
Philippines at-large	Francisco A. Delgado	Nacionalista	1934	Incumbent resigned February 14, 1936, after a successor qualified in accordance to a new form of government. New resident commissioner appointed February 14, 1936. Nacionalista hold. Winner was to hold office at the pleasure of the President of the Philippines.	▌ ✓ Quintin Paredes (Nacionalista)
Ohio at-large	Charles V. Truax	Democratic	1932	Incumbent died August 9, 1935. New member elected November 3, 1936. Democratic hold. Winner was not elected to the next term; see below.	▌ ✓ Daniel S. Earhart (Democratic) 58.31%; ▌Benson Ogier (Republican) 41.69%
Ohio 11	Mell G. Underwood	Democratic	1922	Incumbent resigned April 10, 1936, after being appointed to the U.S. District Court for the Southern District of Ohio. New member elected November 3, 1936. Democratic hold. Winner was not elected to the next term; see below.	▌ ✓ Peter F. Hammond (Democratic) 56.45%; ▌John L. Moriarty (Republican) 43.55%
South Carolina 4	John J. McSwain	Democratic	1920	Incumbent died August 6, 1936. New member elected November 3, 1936. Democratic hold. Winner was also elected to the next term; see below.	▌ ✓ Gabriel H. Mahon Jr. (Democratic); Uncontested

== Alabama ==
District	Incumbent			This race	
District	Member	Party	First elected	Results	Candidates
Alabama 1	Frank W. Boykin	Democratic	1935 (special)	Incumbent re-elected.	▌ ✓ Frank W. Boykin (Democratic) 100.0%; ▌Frank Bunkley (Write-in) 0.01%
Alabama 2	J. Lister Hill	Democratic	1923 (special)	Incumbent re-elected.	▌ ✓ J. Lister Hill (Democratic) 99.1%; ▌J. W. Clemmons (Union) 0.9%
Alabama 3	Henry B. Steagall	Democratic	1914	Incumbent re-elected.	▌ ✓ Henry B. Steagall (Democratic); Uncontested
Alabama 4	Sam Hobbs	Democratic	1934	Incumbent re-elected.	▌ ✓ Sam Hobbs (Democratic) 86.4%; ▌Charles R. Robinson (Republican) 13.6%
Alabama 5	Joe Starnes	Democratic	1934	Incumbent re-elected.	▌ ✓ Joe Starnes (Democratic); Uncontested
Alabama 6	William Bacon Oliver	Democratic	1914	Incumbent retired. Democratic hold.	▌ ✓ Pete Jarman (Democratic); Uncontested
Alabama 7	William B. Bankhead	Democratic	1916	Incumbent re-elected.	▌ ✓ William B. Bankhead (Democratic) 73.0%; ▌J. B. Weaver (Republican) 27.0%
Alabama 8	Archibald Hill Carmichael	Democratic	1933 (special)	Incumbent retired. Democratic hold.	▌ ✓ John Sparkman (Democratic) 99.7%; ▌Harry J. Frahn (Union) 0.3%
Alabama 9	George Huddleston	Democratic	1914	Incumbent lost renomination. Democratic hold.	▌ ✓ Luther Patrick (Democratic) 91.8%; ▌J. G. Bass (Republican) 8.0%; ▌W. S. Glazener (Union) 0.2%

== Arizona ==
Results by county Murdock: 70–80% 80–90% >90%

District	Incumbent			This race	
District	Member	Party	First elected	Results	Candidates
Arizona at-large	Isabella Greenway	Democratic	1933 (special)	Incumbent retired. Democratic hold.	▌ ✓ John R. Murdock (Democratic) 68.6%; ▌George L. Burgess (Republican) 29.4%; ▌E. C. Whitesitt (Union) 1.5%; ▌A. B. Potter (Socialist) 0.4%

== Arkansas ==
District	Incumbent			This race	
District	Member	Party	First elected	Results	Candidates
Arkansas 1	William J. Driver	Democratic	1920	Incumbent re-elected.	▌ ✓ William J. Driver (Democratic); Uncontested
Arkansas 2	John E. Miller	Democratic	1930	Incumbent re-elected.	▌ ✓ John E. Miller (Democratic); Uncontested
Arkansas 3	Claude Fuller	Democratic	1928	Incumbent re-elected.	▌ ✓ Claude Fuller (Democratic); Uncontested
Arkansas 4	William B. Cravens	Democratic	1932	Incumbent re-elected.	▌ ✓ William B. Cravens (Democratic); Uncontested
Arkansas 5	David D. Terry	Democratic	1933 (special)	Incumbent re-elected.	▌ ✓ David D. Terry (Democratic); Uncontested
Arkansas 6	John L. McClellan	Democratic	1934	Incumbent re-elected.	▌ ✓ John L. McClellan (Democratic); Uncontested
Arkansas 7	Tilman B. Parks	Democratic	1920	Incumbent retired. Democratic hold.	▌ ✓ Wade H. Kitchens (Democratic); Uncontested

== California ==
California's results

District	Incumbent			This race	
District	Member	Party	First elected	Results	Candidates
California 1	Clarence F. Lea	Democratic	1916	Incumbent re-elected.	▌ ✓ Clarence F. Lea (Democratic) 53.8%; ▌Nelson B. Van Matre (Republican) 45.1%; ▌Vernon Dennis Healy (Communist) 1.1%
California 2	Harry Lane Englebright	Republican	1926	Incumbent re-elected.	▌ ✓ Harry Lane Englebright (Republican); Uncontested
California 3	Frank H. Buck	Democratic	1932	Incumbent re-elected.	▌ ✓ Frank H. Buck (Democratic) 90.6%; ▌Walter Schaefer (Write-in) 5.2%; ▌Perry Hill (Communist) 4.3%
California 4	Florence Prag Kahn	Republican	1925 (special)	Incumbent lost re-election. Progressive gain.	▌ ✓ Franck R. Havenner (Progressive) 58.5%; ▌Florence Prag Kahn (Republican) 40.0%; ▌Anita Whitney (Communist) 1.6%
California 5	Richard J. Welch	Republican	1926	Incumbent re-elected.	▌ ✓ Richard J. Welch (Republican) 94.8%; ▌Lawrence Ross (Communist) 5.2%
California 6	Albert E. Carter	Republican	1924	Incumbent re-elected.	▌ ✓ Albert E. Carter (Republican) 91.0%; ▌Clarence E. Rust (Socialist) 7.2%; ▌Lloyd L. Harris (Communist) 1.8%
California 7	John H. Tolan	Democratic	1934	Incumbent re-elected.	▌ ✓ John H. Tolan (Democratic) 59.8%; ▌Charles W. Fisher (Republican) 40.2%
California 8	John J. McGrath	Democratic	1932	Incumbent re-elected.	▌ ✓ John J. McGrath (Democratic) 57.6%; ▌Alonzo L. Baker (Republican) 42.4%
California 9	Bertrand W. Gearhart	Republican	1934	Incumbent re-elected.	▌ ✓ Bertrand W. Gearhart (Republican) 97.0%; ▌Carl B. Patterson (Communist) 3.0%
California 10	Henry E. Stubbs	Democratic	1932	Incumbent re-elected.	▌ ✓ Henry E. Stubbs (Democratic) 69.6%; ▌George R. Bliss (Republican) 30.4%
California 11	John S. McGroarty	Democratic	1934	Incumbent re-elected.	▌ ✓ John S. McGroarty (Democratic) 50.5%; ▌John Carl Hinshaw (Republican) 39.8%; ▌Robert S. Funk (Progressive) 8.9%; ▌William Ingham (Communist) 0.8%
California 12	John H. Hoeppel	Democratic	1932	Incumbent lost renomination. Democratic hold.	▌ ✓ Jerry Voorhis (Democratic) 53.7%; ▌Frederick F. Houser (Republican) 46.3%
California 13	Charles Kramer	Democratic	1932	Incumbent re-elected.	▌ ✓ Charles Kramer (Democratic) 90.0%; ▌Floyd Seaman (Write-in) 5.2%; ▌Emma Cutler (Communist) 4.8%
California 14	Thomas F. Ford	Democratic	1932	Incumbent re-elected.	▌ ✓ Thomas F. Ford (Democratic) 61.0%; ▌William D. Campbell (Republican) 24.6%; ▌Albert L. Johnson (Progressive) 12.4%; ▌Harold J. Ashe (Communist) 1.3%; ▌Glen Trimble (Socialist) 0.7%
California 15	John M. Costello	Democratic	1934	Incumbent re-elected.	▌ ✓ John M. Costello (Democratic) 69.0%; ▌Ernest Walker Sawyer (Republican) 31.0%
California 16	John F. Dockweiler	Democratic	1932	Incumbent re-elected.	▌ ✓ John F. Dockweiler (Democratic) 57.7%; ▌Raymond V. Darby (Republican) 42.3%
California 17	Charles J. Colden	Democratic	1932	Incumbent re-elected.	▌ ✓ Charles J. Colden (Democratic) 71.9%; ▌Leonard Roach (Republican) 26.4%; ▌John L. Leech (Communist) 1.7%
California 18	Byron N. Scott	Democratic	1934	Incumbent re-elected.	▌ ✓ Byron N. Scott (Democratic) 59.0%; ▌James F. Collins (Republican) 41.0%
California 19	Sam L. Collins	Republican	1932	Incumbent lost re-election. Democratic gain.	▌ ✓ Harry R. Sheppard (Democratic) 53.8%; ▌Sam L. Collins (Republican) 45.2%; ▌Charles McLauchlan (Communist) 1.0%
California 20	George Burnham	Republican	1932	Incumbent retired. Democratic gain.	▌ ✓ Edouard Izac (Democratic) 56.4%; ▌Edward P. Sample (Republican) 42.8%; ▌Esco L. Richardson (Communist) 0.9%

== Colorado ==
District	Incumbent			This race	
District	Member	Party	First elected	Results	Candidates
Colorado 1	Lawrence Lewis	Democratic	1932	Incumbent re-elected.	▌ ✓ Lawrence Lewis (Democratic) 69.0%; ▌Harry Zimmerhackel (Republican) 28.5%; ▌Louella Grant Shirley (Farmer–Labor) 1.8%; ▌F. S. Kidneigh (Socialist) 0.7%
Colorado 2	Fred N. Cummings	Democratic	1932	Incumbent re-elected.	▌ ✓ Fred N. Cummings (Democratic) 53.3%; ▌George H. Bradfield (Republican) 45.8%; ▌George L. Slater (Socialist) 0.9%
Colorado 3	John Andrew Martin	Democratic	1932	Incumbent re-elected.	▌ ✓ John Andrew Martin (Democratic) 60.2%; ▌J. Arthur Phelps (Republican) 39.8%
Colorado 4	Edward T. Taylor	Democratic	1908	Incumbent re-elected.	▌ ✓ Edward T. Taylor (Democratic) 65.5%; ▌John S. Woody (Republican) 34.5%

== Connecticut ==
District	Incumbent			This race	
District	Member	Party	First elected	Results	Candidates
Connecticut 1	Herman P. Kopplemann	Democratic	1932	Incumbent re-elected.	▌ ✓ Herman P. Kopplemann (Democratic) 57.9%; ▌Walter E. Batterson (Republican) 37.6%; ▌John J. Godfrey (Union) 3.9%; ▌Max Reiner (Socialist) 0.5%; ▌Richard X. Farber (Communist) 0.2%
Connecticut 2	William L. Higgins	Republican	1932	Incumbent lost re-election. Democratic gain.	▌ ✓ William J. Fitzgerald (Democratic) 50.9%; ▌William L. Higgins (Republican) 46.3%; ▌James I. Mundell (Union) 2.3%; ▌Harold C. White (Socialist) 0.5%
Connecticut 3	James A. Shanley	Democratic	1934	Incumbent re-elected.	▌ ✓ James A. Shanley (Democratic) 54.6%; ▌John F. Lynch (Republican) 40.4%; ▌C. Joseph Rowley (Union) 3.8%; ▌Carl M. Rhodin (Socialist) 0.9%; ▌Emma Davis (Communist) 0.2%
Connecticut 4	Schuyler Merritt	Republican	1932	Incumbent lost re-election. Democratic gain.	▌ ✓ Alfred N. Phillips (Democratic) 50.0%; ▌Schuyler Merritt (Republican) 41.9%; ▌George W. Murgatroyd (Socialist) 4.8%; ▌Richard F. Warren (Union) 3.1%; ▌Louis Scala (Communist) 0.2%
Connecticut 5	J. Joseph Smith	Democratic	1934	Incumbent re-elected.	▌ ✓ J. Joseph Smith (Democratic) 58.8%; ▌J. Warren Upson (Republican) 41.2%
Connecticut at-large	William M. Citron	Democratic	1934	Incumbent re-elected.	▌ ✓ William M. Citron (Democratic) 53.9%; ▌Lousi Pallotti (Republican) 41.0%; ▌Charles T. Tryon (Union) 3.1%; ▌Martin F. Plunkett (Socialist) 1.6%; ▌Andrew Jacob (Socialist Labor) 0.2%; ▌Ronald H. Loomis (Communist) 0.2%

== Delaware ==
District	Incumbent			This race	
District	Member	Party	First elected	Results	Candidates
Delaware at-large	J. George Stewart	Republican	1934	Incumbent lost re-election. Democratic gain.	▌ ✓ William F. Allen (Democratic) 51.7%; ▌J. George Stewart (Republican) 43.9%; ▌James A. Ellison (Ind. Republican) 4.2%; ▌William A. Mayor (Socialist) 0.1%

== Florida ==
District	Incumbent			This race	
District	Member	Party	First elected	Results	Candidates
Florida 1	J. Hardin Peterson	Democratic	1932	Incumbent re-elected.	▌ ✓ J. Hardin Peterson (Democratic) 74.5%; ▌B. L. Hammer (Republican) 25.5%
Florida 2	Robert A. Green	Democratic	1932	Incumbent re-elected.	▌ ✓ Robert A. Green (Democratic); Uncontested
Florida 3	Millard Caldwell	Democratic	1932	Incumbent re-elected.	▌ ✓ Millard Caldwell (Democratic); Uncontested
Florida 4	J. Mark Wilcox	Democratic	1932	Incumbent re-elected.	▌ ✓ J. Mark Wilcox (Democratic) 70.6%; ▌Thomas E. Swanson (Republican) 29.4%
Florida 5	William J. Sears; Redistricted from the at-large district	Democratic	1932	Incumbent lost renomination. Democratic hold.	▌ ✓ Joe Hendricks (Democratic) 79.9%; ▌C. F. Batchelder (Republican) 20.1%

== Georgia ==
District	Incumbent			This race	
District	Member	Party	First elected	Results	Candidates
Georgia 1	Hugh Peterson	Democratic	1934	Incumbent re-elected.	▌ ✓ Hugh Peterson (Democratic); Uncontested
Georgia 2	Edward E. Cox	Democratic	1924	Incumbent re-elected.	▌ ✓ Edward E. Cox (Democratic); Uncontested
Georgia 3	Bryant T. Castellow	Democratic	1932	Incumbent retired. Democratic hold.	▌ ✓ Stephen Pace (Democratic); Uncontested
Georgia 4	Emmett Marshall Owen	Democratic	1932	Incumbent re-elected.	▌ ✓ Emmett Marshall Owen (Democratic); Uncontested
Georgia 5	Robert Ramspeck	Democratic	1929 (special)	Incumbent re-elected.	▌ ✓ Robert Ramspeck (Democratic) 89.4%; ▌Henry A. Alexander (Republican) 10.6%
Georgia 6	Carl Vinson	Democratic	1914	Incumbent re-elected.	▌ ✓ Carl Vinson (Democratic); Uncontested
Georgia 7	Malcolm C. Tarver	Democratic	1926	Incumbent re-elected.	▌ ✓ Malcolm C. Tarver (Democratic) 92.1%; ▌L. Mitchell Johnson (Ind. Republican) 7.9%
Georgia 8	Braswell Deen	Democratic	1932	Incumbent re-elected.	▌ ✓ Braswell Deen (Democratic) 94.5%; ▌Ben J. Ford (Republican) 5.5%
Georgia 9	B. Frank Whelchel	Democratic	1934	Incumbent re-elected.	▌ ✓ B. Frank Whelchel (Democratic) 75.9%; ▌John M. Johnson (Republican) 24.1%
Georgia 10	Paul Brown	Democratic	1933 (special)	Incumbent re-elected.	▌ ✓ Paul Brown (Democratic); Uncontested

== Idaho ==
District	Incumbent			This race	
District	Member	Party	First elected	Results	Candidates
Idaho 1	Compton I. White	Democratic	1932	Incumbent re-elected.	▌ ✓ Compton I. White (Democratic) 70.3%; ▌John S. Hackathorn (Republican) 29.7%
Idaho 2	D. Worth Clark	Democratic	1934	Incumbent re-elected.	▌ ✓ D. Worth Clark (Democratic) 60.5%; ▌Henry Dworshak (Republican) 39.5%

== Illinois ==
District	Incumbent			This race	
District	Member	Party	First elected	Results	Candidates
Illinois 1	Arthur W. Mitchell	Democratic	1934	Incumbent re-elected.	▌ ✓ Arthur W. Mitchell (Democratic) 55.1%; ▌Oscar Stanton De Priest (Republican) 44.6%; ▌Harry Haywood (Independent) 0.3%
Illinois 2	Raymond S. McKeough	Democratic	1934	Incumbent re-elected.	▌ ✓ Raymond S. McKeough (Democratic) 55.6%; ▌P. H. Moynihan (Republican) 44.4%
Illinois 3	Edward A. Kelly	Democratic	1930	Incumbent re-elected.	▌ ✓ Edward A. Kelly (Democratic) 59.2%; ▌Frank M. Fulton (Republican) 40.3%; ▌J. Fred Dee (Independent) 0.5%
Illinois 4	Harry P. Beam	Democratic	1930	Incumbent re-elected.	▌ ✓ Harry P. Beam (Democratic) 80.8%; ▌Irene A. Tomas (Republican) 19.2%
Illinois 5	Adolph J. Sabath	Democratic	1906	Incumbent re-elected.	▌ ✓ Adolph J. Sabath (Democratic) 77.4%; ▌Max Price (Republican) 22.6%
Illinois 6	Thomas J. O'Brien	Democratic	1932	Incumbent re-elected.	▌ ✓ Thomas J. O'Brien (Democratic) 65.5%; ▌Frederick A. Virkus (Republican) 34.5%
Illinois 7	Leonard W. Schuetz	Democratic	1930	Incumbent re-elected.	▌ ✓ Leonard W. Schuetz (Democratic) 59.1%; ▌James C. Moreland (Republican) 37.7%; ▌Austin J. Mangan (Independent) 3.1%
Illinois 8	Leo Kocialkowski	Democratic	1932	Incumbent re-elected.	▌ ✓ Leo Kocialkowski (Democratic) 78.6%; ▌Edward Richard Piszatowski (Republican) 20.4%; ▌Edwin C. Gordon (Union Progressive) 1.0%
Illinois 9	James McAndrews	Democratic	1934	Incumbent re-elected.	▌ ✓ James McAndrews (Democratic) 59.2%; ▌Bertha Baur (Republican) 40.8%
Illinois 10	Ralph E. Church	Republican	1934	Incumbent re-elected.	▌ ✓ Ralph E. Church (Republican) 51.4%; ▌Charles J. Wightman (Democratic) 45.5%; ▌H. Truman Gordon (Independent) 3.2%
Illinois 11	Chauncey W. Reed	Republican	1934	Incumbent re-elected.	▌ ✓ Chauncey W. Reed (Republican) 56.0%; ▌John R. Barber (Democratic) 44.0%
Illinois 12	John T. Buckbee	Republican	1926	Incumbent retired. Republican hold.	▌ ✓ Noah M. Mason (Republican) 51.6%; ▌D. O. Thompson (Democratic) 43.1%; ▌D. S. Gishmiller (Townsend) 5.3%
Illinois 13	Leo E. Allen	Republican	1932	Incumbent re-elected.	▌ ✓ Leo E. Allen (Republican) 58.4%; ▌David L. Trunck (Democratic) 41.6%
Illinois 14	Chester C. Thompson	Democratic	1932	Incumbent re-elected.	▌ ✓ Chester C. Thompson (Democratic) 54.4%; ▌Clinton Searle (Republican) 45.6%
Illinois 15	J. Leroy Adair	Democratic	1932	Incumbent retired. Democratic hold.	▌ ✓ Lewis L. Boyer (Democratic) 49.4%; ▌Joe E. Anderson (Republican) 48.3%; ▌Walter A. Thomas (Independent) 2.4%
Illinois 16	Everett Dirksen	Republican	1932	Incumbent re-elected.	▌ ✓ Everett Dirksen (Republican) 53.2%; ▌Charles C. Dickman (Democratic) 46.8%
Illinois 17	Leslie C. Arends	Republican	1934	Incumbent re-elected.	▌ ✓ Leslie C. Arends (Republican) 52.6%; ▌Frank Gillespie (Democratic) 47.4%
Illinois 18	James A. Meeks	Democratic	1932	Incumbent re-elected.	▌ ✓ James A. Meeks (Democratic) 53.8%; ▌High M. Luckey (Republican) 46.2%
Illinois 19	Donald C. Dobbins	Democratic	1932	Incumbent retired. Democratic hold.	▌ ✓ Hugh M. Rigney (Democratic) 55.7%; ▌William H. Wheat (Republican) 44.3%
Illinois 20	Scott W. Lucas	Democratic	1934	Incumbent re-elected.	▌ ✓ Scott W. Lucas (Democratic) 56.7%; ▌Harry C. Montgomery (Republican) 43.3%
Illinois 21	Harry H. Mason	Democratic	1934	Incumbent retired. Democratic hold.	▌ ✓ Frank W. Fries (Democratic) 51.7%; ▌Frank M. Ramey (Republican) 48.2%; ▌William Jackson (Independent) 0.1%
Illinois 22	Edwin M. Schaefer	Democratic	1932	Incumbent re-elected.	▌ ✓ Edwin M. Schaefer (Democratic) 59.1%; ▌Jesse R. Brown (Republican) 40.9%
Illinois 23	William W. Arnold	Democratic	1922	Incumbent resigned June 25, 1936 to become a member of the U.S. Board of Tax Appeals. Democratic hold.	▌ ✓ Laurence F. Arnold (Democratic) 55.2%; ▌Ben O. Sumner (Republican) 44.8%
Illinois 24	Claude V. Parsons	Democratic	1930	Incumbent re-elected.	▌ ✓ Claude V. Parsons (Democratic) 51.7%; ▌W. A. Spence (Republican) 48.3%
Illinois 25	Kent E. Keller	Democratic	1930	Incumbent re-elected.	▌ ✓ Kent E. Keller (Democratic) 53.9%; ▌J. Lester Buford (Republican) 46.1%
Illinois at-large	Michael L. Igoe	Democratic	1934	Incumbent resigned June 2, 1935 to become a U.S. Attorney. Democratic hold.	▌ ✓ Lewis M. Long (Democratic) 27.8%; ▌ ✓ Edwin V. Champion (Democratic) 27.4%; ▌Rodney H. Brandon (Republican) 21.1%; ▌John T. Dempsey (Republican) 21.1%; ▌Severin H. Hanson (Progressive) 1.1%; ▌Rad Burnett (Progressive) 1.1%; ▌Ina M. White (Socialist) 0.1%; ▌Nate Egnor (Socialist) 0.1%; ▌Mary Morgan Williams (Prohibition) 0.04%; ▌Frank Earl Herrick (Prohibition) 0.04%; ▌Edward K. Schooley (Socialist Labor) 0.03%; ▌Mathilda M. Deavers (Socialist Labor) 0.03%
Illinois at-large	Martin A. Brennan	Democratic	1932	Incumbent retired. Democratic hold.	▌ ✓ Lewis M. Long (Democratic) 27.8%; ▌ ✓ Edwin V. Champion (Democratic) 27.4%; ▌Rodney H. Brandon (Republican) 21.1%; ▌John T. Dempsey (Republican) 21.1%; ▌Severin H. Hanson (Progressive) 1.1%; ▌Rad Burnett (Progressive) 1.1%; ▌Ina M. White (Socialist) 0.1%; ▌Nate Egnor (Socialist) 0.1%; ▌Mary Morgan Williams (Prohibition) 0.04%; ▌Frank Earl Herrick (Prohibition) 0.04%; ▌Edward K. Schooley (Socialist Labor) 0.03%; ▌Mathilda M. Deavers (Socialist Labor) 0.03%

== Indiana ==
District	Incumbent			This race	
District	Member	Party	First elected	Results	Candidates
Indiana 1	William T. Schulte	Democratic	1932	Incumbent re-elected.	▌ ✓ William T. Schulte (Democratic) 66.6%; ▌Fred F. Schultz (Republican) 33.4%
Indiana 2	Charles A. Halleck	Republican	1935 (special)	Incumbent re-elected.	▌ ✓ Charles A. Halleck (Republican) 51.7%; ▌Hugh A. Barnhart (Democratic) 48.3%
Indiana 3	Samuel B. Pettengill	Democratic	1930	Incumbent re-elected.	▌ ✓ Samuel B. Pettengill (Democratic) 57.6%; ▌Andrew J. Hickey (Republican) 42.4%
Indiana 4	James I. Farley	Democratic	1932	Incumbent re-elected.	▌ ✓ James I. Farley (Democratic) 55.2%; ▌David Hogg (Republican) 44.8%
Indiana 5	Glenn Griswold	Democratic	1930	Incumbent re-elected.	▌ ✓ Glenn Griswold (Democratic) 52.7%; ▌Benjamin J. Brown (Republican) 47.3%
Indiana 6	Virginia E. Jenckes	Democratic	1932	Incumbent re-elected.	▌ ✓ Virginia E. Jenckes (Democratic) 55.1%; ▌Noble J. Johnson (Republican) 44.9%
Indiana 7	Arthur H. Greenwood	Democratic	1922	Incumbent re-elected.	▌ ✓ Arthur H. Greenwood (Democratic) 53.9%; ▌Gerald W. Landis (Republican) 46.1%
Indiana 8	John W. Boehne Jr.	Democratic	1930	Incumbent re-elected.	▌ ✓ John W. Boehne Jr. (Democratic) 63.9%; ▌Charles F. Werner (Republican) 36.1%
Indiana 9	Eugene B. Crowe	Democratic	1930	Incumbent re-elected.	▌ ✓ Eugene B. Crowe (Democratic) 54.3%; ▌Chester A. Davis (Republican) 45.7%
Indiana 10	Finly Hutchinson Gray	Democratic	1932	Incumbent re-elected.	▌ ✓ Finly Hutchinson Gray (Democratic) 52.6%; ▌Clarence M. Brown (Republican) 47.4%
Indiana 11	William H. Larrabee	Democratic	1930	Incumbent re-elected.	▌ ✓ William H. Larrabee (Democratic) 60.0%; ▌Don F. Roberts (Republican) 40.0%
Indiana 12	Louis Ludlow	Democratic	1928	Incumbent re-elected.	▌ ✓ Louis Ludlow (Democratic) 58.5%; ▌Homer Elliott (Republican) 41.5%

== Iowa ==
District	Incumbent			This race	
District	Member	Party	First elected	Results	Candidates
Iowa 1	Edward C. Eicher	Democratic	1932	Incumbent re-elected.	▌ ✓ Edward C. Eicher (Democratic) 51.0%; ▌John N. Calhoun (Republican) 49.0%
Iowa 2	Bernhard M. Jacobsen	Democratic	1930	Incumbent died. Democratic hold.	▌ ✓ William S. Jacobsen (Democratic) 52.8%; ▌Charles Penningroth (Republican) 41.1%; ▌George Koob (Union) 3.3%; ▌Archie Carter (Farmer–Labor) 2.8%
Iowa 3	John W. Gwynne	Republican	1934	Incumbent re-elected.	▌ ✓ John W. Gwynne (Republican) 51.9%; ▌Albert C. Willford (Democratic) 45.6%; ▌Lloyd R. Smith (Union) 2.4%
Iowa 4	Fred Biermann	Democratic	1932	Incumbent re-elected.	▌ ✓ Fred Biermann (Democratic) 50.6%; ▌H. O. Talle (Republican) 46.5%; ▌Wilbur L. Peck (Farmer–Labor) 2.9%
Iowa 5	Lloyd Thurston	Republican	1924	Incumbent re-elected.	▌ ✓ Lloyd Thurston (Republican) 51.1%; ▌Kenneth F. Baldridge (Democratic) 48.0%; ▌Andy Swanson (Farmer–Labor) 0.8%; ▌Lloyd Sprinkel (Socialist) 0.08%
Iowa 6	Hubert Utterback	Democratic	1934	Incumbent retired to run for U.S. senator. Republican gain.	▌ ✓ Cassius C. Dowell (Republican) 52.3%; ▌Harry B. Dunlap (Democratic) 46.5%; ▌Charles Gay (Farmer–Labor) 1.1%; ▌Herman G. Altenberger (Socialist) 0.1%
Iowa 7	Otha Wearin	Democratic	1932	Incumbent re-elected.	▌ ✓ Otha Wearin (Democratic) 50.4%; ▌Henry K. Peterson (Republican) 49.2%; ▌Isabel Jorgenson (Farmer–Labor) 0.4%
Iowa 8	Fred C. Gilchrist	Republican	1930	Incumbent re-elected.	▌ ✓ Fred C. Gilchrist (Republican) 52.5%; ▌Ray Murray (Democratic) 45.3%; ▌Matilda Sorenson Clark (Farmer–Labor) 2.3%
Iowa 9	Guy Gillette	Democratic	1932	Incumbent retired to run for U.S. senator. Democratic hold.	▌ ✓ Vincent F. Harrington (Democratic) 52.6%; ▌Fred B. Wolf (Republican) 44.1%; ▌G. L. Harrison (Farmer–Labor) 1.6%; ▌Leon Hilton (Union) 1.1%; ▌William Daniels (Union) 0.6%

== Kansas ==
District	Incumbent			This race	
District	Member	Party	First elected	Results	Candidates
Kansas 1	William P. Lambertson	Republican	1928	Incumbent re-elected.	▌ ✓ William P. Lambertson (Republican) 58.3%; ▌Howard S. Miller (Democratic) 41.7%
Kansas 2	Ulysses Samuel Guyer	Republican	1926	Incumbent re-elected.	▌ ✓ Ulysses Samuel Guyer (Republican) 53.3%; ▌David C. Doten (Democratic) 44.5%; ▌Glenn A. Steven (Independent) 2.2%
Kansas 3	Edward White Patterson	Democratic	1934	Incumbent re-elected.	▌ ✓ Edward White Patterson (Democratic) 48.4%; ▌Harold C. McGugin (Republican) 45.5%; ▌L. P. Beard (Independent) 6.0%
Kansas 4	Randolph Carpenter	Democratic	1932	Incumbent retired. Republican gain.	▌ ✓ Edward Herbert Rees (Republican) 54.5%; ▌C. D. Hill (Democratic) 45.1%; ▌A. D. Wiseman (Independent) 0.5%
Kansas 5	John Mills Houston	Democratic	1934	Incumbent re-elected.	▌ ✓ John Mills Houston (Democratic) 60.0%; ▌J. B. Patterson (Republican) 40.0%
Kansas 6	Frank Carlson	Republican	1934	Incumbent re-elected.	▌ ✓ Frank Carlson (Republican) 52.0%; ▌Arthur Connelly (Democratic) 48.0%
Kansas 7	Clifford R. Hope	Republican	1926	Incumbent re-elected.	▌ ✓ Clifford R. Hope (Republican) 56.0%; ▌Thomas A. Ralston (Democratic) 44.0%

== Kentucky ==
District	Incumbent			This race	
District	Member	Party	First elected	Results	Candidates
Kentucky 1	W. Voris Gregory	Democratic	1926	Incumbent died. Democratic hold.	▌ ✓ Noble J. Gregory (Democratic) 71.9%; ▌Robert N. Brumfield (Republican) 28.1%
Kentucky 2	Glover H. Cary	Democratic	1930	Incumbent re-elected.	▌ ✓ Glover H. Cary (Democratic) 64.0%; ▌Claude E. Smith (Republican) 36.0%
Kentucky 3	Emmet O'Neal	Democratic	1934	Incumbent re-elected.	▌ ✓ Emmet O'Neal (Democratic) 60.3%; ▌W. A. Armstrong (Republican) 37.3%; ▌Jerry V. Spencer (Union) 2.3%; ▌Sara Kasdan (Socialist) 0.1%
Kentucky 4	Edward W. Creal	Democratic	1935 (special)	Incumbent re-elected.	▌ ✓ Edward W. Creal (Democratic) 59.0%; ▌Stanley Jaggers (Republican) 41.0%
Kentucky 5	Brent Spence	Democratic	1930	Incumbent re-elected.	▌ ✓ Brent Spence (Democratic) 66.7%; ▌Ervin L. Bramlage (Republican) 28.8%; ▌Katherine J. Madden (Union) 4.5%
Kentucky 6	Virgil Chapman	Democratic	1930	Incumbent re-elected.	▌ ✓ Virgil Chapman (Democratic) 57.9%; ▌A. R. Anderson (Republican) 40.3%; ▌Claude B. Robinson (Independent) 1.8%
Kentucky 7	Andrew J. May	Democratic	1930	Incumbent re-elected.	▌ ✓ Andrew J. May (Democratic) 55.9%; ▌John B. Mollette (Republican) 44.1%
Kentucky 8	Fred M. Vinson	Democratic	1930	Incumbent re-elected.	▌ ✓ Fred M. Vinson (Democratic) 58.7%; ▌W. Hoffman Wood (Republican) 41.3%
Kentucky 9	John M. Robsion	Republican	1934	Incumbent re-elected.	▌ ✓ John M. Robsion (Republican) 61.6%; ▌George L. Tye (Democratic) 38.4%

== Louisiana ==
District	Incumbent			This race	
District	Member	Party	First elected	Results	Candidates
Louisiana 1	Joachim O. Fernández	Democratic	1930	Incumbent re-elected.	▌ ✓ Joachim O. Fernández (Democratic); Uncontested
Louisiana 2	Paul H. Maloney	Democratic	1930	Incumbent re-elected.	▌ ✓ Paul H. Maloney (Democratic); Uncontested
Louisiana 3	Numa F. Montet	Democratic	1929 (special)	Incumbent lost renomination. Democratic hold.	▌ ✓ Robert L. Mouton (Democratic); Uncontested
Louisiana 4	John N. Sandlin	Democratic	1920	Incumbent retired to run for U.S. senator. Democratic hold.	▌ ✓ Overton Brooks (Democratic); Uncontested
Louisiana 5	Riley J. Wilson	Democratic	1914	Incumbent lost renomination. Democratic hold.	▌ ✓ Newt V. Mills (Democratic); Uncontested
Louisiana 6	Jared Y. Sanders Jr.	Democratic	1934	Incumbent lost renomination. Democratic hold.	▌ ✓ John K. Griffith (Democratic); Uncontested
Louisiana 7	René L. De Rouen	Democratic	1927 (special)	Incumbent re-elected.	▌ ✓ René L. De Rouen (Democratic); Uncontested
Louisiana 8	Cleveland Dear	Democratic	1932	Incumbent retired to run for Governor of Louisiana. Democratic hold.	▌ ✓ A. Leonard Allen (Democratic); Uncontested

== Maine ==
District	Incumbent			This race	
District	Member	Party	First elected	Results	Candidates
Maine 1	Simon M. Hamlin	Democratic	1934	Incumbent lost re-election. Republican gain.	▌ ✓ James C. Oliver (Republican) 57.9%; ▌Simon M. Hamlin (Democratic) 42.1%
Maine 2	Edward C. Moran Jr.	Democratic	1932	Incumbent retired. Republican gain.	▌ ✓ Clyde H. Smith (Republican) 51.6%; ▌Ernest L. McLean (Democratic) 37.4%; ▌J. Clarence Leckemby (Independent) 7.9%; ▌A. Raymond Rogers (Union) 3.1%
Maine 3	Owen Brewster	Republican	1934	Incumbent re-elected.	▌ ✓ Owen Brewster (Republican) 60.8%; ▌Wallace F. Mabee (Democratic) 39.2%

== Maryland ==
District	Incumbent			This race	
District	Member	Party	First elected	Results	Candidates
Maryland 1	T. Alan Goldsborough	Democratic	1920	Incumbent re-elected.	▌ ✓ T. Alan Goldsborough (Democratic) 60.0%; ▌O. Straughn Lloyd (Republican) 40.0%
Maryland 2	William P. Cole Jr.	Democratic	1930	Incumbent re-elected.	▌ ✓ William P. Cole Jr. (Democratic) 61.7%; ▌Henry C. Whiteford (Republican) 37.6%; ▌Oswald S. Hunt (Socialist) 0.8%
Maryland 3	Vincent L. Palmisano	Democratic	1926	Incumbent re-elected.	▌ ✓ Vincent L. Palmisano (Democratic) 60.5%; ▌John Philip Hill (Republican) 38.7%; ▌Samuel M. Neistadt (Socialist) 0.8%
Maryland 4	Ambrose Jerome Kennedy	Democratic	1932	Incumbent re-elected.	▌ ✓ Ambrose Jerome Kennedy (Democratic) 51.5%; ▌Daniel Ellison (Republican) 44.3%; ▌Ross Thalheimer (Independent) 3.5%; ▌Elisabeth Gilman (Socialist) 0.7%
Maryland 5	Stephen W. Gambrill	Democratic	1924	Incumbent re-elected.	▌ ✓ Stephen W. Gambrill (Democratic) 64.7%; ▌Roscoe C. Rowe (Republican) 34.4%; ▌Samuel R. Angel (Socialist) 0.9%
Maryland 6	David J. Lewis	Democratic	1930	Incumbent re-elected.	▌ ✓ David J. Lewis (Democratic) 56.4%; ▌Harry W. Le Gore (Republican) 43.0%; ▌Merl Claude Boyer (Socialist) 0.6%

== Massachusetts ==
District	Incumbent			This race	
District	Member	Party	First elected	Results	Candidates
Massachusetts 1	Allen T. Treadway	Republican	1912	Incumbent re-elected.	▌ ✓ Allen T. Treadway (Republican) 50.1%; ▌Owen Johnson (Democratic) 44.5%; ▌Milton F. Hadley (Social Justice) 4.7%; ▌Charles H. Daniels (Socialist) 0.8%
Massachusetts 2	William J. Granfield	Democratic	1930	Incumbent retired. Republican gain.	▌ ✓ Charles R. Clason (Republican) 49.0%; ▌Agnes C. Reavey (Democratic) 44.3%; ▌Harry A. Custis (Independent) 3.4%; ▌S. Ralph Harlow (Socialist) 1.9%; ▌Donald F. Moynahan (Social Justice) 1.4%
Massachusetts 3	Joseph E. Casey	Democratic	1934	Incumbent re-elected.	▌ ✓ Joseph E. Casey (Democratic) 54.1%; ▌Bernard W. Doyle (Republican) 45.1%
Massachusetts 4	Pehr G. Holmes	Republican	1930	Incumbent re-elected.	▌ ✓ Pehr G. Holmes (Republican) 51.5%; ▌Edward A. Ryan (Democratic) 47.4%; ▌William A. Ahern (Socialist) 1.1%
Massachusetts 5	Edith Nourse Rogers	Republican	1925 (special)	Incumbent re-elected.	▌ ✓ Edith Nourse Rogers (Republican) 62.8%; ▌Daniel J. Coughlin (Democratic) 33.7%; Others 2.1%; ▌John T. Kevin Jr. (Independent) 1.5%
Massachusetts 6	A. Piatt Andrew	Republican	1921 (special)	Incumbent died. Republican hold.	▌ ✓ George J. Bates (Republican) 68.6%; ▌John E. Taffe (Democratic) 31.4%
Massachusetts 7	William P. Connery Jr.	Democratic	1922	Incumbent re-elected.	▌ ✓ William P. Connery Jr. (Democratic) 59.0%; ▌C. F. Nelson Pratt (Republican) 39.4%; ▌Joseph F. Massidda (Socialist) 1.1%; ▌F. Austin Benson (Communist) 0.5%
Massachusetts 8	Arthur D. Healey	Democratic	1932	Incumbent re-elected.	▌ ✓ Arthur D. Healey (Democratic) 52.5%; ▌William S. Howe (Republican) 40.5%; ▌Nelson F. Wright (Union) 5.2%; ▌William Kennedy Mason (Social Justice) 1.7%
Massachusetts 9	Richard M. Russell	Democratic	1934	Incumbent lost re-election. Republican gain.	▌ ✓ Robert Luce (Republican) 50.6%; ▌Richard M. Russell (Democratic) 44.0%; ▌C. Ernest Curtis (Townsend) 3.6%; ▌Florence Luscomb (Peoples' Labor) 1.7%
Massachusetts 10	George H. Tinkham	Republican	1914	Incumbent re-elected.	▌ ✓ George H. Tinkham (Republican) 59.5%; ▌William F. Madden (Democratic) 31.4%; ▌John McLaren (Townsend) 9.1%
Massachusetts 11	John Patrick Higgins	Democratic	1934	Incumbent re-elected.	▌ ✓ John Patrick Higgins (Democratic) 81.3%; ▌Joseph M. De Napoli (Republican) 13.0%; ▌John R. Hughes (Independent) 4.5%; ▌Aniello D. Imperato (Independent) 1.1%
Massachusetts 12	John W. McCormack	Democratic	1928	Incumbent re-elected.	▌ ✓ John W. McCormack (Democratic) 68.7%; ▌Albert P. McCulloch (Republican) 31.3%
Massachusetts 13	Richard B. Wigglesworth	Republican	1928	Incumbent re-elected.	▌ ✓ Richard B. Wigglesworth (Republican) 58.5%; ▌Harry J. Dowd (Democratic) 41.5%
Massachusetts 14	Joseph W. Martin Jr.	Republican	1924	Incumbent re-elected.	▌ ✓ Joseph W. Martin Jr. (Republican) 53.3%; ▌Arthur E. Seagrave (Democratic) 35.0%; ▌Lawrence O. Witter (Union) 11.7%
Massachusetts 15	Charles L. Gifford	Republican	1922	Incumbent re-elected.	▌ ✓ Charles L. Gifford (Republican) 50.1%; ▌John D. W. Bodfish (Democratic) 36.5%; ▌John Henry McNeece (Social Justice) 10.7%; ▌William McAuliffe (Union) 1.9%; ▌Nora Ouimette Duprey (Socialist) 0.9%

== Michigan ==
District	Incumbent			This race	
District	Member	Party	First elected	Results	Candidates
Michigan 1	George G. Sadowski	Democratic	1932	Incumbent re-elected.	▌ ✓ George G. Sadowski (Democratic) 80.8%; ▌Charles A. Roxborough (Republican) 19.2%
Michigan 2	Earl C. Michener	Republican	1934	Incumbent re-elected.	▌ ✓ Earl C. Michener (Republican) 51.7%; ▌Charles E. Downing (Democratic) 48.3%
Michigan 3	Verner Main	Republican	1935 (special)	Incumbent lost renomination. Republican hold.	▌ ✓ Paul W. Shafer (Republican) 51.8%; ▌Rosslyn L. Sowers (Democratic) 48.2%; ▌Arthur J. Wobler (Socialist Labor) 0.04%
Michigan 4	Clare Hoffman	Republican	1934	Incumbent re-elected.	▌ ✓ Clare Hoffman (Republican) 50.5%; ▌Guy M. Tyler (Democratic) 45.1%; ▌Felix Racotte (Write-in) 4.2%; ▌Robert Disbrow (Socialist) 0.2%
Michigan 5	Carl E. Mapes	Republican	1912	Incumbent re-elected.	▌ ✓ Carl E. Mapes (Republican) 48.3%; ▌Thomas F. McAllister (Democratic) 47.4%; ▌George Veldman (Union) 3.9%; ▌Floyd L. Yeomans (Socialist) 0.4%
Michigan 6	William W. Blackney	Republican	1934	Incumbent lost re-election. Democratic gain.	▌ ✓ Andrew J. Transue (Democratic) 57.7%; ▌William W. Blackney (Republican) 42.3%
Michigan 7	Jesse P. Wolcott	Republican	1930	Incumbent re-elected.	▌ ✓ Jesse P. Wolcott (Republican) 59.9%; ▌Albert A. Wagner (Democratic) 39.9%; ▌E. L. Card (Socialist) 0.2%; ▌Charles F. Mann (American) 0.01%
Michigan 8	Fred L. Crawford	Republican	1934	Incumbent re-elected.	▌ ✓ Fred L. Crawford (Republican) 46.8%; ▌Michael J. Hart (Democratic) 45.7%; ▌Clarence J. Brainerd (Union) 7.5%
Michigan 9	Albert J. Engel	Republican	1934	Incumbent re-elected.	▌ ✓ Albert J. Engel (Republican) 50.2%; ▌Jack Eliasohn (Democratic) 49.4%; ▌Eugene L. Howard (Farmer–Labor) 0.4%
Michigan 10	Roy O. Woodruff	Republican	1920	Incumbent re-elected.	▌ ✓ Roy O. Woodruff (Republican) 57.6%; ▌William J. Kelly (Democratic) 42.3%; ▌William Rabideau (Socialist) 0.1%
Michigan 11	Prentiss M. Brown	Democratic	1932	Incumbent retired to run for U.S. senator. Democratic hold.	▌ ✓ John F. Luecke (Democratic) 52.8%; ▌Herbert J. Rushton (Republican) 46.9%; ▌Frank Huff (Socialist) 0.3%
Michigan 12	Frank Eugene Hook	Democratic	1934	Incumbent re-elected.	▌ ✓ Frank Eugene Hook (Democratic) 54.7%; ▌W. Frank James (Republican) 44.6%; ▌Raymond E. Garvey (Farmer–Labor) 0.7%
Michigan 13	Clarence J. McLeod	Republican	1922	Incumbent lost re-election. Democratic gain.	▌ ✓ George D. O'Brien (Democratic) 55.6%; ▌Clarence J. McLeod (Republican) 43.7%; ▌?? (Socialist) 0.5%; ▌Maurice Sugar (Farmer–Labor) 0.1%; ▌?? (Socialist Labor) 0.09%
Michigan 14	Louis C. Rabaut	Democratic	1934	Incumbent re-elected.	▌ ✓ Louis C. Rabaut (Democratic) 55.9%; ▌Frederick M. Alger Jr. (Republican) 34.4%; ▌Edgar J. Auclair (Union) 8.9%; ▌?? (Socialist) 0.4%; ▌Fred Van de Putte (Farmer–Labor) 0.3%
Michigan 15	John Dingell Sr.	Democratic	1932	Incumbent re-elected.	▌ ✓ John Dingell Sr. (Democratic) 57.5%; ▌Nathaniel H. Goldstick (Republican) 41.6%; ▌Francis King (Socialist) 0.5%; ▌William McKie (Farmer–Labor) 0.3%; ▌Charles Aronoff (Socialist Labor) 0.05%; ▌James M. Ball (United) 0.01%
Michigan 16	John Lesinski Sr.	Democratic	1932	Incumbent re-elected.	▌ ✓ John Lesinski Sr. (Democratic) 58.2%; ▌Clyde M. Ford (Republican) 36.2%; ▌Ralph B. Guy Sr. (Union) 4.7%; ▌?? (Socialist) 0.4%; ▌Charles A. Regan (Farmer–Labor) 0.4%; ▌?? (Socialist Labor) 0.09%; ▌John S. Sweet (American) 0.006%
Michigan 17	George A. Dondero	Republican	1932	Incumbent re-elected.	▌ ✓ George A. Dondero (Republican) 47.7%; ▌Draper Allen (Democratic) 46.6%; ▌Maynard Seibert (Union) 5.2%; ▌W. H. Allmendiger (Socialist) 0.4%; ▌Harry E. Irwin (Farmer–Labor) 0.2%; ▌Thomas F. Slater (Socialist Labor) 0.07%; ▌Leslie Buck (American) 0.005%

== Minnesota ==
Minnesota's Results

District	Incumbent			This race	
District	Member	Party	First elected	Results	Candidates
Minnesota 1	August H. Andresen	Republican	1934	Incumbent re-elected.	▌ ✓ August H. Andresen (Republican) 50.7%; ▌Chester Watson (Farmer–Labor) 23.1%; ▌Richard W. Morin (Democratic) 21.7%; ▌D. M. Quarles (Independent) 4.5%
Minnesota 2	Elmer Ryan	Democratic	1934	Incumbent re-elected.	▌ ✓ Elmer Ryan (Democratic) 39.2%; ▌Henry M. Arens (Farmer–Labor) 32.5%; ▌Christian J. Laurisch (Republican) 28.2%
Minnesota 3	Ernest Lundeen	Farmer–Labor	1932	Incumbent retired to run for U.S. senator. Farmer–Labor hold.	▌ ✓ Henry Teigan (Farmer–Labor) 46.3%; ▌Milton Lindbloom (Republican) 32.5%; ▌Martin A. Hogan (Democratic) 12.1%; ▌Mrs. Frank McConville (Independent) 9.1%
Minnesota 4	Melvin Maas	Republican	1934	Incumbent re-elected.	▌ ✓ Melvin Maas (Republican) 38.3%; ▌Howard Y. Williams (Farmer–Labor) 38.0%; ▌A. B. C. Doherty (Democratic) 22.9%; ▌Otis A. Luce (Independent) 0.7%
Minnesota 5	Theodore Christianson	Republican	1934	Incumbent retired to run for U.S. senator. Farmer–Labor gain.	▌ ✓ Dewey Johnson (Farmer–Labor) 47.8%; ▌Walter Newton (Republican) 41.3%; ▌M. J. Dillon (Democratic) 10.9%
Minnesota 6	Harold Knutson	Republican	1934	Incumbent re-elected.	▌ ✓ Harold Knutson (Republican) 46.1%; ▌C. A. Ryan (Farmer–Labor) 39.6%; ▌Joseph H. Kowalkowski (Democratic) 14.3%
Minnesota 7	Paul John Kvale	Farmer–Labor	1929 (special)	Incumbent re-elected.	▌ ✓ Paul John Kvale (Farmer–Labor) 49.7%; ▌H. Carl Anderson (Republican) 32.8%; ▌C. L. Cole (Democratic) 17.5%
Minnesota 8	William Alvin Pittenger	Republican	1934	Incumbent lost re-election. Farmer–Labor gain.	▌ ✓ John Bernard (Farmer–Labor) 56.4%; ▌William Alvin Pittenger (Republican) 43.6%
Minnesota 9	Rich T. Buckler	Farmer–Labor	1934	Incumbent re-elected.	▌ ✓ Rich T. Buckler (Farmer–Labor) 48.4%; ▌Elmer A. Haugen (Republican) 31.3%; ▌Martin O. Brandon (Democratic) 20.2%

== Mississippi ==
District	Incumbent			This race	
District	Member	Party	First elected	Results	Candidates
Mississippi 1	John E. Rankin	Democratic	1920	Incumbent re-elected.	▌ ✓ John E. Rankin (Democratic) 98.0%; ▌E. A. Williams (Republican) 2.0%; ▌G. W. Strickland (Democratic) 0.01%
Mississippi 2	Wall Doxey	Democratic	1928	Incumbent re-elected.	▌ ✓ Wall Doxey (Democratic) 98.9%; ▌W. M. McDonough (Republican) 1.1%
Mississippi 3	William Madison Whittington	Democratic	1924	Incumbent re-elected.	▌ ✓ William Madison Whittington (Democratic) 97.5%; ▌W. W. Gilbert (Republican) 2.5%
Mississippi 4	Aaron L. Ford	Democratic	1934	Incumbent re-elected.	▌ ✓ Aaron L. Ford (Democratic) 100.0%; ▌N. B. Woods (Republican) 0.01%
Mississippi 5	Aubert C. Dunn	Democratic	1934	Incumbent retired. Democratic hold.	▌ ✓ Ross A. Collins (Democratic) 99.4%; ▌D. V. Johnson (Republican) 0.6%
Mississippi 6	William M. Colmer	Democratic	1932	Incumbent re-elected.	▌ ✓ William M. Colmer (Democratic); Uncontested
Mississippi 7	Dan R. McGehee	Democratic	1934	Incumbent re-elected.	▌ ✓ Dan R. McGehee (Democratic) 97.5%; ▌L. R. Collins (Republican) 2.5%

== Missouri ==
Missouri's results

District	Incumbent			This race	
District	Member	Party	First elected	Results	Candidates
Missouri 1	Milton A. Romjue	Democratic	1922	Incumbent re-elected.	▌ ✓ Milton A. Romjue (Democratic) 55.4%; ▌James Grover Morgan (Republican) 44.5%; ▌Morrison (Socialist) 0.10%
Missouri 2	William L. Nelson	Democratic	1934	Incumbent re-elected.	▌ ✓ William L. Nelson (Democratic) 58.1%; ▌O. B. Whitaker (Republican) 41.9%; ▌Ousley (Socialist) 0.05%
Missouri 3	Richard M. Duncan	Democratic	1932	Incumbent re-elected.	▌ ✓ Richard M. Duncan (Democratic) 58.8%; ▌Miles Elliott (Republican) 41.2%
Missouri 4	C. Jasper Bell	Democratic	1934	Incumbent re-elected.	▌ ✓ C. Jasper Bell (Democratic) 74.6%; ▌Paul R. Byrum (Republican) 25.3%; ▌Leppert (Socialist) 0.04%; ▌Henke (Socialist Labor) 0.01%
Missouri 5	Joe Shannon	Democratic	1930	Incumbent re-elected.	▌ ✓ Joe Shannon (Democratic) 73.7%; ▌Lowell R. Johnson (Republican) 26.2%; ▌Hodges (Socialist) 0.04%; ▌Hiltner (Socialist Labor) 0.009%
Missouri 6	Reuben T. Wood	Democratic	1932	Incumbent re-elected.	▌ ✓ Reuben T. Wood (Democratic) 53.0%; ▌Thomas H. Douglas (Republican) 46.9%; ▌Langley (Socialist Labor) 0.10%
Missouri 7	Dewey Short	Republican	1934	Incumbent re-elected.	▌ ✓ Dewey Short (Republican) 52.5%; ▌Gene Frost (Democratic) 47.4%; ▌High (Socialist) 0.1%; ▌Cady (Prohibition) 0.08%
Missouri 8	Clyde Williams	Democratic	1930	Incumbent re-elected.	▌ ✓ Clyde Williams (Democratic) 56.6%; ▌C. M. Becker (Republican) 43.2%; ▌Clemons (Socialist) 0.1%
Missouri 9	Clarence Cannon	Democratic	1922	Incumbent re-elected.	▌ ✓ Clarence Cannon (Democratic) 61.8%; ▌Herschel Schooley (Republican) 38.2%; ▌Shumaker (Socialist) 0.07%
Missouri 10	Orville Zimmerman	Democratic	1934	Incumbent re-elected.	▌ ✓ Orville Zimmerman (Democratic) 61.4%; ▌Linder Deimund (Republican) 38.5%; ▌Jones (Socialist) 0.07%
Missouri 11	Thomas C. Hennings Jr.	Democratic	1934	Incumbent re-elected.	▌ ✓ Thomas C. Hennings Jr. (Democratic) 61.1%; ▌Leonidas C. Dyer (Republican) 38.6%; ▌Preisler (Socialist) 0.3%; ▌Anastasoff (Socialist Labor) 0.04%
Missouri 12	James Robert Claiborne	Democratic	1932	Incumbent lost renomination. Democratic hold.	▌ ✓ Charles Arthur Anderson (Democratic) 56.2%; ▌Harry P. Rosecan (Republican) 43.5%; ▌Hill (Socialist) 0.3%; ▌Genck (Socialist Labor) 0.02%
Missouri 13	John J. Cochran	Democratic	1926	Incumbent re-elected.	▌ ✓ John J. Cochran (Democratic) 68.2%; ▌Harry E. Wiehe (Republican) 31.6%; ▌Holden (Socialist) 0.2%; ▌Kochendorfer (Socialist Labor) 0.01%

== Montana ==
District	Incumbent			This race	
District	Member	Party	First elected	Results	Candidates
Montana 1	Joseph P. Monaghan	Democratic	1932	Incumbent retired to run for U.S. senator. Democratic hold.	▌ ✓ Jerry J. O'Connell (Democratic) 63.4%; ▌H. L. Hart (Republican) 36.1%; ▌H. C. Schneider (Socialist) 0.5%
Montana 2	Roy E. Ayers	Democratic	1932	Incumbent retired to run for Governor of Montana. Democratic hold.	▌ ✓ James F. O'Connor (Democratic) 64.9%; ▌T. S. Stockdal (Republican) 34.8%; ▌Bert Chesner (Socialist) 0.3%

== Nebraska ==
Nebraska's results

District	Incumbent			This race	
District	Member	Party	First elected	Results	Candidates
Nebraska 1	Henry C. Luckey	Democratic	1934	Incumbent re-elected.	▌ ✓ Henry C. Luckey (Democratic) 53.3%; ▌Ernest B. Perry (Republican) 45.5%; ▌Isaac B. Flint (Independent) 1.2%
Nebraska 2	Charles F. McLaughlin	Democratic	1934	Incumbent re-elected.	▌ ✓ Charles F. McLaughlin (Democratic) 62.0%; ▌Jackson B. Chase (Republican) 35.7%; ▌Henry Hoffman (Independent) 1.5%; ▌U. S. Renne (Independent) 0.7%
Nebraska 3	Karl Stefan	Republican	1934	Incumbent re-elected.	▌ ✓ Karl Stefan (Republican) 70.5%; ▌John Havekost (Democratic) 27.0%; ▌Raymond W. McNamara (Union) 2.6%
Nebraska 4	Charles Binderup	Democratic	1934	Incumbent re-elected.	▌ ✓ Charles Binderup (Democratic) 55.3%; ▌Arthur J. Denney (Republican) 42.7%; ▌Bert W. Harris (Independent) 2.0%
Nebraska 5	Harry B. Coffee	Democratic	1934	Incumbent re-elected.	▌ ✓ Harry B. Coffee (Democratic) 58.3%; ▌Cullen N. Wright (Republican) 33.8%; ▌Frank Brown (Union) 7.4%; ▌Austin E. Jay (Independent) 0.6%

== Nevada ==
District	Incumbent			This race	
District	Member	Party	First elected	Results	Candidates
Nevada at-large	James G. Scrugham	Democratic	1932	Incumbent re-elected.	▌ ✓ James G. Scrugham (Democratic) 58.4%; ▌Ed C. Peterson (Republican) 26.8%; ▌Harry H. Austin (Independent) 14.7%

== New Hampshire ==
In the 1st district, Republican Arthur B. Jenks was initially declared the winner, and sat in the House from January 1937 to June 1938, but Democrat Alphonse Roy successfully contested the election and served the remainder of the term before losing the 1938 election to Jenks.

District	Incumbent			This race	
District	Member	Party	First elected	Results	Candidates
New Hampshire 1	William N. Rogers	Democratic	1932	Incumbent retired to run for U.S. senator. Democratic hold.	▌ ✓ Alphonse Roy (Democratic) 49.5%; ▌Arthur B. Jenks (Republican) 49.5%; ▌Alice G. Flynn (Independent) 0.7%; ▌Anna C. Rudd (Farmer–Labor) 0.2%
New Hampshire 2	Charles W. Tobey	Republican	1932	Incumbent re-elected.	▌ ✓ Charles W. Tobey (Republican) 53.6%; ▌Daniel J. Hagerty (Democratic) 45.5%; ▌John C. Spinney (Farmer–Labor) 0.9%

== New Jersey ==
District	Incumbent			This race	
District	Member	Party	First elected	Results	Candidates
New Jersey 1	Charles A. Wolverton	Republican	1926	Incumbent re-elected.	▌ ✓ Charles A. Wolverton (Republican) 51.8%; ▌Guy Lee Jr. (Democratic) 46.1%; ▌David E. Fox (Townsend) 1.6%; ▌Samuel Josephson (Socialist) 0.3%; ▌Charles S. Danenhower (Communist) 0.07%
New Jersey 2	Isaac Bacharach	Republican	1914	Incumbent lost re-election. Democratic gain.	▌ ✓ Elmer H. Wene (Democratic) 50.0%; ▌Isaac Bacharach (Republican) 45.8%; ▌Ted Lenore (Townsend) 2.9%; ▌U. G. Robinson (Prop. Home Protection) 1.1%; ▌Franklin L. Watkins (Socialist) 0.09%; ▌Frank A. Yacovelli (Townsend) 0.08%; ▌Thomas F. Ogilvie (End Poverty) 0.02%
New Jersey 3	William H. Sutphin	Democratic	1930	Incumbent re-elected.	▌ ✓ William H. Sutphin (Democratic) 50.6%; ▌Albert B. Hermann (Republican) 47.7%; ▌Elizabeth Halleck (Townsend) 1.6%; ▌Willie Lee Johnson (Communist) 0.10%
New Jersey 4	D. Lane Powers	Republican	1932	Incumbent re-elected.	▌ ✓ D. Lane Powers (Republican) 52.3%; ▌Joseph A. Daly (Democratic) 47.4%; ▌William C. Kauffman (Farmer–Labor) 0.3%; ▌William T. Love (Peoples) 0.06%
New Jersey 5	Charles A. Eaton	Republican	1924	Incumbent re-elected.	▌ ✓ Charles A. Eaton (Republican) 50.9%; ▌Charles S. MacKenzie (Democratic) 48.9%; ▌Bordeaux W. Stokes (Socialist) 0.2%; ▌James L. Creekmur (Communist) 0.07%
New Jersey 6	Donald H. McLean	Republican	1932	Incumbent re-elected.	▌ ✓ Donald H. McLean (Republican) 50.2%; ▌Frank Moore (Democratic) 49.3%; ▌Edward H. Taylor (Socialist) 0.2%; ▌Herman Grieshaber (Townsend) 0.1%; ▌Renious Edwards (Communist) 0.1%
New Jersey 7	Randolph Perkins	Republican	1920	Incumbent died. Republican hold.	▌ ✓ J. Parnell Thomas (Republican) 51.6%; ▌H. P. J. Hoffmann (Democratic) 48.2%; ▌Henry Jager (Communist) 0.2%
New Jersey 8	George N. Seger	Republican	1922	Incumbent re-elected.	▌ ✓ George N. Seger (Republican) 50.8%; ▌Leo V. Becker (Democratic) 46.1%; ▌William J. Vanderbeck (Townsend) 2.6%; ▌Garrett De Young (Socialist) 0.3%; ▌David Reiss (Communist) 0.2%; ▌John C. Butterworth (Socialist Labor) 0.1%; ▌Ernest E. Clock (Prohibition) 0.03%
New Jersey 9	Edward A. Kenney	Democratic	1932	Incumbent re-elected.	▌ ✓ Edward A. Kenney (Democratic) 53.9%; ▌Lawrence A. Cavinato (Republican) 45.7%; ▌Henry J. Cox (Socialist) 0.3%; ▌John Leahy (Socialist Labor) 0.06%
New Jersey 10	Fred A. Hartley Jr.	Republican	1928	Incumbent re-elected.	▌ ✓ Fred A. Hartley Jr. (Republican) 50.2%; ▌Lindsay H. Rudd (Democratic) 49.6%; ▌Eric Ross (Socialist) 0.2%; ▌Frank Chandler (Communist) 0.06%
New Jersey 11	Peter Angelo Cavicchia	Republican	1930	Incumbent lost re-election. Democratic gain.	▌ ✓ Edward L. O'Neill (Democratic) 52.6%; ▌Peter Angelo Cavicchia (Republican) 47.1%; ▌Julius Ferster (Socialist) 0.1%; ▌William H. Marron (Communist) 0.1%; ▌John Cranston (Socialist Labor) 0.02%
New Jersey 12	Frederick R. Lehlbach	Republican	1914	Incumbent lost re-election. Democratic gain.	▌ ✓ Frank William Towey Jr. (Democratic) 49.9%; ▌Frederick R. Lehlbach (Republican) 49.6%; ▌Harry Lichtman (Socialist) 0.3%; ▌Kurt Odenheim (Communist) 0.2%
New Jersey 13	Mary Teresa Norton	Democratic	1924	Incumbent re-elected.	▌ ✓ Mary Teresa Norton (Democratic) 75.8%; ▌John J. Grossi (Republican) 22.3%; ▌Charles V. McCarthy (Social Justice) 1.7%; ▌Jacob Neiburg (Socialist) 0.05%; ▌Milton Rosenzweig (Communist) 0.04%; ▌Warren Taylor (Social Justice) 0.03%; ▌Louis Slootsky (Social Justice) 0.03%
New Jersey 14	Edward J. Hart	Democratic	1934	Incumbent re-elected.	▌ ✓ Edward J. Hart (Democratic) 79.3%; ▌Fred G. Tauber (Republican) 19.8%; ▌Thomas R. Berry (Social Justice) 0.6%; ▌John Palangio (Socialist) 0.3%; ▌William E. Greenleaf (Labor) 0.06%

== New Mexico ==
District	Incumbent			This race	
District	Member	Party	First elected	Results	Candidates
New Mexico at-large	John J. Dempsey	Democratic	1934	Incumbent re-elected.	▌ ✓ John J. Dempsey (Democratic) 62.9%; ▌M. Ralph Brown (Republican) 37.0%; ▌Albert Ortiz (Farmer–Labor) 0.04%

== New York ==
District	Incumbent			This race	
District	Member	Party	First elected	Results	Candidates
New York 1	Robert L. Bacon	Republican	1922	Incumbent re-elected.	▌ ✓ Robert L. Bacon (Republican) 55.2%; ▌Gerald Morrell (Democratic) 42.9%; ▌Christine Schmidtchen (Socialist) 1.9%
New York 2	William Bernard Barry	Democratic	1935 (special)	Incumbent re-elected.	▌ ✓ William Bernard Barry (Democratic) 69.2%; ▌Allen E. R. Craig (Republican) 28.2%; ▌Sam DeWitt (Socialist) 1.8%; ▌Paul P. Crosbie (Communist) 0.9%
New York 3	Joseph L. Pfeifer	Democratic	1934	Incumbent re-elected.	▌ ✓ Joseph L. Pfeifer (Democratic) 80.3%; ▌Jerome G. Licari (Republican) 17.2%; ▌Ernest Mendez (Socialist) 1.3%; ▌Dominick Flaiani (Communist) 1.2%
New York 4	Thomas H. Cullen	Democratic	1918	Incumbent re-elected.	▌ ✓ Thomas H. Cullen (Democratic) 77.7%; ▌William G. Nolan (Republican) 20.5%; ▌David M. Cory (Socialist) 1.2%; ▌Charles Warren (Communist) 0.6%
New York 5	Marcellus H. Evans	Democratic	1934	Incumbent re-elected.	▌ ✓ Marcellus H. Evans (Democratic) 64.9%; ▌Frank A. Dalton (Republican) 31.6%; ▌Joseph G. Glass (Socialist) 2.1%; ▌Sadie Berg (Communist) 1.4%
New York 6	Andrew Lawrence Somers	Democratic	1924	Incumbent re-elected.	▌ ✓ Andrew Lawrence Somers (Democratic) 69.1%; ▌Donald C. Strachan (Republican) 24.0%; ▌Jacob Axelrod (Socialist) 3.5%; ▌Constance Jackson (Communist) 3.4%
New York 7	John J. Delaney	Democratic	1931 (special); 1918 (retired); 1931 (special)	Incumbent re-elected.	▌ ✓ John J. Delaney (Democratic) 75.5%; ▌Joseph M. Aimee (Republican) 19.8%; ▌Tom Malloy (Communist) 2.7%; ▌Sam Baron (Socialist) 2.0%
New York 8	Richard J. Tonry	Democratic	1934	Incumbent lost renomination. Democratic hold.	▌ ✓ Donald L. O'Toole (Democratic) 72.2%; ▌Nathan Greenbaum (Republican) 21.2%; ▌Isidore Begun (Communist) 3.8%; ▌Mary W. Hillyer (Socialist) 2.8%
New York 9	Stephen A. Rudd	Democratic	1931 (special)	Incumbent died. Democratic hold.	▌ ✓ Eugene James Keogh (Democratic) 65.6%; ▌Robert E. Hower (Republican) 30.4%; ▌Theodore Shapiro (Socialist) 2.4%; ▌Charles Oberkirsh (Communist) 1.6%
New York 10	Emanuel Celler	Democratic	1922	Incumbent re-elected.	▌ ✓ Emanuel Celler (Democratic) 68.8%; ▌Mortimer H. Michaels (Republican) 25.3%; ▌Joe Weiss (Communist) 3.2%; ▌Louis Sadoff (Socialist) 2.7%
New York 11	James A. O'Leary	Democratic	1934	Incumbent re-elected.	▌ ✓ James A. O'Leary (Democratic) 66.7%; ▌Archibald Cooper (Republican) 30.3%; ▌Zekor Antousen (Socialist) 1.8%; ▌Edward Crowley (Communist) 1.3%
New York 12	Samuel Dickstein	Democratic	1922	Incumbent re-elected.	▌ ✓ Samuel Dickstein (Democratic) 86.4%; ▌Joseph Levine (Republican) 9.6%; ▌Sadie Van Veen (Communist) 2.5%; ▌Edwin Koppel (Socialist) 1.5%
New York 13	Christopher D. Sullivan	Democratic	1916	Incumbent re-elected.	▌ ✓ Christopher D. Sullivan (Democratic) 79.7%; ▌Vincent A. Marsicano (Republican) 16.6%; ▌Joseph Magliacano (Communist) 2.3%; ▌David Lasser (Socialist) 1.4%
New York 14	William I. Sirovich	Democratic	1926	Incumbent re-elected.	▌ ✓ William I. Sirovich (Democratic) 61.5%; ▌Emanuel A. Manginelli (Republican) 31.4%; ▌Max Bedacht (Communist) 4.6%; ▌Bruno Fischer (Socialist) 2.5%
New York 15	John J. Boylan	Democratic	1922	Incumbent re-elected.	▌ ✓ John J. Boylan (Democratic) 77.5%; ▌Arthur Wyler (Republican) 19.0%; ▌Harold Hickerson (Communist) 2.0%; ▌Edward R. Hardy Jr. (Socialist) 1.5%
New York 16	John J. O'Connor	Democratic	1923 (special)	Incumbent re-elected.	▌ ✓ John J. O'Connor (Democratic) 60.0%; ▌J. Homer Cudmore (Republican) 32.3%; ▌John A. HaAstings (Independent) 3.3%; ▌Marthe Teichman (Communist) 2.5%; ▌Frank N. Tragger (Socialist) 1.9%
New York 17	Theodore A. Peyser	Democratic	1932	Incumbent re-elected.	▌ ✓ Theodore A. Peyser (Democratic) 52.1%; ▌Frederick F. Greenman (Republican) 44.4%; ▌William Edlin (Socialist) 1.9%; ▌Louis Burdenz (Communist) 1.6%
New York 18	Martin J. Kennedy	Democratic	1930	Incumbent re-elected.	▌ ✓ Martin J. Kennedy (Democratic) 72.9%; ▌William I. Cohen (Republican) 23.8%; ▌Horace Hollister (Socialist) 2.0%; ▌John P. Caldwell (Communist) 1.3%
New York 19	Sol Bloom	Democratic	1923 (special)	Incumbent re-elected.	▌ ✓ Sol Bloom (Democratic) 69.5%; ▌William S. Bennet (Republican) 23.3%; ▌John J. Neary (Independent) 3.4%; ▌Layle Lane (Socialist) 2.0%; ▌Thodore R. Bassett (Communist) 1.8%
New York 20	Vito Marcantonio	Republican	1934	Incumbent lost re-election. Democratic gain.	▌ ✓ James J. Lanzetta (Democratic) 51.2%; ▌Vito Marcantonio (Republican) 47.0%; ▌Jean J. Caranel (Socialist) 1.8%
New York 21	Joseph A. Gavagan	Democratic	1929 (special)	Incumbent re-elected.	▌ ✓ Joseph A. Gavagan (Democratic) 73.7%; ▌Malinda Alexander (Republican) 20.3%; ▌William F. McCann (Independent) 2.9%; ▌Murray Gross (Socialist) 1.9%; ▌Samuel C. Patterson (Communist) 1.2%
New York 22	Edward W. Curley	Democratic	1935 (special)	Incumbent re-elected.	▌ ✓ Edward W. Curley (Democratic) 77.6%; ▌Victor Santini (Republican) 19.2%; ▌David Tulchin (Socialist) 1.7%; ▌Richard Sullivan (Communist) 1.5%
New York 23	Charles A. Buckley	Democratic	1934	Incumbent re-elected.	▌ ✓ Charles A. Buckley (Democratic) 74.3%; ▌Isaac F. Becker (Republican) 18.9%; ▌Alice Udren (Communist) 3.8%; ▌Charles Hendley (Socialist) 3.0%
New York 24	James M. Fitzpatrick	Democratic	1926	Incumbent re-elected.	▌ ✓ James M. Fitzpatrick (Democratic) 65.2%; ▌Oliver C. Carpenter (Republican) 29.4%; ▌E. Primoff (Communist) 3.1%; ▌Jacob Jay (Socialist) 2.3%
New York 25	Charles D. Millard	Republican	1930	Incumbent re-elected.	▌ ✓ Charles D. Millard (Republican) 56.3%; ▌Homer A. Stebbins (Democratic) 42.0%; ▌Leonard Bright (Socialist) 1.4%; ▌Antonio Lombardo (Communist) 0.3%
New York 26	Hamilton Fish III	Republican	1920	Incumbent re-elected.	▌ ✓ Hamilton Fish III (Republican) 58.5%; ▌Alpha R. Whiton (Democratic) 39.7%; ▌Allan Irish (Socialist) 1.7%; ▌Ignazio Capnini (Communist) 0.1%
New York 27	Philip A. Goodwin	Republican	1932	Incumbent re-elected.	▌ ✓ Philip A. Goodwin (Republican) 57.2%; ▌D. Roy Shafer (Democratic) 40.9%; ▌Elizabeth Sedlar (Socialist) 1.6%; ▌I. Katzowitz (Communist) 0.3%
New York 28	Parker Corning	Democratic	1922	Incumbent retired. Democratic hold.	▌ ✓ William T. Byrne (Democratic) 58.4%; ▌Colin D. MacRae (Republican) 36.1%; ▌Frank A. Purcell (Square Deal) 3.6%; ▌Nelson Belanger (Socialist) 1.9%
New York 29	William D. Thomas	Republican	1934	Incumbent died. Republican hold.	▌ ✓ E. Harold Cluett (Republican) 61.3%; ▌John J. Nyhoff (Democratic) 36.6%; ▌Percy Dake (Socialist) 2.1%
New York 30	Frank Crowther	Republican	1918	Incumbent re-elected.	▌ ✓ Frank Crowther (Republican) 51.6%; ▌Earl E. Cummins (Democratic) 46.3%; ▌Lewi Tonks (Socialist) 1.9%; ▌Clarence Carr (Communist) 0.2%
New York 31	Bertrand Snell	Republican	1915 (special)	Incumbent re-elected.	▌ ✓ Bertrand Snell (Republican) 58.8%; ▌George C. Owens (Democratic) 34.5%; ▌Jesse W. Williams (Townsend) 6.7%
New York 32	Francis D. Culkin	Republican	1928	Incumbent re-elected.	▌ ✓ Francis D. Culkin (Republican) 66.1%; ▌Paul J. Woodard (Democratic) 32.5%; ▌Orley N. Tooley (Socialist) 1.4%
New York 33	Fred Sisson	Democratic	1932	Incumbent lost re-election. Republican gain.	▌ ✓ Fred J. Douglas (Republican) 53.1%; ▌Fred Sisson (Democratic) 38.6%; ▌William D. Arquint (Prosperity) 7.1%; ▌Peter Hansen (Socialist) 1.2%
New York 34	Bert Lord	Republican	1934	Incumbent re-elected.	▌ ✓ Bert Lord (Republican) 60.6%; ▌John T. Buckley (Democratic) 38.4%; ▌Merle A. Wilson (Socialist) 1.0%
New York 35	Clarence E. Hancock	Republican	1927 (special)	Incumbent re-elected.	▌ ✓ Clarence E. Hancock (Republican) 54.3%; ▌Arthur R. Perrin (Democratic) 37.8%; ▌Robert H. Anderson (Your) 6.2%; ▌Samuel M. Wolfson (Socialist) 1.5%; ▌Lempi Makela (Communist) 0.1%
New York 36	John Taber	Republican	1922	Incumbent re-elected.	▌ ✓ John Taber (Republican) 59.2%; ▌William A. Aiken (Democratic) 31.2%; ▌John E. DuBois (Townsend) 7.7%; ▌Walter O'Hagen (Socialist) 1.8%
New York 37	W. Sterling Cole	Republican	1934	Incumbent re-elected.	▌ ✓ W. Sterling Cole (Republican) 64.5%; ▌Paul Smith (Democratic) 34.1%; ▌Trevor Teele (Socialist) 1.3%; ▌Allen R. Chase (Communist) 0.1%
New York 38	James P. B. Duffy	Democratic	1934	Incumbent lost renomination. Democratic hold.	▌ ✓ George B. Kelly (Democratic) 51.6%; ▌Joseph Fritsch Jr. (Republican) 45.5%; ▌Glenn W. Simpson (Independent) 1.6%; ▌Richard Briggs (Socialist) 1.0%; ▌Ezra Harari (Communist) 0.3%
New York 39	James W. Wadsworth Jr.	Republican	1932	Incumbent re-elected.	▌ ✓ James W. Wadsworth Jr. (Republican) 58.5%; ▌Donald J. Corbett (Democratic) 36.5%; ▌Charles A. Lissow (Union) 3.3%; ▌Clair Walbridge (Socialist) 1.6%; ▌Canio Perrini (Communist) 0.2%
New York 40	Walter G. Andrews	Republican	1930	Incumbent re-elected.	▌ ✓ Walter G. Andrews (Republican) 52.5%; ▌John L. Beyer (Democratic) 37.8%; ▌Melvin A. Payne (Union) 7.5%; ▌Thomas Justice (Socialist) 1.9%; ▌Edwin Richards (Communist) 0.2%
New York 41	Alfred F. Beiter	Democratic	1932	Incumbent re-elected.	▌ ✓ Alfred F. Beiter (Democratic) 50.4%; ▌Fred Kohler (Republican) 41.0%; ▌Leonard P. Becht (Independent) 3.6%; ▌Benjamin M. Zalikowski (Independent) 3.3%; ▌Bruno Rantane (Socialist) 1.5%; ▌Frank Herron (Communist) 0.2%
New York 42	James M. Mead	Democratic	1918	Incumbent re-elected.	▌ ✓ James M. Mead (Democratic) 56.4%; ▌Eugene D. Crooker (Republican) 32.0%; ▌Anthony Fitzgibbons (Independent) 6.8%; ▌John J. Szczepaniak (Independent) 3.3%; ▌Fred Riefler (Socialist) 1.3%; ▌Mattie Green (Communist) 0.2%
New York 43	Daniel A. Reed	Republican	1918	Incumbent re-elected.	▌ ✓ Daniel A. Reed (Republican) 54.9%; ▌Clare Barnes (Democratic) 43.6%; ▌Joseph J. O'Brocta (Socialist) 1.3%; ▌Axel W. Berggren (Communist) 0.2%
New York at-large	Matthew J. Merritt	Democratic	1934	Incumbent re-elected.	▌ ✓ Matthew J. Merritt (Democratic) 28.8%; ▌ ✓ Caroline O'Day (Democratic) 28.6%; ▌Natalie F. Couch (Republican) 19.9%; ▌Anthony J. Contiguglia (Republican) 19.4%; ▌Edna Mitchell Blue (Socialist) 1.0%; ▌Frank Crosswaith (Socialist) 1.0%; ▌Roy Hudson (Communist) 0.7%; ▌Si Gerson (Communist) 0.7%
New York at-large	Caroline O'Day	Democratic	1934	Incumbent re-elected.	▌ ✓ Matthew J. Merritt (Democratic) 28.8%; ▌ ✓ Caroline O'Day (Democratic) 28.6%; ▌Natalie F. Couch (Republican) 19.9%; ▌Anthony J. Contiguglia (Republican) 19.4%; ▌Edna Mitchell Blue (Socialist) 1.0%; ▌Frank Crosswaith (Socialist) 1.0%; ▌Roy Hudson (Communist) 0.7%; ▌Si Gerson (Communist) 0.7%

== North Carolina ==
District	Incumbent			This race	
District	Member	Party	First elected	Results	Candidates
North Carolina 1	Lindsay C. Warren	Democratic	1924	Incumbent re-elected.	▌ ✓ Lindsay C. Warren (Democratic) 90.2%; ▌John Wilkinson (Republican) 9.8%
North Carolina 2	John H. Kerr	Democratic	1923 (special)	Incumbent re-elected.	▌ ✓ John H. Kerr (Democratic) 95.2%; ▌E. Dana Dickens (Republican) 4.8%
North Carolina 3	Graham Arthur Barden	Democratic	1934	Incumbent re-elected.	▌ ✓ Graham Arthur Barden (Democratic) 74.3%; ▌Julian T. Gaskill (Republican) 25.7%
North Carolina 4	Harold D. Cooley	Democratic	1934	Incumbent re-elected.	▌ ✓ Harold D. Cooley (Democratic) 76.7%; ▌A. I. Ferree (Republican) 23.3%
North Carolina 5	Franklin Wills Hancock Jr.	Democratic	1930	Incumbent re-elected.	▌ ✓ Franklin Wills Hancock Jr. (Democratic) 73.3%; ▌Edward F. Butler (Republican) 26.7%
North Carolina 6	William B. Umstead	Democratic	1932	Incumbent re-elected.	▌ ✓ William B. Umstead (Democratic) 69.8%; ▌Willis H. Slane (Republican) 30.2%
North Carolina 7	J. Bayard Clark	Democratic	1928	Incumbent re-elected.	▌ ✓ J. Bayard Clark (Democratic) 83.2%; ▌W. C. Downing (Republican) 16.8%
North Carolina 8	Walter Lambeth	Democratic	1930	Incumbent re-elected.	▌ ✓ Walter Lambeth (Democratic) 64.1%; ▌Kyle Hayes (Republican) 35.9%
North Carolina 9	Robert L. Doughton	Democratic	1910	Incumbent re-elected.	▌ ✓ Robert L. Doughton (Democratic) 64.8%; ▌Watt H. Gragg (Republican) 35.2%
North Carolina 10	Alfred L. Bulwinkle	Democratic	1930	Incumbent re-elected.	▌ ✓ Alfred L. Bulwinkle (Democratic) 65.5%; ▌Calvin R. Edney (Republican) 34.5%
North Carolina 11	Zebulon Weaver	Democratic	1930	Incumbent re-elected.	▌ ✓ Zebulon Weaver (Democratic) 62.9%; ▌Clyde H. Jarrett (Republican) 37.1%

== North Dakota ==
District	Incumbent			This race	
District	Member	Party	First elected	Results	Candidates
North Dakota at-large	William Lemke	Republican-NPL	1932	Incumbent re-elected.	▌ ✓ William Lemke (Republican-NPL) 29.3%; ▌ ✓ Usher L. Burdick (Republican-NPL) 25.9%; ▌Henry Holt (Democratic) 22.5%; ▌J. J. Nygaard (Democratic) 20.0%; ▌I. J. Moe (Independent) 0.7%; ▌P. H. Miller (Independent) 0.7%; ▌E. A. Johansson (Independent) 0.6%; ▌Jasper Haaland (Communist) 0.1%; ▌W. D. Webster (Communist) 0.1%
North Dakota at-large	Usher L. Burdick	Republican-NPL	1934	Incumbent re-elected.	▌ ✓ William Lemke (Republican-NPL) 29.3%; ▌ ✓ Usher L. Burdick (Republican-NPL) 25.9%; ▌Henry Holt (Democratic) 22.5%; ▌J. J. Nygaard (Democratic) 20.0%; ▌I. J. Moe (Independent) 0.7%; ▌P. H. Miller (Independent) 0.7%; ▌E. A. Johansson (Independent) 0.6%; ▌Jasper Haaland (Communist) 0.1%; ▌W. D. Webster (Communist) 0.1%

== Ohio ==
District	Incumbent			This race	
District	Member	Party	First elected	Results	Candidates
Ohio 1	John B. Hollister	Republican	1931 (special)	Incumbent lost re-election. Democratic gain.	▌ ✓ Joseph A. Dixon (Democratic) 52.1%; ▌John B. Hollister (Republican) 47.9%
Ohio 2	William E. Hess	Republican	1928	Incumbent lost re-election. Democratic gain.	▌ ✓ Herbert S. Bigelow (Democratic) 51.8%; ▌William E. Hess (Republican) 48.2%
Ohio 3	Byron B. Harlan	Democratic	1930	Incumbent re-elected.	▌ ✓ Byron B. Harlan (Democratic) 55.9%; ▌Robert N. Brumbaugh (Republican) 38.7%; ▌Leonidas E. Speer (Independent) 5.5%
Ohio 4	Frank L. Kloeb	Democratic	1932	Incumbent re-elected.	▌ ✓ Frank L. Kloeb (Democratic) 53.7%; ▌Robert W. Yurner (Republican) 46.3%
Ohio 5	Frank C. Kniffin	Democratic	1930	Incumbent re-elected.	▌ ✓ Frank C. Kniffin (Democratic) 53.1%; ▌Stephan S. Beard (Republican) 42.3%; ▌Fred L. Hay (Independent) 4.7%
Ohio 6	James G. Polk	Democratic	1930	Incumbent re-elected.	▌ ✓ James G. Polk (Democratic) 54.6%; ▌Emory F. Smith (Republican) 45.4%
Ohio 7	Leroy T. Marshall	Republican	1932	Incumbent lost re-election. Democratic gain.	▌ ✓ Arthur W. Aleshire (Democratic) 50.4%; ▌Leroy T. Marshall (Republican) 49.6%
Ohio 8	Thomas B. Fletcher	Democratic	1932	Incumbent re-elected.	▌ ✓ Thomas B. Fletcher (Democratic) 53.9%; ▌Grant E. Mouser Jr. (Republican) 46.1%
Ohio 9	Warren J. Duffey	Democratic	1932	Incumbent lost renomination. Democratic hold.	▌ ✓ John F. Hunter (Democratic) 56.3%; ▌Raymond E. Hildebrand (Republican) 40.9%; ▌Earl O. Lehman (Independent) 2.8%
Ohio 10	Thomas A. Jenkins	Republican	1924	Incumbent re-elected.	▌ ✓ Thomas A. Jenkins (Republican) 57.7%; ▌O. J. Kleffner (Democratic) 42.3%
Ohio 11	Mell G. Underwood	Democratic	1922	Incumbent resigned April 10, 1936 to become a U.S. District Judge. Democratic hold.	▌ ✓ Harold K. Claypool (Democratic) 53.4%; ▌L. P. Mooney (Republican) 42.5%; ▌James E. Ford (Independent) 4.1%
Ohio 12	Arthur P. Lamneck	Democratic	1930	Incumbent re-elected.	▌ ✓ Arthur P. Lamneck (Democratic) 57.7%; ▌Grant P. Ward (Republican) 42.3%
Ohio 13	William L. Fiesinger	Democratic	1930	Incumbent lost renomination. Republican gain.	▌ ✓ Dudley A. White (Republican) 47.3%; ▌Forrest R. Block (Democratic) 39.6%; ▌Merrell E. Martin (Independent) 13.1%
Ohio 14	Dow W. Harter	Democratic	1932	Incumbent re-elected.	▌ ✓ Dow W. Harter (Democratic) 58.1%; ▌Carl D. Sheppard (Republican) 37.7%; ▌Park Sumner (Independent) 4.3%
Ohio 15	Robert T. Secrest	Democratic	1932	Incumbent re-elected.	▌ ✓ Robert T. Secrest (Democratic) 55.7%; ▌Kenneth C. Ray (Republican) 44.0%; ▌Joe I. Clarke (Independent) 0.3%
Ohio 16	William R. Thom	Democratic	1932	Incumbent re-elected.	▌ ✓ William R. Thom (Democratic) 59.2%; ▌H. Ross Ake (Republican) 36.2%; ▌A. M. Hickey (Independent) 3.0%; ▌Jacob S. Coxey Sr. (Union) 1.6%
Ohio 17	William A. Ashbrook	Democratic	1934	Incumbent re-elected.	▌ ✓ William A. Ashbrook (Democratic) 57.7%; ▌James A. Glenn (Republican) 40.1%; ▌William Edward Lyle (Independent) 2.2%
Ohio 18	Lawrence E. Imhoff	Democratic	1932	Incumbent re-elected.	▌ ✓ Lawrence E. Imhoff (Democratic) 60.5%; ▌Earl R. Lewis (Republican) 39.5%
Ohio 19	John G. Cooper	Republican	1914	Incumbent lost re-election. Democratic gain.	▌ ✓ Michael J. Kirwan (Democratic) 58.4%; ▌John G. Cooper (Republican) 41.1%; ▌Joe Dallet (Communist) 0.5%
Ohio 20	Martin L. Sweeney	Democratic	1931 (special)	Incumbent re-elected.	▌ ✓ Martin L. Sweeney (Democratic) 54.4%; ▌Blase A. Buonpane (Republican) 23.4%; ▌John L. Mihelich (Independent) 22.2%
Ohio 21	Robert Crosser	Democratic	1922	Incumbent re-elected.	▌ ✓ Robert Crosser (Democratic) 74.8%; ▌Harry C. Gahn (Republican) 25.2%
Ohio 22	Chester C. Bolton	Republican	1928	Incumbent lost re-election. Democratic gain.	▌ ✓ Anthony A. Fleger (Democratic) 51.3%; ▌Chester C. Bolton (Republican) 48.7%
Ohio at-large	Charles V. Truax	Democratic	1932	Incumbent died. Democratic hold.	▌ ✓ John McSweeney (Democratic) 28.7%; ▌Harold G. Mosier (Democratic) 27.6%; ▌George H. Bender (Republican) 22.7%; ▌L. L. Marshall (Republican) 20.8%; ▌William C. Sandberg (Communist) 0.2%
Ohio at-large	Stephen M. Young	Democratic	1932	Incumbent retired to run for Governor of Ohio. Democratic hold.	▌ ✓ John McSweeney (Democratic) 28.7%; ▌Harold G. Mosier (Democratic) 27.6%; ▌George H. Bender (Republican) 22.7%; ▌L. L. Marshall (Republican) 20.8%; ▌William C. Sandberg (Communist) 0.2%

== Oklahoma ==
District	Incumbent			This race	
District	Member	Party	First elected	Results	Candidates
Oklahoma 1	Wesley E. Disney	Democratic	1930	Incumbent re-elected.	▌ ✓ Wesley E. Disney (Democratic) 57.7%; ▌Jo O. Ferguson (Republican) 41.9%; ▌William Lincoln Garver (Socialist) 0.3%; ▌C. A. Wickstrum (Independent) 0.2%
Oklahoma 2	John Conover Nichols	Democratic	1934	Incumbent re-elected.	▌ ✓ John Conover Nichols (Democratic) 63.5%; ▌V. S. Cannon (Republican) 36.5%
Oklahoma 3	Wilburn Cartwright	Democratic	1926	Incumbent re-elected.	▌ ✓ Wilburn Cartwright (Democratic) 79.9%; ▌John D. Morrison (Republican) 20.1%
Oklahoma 4	Percy Lee Gassaway	Democratic	1934	Incumbent lost renomination. Democratic hold.	▌ ✓ Lyle Boren (Democratic) 72.7%; ▌Fred L. Patrick (Republican) 27.1%; ▌S. P. Green (Independent) 0.1%
Oklahoma 5	Joshua B. Lee	Democratic	1934	Incumbent retired to run for U.S. senator. Democratic hold.	▌ ✓ Robert P. Hill (Democratic) 70.2%; ▌John William Mee (Republican) 29.4%; ▌S. A. Rourke (Independent) 0.2%; ▌T. B. Williams (Independent) 0.2%
Oklahoma 6	Jed Johnson	Democratic	1926	Incumbent re-elected.	▌ ✓ Jed Johnson (Democratic) 72.8%; ▌L. M. Gensman (Republican) 27.1%; ▌E. B. Sandfort (Independent) 0.1%
Oklahoma 7	Sam C. Massingale	Democratic	1934	Incumbent re-elected.	▌ ✓ Sam C. Massingale (Democratic) 83.3%; ▌Clyde J. Matherly (Republican) 16.7%
Oklahoma 8	Phil Ferguson	Democratic	1934	Incumbent re-elected.	▌ ✓ Phil Ferguson (Democratic) 58.9%; ▌T. J. Sargent (Republican) 40.7%; ▌Leora M. Wales (Prohibition) 0.3%; ▌H. C. Geist (Independent) 0.1%
Oklahoma at-large	Will Rogers	Democratic	1932	Incumbent re-elected.	▌ ✓ Will Rogers (Democratic) 70.7%; ▌John C. Burns (Republican) 28.8%; ▌Burn B. Leverich (Socialist) 0.3%; ▌Lewis S. Redwine (Prohibition) 0.2%

== Oregon ==
District	Incumbent			This race	
District	Member	Party	First elected	Results	Candidates
Oregon 1	James W. Mott	Republican	1932	Incumbent re-elected.	▌ ✓ James W. Mott (Republican) 65.6%; ▌E. W. Kirkpatrick (Democratic) 34.4%
Oregon 2	Walter M. Pierce	Democratic	1932	Incumbent re-elected.	▌ ✓ Walter M. Pierce (Democratic) 68.0%; ▌Roy W. Ritner (Republican) 32.0%
Oregon 3	William A. Ekwall	Republican	1934	Incumbent lost re-election. Democratic gain.	▌ ✓ Nan Wood Honeyman (Democratic) 53.2%; ▌William A. Ekwall (Republican) 31.0%; ▌John A. Jeffrey (Independent) 14.8%; ▌Carl V. Soderback (Socialist Labor) 0.5%; ▌Grace Wick (Independent) 0.5%

== Pennsylvania ==
District	Incumbent			This race	
District	Member	Party	First elected	Results	Candidates
Pennsylvania 1	Harry C. Ransley	Republican	1920	Incumbent lost re-election. Democratic gain.	▌ ✓ Leon Sacks (Democratic) 64.6%; ▌Harry C. Ransley (Republican) 33.4%; ▌Louis A. Manfredi (Old Age Pension) 1.6%; ▌Constantino Lippa (Communist) 0.2%; ▌Gamshei Kutikoff (Socialist) 0.2%
Pennsylvania 2	William H. Wilson	Republican	1934	Incumbent lost re-election. Democratic gain.	▌ ✓ James P. McGranery (Democratic) 59.8%; ▌William H. Wilson (Republican) 37.5%; ▌Thomas M. Lacy (Royal Oak) 2.3%; ▌David Braginsky (Socialist) 0.3%; ▌David Davis (Farmer–Labor) 0.1%
Pennsylvania 3	Clare G. Fenerty	Republican	1934	Incumbent lost re-election. Democratic gain.	▌ ✓ Michael J. Bradley (Democratic) 60.8%; ▌Clare G. Fenerty (Republican) 38.7%; ▌Robert Fletcher (Socialist) 0.2%; ▌Gladys Zeeman (Communist) 0.2%; ▌William Leader (Independent) 0.005%
Pennsylvania 4	J. Burrwood Daly	Democratic	1934	Incumbent re-elected.	▌ ✓ J. Burrwood Daly (Democratic) 62.8%; ▌Boise Penrose Jr. (Republican) 33.7%; ▌David B. Hughes (American) 3.1%; ▌William Eckel (Socialist) 0.3%; ▌John W. Reedy Sr. (Farmer–Labor) 0.1%; ▌Edwin S. Mckin (Commonwealth) 0.002%
Pennsylvania 5	Frank J. G. Dorsey	Democratic	1934	Incumbent re-elected.	▌ ✓ Frank J. G. Dorsey (Democratic) 56.7%; ▌James J. Connolly (Republican) 36.1%; ▌William M. Leader (Farmer–Labor) 7.0%; ▌William Eckels (Socialist) 0.2%
Pennsylvania 6	Michael J. Stack	Democratic	1934	Incumbent re-elected.	▌ ✓ Michael J. Stack (Democratic) 61.1%; ▌George F. Holmes (Republican) 37.5%; ▌Charles Krueger (Roosevelt New Deal) 0.7%; ▌Harry Berger (Socialist) 0.3%; ▌Norris Erlichman (Communist) 0.3%; ▌Albert H. Coggins (Commonwealth) 0.04%
Pennsylvania 7	George P. Darrow	Republican	1914	Incumbent lost re-election. Democratic gain.	▌ ✓ Ira W. Drew (Democratic) 51.8%; ▌George P. Darrow (Republican) 47.7%; ▌David Felix (Socialist) 0.4%; ▌Thomas F. Lester (Social Justice) 0.1%; ▌William Leader (Independent) 0.002%
Pennsylvania 8	James Wolfenden	Republican	1928	Incumbent re-elected.	▌ ✓ James Wolfenden (Republican) 52.2%; ▌Howard Kirk (Democratic) 47.1%; ▌Jesse H. Holm (Socialist) 0.4%; ▌C. Wilfred Conard (Prohibition) 0.3%
Pennsylvania 9	Oliver W. Frey	Democratic	1933 (special)	Incumbent re-elected.	▌ ✓ Oliver W. Frey (Democratic) 51.0%; ▌Theodore R. Gardner (Republican) 45.8%; ▌Charles Henry Weller (Royal Oak) 2.2%; ▌Louis Shoemaker (Socialist) 0.6%; ▌Harry B. Parks (Farmer–Labor) 0.4%
Pennsylvania 10	J. Roland Kinzer	Republican	1930	Incumbent re-elected.	▌ ✓ J. Roland Kinzer (Republican) 52.7%; ▌H. Clay Burkholder (Democratic) 45.8%; ▌Owen E. Conn (Royal Oak) 1.2%; ▌William W. Halligan (Socialist) 0.3%; ▌Harry C. Rote (Communist) 0.06%
Pennsylvania 11	Patrick J. Boland	Democratic	1930	Incumbent re-elected.	▌ ✓ Patrick J. Boland (Democratic) 57.5%; ▌John J. Owens (Republican) 38.0%; ▌James B. Murrin (Independent) 4.2%; ▌Noah Altshuler (Socialist) 0.3%
Pennsylvania 12	Charles Murray Turpin	Republican	1929 (special)	Incumbent lost re-election. Democratic gain.	▌ ✓ J. Harold Flannery (Democratic) 53.7%; ▌Charles Murray Turpin (Republican) 46.0%; ▌Joseph Calabelle (Socialist) 0.3%
Pennsylvania 13	James H. Gildea	Democratic	1934	Incumbent re-elected.	▌ ✓ James H. Gildea (Democratic) 54.6%; ▌James H. Kirchner (Republican) 44.9%; ▌Thomas W. Howells (Socialist) 0.4%; ▌Peter Paul (Communist) 0.1%
Pennsylvania 14	William Emanuel Richardson	Democratic	1932	Incumbent lost renomination. Democratic hold.	▌ ✓ Guy L. Moser (Democratic) 53.3%; ▌Charles E. Roth (Republican) 32.3%; ▌Raymond S. Hofses (Socialist) 13.0%; ▌Howard Moser (Independent) 0.8%; ▌Charles Althouse (Independent) 0.7%
Pennsylvania 15	Charles E. Dietrich	Democratic	1934	Incumbent lost re-election. Republican gain.	▌ ✓ Albert G. Rutherford (Republican) 54.3%; ▌Charles E. Dietrich (Democratic) 45.0%; ▌Edward Ace (Prohibition) 0.5%; ▌B. W. Bowman (Socialist) 0.2%
Pennsylvania 16	Robert F. Rich	Republican	1930	Incumbent re-elected.	▌ ✓ Robert F. Rich (Republican) 51.8%; ▌Paul A. Rothfuss (Democratic) 47.2%; ▌W. F. Kunkle (Prohibition) 0.6%; ▌George Hartman (Socialist) 0.3%
Pennsylvania 17	J. William Ditter	Republican	1932	Incumbent re-elected.	▌ ✓ J. William Ditter (Republican) 53.9%; ▌George H. Bartholomew (Democratic) 43.8%; ▌Frank P. Kleshick (Royal Oak) 1.8%; ▌George W. Bause (Socialist) 0.5%
Pennsylvania 18	Benjamin K. Focht	Republican	1932	Incumbent re-elected.	▌ ✓ Benjamin K. Focht (Republican) 54.0%; ▌John M. Keichline (Democratic) 46.0%
Pennsylvania 19	Isaac Hoffer Doutrich	Republican	1926	Incumbent lost re-election. Democratic gain.	▌ ✓ Guy J. Swope (Democratic) 51.4%; ▌Isaac Hoffer Doutrich (Republican) 47.5%; ▌Harold V. McNair (Thomas Jefferson) 0.4%; ▌Milton Ibach (Socialist) 0.4%; ▌Paul K. Evans (Farmer–Labor) 0.3%
Pennsylvania 20	Denis J. Driscoll	Democratic	1934	Incumbent lost re-election. Republican gain.	▌ ✓ Benjamin Jarrett (Republican) 48.4%; ▌Denis J. Driscoll (Democratic) 46.9%; ▌John W. Ownes (Royal Oak) 3.3%; ▌Robert G. Burnham (Prohibition) 1.1%; ▌R. S. Stewart (Socialist) 0.3%
Pennsylvania 21	Francis E. Walter	Democratic	1932	Incumbent re-elected.	▌ ✓ Francis E. Walter (Democratic) 56.8%; ▌William R. Coyle (Republican) 39.7%; ▌Joseph H. Daley (Royal Oak) 3.1%; ▌Paul Cotton (Socialist) 0.5%
Pennsylvania 22	Harry L. Haines	Democratic	1930	Incumbent re-elected.	▌ ✓ Harry L. Haines (Democratic) 54.7%; ▌Frank S. Magill (Republican) 40.6%; ▌George D. Sheely (Prohibition) 4.3%; ▌Truman J. Keesey (Farmer–Labor) 0.2%; ▌Francis M. Fishbaugh (Townsend) 0.2%
Pennsylvania 23	Don Gingery	Democratic	1934	Incumbent re-elected.	▌ ✓ Don Gingery (Democratic) 48.9%; ▌Benjamin C. Jones (Republican) 42.6%; ▌Charles S. Kniss (Townsend) 7.8%; ▌George W. Hartmann (Socialist) 0.7%
Pennsylvania 24	J. Buell Snyder	Democratic	1932	Incumbent re-elected.	▌ ✓ J. Buell Snyder (Democratic) 60.5%; ▌Davis W. Henderson (Republican) 39.1%; ▌Charles H. Musgrove (Socialist) 0.3%
Pennsylvania 25	Charles I. Faddis	Democratic	1932	Incumbent re-elected.	▌ ✓ Charles I. Faddis (Democratic) 65.5%; ▌John C. Judson (Republican) 31.9%; ▌Leo B. Schoener (Socialist) 2.2%; ▌David Morris (Prohibition) 0.4%
Pennsylvania 26	Charles R. Eckert	Democratic	1934	Incumbent re-elected.	▌ ✓ Charles R. Eckert (Democratic) 56.0%; ▌Orville Brown (Republican) 41.5%; ▌Edwin F. G. Harper (Townsend) 1.6%; ▌George Sowash (Prohibition) 0.6%; ▌Sam McKee (Socialist) 0.3%
Pennsylvania 27	Joseph Anthony Gray	Democratic	1934	Incumbent re-elected.	▌ ✓ Joseph Anthony Gray (Democratic) 54.1%; ▌Walter E. Morris (Republican) 43.7%; ▌Walter A. Stutzman (Townsend) 1.4%; ▌Clark Witherow (Prohibition) 0.4%; ▌Gerald Lyons (Socialist) 0.3%; ▌F. D. Kirsch (Jeffersonian) 0.08%
Pennsylvania 28	William M. Berlin	Democratic	1932	Incumbent lost renomination. Democratic hold.	▌ ✓ Robert G. Allen (Democratic) 60.2%; ▌James B. Weaver (Republican) 37.9%; ▌John R. Keister (Socialist) 1.4%; ▌S. W. Bierer (Prohibition) 0.4%
Pennsylvania 29	Charles N. Crosby	Democratic	1932	Incumbent re-elected.	▌ ✓ Charles N. Crosby (Democratic) 53.7%; ▌Will Rose (Republican) 44.6%; ▌James E. Condren (Union) 0.8%; ▌Thomas Lindey (Socialist) 0.5%; ▌O. B. Patterson (Prohibition) 0.3%
Pennsylvania 30	J. Twing Brooks	Democratic	1932	Incumbent lost renomination. Democratic hold.	▌ ✓ Peter J. De Muth (Democratic) 59.4%; ▌James A. Geltz (Republican) 39.8%; ▌Sarah Z. Limbach (Socialist) 0.6%; ▌Gladden William James (United) 0.2%
Pennsylvania 31	James L. Quinn	Democratic	1934	Incumbent re-elected.	▌ ✓ James L. Quinn (Democratic) 63.0%; ▌James H. McClure (Republican) 35.3%; ▌William Ebling (Farmer–Labor) 1.0%; ▌William Adams (Socialist) 0.7%
Pennsylvania 32	Theodore L. Moritz	Democratic	1934	Incumbent lost re-election as a Progressive. Democratic hold.	▌ ✓ Herman P. Eberharter (Democratic) 66.2%; ▌Jacob E. Kalson (Republican) 28.0%; ▌Theodore L. Moritz (Progressive) 4.9%; ▌Max Weisman (Socialist) 0.4%; ▌Ben Careathers (Communist) 0.3%; ▌Samuel K. Cunningham (Prohibition) 0.2%
Pennsylvania 33	Henry Ellenbogen	Democratic	1932	Incumbent re-elected.	▌ ✓ Henry Ellenbogen (Democratic) 64.5%; ▌Edward O. Tabor (Republican) 35.1%; ▌George F. Griffiths (Socialist) 0.4%
Pennsylvania 34	Matthew A. Dunn	Democratic	1932	Incumbent re-elected.	▌ ✓ Matthew A. Dunn (Democratic) 64.4%; ▌Elmer A. Barchfeld (Republican) 35.2%; ▌Herbert Pastorious (Socialist) 0.4%

== Rhode Island ==
District	Incumbent			This race	
District	Member	Party	First elected	Results	Candidates
Rhode Island 1	Charles Risk	Republican	1935 (special)	Incumbent lost re-election. Democratic gain.	▌ ✓ Aime Forand (Democratic) 50.5%; ▌Charles Risk (Republican) 42.6%; ▌Dunn (Union) 6.9%; ▌Le May (Independent) 0.09%
Rhode Island 2	John M. O'Connell	Democratic	1932	Incumbent re-elected.	▌ ✓ John M. O'Connell (Democratic) 47.9%; ▌George C. Clark (Republican) 45.3%; ▌Dougherty (Union) 6.7%; ▌Isaac Moses (Good Government) 0.1%

== South Carolina ==
District	Incumbent			This race	
District	Member	Party	First elected	Results	Candidates
South Carolina 1	Thomas S. McMillan	Democratic	1924	Incumbent re-elected.	▌ ✓ Thomas S. McMillan (Democratic) 96.9%; ▌B. L. Hendrick (Independent) 1.9%; ▌Ben Felman (Republican) 1.2%
South Carolina 2	Hampton P. Fulmer	Democratic	1920	Incumbent re-elected.	▌ ✓ Hampton P. Fulmer (Democratic) 98.3%; ▌S. J. Leaphart (Independent) 1.1%; ▌L. A. Black (Republican) 0.6%; ▌A. B. McCraw (Independent) 0.02%
South Carolina 3	John C. Taylor	Democratic	1932	Incumbent re-elected.	▌ ✓ John C. Taylor (Democratic) 99.0%; ▌O. B. Menees (Independent) 0.6%; ▌A. F. Earnest (Independent) 0.4%; ▌W. E. Murray (Independent) 0.01%
South Carolina 4	John J. McSwain	Democratic	1920	Incumbent retired. Democratic hold.	▌ ✓ Gabriel H. Mahon Jr. (Democratic) 98.9%; ▌W. E. Murray (Independent) 0.6%; ▌Frank W. Faux (Republican) 0.5%
South Carolina 5	James P. Richards	Democratic	1932	Incumbent re-elected.	▌ ✓ James P. Richards (Democratic) 99.2%; ▌C. F. Pendleton (Republican) 0.7%; ▌A. B. McCraw (Independent) 0.1%
South Carolina 6	Allard H. Gasque	Democratic	1922	Incumbent re-elected.	▌ ✓ Allard H. Gasque (Democratic) 99.3%; ▌Thomas J. Karnes (Republican) 0.4%; ▌C. R. Davis (Republican) 0.2%; ▌H. J. Johnson (Independent) 0.01%

== South Dakota ==
District	Incumbent			This race	
District	Member	Party	First elected	Results	Candidates
South Dakota 1	Fred H. Hildebrandt	Democratic	1932	Incumbent re-elected.	▌ ✓ Fred H. Hildebrandt (Democratic) 50.6%; ▌Karl Mundt (Republican) 49.4%
South Dakota 2	Theodore B. Werner	Democratic	1932	Incumbent lost re-election. Republican gain.	▌ ✓ Francis Case (Republican) 51.7%; ▌Theodore B. Werner (Democratic) 48.3%

== Tennessee ==
District	Incumbent			This race	
District	Member	Party	First elected	Results	Candidates
Tennessee 1	B. Carroll Reece	Republican	1932	Incumbent re-elected.	▌ ✓ B. Carroll Reece (Republican) 60.4%; ▌William M. Crawford (Democratic) 31.2%; ▌Charles W. Clark (Independent) 8.4%
Tennessee 2	J. Will Taylor	Republican	1918	Incumbent re-elected.	▌ ✓ J. Will Taylor (Republican) 50.8%; ▌John T. O'Connor (Democratic) 48.8%; ▌Calvin Rutherford (Independent) 0.5%
Tennessee 3	Sam D. McReynolds	Democratic	1922	Incumbent re-elected.	▌ ✓ Sam D. McReynolds (Democratic) 68.0%; ▌William Hillery (Republican) 32.0%
Tennessee 4	John Ridley Mitchell	Democratic	1930	Incumbent re-elected.	▌ ✓ John Ridley Mitchell (Democratic) 81.8%; ▌H. E. McLean (Republican) 18.2%
Tennessee 5	Jo Byrns	Democratic	1908	Incumbent died. Democratic hold.	▌ ✓ Richard Merrill Atkinson (Democratic) 94.1%; ▌E. L. Bradbury (Republican) 5.9%
Tennessee 6	Clarence W. Turner	Democratic	1932	Incumbent re-elected.	▌ ✓ Clarence W. Turner (Democratic) 80.9%; ▌M. C. Ridings (Republican) 19.1%
Tennessee 7	Herron C. Pearson	Democratic	1934	Incumbent re-elected.	▌ ✓ Herron C. Pearson (Democratic); Uncontested
Tennessee 8	Jere Cooper	Democratic	1928	Incumbent re-elected.	▌ ✓ Jere Cooper (Democratic) 93.8%; ▌Allen J. Strawbridge (Republican) 6.2%
Tennessee 9	Walter Chandler	Democratic	1934	Incumbent re-elected.	▌ ✓ Walter Chandler (Democratic) 99.2%; ▌Lewis V. Phillipi (Independent) 0.8%

== Texas ==
District	Incumbent			This race	
District	Member	Party	First elected	Results	Candidates
Texas 1	Wright Patman	Democratic	1928	Incumbent re-elected.	▌ ✓ Wright Patman (Democratic) 97.6%; ▌P. B. Gibbons (Republican) 2.4%
Texas 2	Martin Dies Jr.	Democratic	1930	Incumbent re-elected.	▌ ✓ Martin Dies Jr. (Democratic) 100.0%; ▌A. E. Sweatland (Independent) 0.005%; ▌Sam Lipscomb (Independent) 0.003%
Texas 3	Morgan G. Sanders	Democratic	1920	Incumbent re-elected.	▌ ✓ Morgan G. Sanders (Democratic) 96.3%; ▌N. E. Hendrickson (Republican) 3.7%
Texas 4	Sam Rayburn	Democratic	1912	Incumbent re-elected.	▌ ✓ Sam Rayburn (Democratic) 97.5%; ▌Ross E. Johnson (Independent) 2.5%
Texas 5	Hatton W. Sumners	Democratic	1914	Incumbent re-elected.	▌ ✓ Hatton W. Sumners (Democratic) 88.5%; ▌Dee C. Humphrey (Republican) 11.2%; ▌J. W. Chandler (Independent) 0.2%
Texas 6	Luther A. Johnson	Democratic	1922	Incumbent re-elected.	▌ ✓ Luther A. Johnson (Democratic) 97.3%; ▌C. David Thompson (Republican) 2.7%
Texas 7	Nat Patton	Democratic	1934	Incumbent re-elected.	▌ ✓ Nat Patton (Democratic) 97.6%; ▌O. J. Read (Republican) 2.4%
Texas 8	Joe H. Eagle	Democratic	1933 (special)	Incumbent retired to run for U.S. senator. Democratic hold.	▌ ✓ Albert Thomas (Democratic) 91.8%; ▌Roy B. Nichols (Republican) 8.1%; ▌A. C. Henderson (Independent) 0.1%
Texas 9	Joseph J. Mansfield	Democratic	1916	Incumbent re-elected.	▌ ✓ Joseph J. Mansfield (Democratic) 93.2%; ▌F. W. Dusek (Republican) 6.8%; ▌Louis Allen (Independent) 0.003%
Texas 10	James P. Buchanan	Democratic	1912	Incumbent re-elected.	▌ ✓ James P. Buchanan (Democratic) 99.5%; ▌David Lyons (Independent) 0.5%; ▌E. J. Enoch (Independent) 0.003%; ▌O. L. Ulrich (Independent) 0.003%
Texas 11	Oliver H. Cross	Democratic	1928	Incumbent retired. Democratic hold.	▌ ✓ William R. Poage (Democratic) 100.0%; ▌T. V. Freeman (Independent) 0.006%; ▌C. A. Sherman (Independent) 0.003%
Texas 12	Fritz G. Lanham	Democratic	1919 (special)	Incumbent re-elected.	▌ ✓ Fritz G. Lanham (Democratic) 93.3%; ▌Arnold Davis (Republican) 6.7%; ▌Julian C. Hyer (Independent) 0.002%; ▌Nat Patton (Independent) 0.002%
Texas 13	William D. McFarlane	Democratic	1932	Incumbent re-elected.	▌ ✓ William D. McFarlane (Democratic) 95.2%; ▌R. L. Ratliff (Republican) 4.8%
Texas 14	Richard M. Kleberg	Democratic	1931 (special)	Incumbent re-elected.	▌ ✓ Richard M. Kleberg (Democratic) 92.1%; ▌Howell Ward (Republican) 7.9%; ▌Adolph Seideman (Independent) 0.02%; ▌Ed Lyons (Independent) 0.002%
Texas 15	Milton H. West	Democratic	1933 (special)	Incumbent re-elected.	▌ ✓ Milton H. West (Democratic) 82.6%; ▌J. A. Simpson (Independent) 17.4%
Texas 16	R. Ewing Thomason	Democratic	1930	Incumbent re-elected.	▌ ✓ R. Ewing Thomason (Democratic) 100.0%; ▌U. S. Goen (Independent) 0.01%; ▌J. Johnson (Independent) 0.004%; ▌Lytton Taylor (Independent) 0.004%
Texas 17	Thomas L. Blanton	Democratic	1930	Incumbent lost renomination. Democratic hold.	▌ ✓ Clyde L. Garrett (Democratic) 100.0%; ▌W. F. Nelson (Independent) 0.03%
Texas 18	John Marvin Jones	Democratic	1916	Incumbent re-elected.	▌ ✓ John Marvin Jones (Democratic) 94.1%; ▌S. E. Fish (Republican) 5.3%; ▌Theodore Conrad (Independent) 0.6%
Texas 19	George H. Mahon	Democratic	1934	Incumbent re-elected.	▌ ✓ George H. Mahon (Democratic); Uncontested
Texas 20	Maury Maverick	Democratic	1934	Incumbent re-elected.	▌ ✓ Maury Maverick (Democratic) 71.6%; ▌E. W. Clemens (Republican) 25.0%; ▌James O. Rail (Independent) 3.4%
Texas 21	Charles L. South	Democratic	1934	Incumbent re-elected.	▌ ✓ Charles L. South (Democratic) 88.6%; ▌Max J. Bierschwale (Republican) 11.4%

== Utah ==
District	Incumbent			This race	
District	Member	Party	First elected	Results	Candidates
Utah 1	Abe Murdock	Democratic	1932	Incumbent re-elected.	▌ ✓ Abe Murdock (Democratic) 69.2%; ▌Charles W. Dunn (Republican) 30.6%; ▌William J. McConnell (Socialist) 0.2%
Utah 2	J. W. Robinson	Democratic	1932	Incumbent re-elected.	▌ ✓ J. W. Robinson (Democratic) 69.8%; ▌A. V. Watkins (Republican) 30.0%; ▌Joseph Hansen (Socialist) 0.3%

== Vermont ==
District	Incumbent			This race	
District	Member	Party	First elected	Results	Candidates
Vermont at-large	Charles Albert Plumley	Republican	1934	Incumbent re-elected.	▌ ✓ Charles Albert Plumley (Republican) 59.2%; ▌John B. Candon (Democratic) 40.1%; ▌Carl A. Melen (Communist) 0.6%

== Virginia ==
District	Incumbent			This race	
District	Member	Party	First elected	Results	Candidates
Virginia 1	S. Otis Bland	Democratic	1918	Incumbent re-elected.	▌ ✓ S. Otis Bland (Democratic) 80.9%; ▌William A. Dickinson (Republican) 18.6%; ▌Addison Gayle (Independent) 0.6%
Virginia 2	Colgate Darden	Democratic	1932	Incumbent lost renomination. Democratic hold.	▌ ✓ Norman R. Hamilton (Democratic) 88.7%; ▌Gerould M. Rumble (Republican) 10.0%; ▌Alexander Wright (Communist) 1.4%
Virginia 3	Jack Montague	Democratic	1912	Incumbent re-elected.	▌ ✓ Jack Montague (Democratic) 84.5%; ▌Charles G. Wilson (Republican) 14.5%; ▌Winston Dawson (Independent) 1.0%
Virginia 4	Patrick H. Drewry	Democratic	1920	Incumbent re-elected.	▌ ✓ Patrick H. Drewry (Democratic) 90.3%; ▌John Martin (Republican) 8.5%; ▌Daniel Killinger (Independent) 1.2%
Virginia 5	Thomas G. Burch	Democratic	1930	Incumbent re-elected.	▌ ✓ Thomas G. Burch (Democratic) 65.0%; ▌Taylor G. Vaughan (Republican) 35.0%
Virginia 6	Clifton A. Woodrum	Democratic	1922	Incumbent re-elected.	▌ ✓ Clifton A. Woodrum (Democratic) 60.7%; ▌T. X. Parsons (Republican) 39.3%
Virginia 7	A. Willis Robertson	Democratic	1932	Incumbent re-elected.	▌ ✓ A. Willis Robertson (Democratic) 63.9%; ▌J. Everett Will (Republican) 35.6%; ▌Lester Ruffner (Socialist) 0.5%
Virginia 8	Howard W. Smith	Democratic	1930	Incumbent re-elected.	▌ ✓ Howard W. Smith (Democratic) 75.4%; ▌John Locke Green (Republican) 23.3%; ▌F. A. Shelton (Independent) 1.3%
Virginia 9	John W. Flannagan Jr.	Democratic	1930	Incumbent re-elected.	▌ ✓ John W. Flannagan Jr. (Democratic) 62.2%; ▌Luther E. Fuller (Republican) 37.8%

== Washington ==
District	Incumbent			This race	
District	Member	Party	First elected	Results	Candidates
Washington 1	Marion Zioncheck	Democratic	1932	Incumbent died. Democratic hold.	▌ ✓ Warren Magnuson (Democratic) 63.7%; ▌Frederick W. Wettrick (Republican) 36.0%; ▌John E. Shields (Christian) 0.3%
Washington 2	Monrad C. Wallgren	Democratic	1932	Incumbent re-elected.	▌ ✓ Monrad C. Wallgren (Democratic) 63.6%; ▌Payson Peterson (Republican) 36.1%; ▌Fred C. Widmer (Christian) 0.3%
Washington 3	Martin F. Smith	Democratic	1932	Incumbent re-elected.	▌ ✓ Martin F. Smith (Democratic) 72.0%; ▌Herbert H. Sieler (Republican) 27.6%; ▌Orville W. Roundtree (Christian) 0.5%
Washington 4	Knute Hill	Democratic	1932	Incumbent re-elected.	▌ ✓ Knute Hill (Democratic) 57.9%; ▌John W. Summers (Republican) 42.0%; ▌Frank H. Tousley (Christian) 0.09%
Washington 5	Samuel B. Hill	Democratic	1923 (special)	Incumbent resigned to become member of the U.S. Board of Tax Appeals. Democratic hold.	▌ ✓ Charles H. Leavy (Democratic) 70.8%; ▌Warren O. Dow (Republican) 29.1%; ▌Walter L. Morgan (Christian) 0.2%
Washington 6	Wesley Lloyd	Democratic	1932	Incumbent died. Democratic hold.	▌ ✓ John M. Coffee (Democratic) 67.3%; ▌Paul A. Preus (Republican) 32.2%; ▌W. F. Jurisch (Christian) 0.4%

== West Virginia ==
District	Incumbent			This race	
District	Member	Party	First elected	Results	Candidates
West Virginia 1	Robert L. Ramsay	Democratic	1932	Incumbent re-elected.	▌ ✓ Robert L. Ramsay (Democratic) 59.8%; ▌Charles J. Schuck (Republican) 40.1%; ▌H. Wayne Carpenter (Prohibition) 0.1%
West Virginia 2	Jennings Randolph	Democratic	1932	Incumbent re-elected.	▌ ✓ Jennings Randolph (Democratic) 59.8%; ▌C. S. Musser (Republican) 40.1%; ▌George A. Herring (Prohibition) 0.07%
West Virginia 3	Andrew Edmiston Jr.	Democratic	1933 (special)	Incumbent re-elected.	▌ ✓ Andrew Edmiston Jr. (Democratic) 59.3%; ▌John M. Wolverton (Republican) 40.7%
West Virginia 4	George W. Johnson	Democratic	1932	Incumbent re-elected.	▌ ✓ George W. Johnson (Democratic) 53.5%; ▌Raymond V. Humphreys (Republican) 46.5%
West Virginia 5	John Kee	Democratic	1932	Incumbent re-elected.	▌ ✓ John Kee (Democratic) 64.5%; ▌C. M. Jones (Republican) 35.5%
West Virginia 6	Joe L. Smith	Democratic	1928	Incumbent re-elected.	▌ ✓ Joe L. Smith (Democratic) 63.9%; ▌M. F. Matheny (Republican) 36.1%

== Wisconsin ==
District	Incumbent			This race	
District	Member	Party	First elected	Results	Candidates
Wisconsin 1	Thomas Ryum Amlie	Progressive	1934	Incumbent re-elected.	▌ ✓ Thomas Ryum Amlie (Progressive) 52.5%; ▌Paul E. Jorgenson (Republican) 47.5%
Wisconsin 2	Harry Sauthoff	Progressive	1934	Incumbent re-elected.	▌ ✓ Harry Sauthoff (Progressive) 62.6%; ▌Frank R. Bentley (Republican) 37.4%
Wisconsin 3	Gardner R. Withrow	Progressive	1920	Incumbent re-elected.	▌ ✓ Gardner R. Withrow (Progressive) 59.2%; ▌J. Charles Pile (Republican) 40.8%
Wisconsin 4	Raymond J. Cannon	Democratic	1932	Incumbent re-elected.	▌ ✓ Raymond J. Cannon (Democratic) 60.2%; ▌Paul Gauer (Progressive) 39.8%
Wisconsin 5	Thomas O'Malley	Democratic	1932	Incumbent re-elected.	▌ ✓ Thomas O'Malley (Democratic) 54.6%; ▌Carl P. Dietz (Progressive) 45.4%
Wisconsin 6	Michael Reilly	Democratic	1930	Incumbent re-elected.	▌ ✓ Michael Reilly (Democratic) 51.7%; ▌Frank B. Keefe (Republican) 48.3%
Wisconsin 7	Gerald J. Boileau	Progressive	1930	Incumbent re-elected.	▌ ✓ Gerald J. Boileau (Progressive) 61.4%; ▌Arthur W. Prehm (Democratic) 38.6%
Wisconsin 8	George J. Schneider	Progressive	1934	Incumbent re-elected.	▌ ✓ George J. Schneider (Progressive) 50.4%; ▌John E. Cashman (Democratic) 49.6%
Wisconsin 9	Merlin Hull	Progressive	1934	Incumbent re-elected.	▌ ✓ Merlin Hull (Progressive) 80.7%; ▌Edwin J. Larkin (Democratic) 19.3%
Wisconsin 10	Bernard J. Gehrmann	Progressive	1934	Incumbent re-elected.	▌ ✓ Bernard J. Gehrmann (Progressive) 61.9%; ▌Philip E. Nelson (Republican) 38.1%

== Wyoming ==
District	Incumbent			This race	
District	Member	Party	First elected	Results	Candidates
Wyoming at-large	Paul R. Greever	Democratic	1934	Incumbent re-elected.	▌ ✓ Paul R. Greever (Democratic) 57.2%; ▌Frank A. Barrett (Republican) 42.1%; ▌Clarence Eklund (Union) 0.7%; ▌Roy Hines (Communist) 0.09%

== Non-voting delegates ==
=== Alaska Territory ===
Alaska Territory elected its non-voting delegate September 8, 1936.

District	Incumbent			This race	
District	Member	Party	First elected	Results	Candidates
Alaska Territory at-large	Anthony Dimond	Democratic	1932	Incumbent re-elected.	▌ ✓ Anthony Dimond (Democratic) 72.6%; ▌Lester O. Gore (Republican) 27.4%

== See also ==
- 1936 United States elections
  - 1936 United States Senate elections
  - 1936 United States presidential election
- 74th United States Congress
- 75th United States Congress
