= 1932 United States House of Representatives elections in South Carolina =

The 1932 United States House of Representatives elections in South Carolina were held on November 8, 1932, to select six representatives for two-year terms from the state of South Carolina. The state lost a seat from redistricting that occurred from the 1930 census. Four incumbents were re-elected and the two open seats were retained by the Democrats. The composition of the state delegation thus remained solely Democratic.

== 1st congressional district ==
Incumbent Democratic Congressman Thomas S. McMillan of the 1st congressional district, in office since 1925, defeated Republican challenger D.C. Sharpe.

=== General election results ===
South Carolina's 1st congressional district election results, 1932
Party	Candidate	Votes	%	±%
Democratic	Thomas S. McMillan (incumbent)	14,415	95.9	−4.1
Republican	D.C. Sharpe	616	4.1	+4.1
Majority		13,799	91.8	−8.2
Turnout		15,031		
Democratic hold				

== 2nd congressional district ==
Following the 1930 census, South Carolina lost a congressional district due to redistricting. The 2nd congressional district was split between the 1st congressional district and the old 7th congressional district. Incumbent Democratic Congressmen Butler B. Hare and Hampton P. Fulmer were placed in the same district and Hare opted to retire rather than run against Fulmer in the newly constituted 2nd congressional district. Fulmer defeated Asbury Francis Lever in the Democratic primary and Republican challenger D.A. Gardner in the general election.

=== Democratic primary ===
Democratic primary
Candidate	Votes	%
Hampton P. Fulmer	27,559	54.7
Asbury Francis Lever	22,847	45.3

=== General election results ===
South Carolina's 2nd congressional district election results, 1932
Party	Candidate	Votes	%	±%
Democratic	Hampton P. Fulmer (incumbent)	18,699	97.9	−2.1
Republican	D.A. Gardner	401	2.1	+2.1
Majority		18,298	95.8	−4.2
Turnout		19,100		
Democratic hold				

== 3rd congressional district ==
Incumbent Democratic Congressman Frederick H. Dominick of the 3rd congressional district, in office since 1917, was defeated in the Democratic primary by John C. Taylor. He defeated Republican challenger T. Frank McCord in the general election.

=== Democratic primary ===
Democratic primary
Candidate	Votes	%
John C. Taylor	32,265	55.2
Frederick H. Dominick	21,018	36.0
D.A.G. Outzts	5,166	8.8

=== General election results ===
South Carolina's 3rd congressional district election results, 1932
Party	Candidate	Votes	%	±%
Democratic	John C. Taylor	19,286	99.2	−0.8
Republican	T. Frank McCord	159	0.8	+0.8
Majority		19,127	98.4	−1.6
Turnout		19,445		
Democratic hold				

== 4th congressional district ==
Incumbent Democratic Congressman John J. McSwain of the 4th congressional district, in office since 1921, defeated Fred T. McCullough in the Democratic primary and Republican Otho Williams in the general election.

=== Democratic primary ===
Democratic primary
Candidate	Votes	%
John J. McSwain	43,832	81.1
Fred T. McCullough	10,247	18.9

=== General election results ===
South Carolina's 4th congressional district election results, 1932
Party	Candidate	Votes	%	±%
Democratic	John J. McSwain (incumbent)	23,041	98.4	−1.6
Republican	Otho Williams	382	1.6	+1.6
Majority		22,659	96.8	−3.2
Turnout		23,423		
Democratic hold				

== 5th congressional district ==
Incumbent Democratic Congressman William F. Stevenson of the 5th congressional district, in office since 1917, was defeated in the Democratic primary by James P. Richards. He defeated Republican challenger G.M. Williams in the general election.

=== Democratic primary ===
Democratic primary
Candidate	Votes	%
James P. Richards	22,485	62.4
William F. Stevenson	13,530	37.6

=== General election results ===
South Carolina's 5th congressional district election results, 1932
Party	Candidate	Votes	%	±%
Democratic	James P. Richards	15,046	98.5	−1.5
Republican	G.M. Williams	235	1.5	+1.5
Majority		14,811	97.0	−3.0
Turnout		15,281		
Democratic hold				

== 6th congressional district ==
Incumbent Democratic Congressman Allard H. Gasque of the 6th congressional district, in office since 1923, defeated E.S.C. Baker in the Democratic primary and Republican C.B. Ruffin in the general election.

=== Democratic primary ===
Democratic primary
Candidate	Votes	%
Allard H. Gasque	28,318	61.7
E.S.C. Baker	17,549	38.3

=== General election results ===
South Carolina's 6th congressional district election results, 1932
Party	Candidate	Votes	%	±%
Democratic	Allard H. Gasque (incumbent)	14,159	98.6	−1.4
Republican	C.B. Ruffin	194	1.4	+1.4
Majority		13,965	97.2	
Turnout		14,353		
Democratic hold				

== See also ==
- United States House of Representatives elections, 1932
- South Carolina's congressional districts
