= The Compendium of American Genealogy =

Genealogical book series

The Compendium of American Genealogy, First Families of America
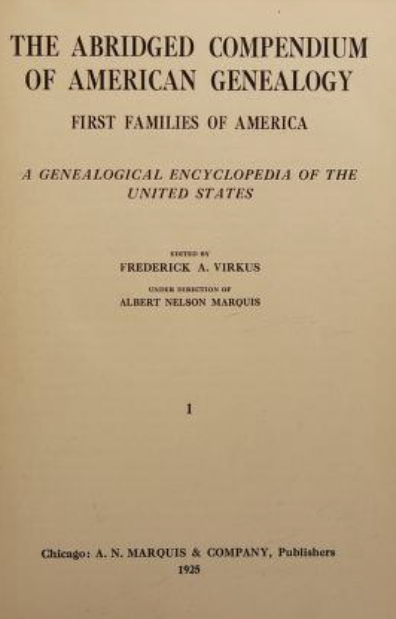
- Author: Frederick A. Virkus
- Language: English
- Genre: Genealogical reference
- Publisher: A.N. Marquis and Company
- Publication date: 7 volumes: 1925–1942
- Publication place: United States
- Media type: Print (Hardback, Paperback [2001]), CD-ROM
- Pages: 6,283
- ISBN: 978-0-8063-1171-5

The Compendium of American Genealogy, First Families of America (1925–1942), by Frederick Adams Virkus, is a seven volume collection of American lineage records intended as a standard genealogical history of the United States. The records span eight or nine generations from the early 17th century to the mid-20th. Originally a project of Marquis's Who's Who in America, it was later taken over by Virkus's own Institute of American Genealogy. Virkus guided the publication of the Compendium for more than two decades with the intention of producing a genealogical encyclopedia of the “first families of America”. It is a major source of information on immigrants to America before 1750. According to Tyler's Quarterly “practically every name distinguished in the early history of the country will be found within its pages”.

== Contents ==
The Compendium includes the lineage records of the earliest European families settling in the portion of North America that later became the United States. The records extend in both the male and female lines from the earliest-known immigrant ancestor to the then (1925-1942) living subject of the record. According to the first United States Census (1790), there were about 650,000 families living in the then new country. These were the families of “colonial or Revolutionary stock” who were of interest to Virkus as “America's First Families”. Virkus did not claim that all such families were represented, but placed emphasis on names “distinguished in any way” in the early history of the country. The Compendium contains more than 54,000 lineage records, with indexes listing almost 425,000 names, making it a standard reference and research source on American genealogy.

== Method ==
The Compendium was compiled largely from manuscript genealogies and other lineage records submitted by individuals selected by Virkus for inclusion. In some cases, photographs, portraits, and coats of arms were also included. Virkus then fact checked and edited the submissions. Each submitter reviewed his or her material in proof form before publication. The supporting files and documents for the Compendium were once housed in the Peabody Library, Johns Hopkins University, Baltimore, Maryland, but are now part of the Manuscript Collection of the Daughters of the American Revolution (DAR) Library, in Washington, D.C.1

Early volumes of the set were titled Abridged Compendium of American Genealogy, but Abridged was dropped from the title beginning with the fourth volume. In the preface to that volume, the editor wrote "[T]he gradual change in the treatment of the subject matter from the rigid abridgment in the first volume to fuller and fuller data in each succeeding volume, will be apparent.... [T]he change has become so marked in the present volume that the work is no longer the abridgment originally planned. Therefore, the strictly qualifying term 'Abridged' has been eliminated from its title."
