= Asahel Nettleton =

American theologian (1783–1844)

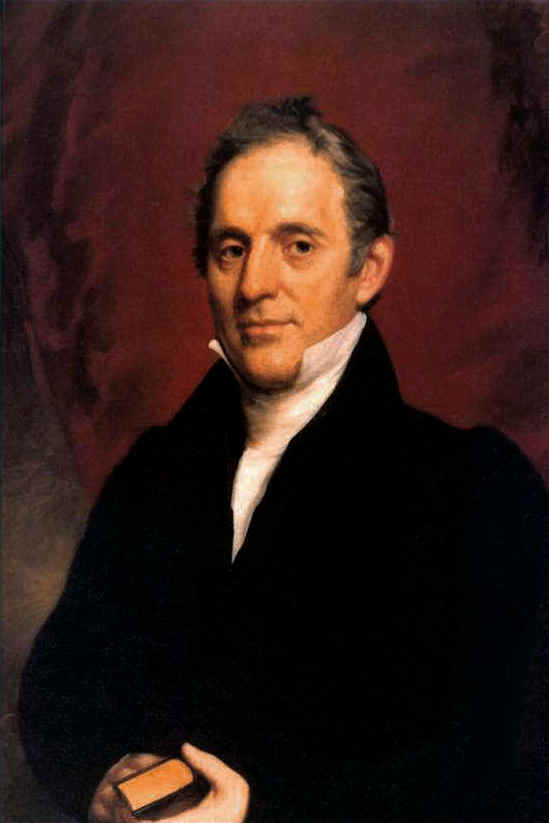
Asahel Nettleton

Asahel Nettleton (April 21, 1783 – May 16, 1844) was an American theologian and Evangelist from Connecticut who was highly influential during the Second Great Awakening. The number of people converted to Christianity as a result of his ministry was estimated by one biographer at 30,000. He participated in the New Lebanon Conference in 1827, during which he and Lyman Beecher opposed the teachings of Charles Grandison Finney.

== Early years ==
Nettleton was born 1783 into a farming family in Connecticut. During his early years, he occasionally experienced religious impressions. "One evening while standing alone in a field, he watched the sun go down. The approaching night reminded him that his own life would some day fade into the darkness of the world beyond. He suddenly realized that he, like all other people, would die." These impressions were only temporary.

In the autumn of 1800 Nettleton came under powerful conviction of sin. This conviction deepened as he began to read the writings and sermons of Jonathan Edwards, but yet he remained unconverted. It was in 1801 that a revival came to North Killingworth, and by December of that year, 32 new converts were added to the Church; by March 1802 "the congregation had been swelled by ninety-one professions." Among them was Nettleton, who, becoming "exceedingly interested" in mission societies, soon had "a strong desire to become a missionary to the heathen."

He attended Yale College from 1805 until his graduation in 1809 and was ordained to the ministry in 1811.

== Career ==
Nettleton led many Congregationalist revivals in New England in the first decade of his ministry. Operating in contrast to many modern evangelists, he would often move into a community for several weeks or months and study the spiritual condition of the people before attempting any revival work. His preaching was said to be largely doctrinal but always practical. Nettleton often filled the pulpits of churches where there was no pastor present. This allowed him to engage in pastoral care for the people. This practice is typically absent in modern evangelists' ministries. He also refused to preach in any community where he had not been invited. He witnessed early in ministry the problems that can result from a pastor who feels as though he is competing with an evangelist. He also would sometimes refuse to preach in a church if he believed the request was not sincere. He rejected the idea that he was the cause of any revival and shunned those who looked to him rather than God to bring revival to their community.

During these early days of his career, in 1813, he is believed to have written the music for the gospel song eventually to be called "I'm a Soldier Bound for Glory" (music by Asahel Nettleton 1813, words by William R. Phillips 1922), a hymn in the Songbook of the Salvation Army.

Beginning in 1821, and frequently for the remainder of his life, health problems limited Nettleton's travels and ministry. During one of those periods he compiled and edited "Village Hymns for Social Worship," a popular hymnal in New England for many decades.

In 1826, he became alarmed by the "new measures" being employed by many Presbyterian ministers in western New York state, especially by Charles Grandison Finney. Nettleton's theology was distinctly Reformed. He believed that salvation was a work of God alone and therefore rejected Finney's practice of giving altar calls during church services and revival meetings. The introduction of the altar call, Nettleton believed, exemplified a denial of the doctrines of original sin and total depravity.

He became Finney's most vocal critic and was the driving force behind the New Lebanon Conference in July, 1827, in which he, Lyman Beecher, and other more conservative ministers attempted to persuade Finney and his allies to change their methods. The conference essentially ended in a stand off, and Finney's approach to evangelism became increasingly popular among Presbyterians and Congregationalists, to Nettleton's frustration.

== Legacy ==
Nettleton mentored many young ministers, including James Brainerd Taylor (1801–1829), the Connecticut-born Second Great Awakening evangelist and primary founder of Princeton University's Philadelphian Society of Nassau Hall (1825–1930, spiritual parent of the Princeton Christian Fellowship).

Although the means and theology of Charles Grandison Finney were to have a greater impact on the history of American evangelism, Bennet Tyler wrote of the effects of revivals of which Nettleton was the instrument:

- (1) Re-established Calvinism. Calvinism seen as thoroughly evangelical.
- (2) Impact on society: revivals had a good name.
- (3) “Fruits of these revivals were permanent. They were not temporary excitements. . .”; “there were but few apostasies.”

Another historian has written of the effects of the Second Great Awakening as a whole (although not specifically of Nettleton): "Could Thomas Paine, the free-thinking pamphleteer of the American and French Revolutions, have visited Broadway in 1865, he would have been amazed to find that the nation conceived in rational liberty was 'in the grip of' the power of evangelical faith. The emancipating glory of the great awakenings had made Christian liberty, Christian equality and Christian fraternity the passion of the land. The treasured gospel…passed into the hands of the baptized many. Common grace, not common sense, was the keynote of the age… Religious doctrines which Paine, in his book The Age of Reason, had discarded as the “tattered vestment” of the past, became the wedding garment of many."

== See also ==
- James Brainerd Taylor (1801–1829), mentored by Nettleton, cousin of David Brainerd (1718–1747); born Middle Haddam, Connecticut; buried in Hampden-Sydney College Church cemetery, Virginia; obelisk in Union Hill Cemetery, Middle Haddam, Connecticut, and Princeton Cemetery of Nassau Presbyterian Church, Princeton, New Jersey; Lawrenceville School (N.J), Princeton University and Yale Divinity School-educated Second Great Awakening evangelist; primary founder of Princeton University's Philadelphian Society of Nassau Hall (1825–1930, now called Princeton Evangelical Fellowship); one of some 20,000 Americans listed in Appletons' Cyclopedia of American Biography (6 vol., 1887–89). See John Holt Rice and Benjamin Holt Rice, Memoir of James Brainerd Taylor, Second Edition (American Tract Society, 1833, online edition) and Fitch W. Taylor, A New Tribute to the Memory of James Brainerd Taylor (John S. Taylor [no relation], 1838, online edition). And I. Francis Kyle III, An Uncommon Christian: James Brainerd Taylor, Forgotten Evangelist in America's Second Great Awakening (University Press of America, 2008, Foreword by John F. Thornbury, contains the appendix "David Brainerd and James Brainerd Taylor: A Comparative Chart"), Of Intense Brightness: The Spirituality of Uncommon Christian James Brainerd Taylor (University Press of America, 2008, Foreword by James M Houston, Epilogue by Peter Adam), God's Co-worker: 21st-century Evangelism with Uncommon Christian James Brainerd Taylor (forthcoming, published doctoral dissertation), Nearer Access to God: 100 Days with Uncommon Christian James Brainerd Taylor (forthcoming) and Uncommon Christian Ministries' online biographical sketch and timeline on Taylor (http://www.UncommonChristian.com or Francis Kyle Pastor - Home).
