= John Brainerd (missionary) =

American Presbyterian missionary (1720–1781)

John Brainerd (February 28, 1720 – March 1781) was a Presbyterian minister who served as a reverend and a missionary to the Native Americans in New Jersey and New York before, during and after the American Revolutionary War. His missionary duties also took him to various White settlements in these areas. While conducting his missionary duties at Mount Holly, in New Jersey, he was subjected to many hardships and incursions at the hand of British and Hessian troops. Brainered also served on the board of Trustees at the College of New Jersey. The Brainerd brother's life and acclaimed missionary efforts among the various Indian nations during the revolutionary era have been heralded and so written about by clerical family members, including Reverend Thomas Brainerd, and prominent colonial preachers including John Wesley, founder of the Methodist Church, and Jonathan Edwards.

== Early life and family ==
John Brainerd was born on February 28, 1720, in Haddam, Connecticut, to Hezekiah and Dorothy (Mason) Brainerd, both of whom were devout Puritans. John was the youngest of six brothers, including David Brainerd, the famed missionary to the Indian nations in New Jersey to whom John was very close as brothers and in Christian fellowship.John graduated Yale University in 1746. No known surviving record of his college life and standing are extant. John had enrolled at Yale in 1742, the same year that his older brother David, then a junior, was expelled from the school for a critical comment he made about a teacher. The entire affair greatly affected the Brainerd family, and deeply saddened, causing great embarrassment for John. Upon learning of the incident John Wesley, founder of the Methodist church in America, thought David's termination at the college unjustified and extreme. In his biography, The Life of David Brainerd, he defended David and made the critical comment "Do those college authorities call themselves Christians?"

Brainerd's grandfather, Daniel Brainerd, emigrated from Exeter, England, in 1649, with the Wyllis family and settled in Hartford, Connecticut. Daniel married Hannah Spencer in 1664 and had eight children. The youngest son, Hezekiah, was the father of David and John Brainerd. With a party of about seven men went thirty miles below Hartford, and selected a tract of land twelve miles square on each side of the Connecticut River. They chose the name of Haddam for their new settlement, (Note: The name of Haddam, comes from the English villages of Much Hadham and Little Hadham in Hertfordshire, England.) where Daniel built his home about two miles above the present village of Haddam;

Brainerd was married twice; his first wife, Experience Lyon, of New Haven, died in 1757, while John was serving with the Colonial Army. Their marriage produced two children who died in their first year. In 1764 he remarried Elizabeth Price of Philadelphia, who gave him a daughter. Because of Brainered's busy schedule during an unstable time in the midst of war, she lived alternatively at Mount Holly or with her relatives in Philadelphia. Brainerd's only daughter, Mary, was married on July 8, 1788 to Major John Ross (1752–1796), born in Mount Holly, who served in the Continental Army, beginning in 1776. (Note: Ross died on September 7, 1796, in his hometown of Mount Holly, at the age of 44, and was buried in Mount Holly, Burlington, New Jersey. He was one of the original members of the Society of the Cincinnati in New Jersey, admitted 1783. Ross was appointed Collector of Revenue of Burlington County, New Jersey in 1792, by President Washington)

== Missionary life ==
After graduating from Yale College, Brainerd was ordained as a Presbyterian minister on April 15, 1747. He was immediately invited by his brother David, whose heath was in steady decline, to become the pastor of the prominent and wealthy parish in North Hampton, Massachusetts, arriving there on October 7, 1747, two days before his brother died there.

When Brainerd's brother, David, died of Tuberculosis (Note: WP Tuberculosis: "also known colloquially as the White death, or historically, as Consumption ") on October 9, 1747, John was compelled to assume his missionary duties among the Indian nations. Shortly thereafter two of his Yale friends and classmates, Elihu Spencer of Haddam, and Job Strong from Northampton, arrived to offer their assistance to John in his work at Bethel and among the six Indian nations in western New York. This included the nations of the Mohawk, Oneidas, Cayugas, among others

Brainerd ministered to about 160 Native Americans then living in a settlement called Bethel, (Note: Bethel is known today as Monroe Township, within Thompson Park, in Middlesex County.) His house was situated at Lower Mt. Bethel, in what was then called the Forks North. Brainered often donated significant amounts of his own money into his missionary involvements, and never received nor expected any reimbursement.

Fifty or more of the town's children had enrolled in the school that he established. To minister to other tribes in the greater area he would make long trips on horseback, using interpreters to teach the gospel. He encouraged them to move to the settlement in Bethel, where they could be under his pastoral care. Brainerd was also something of an itinerant preacher and established various “preaching points” where white settlers gathered to hear him preach. While laboring full-time among the Native Americans, John established seven churches for settlers and frequently visited seven other towns.

In 1757, upon the death of Reverend Aaron Burr Sr. (Note: Father of Aaron Burr, the traitor) president of The College of New Jersey, (Note: Since renamed as Princeton University) Jonathan Edwards received a request from the college's trustees to assume that position. Deeply divided between the prospect of being the college president and his call to his ministry, he sought the council and advice from ministers John Brainerd and Caleb Smith, who thought that John should accept the office. Still reluctant to make such a sudden change, Edwards nonetheless valued their advice and acquiesced to accepting the position. He became a trustee at the college in 1754; a position he retained until the year of his death. In 1758. At 34 years of age, Brainerd ultimately proved to be an influential delegate from the trustees that helped to secure Edwards' presidency to the college.

During the early stages of the American Revolutionary War, when the Colonial and British troops began to emerge in New Jersey in and around Brainerd's missionary involvements, he promptly offered his pastoral services and counseling that boosted the morale and spiritual well-being of the American soldiers and to the Indian nations under his care. On December 23, 1776, American militia forces were spotted by British scouts in and around Mount Holly, (Note: Mount Holly, also called Bridgetown (from 1768 to 1775)) some 20 miles (32 km) south-east of Princeton. British troops and their Hessian mercenaries attacked and captured Mount Holly and began raiding the homes, abusing some of the settlers and foraging for supplies. (Note: During the course of the war, Hessian soldiers in particular had a well documented reputation for cruelty, looting and other such immoral offenses.) Brainerd regarded the incursion as a merciless action and vociferously protested and made exclamations of patriotism, which further incited the troops into burning down his home and church.

At that point Brainered resolved that it was futile remaining at Mount Holly, while British and Hessians hostilities were still running high. As Brotherton was only 15 miles (24 km) away, he thought it best in retiring, until the hostilities passed. Subsequently, In 1777, at fifty-seven years of age, Brainerd moved from Brotherton to Deerfield Township, New Jersey, and presided over the church there, preaching to the Indians who attended his services. From 1778 to 1781, the Synod of New York and Philadelphia voted that ”the interest on the Indian fund be paid to Mr. Brainerd for his services among the Indians."

Rev. John Brainerd died at the age of 61 in Deerfield Township, in March 1781, where he was buried in the Deerfield Presbyterian Cemetery. His wife Elizabeth survived him by two years and died in 1783.

== See also ==
- Second Great Awakening — the period in which the Brainerd brothers served as missionaries
- Indigenous peoples of New Jersey
- Brainerd Mission – Christian mission to the Cherokee in present-day Chattanooga, Tennessee
- Brainerd missionay family
  David Brainerd (1718 – 1747)
  John Brainerd (missionary) (1720 – 1781)
  James Brainerd Taylor (1801–1829)
  Thomas Brainerd (1804- 1866)

== Bibliography ==
- Brainerd, Thomas (1865). The Life of John Brainerd, the brother of David Brainerd. Philadelphia : Presbyterian Publication Committee.
- Brainerd, Mary (1870). Life of Rev. Thomas Brainerd, D.D., for Thirty Years Pastor of Old Pine Street Church, Philadelphia. Philadelphia: J. B. Lippincott & Coyear.
- Edwards, Jonathan (1949). The Life and Diary of David Brainerd.
- Love, William DeLoss (1899). Samson Occom and the Christian Indians of New England. Boston ; Chicago : Pilgrim Press.
- Stryker, William Scudder (1898). The battles of Trenton and Princeton. Boston, New York, Houghton, Mifflin and company.
- Strong, James; McClintock, John (1981). "Brainerd, John". The Cyclopedia of Biblical, Theological, and Ecclesiastical Literature. Grand Rapids, Michigan: Baker Book House.
- Tomlinson, Mack (September 28, 2007). The Forgotten Brainerd: John. The Banner of Truth Trust.
- Styles, John (1820). The life of David Brainerd, missionary to the Indians, with an abridgment of his diary and journal. London: F. Westley.
- Verstraete, Susan (2007). "David and John Brainerd: Missionaries to Native". Christian Communications Worldwide.
- Wesley, John (1768). An extract of the life of the late Rev. Mr. David Brainerd, missionary to the Indians. Bristol : Printed by William Pine.
- "The Unsung Hero: John Brainerd the Revolutionary War Chaplain". Reformation Heritage Books. 2023.
- "My Story: Rev. John Brainerd, Cumberland County 1751-1781". New Jersey Council for the Social Studies. May 20, 2023.
- "Brainerd, John". Dartmouth Libraries, Essay. 2026.
- "Brigade Major John Ross". Society of the Cincinnati in the State of New Jersey.

Further reading

- Love, William DeLoss (1899). Samson Occom and the Christian Indians of New England. Boston: The Pilgrim Press.
- Raum, John O. (1877). The history of New Jersey : from its earliest settlement to the present time. Vol. II. Philadelphia: J.E. Potter and Co.
