= Daniel Sabin Butrick =

American missionary and activist (1789–1851)

Rev. Daniel Sabin Butrick
- Born: Daniel Sabin Butrick; August 25, 1789; Windsor, Massachusetts
- Died: June 8, 1851 (aged 61); Dwight Mission, Oklahoma, Indian Territory
- Other name: Daniel Sabin Buttrick
- Occupations: Minister, Cherokee Defender
- Known for: A.B.C.F.M missionary to the Cherokee Nation, 1817-1851
- Spouse: Elizabeth Proctor Butrick (1783–1847?)

Rev. Daniel Sabin Butrick (also Buttrick; August 25, 1789 – June 8, 1851) was an American Congregationalist missionary of the American Board of Commissioners for Foreign Missions (ABCFM) to the Cherokee Nation. Ordained at Park Street Church in Boston on September 3, 1817, he arrived at Brainerd Mission in January 1818 and served for more than three decades at stations including Brainerd, Carmel, Willstown, and Hightower, and later at Fairfield, Mount Zion, and Dwight Mission in Indian Territory. Butrick remained with the Cherokee after the Treaty of New Echota and, with his wife Elizabeth Proctor Butrick, obtained permission to travel west with the Richard Taylor detachment during the Trail of Tears of 1838–1839. The journal he kept from May 1838 to April 1839 is one of the few sustained eyewitness accounts of the roundup, internment, and forced march. In the same years he collaborated with John Howard Payne to record Cherokee history, ritual, and oral tradition; the resulting Payne-Butrick Papers are among the most detailed written sources on traditional Cherokee culture. His career was marked by strained relations with fellow missionaries and limited numerical success in conversion. He gave priority to pastoral work and ethnographic collecting rather than to organized political resistance against removal. That choice limited his public influence during the crisis, but it produced the writings on which his historical reputation rests.

== Indian Antiquities ==
Butrick wrote "Indian Antiquities" in response to the Indian Removal efforts that threatened his mission to the Cherokee Nation in the 1830s. His effort to prove that the ancestors of the Cherokee were the lost ten tribes of Israel became an obsession to correct, or at least to spotlight, the injustices which the natives suffered at the hands of the Americans. He interviewed informants and planned to have their perspectives published by his editor John Howard Payne (June 9, 1791 - April 10, 1852) on behalf of their nation.

Butrick's Evangelicalism drove him beyond the ethnocentrism of his fellows and into an obsession to demonstrate the Jewish ancestry of the Cherokee. He undertook the "Indian Antiquities" project as an expression of his faith that the Cherokee were heirs to the promises of the God of ancient Israel. He hoped that the Cherokees would find restoration in Jesus Christ amidst the forced relocation wrought upon them by the Americans. "Indian Antiquities" was Butrick's attempt to reconcile his theological tradition with Cherokee folkways as he sought to live out an Indian-centered worldview.

An abbreviated version of the "Indian Antiquities" manuscript (ca. 1840) is accessible by way of its posthumous publication, entitled Antiquities of the Cherokee Indians (1884). The 1884 edition was the product of Butrick's relationships with his Cherokee informants, particularly Thomas Nu:tsa:wi. These relationships bring attention to the role which Cherokee Christians played in the creation of the John Howard Payne Papers while offering insight into the complexities of Butrick's engagement with the Indians as he undertook his project. (Note: An "informant" is a general term to describe an individual who provided information (directly or indirectly) to another person on behalf of a research project. The term "antiquitarian" refers specifically to the elders of the Cherokee Nation who provided antiquities for Butrick's specific inquiries into their folkways.)

The "Indian Antiquities" manuscripts remained unpublished during Butrick's lifetime. Payne published some of Butrick's research in an article, "The Ancient Cherokee Traditions and Religious Rites" (1849).The editors of Payne-Butrick Papers speculated that Payne's article was intended "to drum up [public] interest in his project."

Butrick's collaboration with Payne concluded in the early 1840s. During this era, Butrick wrote with an emotional tone ranging from disillusionment and grief during the early 1840s (after the Trail of Tears) to a feeling of hopeful optimism that he had gained shortly before his death in 1851. The historian David James Tackett argued that Butrick began to realize his hoped-for restitution as he took to heart the encouragement of his wife (Elizabeth Proctor Butrick, 1783-1847?), forgave his brethren at the Brainerd Mission for their shortcomings, and attempted to revive his spiritual ministry among the Five Civilized Tribes.

== Manuscripts ==
"Indian Antiquities" refers specifically to the edited manuscript bearing that title in the John Howard Payne Papers of Chicago's Newberry Library. Payne undertook the difficult work of compiling and editing Butrick's "Indian Antiquities", although they were not published until 160 years later, when his successors issued them as The Payne-Butrick Papers (2010).

In 1849 Payne published an article on Butrick's "Indian Antiquities." In the introduction, Payne wrote, "It has cost us no brief study to discover what their first creed was." The size and scope of his source material on Indian folkways was certainly formidable to sort out. Concerning the task of publishing it, the editors of The Payne-Butrick Papers (2010) wrote, "Editing and annotating the Payne-Butrick manuscript has been an intellectually stimulating endeavor. It has also been challenging ... ."

Other documents in addition to the "Indian Antiquities" manuscript preserved Butrick's thoughts regarding the project. In the John Howard Payne Papers, Butrick's personal correspondence on "Indian Antiquities" are grouped as follows:

1. a first grouping of Butrick's letters, containing information about his research methodology and the character of his informants;
2. a second grouping of Butrick's letters, covering the difficulties he had citing and submitting his source material. These letters also detail Cherokee political affairs;
3. "Indian Antiquities" is the 125-page rough draft which Payne created from Butrick's source material. It contains Cherokee sayings and traditions;
4. "Notes on Cherokee Customs and Antiquities" is Payne's 104-page polished manuscript. It contains two chapters with multiple subsections.

Likewise, the Papers of the American Board of Commissioners for Foreign Missions in the Houghton Library archive contains a voluminous record of Butrick's theological and political thought in his " "Jews and Indians" manuscript, public and private journals, and correspondence with his mission board, the American Board of Commissioners for Foreign Missions. Of these thousands of pages of documents, the "Jews and Indians" manuscript was the key to unlocking the theological intention of "Indian Antiquities." It is likely that the ABCFM received it in the mid-to-late 1840s shortly after Butrick's collaboration with Payne concluded.

Two published works resulted from the Payne-Butrick collaboration. In 1849 Payne published an article about Cherokee antiquities in the Quarterly Register and Magazine, entitled "The Ancient Cherokee Traditions and Religious Rites." In 1884 an unnamed writer published Butrick's "Antiquities of the Cherokee Indians".

Twentieth-century author Thomas Mails's (1920–2001) observation about the ethnological material contained in "Indian Antiquities" provides a suitable transition into the importance of this topic. He believed that these materials:

are unique and of considerable length, and they are known to all who research Cherokee History. Virtually every published book on the tribe mentions the manuscript in one way or another and in particular refers to its material on ancient festivals as the most voluminous and worthwhile extant.

== Modern relevance ==
Most researchers of Cherokee history or traditions are familiar with Butrick's manuscripts and journals. Considering the many monographs that have contained Butrick's perspectives, it is ironic that he asked of John Howard Payne:

Please, let none of this manuscript go from your hands; and if you think it will, on the whole conduce to evil more than good, you will oblige me by burning the whole instead of publishing it. Let none of it be published in any newspaper, or periodical of any kind, but destroy it unless you wish it for your own work.

Butrick apparently did not appreciate the wealth of material his collaboration with Payne produced, nor the importance it would hold for future generations of academic researchers.

The Historian David James Tackett argued:

Daniel Butrick's "Indian Antiquities" contributes to the ongoing discussion about Cherokee Indians and Protestant missions by bringing attention to the intended meaning of his research. For two centuries the researchers who engaged the "Indian Antiquities" manuscript have valued the objective facts of its content, while dismissing the intentions of its author. Butrick's narrative was an expression of his love for his informants and the story of his interpersonal struggles with his compatriots, ABCFM missionaries, and Cherokee Indians.

Butrick collected the oral traditions of Thomas Nu:tsa:wi and other Cherokee informants and systematized their stories. By modern standards this material is shortsighted. He identified Indians as Jews. Nevertheless, many historians have appreciated "Indian Antiquities" for its facts concerning native culture. Others turned to it for its amalgamated Christian Cherokee narratives. The Historian David James Tackett argued that "Indian Antiquities" should also be valued for the preservation of Butrick's privileged perspective.

== See also ==
- Cherokee Nation
- American Board of Commissioners for Foreign Missions
- Brainerd Mission
- John Howard Payne
- Samuel Worcester
- Ten Tribes
- Israelites
- Evangelical Christian
- Mission (Christianity)
- Newberry Library
- Houghton Library
