= Ann Eliza Worcester Robertson =

American missionary and teacher

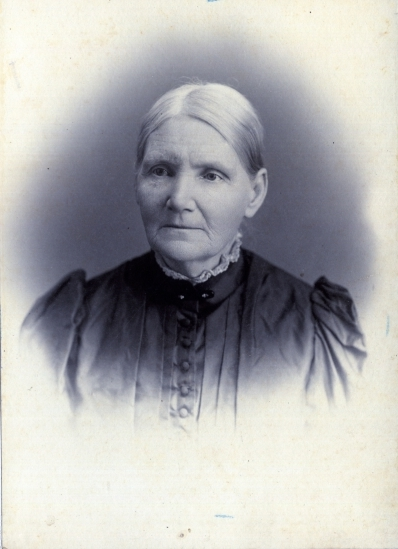
- Born: Ann Eliza Worcester; November 7, 1826; Brainerd Mission, Tennessee, U.S.
- Died: November 19, 1905 (aged 79); Muskogee, Indian Territory
- Occupations: Missionary and teacher
- Children: 3, including Alice Robertson
- Father: Samuel Worcester

Ann Eliza Worcester Robertson (November 7, 1826 – November 19, 1905) was an American linguist and Christian missionary. Her daughter was the activist and Congresswoman Alice Mary Robertson.

== Biography ==
Ann Eliza Worcester was born on November 7, 1826, in Brainerd Mission, Tennessee, to Samuel Worcester, a Christian missionary, and Ann Orr Worcester. At the time her father was performing missionary work to the Cherokee. The family followed the relocation of the Cherokee to modern-day Oklahoma, when Ann was nine years old, and Samuel continued his ministry work at Park Hill. Ann Eliza was educated at the mission (a predecessor of the Cherokee Female Seminary) before attending St. Johnsbury Academy, Vermont, living with an uncle. She returned to Park Hill in 1846 as a teacher assigned by the American Board of Commissioners for Foreign Missions.

On April 16, 1850, Worcester married William S. Robertson, also a teacher. The couple had three children, including Alice Mary Robertson, an activist and congresswoman. Ann Robertson eventually moved to teach at the Tullahassee Mission. While teaching she became proficient in the Muscogee language and translated the New Testament and substantial portions of the Old Testament. Robertson worked with her husband and others to produce several other translations.

In recognition of her linguistic work, Robertson received an honorary degree from Wooster College in 1892. She taught at Henry Kendall College and lived in Muskogee, Oklahoma. She had struggled with ill heath for much of her life and died on November 19, 1905.

== Translations ==
- (revised trans. with William Schenck Robertso) Cesvs Klist em Opunvkv-herv Maro coyvte = the Gospel according to Matthew : translated from the original Greek into the Muskokee language. New York: American Bible Society, 1875. Revised from earlier translation by R. M. Loughridge and D. Winslett.
- Mvskoke nettcako cokv-heckv cokv esyvhiketv : Yvhiketv "Punvkv-herv esyvhiketv" momet cokv eti aenkvpvket. The Muskokee S.S. song-book. From gospel songs and other collections. New York: American tract Society, 1880.
- (trans. with William Schenck Robertson) Pu pucase momet pu hesayecv Cesvs Klist en Testement Mucvsat. Klekvlke em punvkv mv ofv enhvteceskv cohoycte aossen tohtvlecicvhotet os. New York: American Bible Society, 1887.
- (trans. with J. Edwards) Cokv Esvkvsvmkv hepluvlke em punvkv enhvteceskv es cohoyvte tohtvlecihocet os: the Book of Psalms. New York: American Bible Society, 1896.
