= Dwight Mission, Oklahoma =

Dwight Mission
- CDP
- Location within the state of Oklahoma
- Coordinates: 35°33′26″N 94°51′04″W
- Country: United States
- State: Oklahoma
- County: Sequoyah

Area
  - Total: 4.85 sq mi (12.56 km^{2})
  - Land: 4.80 sq mi (12.43 km^{2})
  - Water: 0.054 sq mi (0.14 km^{2})
- Elevation: 600 ft (180 m)

Population (2020)
  - Total: 76
  - Density: 15.9/sq mi (6.12/km^{2})
- Time zone: UTC-6 (Central (CST))
  - Summer (DST): UTC-5 (CST)
- FIPS code: 40-22275
- GNIS feature ID: 2408698

Dwight Mission is a census-designated place (CDP) in Sequoyah County, Oklahoma, United States. It is part of the Fort Smith, Arkansas-Oklahoma Metropolitan Statistical Area. As of the 2020 census, Dwight Mission had a population of 76. It is currently the home of Dwight Mission Presbyterian Camp & Retreat Center.

== History ==
The original Dwight Mission was established in August 1820 on Illinois Bayou, near present-day Russellville, Arkansas, in the Cherokee settlements. It was named after Rev. Timothy Dwight, President of Yale University and an influential member of the American Board of Commissioners for Foreign Missions.

In 1828 the Western Cherokees were forced to move out of Arkansas into Indian Territory (present day Oklahoma). As a result of this move, Dwight Mission was reestablished on Sallisaw Creek, in Sequoyah County in the Marble City, Oklahoma area. The mission was sited about 12 miles (19 km) above the junction of Sallisaw Creek and the Arkansas River and thirty miles east of Fort Gibson.

Dwight Mission reopened in Indian Territory on Sallisaw Creek on May 1, 1830. The mission consisted of twenty-one houses, a large dining hall, a barn, and outbuildings.

A series of parochial and tribal schools existed on the site until 1948 (with the exception of the Civil War years when the site was abandoned) and 1884–1886).

In 1950, Presbyterian Church USA purchased the property. Since that time, Dwight Mission has served as a church camp and retreat center.

== Geography ==
According to the United States Census Bureau, the CDP has a total area of 1.8 square miles (4.7 km^{2}), of which 1.8 square miles (4.7 km^{2}) is land and 0.04 square miles (0.10 km^{2}) (1.09%) is water.

== Demographics ==
Historical population
Census	Pop.	Note	%±
2000	32		—
2010	55		71.9%
2020	76		38.2%
U.S. Decennial Census

=== 2020 census ===
As of the 2020 census, Dwight Mission had a population of 76. The median age was 46.7 years. 23.7% of residents were under the age of 18 and 31.6% of residents were 65 years of age or older. For every 100 females there were 145.2 males, and for every 100 females age 18 and over there were 123.1 males age 18 and over.

0.0% of residents lived in urban areas, while 100.0% lived in rural areas.

There were 33 households in Dwight Mission, of which 15.2% had children under the age of 18 living in them. Of all households, 60.6% were married-couple households, 9.1% were households with a male householder and no spouse or partner present, and 30.3% were households with a female householder and no spouse or partner present. About 27.3% of all households were made up of individuals and 15.2% had someone living alone who was 65 years of age or older.

There were 37 housing units, of which 10.8% were vacant. The homeowner vacancy rate was 0.0% and the rental vacancy rate was 0.0%.

Racial composition as of the 2020 census
Race	Number	Percent
White	28	36.8%
Black or African American	2	2.6%
American Indian and Alaska Native	26	34.2%
Asian	7	9.2%
Native Hawaiian and Other Pacific Islander	0	0.0%
Some other race	0	0.0%
Two or more races	13	17.1%
Hispanic or Latino (of any race)	3	3.9%

=== 2000 census ===
As of the census of 2000, there were 32 people, 12 households, and 8 families residing in the CDP. The population density was 17.6 inhabitants per square mile (6.8/km^{2}). There were 13 housing units at an average density of 7.1 per square mile (2.7/km^{2}). The racial makeup of the CDP was 68.75% White, 28.12% Native American, and 3.12% from two or more races.

There were 12 households, out of which 16.7% had children under the age of 18 living with them, 50.0% were married couples living together, 16.7% had a female householder with no husband present, and 33.3% were non-families. 25.0% of all households were made up of individuals, and 25.0% had someone living alone who was 65 years of age or older. The average household size was 2.67 and the average family size was 3.13.

In the CDP, the population was spread out, with 9.4% under the age of 18, 12.5% from 18 to 24, 28.1% from 25 to 44, 28.1% from 45 to 64, and 21.9% who were 65 years of age or older. The median age was 45 years. For every 100 females, there were 113.3 males. For every 100 females age 18 and over, there were 93.3 males.

The median income for a household in the CDP was $35,000, and the median income for a family was $29,000. Males had a median income of $18,750 versus $27,750 for females. The per capita income for the CDP was $15,170. None of the population and none of the families were below the poverty line.

== See also ==
- American Board of Commissioners for Foreign Missions
- Daniel Sabin Butrick
- Brainerd Mission
- Cherokee Nation
- Dwight Presbyterian Mission
- Samuel Worcester
