= William Wirt Hastings =

American politician

William W. Hastings
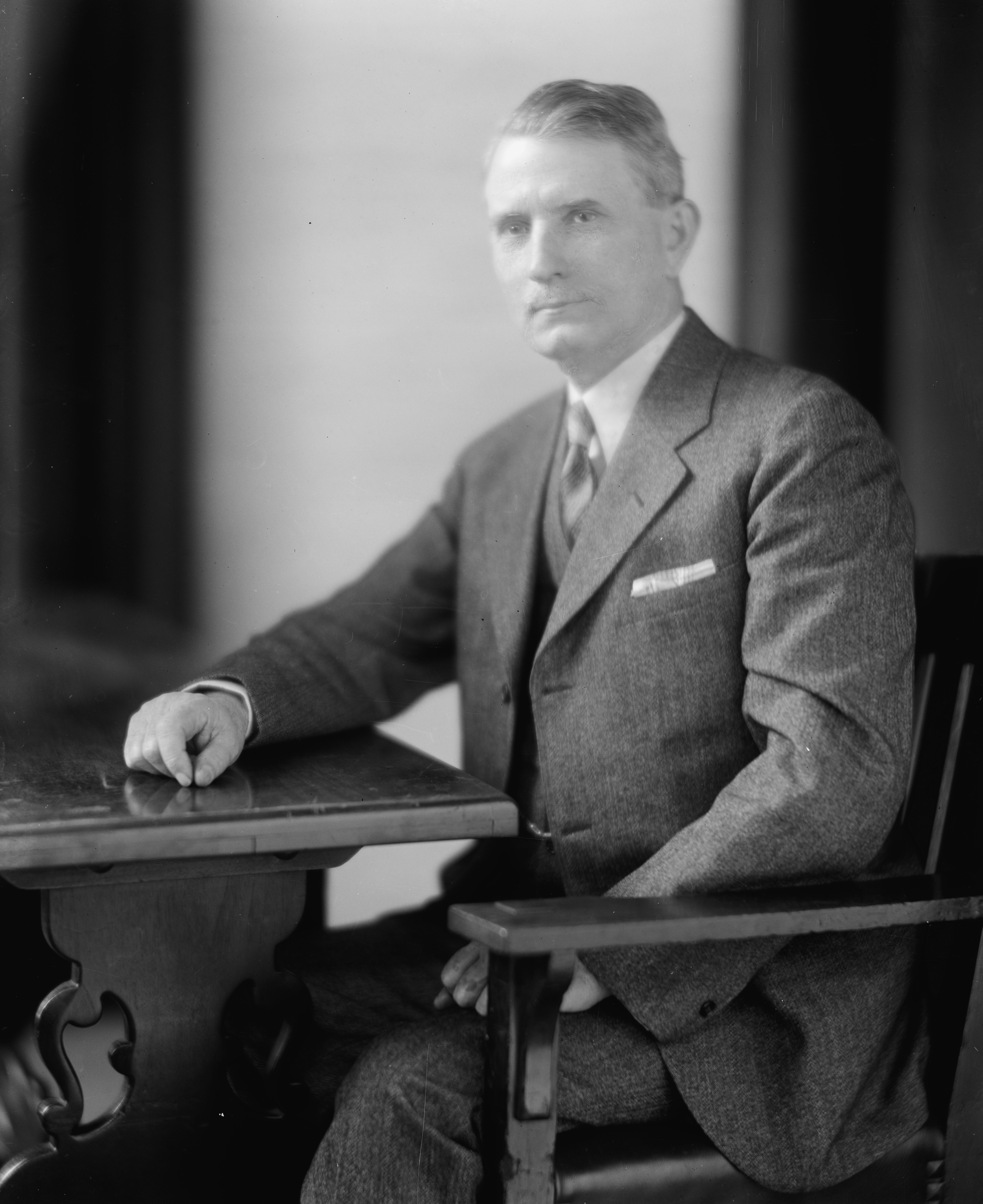

Member of the U.S. House of Representatives from Oklahoma's 2nd district
- In office March 4, 1923 – January 3, 1935
- Preceded by: Alice Robertson
- Succeeded by: John Nichols
- In office March 4, 1915 – March 3, 1921
- Preceded by: Dick Morgan
- Succeeded by: Alice Robertson

Personal details
- Born: William Wirt Hastings; December 31, 1866 Benton County, Arkansas, U.S.
- Died: April 8, 1938 (aged 71) Muskogee, Oklahoma, U.S.
- Resting place: City Cemetery, Tahlequah, Oklahoma
- Citizenship: American; Cherokee Nation
- Party: Democratic
- Spouse: Lula Mayfield Starr
- Children: 4
- Education: Cherokee Male Seminary; Vanderbilt University (LLB)

William Wirt Hastings (December 31, 1866 – April 8, 1938) was an American lawyer, educator and politician who served nine terms as a U.S. representative from Oklahoma between 1915 and 1935.

== Biography ==
Born on a farm in Benton County, Arkansas, near the Indian Territory boundary, Hastings was the son of William Archibald "Yell" and Louisa J. Stover Hastings, and moved with his parents to a farm at Beatties Prairie, Delaware County (then part of the Cherokee Nation in Indian Territory), Oklahoma, and attended the Cherokee tribal school. He graduated from Cherokee Male Seminary, at Tahlequah, in 1884. He was married to Lula Mayfield Starr on December 9, 1896, and they had four children, Grace, Lucile, Mayme, and Lillian.

== Career ==
Hastings was a teacher in the Cherokee tribal schools from 1884 to 1886. He graduated from the law department of Vanderbilt University, Nashville, Tennessee, in 1889. Admitted to the bar in the same year he began his practice in Tahlequah, Oklahoma. He was again a teacher in the tribal schools from 1889 to 1891. He served as Attorney general for the Cherokee Nation from 1891 to 1895, and as National attorney for the Cherokee tribe from 1907 to 1914. He served as delegate to the Democratic State convention in 1912, as well as delegate to the Democratic National Convention in 1912.

=== Congress ===
Elected as a Democrat to the Sixty-fourth, Sixty-fifth, and Sixty-sixth Congresses, Hastings served from March 4, 1915, to March 3, 1921. During that time, he served as chairman of the Committee on Expenditures in the Department of the Interior (Sixty-fifth Congress). He was an unsuccessful candidate for reelection in 1920 to the Sixty-seventh Congress, losing to Republican Alice Mary Robertson. This was the first time in history that an incumbent U.S. Congressman was defeated by a female candidate.

Hastings was elected to the Sixty-eighth and to the five succeeding Congresses and served from March 4, 1923, to January 3, 1935. Not a candidate for renomination in 1934, he resumed practicing law in Tahlequah, Oklahoma.

=== Later life ===
Through his efforts, Tahlequah had received an Indian hospital as a Christmas present in 1935. Hastings returned to public life briefly when he was appointed by President Franklin D. Roosevelt as a Cherokee Chief for one day to sign a new deed when an error was found in the old abstract.

== Death ==
Hastings died on April 8, 1938 (age 71 years, 98 days), in Muskogee, Oklahoma. He is interred in City Cemetery, Tahlequah, Oklahoma.

== See also ==
- List of Native Americans in the United States Congress

U.S. House of Representatives
Preceded by Dick Morgan	Member of the U.S. House of Representatives from Oklahoma's 2nd congressional district 1915–1921	Succeeded by Alice Robertson
Preceded by Tom Stout	Chair of the House Interior Expenditures Committee; 1917–1919	Succeeded by Aaron Shenk Kreider
Preceded by Alice Robertson	Member of the U.S. House of Representatives from Oklahoma's 2nd congressional district 1923–1935	Succeeded by John Nichols
