= Dwight Mission =

Dwight Mission may refer to:

- Dwight Mission, Oklahoma, a census-designated place
- Dwight Presbyterian Mission, an early mission to the Cherokee Nation
