= Alice Robertson =

American politician (1854–1931)

Alice Mary Robertson
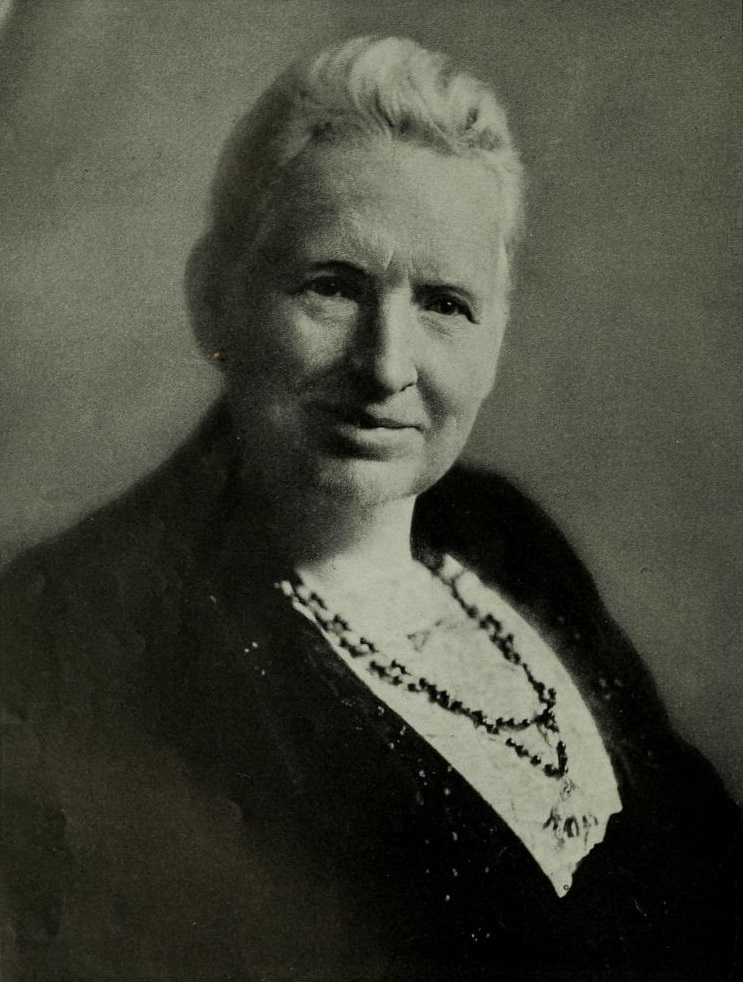

Member of the U.S. House of Representatives from Oklahoma's 2nd district
- In office March 4, 1921 – March 3, 1923
- Preceded by: William W. Hastings
- Succeeded by: William W. Hastings

Personal details
- Born: January 2, 1854 Tullahassee Mission, Muscogee Nation, Indian Territory
- Died: July 1, 1931 (aged 77) Muskogee, Oklahoma, U.S.
- Party: Republican
- Parent: Ann Eliza Worcester Robertson (mother)
- Relatives: Samuel Worcester (grandfather)
- Education: Elmira College
- Profession: Educator, public servant

Alice Mary Robertson (January 2, 1854 – July 1, 1931) was an American educator, social worker, Native Americans' rights activist, government official, and politician who became the second woman to serve in the United States Congress, and the first from the state of Oklahoma. Robertson was the first woman to defeat an incumbent congressman. She was known for her strong personality, commitment to Native American issues, and anti-feminist stance.

Until the election of Mary Fallin in 2006, Robertson was the only woman elected from Oklahoma to Congress.

== Education, teaching, and early public service ==
Robertson was born at the Tullahassee Mission in the Creek Nation, Indian Territory, to missionaries Ann Eliza (née Worcester) and William Schenck Robertson. Her maternal grandfather was Samuel Worcester, a long-time missionary to the Cherokees. The 1860 United States Census shows the family living in Creek Nation, Indian Lands, Arkansas. Her parents translated many works into the Creek language, including the Bible. In early life, Mary Alice Robertson was self-taught under the supervision of her parents. She attended Elmira College, in Elmira, New York.

== Career ==
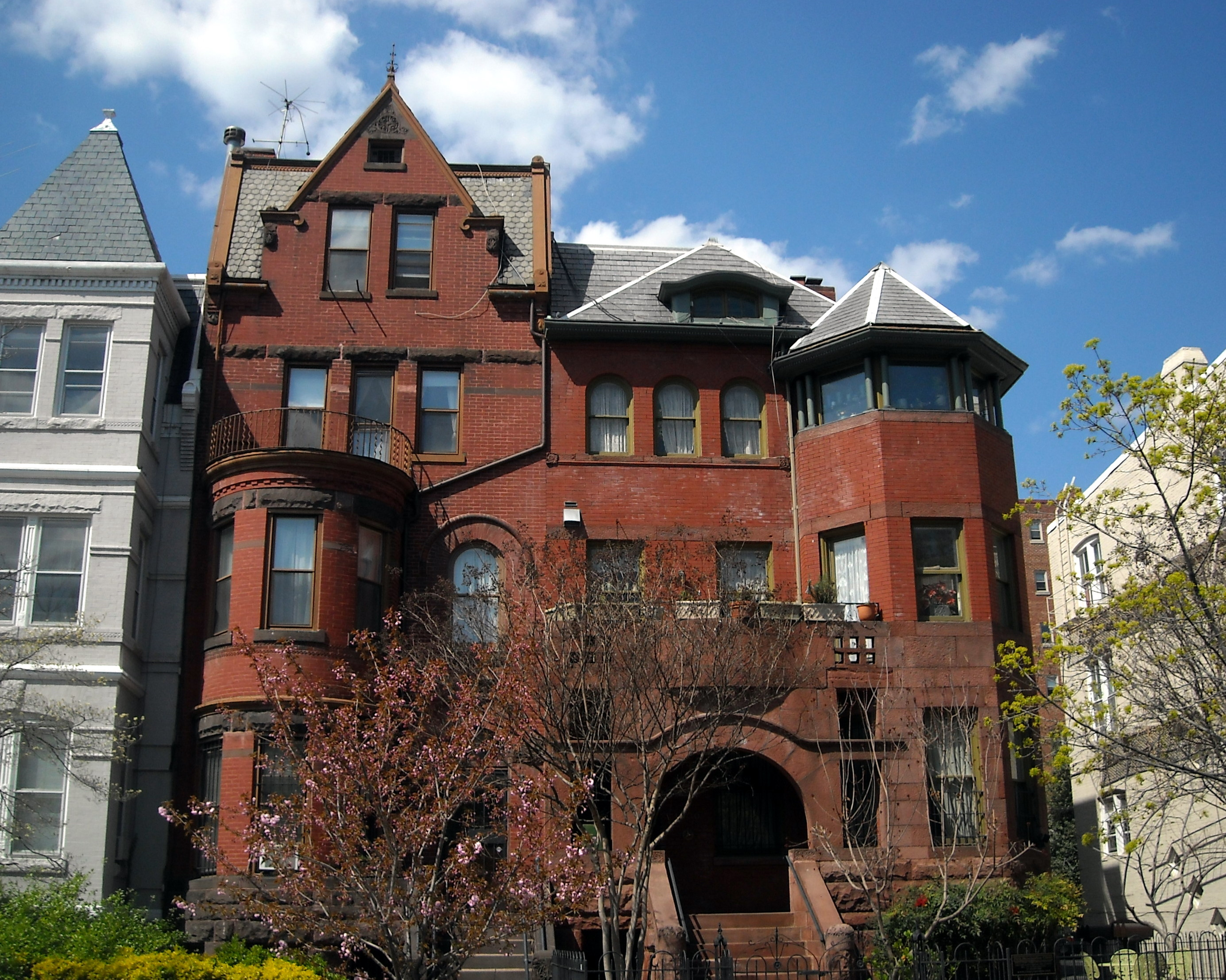
Robertson's former residence in the Dupont Circle neighborhood of Washington, D.C.

Robertson started working as a clerk in the Bureau of Indian Affairs (BIA) in Washington, D.C. (1873 to 1879). She returned to the Indian Territory and taught briefly in the school at Tullahassee. Later she taught at the Carlisle Indian Industrial School in Carlisle, Pennsylvania, from 1880 to 1882. It was the model for Indian boarding schools across the country.

Robertson returned to the Indian Territory, and established the Nuyaka Mission. It was run by Presbyterians who reported to the Creek Council. She taught in Okmulgee, Oklahoma, where she had charge of a Presbyterian boarding school for Native American girls. It eventually developed into Henry Kendall College and then the University of Tulsa.

Robertson was appointed by the BIA as the first government supervisor of Creek Indian schools, and she served from 1900 to 1905. She was next appointed by President Theodore Roosevelt as the United States postmaster of Muskogee, Oklahoma, serving from 1905 to 1913. She was the country's first woman postmaster of a Class A post office. During World War I, she provided a canteen service to local troops in what was the start of the Muskogee Chapter of the American Red Cross.

== Representative ==
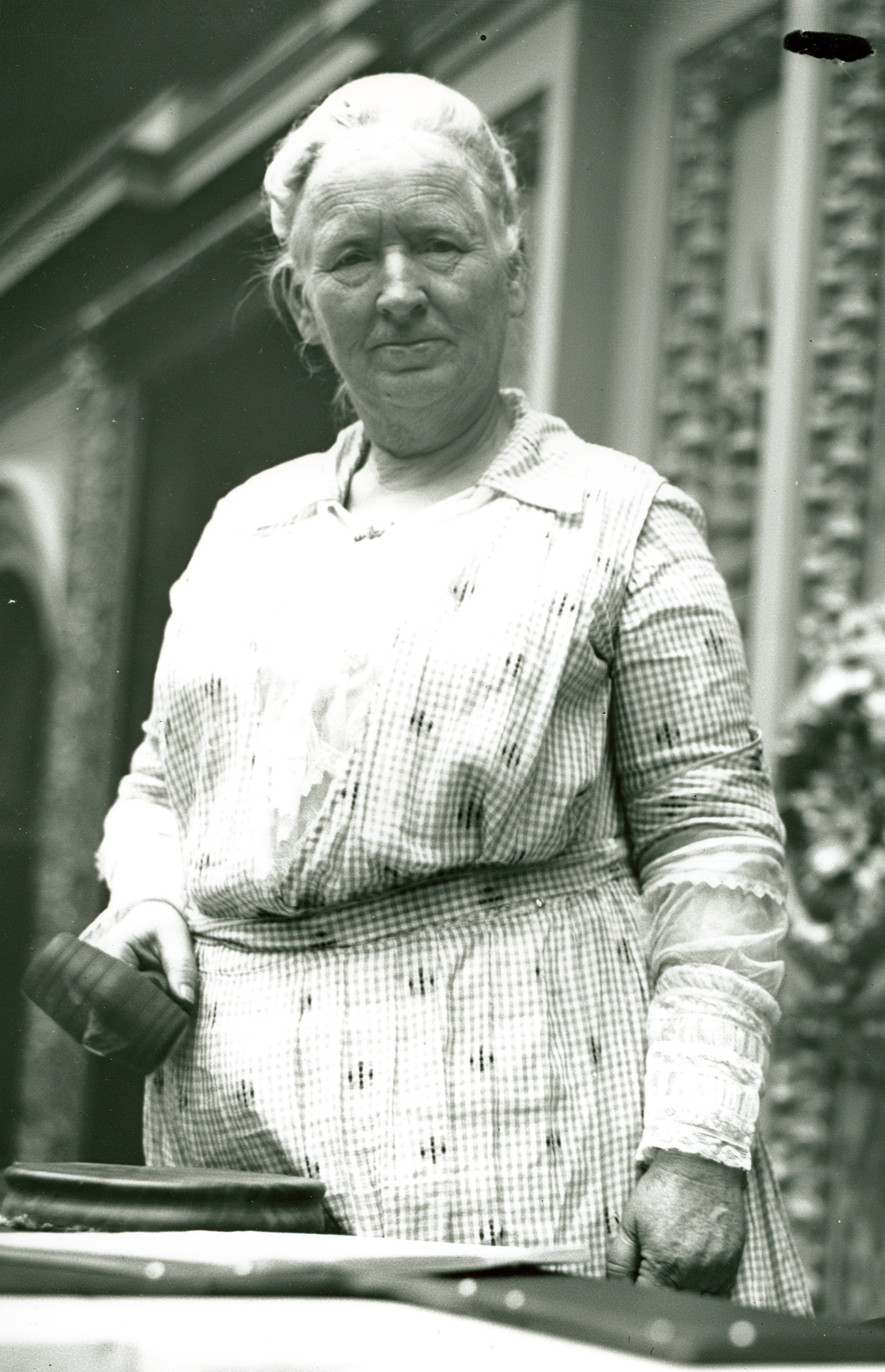
Robertson became the first woman to preside over the House chamber on June 20, 1921.

Robertson became more involved in politics. She was elected by the 2nd District of Oklahoma as a Republican Representative to the 67th Congress, narrowly defeating the incumbent William Hastings. She was the first woman to defeat an incumbent representative in a general election. She served from March 4, 1921, to March 3, 1923, but was unsuccessful in running for reelection in 1922 and was defeated by Hastings.

Robertson was the second woman to hold a seat in Congress, after Representative Jeannette Rankin from Montana, who served from 1917 to 1919. Before the expiration of her term, Rebecca Felton was appointed for one day to the Senate, and representatives Winnifred Huck from Illinois and Mae Nolan from California both won special elections; they were the third, fourth, and fifth women to serve in Congress. During her term, Robertson became the first woman to preside over the House of Representatives, on June 20, 1921.

Robertson was the first woman elected to Congress after passage of the 19th Amendment to the Constitution guaranteeing women the right to vote. She opposed feminist groups such as the League of Women Voters and the National Woman's Party. Robertson voted against bills funding maternity and childcare on the grounds that they were an unwarranted governmental intrusion on personal rights. This earned her the support of the Daughters of the American Revolution, of which she was a member. She also voted against the Dyer Anti-Lynching Bill.

== Later life ==
Robertson was appointed by President Warren G. Harding as a welfare worker at Veterans Hospital Number 90 at Muskogee in May 1923. She retired to run a 50-acre (20 ha) dairy farm. She also owned a café, named Sawokla. In 1925, her home and café were burned down by her opponents in retaliation for her votes in Congress.

Robertson died in Muskogee, and was interred in Greenhill Cemetery.

== Legacy and honors ==
- She bequeathed her personal library and family papers to the University of Tulsa, where they became part of the collection of the McFarlin Library. The papers include Creek translations by her parents and her grandfather, Samuel Austin Worcester.
- Robertson Hall, a dormitory at the University of Science and Arts of Oklahoma in Chickasha was named in her honor.
- In Muskogee, the Alice Robertson Middle School is home to the 8th and 9th Grade Center of the town.
- She is one of only five Republicans to have ever held the 2nd district seat in Congress.

== Electoral history ==
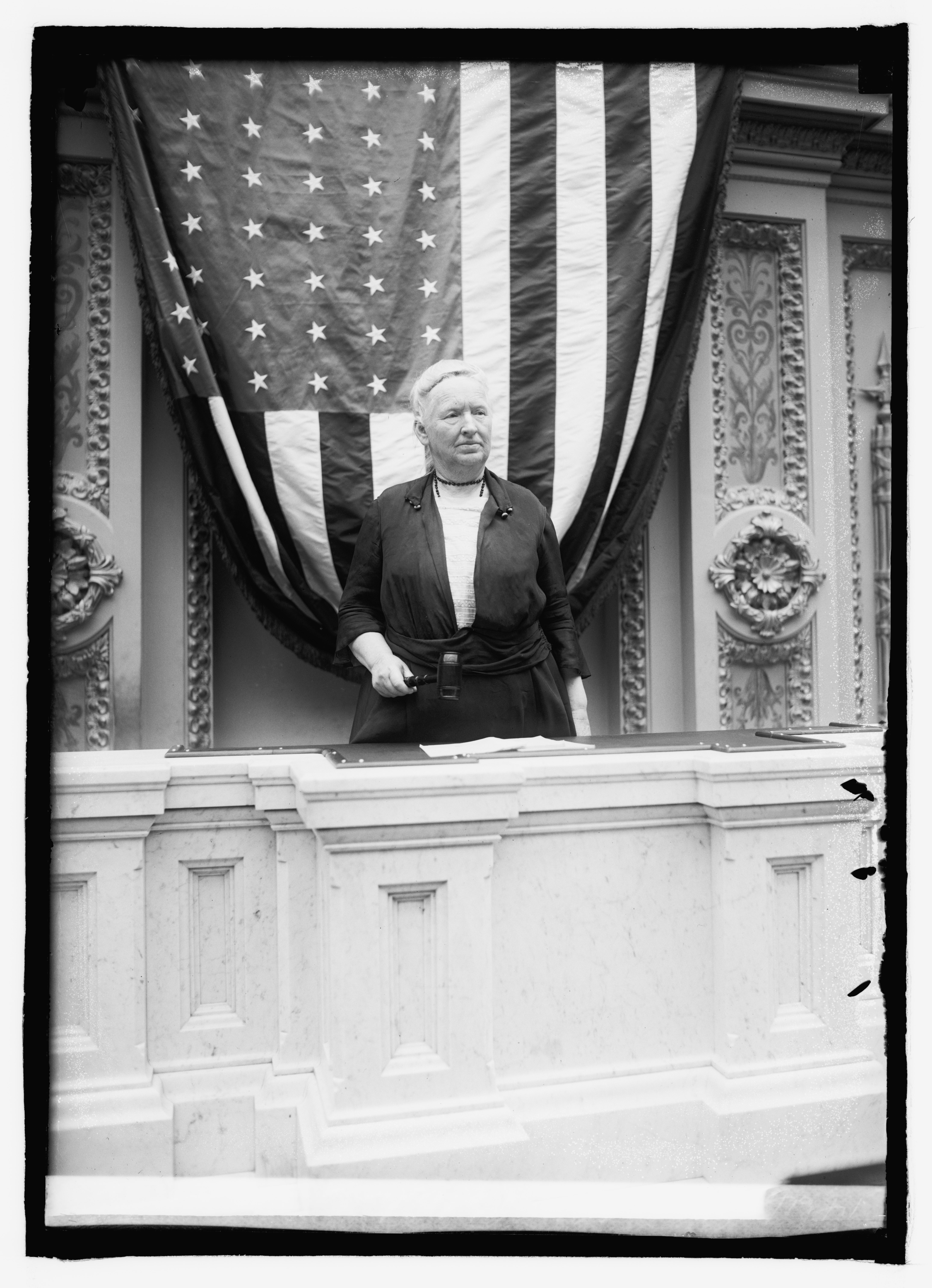
Robertson presiding over the House chamber on June 21, 1921.

1920 United States House of Representatives elections in Oklahoma
Party	Candidate	Votes	%
Republican	Alice Mary Robertson		48.8%
Democratic	William Hastings (incumbent)		48.4%
Socialist	John T. Cooper		2.8%
Total votes			100
Republican gain from Democratic			

1922 United States House of Representatives elections in Oklahoma
Party	Candidate	Votes	%
Democratic	William Hastings		57.7%
Republican	Alice Mary Robertson (incumbent)		41.7%
Independent	S. M. Gipson		0.6%
Total votes			100
Democratic gain from Republican			

== See also ==
- Women in the United States House of Representatives

U.S. House of Representatives
Preceded by William W. Hastings	United States Representative for the 2nd congressional district of Oklahoma; 1921–1923	Succeeded by William W. Hastings
