= Ainsworth Blunt =

American missionary

Ainsworth Emery Blunt

Personal details
- Born: February 22, 1800 Amherst, New Hampshire
- Died: December 10, 1865 (aged 65) Dalton, Georgia
- Spouse: Harriet Eames Blunt
- Children: Martha Blunt, John Blunt, Sarah Blunt, Harriett Blunt, Ainsworth Blunt, Jr., Eliza Ramsey Blunt
- Occupation: Missionary, Mayor

Ainsworth Blunt (February 22, 1800 – December 10, 1865) was an American missionary to the Cherokee at the Brainerd Mission and the first mayor of Dalton, Georgia. Ainsworth Emery Blunt was born on February 22, 1800, in Amherst, New Hampshire (Hillsborough County) to John Isaac (1756–1836) and Sarah (Eames) Blunt (1765-1858). He was baptized in the Amherst Congregationalist Church on March 9, 1800. He married Harriet Ellsworth (25 September 1790 – 10 June 1847) on 17 November 1822. They had five children: Martha (21 December 1825 – 23 June 1898), John (25 December 1828-), Sarah, Harriet (12 October 1823 – 3 December 1825), and Ainsworth, Jr. (6 February 1832 – 1911).

On 31 March 1822, Blunt embarked from Boston, Massachusetts, to Savannah, Georgia, en route to the American Board of Commissioners for Foreign Missions station at Brainerd in the Cherokee Nation where he served as a farmer and mechanic. After arrival he met his future wife, Harriet, who had come to the mission station with her brother, John Clark Ellsworth, on 24 November 1821. Because of the ill health of his wife, he and his family left Brainerd on 26 August 1837 and moved to the Candy Creek mission which was located in present-day Bradley County, Tennessee.

After the closure of the mission, he accompanied the Cherokee on the Trail of Tears in 1838, but returned to Chattanooga, Tennessee, after becoming ill. He acquired the Brainerd Mission property after the removal of the Cherokee in order to protect the mission cemetery.

In 1843, he and his family relocated to Cross Plains, Georgia and he was elected the first mayor of Dalton, Georgia when the town was incorporated in 1847.

Blunt's second marriage was to Elizabeth Christian Ramsey (1816-1899) in 1849. They had one child, Eliza "Lillie" Ramsey Blunt (4 September 1851 – 1937).

Blunt refugeed to Illinois in 1864. During his leave, his home was used as a Union hospital. The Blunt house was placed on the National Register of Historic Places in 1981 and it is currently owned by the Whitfield-Murray Historical Society.

Blunt died on December 10, 1865.
