= John Howard Payne =

American actor and writer

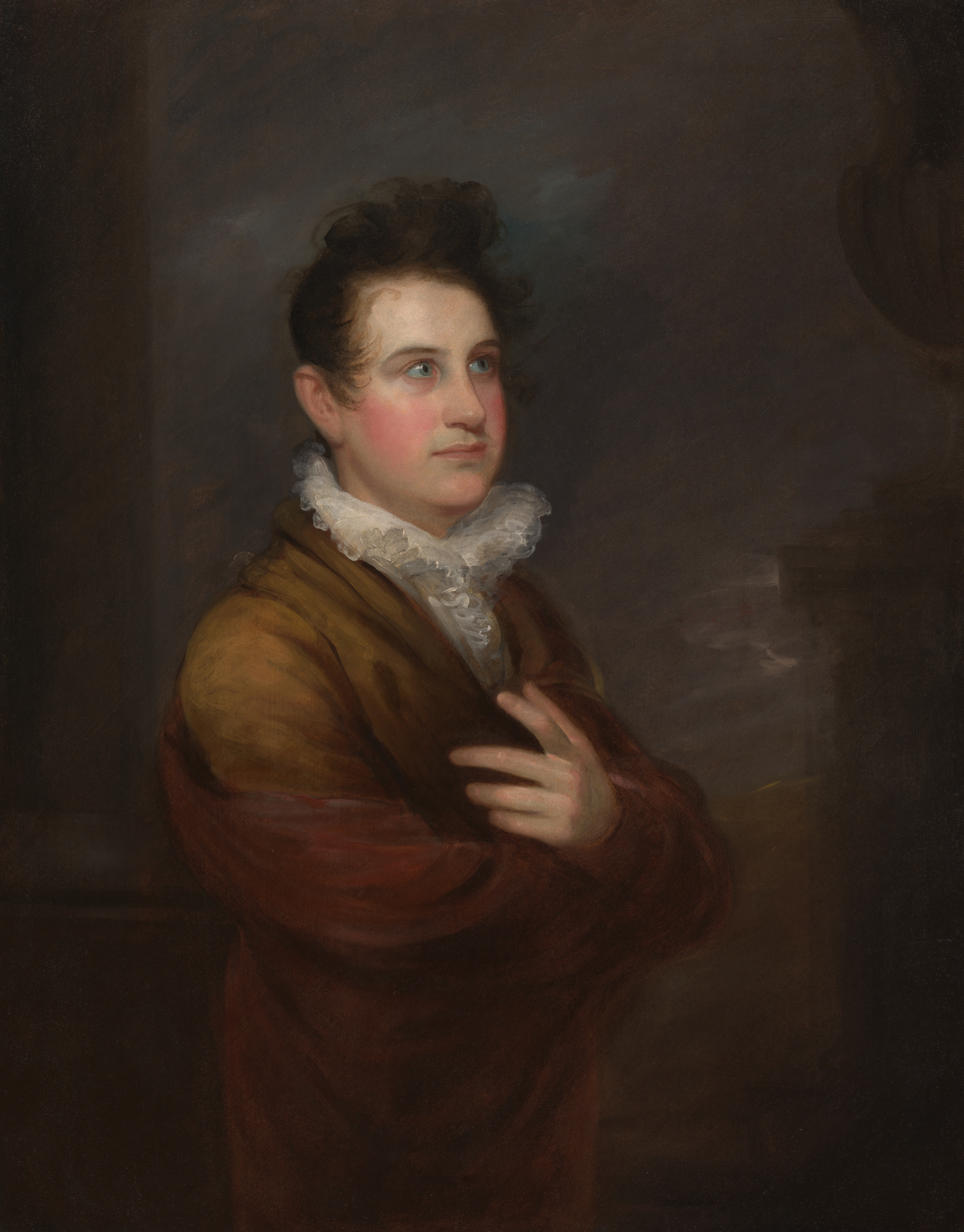
- Portrait by John Wesley Jarvis, c. 1812
- Born: June 9, 1791; New York City, New York, U.S.
- Died: April 10, 1852 (aged 60); Tunis, Beylik of Tunis
- Resting place: Oak Hill Cemetery; Washington, D.C., U.S.
- Occupations: Actor, poet, playwright, and author

John Howard Payne (June 9, 1791 – April 10, 1852) was an American actor, poet, playwright, and writer who had nearly two decades of a theatrical career and success in London. He is today most remembered as the creator of "Home! Sweet Home!", a song he wrote in 1822 that became widely popular in the United States and the English-speaking world. Its popularity was revived during the American Civil War, as troops on both sides embraced it.

After his return to the United States in 1832, Payne spent time with the Cherokee in the Southeast and interviewed many elders. Intending to write about them, he amassed material about their culture, language and society, which have been useful to scholars. But his published theory that suggested their origin as one of the Ten Lost Tribes of ancient Israel has been thoroughly disproved. At that time, European Americans were still strongly influenced by a Biblical basis of history in trying to understand origins of the peoples in the Americas.

Friends helped gain Payne's appointment in 1842 as American Consul to Tunis, where he served for nearly 10 years until his death. Although he was first buried there, in 1883 his remains were returned to the United States and buried in Washington, D.C. This was paid for by philanthropist W. W. Corcoran. In 1970 Payne was posthumously inducted into the Songwriters Hall of Fame.

== Early life and education ==
John Howard Payne was born in New York City on June 9, 1791, one of seven sons among nine children. Early in his childhood, the family moved to Boston, Massachusetts, where his father headed a school. The family also spent time at his grandfather's colonial-era house in East Hampton, New York, which was later preserved in honor of Payne. As a youth, Payne showed precocious dramatic talent, but his father tried to discourage that path. After the death of an older son, his father installed young Payne, age 13, in his late brother's position at the same accountants' firm in New York, but Payne showed he had no mind for commerce.

Payne's interest in theater was irrepressible. He published the first issue of The Thespian Mirror, a journal of theater criticism, at age 14. Soon after that, he wrote his first play, Julia: or the Wanderer, a comedy in five acts. Its language was racy, and it closed quickly. But Payne's work on The Thespian Mirror had caught the attention of William Coleman, the editor of the New-York Evening Post. He believed that Payne showed promise to contribute to the city's cultural future, and sought a sponsor to support Payne's college education. John E. Seaman, a wealthy New Yorker, took on that financial responsibility. Columbia University was ruled out because of proximity to the distraction of young actresses, and even the College of New Jersey (as Princeton was then known) was considered too close to the city. They selected Union College in Schenectady, New York. Novelist Charles Brockden Brown, an active promoter of New York City, accompanied the young Payne upstate as far as Albany.

Payne started a college paper called the Pastime, which he kept up for several issues. When he was 16, his mother died, and the academy run by his father was failing. Payne, unhappy in his "exile" at Union, left at Easter to be with his family. He told his grieving father that he was dropping out of college to pursue a stage career. On February 24, 1809, he made his debut at the old Park Theatre in New York in the role of Young Norval in Douglas. Scoring a brilliant success, he went on to become the first American actor to play Hamlet; regarded as a prodigy, he was regaled as a home town wonder when he returned to Boston, among other major cities where he toured. His appearances as Romeo to Eliza Poe, Edgar Allan Poe's mother, won particular acclaim, and he favored her to play opposite him in comedies. But despite his success, he had difficulty getting paid by the theaters. In a brief interval away from the theatre, he founded the Athenaeum, a circulating library and reading room.

Payne was friends with Sam Colt and his brother John C. Colt; the latter was accused of murdering printer Samuel Adams. Payne was a character witness at John Colt's murder trial. Colt was convicted and sentenced to death, but Payne acted as a witness in his wedding ceremony to Caroline Henshaw, which took place on the morning of Colt's scheduled execution.

== Career ==
Befriended by the English tragedian George Frederick Cooke, who appeared with Payne in King Lear at New York's Park Theatre, Payne decided to seek recognition in London's theatre world, and he sailed across the Atlantic in February 1813.

Although London had numerous actors, Payne quickly drew praise in his engagements at Drury Lane and Covent Garden. Next he performed in Paris. Resuming his interest in playwriting, he wrote original plays, and also adapted and translated a variety of French works for production in England. In 1818, he sold his Brutus, which gained much respect. But a constant need for money led him to expand into theater management at Sadler's Wells Theatre, an endeavor that clearly proved it was not among his skills.

In 1823, Payne sold a group of his plays to Charles Kemble, the manager of Covent Garden Theatre, for £230. But, the first that Kemble chose to stage was already being produced elsewhere. Payne considered this a minor hurdle. By tinkering with the plot and adding song lyrics, Payne transformed it into an operetta he entitled Clari; or the Maid of Milan. Among the new material was "Home, Sweet Home," a reworking of a poem he had written as a Union College student. This song helped make the operetta an instantaneous success and Payne a famous man. Set to music Sir Henry Bishop adapted from an Italian folk tune, the song ensured Payne's lasting fame, The sheet music rapidly sold 100,000 copies, earning its publishers £2,100 net profit in the first year. Years later, when the Lincoln family was mourning the death of their son, the president asked that the song be played repeatedly at the White House. As was typical throughout his career, however, Payne realized only meager profits from its enormous popularity. "While his money lasted, he was a prince of bohemians", but had little business sense.

While in Europe, Payne had several romantic interests, including a brief infatuation with Mary Shelley, Percy Shelley's young widow and the author of Frankenstein. He lost interest when he realized she hoped only to use him to attract the notice of his friend, Washington Irving. Payne never married.

== 1832 Return to the US and study of the Cherokee ==
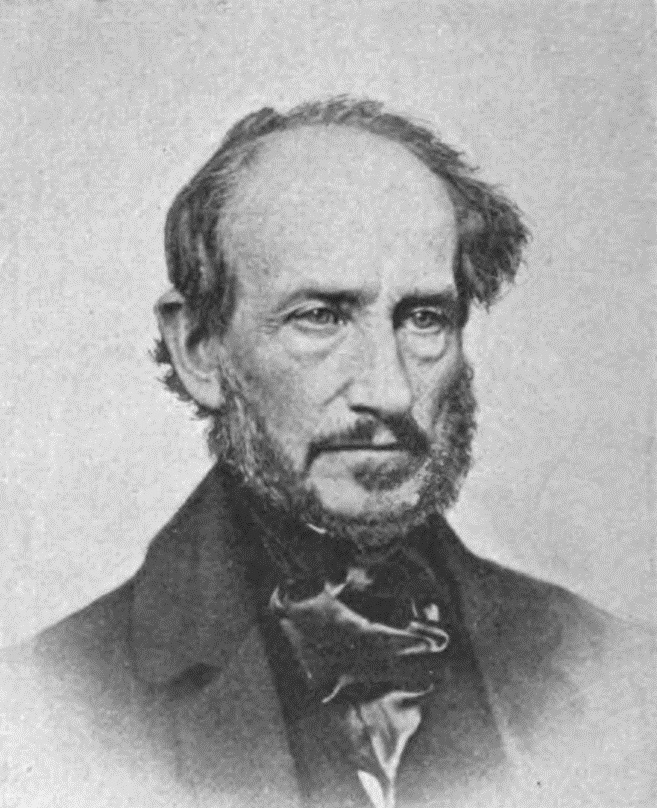
Portrait of Payne in an 1892 publication

Leaving Europe after nearly two decades, Payne returned to the United States in 1832. Friends arranged a benefit concert in New York to try to help him earn a stake to get resettled. He also toured the country with artist and naturalist John James Audubon.

Desperate to earn income by writing for periodicals, Payne sought to exploit public interest in the Cherokee people. He traveled south to Georgia as the guest of the Cherokee Chief John Ross in 1836 to gain acquaintance with the tribe. It was under great pressure by Georgia and the United States to remove to Indian Territory west of the Mississippi River. While staying with Ross, Payne was arrested and briefly imprisoned by Georgia authorities, as his visit was considered suspicious. When one of the soldiers sang "Home, Sweet Home," Payne mentioned that he had written it. This resulted in an intercession by General Edward Harden of Athens, to whom Payne had a letter of introduction, and officials released Payne.

What Payne found was contrary to his naive expectations. He admired the Cherokee achievements and developed a strong sympathy for their plight, as all the Southeast tribes were under pressure for Indian Removal to west of the Mississippi River, in what was then known as Indian Territory. President Andrew Jackson used US troops to forcibly accomplish this removal in 1838–1839, which became known as the tribe's Trail of Tears.

Payne lobbied Congress on behalf of the Cherokee. He also amassed a voluminous amount of research on their constitution, written language, customs, myths, food, and history of the tribe. Most of his papers were never published. He tried to advance the theory that the Cherokee were one of the ten lost tribes of Israel. Other figures of the early American period, such as Benjamin Franklin, shared the belief that Native Americans were descended from such a tribe, as their conception of history was based on the Bible. Payne specifically believed that he had found similarities between the Cherokee language and ancient Hebrew. The Cherokee and other American Indians have been thoroughly proven to have ancient origins in eastern Asia. But, Payne's study and papers have been an important source of information on Cherokee language and culture for subsequent scholars.

During his early years, Payne became known as a prominent literary and theater figure. He was closely associated with writer Washington Irving, with whom he collaborated on five plays. He is described as one of the more gifted young poets of his generation in the Cambridge History of American Poetry. But he chose other areas to develop, as poetry paid almost nothing at the start of the nineteenth century.

=== Last years in North Africa ===
In 1842, President John Tyler appointed Payne as the American Consul in Tunis, due in part from support from statesman William Marcy and Secretary of State Daniel Webster. They had been moved by his famous song and wanted to help him. Payne served twice in North Africa (the area of present-day Tunisia). He died in Tunis in 1852 and was buried there in St. George's Protestant Cemetery.

== Late celebration ==
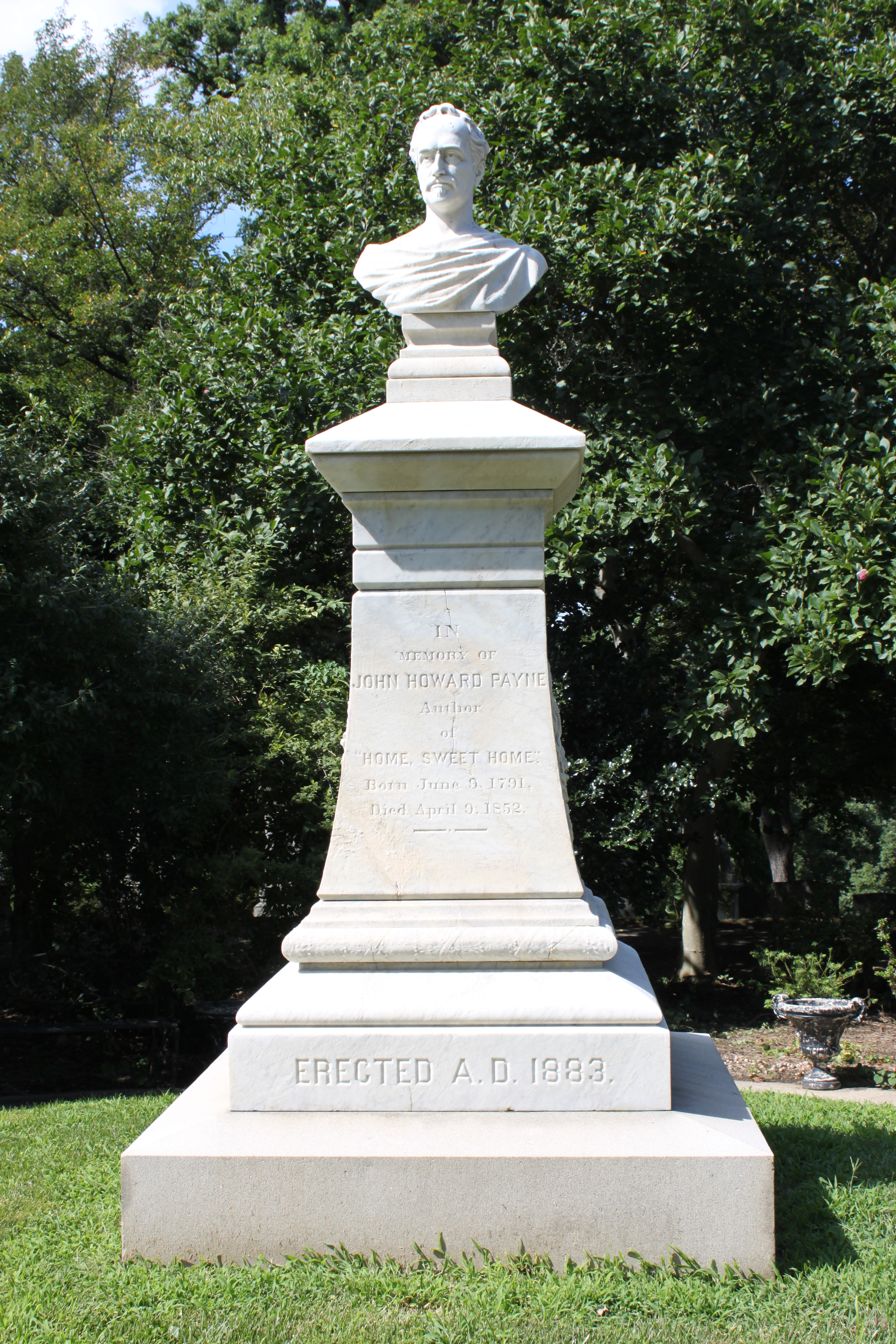
John Howard Payne's memorial stone in Oak Hill Cemetery in Washington, D.C.

"[N]ever was a dead poet so famous for a single song, or so honored." Payne's song was widely sung during the American Civil War, when it was treasured by troops of both the North and the South. It was also a particular favorite of President Abraham Lincoln. He asked Italian opera star Adelina Patti to perform it for him and his wife when the diva appeared at the White House in 1862. The Lincolns were still mourning the death of their son Willie.

Philanthropist W. W. Corcoran of Washington, D.C., arranged for Payne's reinterment in his last home city. (He was the founder of the Corcoran Gallery.) In February 1883, Payne's remains were disinterred and brought to the U.S. by the steamer Burgundia, sailing from Marseille. In New York, the coffin with Payne's remains was received with honors and transported by black funeral hearse to City Hall, where it was held in state while several thousand people visited the hall to pay respects. For a day, all the papers were filled again with the story of his life, for "his song is that one touch of nature which makes the world kin. It is the frailest thread of which fame was ever spun." The remains were transported to Washington, D.C., and held for services on the anniversary of Payne's birth in June.

A memorial service marked the reinterment of Payne's remains at Oak Hill Cemetery in the Georgetown neighborhood. (Corcoran had founded this cemetery, where many Civil War veterans were buried.) The memorial service was held on the 91st anniversary of Payne's birth and was attended by President Chester A. Arthur, members of his cabinet, the State Department, and the Supreme Court; the Marine Band, and a crowd of 2,000-3,000 that included numerous literary and other prominent people. Organizers arranged for a full choir to sing "Home, Sweet Home."

== Legacy and honors ==
- 1873: A bronze bust of Payne was installed with a public ceremony in Prospect Park, Brooklyn.
- 1883: Payne's ashes were brought back to the United States, received with honors and held in state at New York's City Hall. They were reinterred in a ceremony in Washington, D.C., on the 91st anniversary of his birth.
- Circa 1890s: Payne's grandfather's home on James Lane in East Hampton was preserved by Gustav Buek, a wealthy admirer of the poet, and identified as "Home Sweet Home" in Payne's honor. Payne spent time there as a child.
- 1970: John Howard Payne was posthumously inducted into the Songwriters Hall of Fame. Also inducted was his distant cousin, parlor song composer Carrie Jacobs-Bond, born in 1862.

== See also ==
- Daniel Sabin Butrick (Buttrick), co-authored The Payne-Butrick Papers, 2 vols. (Lincoln: University of Nebraska Press, 2010).
