= Brainerd Mission =

United States national historic place

Coordinates: 35°0′36.31″N 85°12′46.96″W

- Brainerd Mission Cemetery
- U.S. National Register of Historic Places
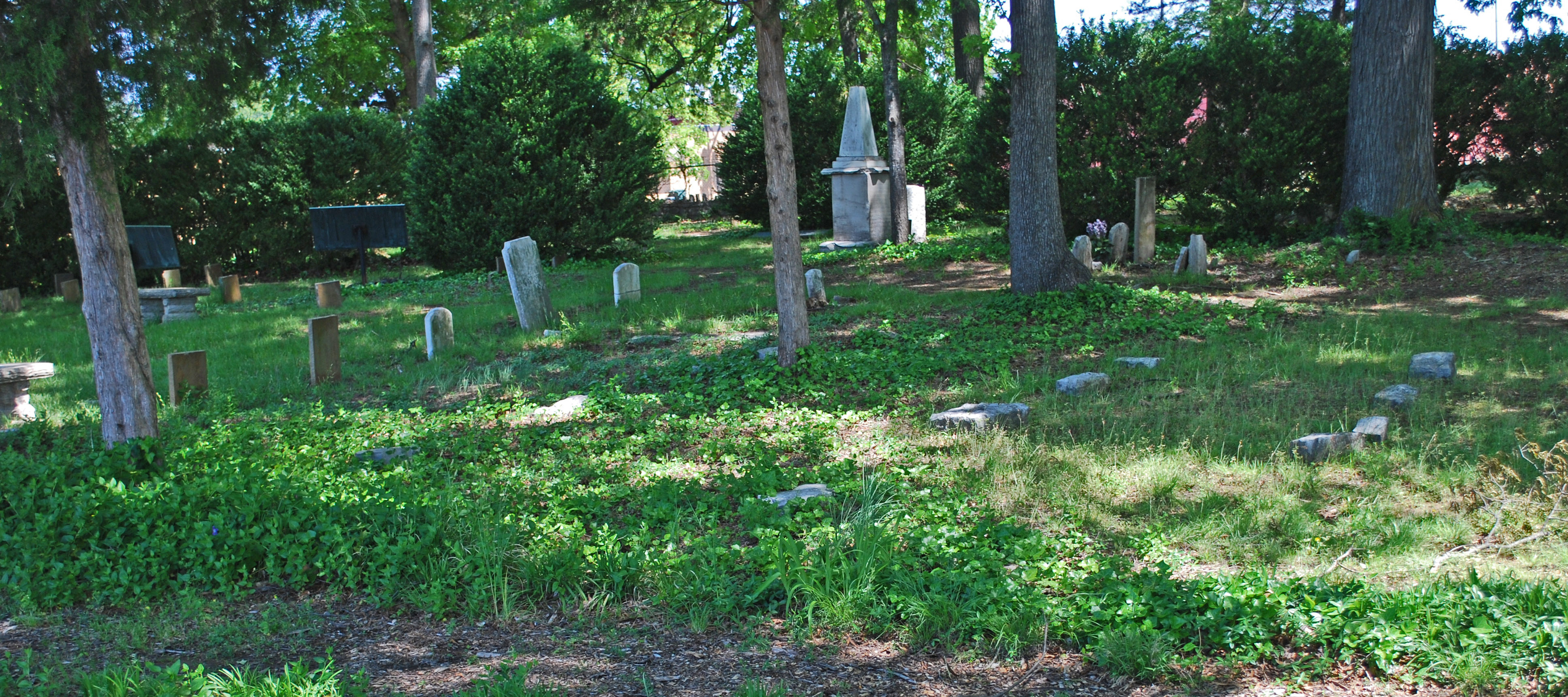
- Brainerd Mission Cemetery

- Location within Tennessee Location within the United States
- Location: 5700 Eastgate Loop, Chattanooga, Tennessee
- Area: 1 acre (0.40 ha)
- Built: 1817
- Architect: William Crutchfield
- NRHP reference No.: 79002435
- Added to NRHP: December 6, 1979

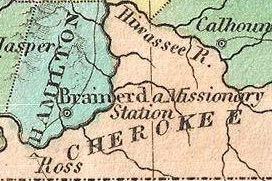
1827 map of Tennessee by Arthur Finley, incorrectly showing the "Brainerd Missionary Station" north of the Tennessee river in Hamilton County, rather than within the Cherokee Nation south of the river.

The Brainerd Mission was a Christian mission to the Cherokee in present-day Chattanooga, Tennessee. The associated Brainerd Mission Cemetery is the only part that remains, and is listed on the National Register of Historic Places.

== History ==
Brainerd Mission was established in 1817 by Cyrus Kingsbury, working on behalf of the American Board of Commissioners for Foreign Missions (ABCFM). The site was a tract on South Chickamauga Creek, near present-day Chattanooga. It was previously owned by John McDonald, a former Scots trader and grandfather of John Ross, the future principal chief of the Cherokee Nation. (Note: The location is now Brainerd Village, Osborne Office Park, and the Brainerd Walmart in Chattanooga.) Originally named Chickamauga Mission, it was renamed Brainerd Mission several months later, in honor of David Brainerd, an early New England missionary to Indians.

When the site was acquired, it contained only a dilapidated gristmill and a few other buildings. Within a short time, the missionaries, assisted by Cherokee living nearby, had added separate schoolhouses and dwellings for boys and girls, a cemetery, sawmill, blacksmith shop, wash house, meat house (smokehouse), corn house, and stables. They also built a missionary residence. By the end of the year, they had also cleared and fenced about 40 acres (160,000 m^{2}) to create a farm.

The mission was intended to provide a basic education to Cherokee children, while also instilling Christian religious values. Specifically, this included learning to read and write the English language, and to read the bible in English. The missionaries also taught life skills: for the girls, spinning, knitting, and sewing. The boys were taught animal husbandry, farming, and mechanical skills.

Before the end of 1818, the ABCFM withdrew Kingsbury and sent him to Mississippi as a missionary to the Choctaw Nation. Kingsbury continued serving the Choctaw for the rest of his active career.

On May 27, and 28, 1819, President James Monroe visited Brainerd Mission with General Edmund Pendleton Gaines. His was the first presidential visit to the Hamilton County area. He donated $1,000 to the work of the mission.

The mission officially closed on October 2, 1838, because of Cherokee removal to Indian Territory. In total, the Brainerd Mission served over 300 male and female Cherokee over its 21 years of operation. It was modestly successful in reaching its stated goals, providing many of its students with a basic level of English proficiency. It was less successful in its goal of religious conversion, as only a few Cherokee joined the church.

All that remains of the mission is the cemetery. The former site of the mission has been redeveloped most recently as the Eastgate Shopping Center. The cemetery is one of the oldest in Hamilton County and consists of 60 graves, most of which are missionary workers. The Daughters of the American Revolution has been integral to preservation of the site. They continue to own and maintain the cemetery.

== Notable missionaries ==
Several prominent missionaries served at Brainerd Mission at various times; people such as

- Samuel Worcester,
- Ainsworth Blunt and
- Cephas Washburn.

== Notable students ==
Several students who had graduated from Brainerd Mission became notable figures later in life. The number includes:

- Elias Boudinot, who became founder and editor of the Cherokee Phoenix, the first Cherokee newspaper; Boudinot was also a signer of the 1835 New Echota treaty.
- John Ridge, son of Major Ridge and cousin of Elias Boudinot. Both Ridges were major supporters of the 1835 New Echota treaty.
- David Brown (1806–1829), Cherokee clergyman who translated the New Testament into Cherokee from English, using the Sequoyah syllabary.

== See also ==
- Daniel Sabin Butrick (Buttrick)
- Cherokee Nation (19th century)
- Mission (Christianity)
- Samuel Worcester
- Brainerd missionay family:
  David Brainerd (1718 – 1747)
  John Brainerd (1720 – 1781)
  James Brainerd Taylor (1801–1829)
  Thomas Brainerd (1804- 1866))
