= Samuel Worcester =

Christian missionary to Cherokee (1798-1859)

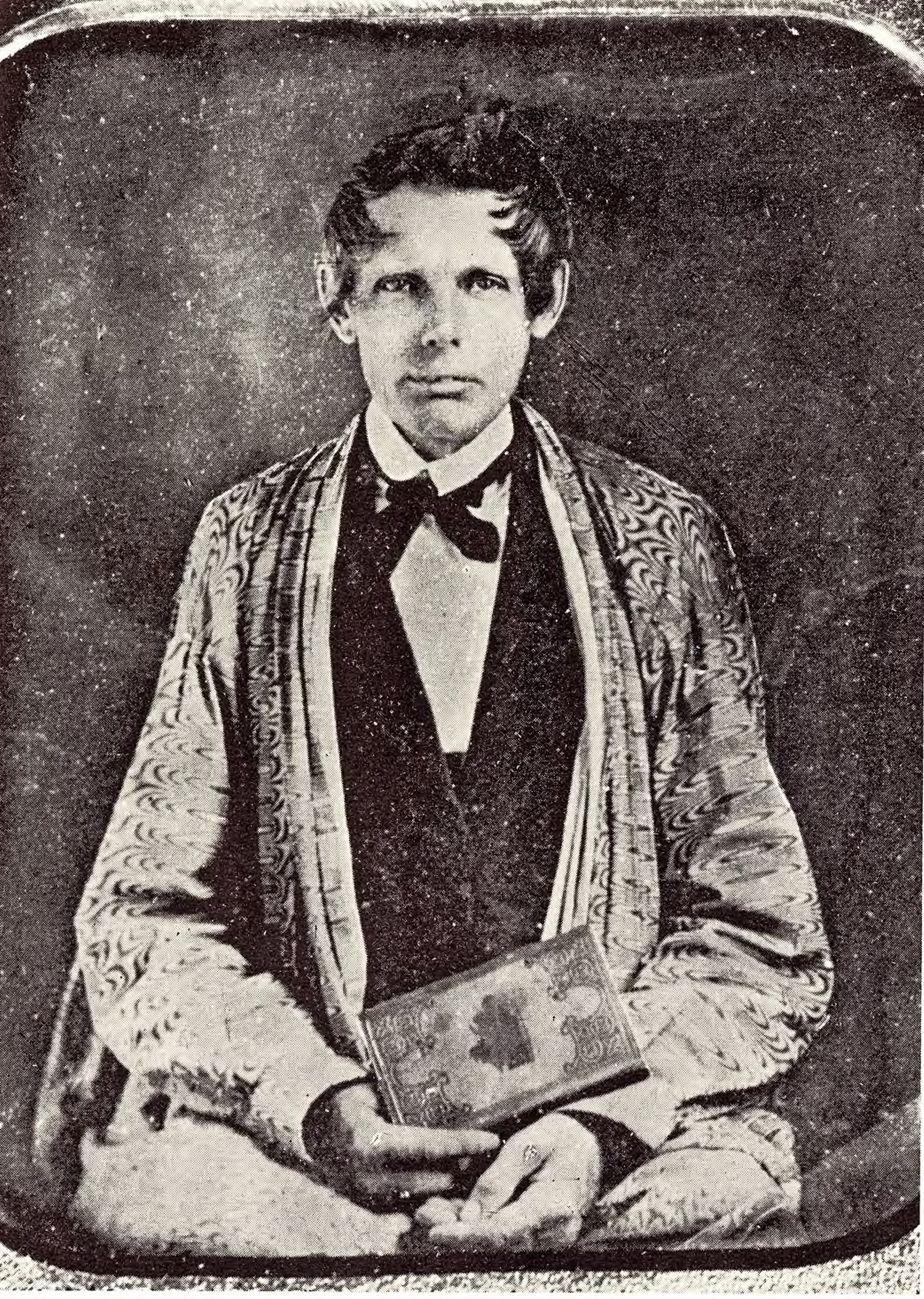
- Samuel Worcester, "Cherokee Messenger"
- Born: Samuel Austin Worcester; January 19, 1798; Peacham, Vermont, U.S.
- Died: April 20, 1859 (aged 61); Park Hill, Indian Territory
- Education: University of Vermont
- Occupations: Minister, linguist, printer, cofounder of Cherokee Phoenix newspaper
- Spouses: Ann Orr (m. 1825–1839) Erminia Nash (m. 1842–1850)
- Children: 7, including Ann Eliza
- Relatives: Alice Robertson (granddaughter)

Samuel Austin Worcester (January 19, 1798 – April 20, 1859) was an American missionary to the Cherokee, translator of the Bible, printer, and defender of the Cherokee sovereignty. He collaborated with Elias Boudinot (Cherokee) in Georgia to establish the Cherokee Phoenix, the first Native American newspaper, which was printed in both English and the Cherokee syllabary. The Cherokee gave Worcester the honorary name A-tse-nu-sti, which translates to "messenger" in English.

Worcester was arrested in Georgia and convicted for disobeying the state's law restricting white missionaries from living in Cherokee territory without a state license. On appeal, he was the plaintiff in Worcester v. Georgia (1832), a case that went to the United States Supreme Court. The court held that Georgia's law was unconstitutional. Chief Justice John Marshall defined in his dicta that the federal government had an exclusive relationship with the Indian nations and recognized the latter's sovereignty, above state laws. Both President Andrew Jackson and Governor George Gilmer ignored the ruling.

After receiving a pardon from the subsequent governor, Worcester left Georgia on a promise to never return. He moved to Indian Territory in 1836 in the period of Cherokee removal on the Trail of Tears. His wife died there in 1839. Worcester resumed his ministry, and continued translating the Bible into Cherokee. He established the first printing press in that part of the United States, working with the Cherokee to publish their newspaper in Cherokee and English. In 1963, he was inducted into the Hall of Great Westerners of the National Cowboy & Western Heritage Museum.

Worcester is a character in Unto These Hills, an outdoor drama that has been performed in Cherokee, NC since 1950.

== Early life and education ==
Worcester was born in Peacham, Vermont, on January 19, 1798, to the Rev. Leonard Worcester, a minister and Elizabeth "Betsy" Hopkins Worcester. His father was the seventh generation of pastors in his family, dating to ancestors who lived in England. According to Charles Perry of the Peacham Historical Association, the father Leonard Worcester also worked as a printer in the town. The young Worcester attended common schools and studied printing with his father. In 1819, he graduated with honors from the University of Vermont.

Samuel Worcester became a Congregational minister and decided to become a missionary. After graduating from Andover Theological Seminary in 1823, he expected to be sent to India, Palestine, or the Hawaii. Instead, the American Board of Commissioners for Foreign Missions (ABCFM) sent him to the American Southeast to minister to the local Native American tribes.

== Marriage and family ==
Worcester married Ann Orr of Bedford, New Hampshire, whom he had met at Andover. They moved to Brainerd Mission, where he was assigned as a missionary to the Cherokee in August 1825. The goals ABCFM set for them were, "...make the whole tribe English in their language, civilized in their habits and Christian in their religion." Other missionaries working among the Cherokee had already learned that they first needed to learn the Cherokee language. While living at Brainerd, the Worcesters had their first child, a daughter. Two years later, they moved to New Echota, established in 1825 as the capital of the nation on the headwaters of Oostanaula River in what is now Georgia. Worcester worked with Elias Boudinot (Cherokee) to establish the Cherokee Phoenix newspaper, the first published by a Native American nation. It was published in Cherokee, using the syllabary developed by Sequoyah, and in English.

The Worcesters had seven children together: Ann Eliza, Sarah, Jerusha, Hannah, Leonard, John Orr and Mary Eleanor. Ann Eliza followed her father in becoming a missionary. With her husband, William Schenck Robertson, she founded Nuyaka Mission in the Indian Territory.

Dr. Samuel Worcester had served as the American Missionary Board's official corresponding secretary. His father died at Brainerd in 1821 and was buried there.

== Cherokee Phoenix ==
Worcester was strongly influenced by a young Cherokee named Oowatie (later known by the English name he took, in honor of a mentor, Elias Boudinot). The Cherokee Boudinot had been educated in New England schools and was the nephew of Major Ridge, a wealthy and politically prominent Cherokee National Council member. The two men became close friends over the two years they had known each other. Sequoyah, a Cherokee from Tennessee, had independently developed a syllabary to create a writing system for the Cherokee language. This was a singular achievement for a person from a pre-literate society. He and his people had admired the written papers of the European Americans, which they called the "Talking Leaves."

Boudinot asked Worcester to use his printing experience to establish a Cherokee newspaper. Worcester believed the newspaper could be a tool for Cherokee literacy, and a means to draw the loose Cherokee community together; it would help promote a more unified Cherokee Nation. He wrote a prospectus for the paper that promised to publish laws and documents of the Cherokee Nation, articles on Cherokee manners and customs, as well as "news of the day."

Using his missionary connection, Worcester secured funds to build a printing office, buy the printing press and ink, and cast the syllabary's characters. Since the 86-character syllabary was new, Worcester made the metal type for each character. The two men helped produce the Cherokee Phoenix, which first rolled off the press on February 21, 1828, at New Echota (now Calhoun, Georgia). This was the first Native American newspaper to be published.

At some point, the Cherokees honored Worcester with a Cherokee name, A-tse-nu-tsi, meaning "messenger."

== Worcester in court and prison ==
The westward push of European-American settlers from coastal areas continued to encroach on the Cherokee, even after they had made some land cessions to the US government. With the help of Worcester and his sponsor, the American Board, they planned to fight the encroachment by using the courts. They wanted to take a case to the US Supreme Court to define the relationship between the federal and state governments, and establish the sovereignty of the Cherokee nation. No other civil authority would support Cherokee sovereignty in their land and self-government in their territory.

Hiring William Wirt, a former U.S. Attorney General, the Cherokee argued their position before the US Supreme Court in Georgia v. Tassel (the Court granted a writ of error for a Cherokee convicted in a Georgia court for a murder occurring in Cherokee territory, though the state refused to accept the writ) and Cherokee Nation v. Georgia (1831) (the court dismissed this on technical grounds for lack of jurisdiction). In writing the majority opinion, Chief Justice Marshall described the Cherokee Nation as a "domestic dependent nation" with no rights binding on a state.

Worcester and eleven other missionaries had met at New Echota and published a resolution in protest of an 1830 Georgia law prohibiting white men from living on Native American land without a state license. While the state law was an effort to restrict white settlement on Cherokee territory, Worcester reasoned that obeying the law would, in effect, be surrendering the sovereignty of the Cherokee Nation to manage their own territory. Once the law had taken effect, Governor George Rockingham Gilmer ordered the militia to arrest Worcester and the others who signed the document and refused to get a license.

After two series of trials, all eleven men were convicted and sentenced to four years of hard labor at the state penitentiary in Milledgeville. Nine accepted pardons, but Worcester and Elizur Butler declined their pardons, so the Cherokee could take the case to the Supreme Court. William Wirt argued the case, but Georgia refused to have a legal counsel represent it, claiming that no Indian could drag it into court. In its late 1832 decision, the Supreme Court ruled that the Cherokee Nation was independent and only the federal government had the authority to deal with it or other Indian nations. It vacated the convictions of Worcester and Butler. President Andrew Jackson, who favored Indian Removal, ignored the ruling by continuing to lobby Congress for a new treaty with the Cherokee, and Governor Gilmer continued to hold the two men prisoner.

Wilson Lumpkin assumed the governorship early the next year. Faced with the Nullification Crisis in neighboring South Carolina, he chose to free Worcester and Butler if they agreed to minor concessions. Having won the Supreme Court decision, Worcester believed that he would be more effective outside prison and left. He realized that the larger battle had been lost, because the state and settlers refused to abide by the decision of the Supreme Court. Within three years, the US used its military to force the Cherokee Nation out of the Southeast and on the "Trail of Tears" to Indian Territory, lands west of the Mississippi River.

== Later life ==
After being released, Worcester and his wife determined to move their family to Indian Territory to prepare for the arrival of the Cherokee. In 1835 he and his family moved to Tennessee, where they lived a short while before beginning their major trip by flatboat and steamer in 1836. They lost much of their household goods when a steamer sank. The journey to Dwight Presbyterian Mission in Indian Territory took seven weeks, during which Ann contracted a fever.

After reaching Dwight Presbyterian Mission, Worcester continued to preach to the Cherokee who had already moved to Indian Territory (they were later known within the nation as the Old Settlers, in contrast to the new migrants from the Southeast). In 1836, they moved to Union Mission on Grand River, then finally to Park Hill. Worcester's work included setting up the first printing press in that part of the country, translating the Bible and several hymns into Cherokee, and running the mission. In 1839, his wife Ann died; she had been serving as an assistant missionary. He remained in Park Hill, where he married again in 1842, to Erminia Nash.

Worcester worked tirelessly to help resolve the differences between the Georgia Cherokee and the "Old Settlers", some of whom had relocated there in the late 1820s. On April 20, 1859, he died in Park Hill, Indian Territory.

== Worcester House ==
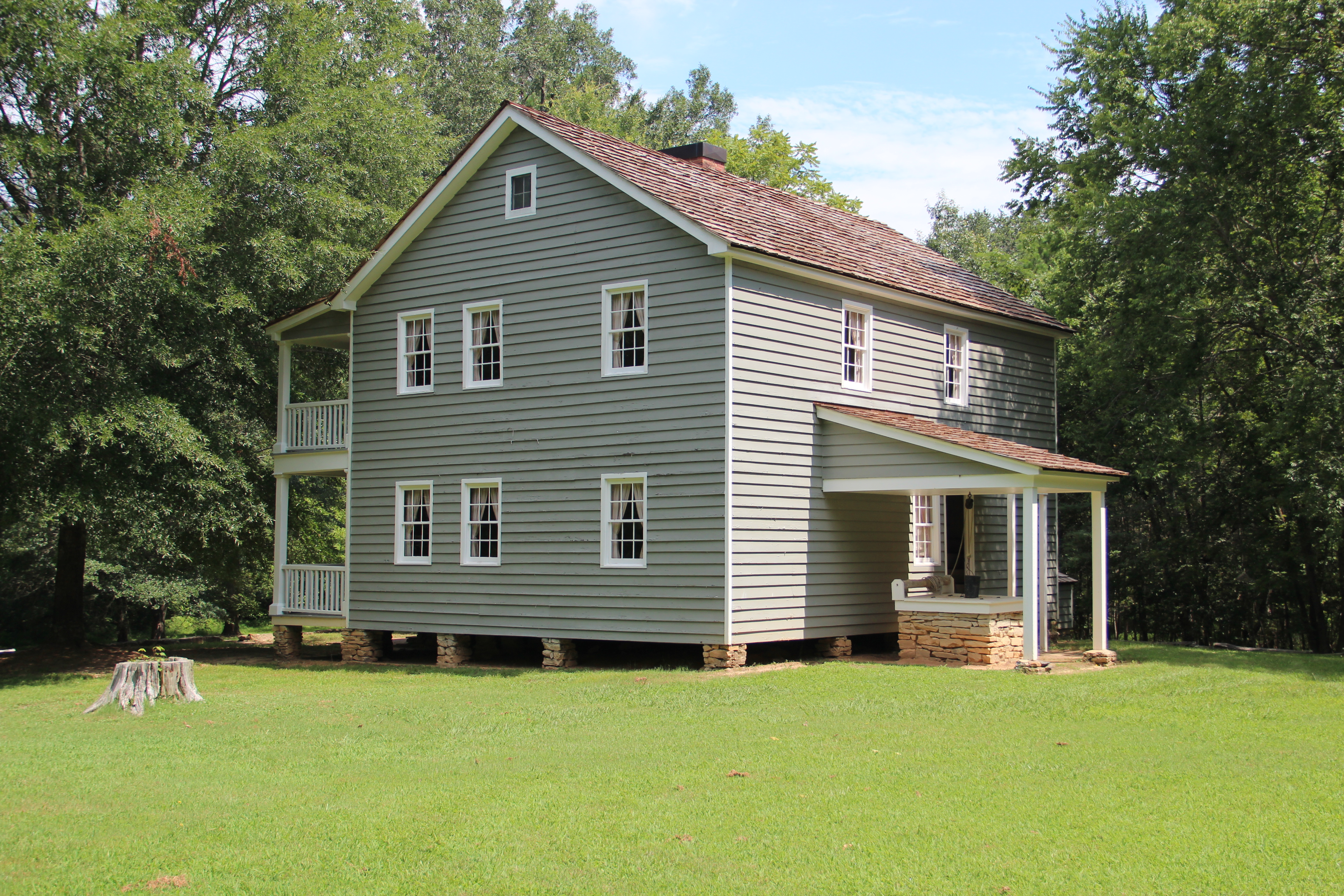
Samuel Worcester's home in New Echota

Worcester House is the only surviving original house on the land of the former Cherokee community of New Echota. The remainder of the buildings were destroyed by European-American settlers after the Cherokee were forced to remove in 1838. The Worcester house was constructed in 1828 as a two-story building.

The Worcesters lived in the house from 1828 until 1834. It was confiscated by a Georgian who obtained title in the 1832 Land Lottery. The house was owned by many Georgians through the years until 1952.

That year the house was transferred to the state of Georgia, and in 1954 to the Georgia Historical Commission. It is managed by the Georgia State Parks and Historic Sites, a division of the Georgia Department of Natural Resources. In 1962, the New Echota Historic Site was opened to the public. In 1973 it was designated as a National Historic Landmark District and is operated by the state. The Cherokee Council House was reconstructed here. The site recognizes Cherokee civilization.

== See also ==
- Brainerd Mission
- Daniel Sabin Butrick (Buttrick)

== Sources ==
- Bass, Athea (1936). Cherokee Messenger. University of Oklahoma Press. ISBN 0-8061-2879-8.
- Burke, Joseph C. (1969). "The Cherokee Cases: A Study in Law, Politics, and Morality". Stanford Law Review. 21 (500): 500–531. doi:10.2307/1227621. JSTOR 1227621.
- Langguth, A. J. (2010). Driven West: Andrew Jackson and the Trail of Tears to the Civil War. New York: Simon & Schuster. ISBN 978-1-4165-4859-1.
- McLoughlin, William G. (December 1994). The Cherokees and Christianity, 1794-1870: Essays on Acculturation and Cultural Persistence. University of Georgia Press. ISBN 0-8203-1639-3.
- "New Echota Self-Guiding Trail". Georgia State Parks and Historic Sites.
