= Thomas Brainerd =

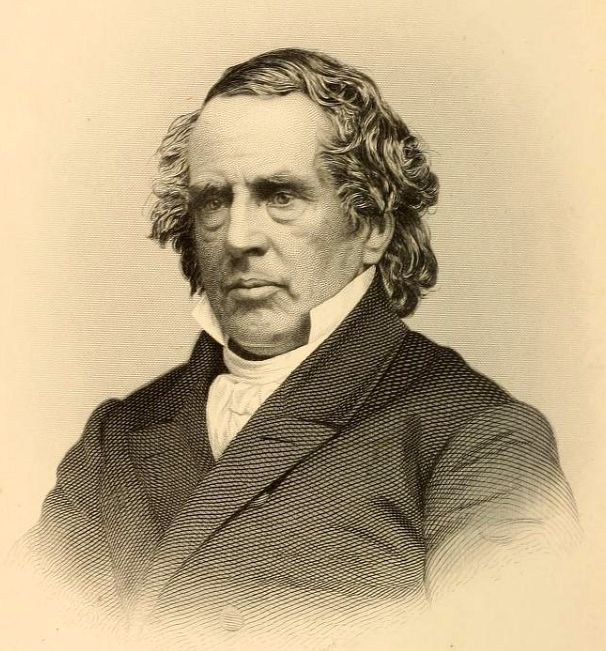
Reverend Thomas Brainerd

Thomas Brainerd (1804 – 1866) was a Presbyterian minister, abolitionist, Doctor of Divinity and author of various religious works, tracts and biographies. He graduated from the academy at Louisville, New York, and began teaching at the relatively young age of seventeen, while studying for a professional career. Thereafter he embarked on a career as a Presbyterian minister that brought him to Philadelphia's Old Pine Street Church, where he served for some thirty years, while overseeing major improvements over its structure. During the American Civil War, Brainerd, through his church, provided vital support for Union troops while during his spare time, campaigned against slavery. He also played an important role in the founding of the Union League.

== Early life and family ==
Brainerd, was born at Leyden, New York, but his family moved to Rome, New York where he spent his childhood and early life. He was the youngest of twelve siblings, born June 17, 1804, the year after his father's removal to New York. His parents were of the Puritan faith, his father being a pious man, yet stern when it came to moral principles and duties. Beginning at the age of three, he walked several miles to school in Lowville

Brainerd initially moved to Philadelphia in the late 1820s to teach and earn money to pay for his theological training. During this time, he was connected with Rev. James Patterson’s church in the northern part of the city. His first teaching assignment took him to Booneville, New York. Though slightly older than most of his students, he had little trouble in maintaining discipline and creating an incentive to learn. His next assignment took place in the township of Lee, New York, proceeding Albert Barnes, a theologian, clergyman and abolitionist. Brainerd graduated from Hamilton College, in upstate New York, where he studied law for a short term. He later moved to Andover, Massachusetts for his seminary studies at Andover Theological Seminary. Knowledge of his student life in Andover is almost entirely derived from his correspondence. Charles J. Finney, Presbyterian minister and leader in the Second Great Awakening, and Wait Talcott, a close political ally of Abraham Lincoln, both of whom he corresponded with frequently. While in Andover his acquaintance with Langstroth grew while they shared correspondence.This ultimately resulted in his introduction and subsequent engagement to one of his daughters, Miss Sarah Jennings Langstroth, to whom he was married on October 20, 1831. Sarrah died June 20, 1835.

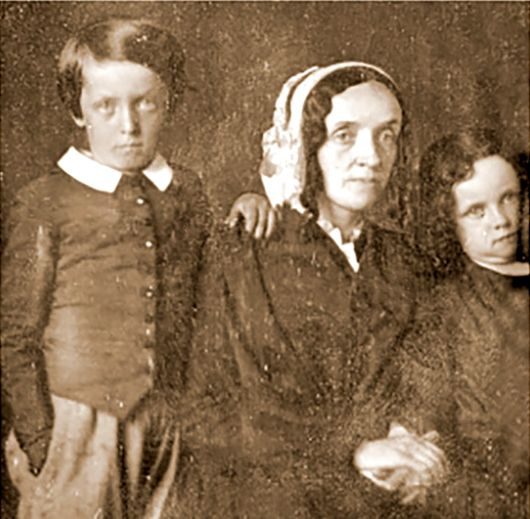
Mary Whiting Brainerd and children; photo taken in 1847 (Note: Oldest son Thomas, standing at left, eventually moved to Montreal, Canada)

His second marriage was in New Haven, Connecticut to Mary Whiting on October 29, 1836, the ceremony performed by Reverend Leonard Bacon. Two of his four children did not survive childhood; the eldest daughter in her seventh year, and the youngest son in his fifth.

Returning to Philadelphia, Brainerd provided assistance to the Trenton Academy in the absence of the principal, where he was introduced to Thomas Langstroth, of Trenton, New Jersey, a retired Philadelphia merchant.

Brainerd had four children, the eldest,Thomas Chalmers, was born on September 27, 1837, in Philadelphia. (Note: Thomas and Mary Whiting Brainerd, had four children: Thomas Chalmers Brainerd - September 27, 1837, Mary Whiting Brainerd - February 24, 1839, Emma Gertrude Brainerd - January 3, 1841, Charles Brainerd - January 21, 1844) He joined the Union Army as a first lieutenant in 1863, and was present during the First Battle of Charleston Harbor in South Carolina during the American Civil War and served as Lieutenant and an assistant surgeon to treat a large number of wounded soldiers.

== Ministry life ==
After graduating, Brainerd moved to Philadelphia, substituting as a preacher for the Reverend. Dr. James Patterson of the First Presbyterian church of the Northern Liberties. Thereafter he removed to Cincinnati, and became an assistant of the Rev. Dr. Lyman .

Brainerd arrived in Cincinnati with his wife on November 25, 1831, where he was cordially received and welcomed to reside in the home of his "venerated friend", Judge Jacob Burnet. (Note: Burnet was considered the "father of the Ohio constitution" and was an associate justice of the Ohio Supreme Court from 1821 until his resignation in 1828 to serve as United States Senator.) As it was settled by the committee, Brainered was relocated in the Fourth Church, in the eastern part of the city on Front Street, above Deer Creek, which was still unpaved. "With the enthusiasm of youth" Brainerd undertook the task of gathering a congregation and established a Sabbath-school of about three hundred children. During this time Brainerd visited various families living in Deer Creek Township and Columbia, (Note: Several places named Columbia in Ohio exist.Specific Columbia not specified in source) and points in between. While given council to the sick, and kindness to the poor Brainerd tended a good reputation for himself and his church throughout the entire community.

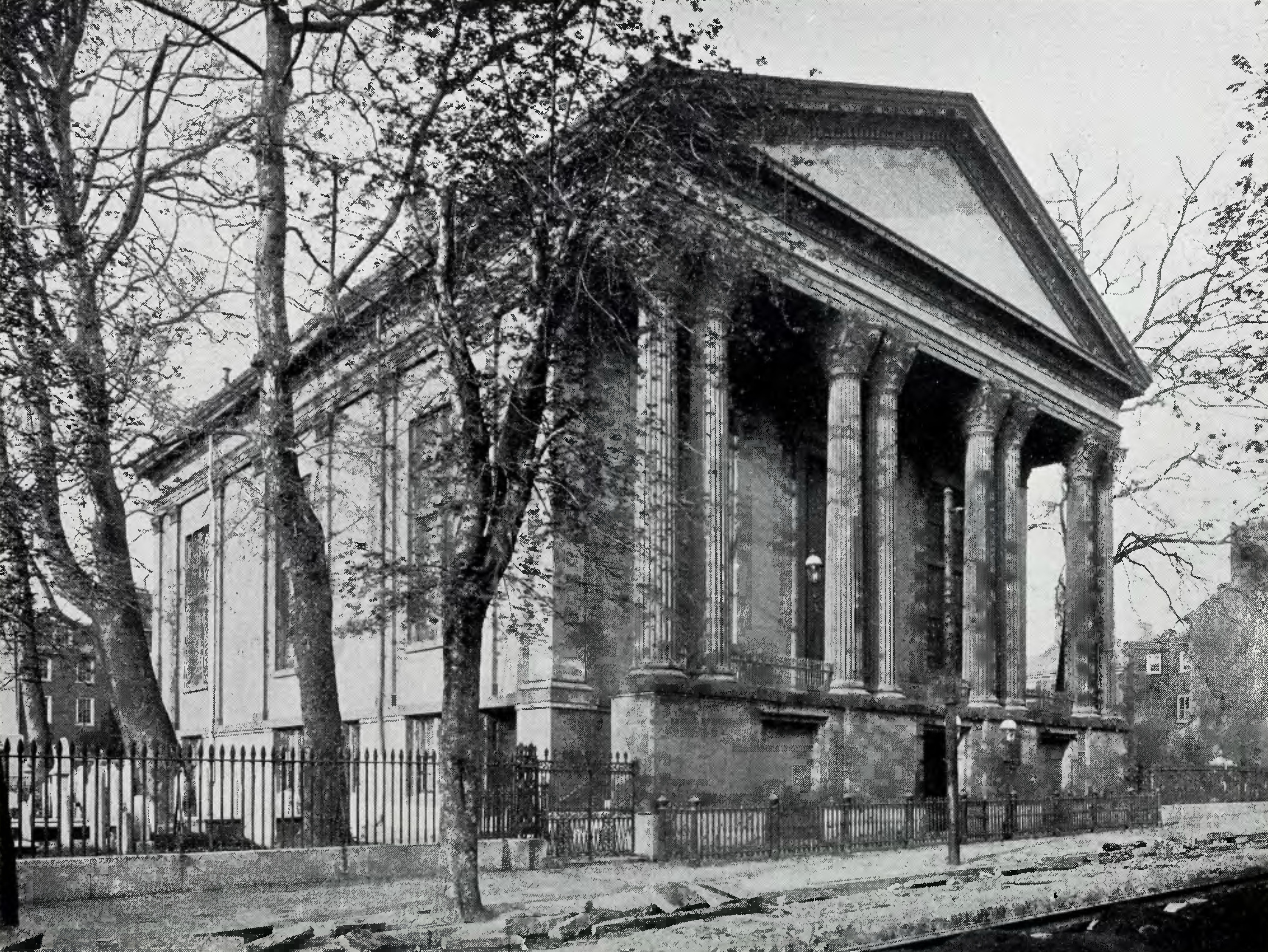
Old Pine Street Church Third Presbyterian Church (Church before 1837)

In 1836 Brainerd received a call from Dr. Ezra Stiles Ely and his congregation of Old Pine Street Presbyterian Church in Philadelphia, (Note: Founded in 1768 Old Pine Street Presbyterian Church, often known as known as the "Church of the Patriots, often served as a meeting place for the independence movement during the British occupation of Philadelphia in 1777–1778, who used the church for a hospital.) urgently requesting that he become their pastor, replacing Dr. Ely who had accepted a call to become Professor of Theology in Marion College in Missouri. Several other pastors had previously been called but had to decline the offer because of other commitments. Brainerd, now thirty-four years of age, accepted the offer and subsequently would serve as their pastor for the next thirty years. His salary was fixed at six hundred dollars for pastoral labor, with one hundred dollars added for his services as Clerk of the Executive Committee of the Home Missionary Agency. Before Brainerd arrived there were some reservations about using the church budget for making improvements for fear of bankruptcy, among other concerns. Under Brainerd's supervision he managed to procure the funding for needed improvements for the 70 year old church, whose congregation was still growing. In 1837 the interior was completely redesigned, additions were made, twin exterior staircases were added from Pine Street, colonial windows were replaced, and the exterior was stuccoed, at an expense of about $19,000.. In 1857 the north facade of the church was extended to the sidewalk. Brainerd also commissioned architect John Fraser who designed and added the grand Corinthian octastyle portico and pilasters.

During this time Brainerd was active in his writing for literary monthlies. In 1857 Brainerd published a short historical sketch of Pine Street Church, in the course of which he spoke of his predecessor Archibald Alexander. Brainered had arrived during the 1826–1837 cholera pandemic, which cost the lives of some six people that lived on his block. On the subject of slavery his position was unyielding, yet judicious, always taking any opportunity to speak when it could benefit either master or slave.

Brainerd together with Reverend Henry Ward Beecher, a congregationalist clergyman, social reformer and abolitionist, edited a youths' magazine, the weekly Christian Herald, published at Cincinnati, and the Presbyterian Quarterly Review. In 1865 he published a biographical work of his famed missionary relatives, David and John Brainerd, to revive the history of their names and missionary efforts.

When the radical abolitionist John Brown was executed in 1859, Brainerd's wife, Mary, created a great controversy between pro and anti-slavey members of the greater congregation when she wrote an article for American Presbyterian:

"Clavers might murder godly Brown, But could not rob him of his crown."

The crux of the controversy was over Brown being referred to as "godly". When Brainerd read the article he asked his wife, "Did you send this to the paper? It will never do to indorse John Brown's raid in this way." The morning after the article was published the editor of the American Presbylerian, Dr. Houghton, came calling at Brainerd's house, obviously upset, accompanied by various members of the clergy, to inform the Brainerds that they "peremptorily ordered their paper stopped". With mixed feelings of amusement and concern, Brainerd assured his callers that he would do what he could to get the publication out of an awkward situation. In the next week's issue, Brainerd posted an article explaining his wife's enthusiasm and sympathies over John Brown's death.

=== American Civil War ===
During the American Civil War Brainerd was active in civic affairs while also tending to the care of Union soldiers as they passed through Philadelphia. He also led the crusade in Philadelphia against slavery. Brainerd recognized clearly the inconsistency of human slavery in a nation that was founded on the morals and principles as set forth in the Declaration of Independence. He also recognized the immanent threat to the Union, that the issue of slavery would be a major factor in provoking conflict between the North and the South. Brainerd, however, never spoke about the issue with the fanaticism that was common among many abolitionists in his day and always exercised patience with those of differing views. He often sought the council of former President Henry Clay, John Rankin (Note: Rankin, of Ripley, Ohio, became known as one of Ohio's first and most active "conductors" on the Underground Railroad.) and other like minded people concerning the subject of slavery. In the years leading up to the Civil War Brainerd, like Clay, held the idea of gradual emancipation (Note: Clay had advocated for the gradual emancipation of slavery in Kentucky, but the state did not adopt Clay's plan for gradual emancipation.) as an option for slave owners that would help to avert war. After he traveled to the south, however, and after the Confederates had fired upon the American flag at Fort Sumter, he was convinced that the rebellion had to be firmly dealt with through armed conflict. Brainerd was instrumental in the founding of the Union League which gave practical and spiritual support to war weary Union soldiers.

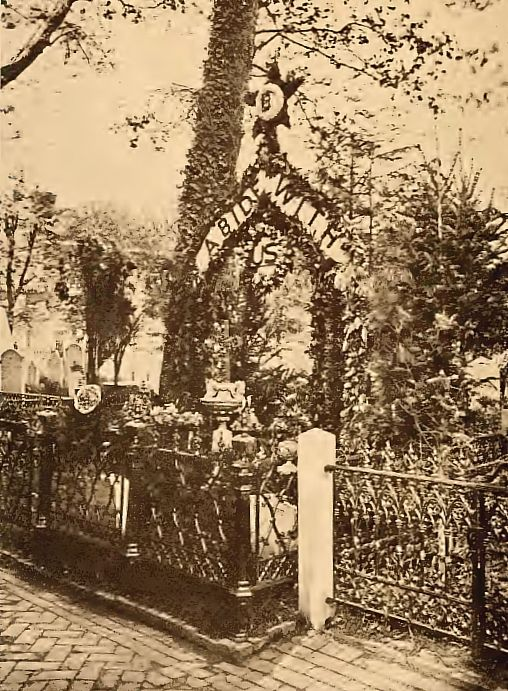
Gravesite of Thomas Brainerd in thr Old Pine Street Church cemetery, here shown decorated for the centennial anniversary of the Old Pine Street Church, 1868

== Final days ==
Brainerd's last public appearance was at Easton, where he delivered the annual address before the Brainerd Missionary Society of Lafayette College.

In August 1866 traveled to Scranton, Pennsylvania to visit his two young daughters. About a month after Brainerd's arrival his daughter’s came down with a case of cholera that was epidemic in parts of America and elsewhere in the world, and in a matter of days proved to be fatal. The youngest child, fifteen months old, died on August 10, her elder sister, three and a half years of age. Brainerd accordingly was overcome with grief. Compounded by the calamity of the war, his nervous system was unequal to the shock of this great tragedy. In his biography, his sister noted that the affair proved to be "a tremendous effort, from which it is likely he received fatal injury", i.e. a fatal stroke that followed day's later.

Brainerd had died suddenly without any apparent warning at the home of his son-in-law, Henry Whiting Boies, in Scranton, on August 21, 1866 at the age of 62, two years before the 100th anniversary of the founding of the Old pine Street Church, the celebration of which he had been earnestly looking forward to.

At eight a.m. the following morning the Reverend. Dr. Milo J. Hickok, (Note: Reverend Dr. Milo Judson Hickok (1809–1873) was a prominent 19th-century Presbyterian minister in Northeastern Pennsylvania; served as the foundational pastor of the First Presbyterian Church in Scranton.) of Scranton, accompanied by many of Scranton's leading citizens, including the Methodist, Baptist, and Episcopal, clergymen of the area, all gathered in earnest at the house of Brainerd’s son-in-law, where Dr. Hickok conducted a short service. Thereafter they all accompanied the body to the railroad station to be brought back to Philadelphia. Brainerd's funeral in Philadelphia was held on Saturday afternoon, August 30. The stores in the neighborhood were closed, the bell of St. Peter’s (Episcopal) Church was tolled His funeral and memorial service was attended by a large assembly of people from the congregation, including members of the clergy, along with various statesmen and prominent people from the greater community of Philadelphia. After services were offered, Brainerd's remains were laid next to his two children in the Old Pine Street cemetery.

== Works ==
While Brainerd was fulfilling his clerical commitments he contributed much to various literary monthlies, writing and publishing various sermons and tracts. Months before his death, he published The Life of John Brainerd, the brother of David Brainerd, who succeeded him as Missionary to the Indian nations of New Jersey.

- The Life of our Lord and Savior Jesus Christ, Introduction. 1834.
- The lament of the church at the sepulchre of the righteous : a sermon on the death of Frederick A. Raybold, Esq., delivered in the Third Presbyterian Church, Philadelphia, May 11th, 1851. 1851.
- Patriotism aiding piety. A sermon, preached in the Third Presbyterian church, Philadelphia, on the 30th of April, 1863. 1863.
- The Life of John Brainerd, the brother of David Brainerd. 1865.
- Ancestry of Thomas Chalmers Brainerd. 1948.

== See also ==
- Brainerd missionay family:
  David Brainerd (1718 – 1747)
  James Brainerd Taylor (1801–1829)
  John Brainerd (missionary) (1720 – 1781)
  Thomas Brainerd (1804- 1866)

== Bibliography ==
- Allen, Reverend R. H., ed. (1870). Report of the Centennial Celebration of Old Pine Street Church (PDF). Philadelphia: Henry B. Ashmead, Book and Job printers.
- Brainerd, Dwight (1948). Ancestry of Thomas Chalmers Brainerd. Portland, maine: Anthoensen Pr.
- Brainerd, Mary (1870). Life of Rev. Thomas Brainerd, D.D. : for thirty years pastor of Old Pine Street Church, Philadelphia. Philadelphia: Lippincott.
- Brainerd, Thomas (1865). The Life of John Brainerd, the brother of David Brainerd. Philadelphia: Presbyterian Publication Committee.
- Cloutier, J.-Roger (1966). "Brainerd, Thomas Chalmers". Dictionary of Canadian Biography. University of Toronto.
- Gibbons, Hughes Oliphant (1905). A history of old Pine Street : being the record of an hundred and forty years in the life of a colonial church. Philadelphia: John C. Winston Company.
- Heidler, David S.; Heidler, Jeanne T. (2010). Henry Clay: The Essential American. Random House. ISBN 978-1588369956.
- Scott, John Welwood (1837). An historical sketch of the Pine Street : or, Third Presbyterian Church in the city of Philadelphia. Printed by L.R. Bailey.
- Strong, James; McClintock, John (1981). "Brainerd, Thomas, Dd". The Cyclopedia of Biblical, Theological, and Ecclesiastical Literature. Grand Rapids, Michigan: Baker Book House.
- White, William Prescott (1895). The Presbyterian church in Philadelphia : a camera and pen sketch of each Presbyterian church and institution in the city. Philadelphia, Pa.: Allen, Lane & Scott.
- —— (June 1914). "Presbyterrian Churches of Philadelphia". Journal of the Presbyterian Historical Society (1901-1930). 7 (6): 257–273. JSTOR 23323373.
- Zenos, Andrew C. (1932). Dumas Malone (ed.). Dictionary of American biography. Vol. II. New York: Charles Scribner's Sons.
- "History". Old Pine Conservancy, Philadelphia, PA. 2026.
- "The Church Building". Old Pine Conservancy. 2026.
