= New Lebanon Conference =

Meeting to resolve disputes over evangelism methods; did not achieve unity

The New Lebanon Conference of ministers was a meeting held in July 1827, in New Lebanon, New York, to resolve disputes in the Presbyterian churches concerning the so-called New Measures for evangelism instituted and popularized primarily by Charles Grandison Finney. "The organizers of the meeting appear to have been Nathan Beman and Lyman Beecher." The week-long series of meetings did not achieve unity among those who attended, but it did clarify the differences. Heman Humphrey, William Raymond Weeks, and some others represented the traditional side which opposed the New Measures while Finney was present with some supporters from the other side.

"[Asahel] Nettleton, Weeks, and others, who were not willing to accept uncritically all that occurred during the Western revivals in Oneida County, have been often blamed for not providing more documented evidence against Finney. But the fact is that they were often unsure of who was primarily responsible for the various innovations that were being pressed on the churches by a large group of itinerants and their younger imitators who appeared in the wake of the revivals." These methods included:

1. criticism of specific individuals by name from the pulpit for sins which were not generally known,
2. urging those who were under conviction of sin to make their way to the front of the meeting room for counselling,
3. repeated singing of the same hymns for emotional effect to convince the audience to respond visibly to the preaching,
4. urging outward motions of the body to accompany alleged inner conviction, etc. This culminated in the revivalistic preaching of Dwight L. Moody, Billy Sunday, and their successors.

The original name for the technique of inviting hearers to come forward was the "anxious seat" but it later came to be called an "altar call" or "the invitation" and was popularized in the twentieth century by Billy Graham.
