= David Brainerd =

Missionary in colonial North America

The Reverend David Brainerd
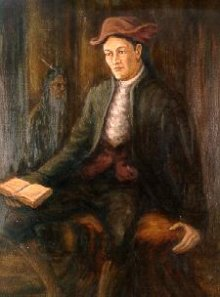

Orders
- Ordination: 1744

Personal details
- Born: April 20, 1718 Haddam, Connecticut Colony
- Died: October 9, 1747 (aged 29) Northampton, Province of Massachusetts Bay
- Denomination: Presbyterian
- Occupation: Minister, missionary

David Brainerd (April 20, 1718 – October 9, 1747) was an American Presbyterian minister and missionary to the Native Americans among the Delaware Indians of New Jersey. Missionaries such as William Carey and Jim Elliot, and Brainerd's cousin, the Second Great Awakening evangelist James Brainerd Taylor (1801–1829) cite Brainerd as inspiration.

== Early life ==
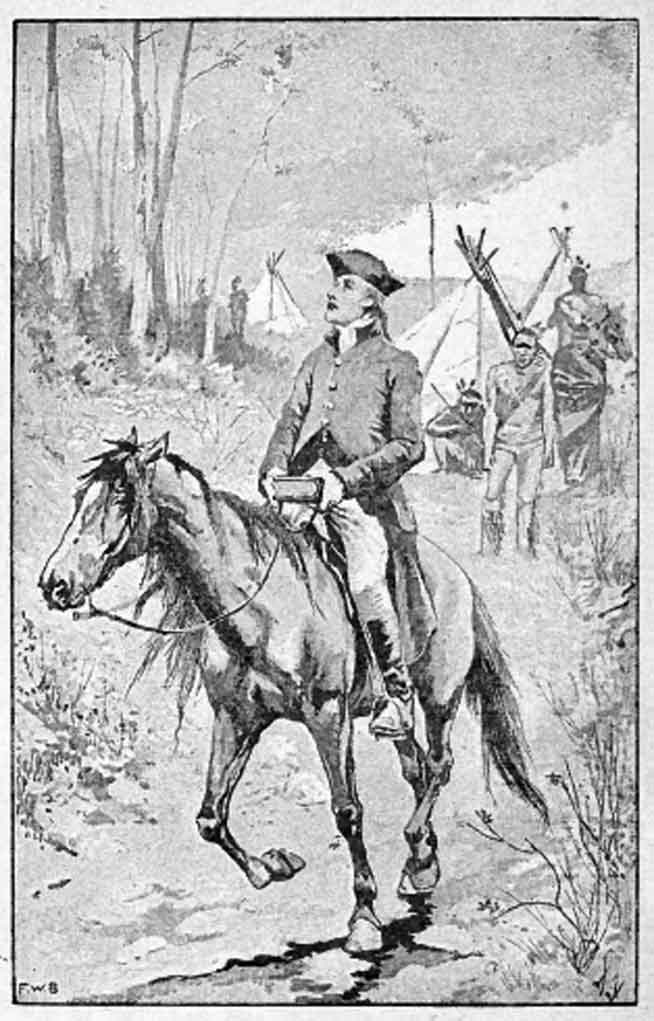
David Brainerd on horseback. He travelled over 3000 miles on horseback as a missionary.

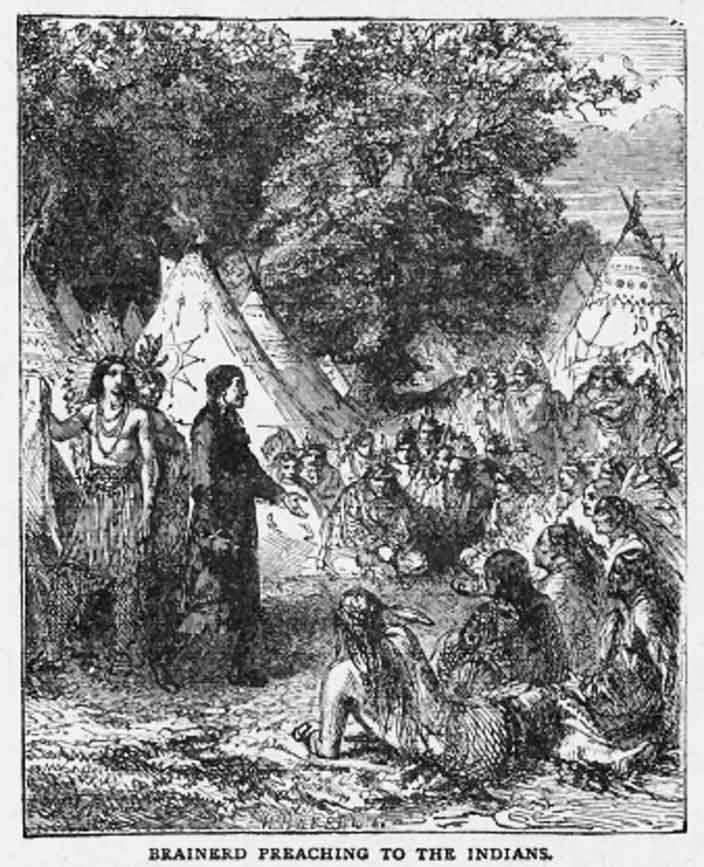
Brainerd preaching in the open-air to Native Americans.

David Brainerd was born on April 20, 1718, in Haddam, Connecticut, the son of Hezekiah Brainerd, a Connecticut legislator, and Dorothy Hobart. He had nine siblings, one of whom was Dorothy's from a previous marriage. He was orphaned a month before his fourteenth birthday. His father died in 1727 at the age of 46 and his mother died five years later.

After his mother's death, Brainerd moved to East Haddam to live with one of his older sisters, Jerusha. At the age of nineteen, he inherited a farm near Durham, but returned to East Haddam a year later to prepare to enter Yale. On July 12, 1739, he recorded having an experience of "unspeakable glory" that prompted in him a "hearty desire to exalt [God], to set him on the throne and to 'seek first his Kingdom'" This has been interpreted by evangelical scholars as a conversion experience.

== Preparing for ministry ==
Two months later, he enrolled at Yale. In his second year at Yale, he was sent home because he was suffering from a serious illness, tuberculosis, that caused him to spit blood. When he returned in November 1740, tensions were beginning to emerge at Yale between the faculty staff and the students as the staff considered the spiritual enthusiasm of the students, which had been prompted by visiting preachers such as George Whitefield, Gilbert Tennent, Ebenezer Pemberton and James Davenport, to be excessive. Brainerd was expelled because of comments about the impious staff.

A recent law forbade the appointment of ministers in Connecticut unless they had graduated from Harvard, Yale, or a European institution, so Brainerd had to reconsider his plans. In 1742, Brainerd was licensed to preach by a group of evangelicals known as New Lights. As a result, he gained the attention of Jonathan Dickinson, the leading Presbyterian in New Jersey, who unsuccessfully attempted to reinstate Brainerd at Yale. Instead, Dickinson suggested that Brainerd devote himself to missionary work among the Native Americans, supported by the Society in Scotland for Propagating Christian Knowledge. He was approved for this missionary work on November 25, 1742.

== Entering mission ==
On April 1, 1743, after a brief period serving a church on Long Island, Brainerd began working as a missionary to Native Americans, which he would continue until late 1746 when he became too ill. In his late life, he also experienced depression, loneliness, and lack of food.

His first missionary assignment was working at Kaunameek, a Mohican settlement near present-day Nassau, New York. Brainerd remained there for one year.

In 1743, he was reassigned to work among the Delaware Indians along the Delaware River northeast of Bethlehem, Pennsylvania, where he remained for another year, during which he was ordained by the Newark Presbytery. After this, he moved to Crossweeksung in New Jersey. Within a year, the Native American church at Crossweeksung had 130 members, who moved in 1746 to Cranbury where they established a Christian community.

In these years, he refused several offers of leaving the mission field to become a church minister. He continued his work converting Native Americans, writing in his diary:

'[I] could have no freedom in the thought of any other circumstances or business in life: All my desire was the conversion of the heathen, and all my hope was in God: God does not suffer me to please or comfort myself with hopes of seeing friends, returning to my dear acquaintance, and enjoying worldly comforts'.

== Death ==
In November 1746, he became too ill to continue ministering, and so moved to Jonathan Dickinson's house in Elizabethtown and later to Jonathan Edwards' house in Northampton, Massachusetts. Apart from a trip to Boston in the summer of that year, he remained at Edwards's house until his death the following year. In May 1747, he was diagnosed with incurable consumption. In his diary entry for September 24, Brainerd wrote:

'In the greatest distress that ever I endured having an uncommon kind of hiccough; which either strangled me or threw me into a straining to vomit'.

During this time, he was nursed by Jerusha Edwards, Jonathan's seventeen-year-old daughter. The friendship grew between them and "many speculate that there was deep (even romantic) love between them". He died from tuberculosis on October 9, 1747, at the age of 29. Jerusha died in February 1748 as a result of contracting tuberculosis from nursing Brainerd.

After his death, his younger brother John Brainerd continued his work.

== Legacy ==
=== Impact on the church and mission ===
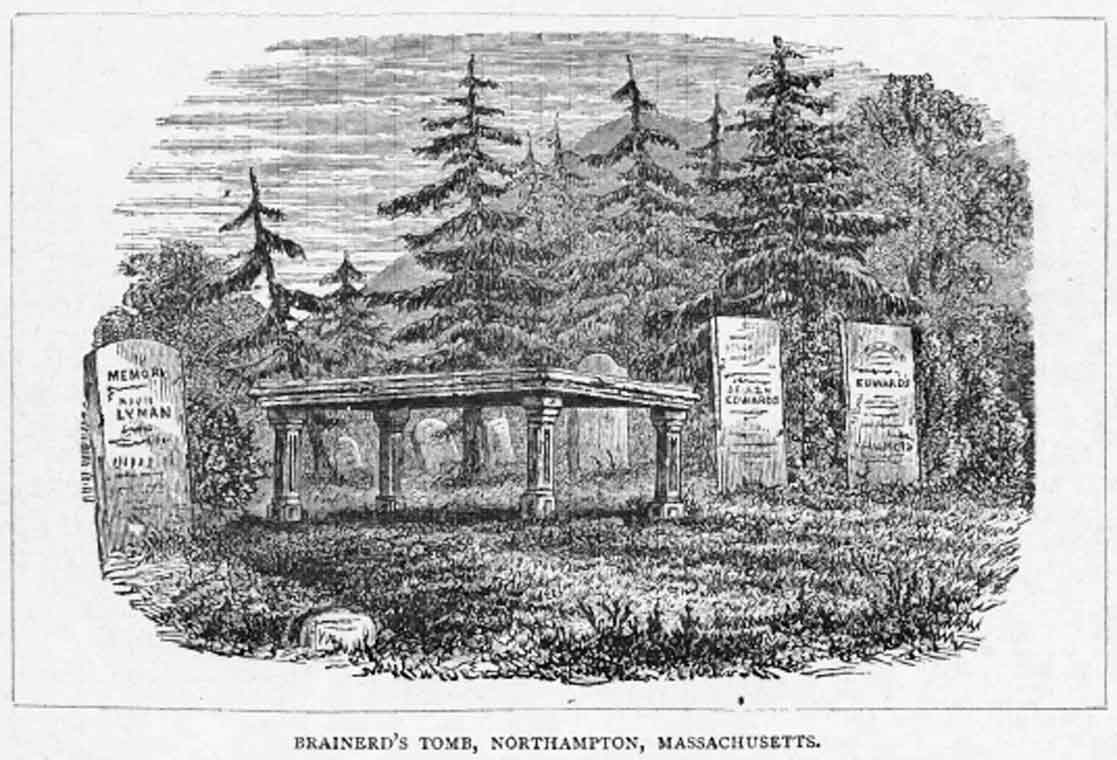
Brainerd's tomb in Northampton, Massachusetts.

He made a handful of converts, but became widely known in the 1800s due to books about him. His Journal was published in two parts in 1746 by the Scottish Society for Promoting Christian Knowledge.

Much of Brainerd's influence on future generations can be attributed to the biography compiled by Jonathan Edwards and first published in 1749 under the title of An Account of the Life of the Late Reverend Mr. David Brainerd. It gained immediate recognition, with eighteenth-century theologian John Wesley urging: 'Let every preacher read carefully over the Life of David Brainerd'. From the eighteenth century, missionaries also found inspiration and encouragement from the biography. Gideon Hawley wrote in the midst of struggles:

'I need, greatly need, something more than humane [human or natural] to support me. I read my Bible and Mr. Brainerd's Life, the only books I brought with me, and from them have a little support'.

Other missionaries who have asserted the influence of Jonathan Edwards's biography of Brainerd on their lives include Henry Martyn, William Carey, Jim Elliot, and Adoniram Judson.

=== Impact on higher education ===
Brainerd's life also played a role in the establishment of Princeton College and Dartmouth College. The 'College of New Jersey' (later Princeton) was founded due to the dissatisfaction of the New York and New Jersey Presbyterian Synods with Yale; their expulsion of Brainerd and subsequent refusal to readmit him was an important factor in driving individuals such as Jonathan Dickinson and Aaron Burr to act on this dissatisfaction. Indeed, classes began in Dickinson's house in May 1747, while Brainerd was recovering there. Dartmouth College originated from a school founded by Eleazar Wheelock for Native Americans and colonists in 1748, and Wheelock had been inspired by Brainerd's example of Native American education.

Students at Lafayette College founded the Brainerd Evangelical Society based on Brainerd's teachings in order to "promote Christian Missions and the Evangelization of the World". In 1902, they constructed a building known as Brainerd Hall (now Hogg Hall) to house their religious meetings, and serve as a recreational facility on campus.

== Archival collections ==
The Presbyterian Historical Society in Philadelphia, Pennsylvania, has papers for David Brainerd that consist of a letter by Brainerd (c. 1743) to Rev. Joseph Bellamy and notes concerning Brainerd's published works by Rev. Arthur Bennett, an Anglican clergyman.

== See also ==
- Moses Tunda Tatamy (ca. 1690–1760), the first Native American baptized by Brainerd.
- Brainerd Mission to the Cherokee Indians (1817–1838)
- Brainerd missionay family:
  David Brainerd (1718 – 1747)
  John Brainerd (missionary) (1720 – 1781)
  James Brainerd Taylor (1801–1829)
  Thomas Brainerd (1804- 1866)

== Bibliography ==
- Edwards, Jonathan (1885). The life of David Brainerd. New Haven: Yale University Press.
- Grigg, John A., The Lives of David Brainerd: The Making of an American Evangelical Icon (Oxford, OUP, 2009).
- Kilby, Clyde, 'David Brainerd: Knight of the Grail', in Russell T. Hitt (ed.), Heroic Colonial Christians (Philadelphia, 1966)
- Nichols, Heidi L., 'Those exceptional Edwards women', Christian History & Biography, 77 (2003)
- Noll, Mark, 'Jonathan Edwards: Christian history timeline – Passing the torch', Christian History & Biography, 77 (2003)
- Pettit, Norman, 'Prelude to mission: Brainerd's expulsion from Yale', The New England Quarterly, 59 (1986), pp. 28–50
- Piper, John (2001). 'Tested By Fire: The Fruit of Suffering in the Lives of John Bunyan, William Cowper and David Brainerd. Inter-Varsity Press. ISBN 978-0-8511-1553-5.
- Styles, John (1820). The life of David Brainerd, missionary to the Indians, with an abridgment of his diary and journal. London: F. Westley.
