= James Brainerd Taylor =

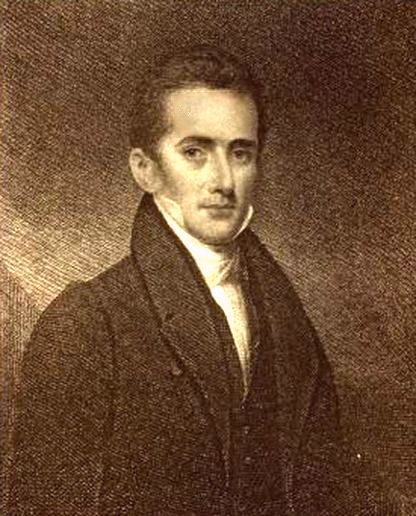
James Brainerd Taylor

James Brainerd Taylor, (1801–1829) was a Presbyterian minister and missionary and the primary founder of what is now the Princeton Christian Fellowship at Princeton University. He was a highly influential voice during the Second Great Awakening, bringing or winning back many thousands of people to the Christian faith.

== Early life ==
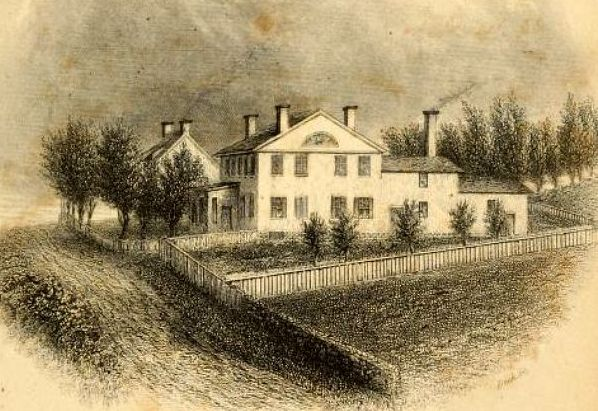
Boyhood home of James Brainerd Taylor in Connecticut

Taylor was born on April 15, 1801, the son of Colonel Jeremiah Taylor of Middle-Haddam, Connecticut, and Mother, Ann Brainerd Taylor. Both his parents were highly respected members of the Protestant Episcopal Church. Taylor was a cousin of David Brainerd, a noted Presbyterian minister and missionary to the Native Americans among the Delaware Indians of New Jersey.

== Ministry ==
Taylor arrived at the Lawrenceville School in New Jersey on January 13, 1820, and undertook a preparatory course for entering college. Upon his graduation in 1826, he entered the Yale Theological Seminary. After an initial entrance examination Taylor was examined and admitted a sophomore at the college of Nassau Hall, in Princeton, New Jersey where he studied for three years.

James' older brother, Knowles, arranged for James to find employment as a clerk in the store of a merchant in New-York, during which time life in a big city proved distracting and not in accord with his moral values. Subsequently, he was growing disenchanted with his faith, which did not go unnoticed by his two elder brothers who attentively watched over him giving him spiritual council and guidance. After regaining his faith James decided to attend the ministry of the Rev. Dr. John B. Romeyn, co-founder of the Princeton Theological Seminary, pastor of the church then in Cedar-street, New-York; and there, at the age of fifteen, publicly professed his faith in Christ.

In 1828 Taylor became licensed to preach by the Middlesex Association at East Haddam to hold services in the Haddam territory At this time his health was beginning to worsen where he resolved to spend the winter at the Theological Seminary in Richmond, Virginia. Taylor died of tuberculosis at a relatively young age on March 29, 1829, in his home in Virginia, at the age of 27.

== Legacy ==
Taylor was known for his fervent preaching and as the primary founder of what is now the Princeton Christian Fellowship at Princeton University.

In his memoirs, published posthumously by Reverend John Holt Rice in 1833, Taylor gives an account of his life, his conversion to his faith and his proprietary aspirations in this capacity.

Taylor admired the writings of John Wesley, the principle founder of the Methodist Church and recorded his impressions of his life and works in his memoirs: In one definitive entry Taylor writes:

I have recently read Mr. Wesley's "Plain Account of Christian Perfection," a book I never saw until lately. I find some expressions in it to which I should object, but I believe it is rather the expression than the sentiments. And I think, with this abatement, it is an admirable book, and I wish every member of this church would read it.

So impressed with Taylor's vocational commitment, John and Benjamin Rice subsequently published a journal article in 1934 of taylor's short lived missionary life and used such information as a definitive example of missionary endeavors for seminary students and those involved in the gospel ministry to study.

Charles Grandison Finney, a Presbyterian minister and leader in the Second Great Awakening, said of Taylor's memoirs:

I would also recommend the memoir of James Brainerd Taylor,
and I wish every Christian would get it, and study it.

== See also ==
- First Great Awakening]
- Second Great Awakening
- Third Great Awakening]
- Asahel Nettleton — American theologian, and Evangelist, highly influential during the Second Great Awakening.
- Brainerd missionay family:
  David Brainerd (1718 – 1747)
  John Brainerd (1720 – 1781)
  James Brainerd Taylor (1801–1829)
  Thomas Brainerd (1804- 1866))

== Bibliography ==
- Brainerd, Thomas (1865). The life of John Brainerd : the brother of David Brainerd, and his successor as missionary to the Indians of New Jersey. New York: Presbyterian Publication Committee.
- Brainerd, David (2006). Edwards, Jonathan (ed.). The Life and Diary of David Brainerd. Hendrickson Publishers. ISBN 978-1-5985-6053-4.
- Kyle, I Francis (2008). An uncommon Christian : James Brainerd Taylor, forgotten evangelist in America's second Great Awakening. Lanham, MD : University Press of America. ISBN 978-0-7618-3862-3.
- Conforti, Joseph (June 1985). "Jonathan Edwards's Most Popular Work: "The Life of David Brainerd" and Nineteenth-Century Evangelical Culture". Church History. 54 (2): 188–201. doi:10.2307/3167235. JSTOR 3167235.
- Graves, Dan. "James Brainerd Taylor Gave All to the Lord". Christian History Institute.
- Piper, John (2001). Tested by fire : the fruit of suffering in the lives of John Bunyan, William Cowper and David Brainerd. Leicester : Inter-Varsity. ISBN 9780851115535.
- Taylor, James Brainerd (1838). A New Tribute to the Memory of James Brainerd Taylor. New York, J. S. Taylor.
- Rice, John Holt (1833). Memoir of James Brainerd Taylor. New York, The American tract society.
- Finney, Charles G. "The Princeton Review of Memoir of James Brainerd Taylor". The Princeton Review. 6 (1). Princeton University Press: 51–58.
