= Oklahoma's 2nd congressional district =

U.S. House district for Oklahoma

Coordinates: 35.0°N 95.7°W

- Interactive map of district boundaries since January 3, 2023
- Representative: Josh Brecheen; R–Coalgate
- Distribution: 64.49% rural; 35.51% urban
- Population (2025): 816,596
- Median household income: $59,047
- Ethnicity: 60.5% White; 18.0% Native American; 11.8% Two or more races; 5.6% Hispanic; 3.0% Black; 0.7% Asian; 0.4% other
- Cook PVI: R+28

Oklahoma's 2nd congressional district is one of five United States congressional districts in Oklahoma and covers approximately one-fourth of the state in the east. The district borders Arkansas, Kansas, Missouri, and Texas and includes (in whole or in part) a total of 24 counties. With a Cook Partisan Voting Index rating of R+28, it is the most Republican district in Oklahoma, a state with an all-Republican congressional delegation.

Historically, the district has supported conservative Democrats, and was reckoned as a classic Yellow dog Democrat district. However, the growing Republican trend in the state has overtaken the district since the start of the 21st century. In the last two elections, the Republican presidential candidate has carried it by the largest margin in the state. Urban voters comprise a third of the district.

The district is represented by Republican Josh Brecheen, becoming only the third Republican to hold the seat since 1923. Brecheen was first elected in 2022, following the retirement of five-term Republican incumbent Markwayne Mullin, who was elected to the United States Senate.

== Geography ==
The district borders Kansas to the north, Missouri and Arkansas to the east, and Texas (along the Red River) to the south. It covers all or part of 26 counties. It includes the remainder of Rogers County (including the county seat of Claremore) that is not included in the 1st district, and then, also, all of the following counties: Adair, Nowata, Craig, Ottawa, Mayes, Delaware, Cherokee, Okmulgee, Muskogee, Sequoyah, Okfuskee, McIntosh, Haskell, LeFlore, Hughes, Pittsburg, Latimer, Coal, Atoka, Pushmataha, McCurtain, Choctaw, Bryan, Marshall and Johnston.

Some of the principal cities in the district include Miami, Claremore, Muskogee, Tahlequah, Okmulgee, McAlester, and Durant.

The northern half of the district includes most of the area of Oklahoma referred to as Green Country, while the southern half of the district includes a part of Oklahoma often referred to as Little Dixie. It contains the majority of lands in the Choctaw Nation and the Cherokee Nation, as well as smaller parts of the Creek and Chickasaw nations.

== History ==
In the 20th century, the district heavily favored conservative Democratic candidates, being represented in the House only by Democrats from 1923 to 1994. The district's Democratic leanings stem partly from historic migration patterns into the state– the Little Dixie region of the district imported the people and culture of southern states such as Mississippi after Reconstruction. Voter registration in Little Dixie ran as high as 90 percent Democratic in the past. Additionally, Native Americans in the region tend to vote for Democratic candidates and they have helped Democratic candidates win statewide elections.

The district first shifted Republican in electing Tom Coburn in 1994, who vacated the seat due to a self-imposed term limit pledge (he was elected to the United States Senate 4 years later). It was held by conservative Democrats Brad Carson and Dan Boren from 2001 to 2012. Since the 2012 election, the 2nd district has been safely Republican at all levels including the House: it was represented by Markwayne Mullin from 2013. Mullin assumed office as a U.S. Senator in 2023, and was succeeded as the Representative from the 2nd district by fellow Republican Josh Brecheen.

Presidentially, this was the best-performing district for Democrats in the 20th century; Bill Clinton was the last Democratic presidential candidate to win the district, easily carrying it in 1992 and 1996. Since then it has been safely Republican: George W. Bush received 59 percent of the vote in this district in 2004, John McCain received 66 percent of the vote in this district in 2008, and in 2020, Donald Trump won one of the highest percentages for a Republican presidential candidate, winning 76% of the vote to only 22% for the Democratic candidate Joe Biden. Muskogee has produced six representatives, more than any other city in the district. Tahlequah has produced three representatives, the second most of any city in the district.

According to the 2000 U.S. census, the district is 35.51 percent urban, 23.95 percent non-white, and has a population that is 2.40 percent Latino and 1.36 percent foreign-born. The district has a higher percentage of Native Americans than any other congressional district in Oklahoma. Its representative, Josh Brecheen, is one of four Native Americans currently serving in Congress.

== Recent election results from statewide races ==
Year	Office	Results
2000	President	Bush 53% - 47%
2004	President	Bush 59% - 41%
2008	President	McCain 65% - 33%
2012	President	Romney 68% - 32%
2016	President	Trump 73% - 23%
2016	Senate	Lankford 70% - 24%
2018	Governor	Stitt 60% - 37%
2018	Lt. Governor	Pinnell 67% - 30%
2018	Attorney General	Hunter 69% - 31%
2020	President	Trump 76% - 22%
2020	Senate	Inhofe 72% - 24%
2022	Senate (Reg.)	Lankford 73% - 23%
2022	Senate (Spec.)	Mullin 73% - 25%
2022	Governor	Stitt 63% - 34%
2022	Lt. Governor	Pinnell 73% - 23%
2022	Treasurer	Russ 73% - 23%
2024	President	Trump 77% - 21%

== Composition ==
For the 118th and successive Congresses (based on redistricting following the 2020 census), the district contains all or portions of the following counties and communities:

Adair County (30)

All 15 communities

Atoka County (6)

All 6 communities

Bryan County (19)

All 19 communities

Cherokee County (33)

All 33 communities

Choctaw County (7)

All 7 communities

Coal County (7)

All 7 communities

Craig County (6)

All 6 communities

Delaware County (32)

All 32 communities

Haskell County (9)

All 9 communities

Hughes County (12)

All 12 communities

Johnston County (14)

All 14 communities

Latimer County (5)

All 5 communities

LeFlore County (20)

All 20 communities

McCurtain County (11)

All 11 communities

McIntosh County (10)

All 10 communities

Marshall County (8)

All 8 communities

Mayes County (29)

All 29 communities

Muskogee County (20)

All 20 communities

Nowata County (6)

All 6 communities

Okfuskee County (9)

All 9 communities

Ottawa County (10)

All 10 communities

Pittsburg County (23)

All 23 communities

Pushmataha County (8)

All 8 communities

Rogers County (16)

Bushyhead, Chelsea, Claremore, Collinsville, Fair Oaks (part; also 2nd; shared with Wagoner County), Foyil, Gregory, Inola, Justice, Limestone (part; also 1st), Oologah, Talala, Tiawah, Tulsa (part; also 1st and 3rd; shared with Osage, Tulsa, and Wagoner counties), Valley Park, Verdigris

Sequoyah County (33)

All 33 communities

Wagoner County (7)

Mallard Bay, Okay, Rocky Point, Taylor Ferry, Toppers, Wagoner, Whitehorn Cove

Washington County (6)

All 6 communities

== Recent election results ==
=== 2004 ===
2004 Oklahoma's 2nd congressional district election
Party	Candidate	Votes	%
Democratic	Dan Boren	179,579	65.9%
Republican	Wayland Smalley	92,963	34.1%
Total votes		272,542	100.00%
Democratic hold			

=== 2006 ===
2006 Oklahoma's 2nd congressional district election
Party	Candidate	Votes	%
Democratic	Dan Boren (Incumbent)	122,347	72.7%
Republican	Patrick K. Miller	45,861	27.3%
Total votes		168,208	100.00%
Democratic hold			

=== 2008 ===
2008 Oklahoma's 2nd congressional district election
Party	Candidate	Votes	%
Democratic	Dan Boren (Incumbent)	173,757	70.5%
Republican	Raymond J. Wickson	72,815	29.5%
Total votes		246,572	100.00%
Democratic hold			

=== 2010 ===
2010 Oklahoma's 2nd congressional district election
Party	Candidate	Votes	%
Democratic	Dan Boren (Incumbent)	108,203	56.5%
Republican	Charles Thompson	83,226	43.5%
Total votes		191,429	100.00%
Democratic hold			

=== 2012 ===
Oklahoma's 2nd congressional district, 2012
Party	Candidate	Votes	%
Republican	Markwayne Mullin	143,701	57.3%
Democratic	Rob Wallace	96,081	38.3%
Independent	Michael G. Fulks	10,830	4.3%
Total votes		250,612	100.0%
Republican gain from Democratic			

=== 2014 ===
Oklahoma's 2nd congressional district, 2014
Party	Candidate	Votes	%
Republican	Markwayne Mullin (Incumbent)	110,925	70.0%
Democratic	Earl Everett	38,964	24.6%
Independent	Jon Douthitt	8,518	5.4%
Total votes		158,407	100.0%
Republican hold			

=== 2016 ===
Oklahoma's 2nd congressional district, 2016
Party	Candidate	Votes	%
Republican	Markwayne Mullin (Incumbent)	189,839	70.6%
Democratic	Joshua Harris-Till	62,387	23.2%
Independent	John McCarthy	16,644	6.2%
Total votes		268,870	100.0%
Republican hold			

=== 2018 ===
Oklahoma's 2nd congressional district, 2018
Party	Candidate	Votes	%
Republican	Markwayne Mullin (Incumbent)	140,451	65.0%
Democratic	Jason Nichols	65,021	30.1%
Independent	John Foreman	6,390	3.0%
Libertarian	Richard Castaldo	4,140	1.9%
Total votes		216,002	100.0%
Republican hold			

=== 2020 ===
Oklahoma's 2nd congressional district, 2020
Party	Candidate	Votes	%
Republican	Markwayne Mullin (incumbent)	216,511	75.0
Democratic	Danyell Lanier	63,472	22.0
Libertarian	Richie Castaldo	8,544	3.0
Total votes		288,527	100.0
Republican hold			

=== 2022 ===
Oklahoma's 2nd congressional district, 2022
Party	Candidate	Votes	%
Republican	Josh Brecheen	167,843	72.4
Democratic	Naomi Andrews	54,194	23.3
Independent	Ben Robinson	9,635	4.1
Total votes		231,672	100.0
Republican hold			

=== 2024 ===
2024 Oklahoma's 2nd congressional district election results
Party	Candidate	Votes	%
Republican	Josh Brecheen (incumbent)	238,123	74.18%
Democratic	Brandon Wade	68,841	21.44%
Independent	Ronnie Hopkins	14,061	4.38%
Total votes		321,025	100%
Republican hold			

== List of members representing the district ==
Name	Party	Years	Cong ress	Electoral history
District established November 15, 1907
Elmer L. Fulton (Oklahoma City)	Democratic	November 16, 1907 – March 3, 1909	60th	Elected in 1907. Lost re-election.
Dick T. Morgan (Woodward)	Republican	March 4, 1909 – March 3, 1915	61st 62nd 63rd	Elected in 1908. Re-elected in 1910. Re-elected in 1912. Redistricted to the 8th district.
William Hastings (Tahlequah)	Democratic	March 4, 1915 – March 3, 1921	64th 65th 66th	Elected in 1914. Re-elected in 1916. Re-elected in 1918. Lost re-election.
Alice Robertson (Muskogee)	Republican	March 4, 1921 – March 3, 1923	67th	Elected in 1920. Lost re-election.
William Hastings (Tahlequah)	Democratic	March 4, 1923 – January 3, 1935	68th 69th 70th 71st 72nd 73rd	Elected again in 1922. Re-elected in 1924. Re-elected in 1926. Re-elected in 1928. Re-elected in 1930. Re-elected in 1932. Retired.
John C. Nichols (Eufaula)	Democratic	January 3, 1935 – July 3, 1943	74th 75th 76th 77th 78th	Elected in 1934. Re-elected in 1936. Re-elected in 1938. Re-elected in 1940. Re-elected in 1942. Resigned to become vice president of Transcontinental & Western Air, Inc.
Vacant		July 3, 1943 – March 28, 1944	78th	
William G. Stigler (Stigler)	Democratic	March 28, 1944 – August 21, 1952	78th 79th 80th 81st 82nd	Elected to finish Nichols's term. Re-elected in 1944. Re-elected in 1946. Re-elected in 1948. Re-elected in 1950. Died.
Vacant		August 21, 1952 – January 3, 1953	82nd	
Ed Edmondson (Muskogee)	Democratic	January 3, 1953 – January 3, 1973	83rd 84th 85th 86th 87th 88th 89th 90th 91st 92nd	Elected in 1952. Re-elected in 1954. Re-elected in 1956. Re-elected in 1958. Re-elected in 1960. Re-elected in 1962. Re-elected in 1964. Re-elected in 1966. Re-elected in 1968. Re-elected in 1970. Retired to run for U.S. Senator.
Clem McSpadden (Claremore)	Democratic	January 3, 1973 – January 3, 1975	93rd	Elected in 1972. Retired to run for Governor of Oklahoma.
Ted Risenhoover (Tahlequah)	Democratic	January 3, 1975 – January 3, 1979	94th 95th	Elected in 1974. Re-elected in 1976. Lost renomination.
Mike Synar (Muskogee)	Democratic	January 3, 1979 – January 3, 1995	96th 97th 98th 99th 100th 101st 102nd 103rd	Elected in 1978. Re-elected in 1980. Re-elected in 1982. Re-elected in 1984. Re-elected in 1986. Re-elected in 1988. Re-elected in 1990. Re-elected in 1992. Lost renomination.
Tom Coburn (Muskogee)	Republican	January 3, 1995 – January 3, 2001	104th 105th 106th	Elected in 1994. Re-elected in 1996. Re-elected in 1998. Retired to practice medicine.
Brad Carson (Claremore)	Democratic	January 3, 2001 – January 3, 2005	107th 108th	Elected in 2000. Re-elected in 2002. Retired to run for U.S. Senator.
Dan Boren (Muskogee)	Democratic	January 3, 2005 – January 3, 2013	109th 110th 111th 112th	Elected in 2004. Re-elected in 2006. Re-elected in 2008. Re-elected in 2010. Retired.
Markwayne Mullin (Westville)	Republican	January 3, 2013 – January 3, 2023	113th 114th 115th 116th 117th	Elected in 2012. Re-elected in 2014. Re-elected in 2016. Re-elected in 2018. Re-elected in 2020. Retired to run for U.S. Senator.
Josh Brecheen (Coalgate)	Republican	January 3, 2023 – present	118th 119th	Elected in 2022. Re-elected in 2024. Re-elected in 2026.

== Historical district boundaries ==
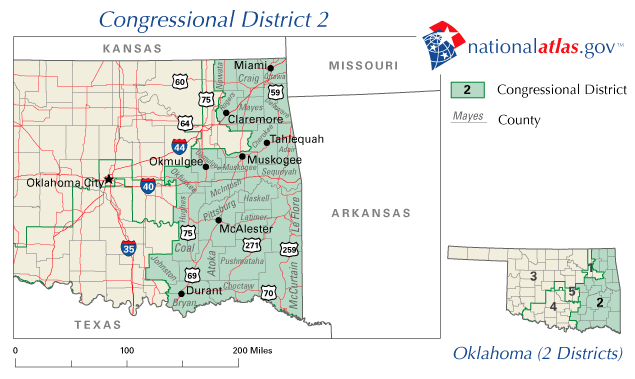
2003–2013

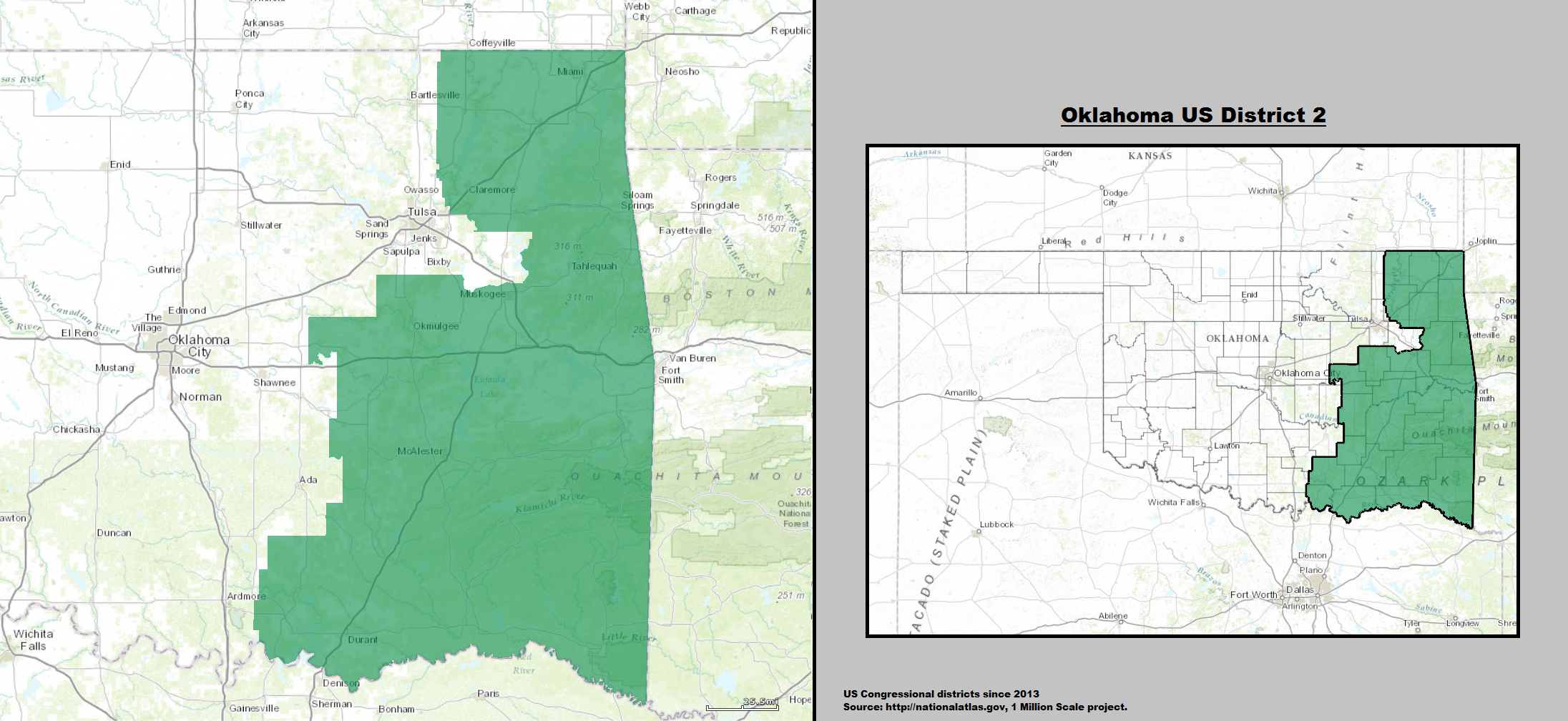
2013–2023

== See also ==
- Oklahoma's congressional districts
- List of United States congressional districts
