= Wagoner County, Oklahoma =

County in Oklahoma, United States

- County
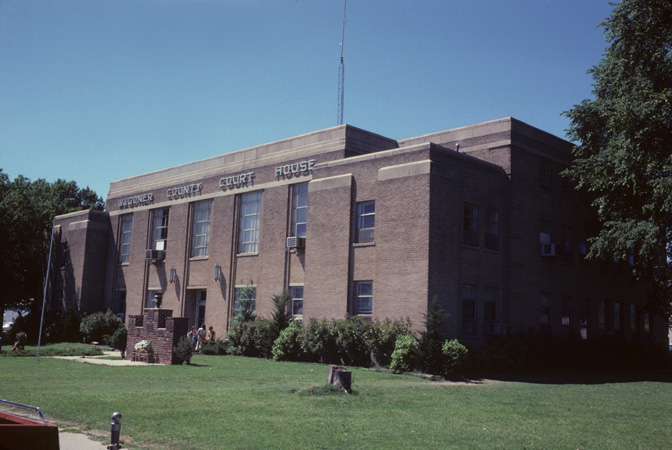
- Wagoner County Courthouse in Wagoner

- Location within the U.S. state of Oklahoma
- Coordinates: 35°58′N 95°31′W
- Country: United States
- State: Oklahoma
- Founded: 1907
- Named for: Henry "Bigfoot" Wagoner
- Seat: Wagoner
- Largest city: Coweta

Area
  - Total: 591 sq mi (1,530 km^{2})
  - Land: 562 sq mi (1,460 km^{2})
  - Water: 29 sq mi (75 km^{2}) 4.9%

Population (2020)
  - Total: 80,981
  - Estimate (2025): 93,263 ▲
  - Density: 144/sq mi (55.6/km^{2})
- Time zone: UTC−6 (Central)
  - Summer (DST): UTC−5 (CDT)
- Congressional districts: 1st, 2nd
- Website: www.wagonercounty.ok.gov

Wagoner County is a county located in the U.S. state of Oklahoma. As of the 2020 census, the population was 80,981. Its county seat is Wagoner. Wagoner County is included in the Tulsa metropolitan area.

== History ==
According to archaeological studies, this area was inhabited by Caddoan Mound Builders during 300 to 1200 AD.

The western area of Wagoner County was settled by the Creek after their forced removal in Alabama in the 1820s. The eastern portion of the county was settled by the Cherokee.

During the Civil War in 1865, the present county was the scene of the Battle of Flat Rock (also known as the Hay Camp Action). Confederate troops led by Brig. General Stand Watie and Brig. General Richard Gano captured 85 Union troops and killed even more who were harvesting hay.

In 1905, the Sequoyah Convention proposed creating two counties from this area. The western half would be named Coweta and the eastern half would have been named Tumechichee. However, failure of the attempt to create the state of Sequoyah negated the proposal. In 1907 at Oklahoma statehood, Wagoner County was organized. The towns of Porter and Coweta vied with Wagoner as the county seat. The county was named after the town of Wagoner, which won the election. The town was named after Henry "Bigfoot" Wagoner, a Katy Railroad dispatcher from Parsons, Kansas.

== Geography ==
According to the U.S. Census Bureau, the county has a total area of 591 sq mi (1,530 km^{2}), of which 29 sq mi (75 km^{2}) (4.9%) are covered by water. It is part of the Ozark Highlands. The Verdigris River divides the east and west parts of the county. The Arkansas River forms part of the western and southern boundaries. Grand River also flows south through the county. It was dammed in 1942 to create Fort Gibson Lake.

=== Adjacent counties ===
- Rogers County (northwest)
- Mayes County (northeast)
- Cherokee County (east)
- Muskogee County (south)
- Tulsa County (west)

== Demographics ==
Historical population
| Census | Pop. | Note | %± |
|---|---|---|---|
| 1910 | 22,086 | | — |
| 1920 | 21,371 | | −3.2% |
| 1930 | 22,428 | | 4.9% |
| 1940 | 21,642 | | −3.5% |
| 1950 | 16,741 | | −22.6% |
| 1960 | 15,673 | | −6.4% |
| 1970 | 22,163 | | 41.4% |
| 1980 | 41,801 | | 88.6% |
| 1990 | 47,883 | | 14.5% |
| 2000 | 57,491 | | 20.1% |
| 2010 | 73,085 | | 27.1% |
| 2020 | 80,981 | | 10.8% |
| 2025 (est.) | 93,263 | ▲ | 15.2% |
U.S. Decennial Census; 1790-1960 1900-1990; 1990-2000 2010-2019

=== 2021 estimates ===
As of the 2022 census estimate, the county had a population of 86,644, and as of 2021 census estimates, its racial and ethnic makeup was 69.4% non-Hispanic white, 3.8% African American, 10.9% Native American, 2% Asian, 0.1% Pacific Islander, 7.7% multiracial, and 7.6% Hispanic or Latino of any race. As of 2021, its median household income grew to $68,906 with a poverty rate of 9.7%.

=== 2020 census ===
As of the 2020 census, the county had a population of 80,981. Of the residents, 25.3% were under the age of 18 and 16.9% were 65 years of age or older; the median age was 39.1 years. For every 100 females there were 97.5 males, and for every 100 females age 18 and over there were 95.6 males.

The racial makeup of the county was 66.8% White, 3.3% Black or African American, 10.3% American Indian and Alaska Native, 1.8% Asian, 2.9% from some other race, and 14.7% from two or more races. Hispanic or Latino residents of any race comprised 7.6% of the population.

There were 29,964 households in the county, of which 35.0% had children under the age of 18 living with them and 21.1% had a female householder with no spouse or partner present. About 20.3% of all households were made up of individuals and 9.1% had someone living alone who was 65 years of age or older.

There were 32,529 housing units, of which 7.9% were vacant. Among occupied housing units, 80.4% were owner-occupied and 19.6% were renter-occupied. The homeowner vacancy rate was 1.5% and the rental vacancy rate was 9.1%.

=== 2010 census ===
As of the census of 2010, 73,085 people were in the county. The population density was 47.7/km^{2}. The 29,694 housing units averaged 55.9 per square mile (21.6/km^{2}). The racial makeup of the county was 80.07% White, 3.75% African American, 9.38% Native American, 0.51% Asian, 0.88% from other races, and 5.41% from two or more races. Hispanics or Latinos of any race were 2.50% of the population.

Of the 21,010 households in 2010, 37.40% had children under 18 living with them, 65.90% were married couples living together, 9.80% had a female householder with no husband present, and 20.50% were not families. About 17.70% of all households were made up of individuals, and 6.70% had someone living alone who was 65 or older. The average household size was 2.73, and the average family size was 3.08. As of 2010, the age distribution was 28.10% under 18, 7.90% from 18 to 24, 28.50% from 25 to 44, 25.40% from 45 to 64, and 10.20% who were 65 age or older. The median age was 36 years. For every 100 females, there were 97.70 males. For every 100 females age 18 and over, there were 94.90 males.

As of 2010, the median income for a household in the county was $56,819, and for a family was $62,997. The per capita income for the county was $24,976. About 8.3% of families and 12.1% of the population were below the poverty line, including 18.5% of those under age 18 and 5.8% of those age 65 or over.

== Politics ==
Voter Registration and Party Enrollment as of June 30, 2023
| Party | Number of Voters | Percentage |
|---|---|---|
| Republican | 29,885 | 61.22% |
| Democratic | 11,026 | 22.60% |
| Libertarian | 415 | 0.85% |
| Unaffiliated | 7,491 | 15.35% |
| Total | 48,817 | 100% |

United States presidential election results for Wagoner County, Oklahoma
| Year | Republican | | Democratic | | Third party(ies) | |
| Year | No. | % | No. | % | No. | % |
|---|---|---|---|---|---|---|
| 1908 | 2,107 | 61.54% | 1,143 | 33.38% | 174 | 5.08% |
| 1912 | 555 | 32.55% | 888 | 52.08% | 262 | 15.37% |
| 1916 | 749 | 35.80% | 1,040 | 49.71% | 303 | 14.48% |
| 1920 | 1,432 | 48.30% | 1,375 | 46.37% | 158 | 5.33% |
| 1924 | 1,646 | 42.17% | 1,985 | 50.86% | 272 | 6.97% |
| 1928 | 2,726 | 60.62% | 1,745 | 38.80% | 26 | 0.58% |
| 1932 | 1,505 | 27.26% | 4,015 | 72.74% | 0 | 0.00% |
| 1936 | 2,119 | 41.41% | 2,977 | 58.18% | 21 | 0.41% |
| 1940 | 4,647 | 61.00% | 2,946 | 38.67% | 25 | 0.33% |
| 1944 | 3,467 | 59.29% | 2,373 | 40.58% | 8 | 0.14% |
| 1948 | 2,666 | 44.03% | 3,389 | 55.97% | 0 | 0.00% |
| 1952 | 3,321 | 52.82% | 2,966 | 47.18% | 0 | 0.00% |
| 1956 | 3,537 | 58.16% | 2,544 | 41.84% | 0 | 0.00% |
| 1960 | 3,570 | 56.87% | 2,707 | 43.13% | 0 | 0.00% |
| 1964 | 2,840 | 41.78% | 3,957 | 58.22% | 0 | 0.00% |
| 1968 | 3,187 | 41.76% | 2,183 | 28.60% | 2,262 | 29.64% |
| 1972 | 6,569 | 72.13% | 2,257 | 24.78% | 281 | 3.09% |
| 1976 | 5,071 | 45.86% | 5,879 | 53.17% | 107 | 0.97% |
| 1980 | 8,969 | 60.90% | 5,235 | 35.55% | 523 | 3.55% |
| 1984 | 12,534 | 69.97% | 5,271 | 29.43% | 108 | 0.60% |
| 1988 | 10,219 | 57.68% | 7,378 | 41.64% | 121 | 0.68% |
| 1992 | 9,053 | 42.05% | 7,041 | 32.70% | 5,435 | 25.25% |
| 1996 | 9,392 | 48.02% | 7,749 | 39.62% | 2,417 | 12.36% |
| 2000 | 12,981 | 60.33% | 8,244 | 38.31% | 292 | 1.36% |
| 2004 | 19,081 | 67.57% | 9,157 | 32.43% | 0 | 0.00% |
| 2008 | 21,441 | 70.88% | 8,810 | 29.12% | 0 | 0.00% |
| 2012 | 20,900 | 72.85% | 7,791 | 27.15% | 0 | 0.00% |
| 2016 | 23,005 | 73.50% | 6,723 | 21.48% | 1,572 | 5.02% |
| 2020 | 26,165 | 74.04% | 8,464 | 23.95% | 709 | 2.01% |
| 2024 | 28,487 | 73.99% | 9,330 | 24.23% | 684 | 1.78% |

== Communities ==
=== Cities ===
- Bixby (mostly in Tulsa County)
- Broken Arrow (also in Tulsa County)
- Catoosa (mostly in Rogers County)
- Coweta
- Tulsa (mostly in Tulsa County)
- Wagoner (county seat)

=== Towns ===
- Fair Oaks (also in Rogers County)
- Okay
- Porter
- Redbird
- Tullahassee

=== Census-designated places ===
- Clarksville
- Mallard Bay
- Rocky Point
- Taylor Ferry
- Toppers
- Whitehorn Cove

=== Other unincorporated places ===
- Choska
- Gibson
- Neodesha
- Oneta
- Stones Corner

=== Former community ===
- New Tulsa, dissolved in 2001, now part of Broken Arrow

== Education ==
School districts (all full K-12) include:

- Bixby Public Schools
- Broken Arrow Public Schools
- Catoosa Public Schools
- Chouteau-Mazie Public Schools
- Coweta Public Schools
- Fort Gibson Public Schools
- Haskell Public Schools
- Inola Public Schools
- Locust Grove Public Schools
- Okay Public Schools
- Porter Consolidated Schools
- Tulsa Public Schools
- Wagoner Public Schools

== Transportation ==
=== Major highways ===
- I-44
- US 64
- US 69
- US 412
- SH-16
- SH-51
  - SH-51B
- SH-66
- SH-72
- SH-104
- SH-251A
- Creek Turnpike
- Muskogee Turnpike

== National Register of Historic Places ==
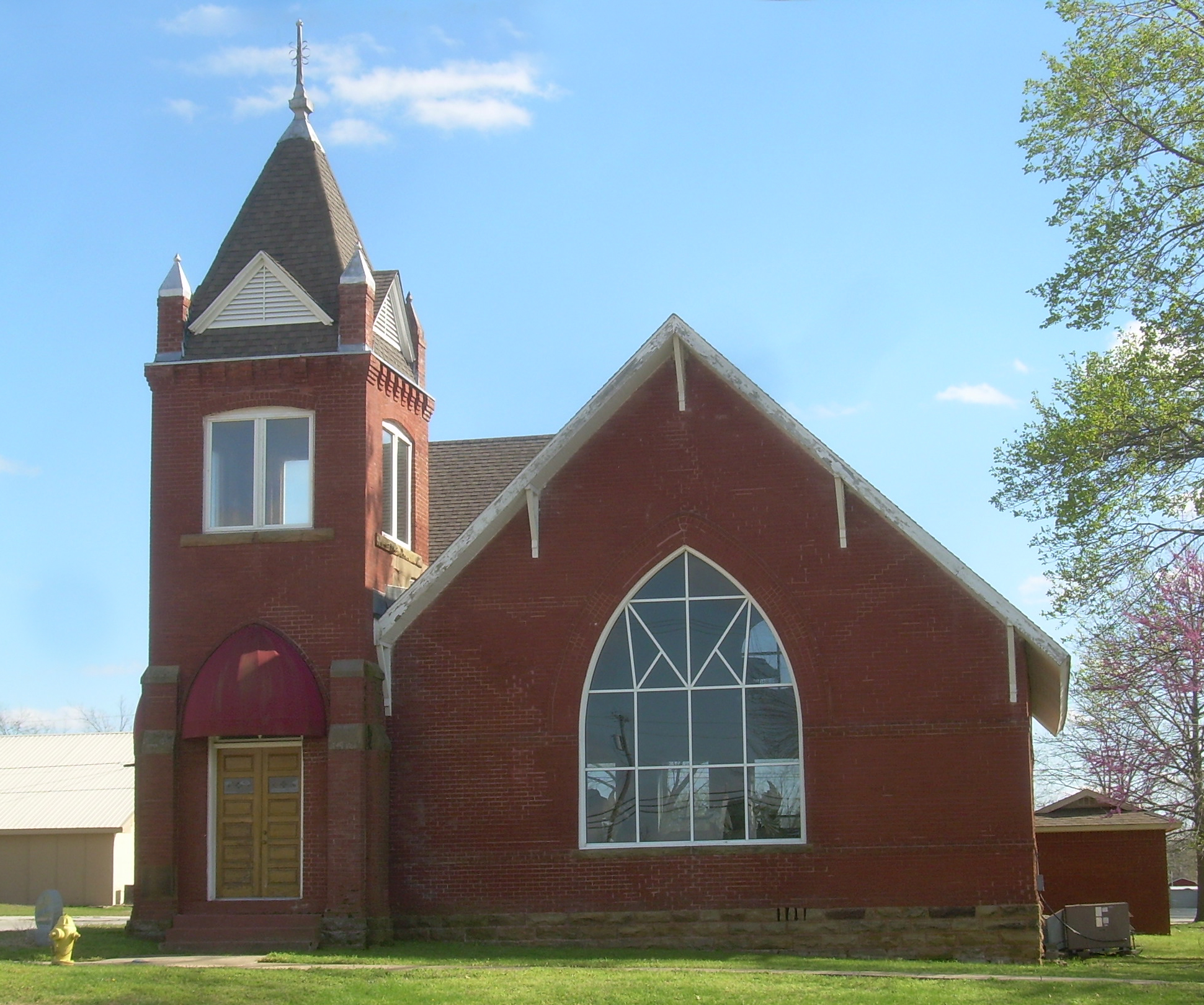
First Presbyterian Church of Coweta

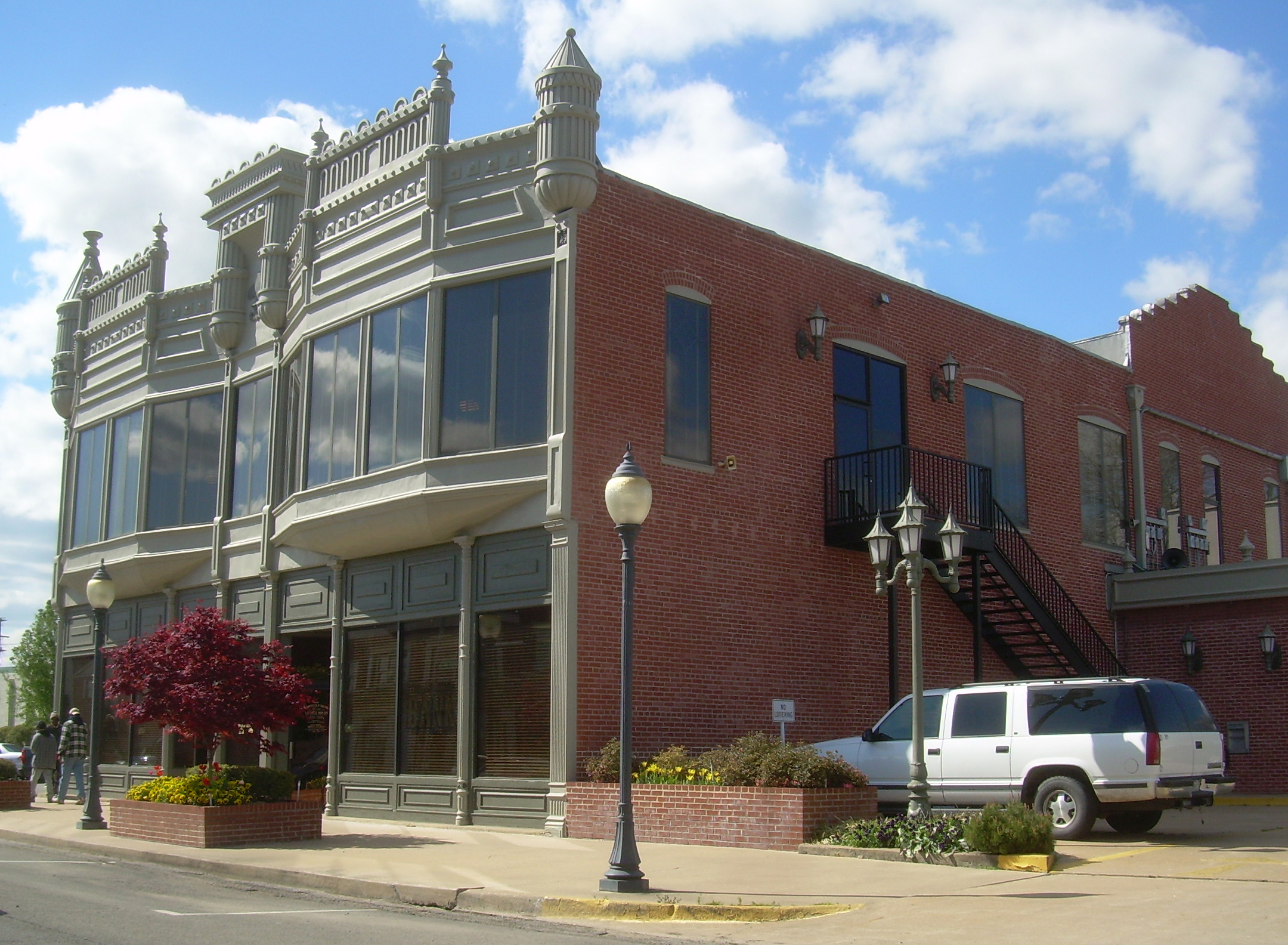
The Cobb Building

These in Wagoner County are listed on the National Register of Historic Places:

- A. J. Mason Building, Tullahassee
- Amos Parkinson House, Wagoner
- Cobb Building, Wagoner
- Collin McKinney House, Wagoner
- First National Bank of Wagoner, Wagoner
- First Presbyterian Church of Coweta, Coweta
- Frederick Parkinson House, Wagoner
- Jamison Cemetery, Okay
- John W. Gibson House, Wagoner
- Koweta Mission Site, Coweta
- Miller-Washington School, Red Bird
- Newport Hotel and Restaurant, Wagoner
- Red Bird City Hall, Red Bird
- Rio Grande Ranch Headquarters Historic District, Okay
- St James Episcopal Church, Wagoner
- Tullahassee Mission Site, Tullahassee
- Van Tuyl Homeplace, Porter
- Wagoner Armory, Wagoner
- Way House, Wagoner
- William McAnally House, Wagoner
