= Whitehorn Cove, Oklahoma =

- Census-designated place
- Location within Oklahoma Location within the United States
- Coordinates: 36°0′8″N 95°16′41″W
- Country: United States
- State: Oklahoma
- County: Wagoner

Area
  - Total: 9.93 sq mi (25.73 km^{2})
  - Land: 7.13 sq mi (18.47 km^{2})
  - Water: 2.80 sq mi (7.25 km^{2})
- Elevation: 728 ft (222 m)

Population (2020)
  - Total: 1,201
  - Density: 168.4/sq mi (65.01/km^{2})
- Time zone: UTC-6 (Central (CST))
  - Summer (DST): UTC-5 (CDT)
- ZIP Codes: 74467/74477 (Wagoner)
- Area codes: 918/539
- FIPS code: 40-80813
- GNIS feature ID: 2805363

Whitehorn Cove is an unincorporated community and census-designated place (CDP) in Wagoner County, Oklahoma, United States. It was first listed as a CDP prior to the 2020 census. As of the 2020 census, Whitehorn Cove had a population of 1,201.

The CDP is in eastern Wagoner County, on the west shore of Fort Gibson Lake, a large reservoir on the Neosho River. The CDP is bordered by Rocky Point to the north and Toppers and Taylor Ferry to the south. The CDP's southern border is the centerline of North Bay, an arm of Fort Gibson Lake. The area is known for Whitehorn Cove Marina, a 208-acre facility on Fort Gibson Lake with a landing strip, boat ramps, RV park, store and restaurant.

Whitehorn Cove is 9 miles (14 km) northeast of Wagoner, the county seat.

== Demographics ==
=== 2020 census ===
As of the 2020 census, Whitehorn Cove had a population of 1,201. The median age was 52.8 years. 15.9% of residents were under the age of 18 and 30.3% of residents were 65 years of age or older. For every 100 females there were 104.6 males, and for every 100 females age 18 and over there were 107.0 males age 18 and over.

0.0% of residents lived in urban areas, while 100.0% lived in rural areas.

There were 531 households in Whitehorn Cove, of which 18.8% had children under the age of 18 living in them. Of all households, 54.6% were married-couple households, 19.6% were households with a male householder and no spouse or partner present, and 20.0% were households with a female householder and no spouse or partner present. About 28.6% of all households were made up of individuals and 14.6% had someone living alone who was 65 years of age or older.

There were 696 housing units, of which 23.7% were vacant. The homeowner vacancy rate was 3.7% and the rental vacancy rate was 6.4%.

Racial composition as of the 2020 census
Race	Number	Percent
White	904	75.3%
Black or African American	1	0.1%
American Indian and Alaska Native	171	14.2%
Asian	2	0.2%
Native Hawaiian and Other Pacific Islander	0	0.0%
Some other race	4	0.3%
Two or more races	119	9.9%
Hispanic or Latino (of any race)	20	1.7%
