= Clarksville, Oklahoma =

Unincorporated community in Oklahoma, US

Coordinates: 35°49′32″N 95°30′51″W

Clarksville was a town in southern Wagoner County, Oklahoma, United States. It is located three miles south of Porter on N. 4210 Road.

== Geography ==
The town was located by the Arkansas River about 14 to 16 miles southwest of Wagoner, Oklahoma, and 2.5 miles south of Porter, Oklahoma. An agricultural region, a 1900 article reported that 5,000 acres of cotton were grown in the area of Clarksville.

== History and community ==
In July 1900, the Methodist pastor was Reverend Cox and the Baptist pastor was Reverend Paxton. By December 1900, the town was constructing a Baptist church.

In 1908, the Wagoner Weekly Savings reported that neighboring community Coweta claimed the community.

The town had a newspaper, the Clarksville Echo.

== Demographics ==
=== 2020 census ===
As of the 2020 census, Clarksville had a population of 17. The median age was 32.8 years. 11.8% of residents were under the age of 18 and 17.6% of residents were 65 years of age or older. For every 100 females there were 88.9 males, and for every 100 females age 18 and over there were 87.5 males age 18 and over.

0.0% of residents lived in urban areas, while 100.0% lived in rural areas.

There were 6 households in Clarksville, of which 16.7% had children under the age of 18 living in them. Of all households, 83.3% were married-couple households, 0.0% were households with a male householder and no spouse or partner present, and 16.7% were households with a female householder and no spouse or partner present. About 0.0% of all households were made up of individuals and 0.0% had someone living alone who was 65 years of age or older.

There were 11 housing units, of which 45.5% were vacant. The homeowner vacancy rate was 0.0% and the rental vacancy rate was 0.0%.

Racial composition as of the 2020 census
Race	Number	Percent
White	12	70.6%
Black or African American	0	0.0%
American Indian and Alaska Native	0	0.0%
Asian	0	0.0%
Native Hawaiian and Other Pacific Islander	0	0.0%
Some other race	0	0.0%
Two or more races	5	29.4%
Hispanic or Latino (of any race)	1	5.9%

=== Historical population ===
A 1900 news report on the founding of the town indicated that the population was less than 200. The 1907 special census of Oklahoma Territory reported that Clarksville had a population of 334.
