= Neodesha, Oklahoma =

Unincorporated community in Oklahoma, US

Coordinates: 36°02′45″N 95°26′03″W

Neodesha is an unincorporated community in Wagoner County, Oklahoma, United States. It was founded by C. R. White, a former resident of Neodesha, Kansas. The name is derived from the Osage Indian word, Ni-o-sho-de, and is translated as The-Water-Is-Smoky-With-Mud.

== Geography ==
Neodesha is south of Chouteau and north of Wagoner off U.S. Route 69, located west on Hall Ranch Road. Neodesha is located at latitude 36.046 and longitude -95.434. Its elevation is 610 feet.
