= Gibson, Oklahoma =

Unincorporated community in Oklahoma, US

Coordinates: 35°52′15″N 95°21′07″W

Gibson is an unincorporated community in Wagoner County, Oklahoma, United States. It is located on Oklahoma State Highway 16, approximately six miles south of Wagoner and 2 1/2 miles northwest of Okay. The Gibson Station was the first passenger and freight station built in Indian Territory, now Oklahoma, constructed in 1872 by the Missouri–Kansas–Texas Railroad.
