= New Tulsa, Oklahoma =

New Tulsa, Oklahoma Tvl-Mocvse (Creek)
- Defunct Town
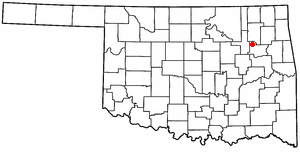
- Location of New Tulsa, Oklahoma
- Coordinates: 36°06′00″N 95°44′21″W
- Country: United States
- State: Oklahoma
- County: Wagoner
- Established: 1968

Area
  - Total: 0.85 sq mi (2.2 km^{2})
  - Land: 0.85 sq mi (2.2 km^{2})
  - Water: 0 sq mi (0.0 km^{2})
- Elevation: 686 ft (209 m)

Population (2000)
  - Total: 568
  - Density: 675/sq mi (260.6/km^{2})
- Time zone: UTC-6 (Central (CST))
  - Summer (DST): UTC-5 (CDT)
- ZIP code: 74429
- Area codes: 539/918
- FIPS code: 40-51650
- GNIS feature ID: 1102754

New Tulsa (Creek: Tvl-Mocvse) was a town in Wagoner County, Oklahoma, United States. The population was 568 at the 2000 census. The town was dissolved in 2001 by a vote of the residents and is now part of the city of Broken Arrow.

== History ==
New Tulsa was a community in Wagoner County that originally incorporated as the town of Oak Grove, but renamed itself in 1968. Its population was 17 in 1980. The general store that served the community closed in 1975. The population grew to 252 in 1980 and to 272 in 1990.

== Geography ==
New Tulsa was located at 36°06′00″N 95°44′21″W (36.099869, -95.739074).

According to the United States Census Bureau, the town had a total area of 0.9 square miles (2.3 km^{2}), all of it land.

== Demographics ==
As of the census of 2000, there were 568 people, 192 households, and 161 families residing in the town. The population density was 675.0 inhabitants per square mile (260.6/km^{2}). There were 198 housing units at an average density of 235.3 per square mile (90.8/km^{2}). The racial makeup of the town was 78.17% White, 6.34% African American, 7.39% Native American, 1.76% Asian, 0.70% from other races, and 5.63% from two or more races. Hispanic or Latino of any race were 2.99% of the population.

There were 192 households, out of which 42.2% had children under the age of 18 living with them, 62.0% were married couples living together, 14.1% had a female householder with no husband present, and 16.1% were non-families. 14.6% of all households were made up of individuals, and 1.0% had someone living alone who was 65 years of age or older. The average household size was 2.96 and the average family size was 3.19.

In the town the population was spread out, with 32.9% under the age of 18, 7.2% from 18 to 24, 29.6% from 25 to 44, 23.9% from 45 to 64, and 6.3% who were 65 years of age or older. The median age was 34 years. For every 100 females, there were 106.5 males. For every 100 females age 18 and over, there were 98.4 males.

The median income for a household in the town was $35,625, and the median income for a family was $33,750. Males had a median income of $31,667 versus $26,071 for females. The per capita income for the town was $13,438. About 11.2% of families and 12.6% of the population were below the poverty line, including 19.8% of those under age 18 and 5.9% of those age 65 or over.

== Education ==
The area school district is Broken Arrow Public Schools.
