= St. James Episcopal Church (Wagoner, Oklahoma) =

Historic church in Oklahoma, United States

- U.S. National Register of Historic Places
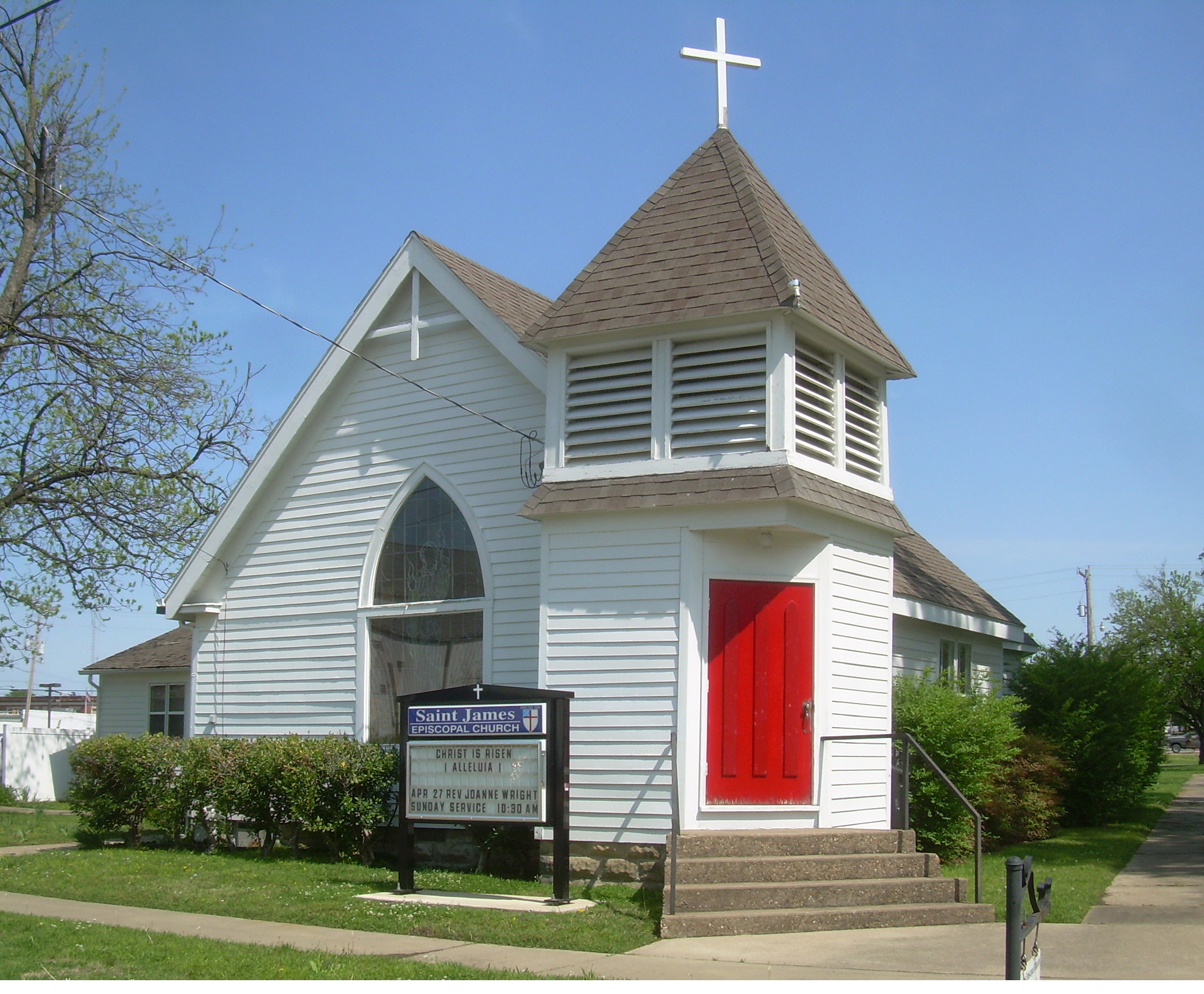
- Location: Wagoner, Oklahoma
- Coordinates: 35°57′30″N 95°22′25″W
- Built: 1894
- NRHP reference No.: 82003714
- Added to NRHP: 5-11-1982

St. James Episcopal Church, built in 1894, is an Episcopal church in Wagoner, Oklahoma. The congregation is part of the Episcopal Diocese of Oklahoma.

In 2015, the church reported 39 members; in 2023, it reported 42 members. No membership statistics were reported in 2024 national parochial reports. Plate and pledge financial support reported by the church in 2024 was $17,680. Average Sunday Attendance (ASA) reported in 2024 was 21 persons. This was a relative increase from ASA of 26 reported in 2015.

== Building and history ==
The building was added to the National Register of Historic Places on May 11, 1982.
