= Collin McKinney House =

Historic house in Oklahoma, United States

- U.S. National Register of Historic Places
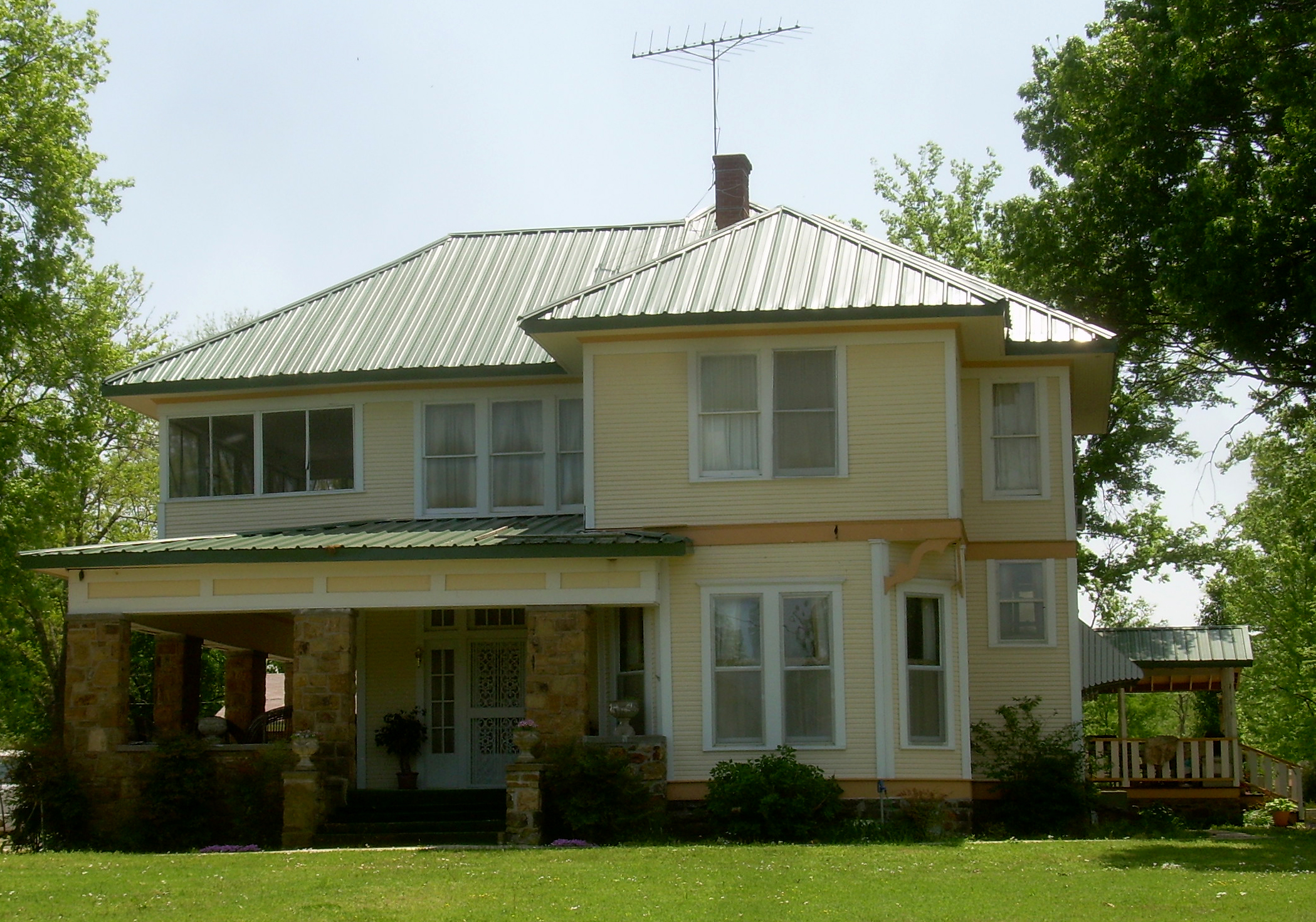

- Location within Oklahoma Location within the United States
- Location: 1106 SE 7th Street, Wagoner, Oklahoma
- Coordinates: 35°57′5″N 95°21′44″W
- Built: 1900
- Architect: Multiple
- MPS: Territorial Homes of Wagoner, Oklahoma TR
- NRHP reference No.: 82003708
- Added to NRHP: July 6, 1982

The Collin McKinney House is a historic house located at 1106 SE 7th Street in Wagoner, Oklahoma, United States. The house is a two-story, rectangular structure built in 1900. It was constructed of clapboard with a sandstone foundation, has a hipped roof, and is 45 by 55 feet (14 m × 17 m) in plan.

It was added to the National Register of Historic Places in 1982.
