= Rio Grande Ranch Headquarters Historic District =

Historic house in Oklahoma, United States

- U.S. National Register of Historic Places
- U.S. Historic district
- Location within Oklahoma Location within the United States
- Nearest city: Okay, Oklahoma
- Coordinates: 35°50′58″N 95°15′26″W
- Built: 1909
- Architectural style: Prairie School
- NRHP reference No.: 92001191
- Added to NRHP: September 9, 1992

The Rio Grande Ranch Headquarters Historic District (also known as Three Forks Ranch) is a historic one-story residence located 3 miles (4.8 km) east of Okay in Wagoner County, Oklahoma. The site was listed on the National Register of Historic Places September 9, 1992. The site's Period of Significance is 1910 to 1935, and it qualified for listing under NRHP criteria A and C.

The historic district consists of 40 acres of ranch land with 15 resources, 13 rated as "Contributing" and 2 as noncontributing.

The ranch house was built in the Prairie School architectural style out of sandstone which was mined at a local quarry. The complete site consists of the original residence, a smoke house and the spring house.

== History ==
An Act of Congress in May, 1908, allowed the sale of Cherokee lands to non-Cherokees. Previously, non-Cherokees were only allowed to lease such land. In August, 1908, Dr. Charles E. Daily bought 50 acres (0.20 km^{2}) in the newly created Wagoner County, Oklahoma. The land would become the headquarters of the Rio Grande Ranch. Daily continued to buy land, and owned 285 acres (1.15 km^{2}) by the end of the year. In 1910, Dr. Daily bought enough shorthorn cattle from his father's ranch in Indiana to establish his own herd. The herd proved successful in its new home. However, the elder Daily died in 1915, and his son felt he needed to sell his Oklahoma ranch and return to Indiana.

Frank A. Gillespie, a Tulsa oilman, bought the ranch in November, 1915. Born in Oil City, Pennsylvania, he had come to Tulsa in 1904, where he was said to be highly successful. His hobby was raising purebred shorthorn cattle. He already owned several other large ranches in the state. Gillespie immediately began the Rio Grande's land holdings and its herd. In 1916, he built a 16,000 square feet (1,500 m^{2}) concrete barn as a place to show his cattle. In 1917 he bought an unspecified amount of Grand River bottom land to add to the ranch. Gillespie sold the ranch to Clinton R. Strong on February 11, 1918.

Although Strong continued to raise shorthorns, he apparently did nothing else to improve the ranch. One year after buying it, he traded it for ownership of some railroad stock. (Note: The NRHP registration did not identify the name of the railroad or the value of the transaction.) By 1920, the ranch was owned by James W. Maney, an Oklahoma City railroad contractor. Money's son, Robert, actually moved into the Rock House in 1920-1921 and managed the ranch with the help of three ranch hands. James actually started a couple of sidelines for the property: a producing oil well and a gravel production business on the Grand River. But it was still cattle raising that brought in the big profits. In 1920, the ranch held a sale of registered shorthorns in Tulsa and grossed an average of $395 per head, which was considered a good price at the time.

James Maney sold the ranch to Yeoman Life Insurance Company in 1935, ending the ranch's significance as a source of purebred shorthorn cattle.

== Description of buildings ==
=== "Rock Manor" Ranch house ===
The 3,500 square feet (330 m^{2}), one-story main residence was one of the first structures built in 1909 - 1910. Its walls were covered with Atoka sandstone, which was quarried on the ranch. Hence, the house was always known as "Rock Manor" or "Rock House." The architecture is Prairie Style, and has the darker stone laid at the bottom of the elevation, becoming lighter as the exterior walls reach the roofline. (Note: Atoka sandstone varies in color, from dark at the surface to light brown at greater depths.) The hipped roof is low-pitched and covered with asphalt shingles, interrupted by two front-facing dormers. Each dormer has white clapboard walls and two windows, with three small glass panes over one larger pane. The wide eave overhang is enclosed with a wooden fascia and a tongue-in-groove wooden soffit. There are three brick chimneys penetrating through the roof. One chimney is on the center ridge and connects to the living room fireplace. The other two are on the roof slopes, serving four wood stoves (kitchen, dining room and two bedrooms).

A porch spans the front facade (south elevation) and wraps around about one-third of the elevation. It is raised with a concrete floor and steps. The steps are flanked by short sandstone wing walls that are capped with concrete and decorated with concrete horse heads. Slightly tapered sandstone columns with concrete capitals support the porch roof, whose ceiling is made of tongue-in-groove wood painted white. Four-inch diameter metal pipes connecting the columns, serve as the porch rail.

The double-hung windows are made of wood and are of different sizes. The NRHP application said that they were probably made on-site to fit specific window openings, which were not all of uniform size. The main entrance door is oversized and has a single pane of glass, with an overhead transom. Other exterior doors are wooden, paneled type, single doors with a transom. The transoms were adjustable to facilitate natural cooling during the summer.

Inside the house, the most notable feature is a large rock fireplace in the living room, faced with quarried sandstone and having a simple wooden mantle. The concrete floor in the living room probably prevented serious damage to the house whenever sparks may have flown out of the fireplace. All other rooms in the house have wood floors. Ceilings in all the rooms are 12 feet (3.7 m) high, and most rooms are decorated with picture molding. All interior doors have transoms (again to promote air circulation), and have solid brass hardware. There are two wooden built-in cabinets: a gun cabinet in the sitting room and a china cabinet in the dining room. Ceilings and interior walls are covered with plaster over wood lath. The inside of exterior walls was covered directly with plaster.

=== Secondary buildings ===
Three secondary buildings share the 1.1 acres (4,500 m^{2}) yard of the Rock House: the spring house and the root cellar are southwest of the main house, and the smokehouse is northeast. A rock wall encloses the yard. The three secondary buildings each have Atoka sandstone walls, 2 feet (0.61 m) thick, and sloped concrete roofs, 4 inches (10 cm) thick.

- The smoke house is 13 feet (4.0 m) by 17 feet (5.2 m) and was built to store fresh meat, as well as to smoke meat and fish.
- The root cellar 14 feet (4.3 m) by 24 feet (7.3 m) was intended to store fruits and vegetables in a cool environment during the hot summer. It was also used as the storm cellar, when tornados were in the area.
- The spring cellar 14 feet (4.3 m) by 26 feet (7.9 m) provided drinking water from a cold spring, as well as providing a place to store perishables like eggs and milk.

== Other resources ==
=== Cistern-Well/Windmill ===
The original cistern-well was hand dug, rock-lined and provided all the water needed for household use, except for drinking water. Runoff from rain flowed into the cistern, supplemented by well water, which the windmill pumped into an overhead tank. The windmill also enough power to provide sufficient water pressure for the kitchen and baths. The overhead tank no longer exists, but the cistern-well now irrigation supplies water for the yard and the surrounding land.

=== Septic system ===
A septic system was installed when the Rock House was originally built. it was still operating satisfactorily when the NRHP application was written.

=== Concrete barn ===
The concrete barn is a 14,000 square feet (1,300 m^{2}) rectangular structure with twin concrete silos at the north end. Stalls were originally made of metal pipe. The original overhead feeding system is intact. The roof is front-gabled and covered with brown, composition shingles. A hayloft is centered on the roof ridge and has a hipped roof with a cupola and open eaves. The barn has 26 double-hung, 6/6 windows. The original wood frame windows have been replaced with aluminum sashes, which have been painted to simulate the original appearance. Drive-in doors are on the north, east and west sides of the barn, while cattle doors are on the south side. There are shed roofs along the outside east and west walls, supported by square wooden posts. The sheds were to provide shade and shelter from the weather.
