= John W. Gibson House =

Historic house in Oklahoma, United States

- U.S. National Register of Historic Places
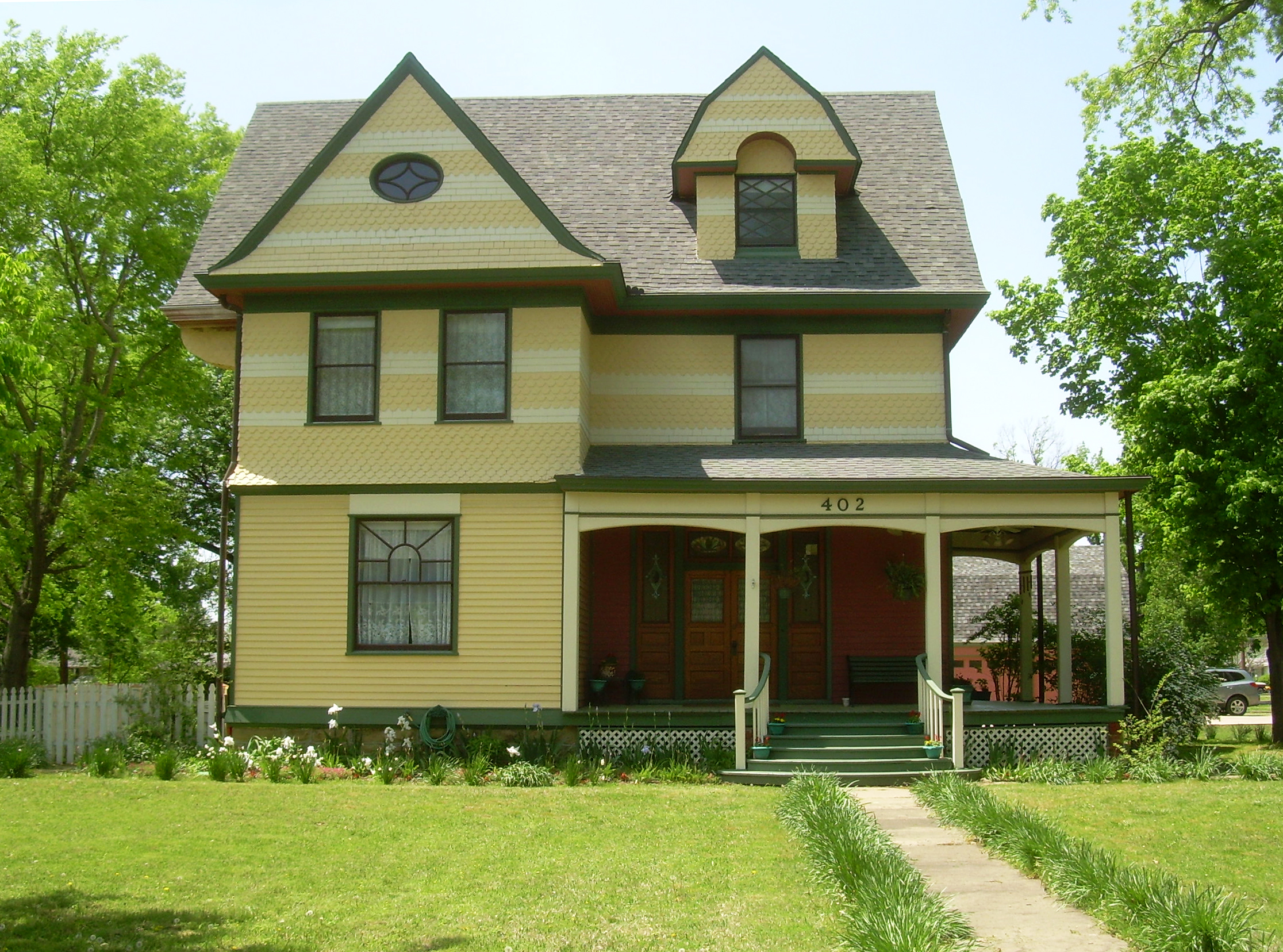

- Location within Oklahoma Location within the United States
- Location: 402 S McQuarrie Ave. Wagoner, Oklahoma, United States
- Coordinates: 35°57′22″N 95°22′1″W
- Built: 1896
- Architectural style: American Colonial
- NRHP reference No.: 82003710
- Added to NRHP: July 6, 1982

The John W. Gibson House, constructed in 1896, is a three-story Dutch Colonial Style Home owned and built by John Gibson, cattleman and banker. It was listed on the National Register of Historic Places in 1982. The house is one of the oldest pre-statehood houses in Wagoner. Gibson was president of the First National Bank in Wagoner for 26 years. The home features three stories plus a basement. From an opening in a third story bedroom floor, a brass fireman's pole serves as an emergency fire exit for the two bedrooms, loft and bath on the third story. The fireman's pole lands in the middle of the second story library nook. There is a wrap-around porch as well as a second porch off of the back entrance. The home was lovingly restored to historically accurate paint colors on the exterior during the early 2000s. Many of the interior fixtures have been updated, all in accordance with historical accuracy guidelines.
