= Frederick Parkinson House =

Historic house in Oklahoma, United States

- U.S. National Register of Historic Places
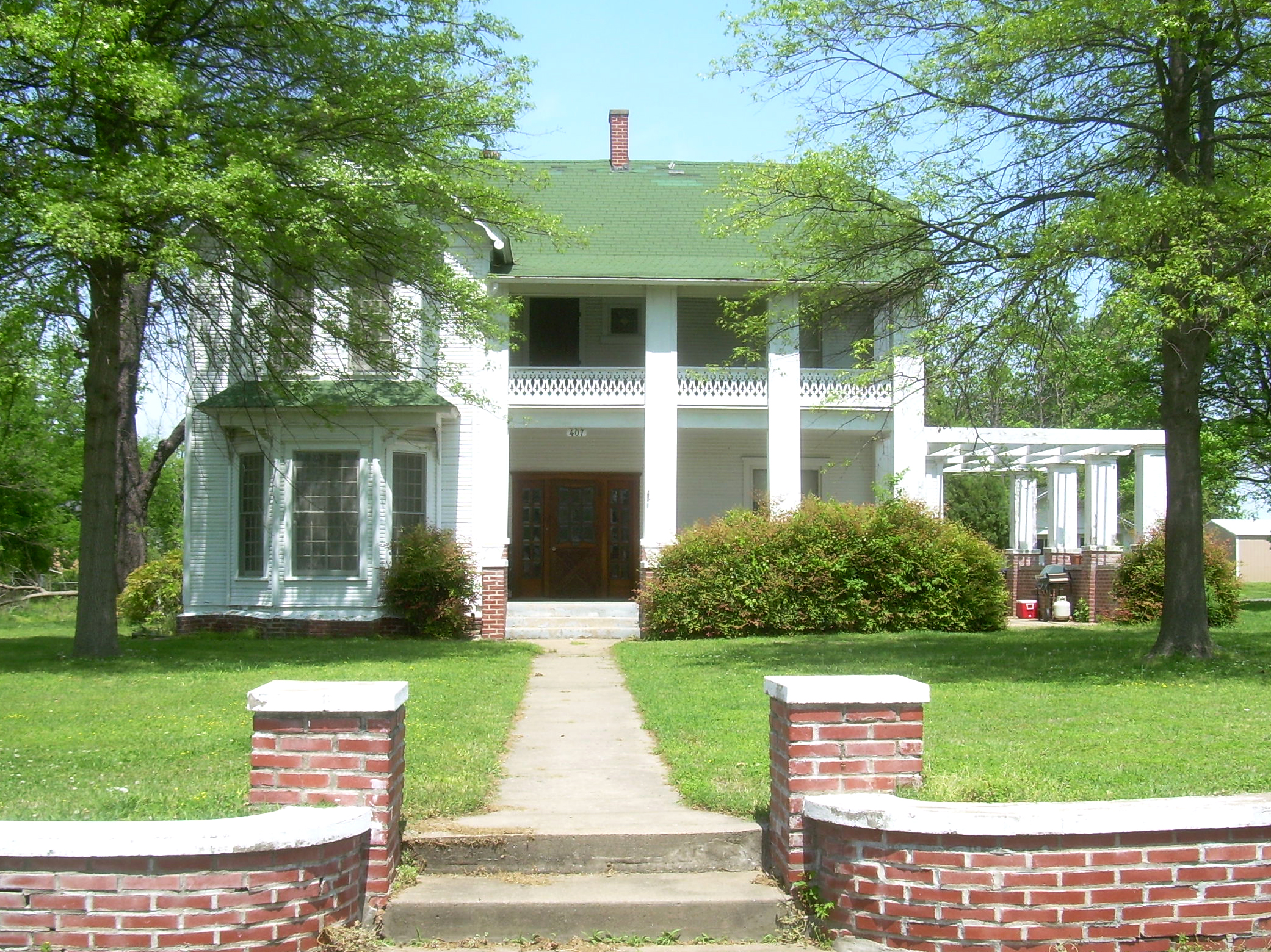

- Location within Oklahoma Location within the United States
- Location: Wagoner, Oklahoma
- Coordinates: 35°57′48″N 95°22′23″W
- Built: 1897
- NRHP reference No.: 82003713
- Added to NRHP: July 6, 1982

The Frederick Parkinson House is a historic house located in Wagoner, Oklahoma, United States. It was added to the National Register of Historic Places in 1982.

The house was built in 1897. It was home to Fred Parkinson, a prominent merchant in Wagoner.
