= Mallard Bay, Oklahoma =

Unincorporated community in Oklahoma, US

Coordinates: 35°51′35″N 95°16′45″W

Mallard Bay is an unincorporated community in Wagoner County, Oklahoma, United States. As of the 2020 census, Mallard Bay had a population of 280. The elevation is 607 feet. It is east-northeast of Okay, Oklahoma, and sits along the south end of Fort Gibson Lake just north of Oklahoma State Highway 251A. The public Mallard Bay Recreation Area is in the vicinity.

== Demographics ==
=== 2020 census ===
As of the 2020 census, Mallard Bay had a population of 280. The median age was 45.7 years. 21.8% of residents were under the age of 18 and 22.1% of residents were 65 years of age or older. For every 100 females there were 120.5 males, and for every 100 females age 18 and over there were 119.0 males age 18 and over.

0.0% of residents lived in urban areas, while 100.0% lived in rural areas.

There were 114 households in Mallard Bay, of which 21.1% had children under the age of 18 living in them. Of all households, 51.8% were married-couple households, 31.6% were households with a male householder and no spouse or partner present, and 12.3% were households with a female householder and no spouse or partner present. About 32.5% of all households were made up of individuals and 14.9% had someone living alone who was 65 years of age or older.

There were 148 housing units, of which 23.0% were vacant. The homeowner vacancy rate was 0.8% and the rental vacancy rate was 0.0%.

Racial composition as of the 2020 census
Race	Number	Percent
White	165	58.9%
Black or African American	0	0.0%
American Indian and Alaska Native	71	25.4%
Asian	5	1.8%
Native Hawaiian and Other Pacific Islander	0	0.0%
Some other race	2	0.7%
Two or more races	37	13.2%
Hispanic or Latino (of any race)	2	0.7%
