= Rocky Point, Oklahoma =

Unincorporated community in Oklahoma, US

Coordinates: 36°01′43″N 95°19′40″W

Rocky Point
- Unincorporated community
- Interactive map of Rocky Point
- Location within Oklahoma Rocky Point (the United States)
- Country: United States
- State: Oklahoma
- County: Wagoner County
- Time zone: UTC−6 (Central (CST))
  - Summer (DST): UTC−5 (CDT)
- GNIS feature ID: 1098948

Rocky Point is an unincorporated community in Wagoner County, Oklahoma, United States. As of the 2020 census, Rocky Point had a population of 946. It is situated on the upper end of Fort Gibson Lake, near the mouth of Flat Rock Creek, and includes the U.S. Army Corps of Engineers Rocky Point Campground, a year‑round public facility. The locality is recorded in the Geographic Names Information System (GNIS).

== Geography ==
Rocky Point lies on Flat Rock Bay where Flat Rock Creek meets the main channel of Fort Gibson Lake, with steep rocky bluffs on the park’s eastern edge and timbered areas to the west. The area is part of northeastern Oklahoma’s lake country and is one of several public use areas around Fort Gibson Lake managed by the United States Army Corps of Engineers.

== Demographics ==
=== 2020 census ===
As of the 2020 census, Rocky Point had a population of 946. The median age was 49.3 years. 19.9% of residents were under the age of 18 and 23.0% of residents were 65 years of age or older. For every 100 females there were 102.1 males, and for every 100 females age 18 and over there were 104.3 males age 18 and over.

0.0% of residents lived in urban areas, while 100.0% lived in rural areas.

There were 392 households in Rocky Point, of which 19.1% had children under the age of 18 living in them. Of all households, 47.2% were married-couple households, 25.0% were households with a male householder and no spouse or partner present, and 23.2% were households with a female householder and no spouse or partner present. About 31.1% of all households were made up of individuals and 13.8% had someone living alone who was 65 years of age or older.

There were 534 housing units, of which 26.6% were vacant. The homeowner vacancy rate was 3.1% and the rental vacancy rate was 17.6%.

Racial composition as of the 2020 census
Race	Number	Percent
White	654	69.1%
Black or African American	4	0.4%
American Indian and Alaska Native	134	14.2%
Asian	3	0.3%
Native Hawaiian and Other Pacific Islander	0	0.0%
Some other race	10	1.1%
Two or more races	141	14.9%
Hispanic or Latino (of any race)	31	3.3%

== History ==
The wider Wagoner County region shows evidence of prehistoric settlement, including sites attributed to the Caddoan Mound Builders (c. AD 300–1200) and the Norman Site near present‑day Taylor Ferry, which archaeologists describe as a sociopolitical center dating to c. AD 1200–1400. The modern landscape of the area was shaped in 1942 when the U.S. Army Corps of Engineers impounded the Grand (Neosho) River to create Fort Gibson Lake, which increased tourism and outdoor recreation around the reservoir. Nearby Fort Gibson was established in 1824 and later designated a National Historic Landmark; it remains open to the public.

== Parks and recreation ==
The United States Army Corps of Engineers operates Rocky Point Campground at the community, offering 62 campsites (including 59 with electric hookups and three non‑electric sites), a group day‑use shelter, a designated swim beach, three boat ramps and a courtesy dock, along with restrooms, showers, drinking water and dump stations. Fort Gibson Lake is known for boating, swimming and angling for black and white bass, crappie and catfish; thousands of acres of public land around the lake support seasonal hunting opportunities. The campground and community provide access to other nearby destinations around the lake, including Sequoyah State Park and Sequoyah Bay State Park.

== Government and services ==
Rocky Point is not incorporated as a municipality and is listed by Wagoner County among the county’s unincorporated communities.

== Transportation ==
Rocky Point is accessed from U.S. Route 69 north of Wagoner via East 690 Road and South 320 Road; the campground address is 68247 S. 320 Road, Wagoner, OK 74467. The state’s general highway map for Wagoner County shows Rocky Point in the lake area east of U.S. 69.

== See also ==
- Wagoner County, Oklahoma
- Fort Gibson Lake
- United States Army Corps of Engineers
