= Taylor Ferry, Oklahoma =

Unincorporated community in Oklahoma, US

Coordinates: 35°56′39″N 95°16′45″W

Taylor Ferry is an unincorporated community in Wagoner County, Oklahoma, United States, situated on Fort Gibson Lake. As of the 2020 census, Taylor Ferry had a population of 819. Taylor Ferry lies within the territory of the Cherokee Nation. The community was the site of a ferry crossing across the Grand River when Oklahoma was the Indian Territory during the 19th century.

== Demographics ==
=== 2020 census ===
As of the 2020 census, Taylor Ferry had a population of 819. The median age was 57.4 years. 13.4% of residents were under the age of 18 and 31.5% of residents were 65 years of age or older. For every 100 females there were 110.0 males, and for every 100 females age 18 and over there were 109.1 males age 18 and over.

0.0% of residents lived in urban areas, while 100.0% lived in rural areas.

There were 383 households in Taylor Ferry, of which 19.8% had children under the age of 18 living in them. Of all households, 52.2% were married-couple households, 21.1% were households with a male householder and no spouse or partner present, and 19.6% were households with a female householder and no spouse or partner present. About 25.3% of all households were made up of individuals and 15.7% had someone living alone who was 65 years of age or older.

There were 509 housing units, of which 24.8% were vacant. The homeowner vacancy rate was 2.1% and the rental vacancy rate was 1.7%.

Racial composition as of the 2020 census
Race	Number	Percent
White	596	72.8%
Black or African American	6	0.7%
American Indian and Alaska Native	109	13.3%
Asian	5	0.6%
Native Hawaiian and Other Pacific Islander	2	0.2%
Some other race	4	0.5%
Two or more races	97	11.8%
Hispanic or Latino (of any race)	10	1.2%
