= Toppers, Oklahoma =

Toppers
- Unincorporated community
- Toppers's location in Oklahoma Toppers (the United States)
- Coordinates: 35°58′14″N 95°18′35″W
- Country: United States
- State: Oklahoma
- County: Wagoner County

Area
  - Total: 3.31 sq mi (8.58 km^{2})
  - Land: 2.32 sq mi (6.00 km^{2})
  - Water: 1.00 sq mi (2.58 km^{2})
- Elevation: 607 ft (185 m)

Population (2020)
  - Total: 911
  - Density: 393.3/sq mi (151.85/km^{2})
- ZIP code: 74467
- GNIS feature ID: 1098948

Toppers is an unincorporated community in Wagoner County, Oklahoma, United States, situated on Fort Gibson Lake.

As of the 2020 census, Toppers had a population of 911.

== Demographics ==
Historical population
Census	Pop.	Note	%±
2020	911		—
U.S. Decennial Census

=== 2020 census ===
As of the 2020 census, Toppers had a population of 911. The median age was 46.3 years. 22.0% of residents were under the age of 18 and 22.8% of residents were 65 years of age or older. For every 100 females there were 95.5 males, and for every 100 females age 18 and over there were 97.0 males age 18 and over.

0.0% of residents lived in urban areas, while 100.0% lived in rural areas.

There were 387 households in Toppers, of which 27.9% had children under the age of 18 living in them. Of all households, 48.6% were married-couple households, 20.9% were households with a male householder and no spouse or partner present, and 21.7% were households with a female householder and no spouse or partner present. About 23.3% of all households were made up of individuals and 12.5% had someone living alone who was 65 years of age or older.

There were 456 housing units, of which 15.1% were vacant. The homeowner vacancy rate was 1.7% and the rental vacancy rate was 17.5%.

Racial composition as of the 2020 census
Race	Number	Percent
White	660	72.4%
Black or African American	10	1.1%
American Indian and Alaska Native	126	13.8%
Asian	5	0.5%
Native Hawaiian and Other Pacific Islander	0	0.0%
Some other race	0	0.0%
Two or more races	110	12.1%
Hispanic or Latino (of any race)	11	1.2%
