= Cobb Building (Wagoner, Oklahoma) =

- U.S. National Register of Historic Places
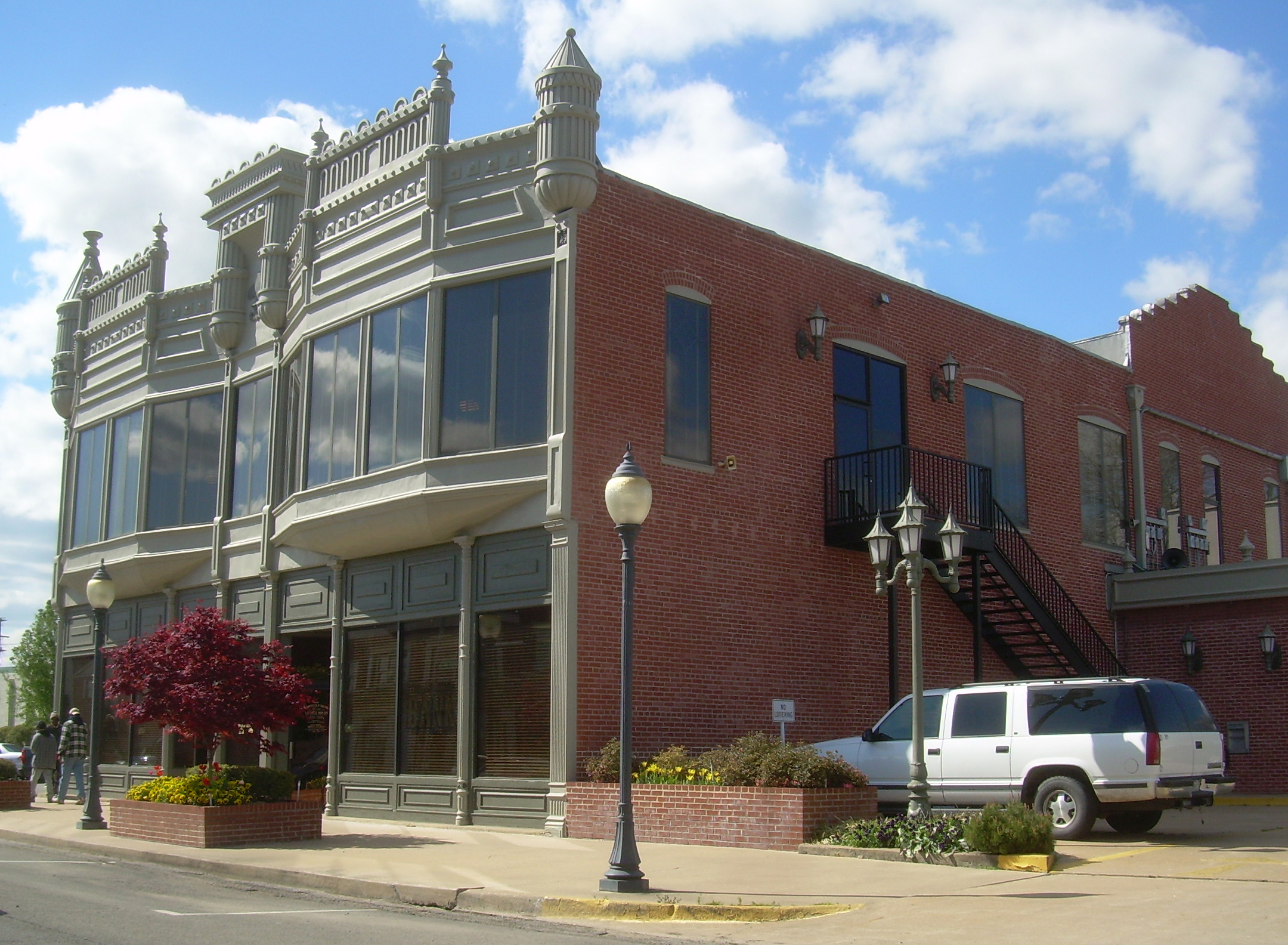
- Location: Wagoner, Oklahoma
- Coordinates: 35°57′36″N 95°22′36″W
- Architect: Samuel S. Cobb
- NRHP reference No.: 82003709
- Added to NRHP: August 13, 1982

The Cobb Building (also known as American Bank) is an American historic commercial building located at 203 East Cherokee Street in downtown Wagoner, Oklahoma.

== Description and history ==
The structure was completed in 1895, by Samuel S. Cobb to be used for his drug store. It is Wagoner's first brick business building; it was restored and now used by the American Bank.

The Cobb Building in 1895.

It was listed on the National Register of Historic Places on August 13, 1982.
