= Porter, Oklahoma =

- Town
- Motto: "Peach Capital of Oklahoma"
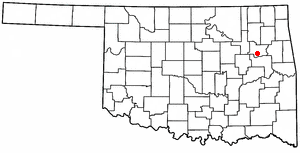
- Location of Porter, Oklahoma
- Coordinates: 35°52′3″N 95°31′19″W
- Country: United States
- State: Oklahoma
- County: Wagoner

Area
  - Total: 1.71 sq mi (4.43 km^{2})
  - Land: 1.71 sq mi (4.43 km^{2})
  - Water: 0 sq mi (0.00 km^{2})
- Elevation: 643 ft (196 m)

Population (2020)
  - Total: 561
  - Density: 328.0/sq mi (126.63/km^{2})
- Time zone: UTC-6 (Central (CST))
  - Summer (DST): UTC-5 (CDT)
- ZIP code: 74454
- Area codes: 539/918
- FIPS code: 40-60150
- GNIS feature ID: 1096842
- Website: townofporterok.org

Porter is a town in Wagoner County, Oklahoma, United States. It promotes itself as "The Peach Capital of Oklahoma." As of the 2020 census, Porter had a population of 561.

== Geography ==
Porter is located at 35°52′3″N 95°31′19″W (35.867448, -95.521818).

According to the United States Census Bureau, the town has a total area of 0.7 square miles (1.8 km^{2}), all land.

== Demographics ==
Historical population
Census	Pop.	Note	%±
1910	637		—
1920	597		−6.3%
1930	525		−12.1%
1940	562		7.0%
1950	562		0.0%
1960	492		−12.5%
1970	624		26.8%
1980	642		2.9%
1990	588		−8.4%
2000	574		−2.4%
2010	566		−1.4%
2020	561		−0.9%
U.S. Decennial Census

=== 2020 census ===
As of the 2020 census, Porter had a population of 561. The median age was 37.5 years. 25.7% of residents were under the age of 18 and 15.3% of residents were 65 years of age or older. For every 100 females there were 88.3 males, and for every 100 females age 18 and over there were 87.0 males age 18 and over.

0.0% of residents lived in urban areas, while 100.0% lived in rural areas.

There were 230 households in Porter, of which 31.3% had children under the age of 18 living in them. Of all households, 41.3% were married-couple households, 24.8% were households with a male householder and no spouse or partner present, and 25.2% were households with a female householder and no spouse or partner present. About 27.8% of all households were made up of individuals and 10.5% had someone living alone who was 65 years of age or older.

There were 267 housing units, of which 13.9% were vacant. The homeowner vacancy rate was 0.6% and the rental vacancy rate was 10.2%.

Racial composition as of the 2020 census
Race	Number	Percent
White	363	64.7%
Black or African American	30	5.3%
American Indian and Alaska Native	98	17.5%
Asian	2	0.4%
Native Hawaiian and Other Pacific Islander	0	0.0%
Some other race	8	1.4%
Two or more races	60	10.7%
Hispanic or Latino (of any race)	22	3.9%

=== 2000 census ===
As of the census of 2000, there were 574 people, 229 households, and 160 families residing in the town. The population density was 804.3 inhabitants per square mile (310.5/km^{2}). There were 253 housing units at an average density of 354.5 per square mile (136.9/km^{2}). The racial makeup of the town was 81.36% White, 3.83% African American, 9.58% Native American, 0.35% from other races, and 4.88% from two or more races. Hispanic or Latino of any race were 1.05% of the population.

There were 229 households, out of which 34.5% had children under the age of 18 living with them, 51.1% were married couples living together, 15.3% had a female householder with no husband present, and 30.1% were non-families. 28.4% of all households were made up of individuals, and 13.1% had someone living alone who was 65 years of age or older. The average household size was 2.51 and the average family size was 3.09.

In the town, the population was spread out, with 31.5% under the age of 18, 8.2% from 18 to 24, 25.6% from 25 to 44, 20.7% from 45 to 64, and 13.9% who were 65 years of age or older. The median age was 34 years. For every 100 females, there were 90.7 males. For every 100 females age 18 and over, there were 81.1 males.

The median income for a household in the town was $21,012, and the median income for a family was $23,875. Males had a median income of $23,750 versus $16,875 for females. The per capita income for the town was $10,718. About 16.1% of families and 19.7% of the population were below the poverty line, including 20.7% of those under age 18 and 38.0% of those age 65 or over.

== Education ==
Students are zoned to Porter Consolidated Schools.
