= Fort Gibson Dam =

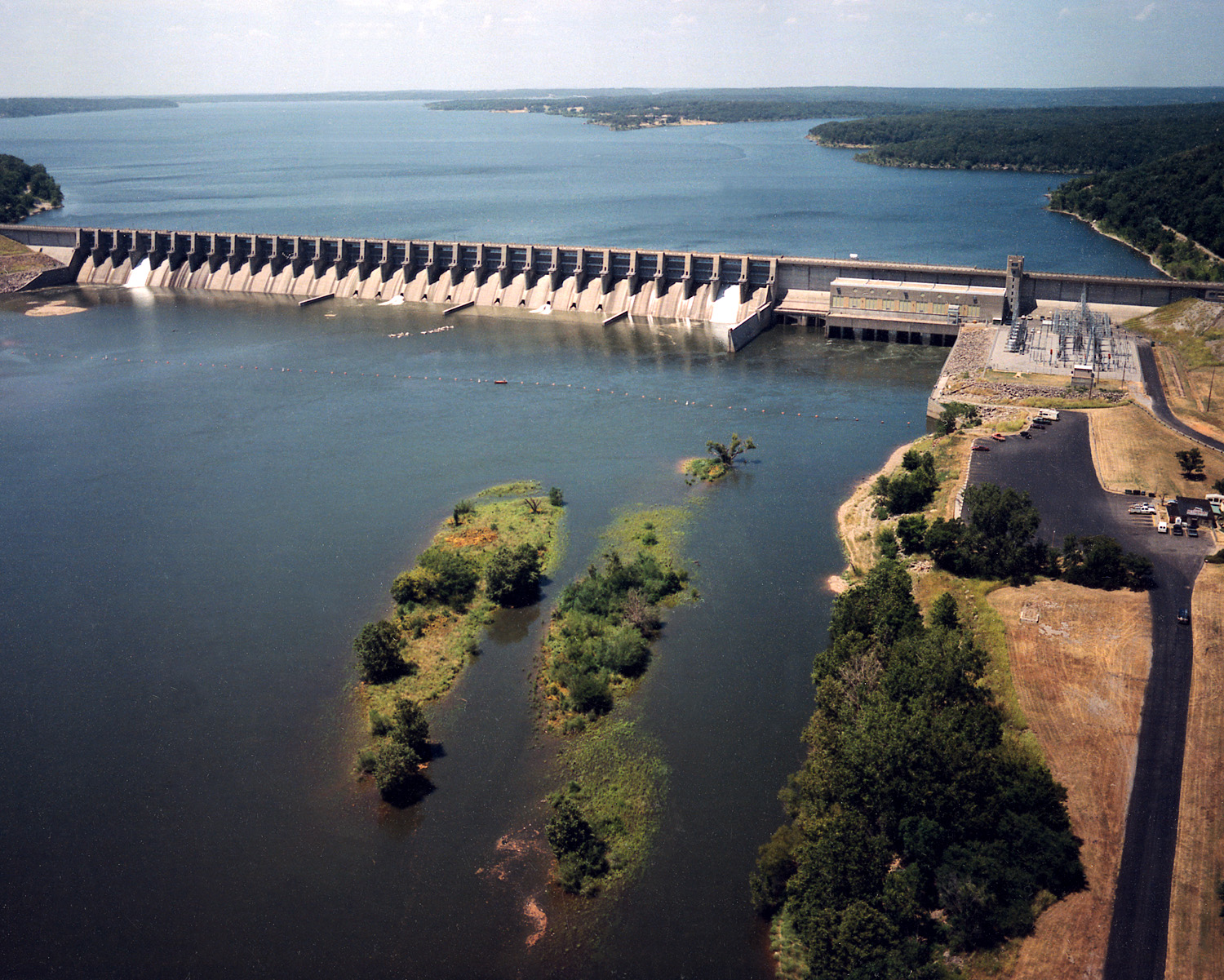
- Fort Gibson dam seen from above

- Location within Oklahoma
- Country: United States
- Location: Wagoner and Cherokee counties near Fort Gibson and Okay, Oklahoma, US
- Coordinates: 35°52′11″N 95°13′50″W
- Status: In Use
- Construction began: 1941
- Opening date: 1949
- Construction cost: $22,000,000
- Owner: U.S. Army Corps of Engineers

Dam and spillways
- Type of dam: Concrete Gravity
- Impounds: Neosho River
- Height: 110 ft (34 m)
- Length: 2,850 ft (869 m)
- Spillways: 30
- Spillway type: Tainter gate
- Spillway capacity: 986,000 ft^{3} (27,920 m^{3})

Reservoir
- Creates: Fort Gibson Lake
- Total capacity: 1,292,000 acre⋅ft (2 km^{3})
- Active capacity: 1,287,000 acre⋅ft (2 km^{3})
- Catchment area: 12,615 mi^{2} (32,673 km^{2})

Power Station
- Commission date: 1953
- Turbines: 4 x 11.25 MW Francis-type
- Installed capacity: 48 MW
- Annual generation: 208,482,000 KWh

The Fort Gibson Dam is a gravity dam on the Grand (Neosho) River in Oklahoma, 5.4 mi (9 km) north of the town of Fort Gibson. The dam forms Fort Gibson Lake. The primary purposes of the dam and lake are flood control and hydroelectric power production, although supply of drinking water to local communities, as well as recreation, are additional benefits. The project was authorized by the Flood Control Act of 1941 and construction began the next year. During World War II construction was suspended and it recommenced in May 1946. In June 1949, the river was closed and the entire project was complete in September 1953 with the operation of the last of the power plant's four generators. Rights to construct the project originally belonged to the Grand River Dam Authority, but were seized by the U.S. Army Corps of Engineers in 1946.

== Salient features ==
Release of floodwater in 2015

=== Dam ===
Dam
Type	Concrete gravity
Average Height	90 ft (27 m)
Crest length	2,850 ft (869 m)
Concrete	461,300 yd^{3} (352,689 m^{3})
Reinforcing steel	2,655,000 lb (1,204,288 kg)
Miscellaneous metal works and castings	300,000 lb (136,078 kg)
Tainter gates	3,120,000 lb (1,415,208 kg)
Tainter gate anchorages	901,000 lb (408,687 kg)
Emergency gate guides	160,000 lb (72,575 kg)

Dikes
Number	3
Type	Rolled earth filled topped by surfaced service roadway
Height	18 ft (5 m) (max)
Length (Total all dikes)	8,500 ft (2,591 m)
Width (At top)	16 ft (5 m)

Elevations (above sea level)
Top of dam	593 ft (181 m)
Top of gates	582 ft (177 m)
Spillway crest	547 ft (167 m)
Top of power pool	554 ft (169 m)
Flood control pool	582 ft (177 m)

=== Spillway ===
Spillway
Type	Gate-controlled concrete gravity ogee-weir with stilling basin
Gates	30 (40 feet by 35 feet tainter)
Length	1,490 ft (454 m)
Capacity - Pool at top of gates	915,000 cu ft/s (25,910 m^{3}/s)
Capacity - Maximum pool	915,000 cu ft/s (25,910 m^{3}/s)
Capacity - Power pool	69,000 cu ft/s (1,954 m^{3}/s)

=== Outlet works ===
Outlet works
Number of sluices	10
Size of sluices	5 feet 8 inches by 7 feet
Capacity - Pool at top of gates	20,800 cu ft/s (589 m^{3}/s)
Capacity - Power pool	16,500 cu ft/s (467 m^{3}/s)
Capacity - Pool at WEIR crest	15,300 cu ft/s (433 m^{3}/s)

=== Reservoir ===
Reservoir Capacities
Pool - at top of gates	1,287,000 acre-feet (1.587×10^{9} m^{3})
Pool- at maximum stage	1,292,000 acre-feet (1.594×10^{9} m^{3})
Top of power pool	365,000 acre-feet (450,000,000 m^{3})
Drainage area	12,615 mi^{2} (32,673 km^{2})

== Contractors ==
First Contract: Al Johnson construction co. Winston brothers co. peter kiewit sons co. 608 Foshay Tower. Minneapolis, Minnesota

Second Contract: W. R. Grimshaw company. - Tulsa, Oklahoma
