= Wagoner, Oklahoma =

- City
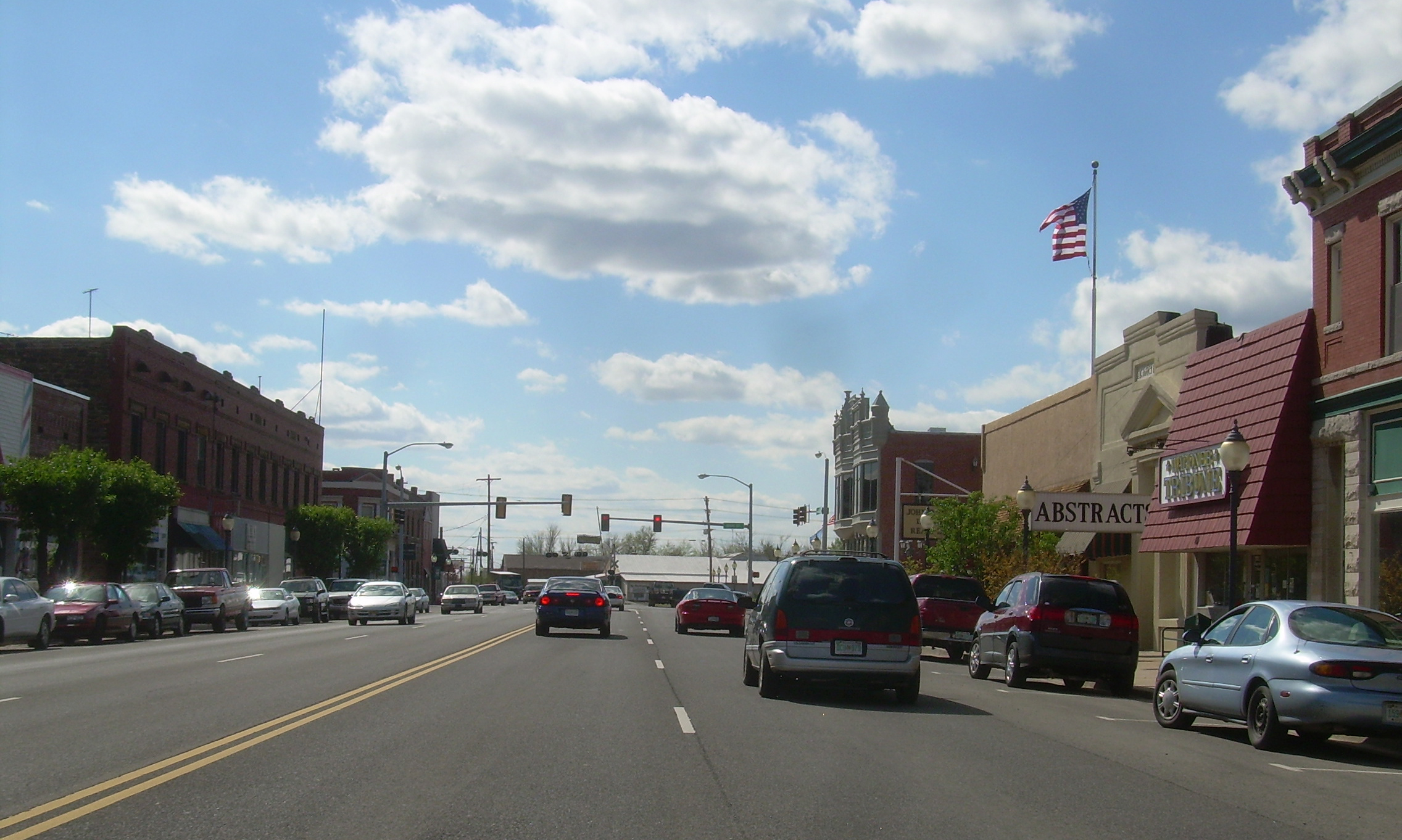
- Downtown Wagoner
- Motto: " Proud Of Our Past Confident In Our Future "
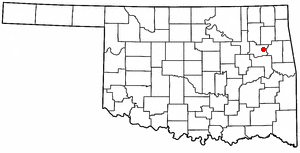
- Location of Wagoner, Oklahoma
- Coordinates: 35°57′35″N 95°22′41″W
- Country: United States
- State: Oklahoma
- County: Wagoner

Government
  - Mayor: Dalton Self

Area
  - Total: 10.02 sq mi (25.94 km^{2})
  - Land: 10.01 sq mi (25.93 km^{2})
  - Water: 0.0039 sq mi (0.01 km^{2})
- Elevation: 587 ft (179 m)

Population (2020)
  - Total: 7,621
  - Density: 761.2/sq mi (293.9/km^{2})
- Time zone: UTC-6 (Central (CST))
  - Summer (DST): UTC-5 (CDT)
- ZIP codes: 74467, 74477
- Area codes: 539/918
- Website: wagonerok.org

Wagoner is a city in Wagoner County, Oklahoma, United States. As of the 2020 census, Wagoner had a population of 7,621. It is the county seat of Wagoner County. Wagoner became the first city incorporated in Indian Territory on January 4, 1896.

== History ==
Historical population
| Census | Pop. | Note | %± |
|---|---|---|---|
| 1900 | 2,372 | | — |
| 1910 | 4,018 | | 69.4% |
| 1920 | 3,436 | | −14.5% |
| 1930 | 2,994 | | −12.9% |
| 1940 | 3,535 | | 18.1% |
| 1950 | 4,395 | | 24.3% |
| 1960 | 4,469 | | 1.7% |
| 1970 | 4,959 | | 11.0% |
| 1980 | 6,191 | | 24.8% |
| 1990 | 6,894 | | 11.4% |
| 2000 | 7,669 | | 11.2% |
| 2010 | 8,323 | | 8.5% |
| 2020 | 7,621 | | −8.4% |

Wagoner is along the path of the Texas Road cattle trail, and the later Jefferson Highway of the early National Trail System, both roughly along the route of U.S. Route 69 through Oklahoma today. The town began as a small community at the intersection of the Missouri-Kansas-Texas (MKT) Railway and the Kansas and Arkansas Valley Railway (later the Missouri Pacific Railway), when William McAnally, a foreman for the MKT built a small hotel at this isolated location in June 1887. By the next summer others had built two more hotels and two general stores. The town was named for railroad dispatcher Henry "Big Foot" Wagoner, who had reported the need for a railroad switch nearby to accommodate the shipment of logs and hay. The switch had been previously named "Wagoner's Switch." The switch soon relocated to the town and caused the development of a major cattle shipping business.

By 1894, the community had 642 names in a local census. A local newspaper began promoting the town in 1895, encouraging more people to move to there. By 1896, there were approximately 1,500 residents. In the fall of 1895, the community formed a commission that circulated a petition requesting incorporation under the statutes of Arkansas. Incorporation was granted by the U. S. District Court on January 4, 1896, making Wagoner the first city incorporated in Indian Territory.

A privately funded courthouse was built in 1897, which housed a newly created U. S. Western District Court. The Dawes Commission turned Indian Territory land from tribal to individual ownership by members of each tribe. The individuals were allowed to sell their land to non-Indians, causing a real estate boom in farmland around the area. By statehood, the city had 2,950 residents and was named as the county seat of Wagoner County.

In April 1914 Wagoner was the location of a brutal lynching of a 17 year old African American girl.

The boom continued through 1910, when the population reached 4,018. The MKT had located a division headquarters in the city, which then had three railroad trunk lines and twenty passenger trains a day. Industries included three grain elevators, a cotton gin, cotton oil mill, iron foundry, hardwood company, cement plant, and roller mill. However, the boom ended in 1913, when the MKT moved its division headquarters to Muskogee. The oil boom farther west and later, the Great Depression, caused a further decline in the city's economy and population.

World War II started a revival of Wagoner's fortunes. The city lay between two war-related Federal Government projects: Camp Gruber to the south and the Oklahoma Ordnance Works to the north.

After the war, several small manufacturing industries took root. Completion of the nearby Fort Gibson Lake in 1950 stimulated the economy and turned Wagoner into a sports and retirement center. The McLellan-Kerr navigational channel made the agricultural area accessible by barges, stimulating farm-related businesses. Highway improvements created Wagoner as a suburban area for Tulsa and Muskogee.

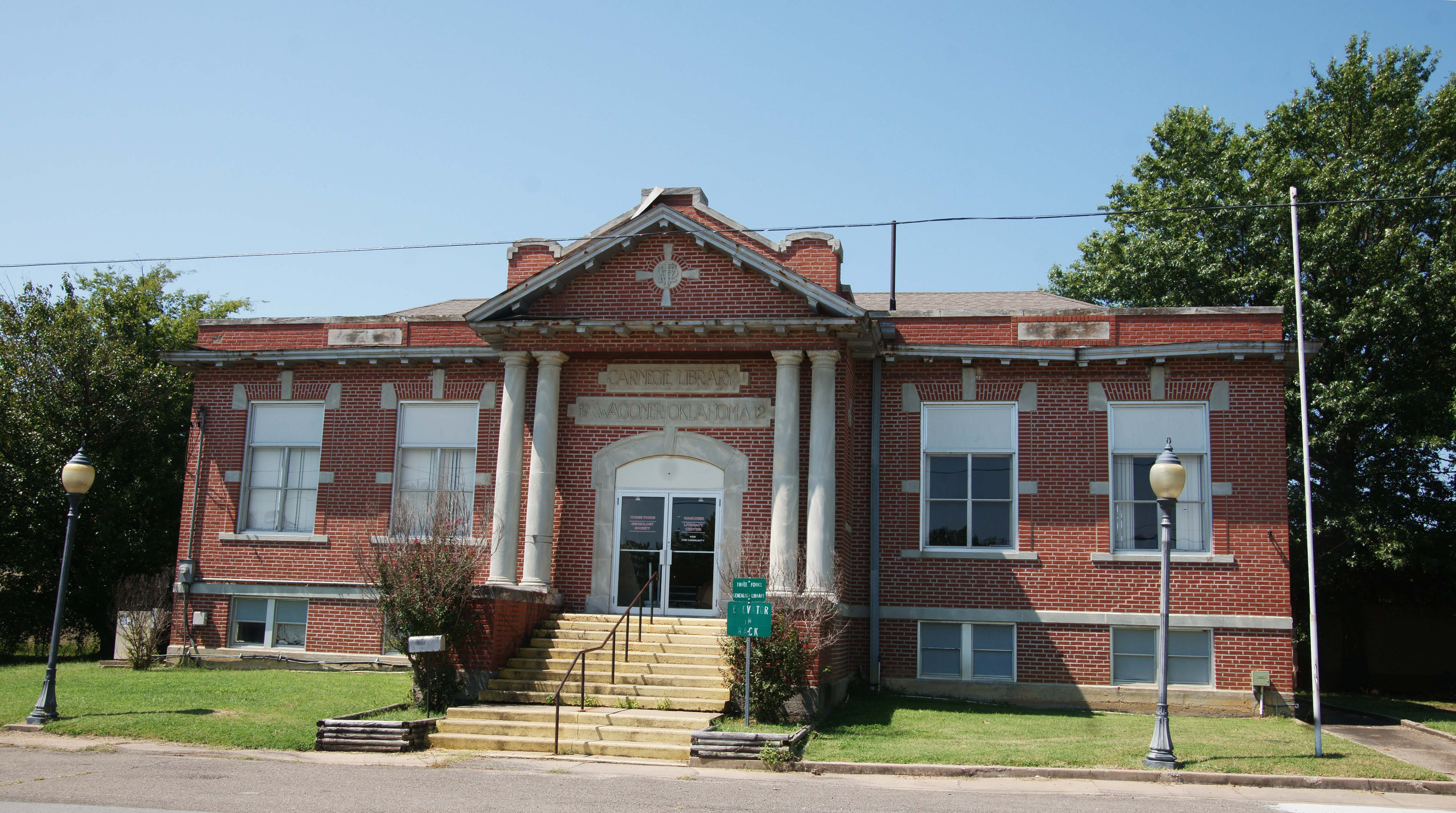
Wagoner, Oklahoma Carnegie Library built in 1912

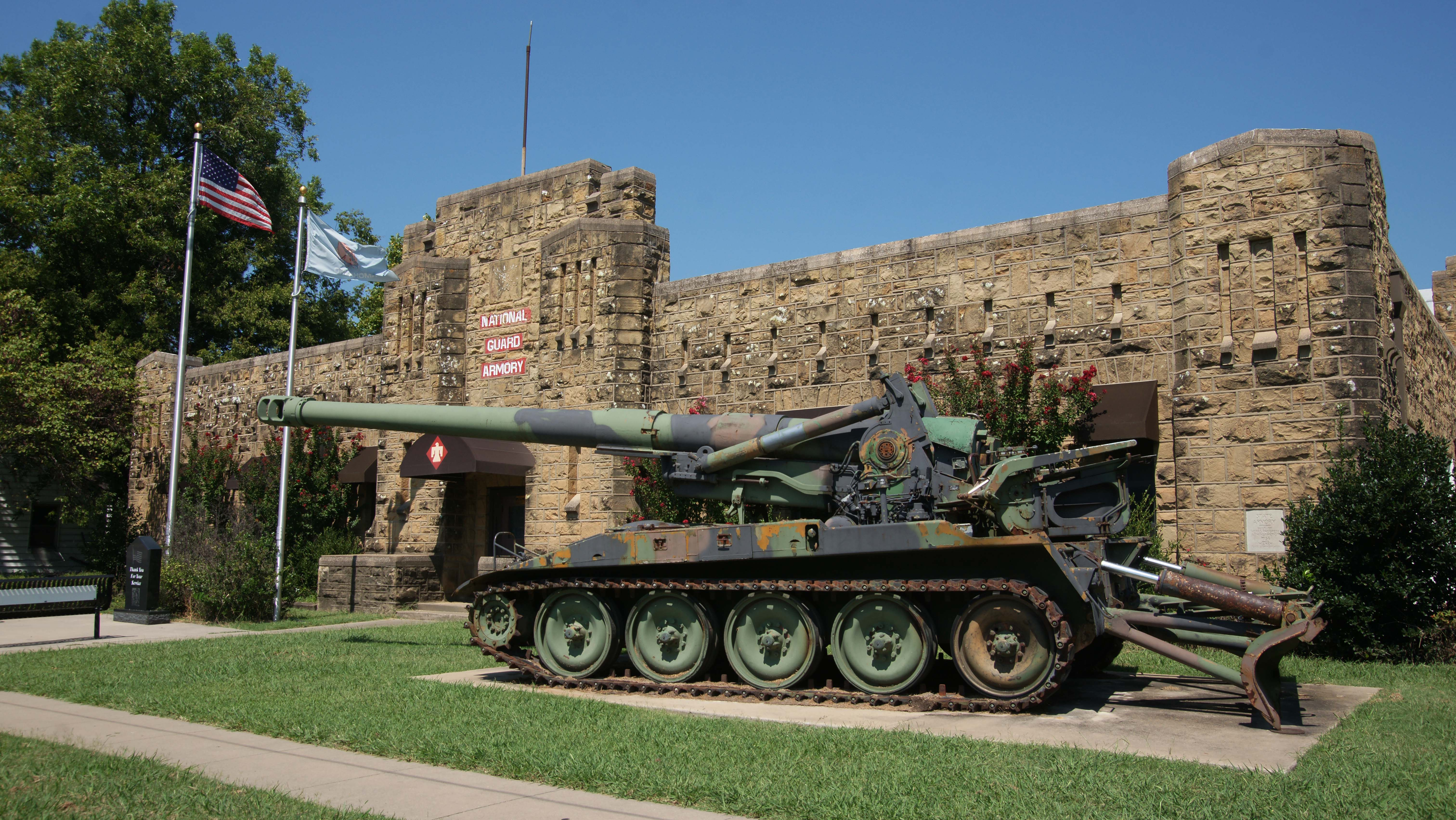
Wagoner, Oklahoma National Guard Armory built in 1938

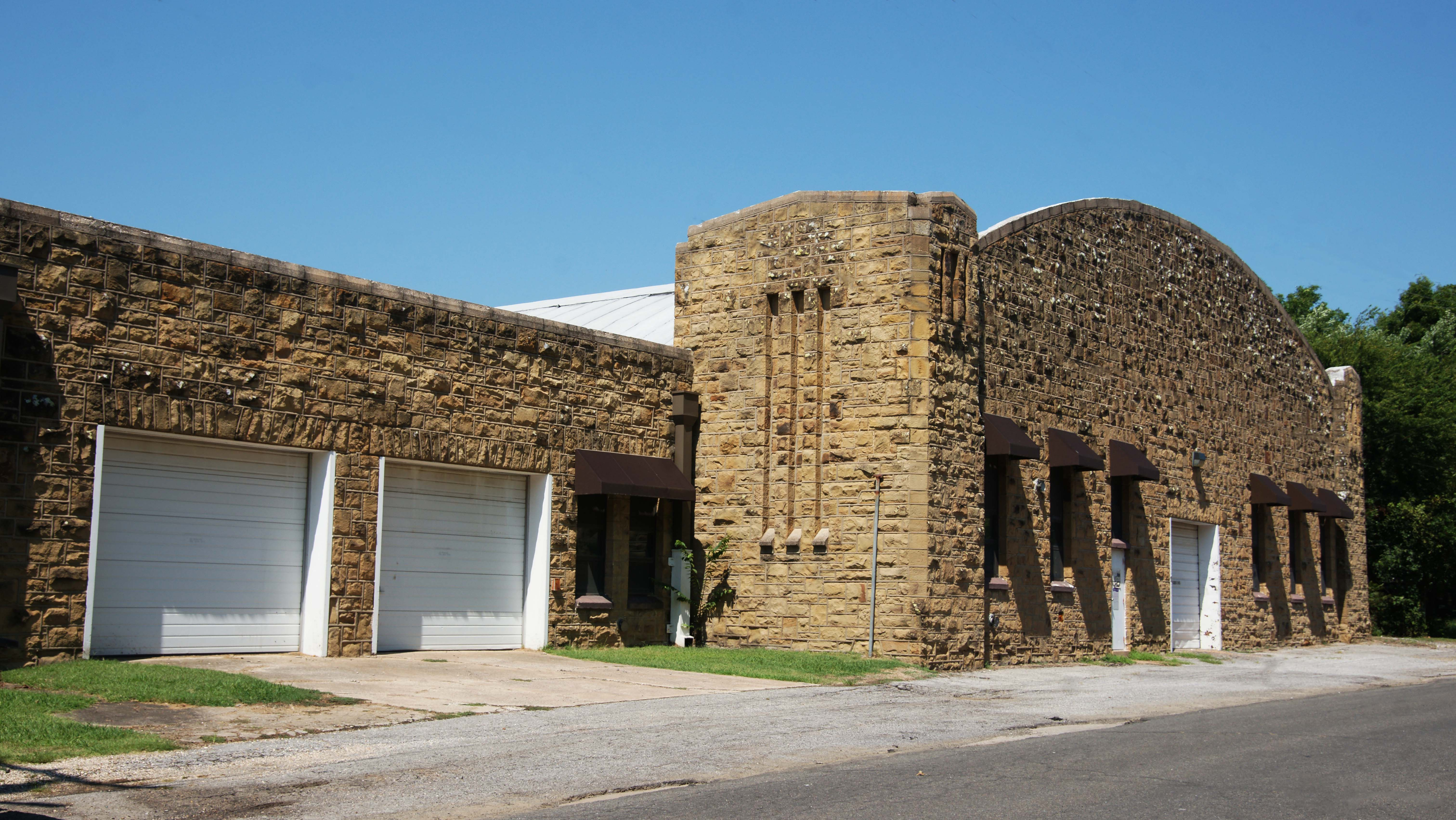
Wagoner, Oklahoma National Guard Armory built in 1938

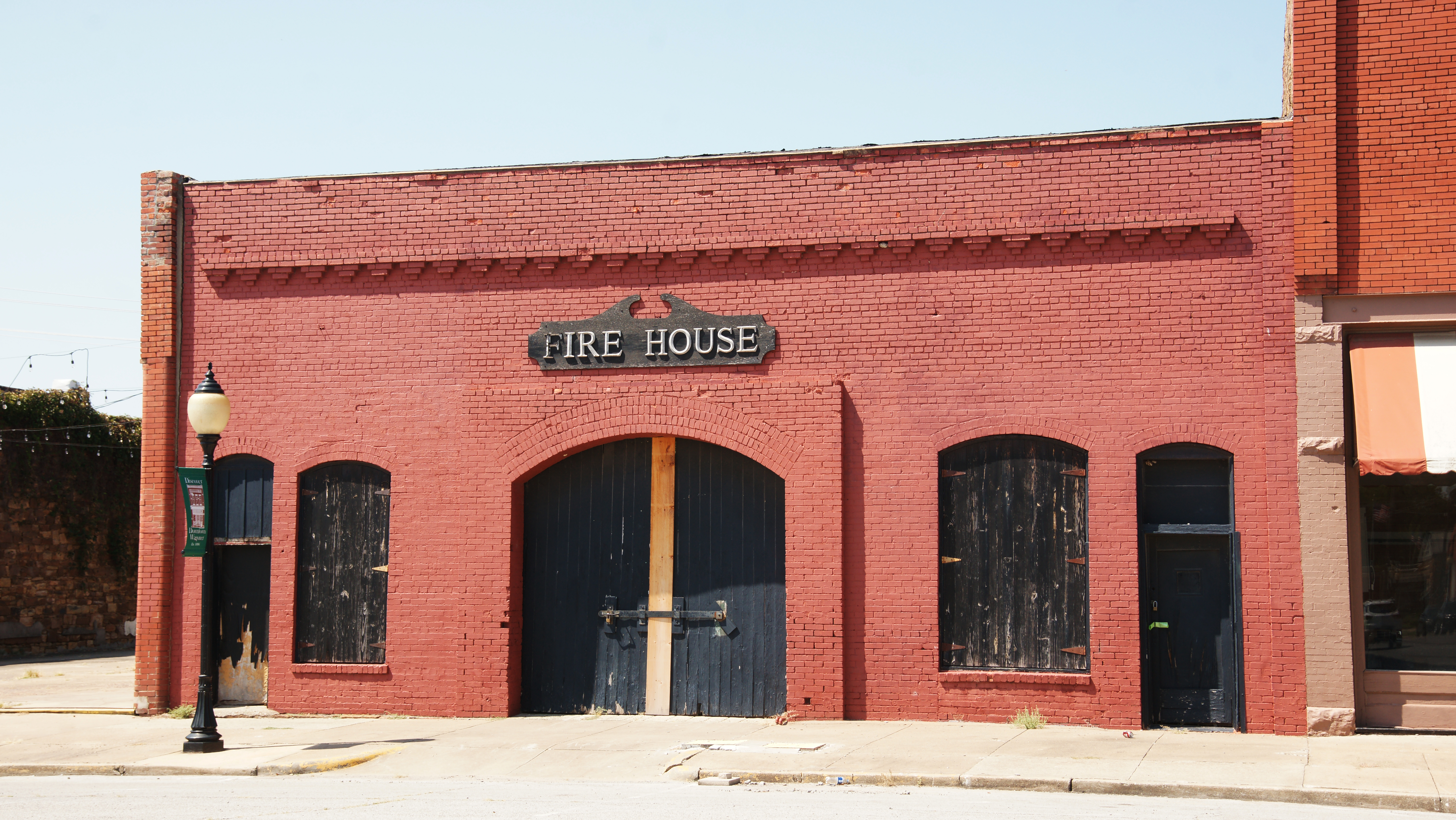
The Old Fire House in Wagoner, Oklahoma in 2021

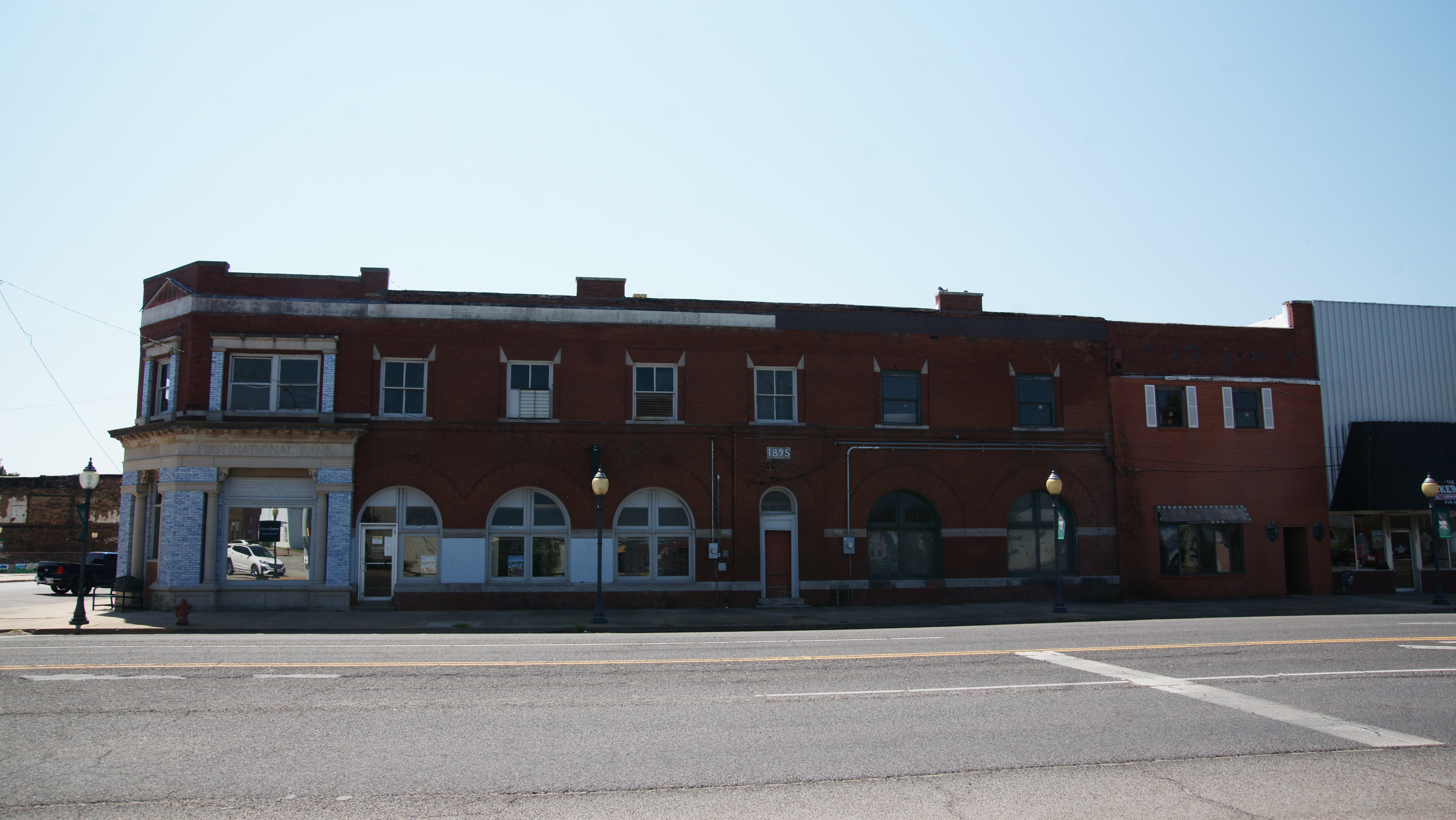
The Old Bank in downtown Wagoner, Oklahoma

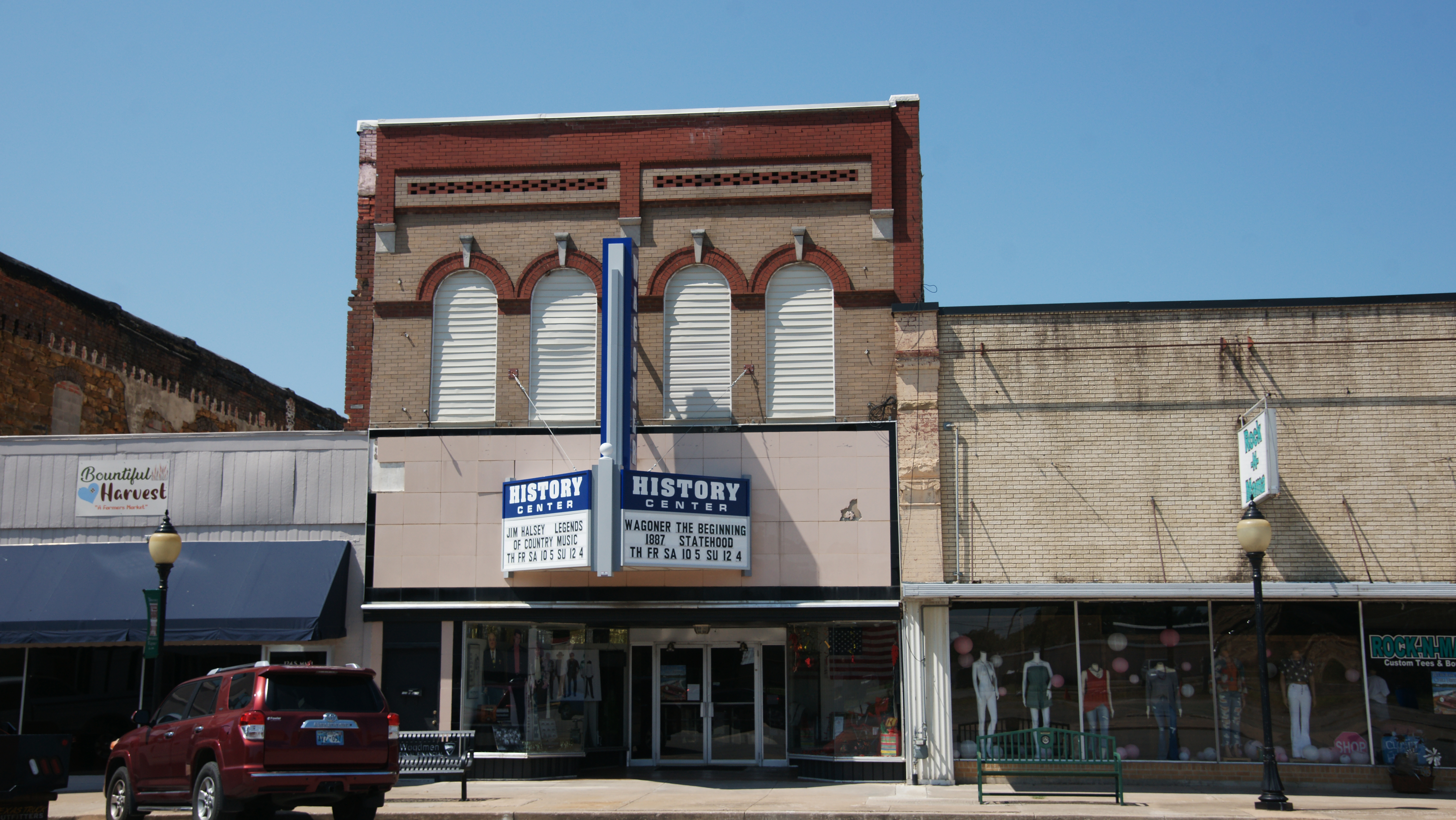
Old Theater in downtown Wagoner, Oklahoma now the History Center for Wagoner.

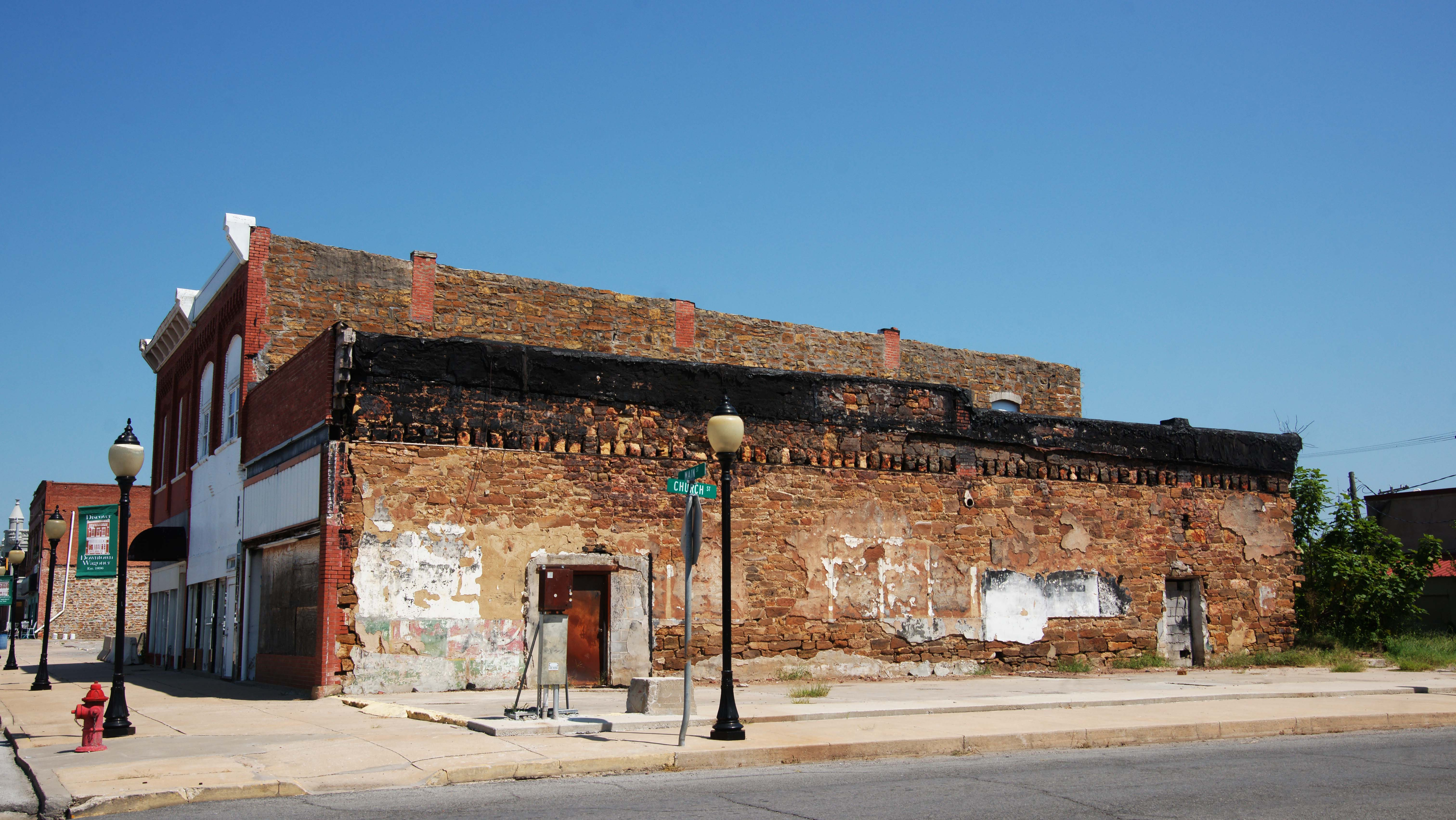
Historic Building in Downtown Wagoner, Oklahoma National Register of Historic Places

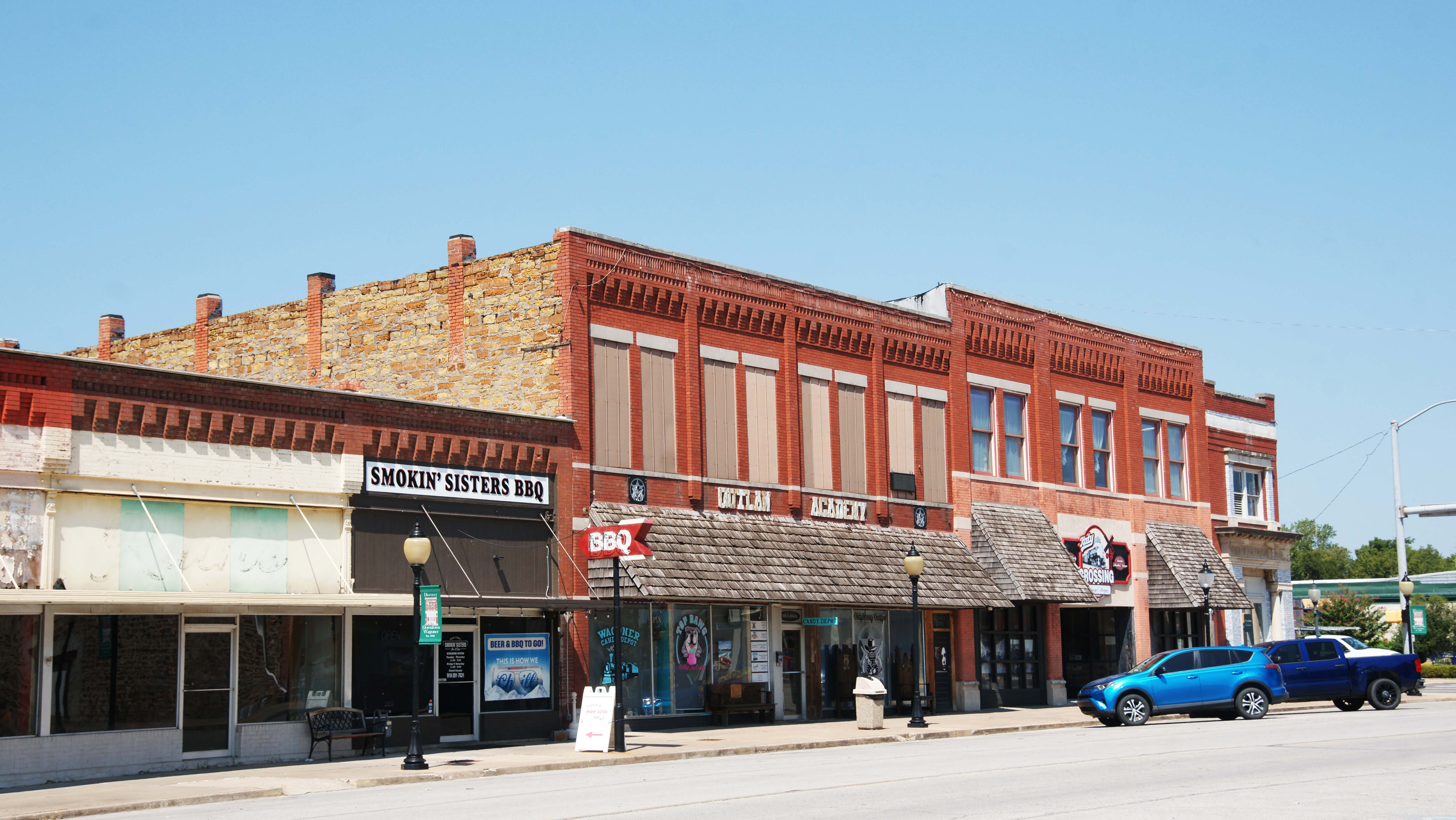
Historic Buildings in Downtown Wagoner, Oklahoma on National Register of Historic Places

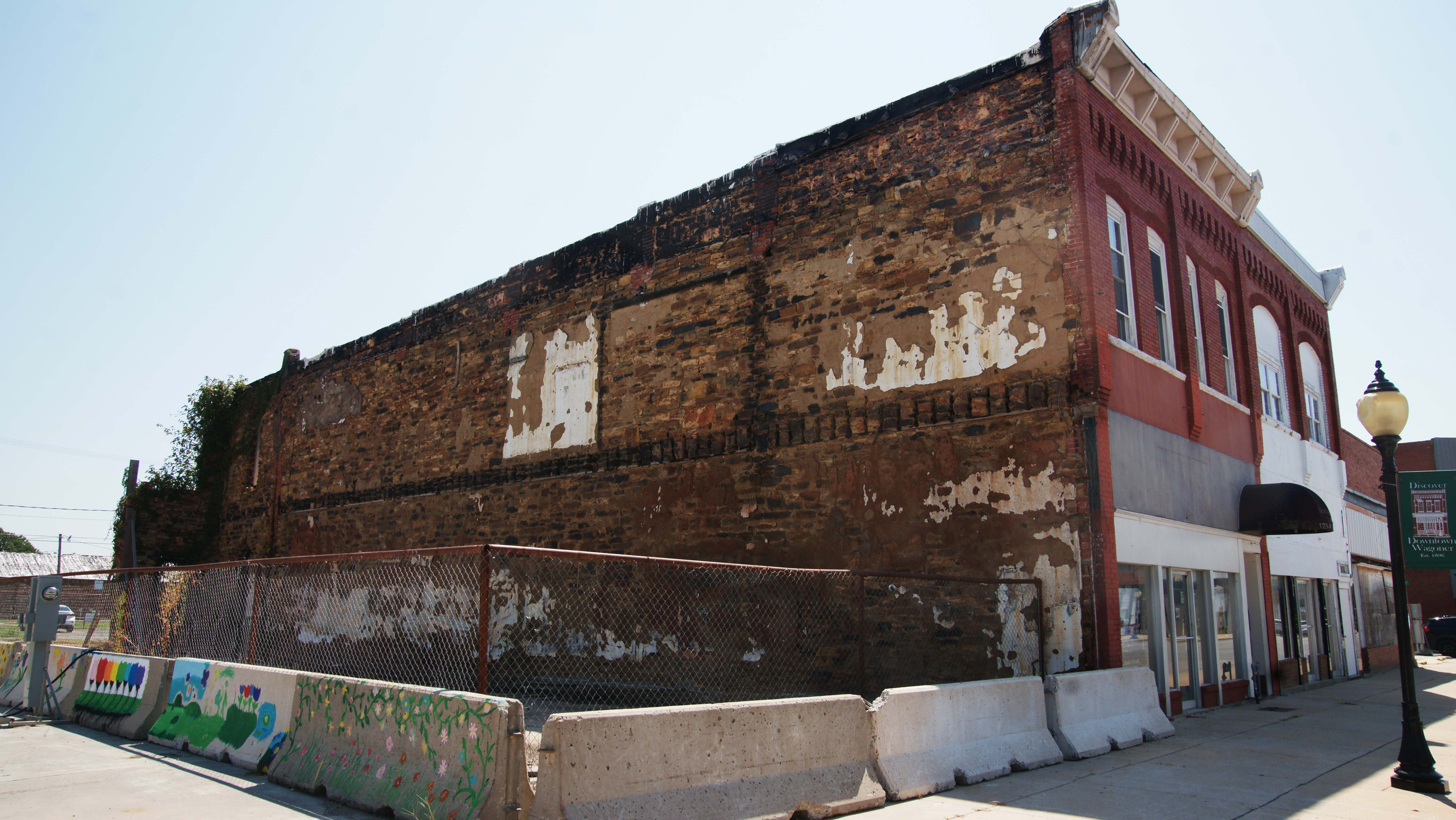
Historic Building in Downtown Wagoner, Oklahoma

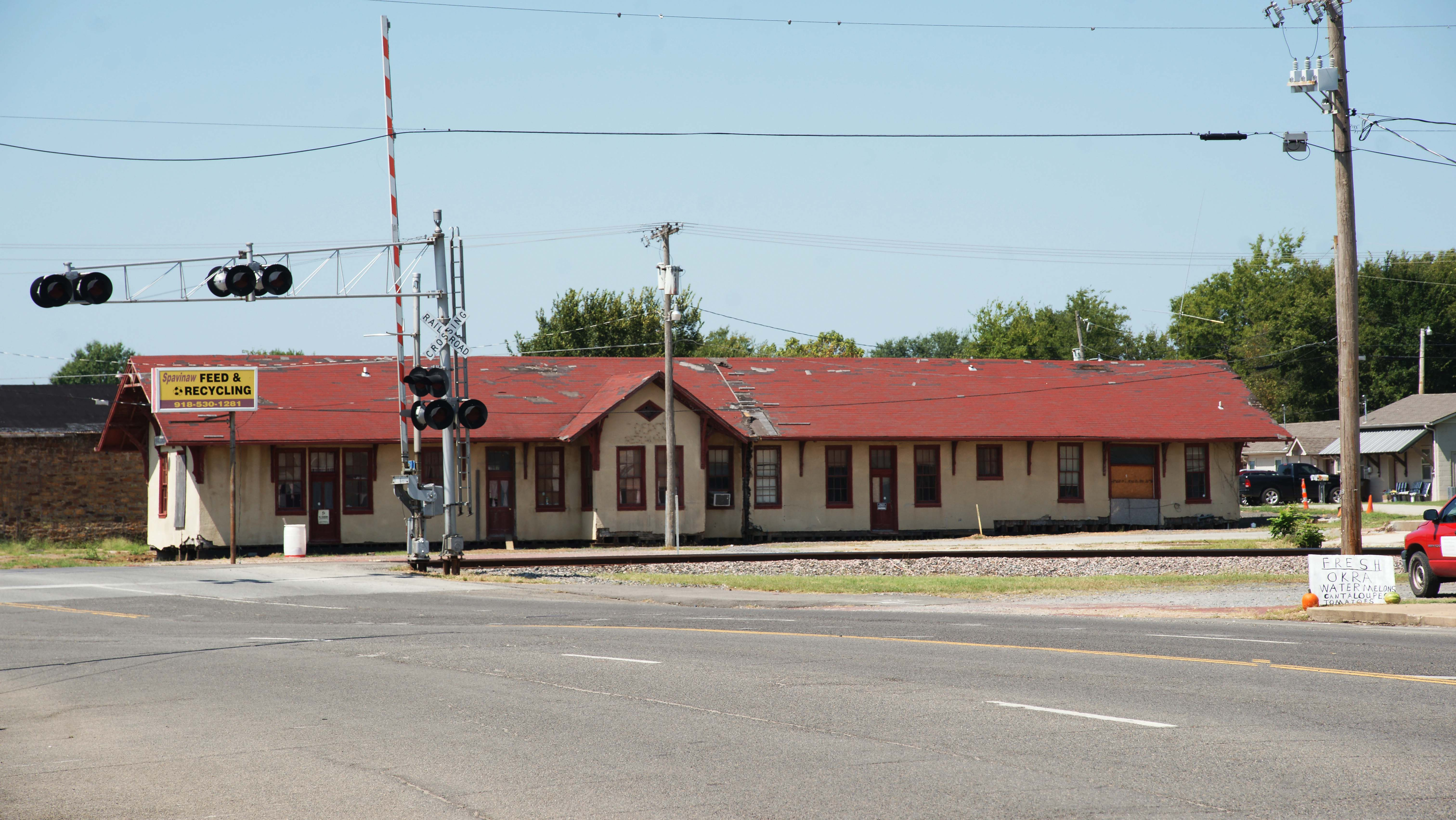
Historic Train Station in Wagoner, Oklahoma

== Geography ==
Wagoner is located at 35°57′35″N 95°22′41″W. It is 18 miles (29 km) north of Muskogee and 40 miles (64 km) east of Tulsa.

According to the United States Census Bureau, the city has a total area of 7.0 square miles (18 km^{2}), all land.

== Demographics ==
=== 2020 census ===
As of the 2020 census, Wagoner had a population of 7,621. The median age was 38.6 years. 25.3% of residents were under the age of 18 and 17.6% of residents were 65 years of age or older. For every 100 females there were 90.3 males, and for every 100 females age 18 and over there were 88.3 males age 18 and over.

96.5% of residents lived in urban areas, while 3.5% lived in rural areas.

There were 2,944 households in Wagoner, of which 33.6% had children under the age of 18 living in them. Of all households, 44.5% were married-couple households, 17.3% were households with a male householder and no spouse or partner present, and 31.2% were households with a female householder and no spouse or partner present. About 27.4% of all households were made up of individuals and 13.8% had someone living alone who was 65 years of age or older.

There were 3,374 housing units, of which 12.7% were vacant. Among occupied housing units, 59.0% were owner-occupied and 41.0% were renter-occupied. The homeowner vacancy rate was 2.5% and the rental vacancy rate was 13.8%.

Racial composition as of the 2020 census
| Race | Percent |
|---|---|
| White | 62.0% |
| Black or African American | 7.0% |
| American Indian and Alaska Native | 15.7% |
| Asian | 0.4% |
| Native Hawaiian and Other Pacific Islander | <0.1% |
| Some other race | 0.8% |
| Two or more races | 14.1% |
| Hispanic or Latino (of any race) | 3.3% |

=== 2000 census ===
As of the 2000 census, there were 7,669 people, 2,928 households, and 2,111 families residing in the city. The population density was 1,101.4 inhabitants per square mile (425.3/km^{2}). There were 3,152 housing units at an average density of 452.7 per square mile (174.8/km^{2}). The racial makeup of the city was 70.48% White, 9.27% African American, 13.21% Native American, 0.34% Asian, 0.08% Pacific Islander, 0.70% from other races, and 5.92% from two or more races. Hispanic or Latino of any race were 1.93% of the population.

There were 2,928 households, out of which 35.6% had children under the age of 18 living with them, 52.3% were married couples living together, 15.6% had a female householder with no husband present, and 27.9% were non-families. 25.1% of all households were made up of individuals, and 13.1% had someone living alone who was 65 years of age or older. The average household size was 2.58 and the average family size was 3.06.

In the city, the population was spread out, with 28.1% under the age of 18, 9.9% from 18 to 24, 26.3% from 25 to 44, 21.0% from 45 to 64, and 14.7% who were 65 years of age or older. The median age was 35 years. For every 100 females, there were 88.7 males. For every 100 females age 18 and over, there were 84.7 males.

The median income for a household in the city was $30,493, and the median income for a family was $35,426. Males had a median income of $28,163 versus $21,331 for females. The per capita income for the city was $14,178. About 12.2% of families and 15.5% of the population were below the poverty line, including 20.2% of those under age 18 and 14.5% of those age 65 or over.

== Media ==
Wagoner has one newspaper, the American-Tribune. The paper is published every Wednesday. It was owned by Community Publishers, a newspaper and Internet publisher and commercial printer that serves Oklahoma, Missouri, and Arkansas. On Tuesday, April 21, 2015, The Tulsa World announced that its parent company BH Media, a division of Berkshire Hathaway, the Omaha-based investment holding company led by billionaire Warren Buffett had purchased several suburban newspapers, including the Wagoner Tribune.

== Government ==
Wagoner uses a city council consisting of eight members and the mayor. As of April 2020 the mayor is Albert Jones.

== Transportation ==
=== Highways ===
Wagoner is served by US-69, SH-51, and SH-16, and has easy access to the Muskogee Turnpike, also known as SH-351, providing a direct route to Tulsa.

=== Airports ===
Hefner-Easley Airport (FAA Identifier—H68), owned by the City of Wagoner, is two miles directly east. Commercial flights go in and out of Tulsa International Airport, about a 45-minute drive to the northwest.

=== Railroads ===
The town has freight service from the Union Pacific, being at the intersection of the old Katy and Missouri Pacific lines now both owned by Union Pacific. Union Pacific honors Wagoner as a "Train Town USA," one of 131 communities out of 7,300 communities it serves, because of the town's unique, long-standing relationship with the railroad.

== Notable people ==
- Bob Bogle (1934–2009), a founding member of The Ventures
- Isabel Cobb (1858–1947), first woman physician in Indian Territory.
- Shelby Grant (1937–2011), actress.
- Willis Hudlin (1906–2002), major league baseball pitcher.
- Albert C. Hunt (1888–1956), politician, attorney, served as Wagoner City Attorney 1909–1959; later became Justice of Oklahoma Supreme Court
- Bobby Lane (born 1939), American football player
- Thomas Sleeper, (1956–2022) conductor and composer
- Malcolm Rodriguez (born 1999), American football player

== See also ==
- Wagoner High School
- Wagoner Armory
- Cobb Building
