= Sarah Eagle Heart =

Indigenous storyteller and activist

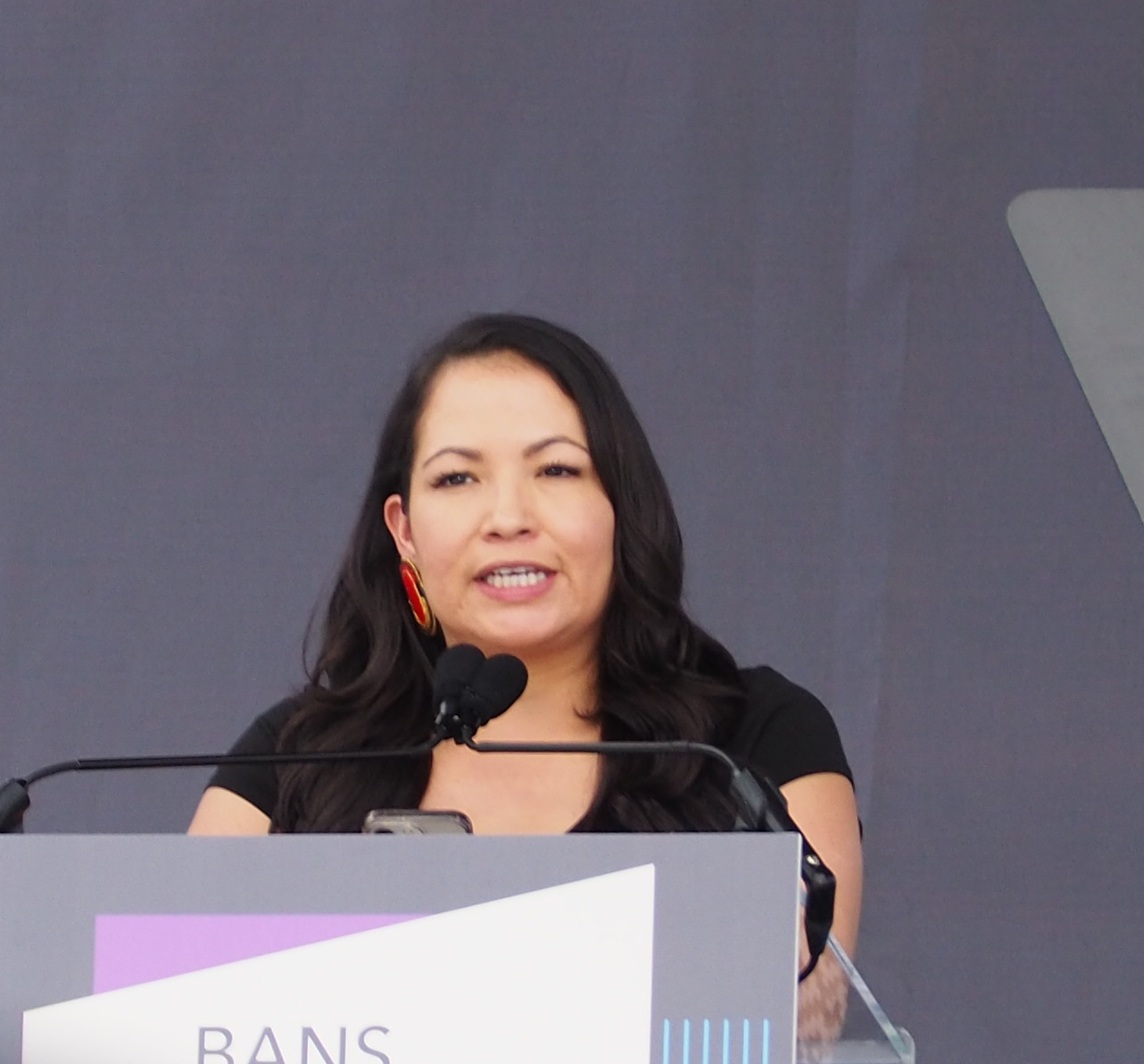
- Born: c.1977
- Occupations: Producer, writer, author, entrepreneur and advocate
- Children: 2
- Website: https://eagleheartcollectiv.com/

Sarah Eagle Heart (born c. 1977) is a Native American producer, writer, and activist. She is founder of Eagle Heart Collectiv, supporting consulting in tribal business development, philanthropy, and storytelling. She is co-founder of Return to the Heart Foundation, a grantmaking group founded in 2020 to fund Indigenous women led initiatives.

== Early life and education ==
Sarah Eagle Heart is a member of the Oglala Sioux Nation, from the Pine Ridge Reservation in South Dakota. She and her twin sister Emma have a brother Troy, two years younger. Their mother, a police officer, suffered serious head injuries when the girls were seven years old. She had to stop working, and depended on her family to raise the children, as their father was absent.

Eagle Heart became an activist while still a teen. She and her sister attended a predominately white high school in Martin, South Dakota. They suffered discrimination and bullying while there. They led a protest against the school's Indian mascots and a homecoming ceremony that featured parodies of Indian tribal figures. They were supported by the local chapter of the American Indian Movement. A few years later, the figures were withdrawn from the homecoming celebration.

Eagle Heart attended Black Hills State University where she received a Bachelor of Arts in Mass Communications with a multimedia and print emphasis and Bachelor of Science in American Indian Studies. She received her Master of Business Administration (global management emphasis) from University of Phoenix.

== Career ==
Eagle Heart has worked in a variety of venues, including in New York City for the Presiding Bishop of the Episcopal Church. As a team leader for diversity and social justice, she helped lead the church in 2009 to rejecting the Doctrine of Discovery, which had justified European claims to the Americas. The Episcopal Church was the first major Christian denomination to do so.

Eagle Heart has worked in NGOs to promote Native Americans and bring their indigenous stories to the mainstream. From 2015 to 2022, she was CEO of Native Americans in Philanthropy. This organization seeks to promote philanthropic efforts of Indigenous groups and activists.

Eagle Heart is a founding member of the National Native American Boarding School Healing Coalition. This organization seeks to create a deeper understanding of the effects of the U.S. Indian Boarding School policy and generational trauma. The Coalition has supported the Federal Indian Boarding School Initiative, created in June 2021 by Deb Haaland, Secretary of the US Department of Interior, to investigate and document the Indian boarding schools in the United States, including former territories.

=== Film and other media projects ===
Eagle Heart is a two time Emmy Winner. As a co-producer of the animated short Crow: The Legend (2018), she received an Emmy for her role as a consulting producer.

She was also a producer for the documentary Lakota Nation vs. the United States (2022), working with actor Mark Ruffalo. This film explores the conflict between Indigenous peoples and European settlers, particularly related to control of the Black Hills, sacred land to the Oglala. She has also been working on a docuseries, a horror film, and a drama film script.

Eagle Heart and her twin sister Emma Eagle Heart-White, who is a psychotherapist, published a memoir titled Warrior Princesses Strike Back: How Lakota Twins Fight Oppression and Heal through Connectedness (2023). They explore their lives as twins and their upbringing on the Pine Ridge Reservation. The work includes self-help methods for women of color, discussions of intergenerational and personal trauma, and insight into "decolonial therapy".

== Awards ==
- 2024, Emmy for Best Documentary in 2024 for her role as Executive Producer of Lakota Nation vs. United States https://www.imdb.com/news/ni64851596/
- 2019, Emmy in Outstanding Interactive Media in 2019 for her role as co-producer of Crow: The Legend.
- 2017, the American Express NGen Leadership Award.
- 2014, selected for the National Center for American Indian Enterprise Development's Top 40 under 40.

== Personal life ==
Eagle Heart had her first child at age 18 and raised two sons while completing her university degrees. She has ensured her sons have grown up with Oglala Sioux traditions, and both have participated since their youth in the Sun Dance at the reservation.
