= Alaskan habeas petitions =

Legal remedy associated with students of Native American boarding schools

Habeas petitions in Alaska often originate from families whose children were sent to boarding schools set up for Native Alaskans. These petitions allowed some families to reclaim custody of their children. These boarding schools were set up by Christian missionaries to assimilate the Native Alaskans into Euro-American culture.

== Early history of Alaskan Habeas Petitions ==
Habeas claims can be traced back to before Alaska was acquired by the United States in 1867. As native children were placed into these boarding schools, habeas claims primarily filed by mothers were the first filed in the state. These habeas claims can be dated back to when the first boarding school was built in Alaska. The first such school was established in 1878 in Sitkaby Presbyterian missionaries. Early habeas petitions were brought to federal court, and many were denied. In one case, a mother trying to get her 5-year-old child back was rejected on the grounds of relinquishment of the child being held to be binding and irrevocable. Many native parents did not understand the consequences of sending their children to boarding schools, which were sometimes advertised in local newspapers. Reports have surfaced of abuse in the schools, leading to long-term effects on former students and the tribes they came from.

=== United States vs. Sheldon Jackson (1885) ===
In an Alaskan district court in 1885, a Tlingit tribe family was one of the first to file a habeas claim for their children who attended the Presbyterian Boarding School at Sitka. After the family was denied visits, they issued a writ of habeas corpus against Dr. Sheldon Jackson, the superintendent of the Rocky Mountain district of the Presbyterian Board of Home Missions, on the basis that their children were then being held against their will. Judge Ward McAllister ruled in the favor of the Tlingit family and told the school it could not claim full custody over the students in its care.

== Long-term effects of boarding schools ==
Boarding schools existed in Alaska from as early as 1878 to around 1900, at which point they were put under the control of the federal government. Some schools remained open until the late 20th century, long after the first reports of the conditions came to light. Former students report that the abuse and separation from their native cultures that they experienced often had lifelong effects for them. Many reported that students were beaten for minor infractions, in addition to more severe abuse. Former student Jim Labelle described native children being stripped of markers of their culture, such as "difficult" names, which were replaced with numbers, and long hair, which was systematically shaved. Most students were separated from their families for a majority of the year, sometimes up to 10 months, or they could go as long as 4 years without visiting home.

While the practice of sending native children to boarding schools is viewed disfavorably in retrospect, researchers Diana Hirschberg and Suzanne Sharp were surprised to find that about 60% of former students they interviewed reported overall positive experiences at the schools. Student experiences varied widely depending on the boarding school they attended and even between individuals within a school. Many of those who described positive boarding school experiences reported coming from dysfunctional homes. Upon return from the boarding schools, many former students recall facing judgment from other tribe members for being educated, which made them different.

== Today's efforts ==
Deb Haaland, the Secretary of the Interior, has created the Federal Indian Boarding School Initiative to investigate reports of abuse in boarding schools throughout the United States. The Federal Indian Boarding School Initiative works closely with the National Native American Boarding School Healing Coalition to bring to light the mistreatment many students experienced. Assistant Secretary for Indian Affairs Bryan Newland, is responsible for preparing the Federal Indian Boarding School Initiative report. In addition to reporting the program's findings, the report also lays out the work the Department of Interior intends to do in the future. A second volume of the report is in progress as of March 2024. A second volume was recommended by Bryan Newland, as when Volume 1 was completed many federal utilities were unavailable due to the COVID-19 pandemic. Volume 2 will provide deeper insight into prior investigations of the 408 federal boarding schools they have identified.
