= National Indian Boarding School Digital Archive =

Digital archive

The National Indian Boarding School Digital Archive (NIBSDA) is a publicly available platform that includes digitized records from multiple national repositories and collections that contain material of historical significance to the U.S. boarding school era. The goal of the project is to make archival information available to Tribal nations and communities.

== Collection ==
The NIBSDA includes documentation from Indian boarding schools, student files, administrative materials, family records and enrollment lists. Boarding school records may also contain photographs, diaries, and narratives about daily activities and education. NIBSDA also includes finding aids, indexes and guides to assist users in navigating the collections.

At the time of its public launch, the NIBSDA contained the records of "nine of the federal Indian boarding schools," those being:

- Chemawa Indian School, Oregon
- Flandreau Indian School, South Dakota
- Fort Bidwell Indian School, California
- Mount Pleasant Indian Industrial Boarding School, Michigan
- Mt. Edgecumbe Boarding School, Alaska
- Pipestone Indian Training School, Minnesota
- Stewart Indian School, Nevada

Alongside its collection, NIBSDA offers resources for visitors for whom the content "may trigger secondary trauma or PTSD".

== Development ==
The National Native American Boarding School Healing Coalition (NABS) began developing the NIBSDA in 2018. In 2023, the project was awarded a $30,000 grant from the National Endowment for the Humanities. Some 20,000 documents held by Haverford College and Swarthmore College, originating from at least nine Indian boarding schools and dating from 1852 to 1945, were digitized with the help of a $124,000 grant from the National Historical Publications and Records Commission.

The archive was launched to the public in May 2024.
