= American Indian boarding school gravesites =

Discovery of marked and unmarked indigenous graves

On 30 July 2024, a federal government investigation commissioned by United States Secretary of the Interior Deb Haaland revealed that it had found gravesites at sixty-five of over 417 United States federal boarding schools used for forceful assimilation of Native American children into European American culture and society. As a result of the federal boarding school system, "at least" 973 Native American children were found to have died, many of whom were buried in unmarked or marked graves.

== Background ==
American Indian boarding schools were established in the United States from the mid-17th to the early 20th centuries with a primary objective of "civilizing" or assimilating Native American children and youth into Anglo-American culture. In the process, these schools denigrated Native American culture and made children give up their languages and religion. They took classes on how to conduct manual labor, which included farming, housekeeping, brick-making, and railroad work. When not in class, they were expected to maintain upkeep of the schools. Unclean and overpopulated living conditions led to the spread of disease and many students did not receive enough food. Bounties were offered for students who tried to run away and many students committed suicide. Students who died were sometimes placed in coffins and buried in the school cemetery by their own classmates.

The schools were usually harsh, especially for younger children who had been forcibly separated from their families and forced to abandon their Native American identities and cultures. Children sometimes died in the school system due to infectious disease. Investigations of the later 20th century revealed cases of physical, emotional, and sexual abuse.

An initial investigation launched in 2022 estimated that over five hundred children died while part of the school system.

== Investigation ==
An investigation by the federal government commissioned by United States Secretary of the Interior Deb Haaland— the first Native American cabinet secretary— investigated over 400 American Indian boarding school sites to determine the location of deceased children, their gravesites, and details surrounding their life and death in the institutions.

On 30 July 2024, findings of the investigation were released. The findings indicated that at least 973 Native American children were discovered to have died in the boarding school system, with sixty-five of the surveyed schools possessing gravesites with buried children. Of these, twenty-one unmarked gravesites and fifty-three marked gravesites were found. The investigation determined that while specific causes of death could not yet be determined, that the primary causes of death were from illness and abuse. The investigation also noted that the true number of deaths could be higher based on unknown numbers of children who died from illness caught at the school after being sent away from it. Additional reasons for unaccounted deaths or gravesites included unrecorded deaths outside of the 1819-1969 period, deaths from non-federally funded schools, deaths in institutions without public records, and deaths in assimilatory institutions that were not schools including asylums, day schools, orphanages, and dormitories.

Deb Haaland characterized the boarding school system as a "concerted attempt to eradicate the 'Indian problem'" through assimilation or outright wiping out Native American culture. While expressing personal remorse, Haaland suggested that the United States federal government needed to make a formal apology on behalf of the abuse, death, and trauma caused by the school system. The Department of the Interior recommended compensation for the Native American communities with government spending proportional to the estimated US$23.3 billion (inflation-adjusted) federal expenditure granted to the federal boarding school system. It also recommended significant investment in programs to help the Native American communities recover from trauma caused by the federal boarding school system, placing government funding into education, violence prevention, and programs for revitalizing Indigenous languages.

== Haskell-Baker Wetlands ==
The South Lawrence Trafficway, an extension of highway K-10, was delayed for several decades; one reason for the delay was an investigation into the claim that children from Haskell had been buried in unmarked graves in the wetlands, in addition to the marked graves located in the cemetery there. Investigations have found no evidence of such burials in the wetlands. However, there are still calls for any further development to require searches for potential gravesites.

== Tribe groups of the deceased children ==
The below table documents the associated tribes of each children that died in the federal boarding school system:

Deceased Students of Federal Indian Boarding Schools (FIBS) by Tribe Group
Tribe Group	Number of deceased students
Alaskan	31
Apache	91
Arapaho	14
Blackfeet	8
Caddo Confederacy	1
Cheyenne	15
Cheyenne Arapaho, Oklahoma	3
Comanche	3
Confederated Grand Ronde	1
Confederated Umatilla	1
Confederated Warm Springs	3
Confederated Yakama	2
Crow	4
Five Tribes - Cherokee	18
Five Tribes - Chickasaw	2
Five Tribes - Choctaw	38
Five Tribes - Creek, Muscogee, Seminole	8
Gros Ventre	8
Ho-Chunk, Winnebago	2
Iowa	1
Kickapoo	2
Kiowa	4
Klamath, Modoc, Yahooskin	10
Mandan, Hidatsa, Arikara	19
Menominee	2
Navajo	136
Nez Perce	15
Northern Arapaho	3
Northern Cheyenne	3
Ojibwe, Ottawa, Potawatomi	51
Omaha	2
Oneida	8
Other	6
Catawba, Issa, Essa, Iswa	1
Umpqua	1
Other Tribes - Pacific (Karuk, Luiseno, Mission Indians, Quartz Valley, Klamath, Shasta, Tolowa Dee-ni', Smith River)	9
Other Tribes - Western (Havasupai, Yava Supai, Hualapai, Mohave, Mojave, Quechan, Yuma, Washoe, Washo)	13
Paiute, Shoshone, Bannock	42
Pawnee	6
Peoria, Miami, Illinois Confederacy	1
Pima, Maricopa	23
Pit River Tribe	1
Pomo	1
Ponca	1
Pueblo	34
Quapaw	2
Sac and Fox	6
Salish	12
Seneca	4
Shawnee	2
Sioux, Assiniboine	67
Tohono O'odham	18
Ute	19
Wichita	4
Not Yet Identified	238

== See also ==
- Canadian Indian residential school gravesites
- Federal Indian Boarding School Initiative
