= St. Mary's Mission =

St. Mary's Mission may refer to:

- St. Mary's Mission (Kansas), a Jesuit mission founded in 1847 along the Oregon Trail
- St. Mary's Mission (Montana), a historic mission church in Stevensville, Montana
- St. Mary's Mission boarding school (Minnesota), a Benedictine school on the Red Lake Indian Reservation
