= St Mary's Mission =

St. Mary's Mission may refer to:

- St. Mary's Mission (Kansas)
- St. Mary's Mission (Montana)
- St. Mary's Mission boarding school (Minnesota), a Benedictine school on the Red Lake Indian Reservation
