= Grand Junction Regional Center =

Grand Junction Regional Center is a center in Grand Junction, Colorado, providing services to people with intellectual and developmental disabilities. It was previously known as the State Home for Mental Defectives. It is located on the site of the now-defunct Teller Institute, an off-reservation boarding school that attempted to forcefully assimilate Indigenous people from the Western United States.

== Teller Indian School ==
Colorado Senator Henry Teller petitioned Congress for approval for an off-reservation boarding school with the aim of assimilating the Ute tribe. The school was modeled after the Carlisle Indian School in Pennsylvania. According to Pratt, the founder of the Carlisle Indian School, assimilation was only possible with total removal from their home and culture and immersion in mainstream white society. The Grand Junction Indian School was opened in 1886. It was soon renamed the Teller Indian School after Henry Teller, and later the Teller Institute. The Teller School was the seventh federal off-reservation boarding school and the first in the mountain west.

The boarding school was intended to provide an eight-grade education and industrial training. The school was intended to be self-sufficient with students forced to do manual labor. Teachers taught boys to "till the soil, shove the plane, strike the anvil, and drive the peg" and girls "do the work of the good and skillful housewife." However, the school had issues growing crops due to the poor land, as well as issues with drinking water and the sewage system.

The Ute did not want to send their children to the boarding school. The Whiteriver and Uncompahgre Ute had been forcibly expelled from their lands in Colorado and sent to the Uintah and Ouray Reservation in Utah. In 1887, the Colorado state government claimed the Utes had violated state game laws and invaded a Ute encampment in southwest Colorado, capturing one Ute boy and killing another Ute boy. When the Utes fled to Utah, the Governor of Colorado called on the militia to apprehend them. Indian Agent T. A. Byrnes claimed the Indian parents from the Ouray agency were not prepared to send their children to the Grand Junction School at Colorado, for they were told that any "Ute Indians crossing the Colorado line would be shot on sight."
