= White Earth Boarding School =

White Earth Boarding Schools were Native American boarding schools established in Minnesota in an attempt to assimilate White Earth Nation children to white societal expectations.

== Background ==
Initially the government founded a boarding, or industrial, school in 1871. This school was the first of 16 boarding schools established in the state, and it remained open until 1919. In 1878, the Saint Benedict Monastery also opened a day school, which was later designated as a boarding school in 1892. This boarding school was closed in 1945. Students at these schools were often forcibly taken from their homes and subjected to harsh forms of discipline, as well as forced to complete manual labor. The unjust conditions led to the schools closing and also formal apologies being issued by the Saint Benedict Monastery nuns.
