= Johnson–O'Malley Act =

1934 U.S. law

The Johnson–O'Malley Act was law of the United States Congress passed on April 16, 1934, to subsidize education, medical attention, and other services provided by states to Native Americans, especially those not living on reservations. It was effective only in Minnesota.

The act was part of the Indian New Deal of the 1930s to help offset costs of tax-exempt Indians making use of public schools, hospitals, and other services. This was a time in Indian-white relations when "Indian reformers attempted to reduce the grip the Bureau of Indian Affairs held on virtually every aspect of the lives of reservation Indians." It also helped to provide for Native Americans in rural areas, where it was more difficult for the Federal Government to provide education, medical attention, and other services to them. The Act consists of five sections.

The first section authorizes the Secretary of the Interior to arrange contracts between the United States Government and the States or Territories for the education, medical attention, relief of distress, and social welfare of Indians residing in the States or Territories recognized. These contracts would be authorized through and for the use of qualified agencies of these States or Territories. Under these contracts, the Federal Government would expend money appropriated by Congress for the purposes of the Act to the States, Territories, and Agencies involved.

The second section gives the Secretary of the Interior the ability to authorize the States to make use of existing school buildings, hospitals and other facilities, and the equipment needed in order for these facilities to function properly for the purposes of the Act.

The third section gives the Secretary authority to perform any acts to make it possible to perform the provisions of the Johnson–O'Malley Act. Including communicating with school and medical professionals, negotiating terms of the contracts, and setting minimum standards for service, as long as the minimums set are not less than the highest maintained for like purposes by the State or Territory in which it will be in effect.

The fourth section states that the Secretary of the Interior will report annually to congress all of the contracts formed under the provisions of the Act, and all money expended under these contracts.

The fifth section excludes the State of Oklahoma from the provisions of the Act.

Education is the main purpose and beneficiary of the act, as individual states, territories, schools, and school districts wanted to be compensated for Indian students who did not contribute tax money mixed in with the general population. Education is also the provision that most notably takes advantage of the act. The Legislatures that passed the act believed it would be advisable to have the Indian students in the public schools rather than providing separate schools for them. These public schools would receive funds through the act for educating the Indian students. The act was one of the principal means for subsidizing education for Indian students in the United States. This way of subsidizing costs for Indian students by the federal government had been going on in an "ad hoc" basis since 1890 up until the official Act was passed in 1934.

A modern provision of the act "gives parents of Indian children in local schools some input into educational decisions made by schools that receive federal funds pursuant to the act. Local committees of Indian parents have the power to approve or disapprove of school programs funded under the Act." This places more power in local citizens, as opposed to public officials, than is normal.

== See also ==
- Native American boarding schools
