= Interdictum de homine libero exhibendo =

Mechanism to challenge unlawful detention

The interdictum de homine libero exhibendo was a form of interdictum in Roman law ordering a man who unlawfully holds a free man as a slave to produce this man in court. In modern Roman-Dutch law it has been developed into a mechanism to challenge unlawful detention, equivalent to the writ of habeas corpus in English common law.

== Ancient Rome ==
The Favian law (lex Fabi) made the purchase, sale, donation, or acceptance of a freeman, if done wittingly, a capital crime; and the pecuniary penalty provided by that law having fallen out of practice, those guilty of "plagiary", or man-stealing (which appears to have been a common offence, both as regarded slaves and freemen) were condemned to the mines for the delictum, a fine of twenty aurei, amputation of the hand, etc. The Salic law provided that nobles guilty of plagiary should be scourged and imprisoned, slaves and freedmen exposed to the beasts, and freemen decapitated.

== Roman-Dutch law ==
In South Africa and other countries whose legal systems are based on Roman-Dutch law, the interdictum de homine libero exhibendo is a remedy by which a person who is arrested or detained can challenge the legality of his or her detention, and be released if it is found to be unlawful. It is the equivalent of the writ of habeas corpus in English law.

An application for the interdictum may be made in a superior court either by the detainee or by a family member, friend or interested party on their behalf. It takes priority over other matters on the court roll, and is usually heard by a single judge. If the court finds prima facie evidence that the detention is unlawful, it will order the authority responsible to bring the detainee before the court within a short period of time and show cause why they should not be released. On the return date of the order, if the court is not satisfied that the detention is lawful, the court will order the immediate release of the detainee.

In South Africa the interdictum has been entrenched in the Bill of Rights, which provides in section 35(2)(d) that every detained person has the right to challenge the lawfulness of the detention in person before a court and, if the detention is unlawful, to be released.
