= Rich-Heape Films =

Rich-Heape Films, Inc. was founded in 1994 to inform, educate and encourage awareness of native peoples, and to preserve the history and culture of the American Indian.

The company is headquartered in Dallas, Texas. It specializes in film, video, high definition, and multimedia production from initial concept to final product. The American Indian Chamber of Commerce recognized Rich-Heape Films as Business of the Year in 1999 and 2003 and, most recently, American Indian Advocate of the Year 2006.

Rich-Heape Films is managed by Steven R. Heape, a Cherokee Indian, and Chip Richie, a second-generation filmmaker.
