= Our Fires Still Burn =

Documentary film about Native Americans

- Directed by: Audrey Geyer
- Produced by: Audrey Geyer
- Music by: Warren Petoskey
- Production company: Visions LLC
- Release date: 2013
- Running time: 60 minutes
- Country: United States

Our Fires Still Burn is a one-hour documentary produced by Audrey Geyer that explores the experiences of contemporary Native Americans through a compilation of first-person narratives ranging from midwestern Native Americans in "Indian boarding schools" where children were forced for assimilation. The documentary depicts the personal stories of Native American role models from all walks of life, including a successful businessman, journalist, artist, and youth advocate, as well as tribal and spiritual leaders. The documentary still continues to be run by the Public Broadcast System (PBS).

== Response ==
The Tribal College Review’s Ryan Winn called the film "part historical record, part rallying cry" and said that "the film's potency derives from those stories in which years of adversity have given way to times of cultural pride and preservation." Constance Bailey of the Journal of American Folklore said, "Geyer masterfully frames the relationship between language and culture that she weaves throughout the production."
