= Audrey Geyer =

American film producer

Audrey Geyer (born January 7, 1966) is an American documentary filmmaker, video producer and director based in Michigan. Geyer acts as the founder and executive director of a non-profit 501(c)3 independent video production company based in metro Detroit. Having worked in film for nearly two decades, she has primarily produced public affairs documentaries that aired on the Public Broadcasting System (PBS) and directed independent documentaries that encompass Native American issues and history.

== Early life ==
Geyer graduated with bachelor's degrees in film and video studies and literature from the University of Michigan in Ann Arbor in 1988. In 1992, she started at the NYU Silver School of Social Work's MSW program. Following graduation from the program in 1994 with her MSW certification, she practiced clinically for 11 years working in an outpatient mental health clinic in The Bronx, providing group facilitation for Gilda's Club and the National Multiple Sclerosis Society, and maintaining a private practice.

In 2007, she founded Visions, a non-profit 501(c)3 independent video production company based in metro Detroit. As a founder of Visions, she has produced several documentaries including Our Fires Still Burn.

== Our Fires Still Burn ==
Our Fires Still Burn is a one-hour documentary that explores the experiences of contemporary Native Americans through a compilation of first-person narratives ranging from midwestern Native Americans in so-called "Indian boarding schools"—places where Native American children were forcibly boarded for assimilation purposes in the nineteenth and twentieth centuries—juxtaposed with powwows and fire-lighting ceremonies and scenes of performance art.

In 2014, the project was announced as one of 13 projects to receive a Public Media Content Fund Award by Vision Maker Media.

When she started the project, Geyer partnered with Steve Spreitzer at the Michigan Roundtable for Diversity and Inclusion. Spreitzer introduced Geyer to members of the Saginaw Chippewa Indian Tribe near Mount Pleasant, Michigan. From here, Geyer met individually with all of her subjects and compiled the stories into the documentary, which premiered in 2013 and has been played at several libraries and universities around the country. The music for the documentary was composed by Warren Petoskey, a Native American from Petoskey, Michigan.

Currently, Geyer is producing a documentary on Native American lawyers and law systems entitled Warrior Lawyers.

== Filmography ==
Documentaries
Year	Title	Notes
2013	Our Fires Still Burn	
	Warrior Lawyers	
