= American Indian boarding schools =

Schools for assimilating Native Americans

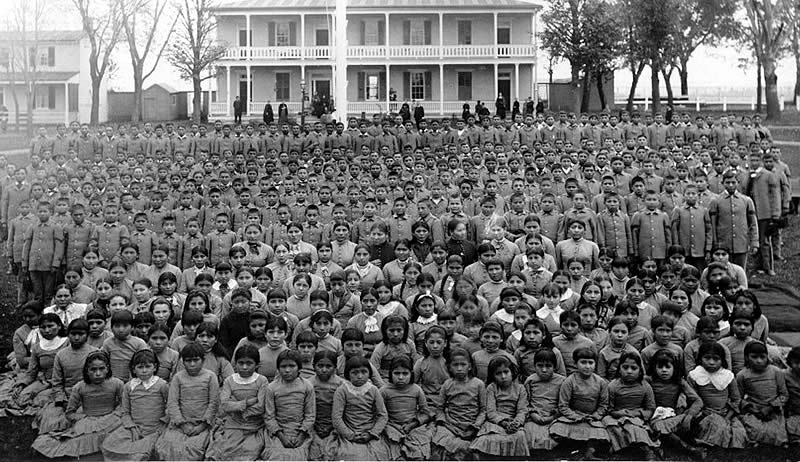
Pupils at Carlisle Indian Industrial School, Pennsylvania, 1900

American Indian boarding schools, also known more recently as American Indian residential schools, were established in the United States from the mid-17th to the early 20th centuries with a main primary objective of "civilizing" or assimilating Native American children and youth into Anglo-American culture. In the process, these schools denigrated American Indian culture and made children give up their languages and religion. At the same time the schools provided a basic Western education. These boarding schools were first established by Christian missionaries of various denominations. The missionaries were often approved by the federal government of the United States to start both missions and schools on reservations, especially in the lightly populated areas of the West. In the late 19th and early 20th centuries especially, the government paid Church denominations to provide basic education to Native American children on reservations, and later established its own schools on reservations. The Bureau of Indian Affairs (BIA) also founded additional off-reservation boarding schools. Similarly to schools that taught speakers of immigrant languages, the curriculum was rooted in linguistic imperialism, the English-only movement, and forced assimilation enforced by corporal punishment. These sometimes drew children from a variety of tribes. In addition, religious orders established off-reservation schools.

Children were typically immersed in the Anglo-American culture of the upper class. Schools forced removal of indigenous cultural signifiers: cutting the children's hair, having them wear American-style uniforms, forbidding them from speaking their mother tongues, and replacing their tribal names with English language names (saints' names under some religious orders) for use at the schools, as part of assimilation and to Christianize them. The schools were usually harsh, especially for younger children who had been forcibly separated from their families and forced to abandon their Native American identities and cultures. Children sometimes died in the school system due to infectious disease. Investigations of the later 20th century revealed cases of physical, emotional, and sexual abuse.

Summarizing recent scholarship from Native perspectives, Dr. Julie Davis said:

Boarding schools embodied both victimization and agency for Native people and they served as sites of both cultural loss and cultural persistence. These institutions, intended to assimilate Native people into mainstream society and eradicate Native cultures, became integral components of American Indian identities and eventually fueled the drive for political and cultural self-determination in the late 20th century.

Since those years, tribal nations have carried out political activism and gained legislation and federal policy that gives them the power to decide how to use federal education funds, how they educate their children, and the authority to establish their own community-based schools. Tribes have also founded numerous tribal colleges and universities on reservations. Tribal control over their schools has been supported by federal legislation and changing practices by the BIA. By 2007, most of the boarding schools had been closed down, and the number of Native American children in boarding schools had declined to 9,500.

Although there are hundreds of deceased Indigenous children yet to be found, investigations are increasing across the United States.

== History of education of American Indians by European colonists ==
... instead of exterminating a part of the human race ... we had persevered ... and at last had imparted our Knowledge of cultivating and the arts, to the Aboriginals of the Country ... But it has been conceived to be impracticable to civilize the Indians of North America – This opinion is probably more convenient than just.

— Henry Knox to George Washington, 1789.

In the late eighteenth century, reformers starting with President George Washington and Henry Knox, in efforts to "civilize" or otherwise assimilate Native Americans, adopted the practice of assimilating Native American children in current American culture. At the time the society was dominated by agriculture, with many yeomen subsistence farmers, and rural society made up of some small towns and few large cities. The Civilization Fund Act of 1819 promoted this policy by providing funding to societies (mostly religious missionaries) who worked on Native American education, often at schools established in or near Native American communities. The reformers believed this policy would help the Indians survive increasing contact with European-American settlers who were moving west into their territories.

Moses Tom sent his children to an Indian boarding school.

I rejoice, brothers, to hear you propose to become cultivators of the earth for the maintenance of your families. Be assured you will support them better and with less labor, by raising stock and bread, and by spinning and weaving clothes, than by hunting. A little land cultivated, and a little labor, will procure more provisions than the most successful hunt; and a woman will clothe more by spinning and weaving, than a man by hunting. Compared with you, we are but as of yesterday in this land. Yet see how much more we have multiplied by industry, and the exercise of that reason which you possess in common with us. Follow then our example, brethren, and we will aid you with great pleasure ...

— President Thomas Jefferson, Brothers of the Choctaw Nation, December 17, 1803

== Early mission schools ==
In 1634, Fr. Andrew White of the English Province of the Society of Jesus established a mission in what is now Southern Maryland. He said the purpose of the mission, as an interpreter told the chief of a Native American tribe there, was "to extend civilization and instruction to his ignorant race, and show them the way to heaven". The mission's annual records report that by 1640, they had founded a community they named St. Mary's. Native Americans were sending their children there to be educated, including the daughter of Tayac, the Pascatoe chief. She was likely an exception because of her father's status, as girls were generally not educated with boys in English Catholic schools of the period. Other students discussed in the records were male.

The same records report that in 1677,

a school for humanities was opened by our Society in the centre of Maryland, directed by two of the Fathers; and the native youth, applying themselves assiduously to study, made good progress. Maryland and the recently established school sent two boys to St. Omer who yielded in abilities to few Europeans, when competing for the honour of being first in their class. So that not gold, nor silver, nor the other products of the earth alone, but men also are gathered from thence to bring those regions, which foreigners have unjustly called ferocious, to a higher state of virtue and cultivation.

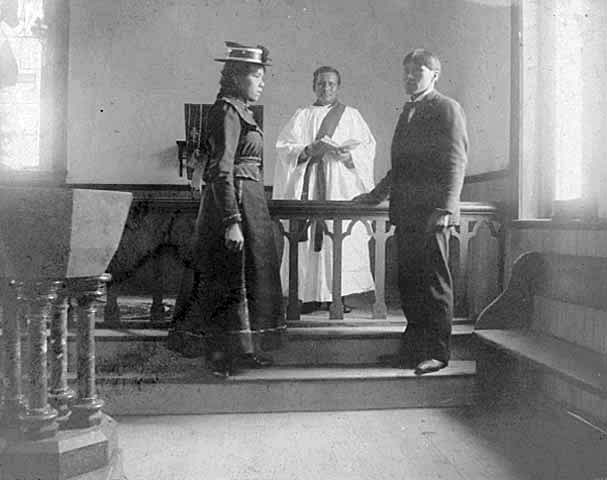
Young woman and young man standing at a church altar with a priest

In the mid-1600s, Harvard College established the Harvard Indian College on its campus in Cambridge, Massachusetts Bay Colony, supported by the Anglican Society for Propagation of the Gospel. Its few Native American students came from New England. In this period higher education was very limited for all classes, and most 'colleges' taught at a level more similar to today's high schools. In 1665, Caleb Cheeshahteaumuck, "from the Wampanoag...did graduate from Harvard, the first Indian to do so in the colonial period".

In the early colonial years, other Indian schools were created by local New England communities, as with the Indian school in Lebanon, Connecticut in 1754. This would eventually become a parallel institution to Dartmouth College, which has retained some programs for Native Americans. Other schools were also created in the East, such as in Bethlehem, Pennsylvania by Moravian missionaries. Religious missionaries from various denominations developed the first schools as part of their missions near indigenous settlements, believing they could extend education and Christianity to Native Americans. Moravian missionaries launched these schools with the intention of converting Native Americans and growing their church numbers. They were able to get government funding and launch this initiative on a large scale because their work also served the US government's purpose of shrinking Native American territory at the time. East of the Appalachian Mountains, most Indians had been forced off their traditional lands before the American Revolutionary War. They had few reservations.

In the early nineteenth century, the new republic continued to deal with questions about how Native American peoples would live. The Foreign Mission School, a Protestant-backed institution that opened in Cornwall, Connecticut, in 1816, was set up for male students from a variety of non-Christian peoples, mostly abroad. Native Hawaiians, Muslim and Hindu students from India and Southeast Asia were among the nearly 100 total who attended during its decade of operation. Also enrolled were Native American students from the Cherokee and Choctaw tribes (among the Five Civilized Tribes of the American Southeast), as well as Lenape (a mid-Atlantic tribe) and Osage students. It was intended to train young people as missionaries, interpreters, translators, etc. who could help guide their peoples. In some cases, students from this operation left their tribes entirely and assimilated into these religious communities. One instance of this would be when a Cherokee student by the name of John Ridge married the daughter of a trustee of the Foreign Mission School, Sara Northrup.

== Nationhood, Indian Wars, and western settlement ==
Through the 19th century, the encroachment of European Americans on Indian lands continued. From the 1830s, tribes from both the Southeast and the Great Lakes areas were pushed west of the Mississippi, forced off their lands to Indian Territory. As part of the treaties signed for land cessions, the United States was supposed to provide education to the tribes on their reservations. Some religious orders and organizations established missions in Kansas and what later became Oklahoma to work on these new reservations. Some of the Southeast tribes established their own schools, as the Choctaw did for both girls and boys.

After the Civil War and decades of Indian Wars in the West, more tribes were forced onto reservations after ceding vast amounts of land to the US. With the goal of assimilation, believed necessary so that tribal Indians could survive to become part of American society, the government increased its efforts to provide education opportunities. Some of this was related to the progressive movement, which believed the only way for the tribal peoples to make their way was to become assimilated, as American society was rapidly changing and urbanizing. It is important to make the distinction that the attacks on white supremacy and the promotion of equality (by the progressive movement) was not the driving force behind the creation of these schools. This is supported by Democratic representative Allen Thurman (who served from the 1860s to 1880s), who explains that the concept of US citizenship (as proposed by progressives) both championed equality for most people in the US while taking a hostile approach to Native Americans, as they believed that their sovereign identity had to be erased in order for the US to establish common citizenship rights.

Following the Indian Wars, missionaries founded additional schools in the West with boarding facilities. Given the vast areas and isolated populations, they could support only a limited number of schools. Some children necessarily had to attend schools that were distant from their communities. Initially under President Ulysses S. Grant, only one religious organization or order was permitted on any single reservation. The various denominations lobbied the government to be permitted to set up missions, even in competition with each other.

== Assimilation-era day schools ==
Day schools were also created to implement federal mandates. Compared to boarding schools, day schools were a less expensive option that usually received less parental pushback.

One example is the Fallon Indian Day School opened on the Stillwater Indian Reservation in 1908. Even after the process of closing boarding schools started, day schools remained open.

== Carlisle Indian Industrial School ==
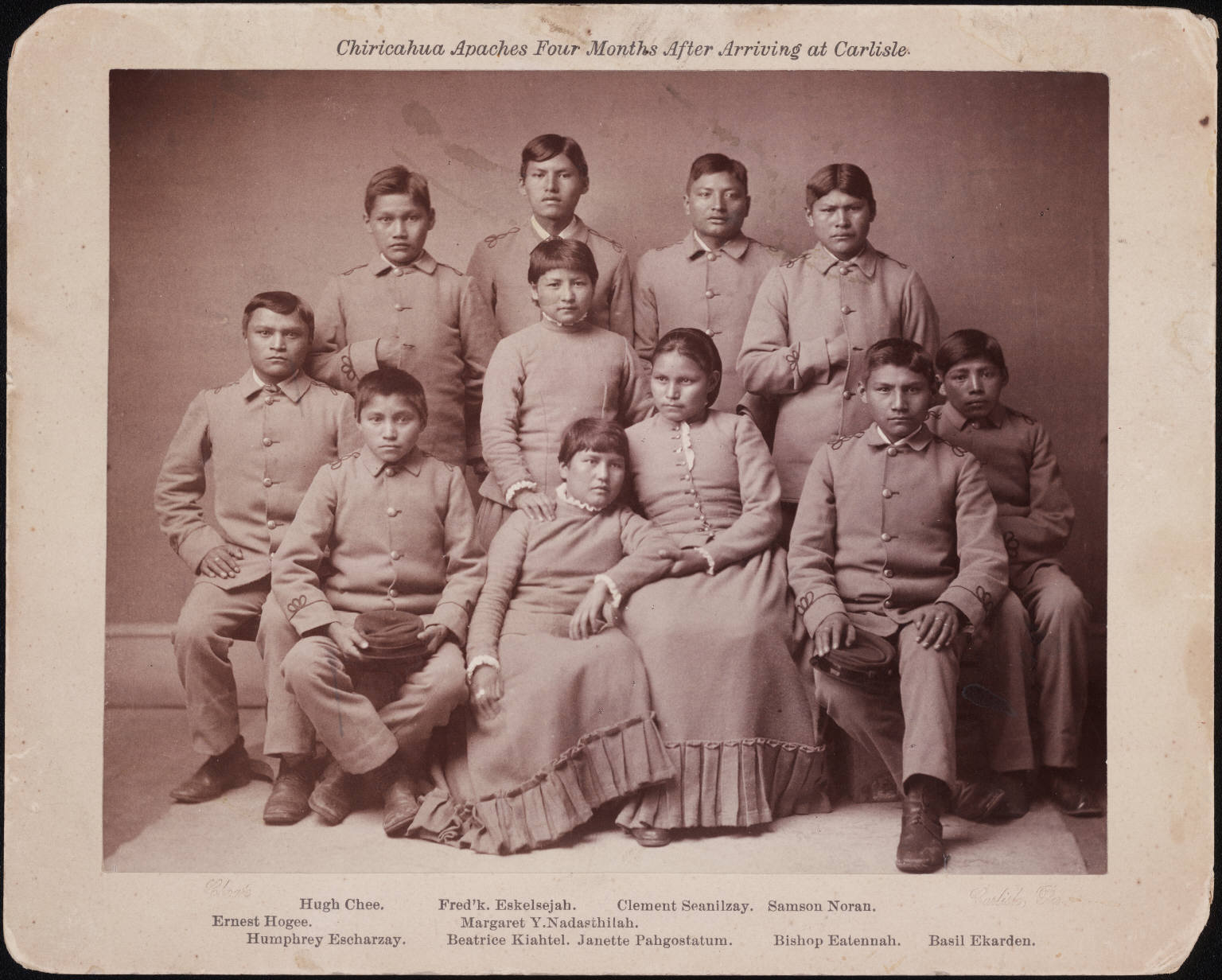
Chiricahua Apaches Four Months After Arriving at Carlisle. Undated photograph taken at Carlisle Indian Industrial School.

After the Indian Wars, Lieutenant Richard Henry Pratt was assigned to supervise Native prisoners of war at Fort Marion which was located in St. Augustine, Florida. The United States Army sent seventy-two warriors from the Cheyenne, Kiowa, Comanche and Caddo nations, to exile in St. Augustine, Florida. They were used as hostages to encourage their peoples in the West to remain peaceful.

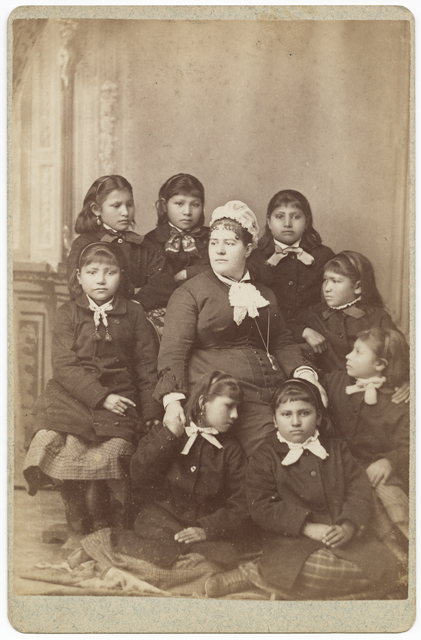
Teacher Mary R. Hyde and students at Carlisle Indian Training School

Pratt began to work with them on education in European-American culture, essentially a kind of immersion. While he required changes: the men had to cut their hair and wear common uniforms rather than their traditional clothes, he also granted them increased autonomy and the ability to govern themselves within the prison. Pleased by his success, he was said to have supported the motto, "Kill the Indian, Save the Man." Pratt said in a speech in 1892:

A great general has said that the only good Indian is a dead one. In a sense, I agree with the sentiment, but only in this: that all the Indian there is in the race should be dead.

Pratt provided for some of the younger men to pursue more education at the Hampton Institute, a historically black college founded in 1868 for the education of freedmen by biracial representatives of the American Missionary Association soon after the Civil War. Following Pratt's sponsored students, Hampton in 1875 developed a program for Native American students.

Pratt continued the assimilation model in developing the Carlisle Indian Industrial School. Pratt felt that within one generation Native children could be integrated into Euro-American culture. With this perspective he proposed an expensive experiment to the federal government. Pratt wanted the government to fund a school that would require Native children to move away from their homes to attend a school far away. The Carlisle Indian school, which became the template for over 300 schools across the United States, opened in 1879. Carlisle Barracks, an abandoned Pennsylvanian military base, was used for the school. It became the first school that was not on a reservation.

The Carlisle curriculum was heavily based on the culture and society of rural America. The classes included vocational training for boys and domestic science for girls. Students worked to carry out chores that helped sustain the farm and food production for the self-supporting school. They were also able to produce goods to sell at the market. Carlisle students produced a newspaper, had a well-regarded chorus and orchestra, and developed sports programs. In the summer students often lived with local farm families and townspeople, reinforcing their assimilation, and providing labor at low cost to the families.

Only recently has there been any formal examination into the abuse that occurred in American Indian residential schools. In May of 2022, the Department of the Interior issued a study which found that almost 200 children's graves were discovered at Carlisle, and among them, thirteen were not marked with names but with "Unknown." Coverage of findings such as these sparked an outcry for accountability and further investigation into these institutions.

== Federally supported boarding schools ==
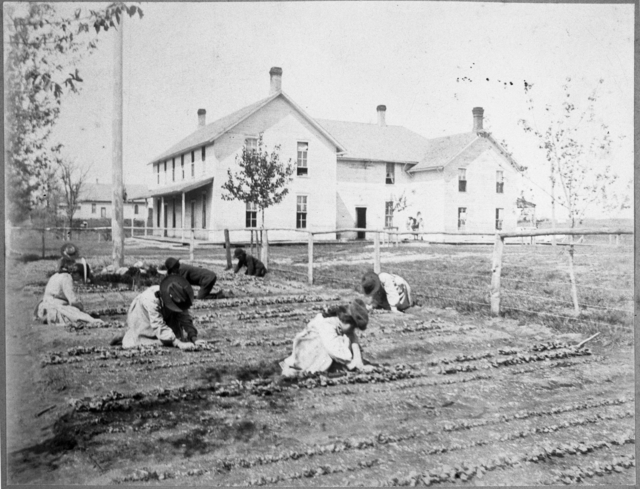
Children working in a school's garden

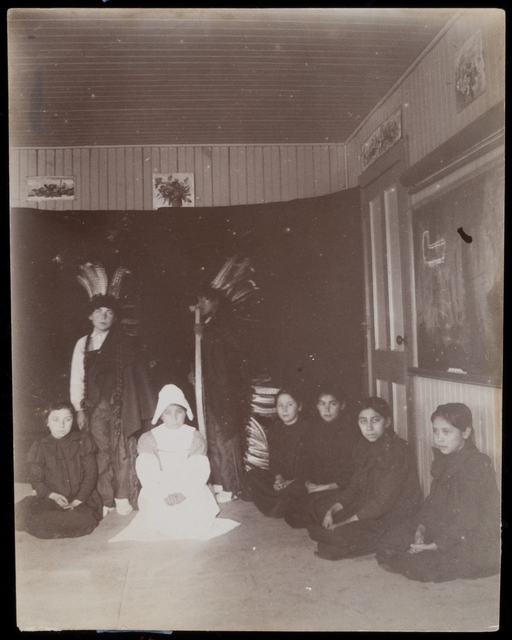
Thanksgiving Day play

Carlisle and its curriculum became the model for the Bureau of Indian Affairs. By 1902 it authorized 25 federally funded off-reservation schools in 15 states and territories, with a total enrollment of over 6,000 students. Federal legislation required Native American children to be educated according to Anglo-American standards. Parents had to authorize their children's attendance at boarding schools and, if they refused, officials could use coercion to gain a quota of students from any given reservation.

Boarding schools were also established on reservations, where they were often operated by religious missions or institutes, which were generally independent of the local diocese, in the case of Catholic orders. Because of the distances, often Native American children were separated from their families and tribes when they attended such schools on other reservations. At the peak of the federal program, the BIA supported 350 boarding schools.

In the late 19th and early 20th centuries, when students arrived at boarding schools, their lives altered dramatically. They were given short haircuts (a source of shame for boys of many tribes, who considered long hair part of their maturing identity), required to wear uniforms, and to take English names for use at the school. Sometimes the names were based on their own; other times they were assigned at random. The children were not allowed to speak their own languages, even between each other. They were required to attend church services and were often baptized as Christians. As was typical of the time, discipline was stiff in many schools. It often included assignment of extra chores for punishment, solitary confinement and corporal punishment, including beatings by teachers using sticks, rulers and belts. The treatment of these children was abusive. They suffered physical, sexual, cultural and spiritual abuse and neglect, and experienced treatment that in many cases constituted torture for speaking their Native languages.

Anna Moore said, regarding the Phoenix Indian School:

If we were not finished [scrubbing the dining room floors] when the 8 a.m. whistle sounded, the dining room matron would go around strapping us while we were still on our hands and knees.

== Abuse in the boarding schools ==
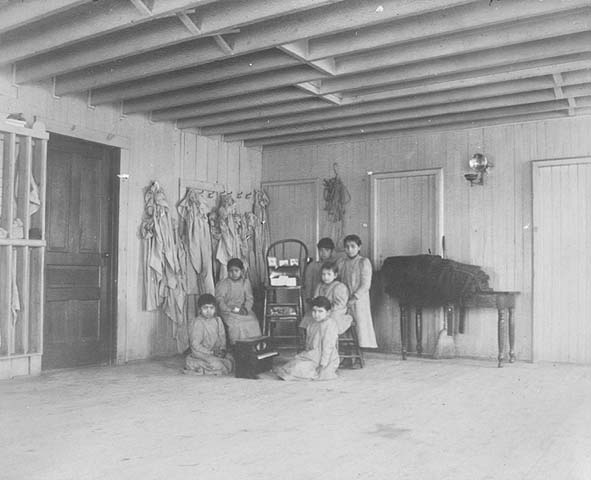
Young girls posed in room

Many children who attended boarding schools faced abuse. They were separated from their families and culture. Depending on the Christian denomination of the school, children were given European names or names from the Bible. For example, if the school was Catholic, the children were given Biblical names or names the saints. If the school did not use names then they were given a number, and were forced to remember the name when it was called out. The children were forced to speak English or Latin. They were forbidden from speaking their own native language or practice their culture. Instead they were taught about American ideas of refinement and civilization. In addition to strict language classes, they were also taught how to conduct manual labor such as farming and housekeeping or working at quarries or mills. Students were usually expected to maintain the upkeep of the school. Unclean and overpopulated living conditions led to the spread of disease, such as tuberculosis, influenza, and smallpox, and many students did not receive adequate food. Schools had their own cemeteries on the school grounds and coffins used to bury the deceased students were often built by their fellow students.

Many students ran away or committed suicide. As a result, some schools offered bounties for runaway students. Students would be severely punished if caught. Punishments included being publicly humiliated by being forced to wear a mockup Indigenous costume with makeup smeared on their face like a clown to mimic warpaint and sit in display with a sign that read: "I tried to run away." This served as reminder to students of the consequences of running away. Others were thrown in a cast iron cell called "The Box of Shame" or "The Box of Sin". According to Dr. Jon Reyhner, the methods of discipline included: "The boys were laid on an empty barrel and whipped with a long leather strap." These methods left physical injuries which children often did not recover from as wounds were often left untreated.

Many children, both boys and girls, were subjected to sexual abuse from their matrons. As recalled by one woman:

We had many different teachers during those years; some got the girls pregnant and had to leave… [One teacher] would put his arms around and fondle this girl, sometimes taking her on his lap…

One student's account explains a nun's participation in the abuse:

A nun was sponge bathing me and proceeded to go a little too far with her sponge bathing. So I pushed her hand away. She held my legs apart while she strapped the insides of my thighs. I never stopped her again.

Most often, those responsible (teachers, priests, and nuns) would receive little to no repercussions for this sexual abuse. When the children would write home to their parents about the abuse, their letters would be redacted so their families would not know the extent of the abuse.

The forced assimilation and boarding school system resulted in increased substance abuse and suicides among students who attended. Many later suffered from mental illnesses including depression and PTSD. These illnesses also increased the risk of developing cardiovascular diseases.

In October 2024, U.S. President Joe Biden issued an official apology on behalf of the federal U.S. government for the abuse suffered in these boarding schools. In an apology to a crowd of Indigenous people, Biden discussed the history of boarding schools and blamed the government for not apologizing sooner. He also stated that this kind of apology had never been issued before.

== Legality and policy ==
In 1776, the Continental Congress authorized the Indian commissioners to engage ministers as teachers to work with Indians. This movement increased after the War of 1812.

In 1819, Congress appropriated $10,000 to hire teachers and maintain schools. These resources were allocated to the missionary church schools because the government had no other mechanism to educate the Indian population.

In 1891, a compulsory attendance law enabled federal officers to forcibly take Native American children from their homes and reservations. The American government stated they were rescuing these children from a world of poverty and depression and teaching them "life skills".

Hopi men imprisoned at Alcatraz in 1895 for refusing to allow their children to go to boarding schools.

Tabatha Toney Booth of the University of Central Oklahoma wrote in her paper Cheaper Than Bullets:

Many parents had no choice but to send their kids, when Congress authorized the Commissioner of Indian Affairs to withhold rations, clothing, and annuities of those families that refused to send students. Some agents even used reservation police to virtually kidnap youngsters, but experienced difficulties when the Native police officers would resign out of disgust, or when parents taught their kids a special "hide and seek" game. Sometimes resistant fathers found themselves locked up for refusal. In 1895, nineteen men of the Hopi Nation were imprisoned to Alcatraz because they refused to send their children to boarding school.

Between 1778 and 1871, the federal government signed 389 treaties with American Indian tribes. Most of these treaties contained provisions that the federal government would provide education and other services in exchange for land. The last of these treaties, the Fort Laramie Treaty of 1868, established the Great Sioux Reservation. One particular article in the Fort Laramie Treaty illustrates the attention the federal government paid to the "civilizing" nature of education: "Article 7. In order to insure the civilization of the Indians entering in this treaty the necessity of education is admitted, especially of such of them as are or may be settled on said agricultural reservations, and they therefore pledge themselves to compel their children, male and female, between the ages of six and sixteen years to attend school"

Use of the English language in the education of American Indian children was first mentioned in the report of the Indian Peace Commission, a body appointed by an act of Congress in 1867. The report stated that the difference of languages was a major problem and advocated elimination of Indian languages and replacement of them with English. This report created a controversy in Indian education because the missionaries who had been responsible for educating Native youth used a bilingual instructional policy. In 1870, President Grant criticized this, beginning a new policy with eradication of Native languages as a major goal.

In 1871, the United States government prohibited further treaties with Indian nations and also passed the Appropriations Act for Indian Education requiring the establishment of day schools on reservations.

In 1873, the Board of Indian Commissioners argued in a report to Congress that days schools were ineffective at teaching Indian children English because they spent 20 hours per day at home speaking their native language. The Senate and House Indian Affairs committees joined in the criticism of day schools a year later arguing that they operated too much to perpetuate "the Indian as special-status individual rather than preparing for him independent citizenship"

"The boarding school movement began after the Civil War, when reformers turned their attention to the plight of Indian people and advocated for proper education and treatment so that Indians could become like other citizens. One of the first efforts to accomplish this goal was the establishment of the Carlisle Indian School in Pennsylvania, founded in 1879." The leader of the school, General Pratt also employed the "outing system" which placed Indians in non-Indian homes during the summers and for three years following high school to learn non-Indian culture (ibid). Government subsidies were made to participating families. Pratt believed that this was both educating American Indians and making them Americans. In 1900, 1,880 Carlisle students participated in this system, each with his or her own bank account.

In the late 1800s, the federal government pursued a policy of total assimilation of the American Indian into mainstream American society.

In 1918, Carlisle boarding school was closed because Pratt's method of assimilating American Indian students through off-reservation boarding schools was perceived as outdated. That same year Congress passed new Indian education legislation, the Act of May 25, 1918. It generally forbade expenditures for separate education of children less than 1/4 Indian whose parents are citizens of the United States when they live in an area where adequate free public schools are provided.

=== Meriam Report of 1928 ===
In 1926, the Department of the Interior (DOI) commissioned the Brookings Institution to conduct a survey of the overall conditions of American Indians and to assess federal programs and policies. The Meriam Report, officially titled The Problem of Indian Administration, was submitted February 21, 1928, to Secretary of the Interior Hubert Work. Related to education of Native American children, it recommended that the government:

- Abolish The Uniform Course of Study, which taught only European-American cultural values;
- Educate younger children at community schools near home, and have older children attend non-reservation schools for higher grade work;
- Have the Indian Service (now Bureau of Indian Affairs) provide American Indians the education and skills they need to adapt both in their own communities and United States society.

=== The Indian Reorganization Act of 1934 ===
The Indian Reorganization Act of 1934 ended the allotment period of history, confirmed the rights to Indian self-government, and made Indians eligible to hold Bureau of Indian Affairs posts, which encouraged Indians to attend vocational schools and colleges." During this period there was an effort to encourage the development of community day schools; however, public school attendance for Indian children was also encouraged. In the same year, the Johnson–O'Malley Act (JOM) was passed, which provided for the reimbursement of states for the cost of educating Indian students in public schools. This federal-state contract provided that a specified sum be paid by the federal government and held the state responsible for the education and welfare of Indians within its boundaries. Funds made available from the O'Malley act were designated to assist in reducing the enrollment of Indian boarding schools, placing them in public schools instead.

=== The termination period ===
In 1953, Congress passed House Concurrent Resolution 108, which set a new direction in federal policy toward Indians. The major spokesperson for the resolution Senator Arthur Watkins (Utah), stated: "As rapidly as possible, we should end the status of Indians as wards of the government and grant them all the rights and prerogatives pertaining to American citizenship" The federal government implemented another new policy, aimed at relocating Indian people to urban cities and away from the reservations, terminating the tribes as separate entities. There were sixty-one tribes terminated during that period.

=== 1968 onward ===
In 1968, President Lyndon B. Johnson ended this practice and the termination period. He also directed the Secretary of the Interior to establish Indian school boards for federal Indian schools comprising members of the communities.

Major legislation aimed at improving Indian education occurred in the 1970s. In 1972, Congress passed the Indian Education Act, which established a comprehensive approach to meeting the unique needs of American Indians and Alaska Native students. This Act recognizes that American Indians have unique educational and culturally related academic needs and distinct language and cultural needs. The most far-reaching legislation to be signed during the 1970s, however, was the Indian Self-Determination and Education Assistance Act of 1975, which guaranteed tribes the opportunity to determine their own futures and the education of their children through funds allocated to and administrated by individual tribes.

== Disease and death ==
Given the lack of public sanitation and the often crowded conditions at boarding schools in the early 20th century, students were at risk for infectious diseases such as tuberculosis, measles, and trachoma. None of these diseases were yet treatable by antibiotics or controlled by vaccines, and epidemics swept schools as they did cities.

The overcrowding of the schools contributed to the rapid spread of disease within the schools. "An often-underpaid staff provided irregular medical care. And not least, apathetic boarding school officials frequently failed to heed their own directions calling for the segregation of children in poor health from the rest of the student body". Tuberculosis was especially deadly among students. Many children died while in custody at Indian schools. Often students were prevented from communicating with their families, and parents were not notified when their children fell ill; the schools also failed sometimes to notify them when a child died. "Many of the Indian deaths during the great influenza pandemic of 1918–1919, which hit the Native American population hard, took place in boarding schools."

The 1928 Meriam Report noted that infectious disease was often widespread at the schools due to malnutrition, overcrowding, poor sanitary conditions, and students weakened by overwork. The report said that death rates for Native American students were six and a half times higher than for other ethnic groups. A report regarding the Phoenix Indian School said, "In December of 1899, measles broke out at the Phoenix Indian School, reaching epidemic proportions by January. In its wake, 325 cases of measles, 60 cases of pneumonia, and 9 deaths were recorded in a 10-day period."

== Implications of assimilation ==
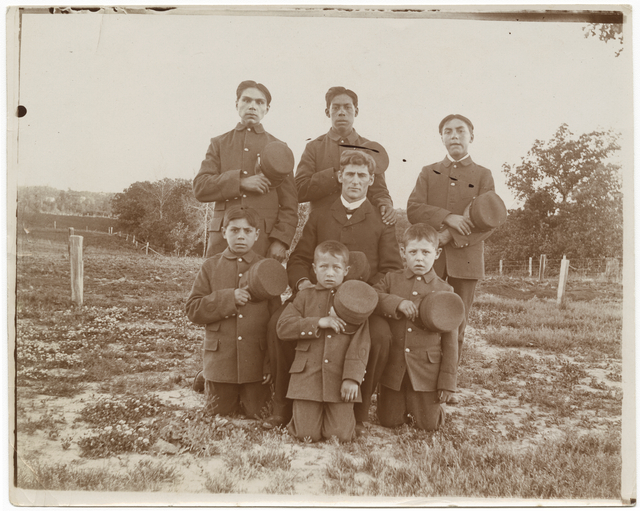
Teacher and young boys posed for photograph

From 1810 to 1917, the U.S. federal government subsidized mission and boarding schools. By 1885, 106 Indian schools had been established, many of them on abandoned military installations. Using military personnel and Indian prisoners, boarding schools were seen as a means for the government to achieve assimilation of Native Americans into mainstream American culture. Assimilation efforts included forcibly removing Native Americans from their families, converting them to Christianity, preventing them from learning or practicing indigenous culture and customs, and living in a strict military fashion.

When students arrived at boarding schools, the routine was typically the same. First, the students were forced to give up their tribal clothing and their hair was cut. Second, "[t]o instill the necessary discipline, the entire school routine was organized in martial fashion, and every facet of student life followed a strict timetable".

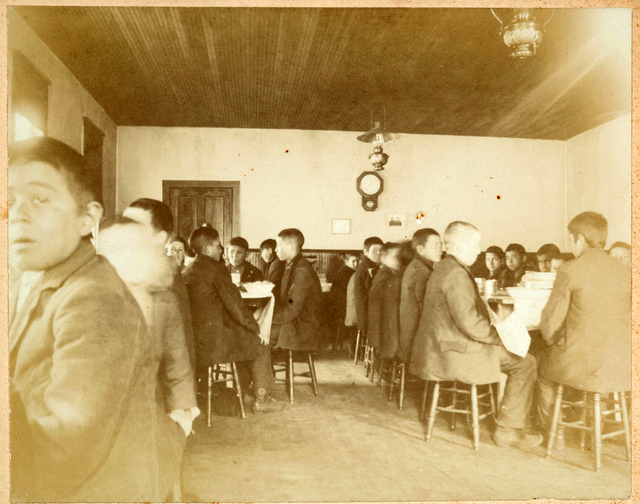
Young boys eating in the dining hall

One student recalled the routine in the 1890s:

A small bell was tapped, and each of the pupils drew a chair from under the table. Supposing this act meant that they were to be seated, I pulled out mine and at once slipped into it from one side. But when I turned my head, I saw that I was the only one seated, and all the rest at our table remained standing. Just as I began to rise, looking shyly around to see how chairs were to be used, a second bell was sounded. All were seated at last, and I had to crawl back into my chair again. I heard a man's voice at one end of the hall, and I looked around to see him. But all the others hung their heads over their plates. As I glanced at the long chain of tables, I cause the eyes of a paleface woman upon me. Immediately I dropped my eyes, wondering why I was so keenly watched by the strange woman. The man ceased his mutterings, and then a third bell was tapped. Everyone picked up his knife and fork and began eating. I began crying instead, for by this time I was afraid to venture anything more.

Besides mealtime routines, administrators educated Indigenous students on how to farm using European-based methods, which they considered superior to indigenous methods. Given the constraints of rural locations and limited budgets, boarding schools often operated supporting farms, raising livestock and produced their vegetables and fruit.

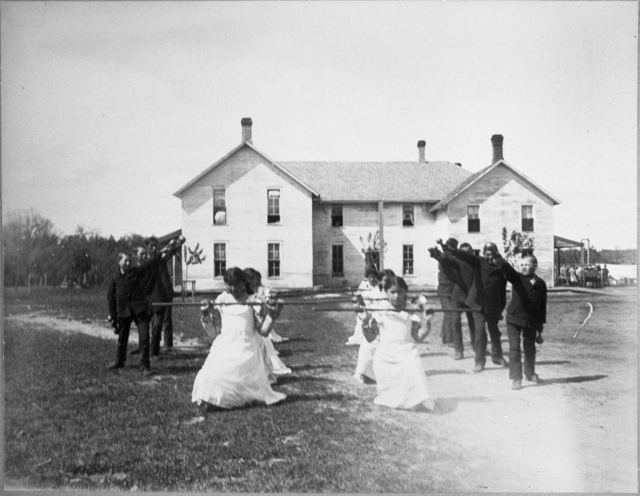
Children doing calisthenics

From the moment students arrived at school, they could not "be Indian" in any way. Boarding school administrators "forbade, whether in school or on reservation, tribal singing and dancing, along with the wearing of ceremonial and 'savage' clothes, the practice of native religions, the speaking of tribal languages, the acting out of traditional gender roles". School administrators argued that young women needed to be specifically targeted due to their important place in continuing assimilation education in their future homes. Educational administrators and teachers were instructed that "Indian girls were to be assured that, because their grandmothers did things in a certain way, there was no reason for them to do the same".

Removal to reservations in the West in the early part of the century and the enactment of the Dawes Act in 1887 eventually took nearly 50 million acres of land from Indian control. On-reservation schools were either taken over by Anglo leadership or destroyed. Indian-controlled school systems became non-existent while "the Indians [were] made captives of federal or mission education".

Although schools did use verbal correction to enforce assimilation, more violent measures were also used, as corporal punishment was common in European American society. Archuleta et al. (2000) noted cases where students had "their mouths washed out with lye soap when they spoke their native languages; they could be locked up in the guardhouse with only bread and water for other rule violations; and they faced corporal punishment and other rigid discipline on a daily basis".

Beyond physical and mental abuse, some school authorities sexually abused students as well. One former student recounted,

Intimidation and fear were very much present in our daily lives. For instance, we would cower from the abusive disciplinary practices of some superiors, such as the one who yanked my cousin's ear hard enough to tear it. After a nine-year-old girl was raped in her dormitory bed during the night, we girls would be so scared that we would jump into each other's bed as soon as the lights went out. The sustained terror in our hearts further tested our endurance, as it was better to suffer with a full bladder and be safe than to walk through the dark, seemingly endless hallway to the bathroom. When we were older, we girls anguished each time we entered the classroom of a certain male teacher who stalked and molested girls.

Girls and young women taken from their families and placed into boarding schools, such as the Hampton Normal and Agricultural Institute, were urged to accomplish the U.S. federal government's vision of "educating Indian girls in the hope that women trained as good housewives would help their mates assimilate" into U.S. mainstream culture.

Historian Brenda Child asserts that boarding schools cultivated pan-Indianism and made possible cross-tribal coalitions that helped many different tribes collaborate in the later 20th century. She argues:

People formerly separated by language, culture, and geography lived and worked together in residential schools. Students formed close bonds and enjoyed a rich cross-cultural change. Graduates of government schools often married former classmates, found employment in the Indian Service, migrated to urban areas, returned to their reservations and entered tribal politics. Countless new alliances, both personal and political, were forged in government boarding schools.

It is important to clarify that the schools themselves did not serve as the place where revolutionary movements among Native Americans was born, but rather served as a means for people across tribes to unite against an invading power. According to an interview with a former attendee, his experience helped him with regard to "...getting along with different kinds of people, since we come from different tribes." This is an important distinction to make, since emphasizing how these schools served to erase Native culture rather than assimilating it into one culture or combining it with that of the settlers directly connects to how the emergence of Pan-Indianism came as a response to widespread opression of Native Americans.

Jacqueline Emery, introducing an anthology of boarding school writings, suggests that these writings prove that the children showed a cultural and personal resilience "more common among boarding school students than one might think". Although school authorities censored the material, it demonstrates multiple methods of resistance to school regimes. Several students educated in boarding schools, such as Gertrude Bonnin, Angel De Cora, Francis La Flesche, and Laura Cornelius Kellogg, became highly educated and were precursors to modern Indigenous activists.

After release or graduation from Indian boarding schools, students were expected to return to their tribes and induce European assimilation there. Many students who returned to their reservations experienced alienation, language, and cultural barriers, and confusion, in addition to post-traumatic stress disorder and the legacy of trauma from abuse. They struggled to respect elders, but also met resistance from family and friends when trying to initiate Anglo-American changes.

Students at boarding schools faced hardship, but that did not stop them from building a foundation of resistance. Native students utilized what was taught at school to speak up and perform activism. They were very intelligent and resourceful, becoming knowledgeable in activism and political work. Forcibly removed from their families, many later refused to allow their children to be forcefully taken from them by hiding them and encouraging them to run away. It was not always successful but it was a form of resistance that was present during this period.

As mentioned by historians Brian Klopotek and Brenda Child, "A remote Indian population living in Northern Minnesota who, in 1900, took a radical position against the construction of a government school." This Indigenous population, the Ojibwe people, showed hostility to construction on their land through armed resistance. The Ojibwe men stood as armed guards surrounding the construction workers and their building, indicating the workmen were not welcome to build on their land. This type of armed resistance was common throughout Native society during the boarding school period.

A famous resistance tactic used by students in boarding schools was speaking and responding back in their mother tongue. The schools stressed the importance of enforcing the extinction of their first language and adapting to English. Speaking their language symbolized a bond that strictly attached them closer still to their culture, though it resulted in physical abuse which was feared; resistance continued in this form in order to cause frustration. They wanted to show their language and culture were deeply rooted in them and that they could not be replaced with force. Another form of resistance used was misbehavior, acting very foolishly and making it hard for them to be handled. Misbehaving meant consistently breaking the rules, acting out of character, and starting fires or fights. This was all an act in hopes of being sent home. The students wanted to be difficult enough to not suffer abuse but to be expelled. Resistance was a form of courage used to go against the boarding schools. These efforts were inspired by each other and from times of colonization. It was a way to keep their mother tongue, culture, and Native identities still attached and restored to civilization. Resistance tactics helped slow down the intelligence of American culture being understood and taught.

The ongoing effects of forced boarding schools on Indigenous communities was hardly forgivable by the various groups. According to Mary Annette Pember, whose mother was forced to attend St. Mary's Catholic Boarding school in Wisconsin, her mother often recollected "the beatings, the shaming, and the withholding of food" done by the nuns. The same effects continue on for generations of Native people who never attended the schools themselves, such as on families with surviving and missing loved ones.

When faculty visited former students, they rated their success based on the following criteria: "orderly households, 'citizen's dress', Christian weddings, 'well-kept' babies, land in severalty, children in school, industrious work habits, and leadership roles in promoting the same 'civilized' lifestyles among family and tribe". Many students returned to the boarding schools. General Richard Henry Pratt, an administrator who had founded the Carlisle Indian Industrial School, began to believe that "[t]o civilize the Indian, get him into civilization. To keep him civilized, let him stay."

== Schools in mid-20th century and later reforms ==
Attendance in Indian boarding schools generally increased throughout the first half of the 20th century, doubling by the 1960s. In 1969, the BIA operated 226 schools in 17 states, including on reservations and in remote geographical areas. Some 77 were boarding schools. A total of 34,605 children were enrolled in the boarding schools; 15,450 in BIA day schools; and 3,854 were housed in dormitories "while attending public schools with BIA financial support. In addition, 62,676 Indian youngsters attend public schools supported by the Johnson-O'Malley Act, which is administered by BIA."

Enrollment reached its highest point in the 1970s. In 1973, 60,000 American Indian children are estimated to have been enrolled in an Indian boarding school.

The rise of pan-Indian activism, tribal nations' continuing complaints about the schools, and studies in the late 1960s and mid-1970s (such as the Kennedy Report of 1969 and the National Study of American Indian Education) led to passage of the Indian Self-Determination and Education Assistance Act of 1975. This emphasized authorizing tribes to contract with federal agencies in order to take over management of programs such as education. It also enabled the tribes to establish community schools for their children on their reservations.

In 1978, Congress passed and President Jimmy Carter signed the Indian Child Welfare Act, giving American Indian parents the legal right to refuse their child's placement in a school. Damning evidence related to years of abuses of students in off-reservation boarding schools contributed to the enactment of the Indian Child Welfare Act. Congress approved this act after hearing testimony about life in Indian boarding schools.

As a result of these changes, many large Indian boarding schools closed in the 1980s and early 1990s. Some located on reservations were taken over by tribes. By 2007, the number of American Indian children living in Indian boarding school dormitories had declined to 9,500. This figure includes those in 45 on-reservation boarding schools, seven off-reservation boarding schools, and 14 peripheral dormitories. From 1879 to the present day, it is estimated that hundreds of thousands of Native Americans attended Indian boarding schools as children.

As of 2023, four federally run off-reservation boarding schools still exist.

American Indian tribes developed one of their first women's colleges.

== 21st century ==
Circa 2020, the Bureau of Indian Education operates approximately 183 schools, primarily non-boarding, and primarily located on reservations. The schools have 46,000 students. Modern criticisms focus on the quality of education provided and compliance with federal education standards. In March 2020 the BIA finalized a rule to create the Standards, Assessments and Accountability System (SAAS) for all BIA schools. The motivation behind the rule is to prepare BIA students to be ready for college and careers.

President Joe Biden designated the Carlisle Indian Industrial School as a national monument in December 2024.

== In popular culture ==
=== Music ===
- "Reservation of Education," a 1973 rock song by Native American rock band XIT

=== Film and television ===
- 1923, television series in which one of the main storylines depicts a Native American boarding school run by the Catholic Church.
- Indian Horse, based on the book with the same name written by Richard Wagamese (Ojibwe), produced by Devonshire Productions and Screen Siren Pictures (2017)
- The Only Good Indian, 2009 film starring Wes Studi
- Our Fires Still Burn, documentary produced by Audrey Geyer (2013)
- Our Spirits Don't Speak English: Indian Boarding School, documentary produced by Rich-Heape Films (2008)
- Playing for the World, documentary produced by Montana PBS (2010)
- Reservation Dogs, season 3, episode 3, "Deer Lady" (2023)
- Unspoken: America's Native American Boarding Schools, documentary produced by KUED (2016)

=== Other ===
- At the 1893 Columbian Exposition in Chicago, the Bureau of Indian Affairs showcased indigenous children demonstrating “civilized" skills for audiences.
- Stolen: Surviving St. Michael's, podcast (2022)

== List of American Indian boarding schools ==
List of American Indian boarding schools by present-day state or territory, and in alphabetical order.

=== Alabama ===
- Asbury Manual Labor School, near Fort Mitchell, Alabama, open 1822–30 run by the United Methodist Missions.

=== Alaska ===
- Jesse Lee Home for Children, Originally in Unalaska, Alaska, moved to Seward, Alaska and later Anchorage, Alaska. Founded and run by Methodist Church
- Mount Edgecumbe High School, Sitka, Alaska, established as a BIA school, now operated by the State of Alaska
- Sheldon Jackson College, Presbyterian-run high school, then college, in Sitka, Alaska
- Wrangell Institute, Presbyterian church-led initiative, run by the BIA in Wrangell, Alaska

=== Arizona ===
- Chinle Boarding School, at Chinle, Arizona (1910–1976); then relocated to Many Farms, Arizona; converted to Navajo operated school that year
- Holbrook Indian School, Holbrook, Arizona
- Many Farms High School, near Many Farms, Arizona
- Phoenix Indian School, Phoenix, Arizona
- Pinon Boarding School, Pinon, Arizona
- Theodore Roosevelt Indian Boarding School, founded in 1923 in buildings of the U.S. Army's closed Fort Apache, Arizona, as of 2016 operating as a Navajo tribal school
- Truxton Boarding School near the Haulapai Reservation, a national historic site.

=== California ===
- Fort Bidwell School, Fort Bidwell, California
- Greenville School, California
- St. Boniface Indian School, Banning, California
- Sherman Indian High School, in Riverside, California since 1903

=== Colorado ===
- Ignacio Boarding School, Colorado
- Teller Institute, Grand Junction, Colorado
- Fort Lewis, Hesperus, Colorado

=== Connecticut ===
- Eleazar Wheelock and Moor's Indian Charity School, Lebanon, Connecticut open from 1754 to 1768
- Foreign Miaaion School, Cornwall, Connecticut, open 1817-1826
- Mary Immaculate School, De Smet, Idaho, open from 1878 to 1974
- St. Joesph's Mission School, Slickpoo, Idaho open from 1874 to 1968
- Fort Lapwai Training School; Fort Lapwai Sanitorium and Hospital; Fort Lapwai Industrial School; Fort Lapwai, Idaho, open from 1885 to 1909
- Nez Perce Boarding School, Lapwai, Idaho, open from 1868 to 1893
- Lemhi Boarding School, Lemhi, Idaho open from 1885 to 1907
- Fort Hall Boarding School, Fort Hall, Idaho open from 1874 to 1936

=== Indiana ===
- White's Manual Labor Institute, Wabash, Indiana. Open 1870–1895 and operated by Quakers
- Saint Joseph's College (Indiana) was founded in 1889 by Father Joseph A. Stephan as a secondary school to educate Native Americans.

=== Indian Territory ===
- Arapaho Manual Labor and Boarding School, Darlington, Indian Territory, (Cheyenne and Arapaho Indian Reservation), opened in 1872 and paid for by federal funds, but run by the Hicksite (Liberal) Friends and Orthodox Quakers. Moved to Concho Indian Boarding School in 1909. * Cheyenne-Arapaho Boarding School, Darlington, Indian Territory, opened 1871 became the Arapaho Manual Labor and Boarding School in 1879
- Armstrong Academy, near Chahta Tamaha, Choctaw Nation, Indian Territory
- Cheyenne Manual Labor and Boarding School, Caddo Springs, Indian Territory, opened 1879 and paid with by federal funds, but run by the Hicksite (Liberal) Friends and Orthodox Quakers. Moved to Concho Indian Boarding School in 1909.
- Chuala Female Seminary (also known as the Pine Ridge Mission School), near Doaksville, Choctaw Nation, Indian Territory, open 1838–61 by the Presbyterian Church
- Darlington Mission School, Darlington, Indian Territory, Cheyenne and Arapaho Indian Reservation, run by the General Conference Mennonites from 1881 to 1902
- Fort Sill Indian School (originally known as Josiah Missionary School), near Fort Sill, Indian Territory, opened in 1871 by the Quakers. Operated until 1980.
- Pine Ridge Mission School, near Doaksville, Choctaw Nation, Indian Territory; see Chuala Female Seminary
- Quapaw Industrial Boarding School, Quapaw Agency, Indian Territory, open 1872–1900
- Spencer Academy (sometimes referred to as the National School of the Choctaw Nation), near Doaksville, Choctaw Nation, Indian Territory, operating 1842–1900
- Wealaka Mission School Wealaka, Indian Territory, open 1882–1907

=== Iowa ===
- White's Manual Labor Institute, West Branch, Iowa, open 1881–87

=== Kansas ===
- Haskell Indian Industrial Training School, Lawrence, Kansas, 1884–present
- Shawnee Indian Mission, Fairway, Kansas, open 1839-1862

=== Kentucky ===
- Choctaw Academy, Blue Spring, Scott County, Kentucky, opened 1825

=== Michigan ===
- Mount Pleasant Indian Industrial Boarding School, Mount Pleasant, Michigan, 1893–1934

=== Minnesota ===
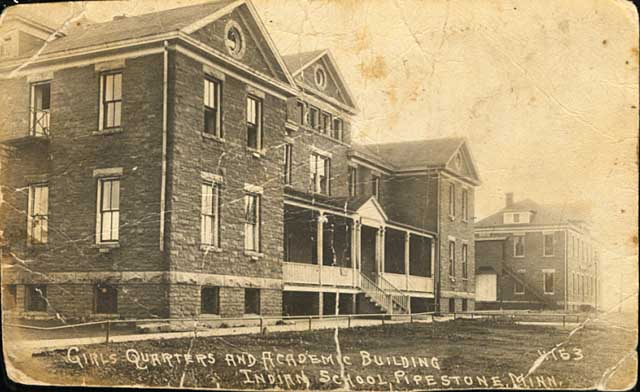
Girls quarters and academic building, Pipestone Indian School

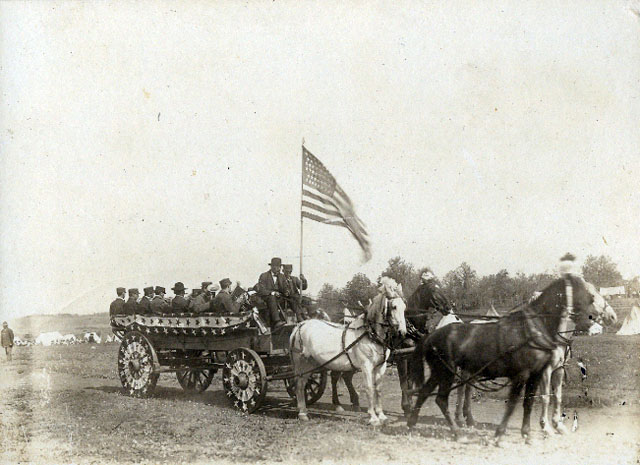
White Earth Boarding School band

- Morris Industrial School for Indians, Morris, Minnesota, open 1887–1909
- Pipestone Indian School, Pipestone, Minnesota
- Covenant of our Lady of the Lake
- Cross Lake
- St. Benedict's Industrial School
- Pine Point
- Red Lake
- Cass/Leech Lake
- Clontarf (St. Paul's Industrial School)
- St. Mary's Mission
- St. John's Industrial School
- St. Theodore's
- Vermillion Lake Indian School
- White Earth Boarding School
- Wild Rice River

=== Montana ===
- Fort Shaw Indian School, Fort Shaw, Montana

=== Nebraska ===
- Genoa Indian Industrial School, Genoa, Nebraska

=== Nevada ===
- Stewart Indian School, Carson City, Nevada

=== New Mexico ===
- Albuquerque Indian School, Albuquerque, New Mexico
- Menaul School, originally known as the Pueblo Training School but closed due to competition from the Albuquerque Indian School. The Presbyterian Church later reopened and renamed the school to serve Hispanos of New Mexico of Indigenous descent. At first Menaul only admitted "Spanish-American boys" but later took girls as well.
- Nenannezed Boarding School, New Mexico
- Rehoboth Mission School located in Rehoboth, New Mexico, near the Navajo Nation. Operated as an Indian Boarding School by the Christian Reformed Church in North America from 1903 to 2007. The school currently operates as a day school only.History - Rehoboth Christian School
- San Juan Boarding School, New Mexico
- Santa Fe Indian School, Santa Fe, New Mexico
- Shiprock Boarding School, Shiprock, New Mexico
- Southwestern Indian Polytechnic Institute, near Albuquerque, New Mexico

=== New York ===
- Thomas Indian School, near Irving, New York

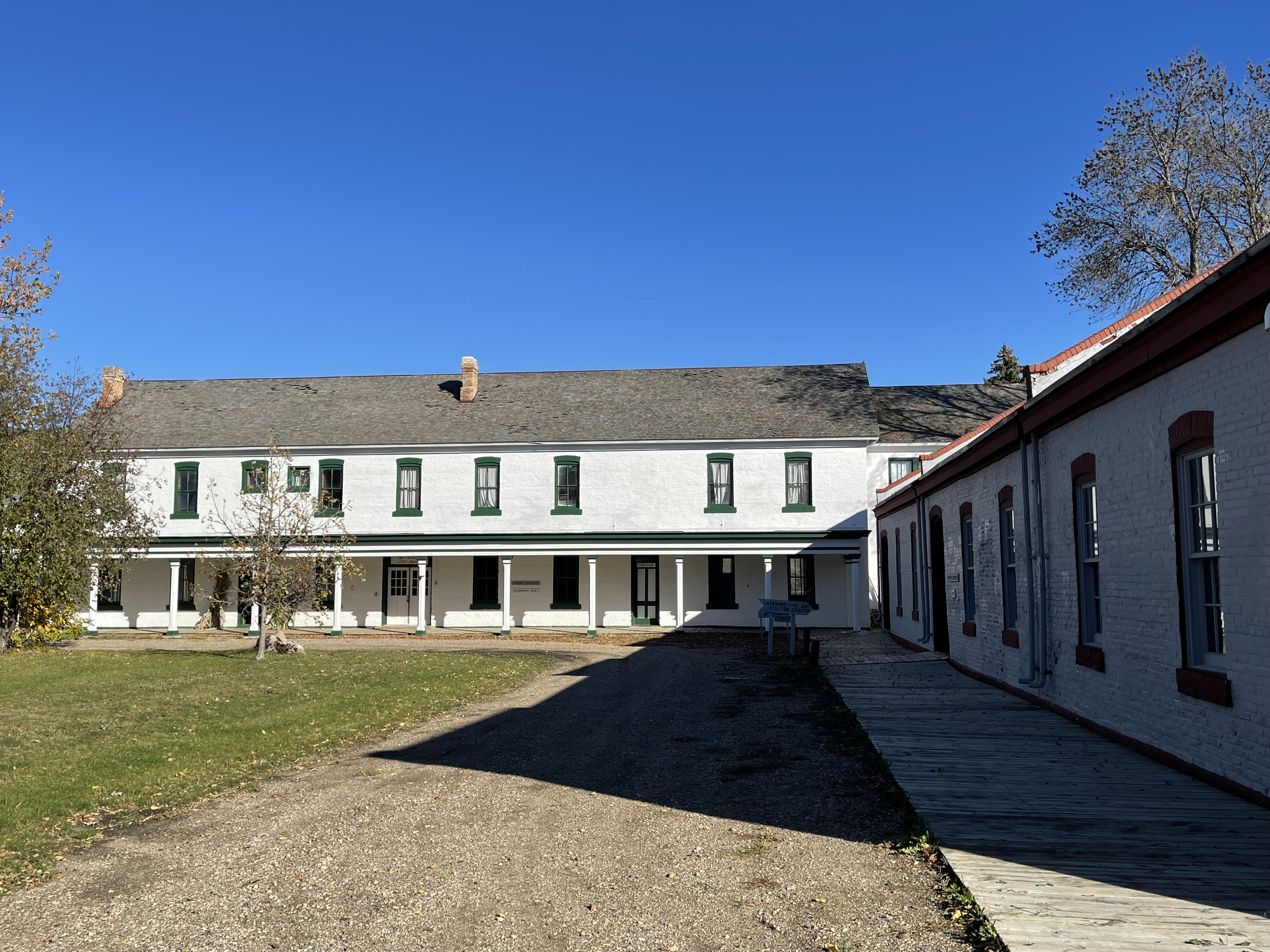
Fort Totten Indian Industrial School, Ft. Totten, North Dakota

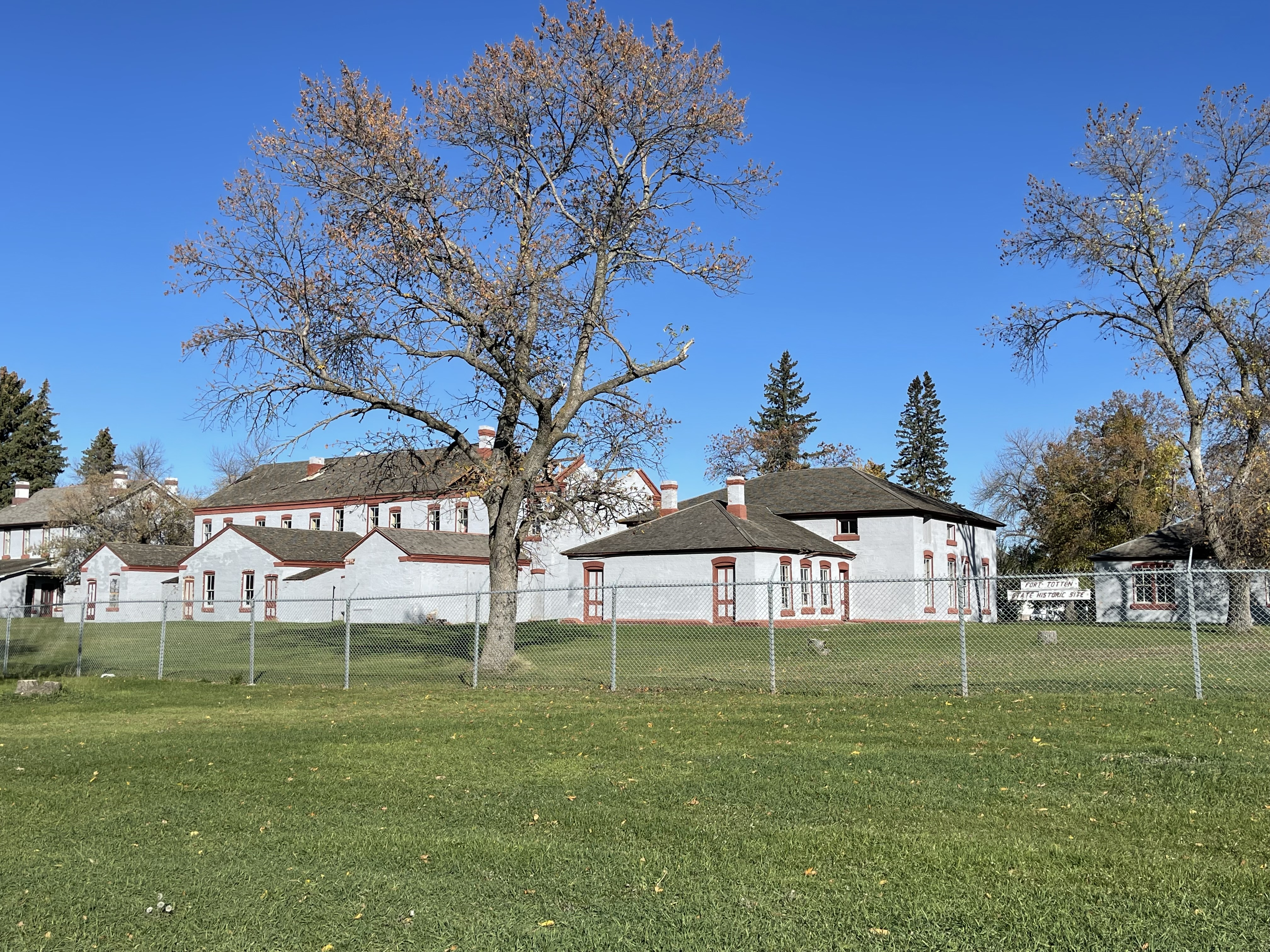
Fort Totten Indian Industrial School, Ft. Totten, North Dakota

=== North Dakota ===
- Circle of Nations Indian School, Wahpeton, North Dakota
- Fort Totten Indian Industrial School, Fort Totten, North Dakota. Boarding and Indian Industrial School in 1891–1935. Became a Community and Day School from 1940 to 1959. Now a Historic Site run by the State Historic Society of North Dakota.
- Wahpeton Indian School, Wahpeton, North Dakota, 1904–93. In 1993 its name was changed to Circle of Nations School and came under tribal control. Currently open.

=== Oklahoma ===
- Absentee Shawnee Boarding School, near Shawnee, Indian Territory, open 1893–1899
- Anadarko Boarding School, Anadarko, Oklahoma, open 1911–1933
- Asbury Manual Labor School, near Eufaula, Creek Nation, Indian Territory, open 1850–1888 by the United Methodist Missions.
- Bacone College, Muscogee, Oklahoma, 1881–present
- Bloomfield Female Academy, originally near Achille, Chickasaw Nation, Indian Territory. Opened in 1848 but relocated to Ardmore, Oklahoma, around 1917 and in 1934 was renamed Carter Seminary.
- Bond's Mission School or Montana Industrial School for Indians, run by Unitarians, Crow Indian Reservation, near Custer Station, Montana, 1886–1897
- Burney Institute, near Lebanon, Chickasaw Nation, Indian Territory, open 1854–1887 when name changed to Chickasaw Orphan Home and Manual Labor School and operated by the Cumberland Presbyterian Church.
- Cameron Institute, Cameron, Choctaw Nation, Indian Territory, open 1893–early 20th century, was operated by the Presbyterian Church
- Cantonment Indian Boarding School, Canton, Indian Territory, run by the General Conference Mennonites from September, 1882 to 1 July 1927
- Carter Seminary, Ardmore, Oklahoma, 1917–2004 when the facility moved to Kingston, Oklahoma, and was renamed the Chickasaw Children's Village.
- Cherokee Female Seminary, Tahlequah, Cherokee Nation, Indian Territory, open 1851–1910
- Cherokee Male Seminary, Tahlequah, Cherokee Nation, Indian Territory, open 1851–1910
- Cherokee Orphan Asylum, Tahlequah, Cherokee Nation, Indian Territory, opened in 1871
- Chickasaw (male) Academy, near Tishomingo, Chickasaw Nation, Oklahoma. Opened in 1850 by the Methodist Episcopal Church and changed its name to Harley Institute around 1889.
- Chickasaw Children's Village, on Lake Texoma near Kingston, Oklahoma, opened 2004
- Chickasaw National Academy, near Stonewall, Chickasaw Nation, Indian Territory. Open about 1865 to 1880
- Chickasaw Orphan Home and Manual Labor School (formerly Burney Academy) near Lebanon, Chickasaw Nation, Indian Territory, open 1887–1906
- Chilocco Indian Agricultural School, Chilocco, Oklahoma, open 1884–1980
- Colbert Institute, Perryville, Choctaw Nation, Indian Territory, open 1852–1857 by the Methodist Episcopal Church, South
- Collins Institute, near Stonewall, Chickasaw Nation, Indian Territory. Open about 1885 to 1905
- Concho Indian Boarding School, Concho, Oklahoma, open 1909–1983
- Creek Orphan Asylum, Okmulgee, Creek Nation, Indian Territory, opened 1895
- Dwight Mission, Marble City, Oklahoma
- Elliott Academy (formerly Oak Hill Industrial Academy), near Valliant, Oklahoma, 1912–1936
- El Meta Bond College, Minco, Chickasaw Nation, Indian Territory, open 1890–1919
- Emahaka Mission, Wewoka, Seminole Nation, Indian Territory, open 1894–1911
- Euchee Boarding School, Sapulpa, Creek Nation, Indian Territory, open 1894–1947
- Eufaula Dormitory, Eufaula, Oklahoma, name changed from Eufaula High School in 1952. Still in operation
- Eufaula Indian High School, Eufaula, Creek Nation, Indian Territory, replaced the burned Asbury Manual Labor School. Open in 1892–1952, when the name changed to Eufaula Dormitory
- Folsom Training School, near Smithville, Oklahoma, open 1921–1932, when it became an all-white school
- Fort Coffee Academy, Fort Coffee, Choctaw Nation, Indian Territory. Open 1840–1863 and run by the Methodist Episcopal Church, South
- Goodland Academy & Indian Orphanage, Hugo, Oklahoma
- Harley Institute, near Tishomingo, Chickasaw Nation, Oklahoma. Prior to 1889 was known as the Chickasaw Academy and was operated by the Methodist Episcopal Church until 1906.
- Hillside Mission School, near Skiatook, Cherokee Nation, Indian Territory, open 1884–1908 by the Quakers
- Iowa Mission School, near Fallis, Iowa Reservation, Indian Territory, open 1890–1893 by the Quakers
- Jones Academy, Hartshorne, Choctaw Nation, Indian Territory/Oklahoma. Opened in 1891
- Koweta Mission School Coweta, Creek Nation, Indian Territory, open 1843–1861
- Levering Manual Labor School, Wetumka, Creek Nation, Indian Territory. Open 1882–91, operated by the Southern Baptist Convention.
- Mekasukey Academy, near Seminole, Seminole Nation, Indian Territory, open 1891–1930
- Murray State School of Agriculture, Tishomingo, Oklahoma, est. 1908
- New Hope Academy, Fort Coffee, Choctaw Nation, Indian Territory. Open 1844–1896 and run by the Methodist Episcopal Church, South
- Nuyaka School and Orphanage (Nuyaka Mission, Presbyterian), Okmulgee, Creek Nation, Indian Territory, 1884–1933
- Oak Hill Industrial Academy, near Valliant, Choctaw Nation, Indian Territory. Open 1878–1912 by the Presbyterian Mission Board. The Choctaw freedmen's academy was renamed as the Elliott Academy (aka Alice Lee Elliott Memorial Academy) in 1912.
- Oak Ridge Manual Labor School, near Holdenville, Indian Territory, in the Seminole Nation. Open 1848–1860s by the Presbyterian Mission Board.
- Oklahoma Presbyterian College for Girls, Durant, Oklahoma
- Oklahoma School for the Blind, Muskogee, Oklahoma
- Oklahoma School for the Deaf, Sulphur, Oklahoma
- Osage Boarding School, Pawhuska, Osage Nation, Indian Territory, open 1874–1922
- Park Hill Mission School, Park Hill, Indian Territory/Oklahoma, opened 1837
- Pawnee Boarding School, Pawnee, Indian Territory, open 1878–1958
- Rainy Mountain Boarding School, near Gotebo, Kiowa-Comanche-Apache Reservation, Indian Territory, open 1893–1920
- Red Moon School, near Hammon, Indian Territory, open 1897–1922
- Riverside Indian School, Anadarko, Oklahoma, open 1871–present
- Sac and Fox Boarding School, near Stroud, Indiant Territory, open 1872–1919 by the Quakers
- Sacred Heart College, near Asher, Potowatamie Nation, Indian Territory, open 1884–1902
- Sacred Heart Institute, near Asher, Potowatamie Nation, Indian Territory, open 1880–1929
- St. Agnes Academy, Ardmore, Oklahoma
- St. Agnes Mission, Antlers, Oklahoma
- St. Elizabeth's Boarding School, Purcell, Oklahoma
- St. John's Boarding School, Gray Horse, Osage Nation, Indian Territory, open 1888–1913 and operated by the Bureau of Catholic Indian Missions
- St. Joseph's Boarding School, Chickasha, Oklahoma
- St. Mary's Academy, near Asher, Potowatamie Nation, Indian Territory, open 1880–1946
- St. Louis Industrial School, Pawhuska, Osage Nation, Indian Territory, open 1887–1949 and operated by the Bureau of Catholic Indian Missions
- St. Mary's Boarding School, Quapaw Agency Indian Territory/Oklahoma, open 1893–1927
- St. Patrick's Mission and Boarding School, Anadarko, Indian Territory, open 1892–1909 by the Bureau of Catholic Indian Missions. It was rebuilt and called the Anadarko Boarding School.
- Sasakwa Female Academy, Sasakwa, Seminole Nation, Indian Territory, open 1880–1892 and run by the Methodist Episcopal Church, South
- Seger Indian Training School, Colony, Indian Territory
- Seneca, Shawnee, and Wyandotte Industrial Boarding School, Wyandotte, Indian Territory
- Sequoyah High School, Tahlequah, Cherokee Nation, Indian Territory
- Shawnee Boarding School, near Shawnee, Indian Territory, open 1876–1918
- Shawnee Boarding School, Shawnee, Oklahoma, open 1923–1961
- Sulphur Springs Indian School, Pontotoc County, Chickasaw Nation, Indian Territory open 1896–98
- Tullahassee Mission School, Tullahassee, Creek Nation, Indian Territory, opened 1850 burned 1880
- Tullahassee Manual Labor School, Tullahassee, Creek Nation, Indian Territory, open 1883–1914 for Creek Freedmen
- Tushka Lusa Institute (later called Tuska Lusa or Tushkaloosa Academy), near Talihina, Choctaw Nation, Indian Territory opened 1892 for Choctaw Freedmen
- Tuskahoma Female Academy, Lyceum, Choctaw Nation, Indian Territory, open 1892–1925
- Wapanucka Academy (also sometimes called Allen Academy), near Bromide, Chickasaw Nation, Indian Territory. Open 1851–1911 by the Presbyterian Church.
- Wewoka Mission School, (also known as Ramsey Mission School) near Wewoka, Seminole Nation, Indian Territory. Open 1868–80 by the Presbyterian Mission Board.
- Wheelock Academy, Millerton, Oklahoma, closed 1955
- Wetumka Boarding School, Wetumka, Creek Nation, Indian Territory. Levering Manual Labor School transferred from the Baptists to the Muscogee (Creek) Nation in 1891 and they changed the name to the Wetumka Boarding School. Operated until 1910.
- Yellow Springs School, Pontotoc County, Chickasaw Nation, Indian Territory, open 1896–1905

=== Oregon ===
Umatilla Indian School in 1903.

- Chemawa Indian School, near Salem, open 1880 to present
- Grand Ronde Agency School – Grand Ronde
- Indian Manual Labor Training School – Willamette
- Klamath Agency Schools (2) – Klamath Falls
- Siletz Agency School – Tillamook
- Umatilla Indian School - near Pendleton
- Warm Springs Agency Schools (2) – Warm Springs

=== Pennsylvania ===
- Carlisle Indian School, Carlisle, Pennsylvania, open 1879–1918

=== South Dakota ===
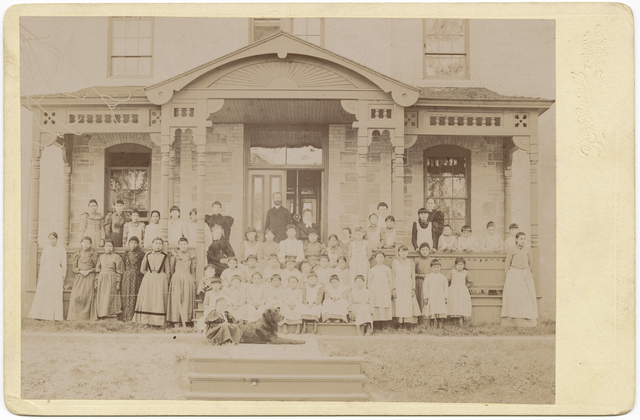
Hope Indian School, Springfield, South Dakota

- Chamberlain Indian School, Chamberlain, South Dakota opened from 1898 to 1908 when it closed, reopened later in 1927 as St. Josephs Indian School.
- Flandreau Indian School, Flandreau, South Dakota opened in 1872 as a mission school and then as a boarding school in 1890. As of 2025, it is still in operation.
- Good Will Mission, Sisseton, South Dakota open 1872 to 1910.
- Immaculate Conception Indian School, Stephan, South Dakota opened in 1886 under the Bureau of Catholic Indian Missions, later renamed the Stephan Indian School. Came under control of the Crow Creek tribe in 1970 and is now the Crow Creek Tribal School
- Marty Indian School, Marty, South Dakota The school was founded in 1924 as St. Paul's Indian Mission School and has been tribally owned and operated by the Yankton Sioux Tribe since 1975.
- Oahe Industrial School, Pierre, South Dakota opened in 1874 by Congregationalists until construction of the Oahe Dam in the 1950s closed the school and flooded the land.
- Pierre Indian School, Pierre, South Dakota opened in 1891 and still in operation today
- Pine Ridge Boarding School, Pine Ridge, South Dakota opened in 1888 as the Holy Rosary Mission by the Jesuits, renamed the Red Cloud Indian School in 1969
- St. Joseph's Indian School, Chamberlain, South Dakota, opened in 1927, run by the Priests of the Sacred Heart and still in operation
- St. Elizabeth's Indian School, Wakpala, South Dakota opened 1886–1967
- Rapid City Indian School, Rapid City, South Dakota open from 1898 to 1933
- Springfield Indian School, Springfield, South Dakota opened as the Hope Indian Mission in 1879, renamed the St. Mary's Indian School for Girls in 1902, and closed by the 1970s.
- Sisseton Industrial School, Sisseton, South Dakota opened in 1873 as the Sisseton Manual Labor Boarding School, later named the Sisseton Industrial school in 1902, and closed by 1919
- Tekakwitha Indian Orphanage, Sisseton, South Dakota, opened by the Oblates of Mary Immaculate in 1938 and closed by the late 1960s.

=== Utah ===
- Intermountain Indian School, Utah

=== Virginia ===
- Hampton Institute, Hampton, Virginia, began accepting Native students in 1878.

=== Washington ===
- Fort Simcoe, Fort Simcoe State Park, WA
- Puyallup Indian School, Tacoma, Washington, open 1860–1920
- St. Mary's Mission Pascal Sherman Indian School, Omak, WA
- Tulalip Indian School, Tulalip, WA

=== Wisconsin ===
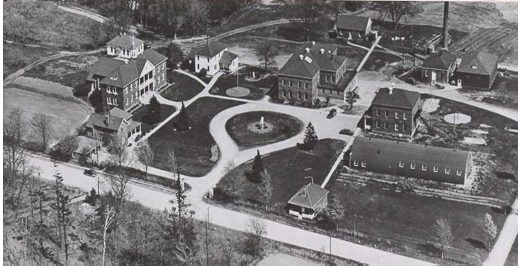
Oneida Indian Boarding School

- Hayward Indian School, Hayward, Wisconsin
- Oneida Indian School, Wisconsin
- Tomah Indian School, Wisconsin
- Wittenberg Indian School, Wittenberg, Wisconsin

== See also ==
- Alaskan habeas petitions
- American Indian outing programs
- Canadian Indian residential school system
- Canton Indian Insane Asylum, an institution in South Dakota in which Native Americans were held against their will, one-third of whom died there
- Cultural assimilation of Native Americans
- Cultural genocide
- Fort Shaw Indian School Girls Basketball Team
- Indian Placement Program
- Indian Relocation Act of 1956
- Indian Reorganization Act of 1934
- Native schools in New Zealand
- Linguicide
- Tobeluk v. Lind, a landmark case in Native education where 27 teenaged Alaskan Native plaintiffs brought suit against the State of Alaska claiming that their boarding school experiences were racial discrimination and educational inequity.
