= Federal Indian Boarding School Initiative =

The Federal Indian Boarding School Initiative was created in June 2021 by Deb Haaland, the United States Secretary of the Interior, to investigate defunct residential boarding schools established under the Civilization Fund Act and that housed Native American children. It is an effort to document known schools and burial grounds, including those with unmarked graves. There will be an attempt to identify and repatriate children's remains to their families or nations.

== Creation ==
Haaland announced the creation of the initiative at the National Congress of American Indians (NCAI) 2021 Mid Year Conference. She initiated this in response to an announcement in May 2021 of the discovery of 215 unidentified remains found at the Kamloops Indian Residential School in Kamloops, British Columbia, Canada, which had a large program of boarding schools similar to those in the United States for assimilation of native children.

The initiative will involve an investigation of boarding schools in the United States and former territories in an effort to document all known schools, assess their effects, and identify missing children. Haaland said that teams would find and review records, and speak with members of local tribes and survivors. Effects of the schools are to be documented, in addition to recording accounts of missing children. Plans are underway to have investigations of unmarked graves at some of the larger schools.

Initially projected for release in April 2022, the first report was released May 11, 2022. In addition to documenting hundreds of schools and their programs, it includes next steps in the federal initiative, including a search for children's remains.

It is estimated that there were over 350 American Indian boarding schools in operation across the United States at one time. There are still Native American boarding schools in operation through the Department of the Interior, but these schools are now under day-to-day management by the Bureau of Indian Education.

The investigation includes a series of Road to Healing events to bring together survivors and their stories.

== Reception ==
This initiative was applauded by Native tribes and organizations, including the National Congress of American Indians, the National Indian Child Welfare Association, Affiliated Tribes of Northwest Indians, and National Native American Boarding School Healing Coalition. National Congress of American Indians President, Fawn Sharp, of the Quinault Indian Nation released the following statement on the initiative:

"“The National Congress of American Indians commends the Department of Interior for taking the essential first step of providing an official account of the atrocities that Native children experienced during the boarding school era. By documenting who, what, when and where these egregious abuses occurred, Native families may not be able to fully heal, but they may be able to begin to reconcile with the past. Many mothers, fathers, siblings, and children of boarding school victims and survivors have walked on without ever knowing the full extent of what happened to their loved ones. But knowledge is power. By learning the truth, we can finally begin reconciling the past and healing for the future.”."

== Collaboration ==
Upon hearing of the Federal Indian Boarding School Initiative, Canadian Minister of Crown–Indigenous Relations, Carolyn Bennett offered records to the United States, if needed, that had been collected by the National Centre for Truth and Reconciliation since 2016. Numerous tribes and First Nations have territories that span the historic border between Canada and the US, and their children may have been in schools on either side.

== Findings of the Report ==
On May 11, 2022, Volume 1 of the report was released. In addition to summarizing the investigation, it identified further steps that would need to be taken. A second volume is anticipated. As information for Volume 1 was being collected during the COVID-19 pandemic, many federal offices were closed, which hindered investigation efforts.

Volume 1, officially named the Federal Indian Boarding School Initiative Investigative Report identifies 408 boarding schools and at least 53 burial sites that operated across the mainland United States, Alaska, and Hawaii over a 150-year period. The 106-page report explains the laws and policies that aided in creation of the schools, the role of religious organizations in running the schools, and some of the adverse practices and conditions that prevailed in treatment of native children to force assimilation.

Volume 2, officially named the Federal Indian Boarding School Initiative Investigative Report Vol. II, discovered that sixty-five federal boarding schools contained gravesites for Native American children, and found that "at least" 973 children died in the federal school system.
