= National Native American Boarding School Healing Coalition =

- Formation: 2012; 14 years ago
- Headquarters: Minneapolis, Minnesota, United States
- Website: boardingschoolhealing.org

The National Native American Boarding School Healing Coalition (NABS) is a nonprofit created in June 2012. It is composed of more than eighty organizations that are dedicated to healing Native American communities affected by Indian Boarding Schools in the United States.

== History ==
The idea for NABS sprang out a symposium held in 2011. Participants at the symposium decided that the United States needed an organization to raise awareness about the negative effects of boarding schools that oppressed generations of Native American children after being established under the Civilization Fund Act. Studies have found extensive abuses at numerous schools, which effectively were committing cultural genocide. NABS was initially a subsidiary under the Native American Rights Fund (NARF) but gained independence in 2015.

According to the Federal Indian Boarding School Initiative Investigative Report Vol. II, "between 1819 and 1969, the Federal Indian boarding school system consisted of 417 Federal schools across 37 states or then-territories, including 22 schools in Alaska and 7 schools in Hawaiʻi." The report also indicates another 1,025 Indian boarding schools that were operated in the United States, but were not federally run. Volume II of the report confirmed the deaths of 973 indigenous people, including those in Alaska and Hawai'i.

== Advocacy and Strategic Plans ==
In January 2020, NABS announced a detailed strategic plan to take place over the next ten years (ending in 2030.) The plan proposes four areas of action: "establishing a national truth and healing center, developing curriculum, producing a documentary series, creating a national digital archive, and issuing policy statements that support the work of tribes and other agencies related to boarding schools." The strategic plan was enabled by a $10 million donation from the Kendeda Fund.

Other strategic goals by NABS including engaging the Native American community in conversations with local and national governments, and advocating for policies to document the history of the Native American boarding schools and their effects on Native American communities. NABS also seeks to engage churches into taking responsibility for their role in the ethnocide of Native American culture, and genocide of Native American children.

=== United Nations Claim ===
In April 2019, NABS, in connection with several other Native American rights organizations and led by the International Indian Treaty Council, filed a claim with the UN Working Group on Enforced or Involuntary Disappearances in regards to indigenous children who went missing while attending American Indian boarding schools. The following month, NABS and the other organizations testified before the United Nations and urged that the U.N. encourage the United States to investigate and document the fates of the missing native children.

=== Federal Boarding School Initiative ===
In June 2021, Christine Diindiisi McCleave, Chief Executive of NABS, announced support for the Federal Indian Boarding School Initiative, which would investigate records to assess and document known boarding schools. It would also try to determine if there were unidentified remains of children buried on the grounds of such schools.

=== Truth and Healing Commission on Indian Boarding School Policies Act of 2026 ===
In 2026, congress members Tom Cole of Oklahoma and Sharice Davids of Kansas introduced House Resolution 7325, also referred to as the Truth and Healing Commission Bill.

The bill, which had input from NABS over several revisions, was fully supported by the organization. If passed, the bill will create a first-of-its-kind commission with five members who will have the power to investigate the relationship between the United States Federal Government and the Indian boarding schools. The commission will also be able to recommend reparations.

== Projects ==
=== We Love You! ===
In 2020, in response to the COVID-19 pandemic, NABS worked with volunteers from the Tulalip tribe in Washington state to create care packages for American Indian elders who had survived the American Indian boarding schools system. The We Love You! project sent 1,000 care packages to elders or their direct descendants over 60 years old. Deborah Parker(Tulalip) proposed the care package project. Each box contained items produced by Native American companies, and included N95 masks, sage bundles, medicine bags, and coloring books.

=== Oral History Project ===
In 2024, NABS received a grant from the Federal Indian Boarding School Initiative to interview survivors of Indian boarding schools that were operated in the United States of America. As of Summer of 2026, the project has interviewed dozens of survivors across multiple states in cities such as Milwaukee, Wisconsin, Rochester, New York,Snoqualmie, Washington and Albuquerque, New Mexico . The project selected Oklahoma as the first state to interview survivors as the state had the most Indian board schools at one time. As many as 400 survivors have been interviewed over the course of the two-year project.

=== Education ===
NABS has also collaborated with the National Indian Education Association to create "a 12-module curriculum" targeting the long-standing detrimental effects stemming from cultural ethnocide committed by the boarding schools. The program is geared toward Native American educators, students, and community members.
