= St. Mary's Mission boarding school =

Coordinates: 47°52′26″N 95°1′52″W

St. Mary's Mission Boarding and Day School is a school on the Red Lake Indian Reservation in Minnesota. It was founded in 1888 as an Indian boarding school serving the Ojibwe.

== History ==
=== Red Lake Mission ===
The first attempt at a Red Lake mission was by Protestant missionaries associated with Oberlin College, including Frederick Ayer and David Brainerd Spencer who arrived at the area with the help of Yellow Bird. Their mission effort began in 1842 and lasted until 1859, and included a school which taught in both Ojibwe and English. In 1858, Roman Catholic priests Francis Pierz and Lawrence Lautishar, who had previously been at Crow Wing, established St. Mary's mission.

=== St. Mary's school ===
On October 11, 1884, 112 members of the Red Lake Nation sent a letter asking the Benedictine abbot in St. Joseph to bring a mission and a school to Red Lake. In 1888, two sisters and two priests arrived. They organized a school at the mission to serve the Ojibwe, teaching Christianity and English. It was supported in part thanks to donations from Katharine Drexel, a wealthy philanthropist from Philadelphia who visited Red Lake. Founded as a day school, it soon became a boarding school. At the time, some estimate that the local population was already about 30% Catholic due to previous missionary work.

St. Mary's was one of sixteen Indian boarding schools in Minnesota. In 1902, the school boarded an average of 62 students.

The mission school was nearer to the town of Red Lake than the federally funded Bureau of Indian Affairs school, which made the BIA school inaccessible for many in Minnesota's winter months. Native parents could divert their individual treaty and trust funds to pay for tuition at Catholic schools like St. Mary's. Many students had little money and few other schooling options. In 1936, the Red Lake general council passed a resolution allowing tuition contracts to cover only a single year and required that St. Mary's provide proper food and should not be run for profit. A Red Lake Indian Agency social worker also contacted agency superintendent Raymond H. Bitney regarding tuition payments and the poor quality of education at the mission school, but these complaints had little effect.

In the 1940, the school returned to offering education for day students only. The last nuns left the school in 2009 due to lack of personnel.

== Present-day ==
St. Mary's is no longer associated with the Sisters of the Order of Saint Benedict or the Order of Saint Benedict. It converted to a day school in the 1940s.

In 2017, St. Mary's Mission burned, including the school, and was rebuilt.

The school is still open as a tuition day school.
