= National Register of Historic Places listings in Wagoner County, Oklahoma =

Location of Wagoner County in Oklahoma

This is a list of the National Register of Historic Places listings in Wagoner County, Oklahoma.

This is intended to be a complete list of the properties and districts on the National Register of Historic Places in Wagoner County, Oklahoma, United States. The locations of National Register properties and districts for which the latitude and longitude coordinates are included below, may be seen in a map.

There are 21 properties and districts listed on the National Register in the county.

This National Park Service list is complete through NPS recent listings posted October 23, 2026.

== Current listings ==
	Name on the Register	Image	Date listed	Location	City or town	Description
1	Cobb Building	Cobb Building	September 13, 1982 (#82003709)	203 E. Cherokee St. 35°57′37″N 95°22′34″W	Wagoner	
2	First National Bank of Wagoner	First National Bank of Wagoner	March 10, 1983 (#83002140)	114 E. Cherokee St. 35°57′34″N 95°22′38″W	Wagoner	
3	First Presbyterian Church of Coweta	First Presbyterian Church of Coweta	March 7, 2003 (#03000099)	200 S. Ave. B 35°56′58″N 95°39′06″W	Coweta	
4	John W. Gibson House	John W. Gibson House	July 6, 1982 (#82003710)	402 S. McQuarrie; 35°57′22″N 95°22′01″W	Wagoner	
5	Jamison Cemetery		June 20, 2012 (#12000349)	2 miles (3.2 km) south on OK 16 & 2 miles (3.2 km) west on County Rd. E0820; 35°50′16″N 95°21′26″W	Okay vicinity	
6	Koweta Mission Site	Koweta Mission Site	June 19, 1973 (#73001571)	1 mile (1.6 km) south of Coweta off State Highway 51B; 35°55′52″N 95°38′37″W	Coweta	
7	A. J. Mason Building		August 5, 1985 (#85001743)	Lincoln St. 35°50′20″N 95°26′18″W	Tullahassee	
8	William McAnally House		July 6, 1982 (#82003711)	702 7th St., SE. 35°57′04″N 95°22′02″W	Wagoner	
9	Collin McKinney House	Collin McKinney House	July 6, 1982 (#82003708)	1106 7th St., SE; 35°57′05″N 95°21′44″W	Wagoner	
10	Miller-Washington School		September 28, 1984 (#84003448)	Market St. 35°53′49″N 95°35′13″W	Redbird	Destroyed
11	Newport Hotel and Restaurant	Newport Hotel and Restaurant	December 4, 1985 (#85003079)	202 S. Main; 35°57′31″N 95°22′38″W	Wagoner	
12	Amos Parkinson House	Amos Parkinson House	July 6, 1982 (#82003712)	601 N. Parkinson; 35°57′55″N 95°22′26″W	Wagoner	
13	Frederick Parkinson House	Frederick Parkinson House	July 6, 1982 (#82003713)	407 3rd St., NE. 35°57′48″N 95°22′23″W	Wagoner	
14	Red Bird City Hall		September 28, 1984 (#84003450)	Boston St. 35°53′40″N 95°35′22″W	Redbird	
15	Rio Grande Ranch Headquarters Historic District		September 9, 1992 (#92001191)	State Highway 251A, 3 miles (4.8 km) east of Okay; 35°50′53″N 95°15′29″W	Okay	
16	St James Episcopal Church	St James Episcopal Church	May 11, 1982 (#82003714)	303 S. Church St. 35°57′30″N 95°22′22″W	Wagoner	
17	Thomas Smith Cemetery		July 6, 2026 (#100012029)	East 41st Street South; 36°06′18″N 95°44′07″W	Broken Arrow	
18	Tullahassee Mission Site	Tullahassee Mission Site	September 10, 1971 (#71000674)	Address Restricted	Tullahassee	
19	Van Tuyl Homeplace		February 7, 1978 (#78002276)	North of Porter; 35°55′48″N 95°32′32″W	Porter	
20	Wagoner Armory	Wagoner Armory	May 20, 1994 (#94000490)	509 E. Cherokee St. 35°57′36″N 95°22′15″W	Wagoner	
21	Way House		July 6, 1982 (#82003715)	411 2nd St., NE. 35°57′43″N 95°22′20″W	Wagoner	Apparently demolished for church expansion, c2010

== See also ==
- List of National Historic Landmarks in Oklahoma
- National Register of Historic Places listings in Oklahoma
