= Coweta (disambiguation) =

Coweta can refer to:

Coweta (tribal town), one of four mother towns of the Muscogee Creek Confederacy

- Coweta, Oklahoma, United States
  - Coweta Public Schools
  - Coweta High School
- Coweta County, Georgia, United States

== See also ==
- Koweta Mission Site
