= List of Native American boarding schools =

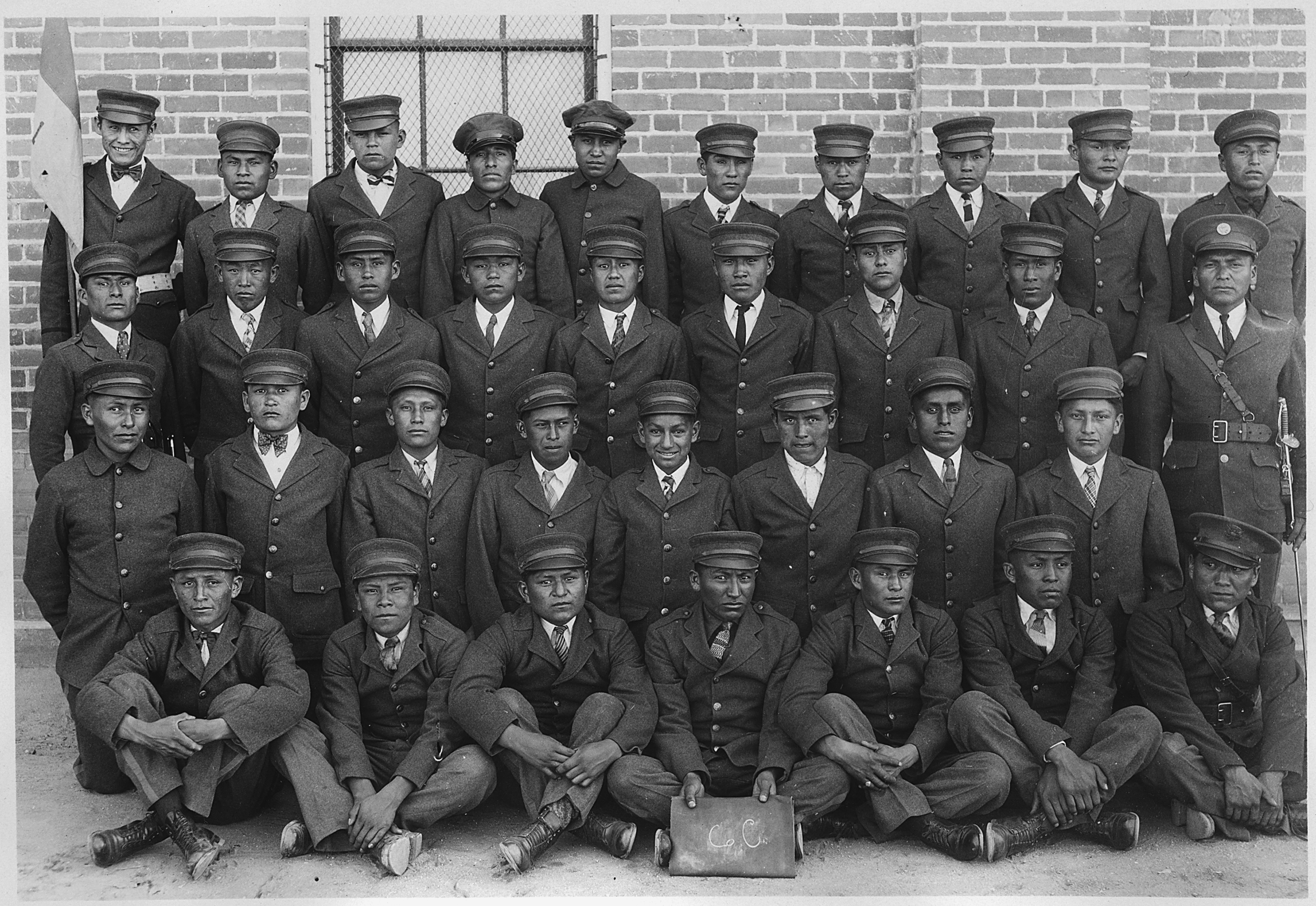
Male students in uniform at Albuquerque Indian School (1881–1982), photographed c. 1910

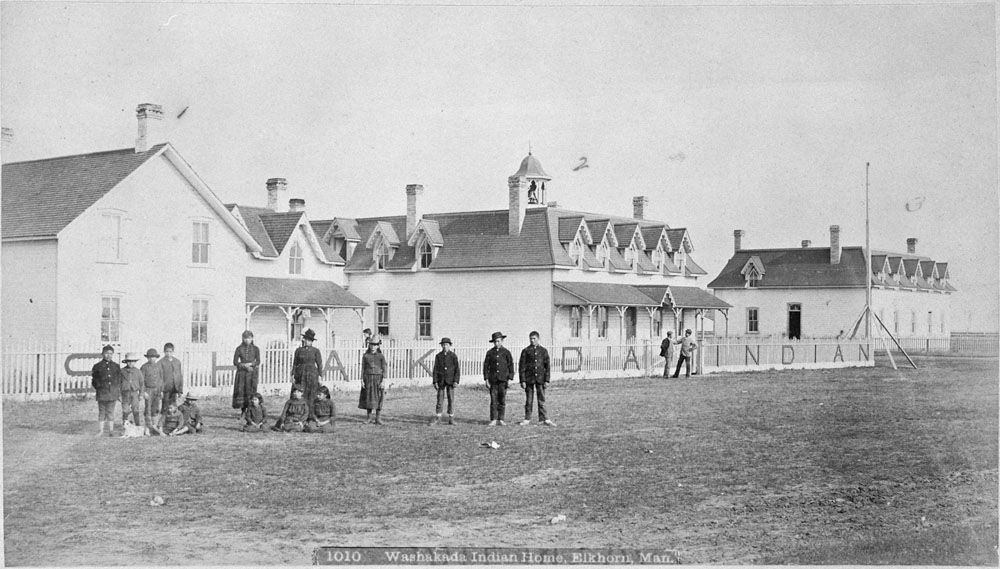
Students at Washakada Indian Residential School, Elkhorn, Manitoba c. 1900

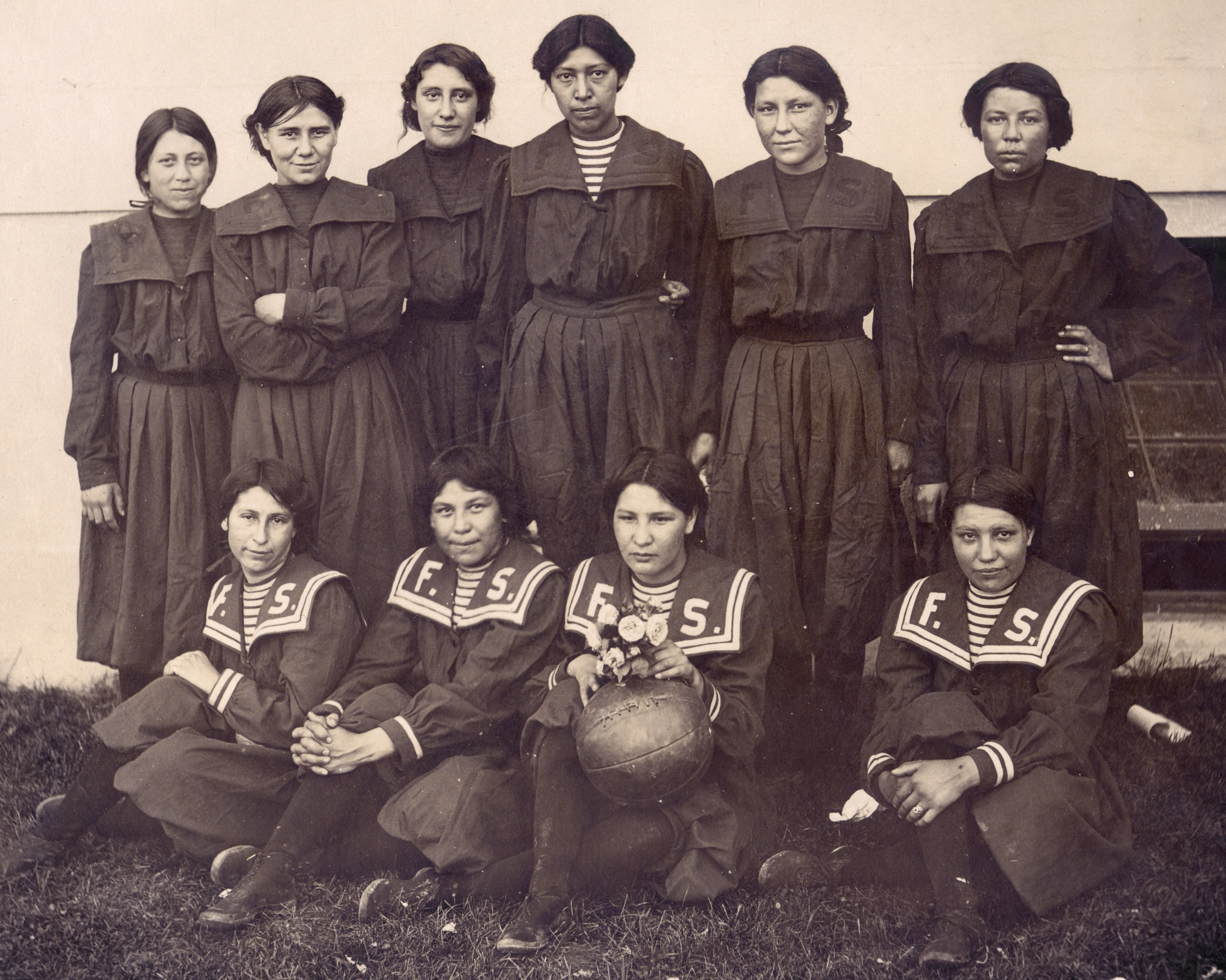
Fort Shaw Indian School Girls Basketball Team, 1904

This is an alphabetical list of Native American boarding schools. For the article about the system in the United States, see: American Indian boarding schools. For the similar system in Canada, see: Canadian Indian residential school system For other uses, see: Indian school (disambiguation).

This list is far from complete as recent reports show more than 408 American Indian Boarding Schools in the United States. Additionally, according to the Inaugural Department of the Interior Indian Boarding School report released on May 12, 2022. There were 408 schools in 37 states, and 53 unmarked/marked burial sites recorded. Secretary of the Interior Deb Haaland (Laguna Pueblo) has said that the former United States policies were "heartbreaking and undeniable."

- Absentee Shawnee Boarding School, near Shawnee, Indian Territory, open 1893–99
- Albuquerque Indian School, Albuquerque, New Mexico
- Anadarko Boarding School, Anadarko, Oklahoma, open 1911–33
- Arapaho Manual Labor and Boarding School, Darlington, Indian Territory, opened in 1872 and paid for by federal funds; operated by the Hicksite (Liberal) Friends and Orthodox Quakers. Moved to Concho Indian Boarding School in 1909.
- Armstrong Academy, near Chahta Tamaha, Indian Territory
- Asbury Manual Labor School, near Fort Mitchell, Alabama, open 1822–30, and operated by the United Methodist Missions.
- Asbury Manual Labor School, near Eufaula, Creek Nation, Indian Territory, open 1850–88, by the United Methodist Missions.
- Bacone College, Muscogee, Oklahoma, 1881–present
- Bloomfield Female Academy, originally near Achille, Chickasaw Nation, Indian Territory. Opened in 1848 but relocated to Ardmore, Oklahoma around 1917; in 1934 it was renamed as Carter Seminary.
- Bond's Mission School or Montana Industrial School for Indians, run by Unitarians, Crow Indian Reservation near Custer Station, Montana, 1886–97
- Burney Institute, near Lebanon, Chickasaw Nation, Indian Territory, open 1854–87, when name changed to Chickasaw Orphan Home and Manual Labor School; it was operated by the Cumberland Presbyterian Church.
- Cameron Institute, Cameron, Choctaw Nation, Indian Territory open 1893–early 20th century, was operated by the Presbyterian Church
- Cantonment Indian Boarding School, Canton, Indian Territory, run by the General Conference Mennonites from September, 1882 to 1 July 1927.
- Carlisle Indian School, Carlisle, Pennsylvania, open 1879–1918.
- Carter Seminary, Ardmore, Oklahoma, open 1917–2004, when the facility moved to Kingston, Oklahoma. It was renamed as the Chickasaw Children's Village.
- Chamberlain Indian School, Chamberlain, South Dakota, open 1898–1909
- Chemawa Indian School, Salem, Oregon
- Cherokee Female Seminary, Tahlequah, Cherokee Nation, Indian Territory, open 1851–1910; this was established by the Cherokee Nation
- Cherokee Male Seminary, Tahlequah, Cherokee Nation, Indian Territory, open 1851–1910. First established by the Cherokee Nation.
- Cherokee Orphan Asylum, Tahlequah, Cherokee Nation, Indian Territory, opened in 1871
- Cheyenne-Arapaho Boarding School, Darlington, Indian Territory, opened 1871 became the Arapaho Manual Labor and Boarding School in 1879
- Cheyenne Manual Labor and Boarding School, Caddo Springs, Indian Territory, opened 1879 and paid with by federal funds, but run by the Hicksite (Liberal) Friends and Orthodox Quakers. Moved to Concho Indian Boarding School in 1909.
- Chickasaw (male) Academy, near Tishomingo, Chickasaw Nation, Oklahoma Opened in 1850 by the Methodist Episcopal Church and changed its name to Harley Institute around 1889.
- Chickasaw Children's Village, on Lake Texoma near Kingston, Oklahoma, opened 2004
- Chickasaw National Academy, near Stonewall, Chickasaw Nation, Indian Territory, open about 1865 to 1880
- Chickasaw Orphan Home and Manual Labor School (formerly Burney Academy) near Lebanon, Chickasaw Nation, Indian Territory open 1887–1906
- Chilocco Indian Agricultural School, Chilocco, Oklahoma, open 1884–1980
- Chinle Boarding School, Many Farms, Arizona
- Choctaw Academy, Blue Spring, Scott County, Kentucky, opened 1825
- Chuala Female Seminary (also known as the Pine Ridge Mission School), near Doaksville, Choctaw Nation, Indian Territory, open 1838–61. by the Presbyterian Church
- Circle of Nations Indian School , Wahpeton, North Dakota
- Colbert Institute, Perryville, Choctaw Nation, Indian Territory, open 1852–57, operated by the Methodist Episcopal Church, South
- Collins Institute, near Stonewall, Chickasaw Nation, Indian Territory, open about 1885 to 1905
- Concho Indian Boarding School, Concho, Oklahoma open 1909–83
- Creek Orphan Asylum, Okmulgee, Creek Nation, Indian Territory, opened 1895
- Darlington Mission School, Darlington, Indian Territory run by the General Conference Mennonites from 1881 to 1902
- Dwight Mission, Marble City, Oklahoma
- Elliott Academy (formerly Oak Hill Industrial Academy), near Valliant, Oklahoma, open 1912–36
- El Meta Bond College, Minco, Chickasaw Nation, Indian Territory, open 1890–1919.
- Emahaka Mission, Wewoka, Seminole Nation, Indian Territory open 1894–1911
- Euchee Boarding School, Sapulpa, Creek Nation, Indian Territory open 1894–1947
- Eufaula Dormitory, Eufaula, Oklahoma name changed from Eufaula High School in 1952. Still in operation
- Eufaula Indian High School, Eufaula, Creek Nation, Indian Territory replaced the burned Asbury Manual Labor School. Open in 1892–1952, when the name changed to Eufaula Dormitory
- Flandreau Indian School, South Dakota
- Folsom Training School, near Smithville, Oklahoma open 1921–32, when it became an all-white school
- Fort Bidwell School, Fort Bidwell, California
- Fort Coffee Academy, Fort Coffee, Choctaw Nation, Indian Territory Open 1840–63 and run by the Methodist Episcopal Church, South
- Fort Shaw Indian School, Fort Shaw, Montana
- Fort Sill Indian School (originally known as Josiah Missionary School), near Fort Sill, Indian Territory opened in 1871 by the Quakers, remained open until 1980
- Fort Totten Indian Industrial School, Fort Totten, North Dakota. Boarding and Indian Industrial School in 1891–1935. Became a Community and Day School from 1940 to 1959. Now a Historic Site run by the State Historic Society of North Dakota.
- Genoa Indian Industrial School, Genoa, Nebraska
- Goodland Academy & Indian Orphanage, Hugo, Oklahoma
- Greenville School, California
- Hampton Institute, began accepting Native students in 1878
- Harley Institute, near Tishomingo, Chickasaw Nation, Oklahoma, Prior to it was known as the Chickasaw Academy. Operated 1889–1906 by the Methodist Episcopal Church until 1906.
- Haskell Indian Industrial Training School, Lawrence, Kansas, 1884–present
- Hayward Indian School, Hayward, Wisconsin
- Hillside Mission School, near Skiatook, Cherokee Nation, Indian Territory open 1884–1908, operated by the Quakers
- Holbrook Indian School, Holbrook, Arizona
- Ignacio Boarding School, Colorado
- Iowa Mission School, near Fallis, Iowa Reservation, Indian Territory open 1890–93 by the Quakers
- Intermountain Indian School, Utah
- Jones Academy, Hartshorne, Choctaw Nation, Indian Territory/Oklahoma Opened in 1891
- Koweta Mission School Coweta, Creek Nation, Indian Territory open 1843–61
- Levering Manual Labor School, Wetumka, Creek Nation, Indian Territory Open 1882–91, operated by the Southern Baptist Convention.
- Many Farms High School, near Many Farms, Arizona
- Martinsburg Indian School, Martinsburg, Pennsylvania 1885–1888
- Marty Indian School, Marty, South Dakota
- Mary Immaculate School, DeSmet, Idaho 1878–1974
- Mekasukey Academy, near Seminole, Seminole Nation, Indian Territory open 1891–1930
- Morris Industrial School for Indians, Morris, Minnesota, open 1887–1909
- Mount Edgecumbe High School, Sitka, Alaska, established as a BIA school, now operated by the State of Alaska
- Mount Pleasant Indian Industrial Boarding School, Mount Pleasant, Michigan, 1893–1934
- Murray State School of Agriculture, Tishomingo, Oklahoma, est. 1908
- Nenannezed Boarding School, New Mexico
- New Hope Academy, Fort Coffee, Choctaw Nation, Indian Territory Open 1844–96 and run by the Methodist Episcopal Church, South
- Nuyaka School and Orphanage (Nuyaka Mission, Presbyterian), Okmulgee, Creek Nation, Indian Territory, 1884–1933
- Oak Hill Industrial Academy, near Valliant, Choctaw Nation, Indian Territory Open 1878–1912 by the Presbyterian Mission Board. The Choctaw freedmen's academy was renamed as the Elliott Academy (aka Alice Lee Elliott Memorial Academy) in 1912.
- Oak Ridge Manual Labor School, near Holdenville, Indian Territory in the Seminole Nation. Open 1848–60s by the Presbyterian Mission Board.
- Oklahoma Presbyterian College for Girls, Durant, Oklahoma
- Oklahoma School for the Blind, Muskogee, Oklahoma
- Oklahoma School for the Deaf, Sulphur, Oklahoma
- Oneida Indian School, Wisconsin
- Osage Boarding School, Pawhuska, Osage Nation, Indian Territory open 1874–1922
- Panguitch Boarding School, Panguitch, Utah
- Park Hill Mission School, Park Hill Indian Territory/Oklahoma opened 1837
- Pawnee Boarding School, Pawnee, Indian Territory, open 1878–1958
- Phoenix Indian School, Phoenix, Arizona
- Pierre Indian School, Pierre, South Dakota
- Red Cloud Indian School [formerly Holy Rosary Mission], Pine Ridge, South Dakota
- Pine Ridge Mission School, near Doaksville, Choctaw Nation, Indian Territory see Chuala Female Seminary
- Pinon Boarding School, Pinon, Arizona
- Pipestone Indian School, Pipestone, Minnesota
- Quapaw Industrial Boarding School, Quapaw Agency Indian Territory open 1872–1900
- Rainy Mountain Boarding School, near Gotebo, Kiowa-Comanche-Apache Reservation, Indian Territory, open 1893–1920
- Rapid City Indian School, Rapid City, South Dakota
- Red Moon School, near Hammon, Indian Territory open 1897–1922
- Rehoboth Mission School located in Rehoboth, New Mexico near Navajo Nation. Operated as an Indian Boarding School by the Christian Reformed Church in North America from 1903 to the 1990s.
- Riverside Indian School, Anadarko, Oklahoma open 1871–present
- Sac and Fox Boarding School, near Stroud, Indian Territory, open 1872–1919 by the Quakers
- Sacred Heart College, near Asher, Potowatamie Nation, Indian Territory open 1884–1902
- Sacred Heart Institute, near Asher, Potowatamie Nation, Indian Territory open 1880–1929
- St. Agnes Academy, Ardmore, Oklahoma
- St. Agnes Mission, Antlers, Oklahoma
- St. Boniface Indian School, Banning, California
- St. Elizabeth's Boarding School, Purcell, Oklahoma
- St. John's Boarding School, Gray Horse, Osage Nation, Indian Territory open 1888–1913 and operated by the Bureau of Catholic Indian Missions
- St. Joseph's Boarding School, Chickasha, Oklahoma
- St. Joseph's Indian School, Chamberlain, South Dakota
- St. Mary's Academy, near Asher, Potowatamie Nation, Indian Territory open 1880–1946
- St. Louis Industrial School, Pawhuska, Osage Nation, Indian Territory open 1887–1949 and operated by the Bureau of Catholic Indian Missions
- St. Mary's Boarding School, Quapaw Agency Indian Territory/Oklahoma open 1893–1927
- St. Patrick's Mission and Boarding School, Anadarko, Indian Territory open 1892–1909 by the Bureau of Catholic Indian Missions. It was rebuilt and called the Anadarko Boarding School.
- San Juan Boarding School, New Mexico
- Santa Fe Indian School, Santa Fe, New Mexico
- Sasakwa Female Academy, Sasakwa, Seminole Nation, Indian Territory open 1880–92 and run by the Methodist Episcopal Church, South
- Seger Indian Training School, Colony, Indian Territory
- Seneca, Shawnee, and Wyandotte Industrial Boarding School, Wyandotte, Indian Territory
- Sequoyah High School, Tahlequah, Cherokee Nation, Indian Territory
- Shawnee Boarding School, near Shawnee, Indian Territory, open 1876–1918
- Shawnee Boarding School, Shawnee, Oklahoma open 1923–61
- Sherman Indian High School, Riverside, California
- Shiprock Boarding School, Shiprock, New Mexico
- Southwestern Indian Polytechnic Institute, Albuquerque, New Mexico
- Spencer Academy (sometimes referred to as the National School of the Choctaw Nation), near Doaksville, Choctaw Nation, Indian Territory open 1842–1900
- Springfield Indian School, Springfield, South Dakota
- Stewart Indian School, Carson City, Nevada
- Sulphur Springs Indian School, Pontotoc County, Chickasaw Nation, Indian Territory open 1896–98
- Theodore Roosevelt Indian Boarding School, founded in 1923 in buildings of the U.S. Army's closed Fort Apache, Arizona, as of 2016 still in operation as a tribal school
- Thomas Indian School, near Irving, New York
- Tomah Indian School, Wisconsin
- Tullahassee Mission School, Tullahassee, Creek Nation, Indian Territory opened 1850 burned 1880
- Tullahassee Manual Labor School, Tullahassee, Creek Nation, Indian Territory open 1883–1914 for Creek Freedmen
- Tushka Lusa Institute (later called Tuska Lusa or Tushkaloosa Academy), near Talihina, Choctaw Nation, Indian Territory opened 1892 for Choctaw Freedmen
- Tuskahoma Female Academy, Lyceum, Choctaw Nation, Indian Territory open 1892–1925
- Wahpeton Indian School, Wahpeton, North Dakota, 1904–93. In 1993 its name was changed to Circle of Nations School and came under tribal control. Currently open.
- Wapanucka Academy (also sometimes called Allen Academy), near Bromide, Chickasaw Nation, Indian Territory Open 1851–1911 by the Presbyterian Church.
- Wealaka Mission School Wealaka, Indian Territory open 1882–1907
- Wetumka Boarding School, Wetumka, Creek Nation, Indian Territory, opened as Israel G. Vore and Levering Manual Labor School transferred from the Baptists to the Muscogee (Creek) Nation in 1891 and they changed the name to the Wetumka Boarding School. Operated until 1910.
- Wewoka Mission School, (also known as Ramsey Mission School) near Wewoka, Seminole Nation, Indian Territory Open 1868–80 by the Presbyterian Mission Board.
- Wheelock Academy, Millerton, Oklahoma closed 1955
- White's Manual Labor Institute, Wabash, Indiana Open 1870–95 and operated by the Quakers
- White's Manual Labor Institute, West Branch, Iowa, open 1881–87
- Wittenberg Indian School, Wittenberg, Wisconsin
- Yellow Springs School, Pontotoc County, Chickasaw Nation, Indian Territory open 1896–1905
