= David Hodge =

David Hodge may refer to:

- David Hodge (Conservative politician), leader of Surrey County Council
- David Hodge (Labour politician) (1909–1991), Lord Provost of Glasgow
- David C. Hodge (born 1948), President of Miami University
- David McKellop Hodge (1841–1920), Creek Nation politician
- Dave Hodge (born 1945), Canadian sports announcer
- David Hodge and Hi-Jin Kang Hodge, American filmmakers and video artists

== See also ==
- David Hodges (disambiguation)
