= Lilah Denton Lindsey =

American civic leader and women's club organizer (1860–1943)

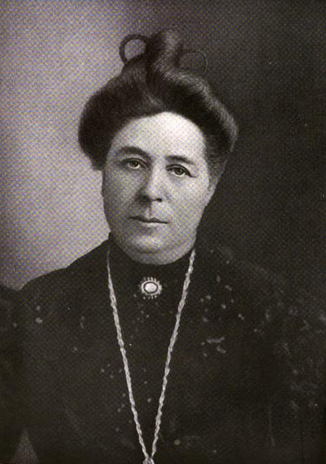
Lilah Denton Lindsey

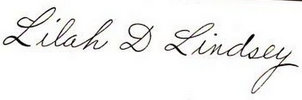

Lilah Denton Lindsey (October 21, 1860 – December 22, 1943) was a Native American philanthropist, civic leader, women's community organizer, temperance worker, and teacher. She was the first Muscogee woman to earn a college degree. She led numerous civic organizations and served as president of the Indian Territory Woman's Christian Temperance Union (WCTU).

== Early years and education ==
Lilah Denton was born in 1860 near Blue Creek, Coweta District, Muscogee Nation, Indian Territory. Her father, John Denton, was Cherokee and her mother, Susan (McKellop), was Muscogee. They were born in Alabama and were the decedents of Scots. As children, they and their families were removed in the early 1830s to what was established as the Muscogee Nation of Indian Territory. Lindsey, as "Lila D. Lindsey", is listed on the Dawes Rolls as "Creek by Blood" with a 1/4th Creek blood quantum. Susan McKellop's family were missionaries. She became a physician and practiced in the Muscogee Nation in its early days.

Lilah Denton was the youngest in the family of six children and the only one to survive to adulthood: four siblings died in infancy, and the fifth at the age of 12 years. When Denton was 16, both her parents died. As a girl, Lilah attended Tullahassee Mission, a Muscogee boarding school that the Nation founded in 1850. Her mother was educated in the same school. At the time, Muscogee girls were not allowed to enter schools until the age of 12. Her first teacher at Tullahassee Mission was Eliza J. Baldwin. She was instrumental in directing Denton's education and encouraging her interest in the broad field of philanthropy, which she made her life work.

Denton had grown up speaking only the Muscogee language in her family and community. At school, she learned English. Lliah received a scholarships to further her education at Synodical Female College in Fulton, Missouri, and Hillsboro-Highland Institute in Hillsboro, Ohio. The spring before she graduated with honors in 1833 from Hillsboro, she was appointed by the Home Mission Board of schools at New York City to teach at the Wealaka Mission in the Muscogee Nation, to which the former Tullahassee Mission had been transferred in 1882.

== Teacher ==
Denton's natural ability and her love for teaching soon gave her a high standing as an able educator in the old Indian Territory. She taught for a time at the Presbyterian Mission in Wealaka, also at the Coweta Mission, and for approximately three years at Tulsa. Altogether, she spent about 10 years in the mission schools.

In 1884, at the Wealaka Mission, Denton married Col. Lee W. Lindsey (born 1845, Ohio). He served in an Ohio regiment of cavalry during the Civil War. After peace was restored, he moved South, living for several years in Alabama. He supervised the quarrying of stone for building the first machine shops at Birmingham. After becoming a building contractor, during the 1870s, he moved to the Muscogee Nation, Indian Territory. Col. Lindsey completed the walls and enclosure of the Creek Council House at Okmulgee.

The couple moved to Tulsa in 1886. For many years, they were central figures in the political and civic life of Northeastern Oklahoma. After her marriage and at the solicitation of her friends, Lindsey took a position of teacher in the public schools of Oklahoma. The State Board of Education did not require her to take the customary examination for the position.

== Organizer ==
Lindsey lived in Tulsa for 28 years. She led many woman's organizations in the city, and also did individual charity work for years. She visited the sick, personally secured donations for the needy, and practically did the work of a humane officer. She organized the Humane society. Her interest in charitable work attracted the attention of state officials. Oklahoma Governor Charles N. Haskell appointed her as the Oklahoma delegate to the International Tuberculosis Conference held at Washington, D.C., and she was sent to numerous state charity associations. She secured the donation of a tract of land to establish a Florence Crittenton Home for Fallen Girls at Tulsa. Failing health prevented her from completing its construction.

For years, Lindsey was active in the Women's Presbyterian Board of Foreign Missions of the Southwest. She was an ardent church worker and at one time was the oldest member of the First Presbyterian church in Tulsa.

She became a member of the WCTU and organized a union chapter in her city. From that time until statehood, she was president of the Indian Territory WCTU. She later served as vice-president of the Oklahoma organization, president of the Tulsa County and the local union, and for one year edited the official organ of the Indian Territory WCTU. At the World's Convention of the WCTU held in Boston, Lindsey was introduced to the assembly of women from all nations as a "real native of America".

When Lindsey established the Tulsa chapter of the WCTU, she effectively organized the city's first woman's club. The National WCTU was the first woman's club organized in America. She arranged for a police matron to be appointed in the city, also a first for the state, to assist girls being taken to court. When she met with the city council to propose the office, Lindsey had the preliminaries so well planned that the office was approved and the woman she recommended was hired and commissioned to begin work the following morning. She also served as vice-president of the Women's National Rivers and Harbors Congress.

Lindsey also organized both the Maccabees and the Woman's Relief Corps in Tulsa. She was a member of the executive board of the latter organization. One year, she audited the local chapter's books in Atlantic City. She attended nine national Grand Army of the Republic assemblies.

Lindsey was strongly interested in the preservation of Native American landmarks, especially the Creek Capitol Building at Okmulgee. She encouraged it to be adapted as a museum for the preservation and interpretation of Creek relics. Her husband built the stone wall around the building and planted trees around it. She taught a term of school in one of its rooms.

== Legacy ==
Inducted into the Oklahoma Hall of Fame in 1937, she later died on December 22, 1943, in Tulsa, aged 83. The Lilah Lindsey School was named in 1957 in her honor.
