= Robert McGill Loughridge =

American missionary (1809–1900)

- Robert Loughridge
- Born: December 24, 1809; Lawrenceville, South Carolina, US
- Died: July 8, 1900 (aged 91); Waco, Texas, US
- Education: Miami University, at Oxford, Ohio
- Occupation: Missionary

Robert McGill Loughridge (December 24, 1809 – July 8, 1900) was an American Presbyterian missionary who served among the Creek in Indian Territory. He attended Miami University, Ohio, and graduated in 1837. Loughridge was ordained as a Presbyterian minister in October 1842.

He entered Indian Territory in 1843, when he established the Koweta Mission in the Creek Nation. Seven years later, in 1850, he established the Tullahassee Mission, also in Creek territory.

Like most missionaries, he left the territory during the American Civil War, and preached in Texas for eighteen years. He returned in 1881 at the request of the foreign mission board and the Creek. During his ministry, he became skilled in the Creek language. With help from Legus Perryman, he translated and transcribed portions of the Bible into Muskogee (Creek), along with hymns and catechisms, assisted by Ann Eliza Robertson. In 1890, Loughridge published an English-Muskogee dictionary with David M. Hodge; it was the first of the Creek language and the only one for nearly a century.

== Early life and education ==
Robert Loughridge was born December 24, 1809, in Lawrenceville, South Carolina, to parents of Scots-Irish ancestry. They valued education and encouraged him to take every opportunity available. When Loughridge was fourteen years old, his family moved to St. Clair County, Alabama, where for seven years he and his brothers worked on the farm. They received formal schooling infrequently, as there were no public schools at the time.

At the age of twenty-one, Loughridge became the assistant teacher at Dr. Beebe's school in Mesopotamia, Alabama for several months. He professed his religious faith at twenty-two, and became a member of the Presbyterian church, under Rev. John H. Gray, D.D. Feeling divinely called to preach the gospel, he immediately started the study of Latin and Greek under his pastor. He later attended the Mesopotamia Academy in Eutaw, Alabama for four years, preparing for college. He entered in the sophomore class in Miami University at Oxford, Ohio. After three years, having taken all the required courses, he graduated in 1837 with a degree of Bachelor of Arts.

He soon entered the Princeton Theological Seminary at Princeton, New Jersey. He stayed a year, returning home after his father died. He studied theology for two more years under his old pastor, Rev. J. H. Gray. Loughridge was licensed to preach by the presbytery council at Tuscaloosa, Alabama on April 9, 1841.

== Beginning ministry ==
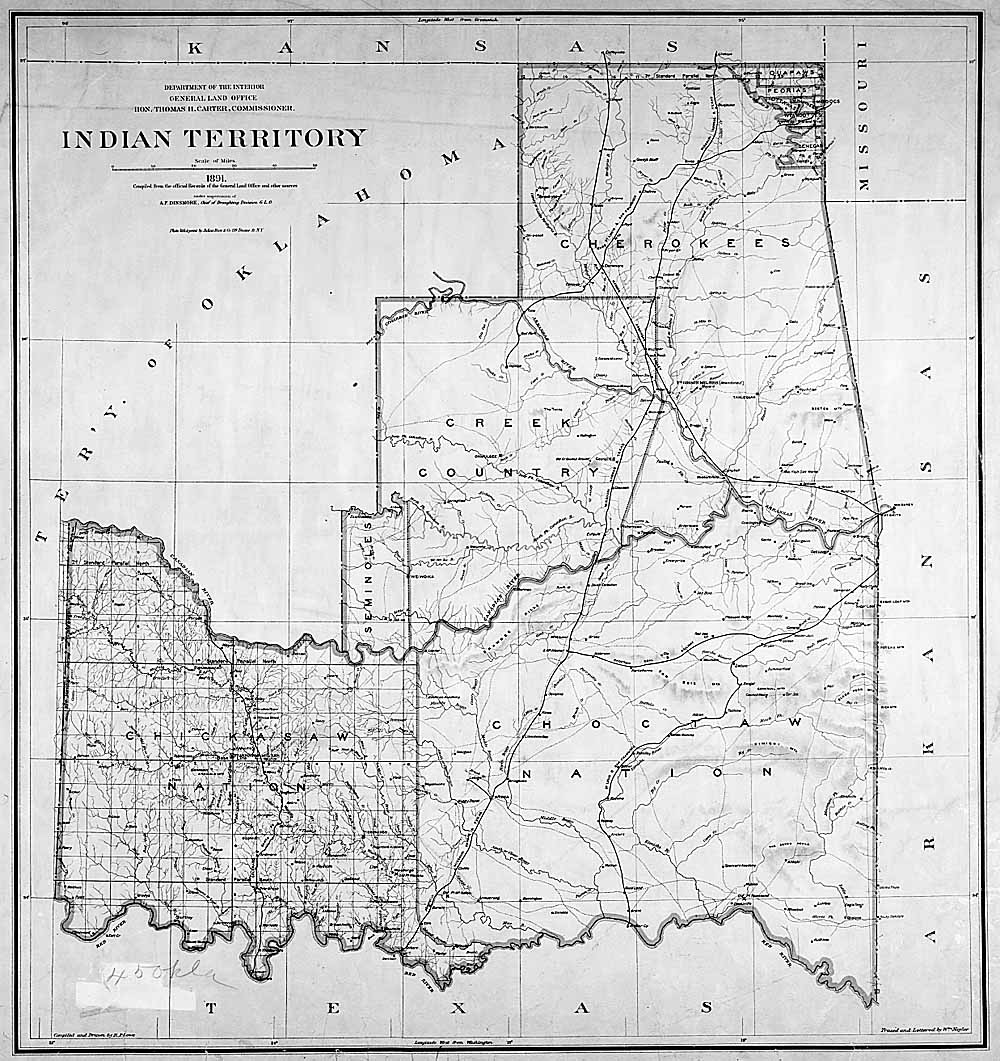
Indian Territory, present-day Oklahoma

In agreement with a call from three vacant churches of Oxford, Paynesville and Elizabeth, Alabama, Loughridge preached six months. Soon afterward, he was appointed by the Presbyterian board for foreign missions to visit the Creek in their territory west of Arkansas, to find out whether they would allow a preaching and mission school on their lands. Loughridge set out on horse-back, November 2, 1841, from Eutaw, and rode about six hundred miles. On December 6 he met the chiefs of the Creek (Muskogee) Nation, and brought this matter before them.

Loughridge had to wait about three weeks for the council to meet to consider his proposal. While there he visited several parts of the nation. No other missionaries were operating there. He found only one government school, run by a man who was later found out to be a counterfeiter. After the council met, they told Loughridge that they did not want preaching, because it broke up their old customs, their busks, ball-plays and dances; but they did want him to establish a school. He said that he was a preacher and would not help unless he could preach. After a long conference, the council agreed to let him preach at the school house, but nowhere else. Loughridge agreed to these terms; and returned to Alabama by horse to prepare for the move to Indian Territory. He returned by steamer up the Arkansas River with his wife Olivia; they reached the Verdigris landing, February 5, 1843.

Loughridge's wife, Olivia, also served as a teacher at the Koweta Mission which he founded. She bore two sons before dying in 1845. The following year Loughridge married Mary, a teacher at the Park Hill school.

== Koweta Mission ==
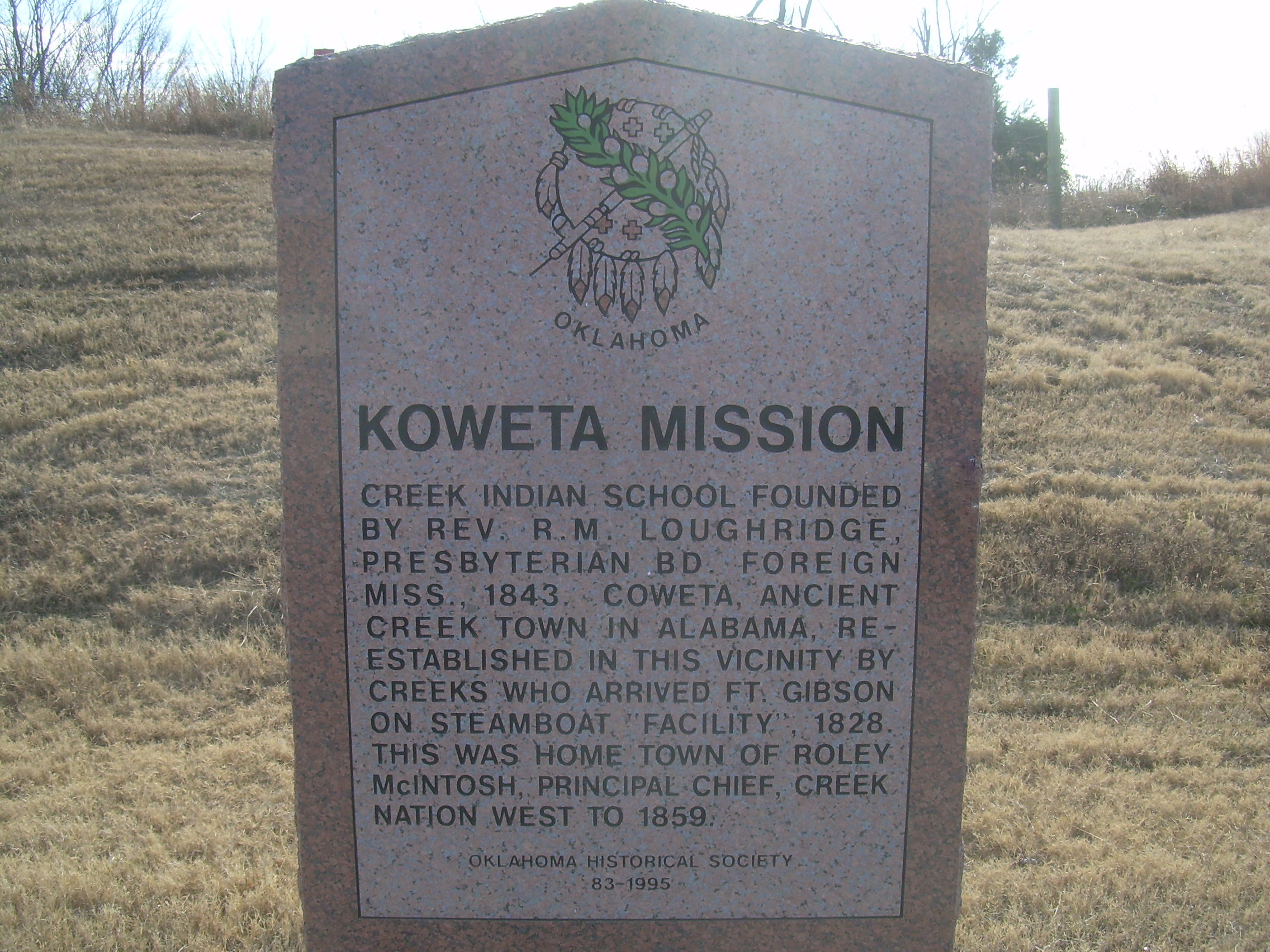
Koweta Mission Historical Marker, in Coweta, Oklahoma

After a few days of observation at his new home in Indian Territory, Loughridge bought a horse and saddle, and set out to find the most appropriate place for the mission; at the suggestion of the principal chief, it was located in the area of present-day Coweta.

As he described in a letter to the US Indian agent, Loughridge bought a vacant Indian cabin of 14x24 feet; it had a dirt floor and covered with clapboards. It was located on a small unfenced field and had a few fruit trees. He paid the owner ten dollars, and named it "Koweta". The Mission was situated near Coweta, one and one-half miles east of the Arkansas River, and twenty-four miles northwest of Fort Gibson. Soon he had built a larger cabin for school and church purposes. He invited the people to attend church, and to send their children to school; fifteen or twenty children were enrolled. His wife, an experienced teacher, began teaching classes. Initially few Creek attended Loughridge's preaching. They were devoted to their own culture and religion.

He was discouraged at the beginning, saying it was "a day of small things;" the people were very friendly, but shy, and seemed afraid to attend preaching. During the following year, Loughridge built a large, hewed-log house. At the request of parents who lived distant from the mission, he and his wife agreed to take in eight or ten children, boys and girls, to live with them in order to attend school. This is considered the beginning of manual labor boarding schools, thought to be effective in "civilizing and Christianizing" the Indian youth. Gradually, the number of boarding students increased to forty. The Creek adults began to attendpreaching more regularly and some converted to Presbyterianism. In about two years Loughridge organized a church.

== Tullahassee Mission ==
Tullahassee Mission 1st Floor

Tullahassee Mission 2nd and 3rd Floors

The Seminole, who spoke the same Muskogee language as the Creek, did not have any schools or churches. The Board of Foreign Missions directed Loughridge to visit them and see whether they would allow a mission and school. In the summer of 1846, he visited them with his interpreter, and learned that the most of their chiefs were willing to have schools and allow preaching in their nation.

In April 1847, Hon. Walter Lowrie, secretary of the board of foreign missions, New York, visited the mission. He entered into an agreement with the chiefs to enlarge the Koweta Mission, and to establish the Tullahassee Mission, to accommodate eighty students, forty boys and forty girls. The schools were funded both by the Presbyterian Church and the Creek school fund.

A large brick building, three stories high, was erected for the Tullahassee school. It contained separate dormitories for boys and girls. It was located on a ridge, in the Arkansas district, one and a-half miles north of the Arkansas River. Rev. H. Balentine was sent by the board to take over (with other missionaries) the Koweta Mission, while Loughridge was appointed as superintendent of the Tullahassee Mission.

As a result of his transfer, he moved to Tullahassee to supervise the construction of the building and other preparations before opening the school. William S. Robertson, A. M. of New York, was appointed as principal teacher, and other assistant teachers were sent by the board. On March 1, 1850, the school opened.

In addition to the main building, there were out-buildings, stables, corn-cribs, fences, etc.; cattle, horses, wagons, and teams were all purchased; furniture for the building, and all kinds of supplies, books, papers, etc. had been provided. The school opened with thirty students, both boys and girls. The mission's full number of eighty was not reached until the fall. Loughridge and Robertson thought it better to start with fewer students, and give the teachers experience before more arrived. The school had a large bell that was donated by the mission board. It hung in the cupola of the building, and was used to mark a range of different activities at the school and the church. Dr. Wells from Fort Gibson donated a weather vane designed as an Indian standing with a bow and arrow.

A number of well-qualified teachers and assistants came from time to time, as Loughridge wanted the best staff for the school. The students' exercises were conducted on the manual labor plan, and six hours each day were spent studying.

The students also did chores for two hours each day: the boys worked on the farm, in the garden or chopped firewood, while the girls did household duties, assisted with sewing, cooking and washing, and took care of the dining room. The students were provided with three meals a day, and were given plenty of time to sleep and play. Religious study was required, including church on Sunday and praying each morning and evening daily. Every night at dinner, along with singing and praying, every student had to recite a verse, or part of a verse, of Scripture from the Bible.

The school was well maintained and fully equipped all of the time, "self-denying, devoted teachers and assistants, worked faithfully and cheerfully, and were content with salaries of only $100 per year".

== Mission closings ==
The Tullahassee Mission continued to grow and do a job in educating the children of the Creek Nation until July 10, 1861, when it was suddenly closed due to the outbreak of the Civil War. All of the mission property, (which amounted to $12,270 in 1861), was taken possession by the chiefs of the nation. The same thing happened with the Koweta Mission. The Creek children were sent back to their homes, while the dedicated teachers took a mournful leave of each other and went back to their homes in the Northern and Southern parts of the country.

After eleven years of successful operation, both of the Missions were abandoned. The Koweta mission was never re opened; but towards the end of the Civil War, November 1866, one of the former teachers, Rev. William S. Robertson (who was ordained an evangelist during the war), was sent out by the board, along with others, and revived the school to something like its former size and usefulness in March 1868 after relentless hours of work. The school continued in operation, doing good work in educating many of the Creek children, for twelve more years until December 19, 1880 when, from a defective flue in the chimney, the building caught fire and was burned to the ground; almost all of its contents were consumed.

== Later ministry ==
During the time the Tullahassee Mission was broken up, in 1861 Loughridge moved his family East into the Cherokee Nation, and preached to the churches there for one year. Other missionaries had already left the territory because of the outbreak of war. Members of both the Creek and Cherokee peoples were divided on the war question; but the majority allied with the South. The Cherokee principal chief and his party were allied with the North but other Cherokee fought on behalf of the Confederacy.

Loughridge and his family felt increasingly at risk in the territory. On July 17, 1862, the family packed their belongings in two small wagons, and went south to Texas. Most of his relatives were already living there. During the war and for the next eighteen years, Loughridge worked as a preacher in different parts of the state. His wife worked as a teacher in several different schools during this period. With their efforts, they could provide for their children's education, as public school was limited.

A page from Loughridge's Dictionary

== Return to Indian Territory ==
Loughridge received a word from the board of foreign missions, and also from several of the prominent Indians, wanting him to return and continue mission work among the Creeks. Loughridge decided that he would return along with his wife on January 5, 1881. He began preaching for the Wealaka church, in the Broken Arrow district; during the two years that he preached in this district, ten people joined the church, and twenty-eight children of believing parents were baptized.

After the Tallahassee Mission was burned, the council decided to rebuild and on a bigger scale, and to locate it further west, where more of the Creek people lived. The trustees selected a beautiful site on the south side of the Arkansas River, surrounded in the distance by several grand old mountains. Named for a nearby Creek town, it would be known as Wealaka Mission. A large and magnificent brick building, 110 feet (34 m) x 4242 feet (13 m) and three stories high, was erected and was soon occupied by 100 children who were boarded and taught there. Having been appointed superintendent of the school, Loughridge opened it on November 1, 1882, and continued in charge for two years before he resigned from his position. After his two years at the Mission he began to preach in different places in the Creek Nation. Loughridge preached the first sermon in downtown Tulsa, Oklahoma in 1883, standing on the front porch of a local store and in 1907 Loughridge founded and built the First Presbyterian Church of Coweta, which is now a museum and listed on the National Register of Historic Places list. He also translated books in the Creek language. The books prepared and published by Loughridge, with the assistance of his interpreter, were a hymn book, a catechism, translation of the Gospel of Matthew, a treatise on baptism, and a dictionary in two parts, Creek and English, and English and Creek. In honor and memory of Loughridge's efforts in the Indian Territory, Camp Parthenia in Tulsa, Oklahoma was renamed Camp Loughridge in 1959.

== Final years ==
Toward the end of his life Loughridge was still loyal to his Christian beliefs. In 1881 during an autobiographical sketch of his life Loughridge wrote, "…during my long pilgrimage of nearly eighty-two years, many have been the afflictions I have been called to bear. Three of my six children have passed over the Jordan of death, and I am now living with my third wife, who is seventy-three years of age. But in all these bereavements, we are comforted with the assurance that all the dear ones thus taken away, are safely housed in their Heavenly home, where we shall meet again, and be forever with the Lord".

On June 26, 1886, Loughridge was honored by his alma mater, Miami University, which conferred upon him the honorary degree of Doctor of Divinity. Robert McGill Loughridge spent his last years in Waco, Texas, where he died on July 8, 1900.
