= Indian Normal School =

Indian Normal School may refer to:

- Indian Normal School of Robeson County, a predecessor of University of North Carolina at Pembroke
- St. Joseph Indian Normal School
- Indian Female Normal School and Instruction Society, former name for International Service Fellowship
- United States Indian Training and Normal School, a former name for Chemawa Indian School
