= Benjamin Perryman =

Chief Benjamin Perryman
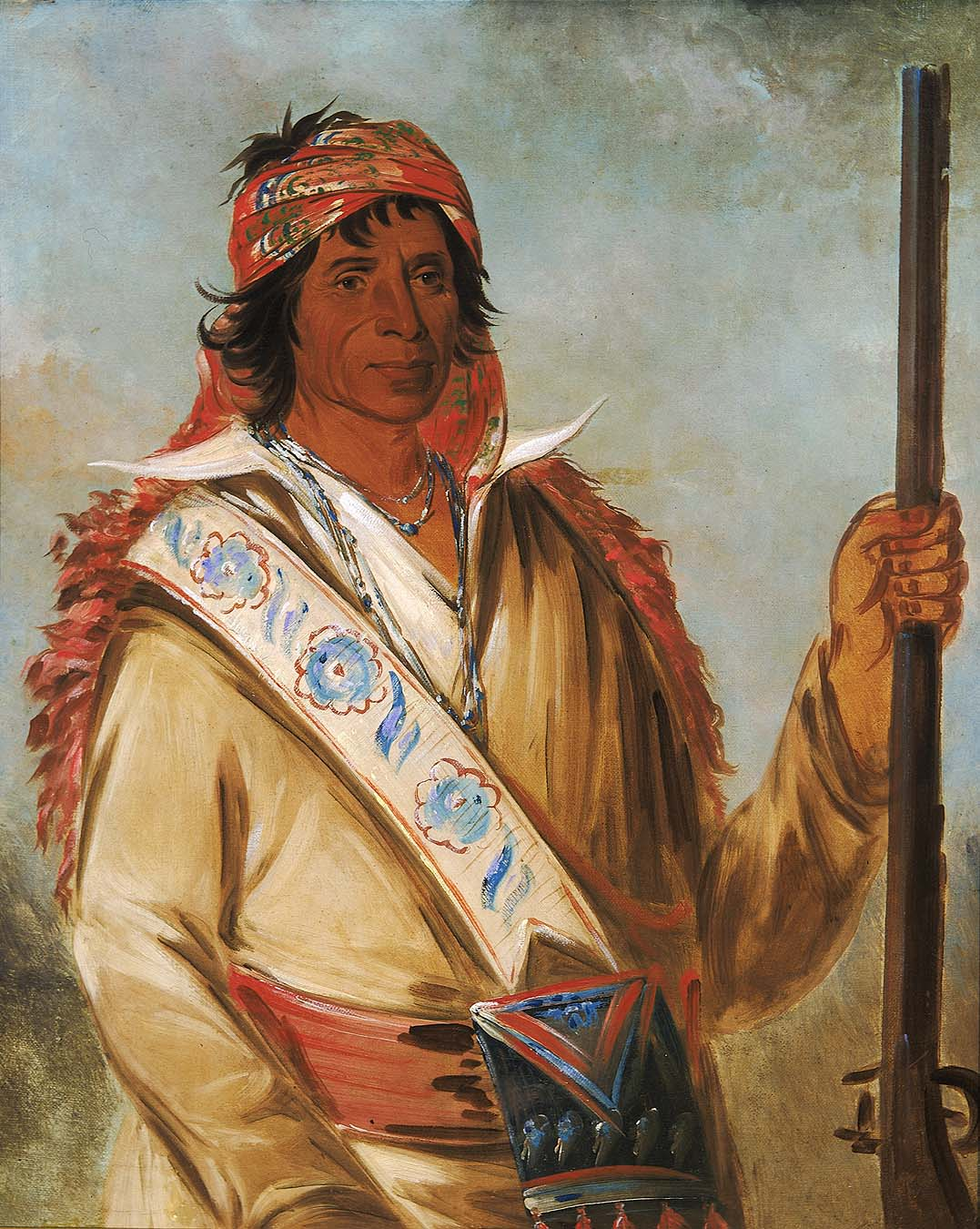
- Born: Creek Confederacy
- Occupation(s): Tribal leader, Creek Nation

Benjamin Perryman (Steek-cha-ko-me-co) was a tribal town chief of some prominence among the Muscogee people in Alabama and was a pronounced adherent of the William McIntosh faction in Creek tribal affairs. He is noted as a signer of the Treaty of February 24, 1833 at Fort Gibson with the Government and, with Roley McIntosh, represented the Creeks at an intertribal conference with the western tribes which opened at Fort Gibson on September 2, 1834 and in these proceedings took an engaging part.

== Ancestry ==
Benjamin Perryman was said to be the son of Theodore Perryman, a European-American man. Perryman's mother was Muscogee Creek. As such, Chief Perryman was a mix-blooded Indian. He had a brother named Sam Perryman, though it is not known if they had the same mother. Sam Perryman was also Creek. In matrilineal Creek society, in which paternity is much less important, they were automatically accepted as members of the Creek nation.

== Prominent descendants ==
Among his many noted descendants are David McKellop Hodge, Albert Pike McKellop, film actress Marla Shelton, Matt Taylor, a modern-day published astro photographer, and Pleasant Porter.
