= David McKellop Hodge =

American politician (1841–1920)

- Born: April 1841; Choska, Indian Territory, U.S.
- Died: Dec 13, 1920 in Tulsa, Oklahoma (aged 79)
- Occupation: Politician

David McKellop Hodge (1841–1920, Creek) was an attorney and interpreter for the Creek Nation, and was politically active. He became an orator and a leader on the Creek Nation Council at Muskogee, the capital.

Born in Choska, Creek Nation, Indian Territory (near present-day Coweta in present-day Wagoner County, Oklahoma). Son of a white man and a Creek woman, he was raised in the matrilineal Creek culture, learning both Creek and English languages. He became involved with Creek Nation politics, and was licensed to practice law in the Creek Nation; he was recorded as "David M. Hodge" on legal documentation. He was buried at Oaklawn Cemetery in Tulsa, Oklahoma.

== Ancestry ==
David M. Hodge was the son of Nathanel Hodge, European-American, and Nancy McKellop (Creek), who had mixed ancestry. Her parents were David McKellop, an 1810 immigrant from Scotland, and his wife Susan (Perryman) McKellop. She was the daughter of Chief Perryman and his wife. Because the Creek had a matrilineal kinship system, Hodge was considered to belong to his mother's people, and through her family, he belonged to the Aktayace clan. According to the 1882 Creek Census, he belonged to Big Spring Tribal Town (he was listed as D.M. Hodge). Hodge married Susan Yargee, daughter of John Yargee; one of the founders of Red Fork, OK.

== Career ==
Many Creek allied with the Confederacy during the American Civil War. Its leaders had promised the Creek and other nations in Indian Territory a state under Native American control if they won the war. Hodge is listed as a member of Company Company H, lst Creek Cavalry Regiment, Indian Territory, C.S.A., fighting under the "Cherokee Braves" flag.

Having been educated before the war in Presbyterian mission schools in the Creek Nation, he was appointed to write the Creek Constitution of 1868. He often served as clerk of the Creek National Council, and was appointed to several delegations that the Creek Nation sent to Washington, D.C. to negotiate with the federal government, including peace terms for the a new treaty after the war. He later negotiated terms of the original allowances of the Curtis Act of 1898.

In 1897, Creek Principal Chief Isparhecker appointed Hodge to serve on a committee to negotiate with the Dawes Commission for Creek rights in allocation of communal lands. He also represented the Creek Nation in Washington, D.C., before Congressional committees and the Courts.

In 1905, he was appointed a delegate to represent the Creek Tribal Town Broken Arrow at the Sequoyah Convention in Muskogee. This was an effort by several Indian nations in the territory to establish a state under Native American control, as pressure was increasing to admit the territories as a state after extinguishing Indian land rights. Hodge was a member of the convention's Committee of Three, which assisted the chairman in appointing subcommittees. The other members of the committee included Charles N. Haskell and Robert L. Owen.

Hodge is also credited with translating parts of the Bible into the Creek language. He collaborated with Presbyterian missionary Robert McGill Loughridge to complete and publish the English and Muskogee Dictionary, in 1890. It was the first created for that language and the only one for nearly a century.

He helped establish the Loughridge Memorial Presbyterian Church, now known as White Church, on the Creek Nation. He also aided development of a private school, supported by subscription by students' families, that was based in the church building from 1870-1900.

Hodge died in 1920. He is buried in Oaklawn Cemetery at Tulsa, Oklahoma.
