= David Hodges (disambiguation) =

David Hodges (born 1978) is an American musician.

David Hodges may also refer to:

- David A. Hodges (1937–2022), American electrical engineer
- David Hodges (CSI), a character from the television series CSI: Crime Scene Investigation
- Dave Hodges (rugby union) (born 1968), American rugby union coach
- David Hodges (footballer) (born 1970), English footballer

== See also ==
- David Hodge (disambiguation)
- David U. Hoges, American actor who appears in The Fugitive
