= St. Joseph Indian Normal School =

- U.S. National Register of Historic Places
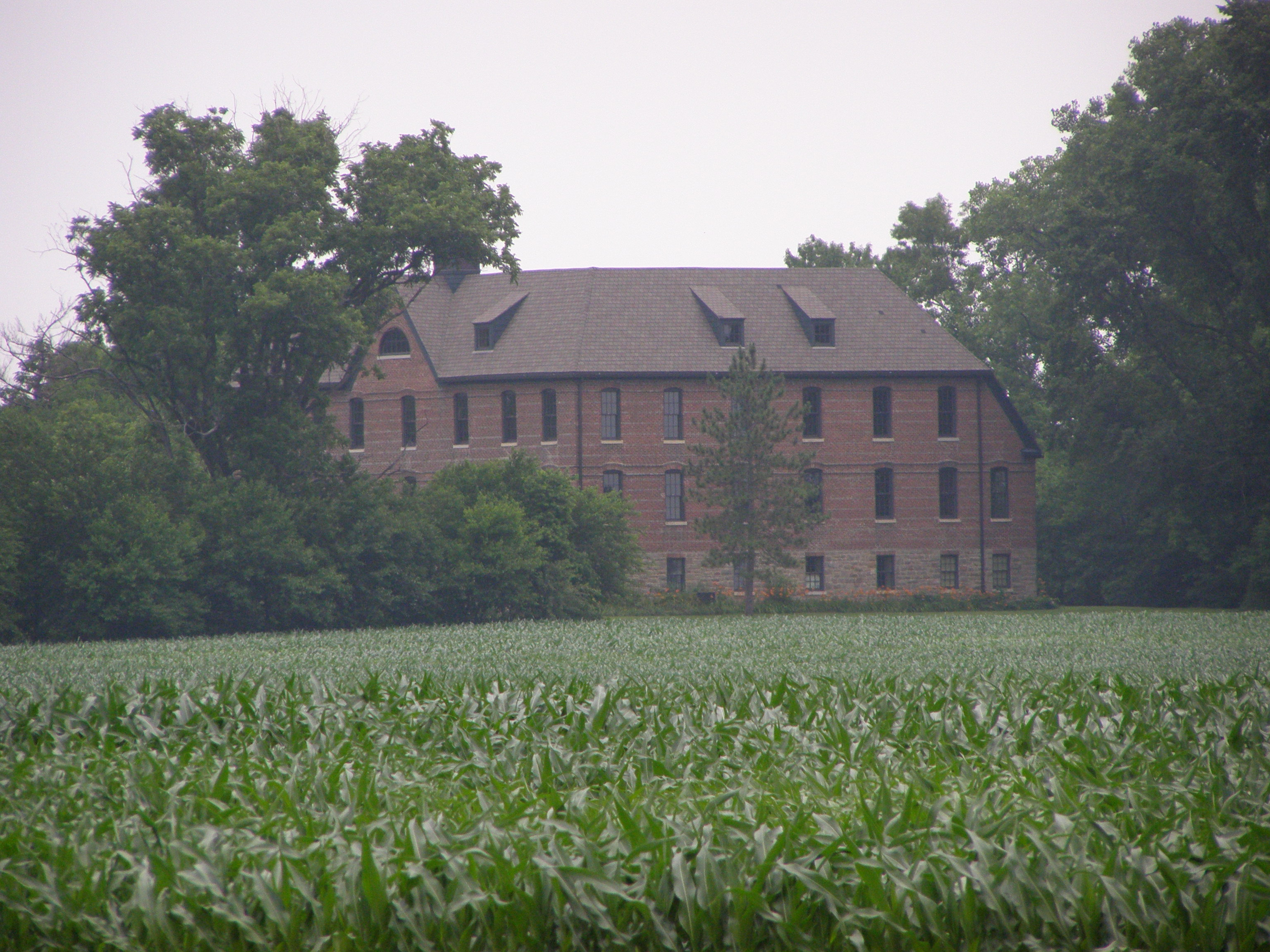

- Location within Indiana Location within the United States
- Location: St. Joseph's College Campus off U.S. Route 231, Rensselaer, Indiana
- Coordinates: 40°55′17″N 87°9′4″W
- Area: less than one acre
- Built: 1888
- NRHP reference No.: 73000018
- Added to NRHP: June 19, 1973

St. Joseph's Indian Normal School is a former school for American Indians in Rensselaer, Indiana. The school building is now known as Drexel Hall and part of the Saint Joseph's College campus. The school lasted from 1888 to 1896 and was funded by the U.S. government and Catholic missionaries. Established by the Catholic Indian Missions with funding from St. Katharine Drexel, the school taught 60 Indian children. The Society of Precious Blood operated the school during its years of operation. The students were all boys. When the Indian School was closed, the building was named Drexel Hall. It is one of the first structures of Saint Joseph's College.

The Indian school was essentially a red brick structure with the ground floor surrounded with a sandstone wall. It was built in a square, 80 feet (24 m) on each side. The square courtyard in the center, it being around 30 feet (9.1 m) on each side. Each wing had four floors with the east wing only three floors high. The roof was red tiles. The main entrance was on the west. It was owned by the Bureau of Catholic Indian Missions in Washington, D.C. Its architecture would later serve as an inspiration for the St. Boniface Indian School in California.

It was a boarding school for Indian boys with space for 70 boys, their classrooms, playroom, dormitory, kitchen, a small chapel, rooms for the superintendent and a teacher or two and for around six Sisters (nuns) who ran the kitchen. An inspector's report said there were 29 rooms in all. Although the building served as an Indian school for only eight years (1888–1896), it was not changed or altered until 1937 when it was remodeled to serve as a residence hall for Saint Joseph's College. Only the bell tower was removed along with the shutters from the windows. On the inside, it was altered. The courtyard was made smaller to allow an extra row of rooms. Drexel Hall later housed some offices of Saint Joseph's College, before and after the college announced a suspension of operations in 2017.

== History ==
Father Joseph Stephan, the Director of the Bureau of Catholic Indian Missions, wrote to Katharine Drexel on December 8, 1887, to suggest opening a mission school in Indiana. Later letters exchanged in March 1888 show the two discussing building plans and government contracts to support the school. Katharine Drexel would provide approximately $50,000 towards the purchase of land and construction of Saint Joseph's. The land for the school was previously part of the land that made up the former orphanage operated by the Diocese of Fort Wayne known as Spitler Farm. Stephan's motives for the school were strongly religious, seeking to establish a network of Catholic schools to compete with the growing influence of Protestant Indian mission schools at the time. Mission schools were used as a tool to gain more converts, as they provided not only practical skills but religious education in their respective faiths as well. Pupils were also educated in the hopes that they would return home and convert other members of their tribe.

The first group of students, all boys who were "obtained," came in 1888. The school opened in September, initially headed by Father George Willard, then vice-director of the Bureau of Catholic Indian Missions, until the Society of the Precious Blood based in Carthagena, Ohio took over the management, an arrangement which would continue until its closure.

Pupils and teaching methods from St. Joseph were exhibited at the Chicago World's Fair in 1893 along with several other American Indian schools. St. Joseph was the only Catholic school represented. For two weeks in June, a group of Native Americans were also invited to camp out next to the World's Fair building in teepees and war paint in order to contrast "uncivilized" natives versus the "civilized" students to visitors. Author Carolyn Weber argues that the exhibition played into St. Joseph's mission as an Indian boarding school of using education to assimilate the students and reinforce American cultural dominance.

Waning government support for contract schools negatively affected St. Joseph. In September 1895, the school was forced to collect 40 students without any government funding, relying on donations from Drexel to support filling its quota. Federal funding was withdrawn in 1895 over St. Joseph's expensive travel costs. The high costs were due to the school's considerable distance from the Indian reservations where its pool of students were pulled from. St. Joseph operated for a year on private funding, but closed due to financial difficulties in 1896.

After its closure in 1896, the building for a while became home to a printing press and was known as the Collegeville Printing Plant. It was also sometimes known as the Messenger Printing Plant, due to the Catholic monthly devotional magazine Messenger of the Spiritual Benevolent Fraternity (parallel German editions were printed under the name der Botschafter des Deutschen Wohltaetigkeits Vereins) being printed there until 1922. Other papers printed, edited, and published there were the Young Crusader and the St. Joseph's Collegian.

From 1922 to 1937, Saint Joseph's College took over the land and continued operating the farm while using the building as a storehouse. Upon the college's expansion into a four-year institution in the fall of 1937, the building was remodeled into student dormitories and renamed Drexel Hall. Dormitory use stopped in 1978. The building's use was irregular, from 1944 to 1974 becoming temporary housing for the Chicago Bears football team during summer training camps at Saint Joseph's College. By 1999, the building was included on the Indiana Landmarks Ten Most Endangered Structures list. A $500,000 federal grant was issued to Saint Joseph's College in 2002 for repairs to stabilize of the exterior of the dorms. The Indiana Chamber of Commerce awarded an additional $375,000 as part of the Community Focus Fund to remodel Drexel Hall into the Rensselaer Adult Learning Center in 2004.

== Religious factors ==
Stephan's motives for the school were strongly religious, seeking to establish a network of Catholic schools to compete with the growing influence of Protestant Indian mission schools at the time. Mission schools were used as a tool to gain more converts, as they provided not only practical skills but religious education in their respective faiths as well. Pupils were also educated in the hopes that they would return home and convert other members of their tribe. St. Joseph's was founded with the intention of acting as a central normal Indian school within a larger network of other similar Catholic contract schools. In Indian territories Catholics and Protestants competed fiercely for student recruits, with both sides accusing the other of using illegal methods, corruption, and coercion during the recruitment process.

Religious divisions existed between both Catholic and Protestants as well as between different Catholic sects competing for territory and influence. During discussions between Stephan and the Society of the Precious Blood over management of the school, Provincial Henry Drees strongly opposed inviting the Benedictines into an area that the Society had already settled. His protests in letters to George Willard ensured the area was left under the sole jurisdiction of the Society of the Precious Blood.

Constant tensions between Catholic institutions and the U.S. Government would complicate St. Joseph's history and eventually lead to its closure. The number of contract school agencies allotted to a religious order was to be decided based on their history of mission work. Out of 13 denominations operating 73 agencies, Catholics were allotted only 7 agencies, despite the Church's extensive history operating missions. Further problems began after the contract school system lost support from President Grover Cleveland when Benjamin Harrison took office. Harrison appointed Protestant clergymen Thomas J. Morgan and Daniel Dorchester as the Commissioner of Indian Affairs and Superintendent of Indian Education. Father Stephan would aggressively advocate for the existing contract schools, going on to claim nearly two-thirds of all money for contract schools in 1892. Eighteen Catholic contract schools received $39,175 in 1883, and Stephan's efforts increased this amount to $395,756 for sixty schools in 1892. This monopolization turned Protestants against the contract school system, and instead they began favoring strictly government-ran schools.

== Curriculum ==
The daily work of the students involved plenty of manual labor, with a curriculum pamphlet advertising a work day of more than twelve hours. An inspector wrote of the boys as "doing more manual labor than in any other Catholic school of my acquaintance." Daily chores included hoeing weeds, chopping wood, tending to livestock, harvesting crops, stacking hay, and shucking corn in work gangs. The Saint Joseph curriculum stressed religion and patriotism and was centered around industrial training for trades like farming, tailoring, and carpentry. Education included "practical hygiene" components that steered students towards adherence to Eurocentric grooming and manners.

Catholic texts used at St. Joseph's tended to be more sympathetic to Native Americans and their mistreatment. A Catholic history textbook by John Hassard used at the school explicitly notes the cruelty of the conquistadors towards Natives. Some secular books used, such as Calvin Townsend's Course of Civil Government, disparaged the Native American way of life before colonization and described them in terms like "savage" and "uncultivated". Books with anti-Indian views were introduced later in the curriculum, reflecting the school's willingness to eventually utilize similar assimilation techniques to those seen at Carlisle Indian Industrial School, which St. Joseph's was modeled after.

Athletics were a popular extracurricular activity. The pupils of St. Joseph's were noted to excel at sports, especially baseball. The name of the school sports team was the Young Americans. Another notable extracurricular activity was traditional Native dance. Students would on occasion dress in their tribal clothing and perform for spectators to raise money for the school through the sale of souvenirs. This was noted by staff at the school to be counter-productive in their "civilizing" mission, but effective at raising morale in the boys.

The academic year closed with a final examination and commencement ceremonies that were open to the public. Local newspapers advertised these ceremonies, which included songs, entertainment, and a religious service in the evening.

=== Religion ===
St. Joseph's was the only off-reservation Catholic contract school. Catholic instruction was mandated, and Latin was offered as a language option for study at pupils' request. Every day, students attended Mass and studied the Catechism in religious classes. The goal of St. Joseph's was to integrate students into American Catholic society. The replacement of Native religion with Catholicism was an important part of the assimilation process, and instructors at the school believed religious training was equally as important as Americanization.

=== Farming ===
The 400-acre (160 ha) farm attached to the school doubled as an important source of income. Superintendent reports indicated the farm grossed around $3,000 annually. Produce sales could offset gaps in the per-pupil subsidies when attendance dropped and subsidies were reduced. The school farm included a chicken coop and pigpens built by the students, a large barn, and corn cribs. The 1892 report to the Commissioner of Indian Affairs recorded an output of "600 bushels of wheat, 150 bushels of rye, 100 bushels of oats, 1500 bushels of corn, and 200 bushels of potatoes, plus garden vegietables [sic]". Livestock was provided for students to raise as well; animals on the farm included cattle, sheep, pigs, horses, and poultry that lived on the 200 acres (81 ha) of the farm not used for growing crops. Instilling European-style farming methods was an important part of the curriculum, as most students were expected to return home and become farmers on their reservations.

=== Industry ===
St. Joseph's industrial training program was graded by an inspector to be satisfactory to state standards at the time, which outpaced many Catholic Indian schools that tended to under perform in industry. Students would learn trades under the direction of a school employee. The list of trades offered by the school expanded from just carpentry and shoemaking in 1889 with the addition of new blacksmithing and tailoring shops by 1891. Desks and benches for the school and farm were built by students within these shops. Practical knowledge of tasks like shoeing horses, erecting houses, and constructing wagons was intended to be taken home by students and used on the reservations. Despite these additions, the school lacked instruction in the popular tinsmithing trade that many other comparable boarding schools taught, though the exact reason why is unclear.

== Attendance ==
Problems with student retention occurred throughout the history of St. Joseph's. Many were lost due to homesickness. Some homesick students were sent back upon request, such as at the beginning of the 1891 school year, when superintendent Andrew Gietl had to send back seven boys. Others ran away and attempted to navigate the long distance back to their reservations by themselves, though usually unsuccessfully. Superintendents came up with measures to prevent escape over time, including occasionally keeping students locked inside of the school or recreation areas and requiring coats be returned at night. Teachers would stay in the student dorms at night starting in 1889 to prevent nighttime escapes. Students' homesickness was exacerbated by the school's long distance from reservations; the severing of contact between pupils and the influence of their tribes and traditions was considered an important part of the assimilation process. Another contributor to the high amount of escape attempts was the sheer volume of manual labor required of students.

Only six of the first fifty enrolled students completed the five-year curriculum, and no evidence suggests that other years were markedly more successful. Though runaway incidents decreased after 1893, yearly turnover rates of around fifty percent cost the school a considerable amount of money and hobbled its ability to achieve its intended goals. The height of attendance was in 1892, with 74 students housed.

== Administration ==
List of superintendents:

- George Willard, September 1888 – January 1889
- Anthony Dick, February 1889 – March 1889
- Florian Hahn, March 1889 – August 1890; 1893–1894
- Andrew Gietl, 1890–1893
- Francis Schalk, 1894–1896

== See also ==
- American Indian boarding schools
- Carlisle Indian Industrial School
- Cultural assimilation of Native Americans
- List of Native American boarding schools

== Bibliography ==
- Gerlach, Dominic (March 1, 1973). "Saint Joseph's College, Rensselaer, Indiana". Indiana Magazine of History. 69 (1): 1–43.
- Weber, Carolyn (2013). "Caught Between Catholic and Government Traditions: Americanization and Assimilation at St. Joseph's Indian Normal School". American Educational History Journal. 40: 75–91. doi:10.1108/978-1-62396-423-820251006. ProQuest 1449497148.
- Willging, Eugene P. (January 1, 1962). Catholic serials of the nineteenth century in the United States: Indiana: a descriptive bibliography and union list. Second series, part four. Washington, D.C., U.S.A.: Catholic University of America Press. pp. 6–10.
- Zemanek, Alysha (June 2017). Indiana School Days: Native American Education at St. Joseph's Indian Normal School and White's Manual Labor Institute (Master's thesis). Indiana University.
