= Coweta High School =

Public secondary school in Oklahoma, United States

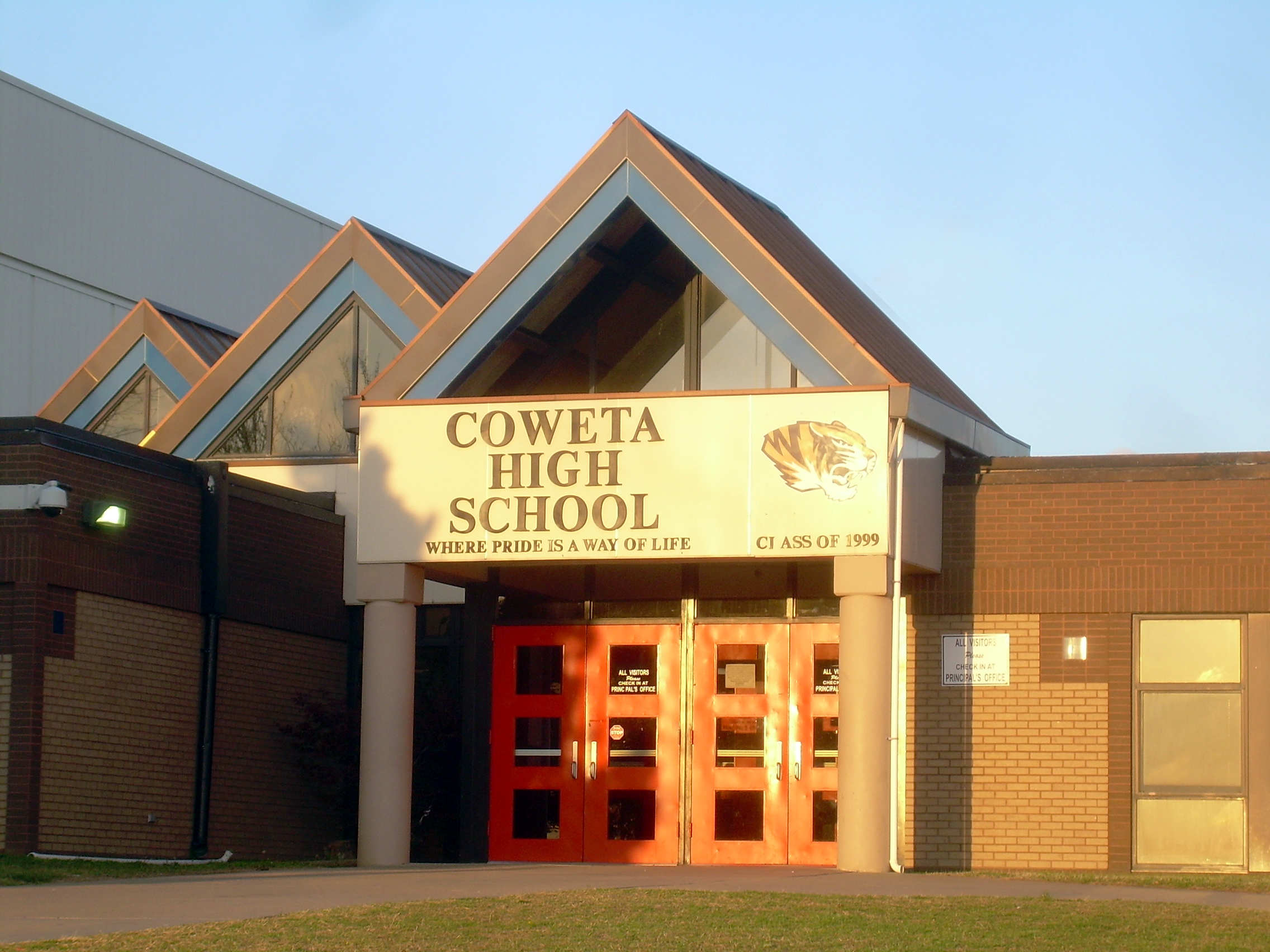

Location
- 14607 S. 305th Street; Coweta, Oklahoma 74429; United States; 35.949881°N 95.636423°W

Information
- Type: Public Secondary
- School district: Coweta School District
- Principal: Gary Ellis
- Staff: 37.68 (FTE)
- Grades: 10-12
- Enrollment: 758 (2023-2024)
- Student to teacher ratio: 20.12
- Colors: Orange and black
- Mascot: Tiger
- Accreditation: Oklahoma State Department of Education
- Website: hs.cowetaps.org

Coweta High School is a public school located in Coweta, Oklahoma, United States, and is accredited by the Oklahoma State Board of Education and the North Central Association of Secondary Schools. This school services grades ten through twelve with approximately 700 students in attendance.

With the core subjects Coweta High School also has elective classes that range from Art to Video Production. Students attending Coweta High school also have the opportunity to go to vocational training through Indian Capital Technology Center in Muskogee, Oklahoma.

== Extracurricular activities ==
=== Athletics ===
The Coweta Tigers have won 10 state championships in their history as recognized by the Oklahoma Secondary Schools Athletic Association.

The following is a list of the sports in which the school competes and the years, if any, during which the school's team won the state championship:

- Baseball - 1 (1999)
- Boys Basketball - 0
- Girls Basketball - 0
- Cheerleading - 0
- Boys Cross Country - 0
- Girls Cross Country - 2 (2010, 2011)
- Football - 0
- Boys Golf - 0
- Girls Golf - 1 (1999)
- Marching Band - 10
- Boys Soccer - 0
- Girls Soccer - 0
- Softball - 3 (2002, 2004, 2005)
- Boys Track - 0
- Girls Track - 0
- Volleyball - 0
- Wrestling - 3 (Team State: 1985, 1993) (Dual State: 2016)

== See also ==
- Coweta Public Schools
