= A. J. Mason Building =

- U.S. National Register of Historic Places
- Location within Oklahoma Location within the United States
- Location: Tullahassee, Oklahoma
- Coordinates: 35°50′20″N 95°26′18″W
- Built: 1912
- NRHP reference No.: 85001743
- Added to NRHP: 8-5-1985

The A. J. Mason Building is a single-story brick building that is the only remaining original structure in Tullahassee, Oklahoma. The building was listed on the National Register of Historic Places August 5, 1985.

The building reportedly housed a grocery store until sometime in the 1950s. It later housed a nightclub.
