= Redbird City Hall =

- Red Bird City Hall
- U.S. National Register of Historic Places
- Location within Oklahoma Location within the United States
- Location: Red Bird, Oklahoma
- Coordinates: 35°53′40″N 95°35′22″W
- Built: 1933
- Architect: J.M. Jackson
- NRHP reference No.: 84003450
- Added to NRHP: September 28, 1984

Red Bird City Hall functioned as the center of local government in the all-black town of Red Bird. In 1932, the town decided to build a city hall which was completed in 1933. The building was listed on the National Register of Historic Places September 28, 1984.
