= David Hodge and Hi-Jin Kang Hodge =

David Hodge and Hi-Jin Kang Hodge are American filmmakers and video artists. They are known for experimental multimedia installations that combine video technology with documentary elements, as well as their feature-length documentary films Life on Wheels and Walk With Me.

== Career and notable works ==
Impermanence: The Time of Man

David Hodge and Hi-Jin Hodge contributed to 'The Missing Peace: Artists Consider the Dalai Lama, a multi-venue exhibition that opened at the UCLA Fowler Museum in 2006. Their contribution, titled 'Impermanence: The Time of Man', is a video installation exploring the concept of change, based on interviews with over 100 individuals. The project originated from the artists' encounter with Tibetan monks creating a sand mandala in Half Moon Bay, California, which led them to explore impermanence as both a personal and universal theme. What began as a few interviews expanded to 122 conversations with people ranging from a maharaja to a Jamaican window washer, a Web master, a 12-year-old boy, a Trappist monk, an ex-gang member, and a Presbyterian minister. The work was displayed using video iPods arranged in a circular installation.

Chicago Tribune art critic Alan Artner praised the Hodge's iPod installation as one of the works that "use their materials most inventively and poetically." It was also described by Sara Wykes in a Mercury News review as, “one of the show’s most popular” artworks, and “an appropriate visual wallop for our gadget-culture weary eyes.”

A companion book, Impermanence: Embracing Change, which was based on the installation, was published by Snow Lion Publications in 2006.

Watertime

In 2007, David and Hi-Jin Hodge created the immersive film Watertime, by filming wave action in the Pacific Ocean from nearby their home in Half Moon Bay at the same time each day for an entire year. The artwork suggests a "meditation on variability, time and change."

Life on Wheels

In 2020, David and Hi-Jin Hodge released the documentary film Life on Wheels, which explores long standing issues and presents new visions regarding urban transportation and mobility. Themes prevalent in the film are automobile dependency and emerging transportation technologies that conceptualize smart city planning and solutions for more accessible mobility in the future. The documentary features interviews with experts and examines how cities and roadway infrastructure impact daily life while exploring the rise of alternative transportation options including scooters and bicycles. The film asks viewers to "seriously rethink the futurescape of transportation" and consider shifting from auto-centric to human-centric urban design. Forbes columnist and AI scientist Lance Eliot describes the documentary as, "a fast-paced, easy-to-view, and thought-provoking analysis of the mobility revolution that is underway," noting the filmmakers' use of "quick video cuts, coupled with shrewdly chosen experts that offer memorable quips and insights about the mobility chores of today and the possible options of greater innovative mobility in the future."

Walk With Me

In 2025, David and Hi-Jin Hodge released Walk With Me, a documentary film that examines the intersection of urban design and pedestrian accessibility. The film addresses how walkable neighborhoods contribute to community health, environmental sustainability, and social connection, while identifying ways that cities can potentially become more walkable. The documentary follows filmmaker David Hodge as he acclimates from a car-reliant American city to a walkable Scandinavian one. On his journey, he connects with a former mayor, a physician, a neuroscientist, urban planners, and a wildlife tracker. Each encounter and experience focuses on the personal, societal, and political impacts of walking and its ability to transform lives.

== Exhibitions ==
David and Hi-Jin Kang Hodge have had their work exhibited in galleries and museums in the United States, Europe and Asia.

Their video installation, Impermanence: The Time of Man was included alongside work by other leading contemporary artists in the exhibition The Missing Peace: Artists Consider the Dalai Lama, which opened at the UCLA Fowler Museum (Los Angeles, California) in 2006. The exhibition traveled to the Loyola University Museum of Art (Chicago, Illinois) and the San Antonio Museum of Art (San Antonio, Texas). Impermanence: The Time of Man was also featured in the Divine Bodies exhibition at the Asian Art Museum (San Francisco, California) in 2018.

In 2012, their video installation, Spinning, was displayed at Fotografiska Stockholm (Stockholm, Sweden).

In 2015, they collaborated on an installation for the Legacy exhibition at the Nobel Prize Museum. Their multimedia installation interpreted the enduring legacy of the Nobel Prize, and its multicultural impact on society, and was based on interviews that the artists made with Nobel Laureates in San Francisco, New York and Stockholm.

== Collections ==
Impermanence: The Time of Man is in the permanent collections at the Asian Art Museum (San Francisco, California) and the RISD Museum (Providence, Rhode Island). Watertime is in the collection of the Fowler Museum at UCLA.

== Awards ==
David and Hi-Jin Kang Hodge's documentary films have received recognition at several international film festivals. Life on Wheels took first place in the Long Format Films category at the Sustainable Stories Film Fest (SSFF) in 2022.

In 2025, Walk With Me won Best International Documentary Short at the Austin International Art Festival and Best Japanese Documentary Film at the Kyoto Independent Film Festival.
