= Wealaka, Indian Territory =

Wealaka (Creek: Ue-Vlakv) was a community established in 1880 in the Creek Nation, Indian Territory. It is notable as the site of Wealaka Mission, which operated a school from 1882-1907. This school was primarily for Muscogee Creek children, but European Americans could attend for a fee. After statehood in 1907, the site was sold to private owners.

The community was the last home of Creek Principal Chief Pleasant Porter (1840-1907). He had called the area "Fairview". While classified today by the U.S. Geological Survey (USGS) as a populated place in southern Tulsa County, Oklahoma, the population of Wealaka is not separately tabulated in the U.S. census.

== Town founding to mid-20th century ==
Wealaka was established about 1880 on a tributary of the Arkansas River, within the territory of the Creek Nation. It was about 2 miles (3.2 km) northwest of present-day Leonard, Oklahoma. The name is a Muskogee language word meaning "Rising Water." W. L. Gilcrease was a European-American merchant who platted the town and chose the name Wealaka. He was also co-owner of a cotton gin. One of his sons was Thomas Gilcrease, who became an oilman in Oklahoma after it was admitted as a state.

The Wealaka post office was founded here and operated in W. T. Davis's store from 1880 to 1892. It was the second post office in the Tulsa vicinity. The Davis store building was razed in 1942 to make way for a landing field for Spartan School of Aeronautics.

== Wealaka Mission ==
Wealaka Creek Mission was founded here in 1882 by Robert McGill Loughridge, a Presbyterian minister who had been serving as a missionary in the Creek Nation since 1873. That year he had founded Koweta Mission in Coweta, Creek Nation. Wealaka Mission also operated a school for Muscogee children in the area, who attended for free. Their costs were covered by the federal government. Area European-American children were allowed to study here, for a fee of $1.00 per month.

Lilah Denton Lindsey Creek was one of the early teachers at the mission and later known as a philanthropist. According to a 1937 interview, she said the mission was located on top of a hill about 40 miles (64 km) northwest of Muskogee and 0.5 miles (0.80 km) south of the Arkansas River. The first building was brick, three stories high, and was 110 feet (34 m) by 40 feet (12 m). The principal and teachers were housed on the first floor, the chapel and school classrooms were on the second floor, and the third floor was divided into separate dormitories for boys and girls. Many children came to the school from a distance and needed to board here.

Pleasant Porter (1840-1907), the last elected principal chief of the Creek Nation before statehood, had his home near the mission. He was buried in the mission cemetery.

After Oklahoma gained statehood in 1907, the mission property was sold to private owners. The school building burned down in 1935. Only the basement and cemetery remain.
