= First Presbyterian Church (Coweta, Oklahoma) =

Historic church in Oklahoma, United States

- First Presbyterian Church of Coweta
- U.S. National Register of Historic Places
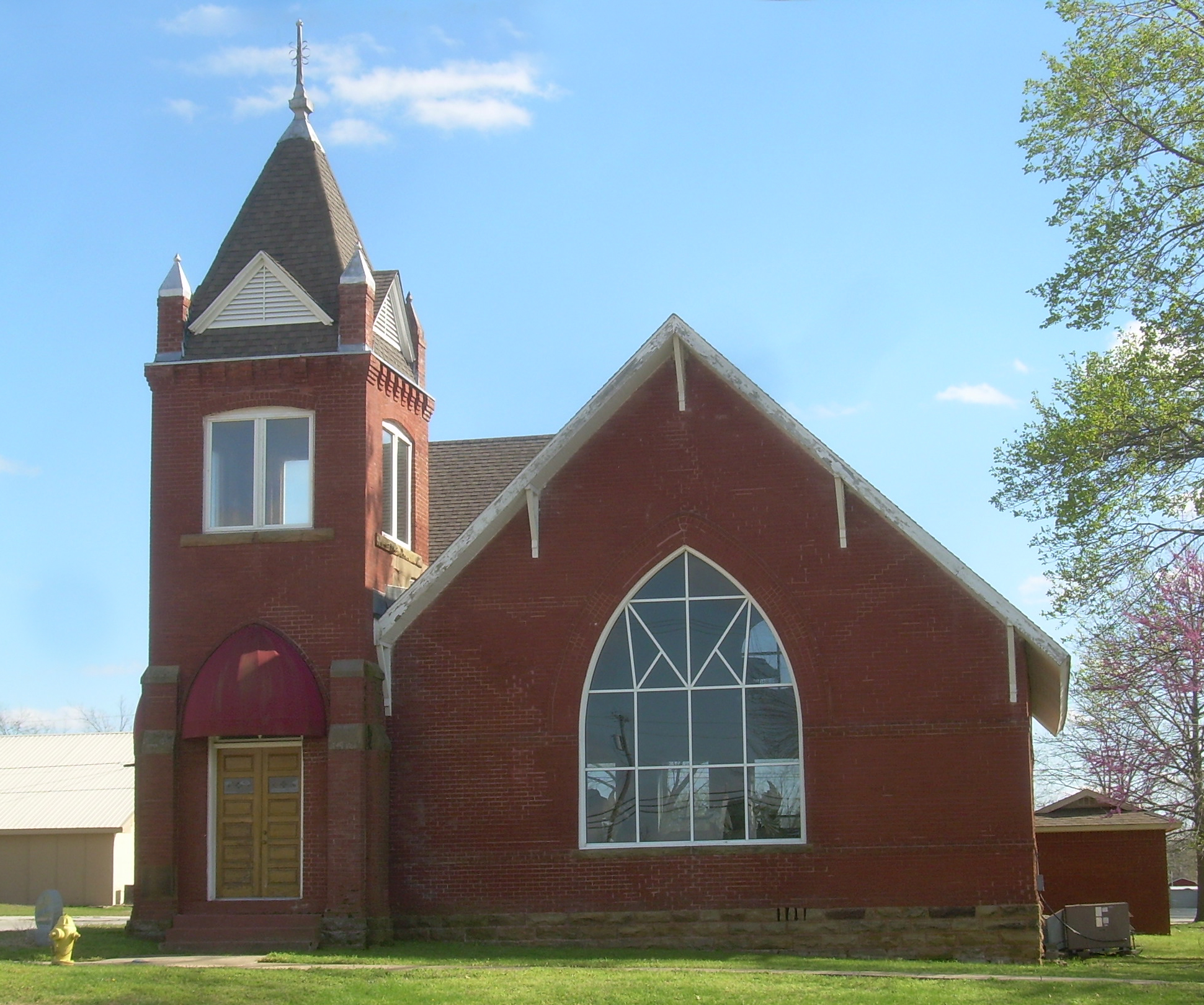
- Also known as the Mission Bell Museum.
- Location: 120 E. Sycamore St., Coweta, Oklahoma
- Coordinates: 35°57′47″N 95°39′42″W
- Built: 1907
- Architectural style: Late Gothic Revival
- NRHP reference No.: 03000099
- Added to NRHP: March 7, 2003

The First Presbyterian Church was built in 1907 and is located just one block west of the current downtown business district in Coweta, Oklahoma. The building was added to the National Register of Historic Places listings in Wagoner County, Oklahoma in 2003.

== History ==
The First Presbyterian Church was built in 1907 in a late Gothic Revival style. By 1908, the building was closed due to the roof falling inward. However, the roof was fixed and a year later it was re-opened. By 1918, there were 34 members of the church. Around the 1950s-60s, the church was closed and abandoned. The building is no longer used as a church, and in 1972, it became the Mission Bell Museum. The building, now event space, is home to the original historic chandelier and 10 of the original 32 pews.

The chandelier in the center of the room was reportedly brought by boat down the Ohio and Mississippi Rivers and up the Arkansas River in the spring of 1907. Supposedly, the whole town turned out to meet the boat when it arrived at Coweta landing. The chandelier has since been wired, and rewired, for electricity.
