= Coweta Public Schools =

School district in Oklahoma, U.S.

Coweta Tigers Logo

Coweta Public School District also known as Coweta Public Schools it is the 29th largest school district in the state of Oklahoma.

As of October 2007 the district had 3,161 pre kindergarten through 12th grade students enrolled in 8 different schools, the district is also the largest in Wagoner County.

== List of schools ==
Grades 10-12 are considered High Schools, grades 7-9 are considered Junior High, and grades pre-K through 6th are considered Elementary.

=== Secondary schools ===
==== High schools ====
- Coweta High School

==== Junior high schools ====
- Donald P. Sloat Junior High
- Intermediate High School

=== Elementary schools ===
- Mission Intermediate Grade Center
- Heritage Intermediate Grade Center
- Central Elementary
- Northwest Elementary
- Southside Elementary
