= Koweta Mission Site =

- Koweta Mission
- U.S. National Register of Historic Places
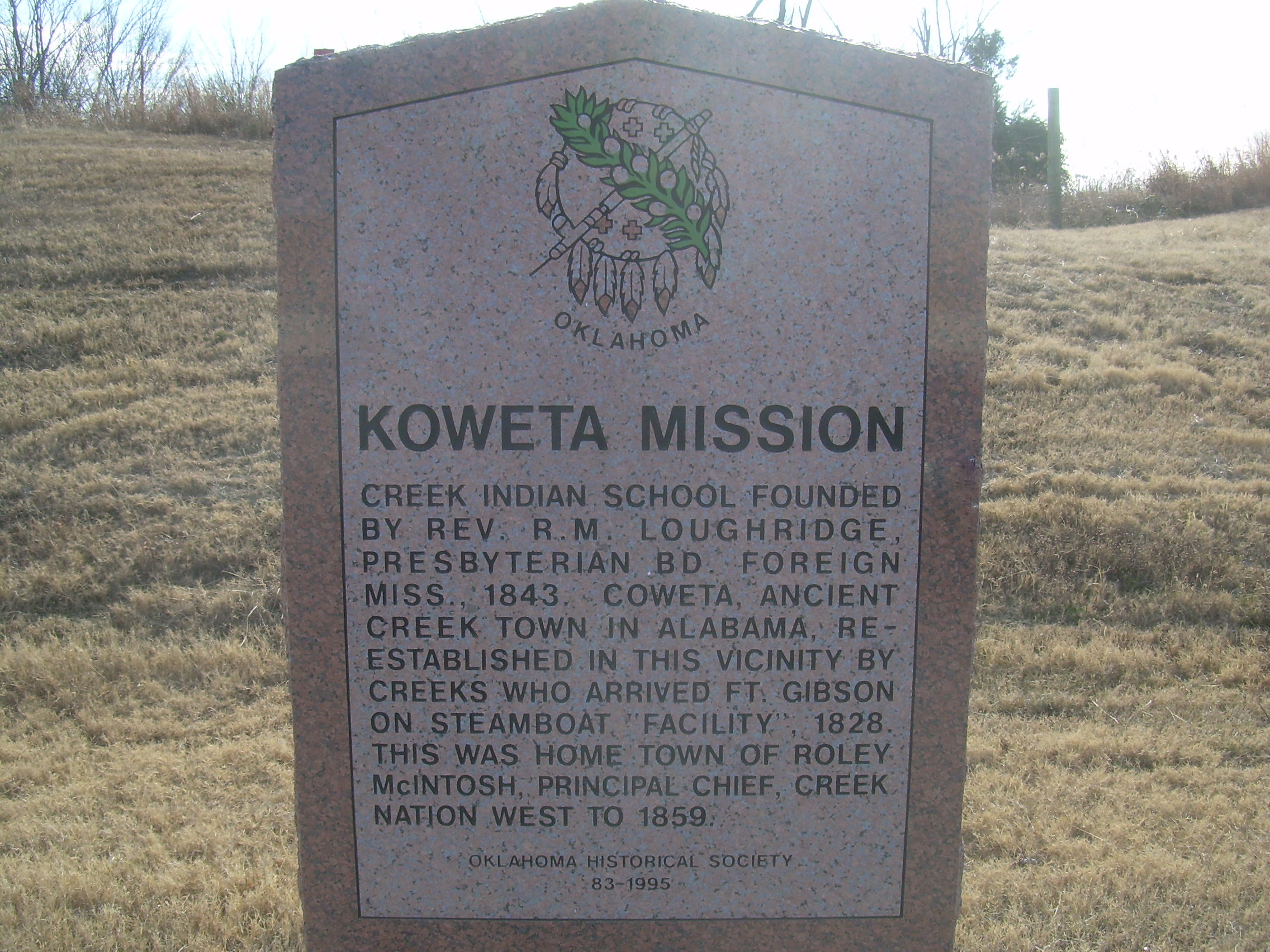
- Location: Coweta, Oklahoma
- Built: 1843
- Built by: Rev. Robert Loughridge
- NRHP reference No.: 73001571
- Added to NRHP: 1973

Koweta Mission Site is a site near Coweta, Oklahoma, and listed on the National Register of Historic Places. The mission was started in 1843 by Presbyterian minister Robert Loughridge at Coweta, then the capital of the Creek Nation, Indian Territory. He named the mission "Koweta", after the Creek capital. The school operated until the American Civil War, when Loughridge and most missionaries left the territory.

== History ==
For a time the Creek people had resisted Protestant religious missions and their related schools, outlawing Christianity and preaching because it disrupted their traditional culture. But in 1842, Robert Loughridge, a Presbyterian missionary, had traveled to Coweta to meet with the Creek Council, who gave him permission to open a mission, because the Creek wanted to have their children educated. Loughridge made the school dependent on the mission.

Rev. Loughridge later wrote to the US Indian agent for the Creek, Colonel James Logan, describing the beginning of his work with the Creek people:

"Although the old chief at first had a manifested some fears of our religious influence interfering with their old customs, yet he gave us a cordial welcome, and requested me to locate the mission in his town. This I did and called the station Koweta, after the name of his home town. It was situated about 24 miles northwest of Fort Gibson, and one and one-half miles east of the Arkansas River. There was on the place selected a vacant Indian cabin 14x24 feet, with a dirt floor and covered with clapboards. Connected with it was a small unfenced field and a few fruit trees. For the whole premises, I paid the owner ten dollars. As planks could not be hauled a great distance, I had hired some men to split out 'luncheons' and floor the house. In this little cabin we lived happily for more than a year, and in this cabin our first child was born. As by agreement I could only preach at the Mission station. My first object was to build a log house to answer the double purpose of school and church. As soon therefore as it was ready for use, my wife commenced teaching a school of fifteen or twenty children, and the neighbors were invited to attendance at the Mission, while the most of them were devotedly attached to their old customs and superstitions. The outlook was very discouraging."

The school operated for about 3 months until sickness and a lack of adequate accommodations resulted in Loughridge temporarily closing it. After a while, more Creek began attending Loughridge's services.

His wife Olivia gave birth to their second child on September 5, 1845. But the nearest physician lived in Fort Gibson and was not in the area. Olivia developed puerperal fever on September 17, and died at the age of twenty-nine. One year later, on September 26, 1846, that second child also died; it was buried next to Olivia Loughridge, in what is known as the Bruner Family Cemetery. This was on the Hopping Farm, a mile and a half southeast of Coweta. Today the site is marked only by a cemetery.

Creek officials granted Loughridge permission to build a second school, which he called Tullahassee Mission. Completed in 1859, it was located 16 miles east of Koweta Mission and 10 miles west of Fort Gibson. Another missionary couple, the Rev. and Mrs. William Robertson, operated this boarding school.

After the American Civil War broke out, the Presbyterians abandoned the Koweta Mission and left the Territory, as did other missionaries. It was burned during the war. During the war years, most missionaries abandoned the schools and churches they had started among the tribes, but many children had received some education. With the war, most of the ministers and teachers left Indian Territory for the duration of the conflict.

The Creek developed a tribal school system funded from federal annuities paid following their removal to Indian Territory. In the later nineteenth century, the Creek Nation encouraged the founding of more schools: Wealaka Mission School (1882), which replaced Tullahassee; Asbury Manual Labor School, Harrell Institute (1881), Bacone College (1885), Levering Mission, Nuyaka Mission, and Yuchi Mission. In this period, they had a total of 7 boarding schools for Indian children, 3 boarding schools for Creek Freedmen, and 65 day schools.
