= Tullahassee Mission Site =

- U.S. National Register of Historic Places
- Location: Tullahassee, Oklahoma
- Built: March 1, 1850
- Built by: Rev. Robert Loughridge
- NRHP reference No.: 71000674
- Added to NRHP: 1971

Tullahassee Mission (Creek: Tvlvhasse) was a Presbyterian mission and school, founded on March 1, 1850, in the Creek Nation, Indian Territory by Robert Loughridge. This Presbyterian minister had been serving there since 1843, when he founded Koweta Mission. This mission was also originally built for Muscogee Creek students, and the community of Tullahassee developed there.

After a devastating fire in 1880, the Muscogee transferred their children to Wealaka, another mission school. The community of Tullahassee had become increasingly settled by descendants of Creek Freedmen, and the number of Muscogee had declined there. The Muscogee gave the Tullahassee mission and community to the Creek Freedmen, and it is one of the few surviving all-black towns in the state. The Muscogee paid to replace the damaged main Tullahassee building.

It reopened in 1883 as Tullahassee Manual Labor School. After statehood, the federal government took over control of the property and sold it in 1914 to Wagoner County. In 1916 the African Methodist Episcopal Church bought the property for use as Flipper-Key-Davis College. The private junior college was the only institution in the state for higher education for African Americans. It closed in 1935 during the Great Depression.

== History ==
While in the Southeast and soon after removal, most Muscogee Creek were opposed to all European-American missionaries and their schools, as they did not want their traditional culture disrupted by Christianity. But in 1842 the Creek Council had authorized Loughridge to set up a mission in Coweta, in order to get the associated school to educate their children. He returned in 1843 and founded Koweta Mission after the town. After assessing this school, the Creek Council allowed Loughridge in 1850 to establish another mission, Tullahassee, northwest of the community of Muskogee.

The Creek said they would pay one-fifth of the cost from their annuities; the rest would be covered by the Presbyterian Board of Foreign Missions. Loughridge chose the site for Tullahassee Mission and purchased 70 acres (280,000 m^{2}) of land from Thomas Marshall to support the complex. As at other boarding schools, students and staff would raise their own food and livestock on the facility.

A three-storey, brick building was constructed on the site. It housed 80 students, primarily full-blood Creek. Opened in 1850, it was operated as an Indian boarding school for the next three decades to train both "full- blood" and "mixed-blood" Muscogee students. The latter generally had some European ancestry and were often descendants of traders who had married into the tribe in previous decades.

=== Transfer of school to Creek Freedmen ===
During this period the community changed; after the Civil War, Creek Freedmen gathered in certain communities, among them Tullahassee, and outnumbered Muscogee Creek. The main Tullahassee building was largely destroyed by an accidental fire in December 1880. The Muscogee Creek Council relocated their children to a new school, Wealaka Mission, as their population had been declining in Tullahassee.

They offered the former school and its improved 100 acres (0.40 km^{2}) plot to the Creek Freedmen as a school for their children. The council also paid to replace the burned main building and essentially turned over the community to the Freedmen.

The Muscogee children were transferred to Wealaka Mission in 1881. The tribal leaders turned over the former mission building to Creek Freedmen on October 24, 1881.

The school reopened in 1883 for Creek Freedmen and their descendants as Tullahassee Manual Labor School. Additional funding was contributed by the Baptist Home Mission Society. The Freedmen had the town incorporated in 1902 and recruited more African-American Freedmen from the South as settlers.

Much of the Creek lands (including that assigned to Creek Freedmen) had been allotted to households by the early 20th century. In 1906, to extinguish tribal land claims and organization in preparation for Oklahoma to be admitted as a state, the federal government dissolved Creek institutions, including its school system.

Tullahassee Manual Labor School was the only school in the former Creek Nation to remain temporarily open for descendants of Creek Freedmen and other African Americans. In 1908 the US government took over ownership of the site via the United States Department of Interior, which by then had been authorized by Congress to have responsibility for Indian trust lands and treaties. Interior sold the property in 1914 to Wagoner County, Oklahoma for local uses.

In 1916, the African Methodist Episcopal Church (the first independent black denomination in the United States, established in Philadelphia, Pennsylvania) founded Flipper-Key-Davis College in Tullahassee. It was permitted to use the former mission building for the school. This was the only private school for higher education for African Americans in Oklahoma at the time. The college closed at the end of the 1935 school year, during the Great Depression, when many institutions had financial difficulties.

An informal sign marks the Tullahassee Creek Indian Cemetery, established by 1883 near the mission site. In the 21st century, the small community of Tullahassee is considered the oldest of the surviving thirteen all-black towns in former Indian Territory.

== See also ==
Nuyaka Mission
