= Nuyaka Mission =

- Nuyaka Mission, Oklahoma
- U.S. National Register of Historic Places
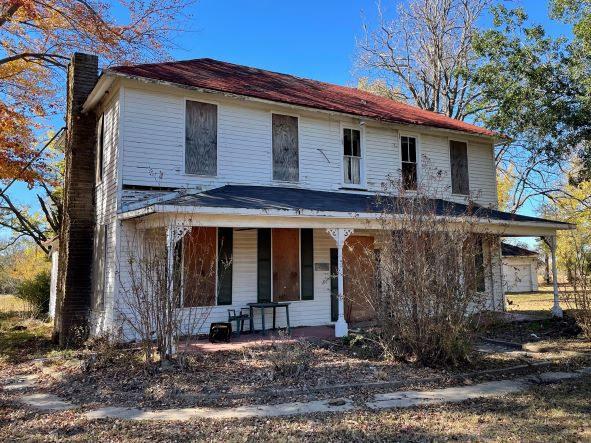
- Superintendent’s House in 2022

- Location within Oklahoma Location within the United States
- Nearest city: Okmulgee, Oklahoma
- Coordinates: 35°38′59″N 96°9′46″W
- Area: 5 acres (2.0 ha)
- Built: 1882
- NRHP reference No.: 72001075
- Added to NRHP: April 13, 1972

The Nuyaka Mission (Creek: Nuyakv) site is located in Okmulgee County, Oklahoma, on McKeown Rd. (a.k.a. E0945 Rd) just off N 120 Rd (a.k.a. N3850 Rd), approximately 15.7 miles west of the intersection of U.S. Route 75 and State Highway 56 (a.k.a. 6th Street) in the City of Okmulgee, Oklahoma. The Nuyaka Mission is included on the National Register of Historic Places listings in Okmulgee County, Oklahoma. The mission was established by Alice Mary Robertson at the request of the Creek Council, and run by the Presbyterian Church.

Initially the Creek principal chief proposed to name the mission Robertson Institute, in honor of William S. Robertson, but his daughter, Augusta, wrote a letter stating that the family preferred that the name should be from the Creek language. Therefore, Nuyaka Mission was named for the nearby Creek town of Nuyaka. According to one source, the name Nuyaka is from the Creek pronunciation for New York, which was the site of a meeting between President George Washington and 26 Creek chiefs. The meeting was to discuss a treaty and to obtain a cession of Creek land to the U, S. Government. Reportedly, the Creeks were so impressed with New York City that they named one of their towns for it. White men wrote the town name as Nuyaka. Ironically, some of the official correspondence cited by Carolyn Thomas Foreman, gives the name as "New Yorker Mission" and "Nuyarker Mission."

The mission consisted of four buildings. One building contained a chapel/assembly room and some school class rooms. The second building held the superintendent's apartment and housed the boys. The other two buildings were cottages that housed the girls and the teachers who supervised them. Initially, the mission enrolled seventy boys and girls. It had seven female teachers and one man who supervised the boys after school hours. Rev. Thomas Ward Perryman, a Creek who had been educated at Tullahassee Mission, was the first pastor and taught religious classes.

Per the granite marker at the site: "Established in 1882 by the Creek Council, Nuyaka Mission was a boarding school for Boys and Girls by the Presbyterians from 1884 to 1899. The Creek Tribe then operated the school for ten years. From 1909 until 1921 it was operated by the Bureau of Indian Affairs. From 1921 to 1933 it was operated by the Baptists."

"In 1936, the buildings were removed and E.E. Mount bought the site to prevent its destruction. In 1937, his daughter and son-in-law, Oakla and Bill Spears, bought the site and lived in the Dormitory Superintendent's home for 54 years. Interested in the site's history, they interviewed former students and children of former superintendents. Their efforts led to the preservation of the property which they donated to the Oklahoma Historical Society in 1992."

The marker from the Oklahoma Historical Society on SH-56 says, “NUYUKA MISSION Founded by Presbyterian Bd, and Creek Nation, 1882, through work of Alice Robertson. Later first woman elected to Congress from State: Augusta Robertson Moore, 1st Supt. Of Mission School. Nuyaka Town nearby was the seat of the “Loyal Creek” faction in the “Green Peach War.” Led by Isparhecker later Chief of Creek Nation.”

Pursuant to the Oklahoma Legislature's Enrolled Senate Concurrent Resolution No. 25 in May 2003, ownership of the site was transferred from the Oklahoma Historical Society to the Nuyaka Homecoming Association and Historical Society, Inc.

== See also ==
Alice Mary Robertson

Ghost Towns In Oklahoma

Map Of Ghost Towns In Oklahoma
