= Coweta, Oklahoma =

Coweta, Oklahoma Kvwetv (Creek)
- City
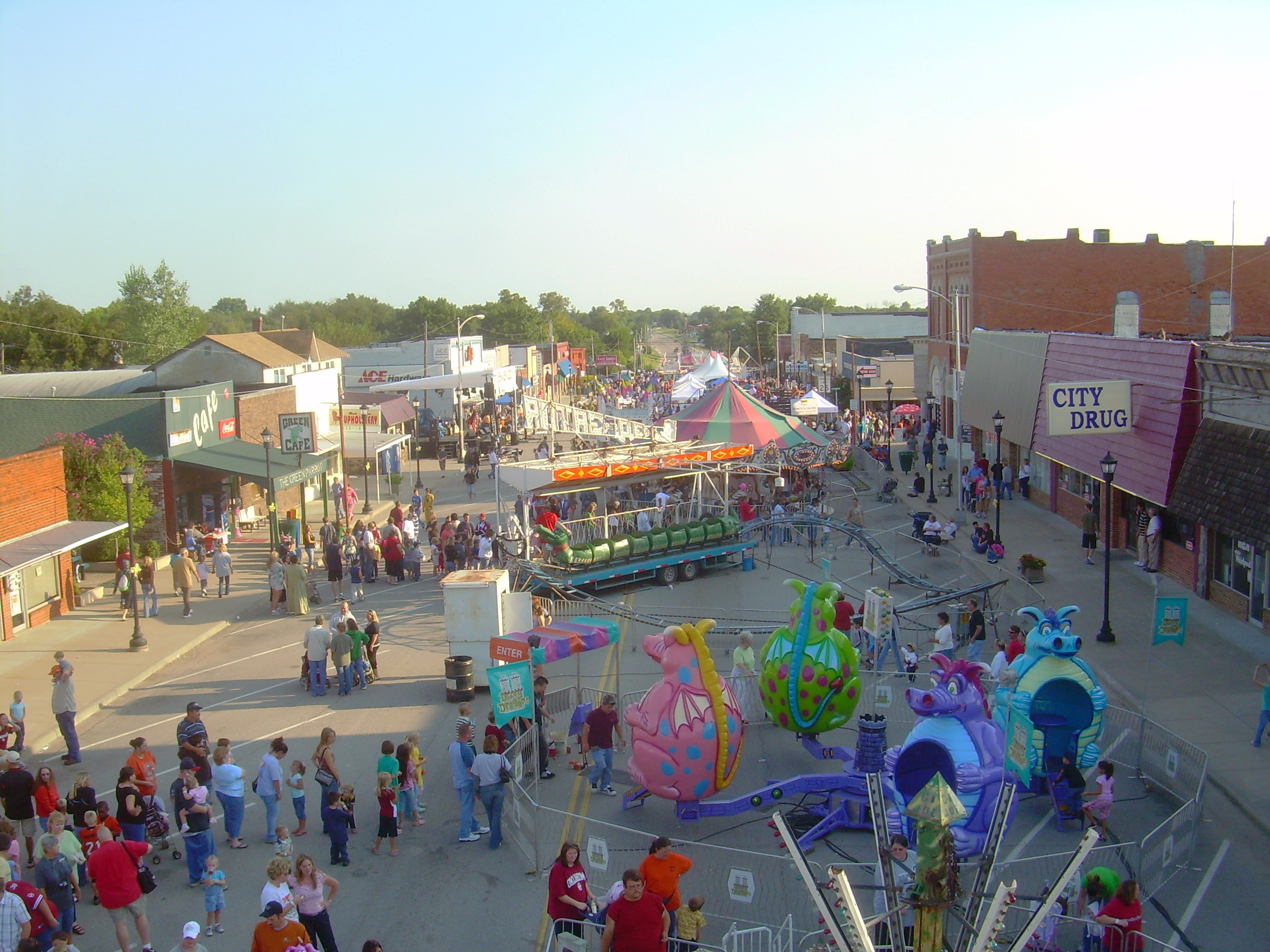
- Coweta Fall Festival, September 2007, courtesy of Caleb Long

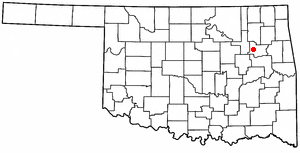
- Location of Coweta, Oklahoma
- Coordinates: 35°57′47″N 95°39′42″W
- Country: United States
- State: Oklahoma
- County: Wagoner

Area
  - Total: 10.71 sq mi (27.73 km^{2})
  - Land: 10.58 sq mi (27.41 km^{2})
  - Water: 0.12 sq mi (0.32 km^{2})
- Elevation: 663 ft (202 m)

Population (2020)
  - Total: 9,654
  - Density: 912.1/sq mi (352.16/km^{2})
- Time zone: UTC-6 (Central (CST))
  - Summer (DST): UTC-5 (CDT)
- ZIP code: 74429
- Area codes: 539/918
- FIPS code: 40-17800
- GNIS feature ID: 1091781
- Website: City of Coweta

Coweta (Creek: Kvwetv) is a city in Wagoner County, Oklahoma, United States, a suburb of Tulsa. Part of the Creek Nation in Indian Territory before Oklahoma became a U.S. state, the town was first settled in 1840. As of the 2020 census, Coweta had a population of 9,654; however, the fast-growing Tulsa suburb had an estimated population of 11,472 as of 2025, an increase of 18.3% over 2020.

== History ==
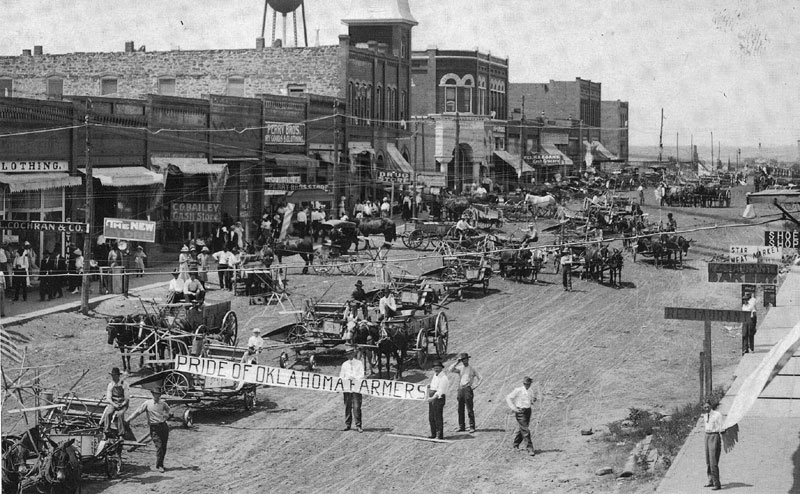
Oklahoma Farmers parade in downtown Coweta, 1905

Before statehood, when the Five Tribes or Five Civilized Tribes were moved to Indian Territory from the Southeastern United States, the area that is now Coweta was designated as part of the Muscogee (Creek) Nation. Coweta was named after a Lower Creek town on the Chattahoochee River in southwestern Georgia. It was first settled by Muscogee about 1840.

In 1843, Robert Loughridge, a Presbyterian minister, arrived in the area and established a mission, named "Koweta". He had gained Creek Council approval for this the year before. Loughridge left Koweta in 1850 to supervise the newly completed Tullahassee Mission School. Both schools closed in 1861 at the outbreak of the American Civil War, when missionaries left the Territory.

In 1867 after the Civil War, the Creek Indians adopted a constitution related to the model of the United States. In addition to government, it established six districts for their nation. Everything northeast of the Arkansas River, including Tulsa, became the Coweta district. The political center of this district was located in a log courthouse on Coweta Creek, about a quarter mile west of present-day center of downtown Coweta. The post office was established on May 24, 1897, and took its name from Koweta Mission.

As a result of negotiations with the congressionally appointed Dawes Commission, regarding the allotment of tribal communal lands in 1897–1898, the Creek courts’ jurisdiction was turned over to the federal government.

Notable events in 1903 included the arrival of the Missouri-Kansas-Texas Railroad in Coweta; founding of the community's first newspaper, The Courier; construction of the first public school for whites; and installation of a telephone line.

The Creek Nation had already established numerous schools for Indian children in their territory well before this time. The tribal school system was funded from federal annuities paid following Creek removal to Indian Territory. By the later 19th century, the Creek Nation encouraged the founding of more schools: Wealaka Mission School (1882), which replaced Tullahassee; Asbury Manual Labor School, transferred from Alabama; Harrell Institute (1881); Bacone College (1885); and Levering, Nuyaka, and Yuchi Mission schools. In this period, they had seven boarding schools for Indian children, three boarding schools for descendants of Creek Freedmen, including what was known after 1883 as the Tullahassee Manual Labor School; and 65 day schools.

== Geography ==
Coweta is located at 35°57′47″N 95°39′42″W (35.963155, -95.661586). Coweta is on the Arkansas River, 30 miles (48 km) southeast of Tulsa and 30 miles (48 km) northwest of Muskogee.

According to the United States Census Bureau, the city has a total area of 7.7 sq mi (20 km^{2}), of which 0.1 sq mi (0.26 km^{2}) (1.56%) is covered by water.

=== Climate ===
Coweta has a temperate climate of the humid subtropical variety (Köppen Cfa) with a yearly average precipitation of 43.9 inches (1,120 mm) and average snowfall of 1.8 inches (46 mm).

== Demographics ==
Historical population
| Census | Pop. | Note | %± |
|---|---|---|---|
| 1910 | 1,187 | | — |
| 1920 | 1,318 | | 11.0% |
| 1930 | 1,274 | | −3.3% |
| 1940 | 1,455 | | 14.2% |
| 1950 | 1,601 | | 10.0% |
| 1960 | 1,858 | | 16.1% |
| 1970 | 2,457 | | 32.2% |
| 1980 | 4,554 | | 85.3% |
| 1990 | 6,159 | | 35.2% |
| 2000 | 7,139 | | 15.9% |
| 2010 | 9,943 | | 39.3% |
| 2020 | 9,654 | | −2.9% |
U.S. Decennial Census

=== 2020 census ===
As of the 2020 census, Coweta had a population of 9,654. The median age was 35.0 years. 27.9% of residents were under the age of 18 and 14.4% of residents were 65 years of age or older. For every 100 females there were 95.0 males, and for every 100 females age 18 and over there were 89.7 males age 18 and over.

92.3% of residents lived in urban areas, while 7.7% lived in rural areas.

There were 3,677 households in Coweta, of which 37.3% had children under the age of 18 living in them. Of all households, 49.1% were married-couple households, 16.9% were households with a male householder and no spouse or partner present, and 27.5% were households with a female householder and no spouse or partner present. About 24.0% of all households were made up of individuals and 9.8% had someone living alone who was 65 years of age or older.

There were 3,915 housing units, of which 6.1% were vacant. Among occupied housing units, 69.4% were owner-occupied and 30.6% were renter-occupied. The homeowner vacancy rate was 1.4% and the rental vacancy rate was 7.6%.

Racial composition as of the 2020 census
| Race | Percent |
|---|---|
| White | 66.8% |
| Black or African American | 2.9% |
| American Indian and Alaska Native | 11.3% |
| Asian | 0.6% |
| Native Hawaiian and Other Pacific Islander | 0.1% |
| Some other race | 2.5% |
| Two or more races | 15.8% |
| Hispanic or Latino (of any race) | 5.3% |

=== 2000 census ===
As of the 2000 census, 7,139 people, 2,582 households, and 1,988 families were residing in the city. The population density was 942.1 people/sq mi (363.6/km^{2}). The 2,827 housing units averaged 373.1/sq mi (144.0/km^{2}). The racial makeup of the city was 75.78% White, 4.08% African American, 11.85% Native American, 0.21% Asian, 1.75% from other races and 6.32% from two or more races. Hispanics or Latinos of any race were 3.80% of the population.

Of the 2,582 households, 43.0% had children under 18 living with them, 58.5% were married couples living together, 13.9% had a female householder with no husband present, and 23.0% were not families. About 19.9% of all households were made up of individuals, and 6.6% had someone living alone who was 65 or older. The average household size was 2.74, and the average family size was 3.14.

In the city, the age distribution was 30.9% under 18, 9.6% from 18 to 24, 31.0% from 25 to 44, 20.0% from 45 to 64, and 8.6% who were 65 or older. The median age was 31 years. For every 100 females, there were 95.1 males. For every 100 females age 18 and over, there were 90.5 males.

The median income for a household in the city was $38,255, and for a family was $41,786. Males had a median income of $32,348 versus $21,772 for females. The per capita income for the city was $14,960. About 6.2% of families and 7.4% of the population were below the poverty line, including 7.4% of those under age 18 and 11.1% of those age 65 or over.

== Schools ==
The Coweta Public School District is the 29th-largest school district in the state, and as of October 2007, the district had 3,161 prekindergarten through 12th-grade students enrolled in six different schools; the district is also the largest in Wagoner County.

== Media ==
Coweta has one newspaper, the Coweta American. The paper is published every Wednesday. It is owned by BH Media Group.

== Economy ==
Historically, Coweta's economy was based on agriculture' until the 1960s. Production of grain is still important, but cotton acreage has decreased greatly. Now, the city's largest employers are Coweta school system, Walmart (one retail store), and the City of Coweta. Many employed residents now commute to Tulsa, Broken Arrow, or Muskogee.

In March of 2026, the Muscogee Nation opened a $100 million, 104,000-square-foot casino/hotel in town.

== Government ==
Coweta has a council-manager form of government.

== Points of interest ==
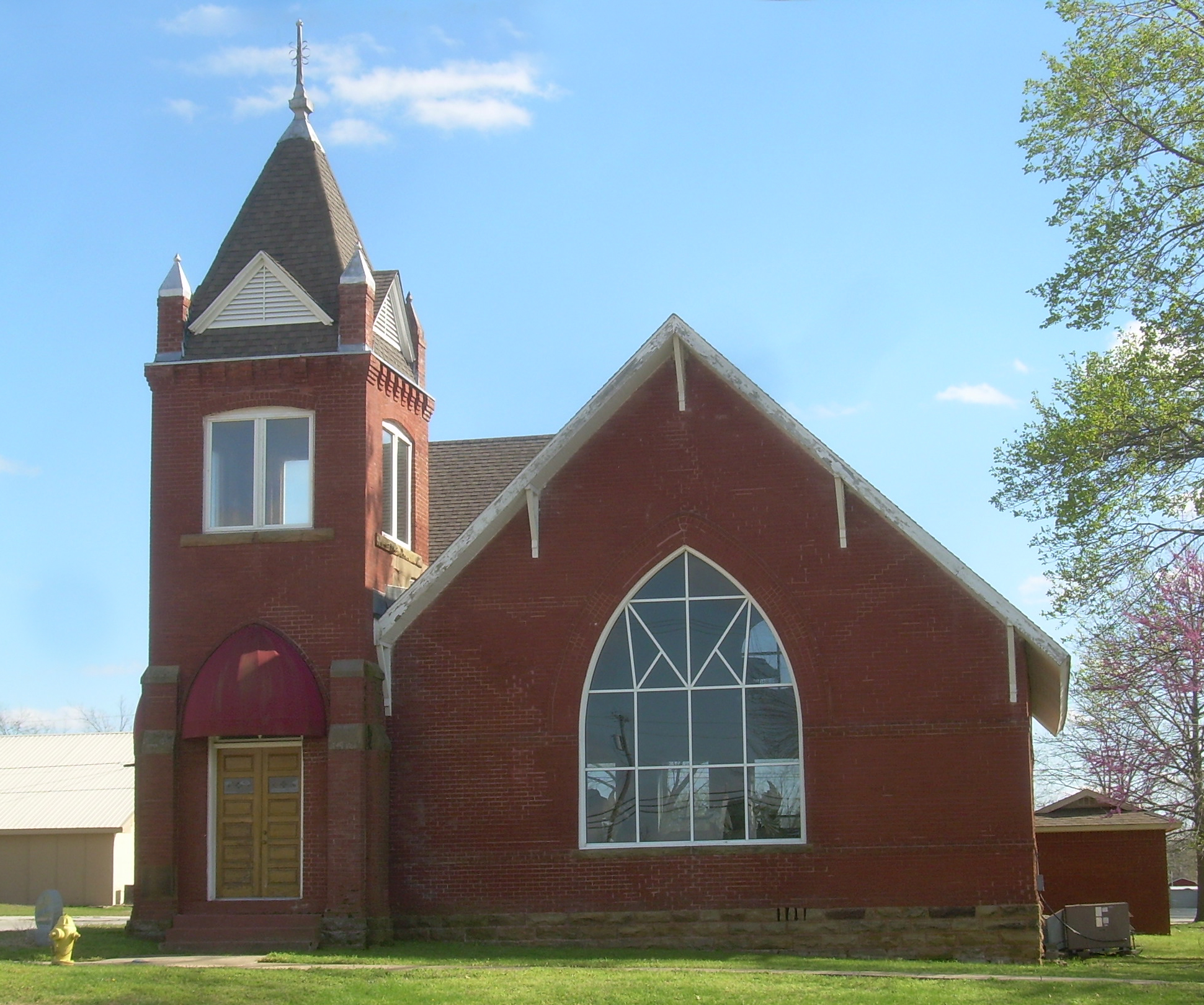
The Coweta Mission Bell Museum.

Coweta is home to two sites on the National Register of Historic Places list. The Koweta Mission Site was added to the NRHP in 1973, but today, only a cemetery remains. The other site is the First Presbyterian Church of Coweta, subsequently known as the Mission Bell Museum, which was added to the NRHP in 2003. The building, now event space, has its original chandelier and 10 of the 32 original pews.

== Notable people ==
- William R. "Bill" Bright (October 19, 1921 – July 19, 2003), founder of Campus Crusade for Christ
- Rick Bryan (March 20, 1962 - July 25, 2009) was a two-time All-American for the Oklahoma Sooners, and 9-year NFL player (Atlanta Falcons).
- Bruce Cowling (1919-1986), an actor, was born in Coweta.
- Crooked X, a rock band, was discovered on the CBS television's The Early Show.
- Lilah Denton Lindsey was a Creek, civic leader, and women's club organizer.
- George Milburn (1903 - 1966), author, was born and raised in Coweta.
- Louis Oliver (April 9, 1904 – May 10, 1991) was a Creek poet.
- Donald P. Sloat (1949 - 1970), born in Coweta, was posthumously awarded a Medal of Honor for act of valor in the Vietnam War.
- Stephanie Hollman (June 13, 1980), born in Coweta, is known for The Real Housewives of Dallas.
