= 2022 United States Senate special election in Oklahoma =

- November 8, 2022
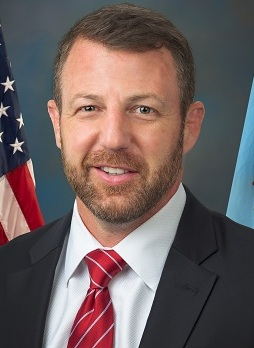

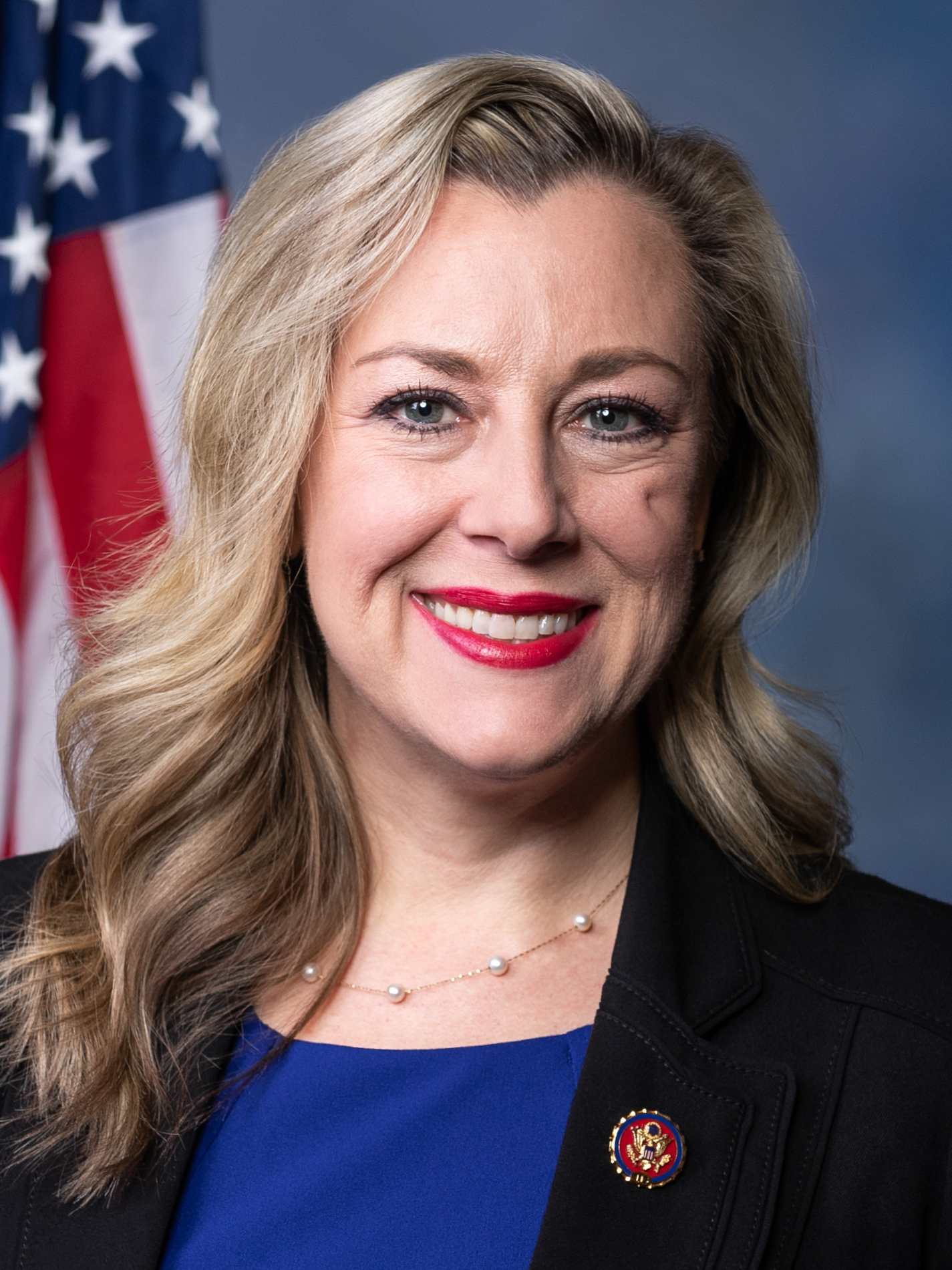
| Nominee | Markwayne Mullin | Kendra Horn |
| Party | Republican | Democratic |
| Popular vote | 710,643 | 405,389 |
| Percentage | 61.77% | 35.24% |
- Mullin: 40–50% 50–60% 60–70% 70–80% 80–90% >90% Horn: 40–50% 50–60% 60–70% 70–80% 80–90% >90% Tie: 40–50% 50% No votes
U.S. senator before election
Jim Inhofe
Republican
Elected U.S. senator
Markwayne Mullin
Republican

The 2022 United States Senate special election in Oklahoma was held on November 8, 2022, to elect a member of the United States Senate for Oklahoma. The election took place concurrently with the regularly scheduled election for Oklahoma's other Senate seat. The candidate filing deadline was between April 13 and 15, 2022.

This special election was held to fill the remaining four years of incumbent Republican Senator Jim Inhofe's term. In February 2022, Inhofe announced that he would resign early at the end of the 117th United States Congress on January 3, 2023, reportedly due to long COVID. He was first elected in a 1994 special election with 55% of the vote, succeeding Democratic Senator David Boren in the wake of his impending resignation to become president of the University of Oklahoma. Most recently, Inhofe was re-elected to a fifth full term in 2020 with 62.9% of the vote.

Former U.S. Representative Kendra Horn secured the Democratic nomination by default, while the primary election for the Republican nomination took place on June 28, 2022. U.S. Representative Markwayne Mullin won the Republican primary runoff on August 23, defeating former State House Speaker T. W. Shannon. Mullin ultimately won the election.

Mullin, a member of the Cherokee Nation, became the first Native American to serve in the U.S. Senate since fellow Republican Ben Nighthorse Campbell retired from Congress in 2005, and the first Native American representing this state since Robert Owen in 1925. Conversely, Horn won Oklahoma County, making her the first Democrat since 2008 to carry any Oklahoma county in a Senate election.

== Republican primary ==
On February 25, 2022, Jim Inhofe, the state's longest-serving U.S. senator, announced he would leave office at the end of the 117th Congress, triggering a special election for his U.S. Senate seat in Oklahoma. A crowded field of candidates was expected in the Republican primary following the announcement of his retirement.

Luke Holland, Inhofe's former chief of staff, launched his campaign for Inhofe's seat on the same day with Inhofe's endorsement. The next day, Markwayne Mullin, a U.S. representative for Oklahoma's 2nd congressional district, announced his campaign. By February 28, Oklahoma State Senator Nathan Dahm had announced he was switching his campaign from running for Oklahoma's Class III seat to running for the special election seat. On March 8, former United States National Security Council chief of staff Alex Gray announced his campaign. T. W. Shannon, a former speaker of the Oklahoma House of Representatives, officially announced his campaign on March 11. Scott Pruitt, former administrator of the Environmental Protection Agency, filed to run on April 15.

=== Candidates ===
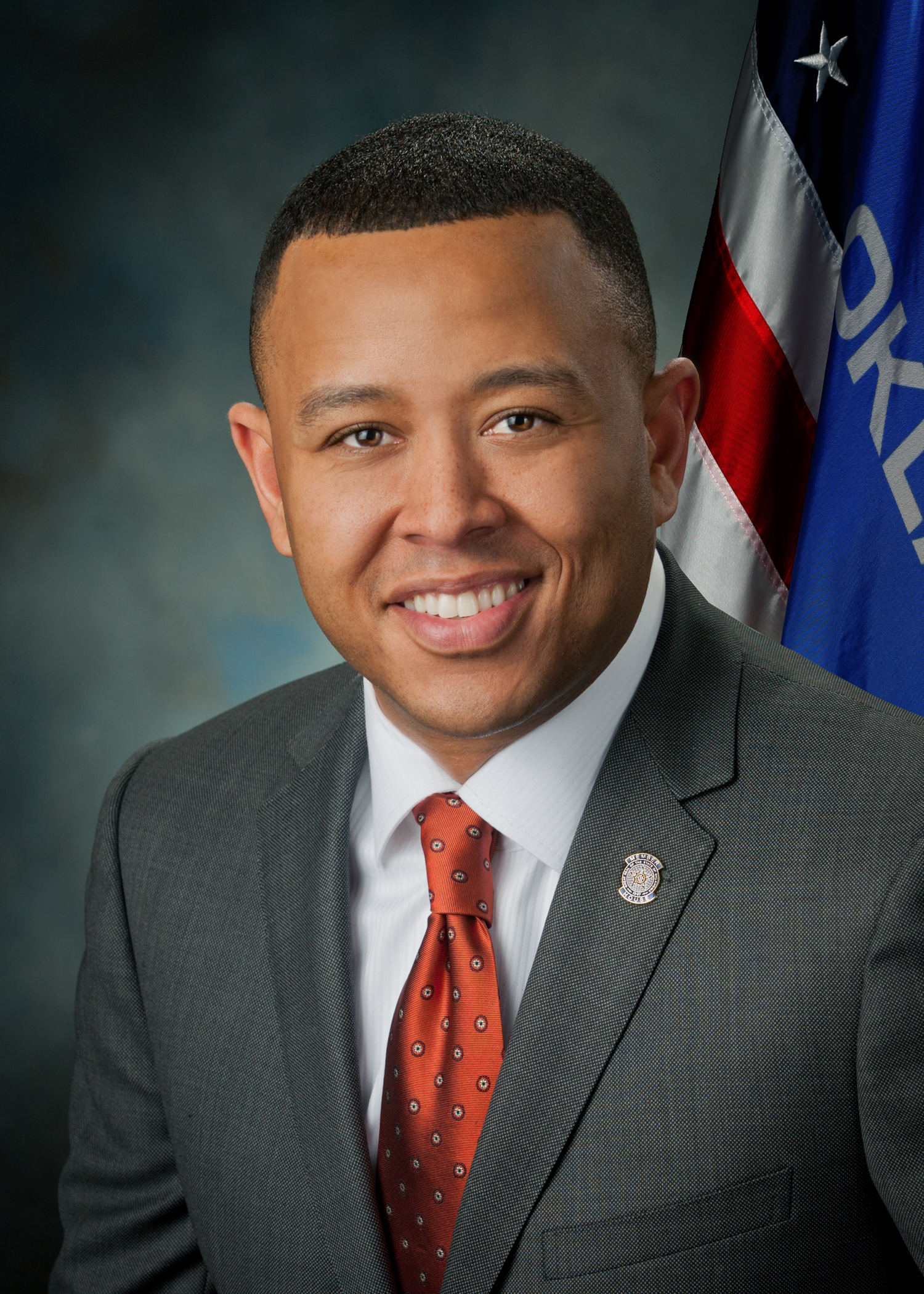
Former state house speaker T. W. Shannon lost the runoff.

==== Nominee ====
- Markwayne Mullin, U.S. representative for Oklahoma's 2nd congressional district

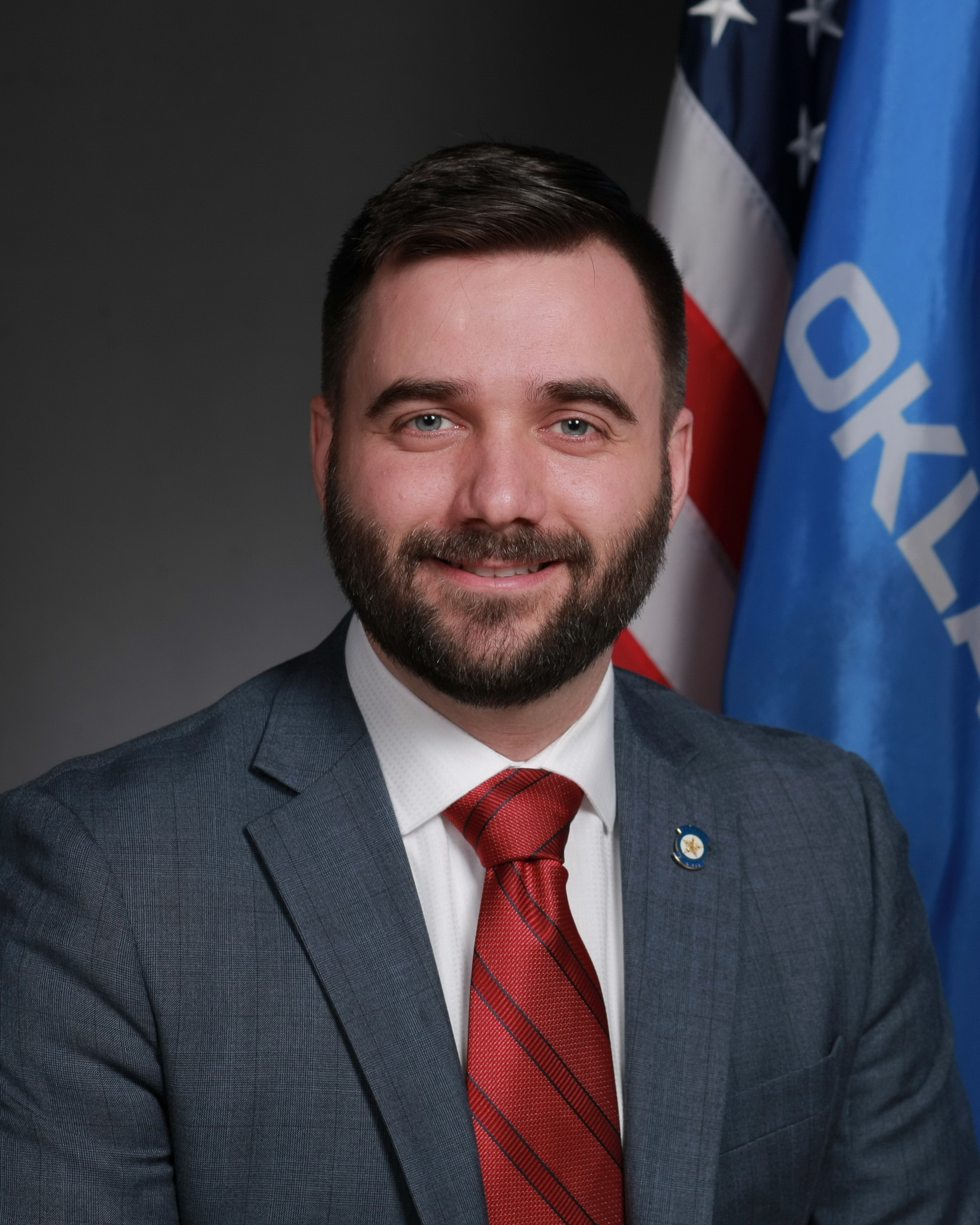
State senator Nathan Dahm finished third in the initial primary.

==== Eliminated in runoff ====
- T. W. Shannon, former speaker of the Oklahoma House of Representatives (2013–2014) for the 62nd district (2007–2015) and candidate for U.S. Senate in 2014

==== Eliminated in initial primary ====
- Michael Coibion
- Nathan Dahm, state senator for the 33rd district (2012–2024) and candidate for Oklahoma's 1st congressional district in 2010 and 2018
- Jessica Jean Garrison, author, dietician and daughter of former state senator Earl Garrison
- Randy Grellner, physician
- Luke Holland, former chief of staff for U.S. Senator Jim Inhofe
- Adam Holley, office manager
- Laura Moreno
- Scott Pruitt, former administrator of the Environmental Protection Agency (2017–2018) and former attorney general of Oklahoma (2011–2017)
- Paul Royse
- John Tompkins, orthopedic surgeon and candidate for U.S. Senate in 2020

==== Withdrew before primary ====
- Alex Gray, former United States National Security Council chief of staff (endorsed Luke Holland in primary and Markwayne Mullin in runoff)

==== Declined ====
- Stephanie Bice, U.S. representative for Oklahoma's 5th congressional district (running for re-election)
- Jim Bridenstine, former administrator of the National Aeronautics and Space Administration (2018–2021) and former U.S. representative for Oklahoma's 1st congressional district (2013–2018)
- G. T. Bynum, mayor of Tulsa
- Gentner Drummond, attorney (running for attorney general)
- Kevin Hern, U.S. representative for Oklahoma's 1st congressional district (running for re-election)
- Jackson Lahmeyer, pastor (ran for the Class 3 U.S. Senate seat)
- Frank Lucas, U.S. representative for Oklahoma's 3rd congressional district (running for re-election)
- Charles McCall, speaker of the Oklahoma House of Representatives
- Kyle McCarter, former U.S. ambassador to Kenya
- John M. O'Connor, attorney general of Oklahoma (running for attorney general)
- Matt Pinnell, lieutenant governor of Oklahoma (running for re-election)
- R. Trent Shores, former U.S. attorney for the Northern District of Oklahoma (2017–2021)
- Kevin Stitt, governor of Oklahoma (running for re-election)
- Greg Treat, president pro tempore of the Oklahoma Senate
- J. C. Watts, former U.S. representative for Oklahoma's 4th congressional district (1995–2003)
- Paul Wesselhoft, legislator for the 9th district of the Citizen Potawatomi Nation (2007–present) and former state representative for the 54th district (2004–2016)

=== First round ===
==== Endorsements ====
Nathan Dahm

U.S. senators

- Rand Paul, U.S. senator from Kentucky (2011–present)

Newspapers

- Tulsa Beacon

Organizations

- Eagle Forum PAC
- National Association for Gun Rights
- Oklahoma Second Amendment Association
- Oklahomans for Health and Parental Rights
Alex Gray (withdrew)

Federal executive officials

- Adam Boehler, first CEO of the U.S. International Development Finance Corporation (2019–2021)
- David M. Friedman, former U.S. ambassador to Israel (2017–2021)
- Richard Grenell, former acting director of National Intelligence (2020), former U.S. ambassador to Germany (2018–2020), and special presidential envoy for Serbia and Kosovo Peace Negotiations (2019–2021)
- Keith Kellogg, retired U.S. Army lieutenant general, former executive secretary and chief of staff of the U.S. National Security Council (2017–2018), and national security advisor to the vice president of the U.S. (2018–2021)
- Chris Miller, former acting United States secretary of defense (2020–2021)
- Robert O'Brien, 28th U.S. national security advisor (2019–2021)
- Kash Patel, former chief of staff to the acting United States secretary of defense
- Matthew Whitaker, former acting U.S. attorney general (2018–2019), former chief of staff to the U.S. attorney general (2017–2018), and former U.S. attorney for the Southern District of Iowa (2004–2009)

U.S. senators

- Mike Lee, U.S. senator from Utah (2011–present)
- Pete Wilson, 36th governor of California (1991–1999) and former U.S. senator from California (1983–1991)

U.S. representatives

- Paul Gosar, U.S. representative for Arizona's 4th congressional district (2013–present)

County officials

- Joe Arpaio, 36th sheriff of Maricopa County, Arizona (1993–2017)
Randy Grellner

Federal executive officials

- Michael Flynn, 25th U.S. national security advisor (2017) (Democrat)

Individuals

- Jackson Lahmeyer, candidate for Republican nomination in 2022 United States Senate election in Oklahoma
- Ed Martin, president of Phyllis Schlafly Eagles and former chair of the Missouri Republican Party (2013–2015)

Organizations

- Phyllis Schlafly Eagles
Luke Holland

U.S. senators

- Jim Inhofe, U.S. senator from Oklahoma (1994–2023), former U.S. representative for Oklahoma's 1st congressional district (1987–1994) and former mayor of Tulsa (1978–1984)

Individuals

- Alex Gray, former United States National Security Council chief of staff and candidate in the Republican primary for the 2022 U.S. senate special election in Oklahoma

Political action committees

- Okieway
Markwayne Mullin

Individuals

- Harold Hamm, oil and gas industry businessman

Newspapers

- Southwest Ledger
T. W. Shannon

Federal executive officials

- Neal McCaleb, 8th assistant secretary of the interior for Indian affairs (2001–2003), 1st and 3rd Oklahoma Secretary of Transportation (1987–1991) (1995–2001), and former Oklahoma State representative (1975–1983)

State executive officials

- Rita Aragon, 4th Oklahoma secretary of veterans affairs (2011–2019) and retired United States Air National Guard major general
- Gary Ridley, 6th Oklahoma secretary of transportation (2009–2017)

State representatives

- Hopper Smith, United States National Guard brigadier general and former Oklahoma State representative for the 67th district

Tribal officials

- Bill Anoatubby, governor of the Chickasaw Nation (1987–present) (Democrat)

U.S. military generals

- Lee Baxter, retired United States Army major general
- Jesse Cross, 50th quartermaster general of the U.S. Army (2007–2010) and retired United States Army brigadier general
- Toney Stricklin, retired United States Army major general

Individuals

- Mark Levin, lawyer, author, and radio personality; host of The Mark Levin Show

Organizations

- Association of Oklahoma General Contractors
Scott Pruitt

Federal executive officials

- Rick Perry, former secretary of energy, former governor of Texas

==== Debates ====
2022 Republican primary debates
| No. | Date | Host | Moderator | Link | Participants | | | | |
Key: P Participant A Absent N Non-invitee I Invitee W Withdrawn
| Key: P Participant A Absent N Non-invitee I Invitee W Withdrawn | | | | | Nathan Dahm | Luke Holland | Markwayne Mullin | Scott Pruitt | T.W. Shannon |
|---|---|---|---|---|---|---|---|---|---|
| 1 | June 9, 2022 | News on 6 | Amanda Taylor | Link | P | P | A | P | P |
| 2 | June 22, 2022 | News on 6 | Alex Cameron | Link | P | P | A | P | P |

==== Polling ====
| Poll source | Date(s) administered | Sample size (Note: Key: A – all adults RV – registered voters LV – likely voters V – unclear) | Margin of error | Nathan Dahm | Jessica Garrison | Alex Gray | Randy Grellner | Luke Holland | Adam Holley | Markwayne Mullin | Scott Pruitt | T.W. Shannon | Other | Undecided |
|---|---|---|---|---|---|---|---|---|---|---|---|---|---|---|
| SoonerPoll | June 13–21, 2022 | 350 (LV) | ± 5.2% | 8% | – | 2% | 1% | 5% | – | 39% | 2% | 13% | – | 30% |
| Amber Integrated (R) | June 6–9, 2022 | 400 (LV) | ± 4.9% | 5% | 3% | 0% | 1% | 4% | 0% | 38% | 6% | 19% | 0% (Note: Coibion, Moreno, Royse, and Tompkins with 0%) | 22% |
| SoonerPoll | April 25 – May 11, 2022 | 306 (LV) | ± 5.6% | 6% | 0% | 0% | 1% | 3% | 1% | 38% | 3% | 16% | 0% | 31% |
| Amber Integrated (R) | March 24–27, 2022 | 455 (LV) | ± 4.6% | 6% | – | 1% | – | 2% | – | 39% | – | 14% | – | 38% |

==== Results ====
Initial primary results by county: Mullin: 40–50%; 50–60%; 60–70%; 70–80%; Shannon: 30–40%; Grellner: 20–30%

Republican primary results
| Party | Candidate | Votes | % |
|---|---|---|---|
| Republican | Markwayne Mullin | 156,087 | 43.62% |
| Republican | T. W. Shannon | 62,746 | 17.53% |
| Republican | Nathan Dahm | 42,673 | 11.92% |
| Republican | Luke Holland | 40,353 | 11.28% |
| Republican | Scott Pruitt | 18,052 | 5.04% |
| Republican | Randy Grellner | 15,794 | 4.41% |
| Republican | Laura Moreno | 6,597 | 1.84% |
| Republican | Jessica Jean Garrison | 6,114 | 1.71% |
| Republican | Alex Gray (withdrew) | 3,063 | 0.86% |
| Republican | John F. Tompkins | 2,332 | 0.65% |
| Republican | Adam Holley | 1,873 | 0.52% |
| Republican | Michael Coibion | 1,261 | 0.35% |
| Republican | Paul Royse | 900 | 0.25% |
| Total votes | | 357,845 | 100.0% |

=== Runoff ===
==== Endorsements during runoff ====
Markwayne Mullin

Executive branch officials

- Donald Trump, 45th president of the United States (2017–2021)

Statewide elected officials

- Kevin Stitt, governor of Oklahoma (2019–present)

==== Debates ====
2022 Republican primary debates
| No. | Date | Host | Moderator | Link | Participants | |
Key: P Participant A Absent N Non-invitee I Invitee W Withdrawn
| Key: P Participant A Absent N Non-invitee I Invitee W Withdrawn | | | | | Markwayne Mullin | T.W. Shannon |
|---|---|---|---|---|---|---|
| 1 | August 2, 2022 | News on 6 | | Link | P | P |

==== Polling ====
| Poll source | Date(s) administered | Sample size | Margin of error | Markwayne Mullin | T.W. Shannon | Undecided |
|---|---|---|---|---|---|---|
| SoonerPoll | August 11–17, 2022 | 322 (LV) | ± 5.4% | 53% | 47% | 0% |
| Amber Integrated (R) | August 11–15, 2022 | 684 (LV) | ± 3.8% | 49% | 31% | 20% |
| Battleground Connect (R) | July 31 – August 1, 2022 | 800 (LV) | ± 3.7% | 46% | 38% | 16% |
| SoonerPoll | July 25 – August 1, 2022 | 383 (LV) | ± 5.0% | 63% | 35% | 1% |

==== Results ====
Primary runoff results by county: Mullin: 50–60%; 60–70%; 70–80%; 80–90%; Shannon: 50–60%

Republican primary results
| Party | Candidate | Votes | % |
|---|---|---|---|
| Republican | Markwayne Mullin | 183,118 | 65.08% |
| Republican | T. W. Shannon | 98,246 | 34.92% |
| Total votes | | 281,364 | 100.0% |

== Democratic nomination ==
Former U.S. Representative Kendra Horn was the only Democrat to file to run, and was automatically awarded the Democratic nomination.

== General election ==
=== Candidates ===
- Kendra Horn (Democratic), former U.S. representative for Oklahoma's 5th congressional district
- Markwayne Mullin (Republican), U.S. representative for Oklahoma's 2nd congressional district
- Robert Murphy (Libertarian), retired University of Oklahoma data technician, U.S. Marine Corps veteran, and carpenter
- Ray Woods (independent), candidate for U.S. Senate in 2014

=== Predictions ===
| Source | Ranking | As of |
|---|---|---|
| The Cook Political Report | Solid R | February 24, 2022 |
| Inside Elections | Solid R | February 24, 2022 |
| Sabato's Crystal Ball | Safe R | March 1, 2022 |
| Politico | Solid R | April 1, 2022 |
| RCP | Safe R | February 24, 2022 |
| Fox News | Solid R | May 12, 2022 |
| DDHQ | Solid R | July 20, 2022 |
| 538 | Solid R | June 30, 2022 |
| The Economist | Safe R | September 7, 2022 |

=== Post-primary endorsements ===
Markwayne Mullin (R)

U.S. representatives

- Tulsi Gabbard, former U.S. representative for Hawaii's 2nd congressional district (2013–2021) (Independent)

Organizations

- Associated General Contractors of America
- Campaign for Working Families
- Citizens Against Government Waste
- National Rifle Association of America
- National Right to Life
- Oklahoma Farm Bureau
- Oklahoma Fraternal Order of Police
- Tea Party Express
Kendra Horn (D)

State legislators

- Kris Steele, speaker of the Oklahoma House of Representatives, speaker pro tempore of the Oklahoma House of Representatives and state representative for the 26th district (2001–2013) (Republican)

Organizations

- Brady Campaign
- Edmond Democratic Women
- League of Conservation Voters Action Fund
- National Education Association
- Sally's List

Newspapers

- Tulsa World

Individuals

- Seth MacFarlane, actor, singer, and writer
- Mark Ruffalo, actor

=== Polling ===
Aggregate polls

| Source of poll aggregation | Dates administered | Dates updated | Markwayne Mullin (R) | Kendra Horn (D) | Other (Note: Calculated by taking the difference of 100% and all other candidates combined.) | Margin |
|---|---|---|---|---|---|---|
| 270towin | October 11 – November 7, 2022 | November 7, 2022 | 53.0% | 39.8% | 7.2% | Mullin +13.2 |

Graphical summary

| Poll source | Date(s) administered | Sample size | Margin of error | Markwayne Mullin (R) | Kendra Horn (D) | Other | Undecided |
|---|---|---|---|---|---|---|---|
| Ascend Action (R) | November 5–6, 2022 | 682 (LV) | ± 3.8% | 53% | 41% | 3% (Note: Woods (I) with 2%; Murphy (L) with 1%) | 4% |
| Amber Integrated (R) | October 26–28, 2022 | 501 (LV) | ± 4.4% | 52% | 41% | 4% (Note: Murphy (L) with 2%; Woods (I) with 2%) | 2% |
| Emerson College | October 25–28, 2022 | 1,000 (LV) | ± 3.0% | 56% | 35% | 4% (Note: Woods (I) with 3%; Murphy (L) with 1%) | 5% |
| Emerson College | October 25–28, 2022 | 1,000 (LV) | ± 3.0% | 59% | 36% | 5% (Note: Woods (I) with 4%; Murphy (L) with 1%) | – |
| Ascend Action (R) | October 24–28, 2022 | 749 (LV) | ± 3.6% | 47% | 41% | 4% (Note: Murphy (L) with 2%; Woods (I) with 2%) | 8% |
| Amber Integrated (R) | October 13–15, 2022 | 500 (LV) | ± 4.4% | 52% | 39% | 5% (Note: Murphy (L) with 3%; Woods (I) with 2%) | 3% |
| Ascend Action (R) | October 10–12, 2022 | 638 (LV) | ± 3.9% | 50% | 39% | 1% (Note: Woods (I) with 1%; Murphy (L) with <1%) | 10% |
| SoonerPoll | October 3–6, 2022 | 301 (LV) | – | 51% | 42% | 3% (Note: Woods with 3%) | 4% |
| Amber Integrated (R) | September 19–21, 2022 | 500 (LV) | ± 4.4% | 50% | 39% | – | 11% |
| –(L) (Note: This poll was conducted in-house by and for Natalie Bruno's campaign for Governor) | September 15–18, 2022 | 2,989 (LV) | ± 3.2% | 49% | 37% | 5% (Note: Murphy with 4%; Woods with 1%) | 9% |
| SoonerPoll | September 2–7, 2022 | 402 (LV) | ± 4.9% | 52% | 40% | 4% (Note: Woods with 4%) | 4% |
| Echelon Insights | August 31 – September 7, 2022 | 522 (RV) | ± 6.3% | 58% | 28% | – | 13% |

=== Results ===
2022 United States Senate special election in Oklahoma
| Party | Candidate | Votes | % | ±% |
|---|---|---|---|---|
| Republican | Markwayne Mullin | 710,643 | 61.77% | −1.14% |
| Democratic | Kendra Horn | 405,389 | 35.24% | +2.49% |
| Libertarian | Robert Murphy | 17,386 | 1.51% | −0.70% |
| Independent | Ray Woods | 17,063 | 1.48% | N/A |
| Total votes | | 1,150,481 | 100.0% | |
| Turnout | | 1,150,481 | 50.11% | |
| Registered electors | | 2,295,906 | | |
| Republican hold | | | | |

==== By county ====
| County | Markwayne Mullin Republican | | Kendra Horn Democratic | | Various candidates Other parties | |
| County | # | % | # | % | # | % |
|---|---|---|---|---|---|---|
| Adair | 3,865 | 73.94% | 1,161 | 22.21% | 201 | 3.85% |
| Alfalfa | 1,450 | 83.67% | 240 | 13.85% | 43 | 2.48% |
| Atoka | 3,211 | 81.85% | 624 | 15.91% | 88 | 2.25% |
| Beaver | 1,482 | 87.69% | 151 | 8.93% | 57 | 3.37% |
| Beckham | 4,360 | 79.71% | 975 | 17.82% | 135 | 2.47% |
| Blaine | 2,215 | 74.70% | 661 | 22.29% | 89 | 3.00% |
| Bryan | 8,642 | 75.43% | 2,492 | 21.75% | 333 | 2.82% |
| Caddo | 4,689 | 66.49% | 2,170 | 30.77% | 193 | 2.73% |
| Canadian | 32,520 | 64.96% | 15,846 | 31.65% | 1,693 | 3.38% |
| Carter | 9,669 | 72.24% | 3,302 | 24.67% | 414 | 3.10% |
| Cherokee | 7,944 | 58.77% | 5,124 | 37.91% | 449 | 3.32% |
| Choctaw | 3,242 | 80.25% | 689 | 17.05% | 109 | 2.70% |
| Cimarron | 659 | 90.15% | 51 | 6.98% | 21 | 2.87% |
| Cleveland | 46,468 | 51.04% | 41,634 | 45.73% | 2,932 | 3.23% |
| Coal | 1,518 | 80.27% | 321 | 16.98% | 52 | 2.75% |
| Comanche | 13,850 | 58.94% | 8,661 | 36.86% | 989 | 4.21% |
| Cotton | 1,439 | 78.63% | 310 | 16.94% | 81 | 4.43% |
| Craig | 3,317 | 74.02% | 1,045 | 23.32% | 119 | 2.66% |
| Creek | 16,245 | 72.83% | 5,386 | 24.15% | 673 | 3.01% |
| Custer | 5,350 | 71.46% | 1,939 | 25.90% | 198 | 2.65% |
| Delaware | 9,928 | 75.18% | 2,938 | 22.25% | 239 | 2.57% |
| Dewey | 1,488 | 84.69% | 216 | 12.29% | 53 | 3.02% |
| Ellis | 1,258 | 84.77% | 191 | 12.87% | 35 | 2.36% |
| Garfield | 11,766 | 72.71% | 3,908 | 24.15% | 507 | 3.13% |
| Garvin | 6,112 | 75.33% | 1,779 | 21.93% | 223 | 2.75% |
| Grady | 13,253 | 74.44% | 4,079 | 22.91% | 472 | 2.66% |
| Grant | 1,267 | 79.49% | 271 | 17.00% | 56 | 3.51% |
| Greer | 1,011 | 75.50% | 289 | 21.58% | 39 | 2.91% |
| Harmon | 497 | 76.58% | 138 | 21.26% | 14 | 2.15% |
| Harper | 982 | 84.15% | 139 | 11.91% | 46 | 3.94% |
| Haskell | 2,645 | 78.12% | 676 | 19.96% | 65 | 1.92% |
| Hughes | 2,603 | 73.37% | 837 | 23.59% | 108 | 3.04% |
| Jackson | 4,262 | 77.69% | 1,044 | 19.03% | 180 | 3.28% |
| Jefferson | 1,269 | 79.36% | 278 | 17.39% | 52 | 3.25% |
| Johnston | 2,357 | 79.60% | 513 | 17.33% | 91 | 3.08% |
| Kay | 8,662 | 69.30% | 3,434 | 27.47% | 403 | 3.22% |
| Kingfisher | 3,942 | 80.89% | 808 | 16.58% | 123 | 2.52% |
| Kiowa | 1,794 | 73.08% | 615 | 25.05% | 46 | 1.88% |
| Latimer | 2,341 | 76.43% | 636 | 20.76% | 86 | 2.81% |
| LeFlore | 9,540 | 78.71% | 2,273 | 18.75% | 308 | 2.54% |
| Lincoln | 8,379 | 75.59% | 2,374 | 21.42% | 332 | 2.99% |
| Logan | 11,904 | 70.12% | 4,548 | 26.79% | 525 | 3.09% |
| Love | 2,152 | 78.80% | 497 | 18.20% | 82 | 3.00% |
| McClain | 11,107 | 73.99% | 3,500 | 23.31% | 405 | 2.70% |
| McCurtain | 6,703 | 81.19% | 1,345 | 16.29% | 208 | 2.52% |
| McIntosh | 4,485 | 69.43% | 1,803 | 27.91% | 168 | 2.66% |
| Major | 2,288 | 85.12% | 301 | 11.20% | 99 | 3.69% |
| Marshall | 3,436 | 78.36% | 832 | 18.97% | 117 | 2.69% |
| Mayes | 9,145 | 72.34% | 3,090 | 24.44% | 407 | 3.22% |
| Murray | 3,153 | 74.22% | 973 | 22.90% | 122 | 2.88% |
| Muskogee | 11,263 | 63.34% | 6,022 | 33.87% | 497 | 2.80% |
| Noble | 2,763 | 72.63% | 923 | 24.26% | 118 | 3.11% |
| Nowata | 2,631 | 79.22% | 613 | 18.46% | 77 | 2.31% |
| Okfuskee | 2,063 | 70.22% | 788 | 26.82% | 87 | 2.96% |
| Oklahoma | 103,019 | 46.43% | 112,532 | 50.72% | 6,311 | 2.84% |
| Okmulgee | 6,881 | 64.77% | 3,442 | 32.40% | 301 | 2.84% |
| Osage | 9,856 | 65.34% | 4,824 | 31.98% | 404 | 2.68% |
| Ottawa | 5,510 | 71.76% | 1,911 | 24.89% | 257 | 3.35% |
| Pawnee | 3,709 | 73.49% | 1,188 | 23.54% | 150 | 2.98% |
| Payne | 12,225 | 55.38% | 9,147 | 41.44% | 701 | 3.17% |
| Pittsburg | 9,412 | 74.18% | 2,979 | 23.48% | 298 | 2.35% |
| Pontotoc | 7,175 | 64.26% | 3,647 | 32.66% | 344 | 3.08% |
| Pottawatomie | 13,787 | 66.68% | 6,227 | 30.12% | 661 | 3.20% |
| Pushmataha | 2,683 | 81.62% | 532 | 16.18% | 72 | 2.20% |
| Roger Mills | 1,120 | 85.04% | 160 | 12.15% | 37 | 3.81% |
| Rogers | 24,637 | 72.69% | 8,221 | 24.26% | 1,046 | 3.06% |
| Seminole | 3,979 | 67.85% | 1,730 | 29.50% | 155 | 2.64% |
| Sequoyah | 7,671 | 74.80% | 2,288 | 22.31% | 297 | 2.89% |
| Stephens | 10,107 | 77.20% | 2,542 | 19.42% | 443 | 3.38% |
| Texas | 3,002 | 82.22% | 505 | 13.83% | 144 | 3.92% |
| Tillman | 1,388 | 75.43% | 393 | 21.36% | 59 | 3.21% |
| Tulsa | 103,578 | 53.55% | 84,017 | 43.44% | 5,830 | 3.01% |
| Wagoner | 18,977 | 70.70% | 7,084 | 26.39% | 780 | 2.91% |
| Washington | 12,132 | 71.01% | 4,452 | 26.06% | 502 | 2.94% |
| Washita | 2,829 | 79.31% | 643 | 18.03% | 95 | 2.67% |
| Woods | 2,040 | 75.58% | 575 | 21.30% | 84 | 3.11% |
| Woodward | 4,342 | 80.80% | 897 | 16.69% | 135 | 2.51% |
| Totals | 710,643 | 61.77% | 405,389 | 35.24% | 34,449 | 2.99% |

Counties that flipped from Republican to Democratic

- Oklahoma (largest city: Oklahoma City)

==== By congressional district ====
Mullin won all five congressional districts.

| District | Mullin | Horn | Representative |
|---|---|---|---|
| 1st | 56.5% | 40.5% | Kevin Hern |
| 2nd | 72.5% | 24.6% | Markwayne Mullin (117th Congress) |
| 2nd | 72.5% | 24.6% | Josh Brecheen (118th Congress) |
| 3rd | 67.3% | 29.6% | Frank Lucas |
| 4th | 60.3% | 36.5% | Tom Cole |
| 5th | 53.8% | 43.4% | Stephanie Bice |

== See also ==
- 2022 United States Senate elections
- 2022 Oklahoma elections
- 118th United States Congress
- List of special elections to the United States Senate
