= 2022 United States Senate election in Oklahoma =

- November 8, 2022
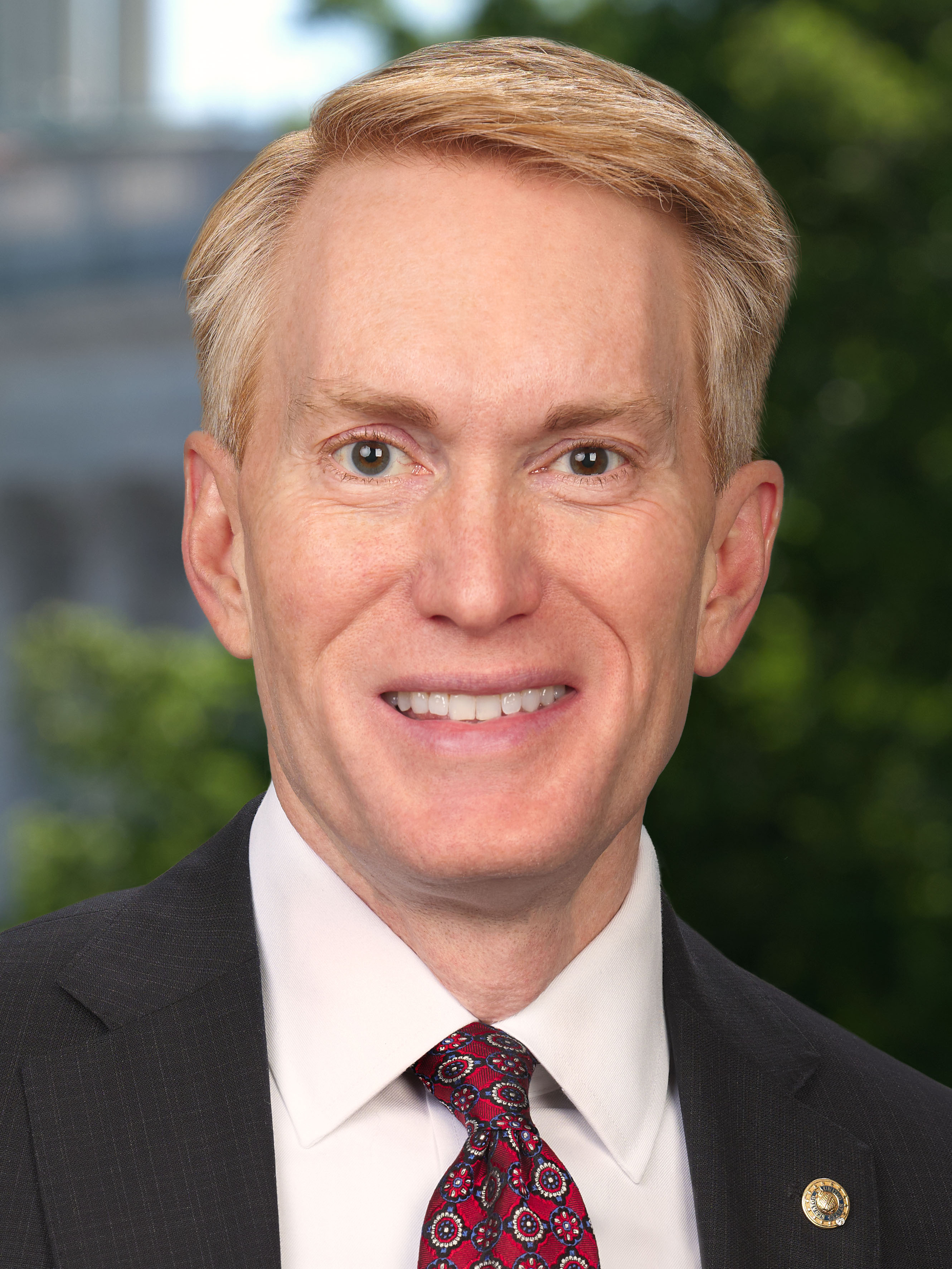

| Nominee | James Lankford | Madison Horn |
| Party | Republican | Democratic |
| Popular vote | 739,960 | 369,370 |
| Percentage | 64.30% | 32.10% |
- Lankford: 40–50% 50–60% 60–70% 70–80% 80–90% >90% Horn: 40–50% 50–60% 60–70% 70–80% 80–90% >90% Tie: 40–50% 50% No votes
U.S. senator before election
James Lankford
Republican
Elected U.S. senator
James Lankford
Republican

The 2022 United States Senate election in Oklahoma was held on November 8, 2022, to elect a member of the United States Senate to represent the State of Oklahoma. Incumbent senator James Lankford won re-election to a second full term, defeating cybersecurity professional Madison Horn (no relation to former U.S. Representative Kendra Horn, who ran for the concurrent special election to the Class II seat) in a landslide, winning all 77 counties with more than 50% of the vote in each.

Lankford was first elected in 2014 special election with 68% of the vote, succeeding retiring fellow Republican Tom Coburn. He won re-election to a first full term in 2016 with 68% of the vote.

The primary elections for the Republican, Democratic, and Libertarian parties' nominations took place on June 28, 2022, with runoffs taking place on August 23, 2022. All candidates had to file between the days of April 13–15, 2022.

Despite his comfortable victory, with slightly over 64% of the vote received this was Lankford's worst performance in his career, as in each of his previous two elections he won nearly 68%. This also marked the best performance by a Democratic candidate since 2004 in the Class III seat.

== Republican primary ==
On March 16, 2021, Jackson Lahmeyer announced his campaign for the Republican nomination for United States Senate seat held by James Lankford. While Lankford had not formally announced, he was expected to run for reelection. On April 6, Lankford officially announced he would seek reelection in an interview with the Tulsa World. The Oklahoman reported that Joan Farr announced her candidacy for the Oklahoma and Kansas U.S. Senate seats sometime in August. On September 28, state senator Nathan Dahm announced his campaign for Lankford's seat. In November the Tulsa World reported that Jessica Jean Garrison, the daughter of former state senator Earl Garrison, would also campaign in the contested Republican primary. On February 28, 2022, Nathan Dahm announced he had switched his campaign to the special election in the Class 2 seat. Jessica Jean Garrison also switched her campaign to the special election when filing. Lankford won the June primary with 67% of the vote.

=== Candidates ===
==== Nominee ====
- James Lankford, incumbent U.S. senator

==== Eliminated in primary ====
- Joan Farr, independent candidate for the U.S. Senate in 2014 and 2020
- Jackson Lahmeyer, pastor for Sheridan Church, former Oklahoma state coordinator for Billy Graham Evangelistic Association, and former crusade director for Christ for All Nations

==== Withdrew before filing ====
- Nathan Dahm, state senator for the 33rd district (2013–2024) (ran for the Class 2 U.S. Senate seat)
- Jessica Jean Garrison, author, dietician, and daughter of former State Senator Earl Garrison (ran for the Class 2 U.S. Senate seat)

=== Endorsements ===
James Lankford and Jackson Lahmeyer courted the endorsement of Donald Trump, 45th president of the United States, but Trump did not endorse a candidate prior to the primary.

On June 29, 2021, Lankford's campaign published its supposed endorsement by State Representative Kevin McDugle. McDugle later posted on social media claiming to have never made the endorsement; Lankford's campaign subsequently removed his name from their endorsement list.

Jackson Lahmeyer

Federal executive branch officials

- Michael Flynn, 25th U.S. national security advisor (2017) and convicted felon (Democrat)
- Sebastian Gorka, former deputy assistant to the president for the Trump administration (2017)

State senators

- Warren Hamilton, Oklahoma state senator from the 7th district (2021–present)
- Wendy Rogers, Arizona state senator from the 6th district (2021–present)

State representatives

- John R. Bennett, chairman of the Oklahoma Republican Party (2021–2022) and former state representative for the 2nd district (2011–2019)

Mayors

- Rudy Giuliani, 107th mayor of New York City (1994–2001)

Individuals

- Mike Lindell, conspiracy theorist and My Pillow founder
- Greg Locke, pastor and COVID-19 misinformation conspiracy theorist
- Mark McCloskey, 2022 U.S. Senate candidate in the Missouri Republican primary and subject of the St. Louis gun-toting controversy
- Roger Stone, conservative political consultant, lobbyist, and long-time Donald Trump ally
- Ken Warner, Oklahoma County Republican Party chairman
- Lin Wood, attorney and conspiracy theorist

Organizations

- Cimarron County Republican Party
- Health Freedom and Parental Rights, an anti-vaccination group
- Logan County Republican Party
- Oil and Gas Workers Association
- Oklahoma Second Amendment Association, a pro-second amendment organization
- Oklahomans for Health and Parental Rights
- Republicans for National Renewal
James Lankford

U.S. senators

- Ted Cruz, U.S. senator from Texas (2013–present)
- Jim Inhofe, U.S. senator from Oklahoma (1994–2023)
- Mike Lee, U.S. senator from Utah (2011–present)
- Tim Scott, U.S. senator from South Carolina (2013–present)

U.S. representatives

- Stephanie Bice, U.S. representative for Oklahoma's 5th congressional district (2021–present)
- Jim Bridenstine, former U.S. representative for Oklahoma's 1st congressional district (2013–2018) and 13th administrator of NASA (2018–2021)
- Tom Cole, U.S. representative for Oklahoma's 4th congressional district (2003–present)
- Newt Gingrich, 50th speaker of the United States House of Representatives from Georgia's 6th congressional district (1979–1999)
- Frank Lucas, U.S. representative for Oklahoma's 3rd congressional district (1994–present)
- Markwayne Mullin, U.S. representative for Oklahoma's 2nd congressional district (2013–2023)

Statewide elected officials

- Bob Anthony, Oklahoma corporate commissioner (1989–2025)
- Cindy Byrd, Oklahoma state auditor and inspector (2019–present)
- Todd Hiett, Oklahoma corporate commissioner (2015–present)
- Joy Hofmeister, Oklahoma state superintendent (2015–2023) (Democrat)
- Glen Mulready, Oklahoma insurance commissioner (2019–present)
- Dana Murphy, Oklahoma corporate commissioner (2009–2023)
- Leslie Osborn, Oklahoma labor commissioner (2019–present)
- Matt Pinnell, lieutenant governor of Oklahoma (2019–present)
- Kevin Stitt, governor of Oklahoma (2019–present)

State senators

- Mark Allen, state senator from the 4th district (2010–2022)
- Micheal Bergstrom, state senator from the 1st district (2016–present)
- Bill Coleman, state senator from the 10th district (2018–present)
- Julie Daniels, state senator from the 29th district (2016–present)
- Kim David, state senator from the 18th district (2010–2022)
- Tom J. Dugger, state senator from the 21st district (2016–2024)
- John Haste, state senator from the 36th district (2018–present)
- Brent Howard, state senator from the 28th district (2018–present)
- Darcy Jech, state senator from the 26th district (2014–present)
- Shane Jett, state senator from the 17th district (2021–present)
- Greg McCortney, state senator from the 13th district (2016–2024)
- John Montgomery, state senator from the 32nd district (2018–2023)
- Casey Murdock, state senator from the 27th district (2018–present)
- Roland Pederson, state senator from the 19th district (2016–present)
- Dewayne Pemberton, state senator from the 9th district (2016–2024)
- Adam Pugh, state senator from the 41st district (2016–present)
- Marty Quinn, state senator from the 2nd district (2014–2022)
- David Rader, state senator from the 39th district (2016–present)
- Paul Rosino, state senator from the 45th district (2017–present)
- Frank Simpson, state senator from the 14th district (2010–2022)
- Brenda Stanley, state senator from the 14th district (2019–present)
- Roger Thompson, state senator from the 8th district (2014–2018)
- Greg Treat, president pro tempore of the Oklahoma Senate and state senator from the 47th district (2011–2024)
- Darrell Weaver, state senator from the 24th district (2018–present)

State representatives

- Charles McCall, speaker of the Oklahoma House of Representatives and state representative for the 22nd district (2013–2024)
- Rhonda Baker, state representative for the 60th district (2016–2024)
- Jeff Boatman, state representative for the 67th district (2018–2024)
- Brad Boles, state representative for the 51st district (2018–present)
- Ty Burns, state representative for the 35th district (2018–2025)
- Chad Caldwell, state representative for the 40th district (2014–present)
- Trey Caldwell, state representative for the 63rd district (2019–present)
- Eddy Dempsey, state representative for the 1st district (2021–present)
- Sheila Dills, state representative for the 69th district (2018–2022)
- Mike Dobrinski, state representative for the 59th district (2020–present)
- Jon Echols, state representative for the 90th district (2012–2024)
- Scott Fetgatter, state representative for the 16th district (2016–present)
- Avery Frix, state representative for the 13th district (2016–2022)
- Toni Hasenbeck, state representative for the 65th district (2018–present)
- Kyle Hilbert, state representative for the 29th district (2016–present)
- Justin Humphrey, state representative for the 19th district (2016–present)
- Chris Kannady, state representative for the 91st district (2014–present)
- Gerrid Kendrix, state representative for the 52nd district (2021–present)
- Dell Kerbs, state representative for the 26th district (2016–present)
- Mark Lawson, state representative for the 30th district (2016–present)
- Mark Lepak, state representative for the 9th district (2014–present)
- Robert Manger, state representative for the 101st district (2018–present)
- Ryan Martinez, state representative for the 39th district (2016–2023)
- Stan May, state representative for the 80th district (2018–present)
- Mark McBride, state representative for the 53rd district (2012–2024)
- Nicole Miller, state representative for the 82nd district (2019–present)
- Garry Mize, state representative for the 31st district (2018–2022)
- Anthony Moore, state representative for the 57th district (2020–present)
- Carl Newton, state representative for the 58th district (2016–present)
- Jadine Nollan, state representative for the 66th district (2011–2022)
- Terry O'Donnell, state representative for the 23rd district (2013–2024)
- Mike Osburn, state representative for the 81st district (2016–present)
- Daniel Pae, state representative for the 62nd district (2018–present)
- Kenton Patzkowsky, state representative for the 61st district (2018–present)
- Logan Phillips, state representative for the 24th district (2018–2022)
- Dustin Roberts, state representative for the 21st district (2011–2022)
- Todd Russ, state representative for the 55th district (2010–2022)
- Marilyn Stark, state representative for the 100th district (2018–present)
- Danny Sterling, state representative for the 27th district (2018–present)
- Preston Stinson, state representative for the 96th district (2021–present)
- Judd Strom, state representative for the 10th district (2018–present)
- Tammy Townley, state representative for the 48th district (2018–present)
- Josh West, state representative for the 5th district (2017–present)
- Tammy West, state representative for the 84th district (2016–present)

Individuals

- Andrew Brunson, pastor
- Marjorie Dannenfelser, president of the Susan B. Anthony List (2006–present)
- James Dobson, founder and former head of Focus on the Family (1977–2010)
- Matt Schlapp, chairman of the American Conservative Union
- Thomas P. Stafford, astronaut

Newspapers

- Tulsa Beacon

Organizations

- Conservative Political Action Conference
- Family Policy Alliance
- Family Research Council Action PAC
- International Franchise Association
- National Federation of Independent Business
- National Rifle Association - Political Victory Fund
- National Right to Life Committee
- Oklahoma Farm Bureau
- Pro-Israel America
- Susan B. Anthony List, an anti-abortion PAC

Labor unions

- National Border Patrol Council, United States Border Patrol Union

=== Debates ===
The Oil & Gas Workers Association of Oklahoma offered to host a debate for the Republican primary. Invitations were extended to candidates Jackson Lahmeyer and James Lankford, but Lankford refused the invitation.

2022 Republican primary debates
| No. | Date | Host | Moderator | Link | Participants | | |
Key: P Participant A Absent N Non-invitee I Invitee W Withdrawn
| Key: P Participant A Absent N Non-invitee I Invitee W Withdrawn | | | | | Joan Farr | Jackson Lahmeyer | James Lankford |
|---|---|---|---|---|---|---|---|
| 1 | Cancelled | Oil & Gas Workers Association of Oklahoma | - | - | N | I | I |

=== Polling ===
| Poll source | Date(s) administered | Sample size (Note: Key: A – all adults RV – registered voters LV – likely voters V – unclear) | Margin of error | Joan Farr | Jackson Lahmeyer | James Lankford | Other | Undecided |
|---|---|---|---|---|---|---|---|---|
| Amber Integrated (R) | June 6–9, 2022 | 400 (LV) | ± 4.9% | 4% | 12% | 68% | – | 15% |
| SoonerPoll | April 25 – May 11, 2022 | 306 (LV) | ± 5.6% | 2% | 8% | 74% | – | 16% |
| Amber Integrated (R) | March 24–27, 2022 | 455 (LV) | ± 4.6% | 0% | 10% | 63% | 3% (Note: Garrison with 3%) | 24% |
| Amber Integrated (R) | December 15–19, 2021 | 253 (RV) | ± 6.2% | – | 8% | 56% | 12% (Note: Dahm with 9%, "Other" with 3%) | 24% |
| Amber Integrated (R) | September 29 – October 3, 2021 | 253 (RV) | ± 6.2% | – | 21% | 62% | 4% (Note: Dahm with 3%, "Other" with 1%) | 12% |

=== Results ===
Primary results by county: Lankford: 40–50%; 50–60%; 60–70%; 70–80%

Republican primary results
| Party | Candidate | Votes | % |
|---|---|---|---|
| Republican | James Lankford (incumbent) | 243,132 | 67.83% |
| Republican | Jackson Lahmeyer | 94,572 | 26.38% |
| Republican | Joan Farr | 20,761 | 5.79% |
| Total votes | | 358,465 | 100.0% |

== Democratic primary ==
=== Candidates ===
==== Nominee ====
- Madison Horn, cybersecurity professional

==== Eliminated in runoff ====
- Jason Bollinger, attorney and former State Department employee

==== Eliminated in initial primary ====
- Arya Azma, security trader
- Dennis Baker
- Jo Glenn, attorney
- Brandon Wade, machinery assembler

==== Failed to file ====
- Bevon Rogers, businessman and 2020 candidate for Oklahoma Senate

==== Declined ====
- Kendra Horn, former U.S. representative (running in the concurrent special election for the Class 2 seat)

=== First round ===
==== Results ====
Initial primary results by county: Horn: 20–30%; 30–40%; 40–50%; Bollinger: 20–30%; 30–40%; Baker: 20–30%; Wade: 20–30%

Democratic primary results
| Party | Candidate | Votes | % |
|---|---|---|---|
| Democratic | Madison Horn | 60,691 | 37.19% |
| Democratic | Jason Bollinger | 27,374 | 16.77% |
| Democratic | Dennis Baker | 22,467 | 13.77% |
| Democratic | Jo Glenn | 21,198 | 12.99% |
| Democratic | Brandon Wade | 19,986 | 12.25% |
| Democratic | Arya Azma | 11,478 | 7.03% |
| Total votes | | 163,194 | 100.0% |

=== Runoff ===
==== Results ====
Runoff primary results by county: Horn: 50–60%; 60–70%; 70–80%; Bollinger: 50–60%; 60–70%

Democratic primary results
| Party | Candidate | Votes | % |
|---|---|---|---|
| Democratic | Madison Horn | 60,929 | 65.48% |
| Democratic | Jason Bollinger | 32,121 | 34.52% |
| Total votes | | 93,050 | 100.0% |

== General election ==
=== Predictions ===
| Source | Ranking | As of |
|---|---|---|
| The Cook Political Report | Solid R | November 19, 2021 |
| Inside Elections | Solid R | January 7, 2022 |
| Sabato's Crystal Ball | Safe R | November 3, 2021 |
| Politico | Solid R | April 1, 2022 |
| RCP | Safe R | January 10, 2022 |
| Fox News | Solid R | May 12, 2022 |
| DDHQ | Solid R | July 20, 2022 |
| 538 | Solid R | June 30, 2022 |
| The Economist | Safe R | September 7, 2022 |

=== Post-primary endorsements ===
James Lankford (R)

U.S. executive branch officials

- Donald Trump, 45th president of the United States (2017–2021)

Newspapers

- Tulsa World
Madison Horn (D)

Organizations

- National Women's Political Caucus
- No Dem Left Behind PAC
- Oklahoma Democratic Veterans Committee
- Sally's List
- Vote Common Good

Labor unions

- Communications Workers of America

Newspapers

- The Black Wall Street Times

=== Polling ===
Aggregate polls

| Source of poll aggregation | Dates administered | Dates updated | James Lankford (R) | Madison Horn (D) | Other (Note: Calculated by taking the difference of 100% and all other candidates combined.) | Margin |
|---|---|---|---|---|---|---|
| FiveThirtyEight | September 15 – November 7, 2022 | November 7, 2022 | 56.9% | 34.9% | 8.2% | Lankford +22.0 |
| 270towin | October 11 - November 7, 2022 | November 7, 2022 | 54.3% | 36.8% | 8.9% | Lankford +17.5 |
| Average | | | 55.6% | 35.8% | 8.6% | Lankford +19.8 |

Graphical summary

| Poll source | Date(s) administered | Sample size | Margin of error | James Lankford (R) | Madison Horn (D) | Other | Undecided |
|---|---|---|---|---|---|---|---|
| Ascend Action (R) | November 5–6, 2022 | 682 (LV) | ± 3.8% | 56% | 36% | 3% (Note: Delaney (I) with 2%; Blevins (L) with 1%) | 4% |
| Amber Integrated (R) | October 26–28, 2022 | 501 (LV) | ± 4.4% | 52% | 38% | 7% (Note: Delaney (I) with 4%; Blevins (L) with 3%) | 3% |
| Emerson College | October 25–28, 2022 | 1,000 (LV) | ± 3.0% | 57% | 33% | 3% (Note: Delaney (I) with 2%; Blevins (L) with 1%) | 8% |
| Emerson College | October 25–28, 2022 | 1,000 (LV) | ± 3.0% | 62% | 34% | 4% (Note: Delaney (I) with 3%; Blevins (L) with 1%) | – |
| Ascend Action (R) | October 24–28, 2022 | 749 (LV) | ± 3.6% | 51% | 35% | 5% (Note: Delaney (I) with 3%; Blevins (L) with 2%) | 9% |
| Amber Integrated (R) | October 13–15, 2022 | 500 (LV) | ± 4.4% | 52% | 36% | 7% (Note: Delaney (I) with 4%; Blevins (L) with 3%) | 4% |
| Ascend Action (R) | October 10–12, 2022 | 638 (LV) | ± 3.9% | 51% | 37% | 3% (Note: Delaney (I) with 2%; Blevins (L) with 1%) | 9% |
| SoonerPoll | October 3–6, 2022 | 301 (LV) | – | 52% | 40% | 2% (Note: Delaney with 2%; Blevins with 0%) | 6% |
| Amber Integrated (R) | September 19–21, 2022 | 500 (LV) | ± 4.4% | 52% | 34% | – | 14% |
| –(L) (Note: This poll was conducted in-house by and for Natalie Bruno's campaign for Governor) | September 15–18, 2022 | 2,989 (LV) | ± 3.2% | 49% | 27% | 11% (Note: Blevins with 9%; Delaney with 2%) | 13% |
| SoonerPoll | September 2–7, 2022 | 402 (LV) | ± 4.9% | 52% | 35% | 4% (Note: Delaney with 4%) | 13% |
| Echelon Insights | August 31 – September 7, 2022 | 522 (RV) | ± 6.3% | 59% | 29% | – | 12% |

=== Results ===
2022 United States Senate election in Oklahoma
| Party | Candidate | Votes | % | ±% |
|---|---|---|---|---|
| Republican | James Lankford (incumbent) | 739,960 | 64.30% | −3.44% |
| Democratic | Madison Horn | 369,370 | 32.10% | +7.52% |
| Independent | Michael Delaney | 20,907 | 1.82% | N/A |
| Libertarian | Kenneth Blevins | 20,495 | 1.78% | −1.22% |
| Total votes | | 1,150,732 | 100.0% | |
| Turnout | | 1,150,732 | 50.12% | |
| Registered electors | | 2,295,906 | | |
| Republican hold | | | | |

==== By county ====
| County | James Lankford Republican | | Madison Horn Democratic | | Various candidates Other parties | | Margin | | Total |
| County | # | % | # | % | # | % | # | % | Total |
|---|---|---|---|---|---|---|---|---|---|
| Adair | 3,652 | 70.3% | 1,376 | 26.5% | 167 | 2.2% | 2,276 | 63.00% | 5,195 |
| Alfalfa | 1,490 | 85.9% | 173 | 10.0% | 72 | 4.1% | 1,317 | 75.9% | 1,735 |
| Atoka | 3,204 | 82.0% | 605 | 15.5% | 100 | 2.6% | 2,599 | 66.5% | 3,909 |
| Beaver | 1,467 | 87.3% | 135 | 8.0% | 79 | 4.7% | 1,332 | 79.3% | 1,681 |
| Beckham | 4,508 | 82.4% | 807 | 14.8% | 153 | 2.8% | 3,701 | 67.6% | 5,468 |
| Blaine | 2,303 | 77.6% | 538 | 18.1% | 128 | 4.3% | 1,765 | 59.5% | 2,969 |
| Bryan | 8,743 | 76.4% | 2,330 | 20.3% | 378 | 3.3% | 6,413 | 56.1% | 11,451 |
| Caddo | 5,022 | 71.2% | 1,792 | 25.4% | 238 | 3.4% | 3,230 | 45.8% | 7,052 |
| Canadian | 34,207 | 68.3% | 13,867 | 27.7% | 2,023 | 4.0% | 20,340 | 40.6% | 50,097 |
| Carter | 9,829 | 73.5% | 3,076 | 23.0% | 476 | 3.5% | 6,753 | 50.5% | 13,381 |
| Cherokee | 8,106 | 60.0% | 4,905 | 36.3% | 500 | 3.7% | 3,201 | 23.7% | 13,511 |
| Choctaw | 3,238 | 80.2% | 666 | 16.5% | 132 | 3.3% | 2,572 | 63.7% | 4,036 |
| Cimarron | 651 | 89.3% | 38 | 5.2% | 40 | 5.5% | 613 | 84.1% | 729 |
| Cleveland | 49,400 | 54.2% | 38,150 | 41.9% | 3,535 | 3.9% | 11,250 | 12.3% | 91,085 |
| Coal | 1,497 | 79.4% | 333 | 17.7% | 55 | 2.9% | 1,164 | 61.7% | 1,885 |
| Comanche | 14,473 | 61.5% | 7,983 | 33.9% | 1,094 | 4.6% | 6,490 | 27.6% | 23,550 |
| Cotton | 1,498 | 81.3% | 252 | 13.7% | 93 | 5.0% | 1,246 | 67.6% | 1,843 |
| Craig | 3,338 | 74.6% | 975 | 21.8% | 159 | 3.5% | 2,363 | 52.8% | 4,472 |
| Creek | 16,482 | 73.9% | 4,942 | 22.2% | 879 | 3.9% | 11,540 | 51.7% | 22,303 |
| Custer | 5,698 | 76.0% | 1,567 | 20.9% | 228 | 3.0% | 4,131 | 55.1% | 7,493 |
| Delaware | 10,101 | 76.6% | 2,724 | 20.7% | 366 | 2.8% | 7,377 | 55.9% | 13,191 |
| Dewey | 1,534 | 87.0% | 160 | 9.1% | 70 | 4.0% | 1,374 | 77.9% | 1,764 |
| Ellis | 1,297 | 87.3% | 152 | 10.2% | 37 | 2.5% | 1,145 | 77.1% | 1,486 |
| Garfield | 12,215 | 75.5% | 3,297 | 20.4% | 674 | 4.1% | 8,918 | 55.1% | 16,186 |
| Garvin | 6,314 | 77.9% | 1,519 | 18.7% | 275 | 3.4% | 4,795 | 59.2% | 8,108 |
| Grady | 13,847 | 77.8% | 3,363 | 18.9% | 588 | 3.3% | 10,484 | 58.9% | 17,798 |
| Grant | 1,321 | 82.8% | 207 | 13.0% | 68 | 4.3% | 1,114 | 69.8% | 1,596 |
| Greer | 1,049 | 78.2% | 241 | 18.0% | 52 | 3.9% | 808 | 60.2% | 1,342 |
| Harmon | 523 | 80.8% | 113 | 17.5% | 11 | 1.7% | 410 | 63.3% | 647 |
| Harper | 998 | 85.6% | 111 | 9.5% | 57 | 4.9% | 887 | 76.1% | 1,166 |
| Haskell | 2,675 | 79.0% | 633 | 18.7% | 77 | 2.2% | 2,042 | 60.3% | 3,385 |
| Hughes | 2,666 | 75.4% | 722 | 20.4% | 150 | 4.3% | 1,944 | 55.0% | 3,538 |
| Jackson | 4,372 | 79.5% | 912 | 16.6% | 213 | 3.9% | 3,460 | 62.9% | 5,497 |
| Jefferson | 1,281 | 79.7% | 253 | 15.7% | 74 | 4.6% | 1,028 | 64.0% | 1,608 |
| Johnston | 2,373 | 80.2% | 490 | 16.6% | 95 | 3.2% | 1,883 | 63.6% | 2,958 |
| Kay | 8,993 | 71.9% | 3,039 | 24.3% | 474 | 3.8% | 5,954 | 47.6% | 12,506 |
| Kingfisher | 4,062 | 83.3% | 627 | 12.9% | 186 | 3.8% | 3,435 | 70.4% | 4,875 |
| Kiowa | 1,916 | 77.9% | 496 | 20.2% | 46 | 1.9% | 1,420 | 57.7% | 2,458 |
| Latimer | 2,332 | 76.3% | 601 | 19.7% | 124 | 4.1% | 1,731 | 56.6% | 3,057 |
| LeFlore | 9,469 | 78.2% | 2,232 | 18.4% | 404 | 3.3% | 7,237 | 59.8% | 12,105 |
| Lincoln | 8,648 | 78.0% | 1,980 | 17.9% | 456 | 4.1% | 6,668 | 60.1% | 11,084 |
| Logan | 12,310 | 72.5% | 3,985 | 23.5% | 684 | 4.0% | 8,325 | 49.0% | 16,979 |
| Love | 2,174 | 79.5% | 473 | 17.3% | 88 | 3.2% | 1,701 | 62.2% | 2,735 |
| McClain | 11,520 | 76.7% | 2,988 | 19.9% | 520 | 3.5% | 8,532 | 56.8% | 15,028 |
| McCurtain | 6,644 | 80.7% | 1,326 | 16.1% | 260 | 3.2% | 5,318 | 64.6% | 8,230 |
| McIntosh | 4,587 | 71.2% | 1,676 | 26.0% | 181 | 2.8% | 2,911 | 45.2% | 6,444 |
| Major | 2,328 | 86.5% | 238 | 8.8% | 124 | 4.6% | 2,090 | 77.7% | 2,690 |
| Marshall | 3,484 | 79.4% | 788 | 18.0% | 116 | 2.6% | 2,696 | 61.4% | 4,388 |
| Mayes | 9,259 | 73.3% | 2,851 | 22.6% | 517 | 4.1% | 6,408 | 50.7% | 12,627 |
| Murray | 3,242 | 76.4% | 833 | 19.6% | 167 | 4.0% | 2,409 | 56.8% | 4,242 |
| Muskogee | 11,504 | 64.8% | 5,641 | 31.8% | 619 | 3.5% | 5,863 | 33.0% | 17,764 |
| Noble | 2,864 | 75.2% | 784 | 20.6% | 163 | 4.3% | 2,080 | 54.6% | 3,811 |
| Nowata | 2,611 | 78.8% | 577 | 17.4% | 124 | 3.8% | 2,034 | 61.4% | 3,312 |
| Okfuskee | 2,085 | 71.0% | 727 | 24.8% | 125 | 4.2% | 1,358 | 56.2% | 2,937 |
| Oklahoma | 112,093 | 50.5% | 102,417 | 46.1% | 7,486 | 3.3% | 9,676 | 4.4% | 221,996 |
| Okmulgee | 6,977 | 65.7% | 3,246 | 30.6% | 396 | 3.7% | 3,731 | 35.1% | 10,619 |
| Osage | 9,987 | 66.2% | 4,531 | 30.1% | 560 | 3.7% | 5,456 | 36.1% | 15,078 |
| Ottawa | 5,534 | 72.2% | 1,842 | 24.0% | 294 | 3.9% | 3,692 | 48.2% | 7,670 |
| Pawnee | 3,752 | 74.3% | 1,087 | 21.5% | 210 | 4.2% | 2,665 | 52.8% | 5,049 |
| Payne | 13,121 | 59.4% | 8,167 | 37.0% | 810 | 3.7% | 4,954 | 22.4% | 22,098 |
| Pittsburg | 9,450 | 74.6% | 2,839 | 22.4% | 382 | 3.1% | 6,611 | 52.2% | 12,671 |
| Pontotoc | 7,539 | 67.4% | 3,239 | 28.9% | 413 | 3.7% | 4,300 | 38.5% | 11,191 |
| Pottawatomie | 14,484 | 70.0% | 5,383 | 26.0% | 817 | 4.0% | 9,101 | 44.0% | 20,684 |
| Pushmataha | 2,656 | 80.9% | 532 | 16.2% | 94 | 2.9% | 2,124 | 64.7% | 3,282 |
| Roger Mills | 1,139 | 86.7% | 119 | 9.1% | 56 | 4.3% | 1,020 | 77.6% | 1,314 |
| Rogers | 25,065 | 74.0% | 7,525 | 22.2% | 1,286 | 3.8% | 17,540 | 51.8% | 33,876 |
| Seminole | 4,184 | 71.4% | 1,483 | 25.3% | 191 | 3.2% | 2,701 | 46.1% | 5,858 |
| Sequoyah | 7,669 | 74.9% | 2,224 | 21.7% | 351 | 3.4% | 5,445 | 53.2% | 10,244 |
| Stephens | 10,292 | 78.5% | 2,260 | 17.2% | 555 | 4.2% | 8,032 | 61.3% | 13,107 |
| Texas | 3,018 | 82.6% | 453 | 12.4% | 181 | 5.0% | 2,565 | 70.2% | 3,652 |
| Tillman | 1,444 | 78.3% | 330 | 17.9% | 70 | 3.8% | 1,114 | 60.4% | 1,844 |
| Tulsa | 108,757 | 56.2% | 78,231 | 40.4% | 6,550 | 3.4% | 30,526 | 15.8% | 193,538 |
| Wagoner | 19,333 | 72.1% | 6,511 | 24.3% | 979 | 3.7% | 12,822 | 47.8% | 26,823 |
| Washington | 12,470 | 72.9% | 4,010 | 23.5% | 618 | 3.6% | 8,460 | 49.4% | 17,098 |
| Washita | 2,995 | 83.9% | 465 | 13.0% | 111 | 3.1% | 2,530 | 70.9% | 3,571 |
| Woods | 2,149 | 79.6% | 468 | 17.3% | 82 | 3.0% | 1,681 | 62.3% | 2,699 |
| Woodward | 4,448 | 82.6% | 739 | 13.7% | 196 | 3.6% | 3,709 | 68.9% | 5,383 |
| Totals | 739,960 | 64.3% | 369,370 | 32.1% | 41,402 | 3.6% | 370,590 | 32.2% | 1,150,732 |

==== By congressional district ====
Lankford won all five congressional districts.

| District | Lankford | Horn | Representative |
|---|---|---|---|
| 1st | 59.0% | 37.6% | Kevin Hern |
| 2nd | 73.3% | 23.3% | Markwayne Mullin (117th Congress) |
| 2nd | 73.3% | 23.3% | Josh Brecheen (118th Congress) |
| 3rd | 70.0% | 26.1% | Frank Lucas |
| 4th | 63.1% | 33.0% | Tom Cole |
| 5th | 57.6% | 38.9% | Stephanie Bice |

== See also ==
- 2022 United States Senate elections
- 2022 Oklahoma elections
- 118th United States Congress
