= Rebecca Hamilton =

Rebecca Hamilton may refer to:

- Becca Hamilton (Rebecca Lynn Hamilton, born 1990), American curler
- Rebecca Hamilton (politician) (born 1948), American politician in Oklahoma
