= Jose Cruz (Oklahoma politician) =

American attorney and former politician

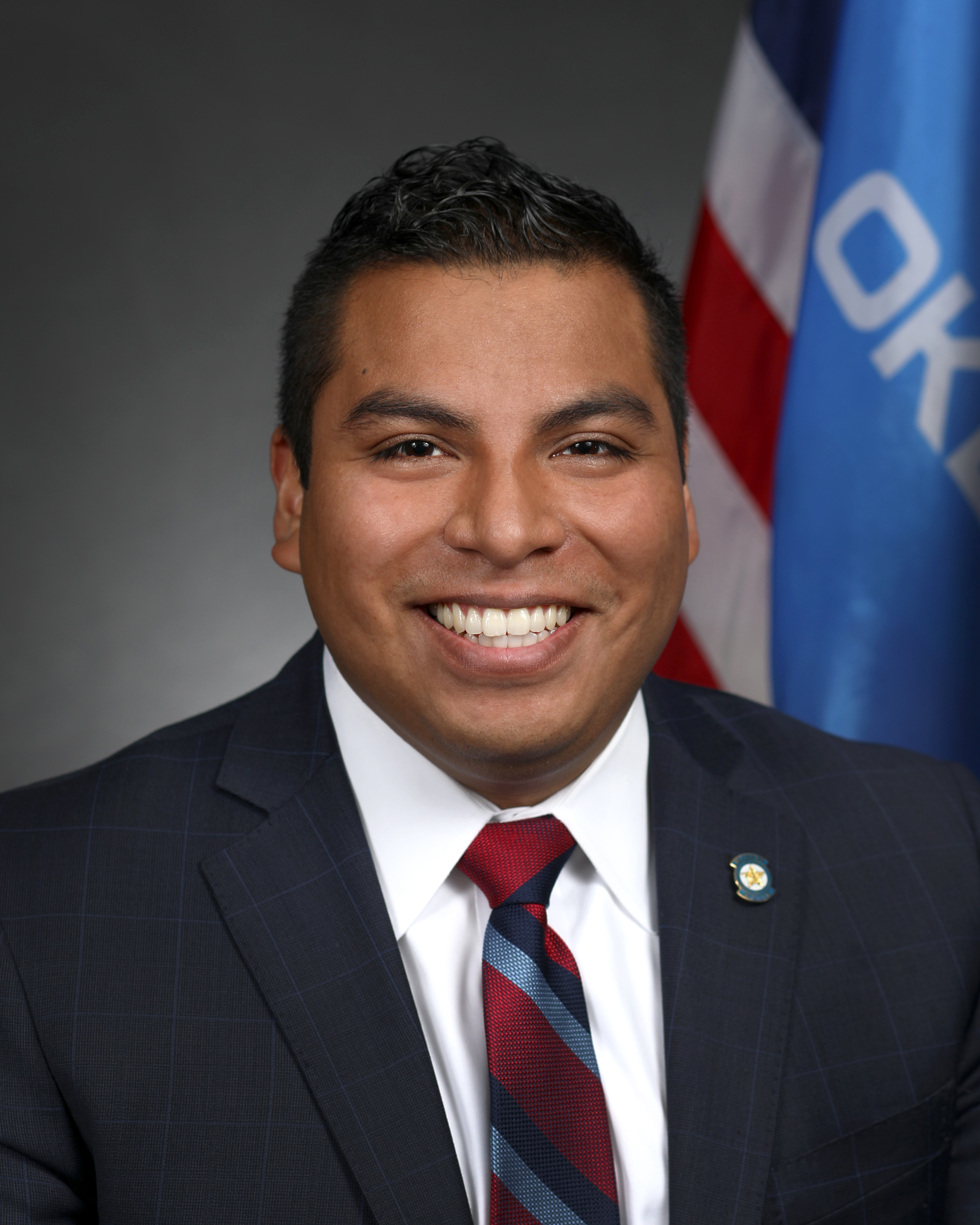

Member of the Oklahoma House of Representatives from the 89th district
- In office November 11, 2020 – January 21, 2022
- Preceded by: Shane Stone
- Succeeded by: Arturo Alonso

Personal details
- Born: Mexico City, Mexico
- Party: Democratic
- Education: Oklahoma Christian University (BS); Oklahoma City University (JD)

Jose Cruz is an American attorney and former politician who served as a member of the Oklahoma House of Representatives from the 89th district from November 2020 to January 2022.

== Early life and education ==
Jose Cruz was born in Mexico City. He was raised in Chicago. He earned a Bachelor of Science degree in mass communication and media studies from Oklahoma Christian University and a Juris Doctor from the Oklahoma City University School of Law.

== Career ==
=== Prior to Oklahoma House of Representatives ===
From 2012 to 2014, Cruz worked as a financial representative for Northwestern Mutual. In 2014 and 2015, he managed Michael Brooks-Jimenez's successful campaign for the Oklahoma Senate. He also worked as a legal assistant for Brooks-Jimenez's law firm. Cruz then joined the office of Congresswoman Kendra Horn, serving as her community outreach specialist until she left office in 2019. He was an attorney at Foshee & Yaffe until leaving the firm in 2021.

Cruz has served on the board of directors for Variety Care since 2014.

=== Oklahoma House of Representatives ===
Cruz was elected to the Oklahoma House of Representatives in November 2020 after incumbent Shane Stone resigned to take a job in Arizona. He was sworn into office on November 11, 2020. Cruz was the first Latino to represent Oklahoma House District 89.

While in the Oklahoma House, Cruz served on the House Criminal Judiciary Committee and the House Agriculture and Rural Development Committee. He also served as a member of the Appropriations and Budget Subcommittee on Judiciary and Public Safety and was a founding member the bipartisan, bicameral Oklahoma Legislative Latino Caucus in 2021.

==== Resignation ====
He resigned on January 21, 2022 after "acting inappropriately" at a New Year's Eve Party. After Cruz's resignation, a lobbyist came forward alleging he assaulted her in her apartment at a New Year's Eve party and filed a police reporting alleging similar incidents with two other women. House Minority Leader Emily Virgin and Caucus Chair Cyndi Munson both advised Cruz to resign on January 16, 2022 after learning of the allegations.
