= Oklahoma Intercollegiate Legislature =

Political education organization

- Founder: George Nigh
- Established: 1969
- Governor: Tallie Tynes
- Slogan: Labor Omnia Vincit
- Location: Oklahoma City, Oklahoma
- Website: www.okoil.org

The Oklahoma Intercollegiate Legislature (O.I.L.) is a collegiate political education organization located in Oklahoma City, Oklahoma. Founded in 1969, the organization conducts mock legislative sessions biannually.

== History ==
The founding of the Oklahoma Intercollegiate legislature is attributed to a group of Oklahoma college students and then Lt Governor George Nigh in 1969. Oklahoma Intercollegiate Legislature's first inaugural session was held in the spring of 1969. Nigh is accredited to being the founder of the Oklahoma intercollegiate legislature.

In 2008, Oklahoma House Concurrent Resolution 1072 was passed in both the Oklahoma House of Representatives and the Oklahoma Senate. HCR 1072 officially commended the Oklahoma Intercollegiate Legislature for its contributions to the State of Oklahoma.

== Structure and activities ==
Students in the Oklahoma Intercollegiate Legislature conduct a biannual legislative session at the Oklahoma State Capitol. The full bicameral legislature is simulated, with the legislative process being core to the simulation. Each session lasts for 3-5 days with participants drafting their own legislation to be debated and voted upon. Some of the proposed mock legislation is sent to state legislators and officials for consideration to become actual legislation. Since the organization's inception in 1969, the organization has added a Press Corp competition, Moot Court competition and Lobbying competition.

The organization is split into three branches. The legislature, which is composed of mock versions of the Oklahoma House of Representatives and Oklahoma Senate. The Executive branch leads the statewide organization. The Judicial branch oversees the Moot Competition.

The Governor serves as the chief executive officer of the organization. The membership body elects the governor during the spring session for a 1 year term. The Governor has the power to veto any legislation passed by both chambers of legislature. In 1991, the Oklahoma Intercollegiate Legislature elected the first female governor in the organization's history.

== Notable members ==
Many of the organization's former members have later served in elected office, became practicing attorneys or worked in government executive positions at the state and federal level.

- George Nigh (17th and 22nd Governor of Oklahoma)
- Mike Synar (U.S. Representative for Oklahoma's 2nd congressional district)
- Kendra Horn (U.S Representative for Oklahoma's 5th congressional district)
- Stratton Taylor (President pro tempore of the Oklahoma Senate)
- Kimberly Teehee (Delegate-designate to the U.S. House of Representatives from the Cherokee Nation.)
- Danny Morgan (politician) (Member of the Oklahoma House of Representatives, former House Minority Leader)
- Shane Stone (Oklahoma politician) (Member of the Oklahoma House of Representatives for the 89th District)
- Joe Dorman (Member of the Oklahoma House of Representatives for the 65th District)
- Cleta Mitchell (Member of the Oklahoma House of Representatives for the 44th District)
- Forrest Bennett (Member of the Oklahoma House of Representatives for the 92nd District) (CEO for the Oklahoma AFL-CIO)
- Trey Caldwell (politician) (Member of the Oklahoma House of Representatives for the 63rd District)
- Eric Proctor (Member of the Oklahoma House of Representatives for the 77th District)
- Audra Smoke-Conner (Tribal Councilor for the Cherokee Nation 1st District)

== Notable events ==
On a Thursday in February 1983, Oklahoma Intercollegiate Legislature delegates lobbied against a bill that would raise the legal age to drink beer with 3.2% alcohol content to 21.
