= Forrest Bennett =

American politician

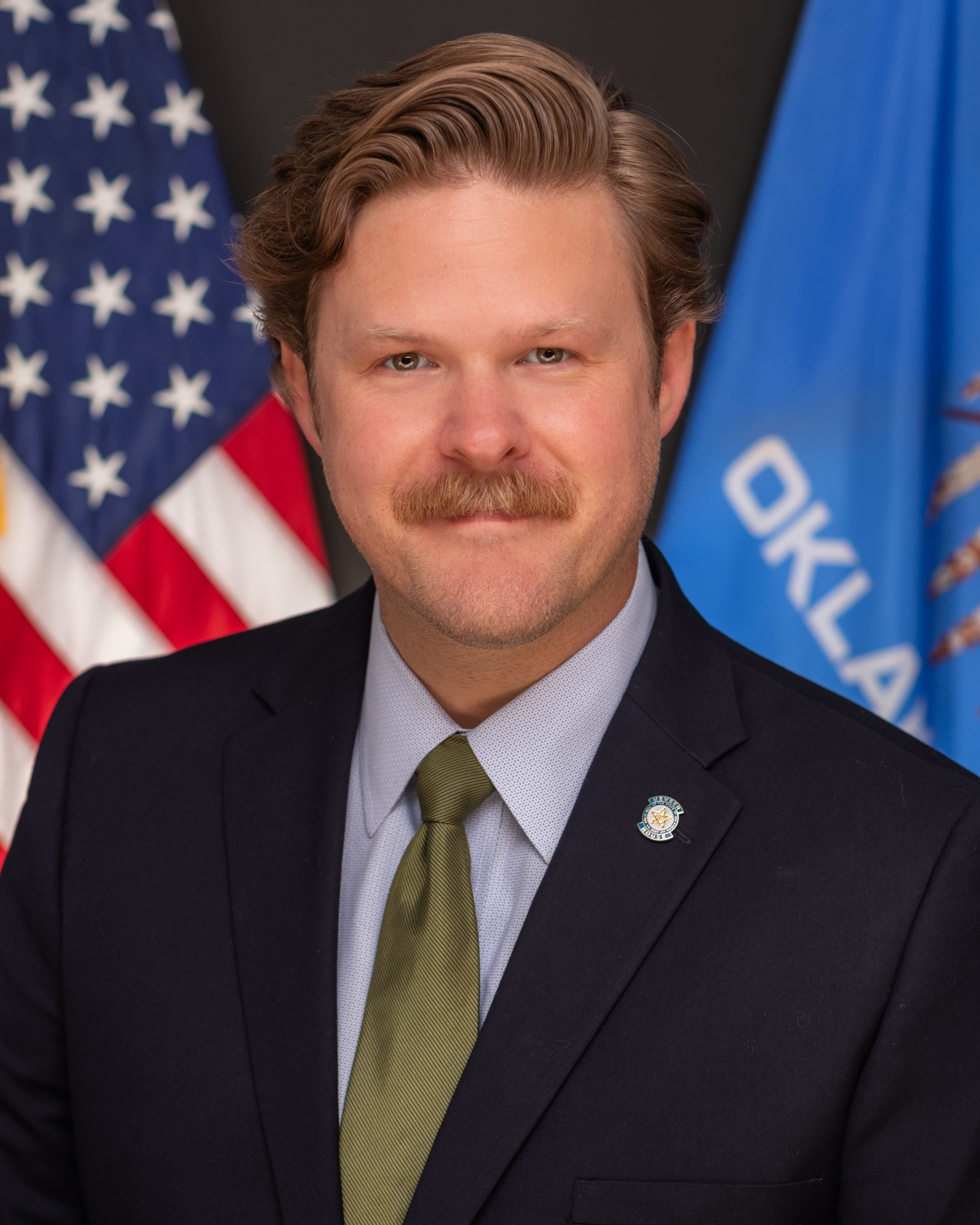

President of the Oklahoma AFL-CIO
- Incumbent
- Assumed office November 7, 2025
- Preceded by: Jimmy Curry

Member of the Oklahoma House of Representatives from the 92nd district
- In office November 17, 2016 – December 1, 2025
- Preceded by: Richard Morrissette
- Succeeded by: Sam Wargin Grimaldo

Personal details
- Born: Forrest Welch Bennett; August 13, 1989 (age 36) Bartlesville, Oklahoma, U.S.
- Party: Democratic
- Education: University of Oklahoma (BA, MPA)

Forrest Welch Bennett (born August 13, 1989) is an American politician and trade unionist who has served as president of the Oklahoma AFL-CIO since 2025. A member of the Democratic Party, he previously served as a member of the Oklahoma House of Representatives from the 92nd district from 2016 to 2025.

== Early life ==
Bennett was born on August 13, 1989, in Bartlesville, Oklahoma, to Kevin and Cindy Bennett. He graduated from Bartlesville High School in 2008 and enrolled at the University of Oklahoma (OU). While at OU, Bennett was involved with student government, including the Oklahoma Intercollegiate Legislature, and ran for student body president in 2011. He graduated from OU with a bachelor's degree in political science in 2012 and a Master of Public Administration in 2016. Following graduation, Bennett worked for a political consulting firm and the public education advocacy group Stand For Children.

== Political career ==
In 2016, Bennett was one of three Democratic candidates who filed in Oklahoma House District 92 to replace Richard Morrissette, who could not run for re-election due to term limits. During the campaign, Bennett made headlines for having his vehicle stolen while campaigning. After securing his party's nomination, Bennett defeated Republican challenger Joe Griffin to win his seat.

Bennett ran unopposed for re-election in 2018. He was elected president of the Oklahoma AFL-CIO on November 7, 2025, and announced he would resign his legislative seat effective December 1.

== Personal life ==
Bennett has two brothers, of which he is the middle child. Bennett is married to Oklahoma City Public Schools board member Meg McElhaney.

== Election results ==
2016 Oklahoma House District 92 Primary Election June 28, 2016
Party	Candidate	Votes	%
Democratic	Forrest Bennett	395	54.33
Democratic	Jess Eddy	240	33.01
Democratic	Wilfredo Santos Rivera	92	12.65

2016 Oklahoma House District 92 General Election November 8, 2016
Party	Candidate	Votes	%
Democratic	Forrest Bennett	3,263	60.54
Republican	Joe Griffin	2,127	39.46

Forrest Bennett ran unopposed for re-election in 2018

Forrest Bennett ran unopposed for re-election in 2020

Forrest Bennett ran unopposed for re-election in 2022

Forrest Bennett ran unopposed for re-election in 2024
