= Shane Stone (Oklahoma politician) =

American politician

Member of the Oklahoma House of Representatives from the 89th district
- In office November 18, 2014 – December 31, 2019
- Preceded by: Rebecca Hamilton
- Succeeded by: Jose Cruz

Personal details
- Born: October 26, 1992 (age 33)
- Party: Democratic
- Education: Oklahoma City Community College (A.A.)

Shane Stone (born October 26, 1992) is an American politician and civil servant who served in the Oklahoma House of Representatives for the 89th district from 2014 to 2019. He later worked in municipal government in Maricopa, Arizona, and, as of December 2024, serves as the director of governmental affairs for Tulsa, Oklahoma.

== Biography ==
Stone graduated from Oklahoma City Community College with a associate's degree in Political science. During his time in education, he was a member in the Oklahoma Intercollegiate Legislature. He was elected to the Oklahoma House of Representatives to represent the 89th district in 2014 and served through 2019. He resigned on December 31, 2019. The district was in Oklahoma City. From 2021 to 2024, Stone lived in Arizona working he municipal government. He was the city manager and police executive administrator for Maricopa. In December 2024, he joined the administration of Tulsa Mayor Monroe Nichols as the director of governmental affairs.
