= Enhanced use lease =

In the United States, the enhanced use lease (EUL) is a method for funding construction or renovations on federal property by allowing a private developer to lease underutilized property, with rent paid by the developer in the form of cash or in-kind services. Currently, EULs are used by the Department of Defense and the Veterans Administration. Temporary authority has also been granted to the General Services Administration and NASA. EUL authority is derived from Congress and is specific to each agency (e.g. 10 USC 2667 for the DoD). The information below is specific to DoD EULs.

Granted a ground lease (the term may vary by agency or project), the developer is able to make improvements to the property which can be leased at market rents to any interested tenants. Under EUL, the U.S. government retains control over the leased property, the EUL developer (lessee) retains a lease interest only.

Since the agency can issue enhanced use leases only on land that is unneeded, the improvements must not be directly tied to any programmatic requirements of the installation.

The advantages to the developer include prime secure convenient locations on military installations, and the opportunity to provide sole-source services and products in lieu of rent for the ground lease.

The advantages to the federal agency include the possibility of fast-tracking alterations, repairs or new construction so that the improved space becomes available for lease. In-kind considerations or cash to no less than the fair market value of the property is provided in return by the developer.

The enhanced use lease is becoming a very popular tool to accommodate realignment of military functions under Base Realignment and Closure (BRAC). Military installations are legally bound, but not necessarily funded, to accommodate BRAC-mandated realignments of functions.

The use of EULs has mushroomed with the expanded authority of Title 10 USC, Section 2667, of the National Defense Authorization Act. It remains to be seen whether this form of privatization will create increased financial, security or environmental risks. Legal complications that have emerged include how EUL-encumbered property will be treated when an installation is targeted for closure under BRAC (example, Building 40 at Walter Reed Army Medical Center).

== See also ==
- Military housing privatization
