= Richard Morrissette =

American politician (1956–2025)

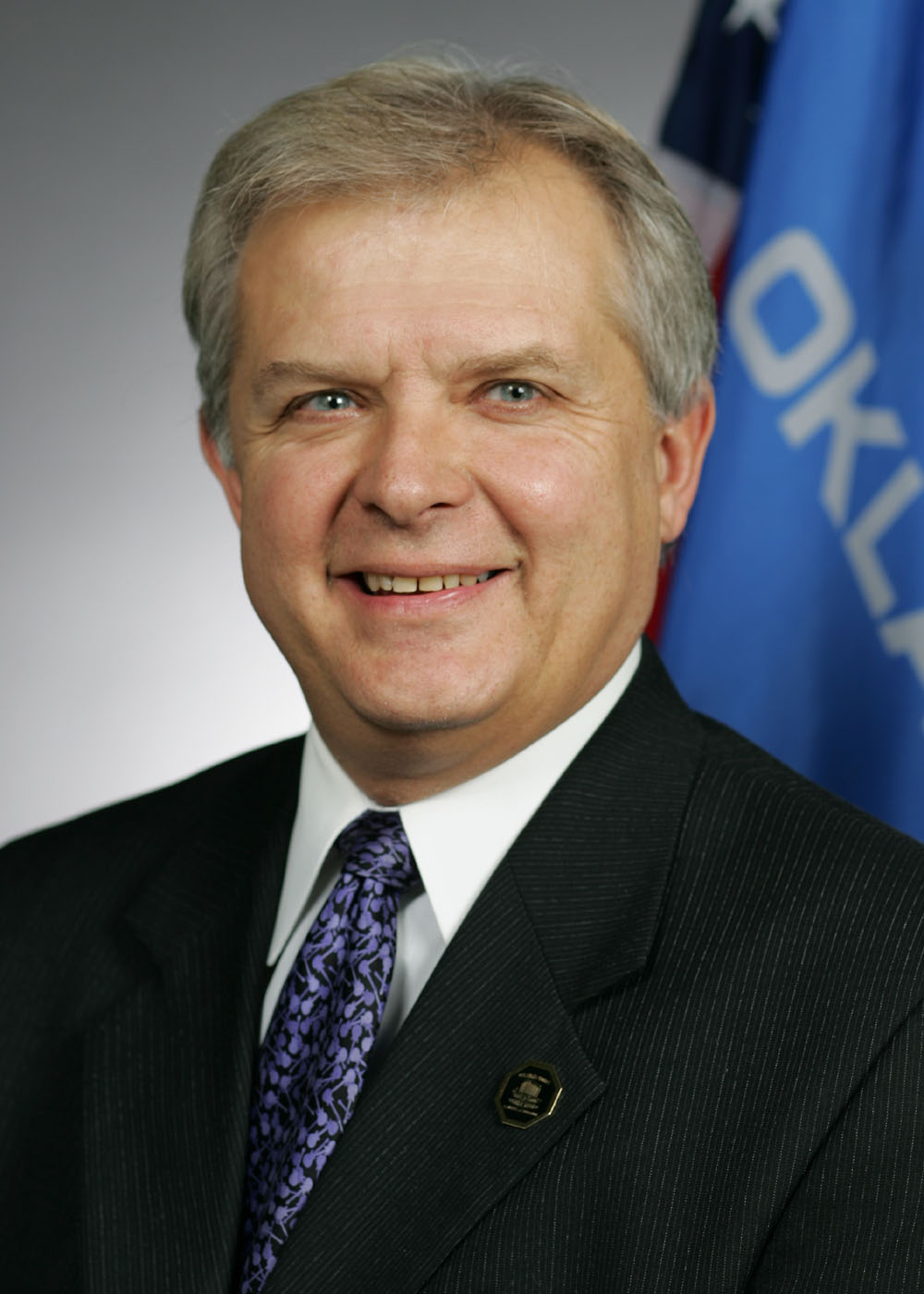
- Morrissette's official Oklahoma House of Representatives portrait

Member of the Oklahoma House of Representatives from the 92nd district
- In office November 16, 2004 – November 17, 2016
- Preceded by: Bill Paulk
- Succeeded by: Forrest Bennett

Member of the New Hampshire House of Representatives from the Strafford 7 district
- In office 1975–1981
- Preceded by: Eugene J. Habel
- Succeeded by: Mary E. Bernard

Personal details
- Born: April 28, 1956 Rochester, New Hampshire, U.S.
- Died: September 21, 2025 (aged 69) Somersworth, New Hampshire, U.S.
- Party: Democratic

Richard D. Morrissette (April 28, 1956 – September 21, 2025) was an American politician who served in the Oklahoma House of Representatives from the 92nd district from 2004 to 2016. A native of New Hampshire, he previously served in the New Hampshire House of Representatives in Strafford's 7th district from 1975 to 1981.

== Biography ==
Morrissette was born in Rochester, New Hampshire, on April 28, 1956. He graduated from the University of New Hampshire in 1979 and the University of Tulsa College of Law in 1984.

He served in the New Hampshire House of Representatives representing Strafford County's 7th district from 1976 to 1981. He was initially elected while attending college.

After moving to Oklahoma and graduating law school, he worked for the Oklahoma Senate from 1985 to 1986 before working for the Legal Aid of Western Oklahoma Public Defender's Office from 1986 until 1992. He later served in the Oklahoma House of Representatives from the 92nd district from 2004 to 2016.

In 2010 he passed legislation to monitor redcedar trees.

In 2016, he campaigned for the Oklahoma Corporation Commission and won the Democratic nomination, but he withdrew from the race after the death of his father. He ran for the Oklahoma City City Council's Ward 4 seat in 2017 and advanced to the runoff, but lost to Todd Stone.

Morrissette died from liver and bile duct cancer on September 21, 2025, at the age of 69.
