= Arturo Alonso =

American politician

Arturo Alonso-Sandoval
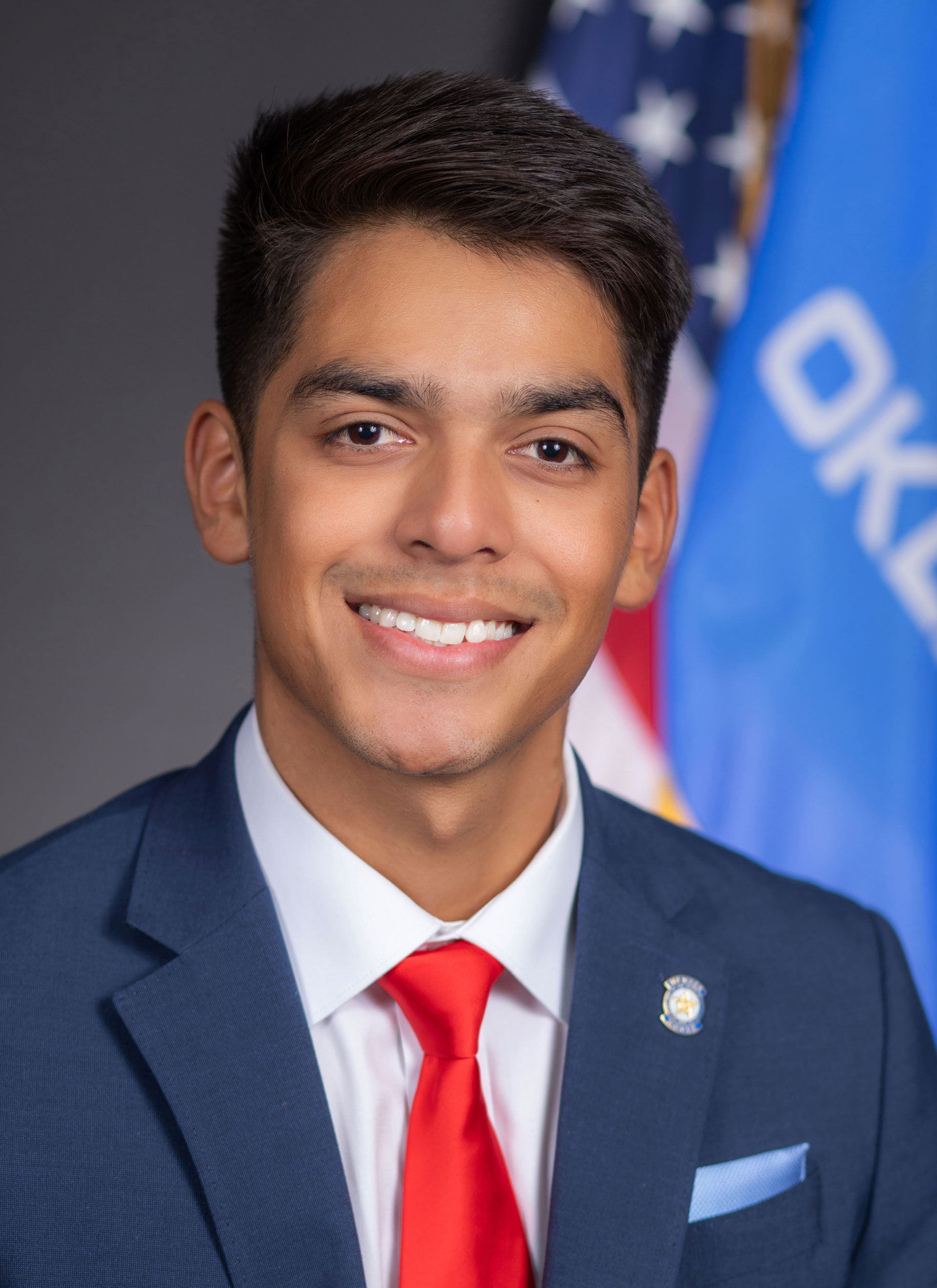

Minority Caucus Secretary of the Oklahoma House of Representatives
- Incumbent
- Assumed office January 7, 2025
- Preceded by: John Waldron

Member of the Oklahoma House of Representatives from the 89th district
- Incumbent
- Assumed office November 22, 2022
- Preceded by: Jose Cruz

Personal details
- Born: January 7, 1999 (age 27) United States
- Party: Democratic
- Education: University of Oklahoma (BS)

Arturo Alonso-Sandoval (born January 7, 1999) is an American politician serving as a member of the Oklahoma House of Representatives from the 89th district since 2022. A member of the Democratic Party, he has served as House Democratic Caucus Secretary since January 2025. He has authored legislation on artificial intelligence regulation, including measures on election deepfakes and state agency AI inventories.

== Early life and education ==
Alonso-Sandoval was born in the United States and spent his early childhood in Guanajuato, Mexico. When he was four years old, his family settled in Oklahoma City, where he completed middle and high school at Santa Fe South Public Charter Schools. While in high school, he volunteered on Michael Brooks-Jimenez's state senate campaign, and he has said that translating for his Spanish-speaking parents while growing up shaped his interest in representation. He earned a Bachelor of Science in mechanical engineering from the University of Oklahoma, graduating in May 2022, and speaks both English and Spanish.

== Oklahoma House of Representatives ==
=== Elections ===
Alonso-Sandoval ran for the 89th district of the Oklahoma House of Representatives in 2022. The seat was vacant after the resignation of Jose Cruz. He faced Cristian Zapata and Chris Bryant in the Democratic primary. Alonso-Sandoval won the June 28 Democratic primary with 63.3 percent of the vote and, since no candidate from another party filed in the district, he won the seat outright. He was sworn in at the Oklahoma State Capitol on November 22, 2022, and assumed office the following day.

Alonso-Sandoval won reelection outright in both 2024 and 2026 after no other candidates filed for the seat, and the primary and general elections were canceled in both cycles.

=== Tenure ===
In January 2025, House Democratic Leader Cyndi Munson named Alonso-Sandoval House Democratic Caucus Secretary for the 60th Oklahoma Legislature, succeeding John Waldron. The leadership assignments were announced on Organizational Day, when the legislature convened on January 7, 2025. He is a member of the Oklahoma Legislative Latino Caucus. For the 60th Legislature, he serves on the Commerce and Economic Development Oversight, Energy and Natural Resources Oversight, Government Modernization and Technology, and Utilities committees, as well as the Appropriations and Budget Natural Resources subcommittee.

==== Artificial intelligence ====
In October 2023, Alonso-Sandoval co-led a bipartisan interim study on artificial intelligence alongside Representative Daniel Pae before the House Government Modernization and Technology Committee. The study examined how AI could affect the state's economy, labor market, and workforce training, along with the ethics and legal questions raised by the technology's adoption, such as privacy, algorithmic bias, and transparency.

Following the study, Alonso-Sandoval authored two AI measures in the 2024 legislative session. House Bill 3825 would bar the spread of deceptive deepfake content in the 90 days before an election unless it carries a clear disclosure, with carve-outs for journalism and satire. House Bill 3828 would direct the Office of Management and Enterprise Services and the state court administration to catalog government systems that use AI each year and evaluate them for discriminatory outcomes. Both bills passed the House Government Modernization and Technology Committee unanimously in February 2024.

In 2025, he introduced House Bill 1916, the Responsible Deployment of AI Systems Act, a regulatory framework that would classify AI systems into four risk categories and establish a state Artificial Intelligence Council, an AI regulatory sandbox program, and an AI workforce development program. The bill was referred to the House Rules Committee and died in committee.

In the 2026 legislative session, Alonso-Sandoval authored House Bill 4083, a measure concerning minors' access to AI chatbots and age verification requirements.

==== Immigration ====
Alonso-Sandoval has spoken against several Republican-led immigration measures in the House. During the 2024 floor debate on House Bill 4156, which created the state crime of "impermissible occupation" for entering Oklahoma while unlawfully present in the country, he described the bill as political and argued it would create distrust of police among immigrant communities.

In 2025, he opposed House Bill 1362, a measure establishing a felony charge for undocumented immigrants arrested for state criminal violations, calling it "un-Oklahoman and un-American". He argued the measure was unnecessary given existing state and federal law and noted that undocumented immigrants pay an estimated $227 million in annual state taxes in Oklahoma. In 2026, he spoke against House Bills 4422 and 4423, legislation authored by House Speaker Kyle Hilbert that would require state agencies to report public benefits applicants without legal immigration status to the state attorney general's office, arguing the measures targeted low-income families and children rather than criminals.

== Personal life ==
Alonso-Sandoval is a first-generation American. His parents are immigrants who were born in Guanajuato, Mexico.
