= Kendra Horn =

American politician and lawyer (born 1976)

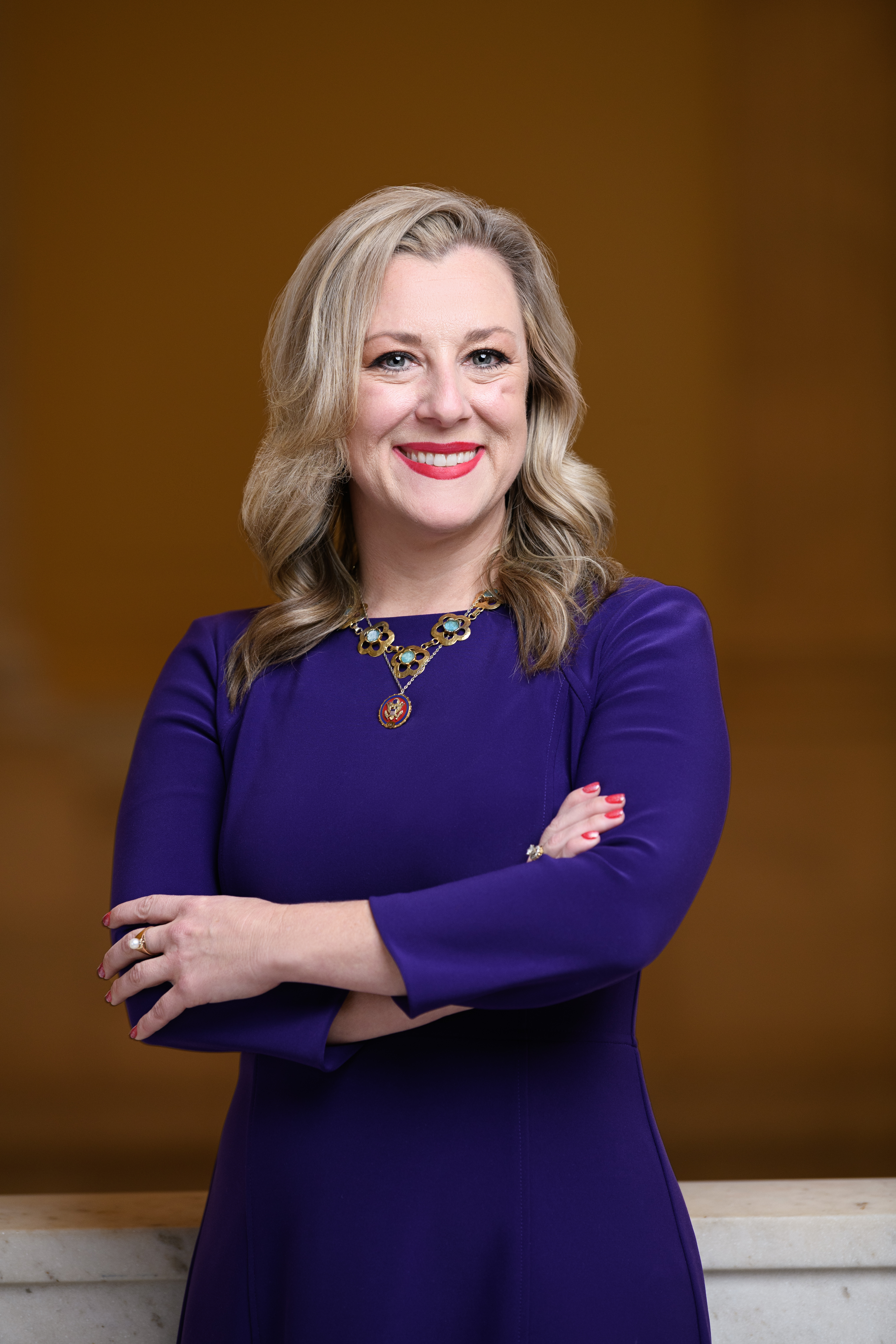
- Official portrait, c. 2019–2020

Member of the U.S. House of Representatives from Oklahoma's 5th district
- In office January 3, 2019 – January 3, 2021
- Preceded by: Steve Russell
- Succeeded by: Stephanie Bice

Personal details
- Born: Kendra Suzanne Horn; June 9, 1976 (age 50) Chickasha, Oklahoma, U.S.
- Party: Democratic
- Education: University of Tulsa (BA); Southern Methodist University (JD)
- Horn's voice Horn on living conditions within privatized military housing. Recorded December 5, 2019

Kendra Suzanne Horn (born June 9, 1976) is an American politician and lawyer who served as the U.S. representative for Oklahoma's 5th congressional district from 2019 to 2021. A member of the Democratic Party, her district included the vast majority of Oklahoma City. Horn is to date the most recent Democrat to represent Oklahoma in Congress.

Horn narrowly defeated Republican incumbent Steve Russell in the 2018 election in what many political analysts considered an upset victory. She was the first Democrat to represent the state's 5th congressional district in 44 years and the first Oklahoma Democrat elected to Congress in eight years. She was the first Democratic woman elected to the House from the state of Oklahoma. Horn lost her 2020 re-election bid to Republican challenger Stephanie Bice after serving one term.

Horn was the Democratic nominee in the Oklahoma Senate special election in 2022, losing to Markwayne Mullin.

== Early life and education ==
Born in Chickasha, Oklahoma, Horn was a member of the Girl Scouts and received the Gold Award. Horn received her bachelor's degree in political science with Omicron Delta Kappa honors from the University of Tulsa in 1998. During her time at University, she was a member of the Oklahoma Intercollegiate Legislature. In 2001, Horn received her J.D. degree from Southern Methodist University Dedman School of Law. She also studied at the International Space University in Strasbourg, France.

== Early career ==
Kendra Horn worked in private practice as a lawyer at a small firm in Dallas, Texas before opening a solo practice in 2002. Horn served as the press secretary to United States Congressman Brad Carson (OK-02) from 2004 to 2005. She went on to work for the Space Foundation first as Manager of Government Affairs at their D.C. office and later as the Manager of Communication and Media Relations until 2008. She also worked as a strategic consultant with Amatra, a communication technology firm, beginning in 2009. During the 2014 Oklahoma gubernatorial election, Horn managed the political campaign of Democratic nominee Joe Dorman. In addition, Horn co-founded and served as executive director of Sally's List, an Oklahoma-based organization that recruits and supports women candidates, and Women Lead Oklahoma, a nonpartisan nonprofit that trains and supports women to encourage community and civic action.

== U.S. House of Representatives ==
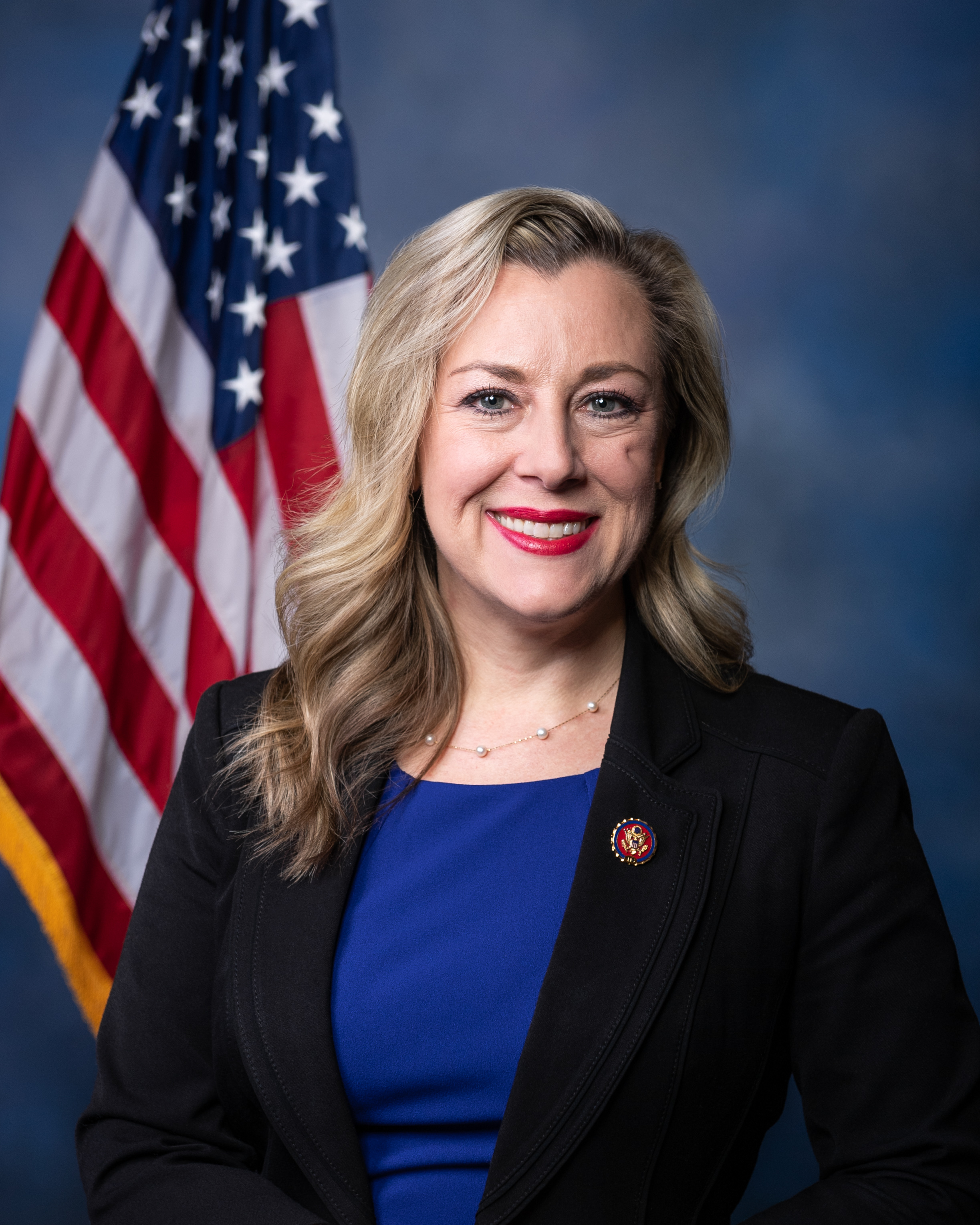
Freshman portrait of Kendra Horn, January 2019

=== Elections ===
==== 2018 ====
On July 3, 2017, Horn announced her candidacy for the Democratic nomination for United States House of Representatives to Oklahoma's fifth congressional district. After receiving 44% of the vote in the Democratic primary on June 26, 2018, Horn and primary opponent Tom Guild advanced to the primary runoff. During the August 28 primary, Horn received 76% of the vote, easily defeating Tom Guild and becoming the Democratic nominee.

Horn defeated Republican Steve Russell in the November 6 general election with 50.7% to his 49.3% of the vote, in what was widely considered one of the most stunning upsets of the cycle. Nearly every major rating organization believed Russell would win, and FiveThirtyEight only gave Horn a 14% chance of winning. Ultimately, Horn won by defeating Russell in Oklahoma County, home to three-fourths of the district's population, by 9,900 votes, more than three times the overall margin of 3,300 votes. She garnered support from female Republican voters in an election largely seen as a referendum against President Donald Trump.

When Horn took office, she became the first Democrat to represent the district since John Jarman in 1974, who switched parties to become a Republican midway through what would be his final term.

==== 2020 ====
Horn won the Democratic nomination for her seat in the 2020 primary. She faced Republican state Senator Stephanie Bice in the 2020 general election. Bice defeated Horn in the 2020 election, returning the seat to Republican control.

After the 2020 election, Horn joined former Congress members Xochitl Torres Small and Joe Cunningham to launch Shield PAC, a political action committee that hopes to raise funds to defend moderate Democrats in swing districts.

=== Tenure ===
On January 3, 2019, the first day of the 116th United States Congress, Congresswoman Horn joined 219 other Democrats to support Nancy Pelosi in the chamber-wide election for Speaker of the United States House of Representatives. When explaining her decision to support Pelosi, Horn mentioned that the Democratic and Republican nominees were Pelosi and Kevin McCarthy, respectively, and said that Pelosi's support for improving health care, strengthening Medicare and Social Security, and supporting public education aligned with her successful campaign platform in the 2018 election and therefore with her goals in Congress. The admission of Horn to the New Democrat Coalition was announced on January 23. On January 29, Horn announced she was joining the Blue Dog Coalition, a group of moderate and conservative Democrats. Horn is considered to be a moderate Democrat.

On December 18, 2019, Horn voted for both articles of impeachment against President Trump.

=== Committee assignments ===
- Committee on Armed Services
  - Subcommittee on Readiness
  - Subcommittee on Strategic Forces
- Committee on Science, Space, and Technology
  - Subcommittee on Energy
  - Subcommittee on Space and Aeronautics (chair)

=== Caucus memberships ===
- Blue Dog Coalition
- New Democrat Coalition
- Problem Solvers Caucus

== 2022 U.S. Senate campaign ==
In March 2022, Horn announced that she would be running in the 2022 United States Senate special election in Oklahoma after Jim Inhofe announced his retirement. Horn ran unopposed for the Democratic nomination. She lost the general election to Republican candidate Markwayne Mullin by a wide margin.

== Personal life ==
Horn was born and raised in Chickasha, Oklahoma. She is an Episcopalian.

She is not biologically related to Madison Horn, the Democratic nominee for the other Senate election held in parallel in Oklahoma.

== Electoral history ==
Democratic primary results, 2018
Party	Candidate	Votes	%
Democratic	Kendra Horn	34,857	43.8
Democratic	Tom Guild	14,242	17.9
Democratic	Elysabeth Britt	10,739	13.5
Democratic	Eddie Porter	8,447	10.6
Democratic	Leona Kelley-Leonard	6,693	8.4
Democratic	Tyson Todd Meade	4,527	5.7
Total votes		79,505	100.0

Democratic primary runoff results, 2018
Party	Candidate	Votes	%
Democratic	Kendra Horn	22,052	75.8
Democratic	Tom Guild	7,039	24.2
Total votes		29,091	100.0

Oklahoma's 5th congressional district, 2018
Party	Candidate	Votes	%
Democratic	Kendra Horn	121,149	50.7
Republican	Steve Russell (incumbent)	117,811	49.3
Total votes		238,960	100.0
Democratic gain from Republican			

Democratic primary results, 2020
Party	Candidate	Votes	%
Democratic	Kendra Horn (incumbent)	60,168	85.69
Democratic	Tom Guild	10,050	14.31
Total votes		70,218	100.0

Oklahoma's 5th congressional district, 2020
Party	Candidate	Votes	%
Republican	Stephanie Bice	158,044	52.1
Democratic	Kendra Horn (incumbent)	145,541	47.9
Total votes		303,585	100.0
Republican gain from Democratic			

2022 United States Senate special election in Oklahoma
Party	Candidate	Votes	%
Republican	Markwayne Mullin	710,643	61.8
Democratic	Kendra Horn	405,389	35.2
Libertarian	Robert Murphy	17,386	1.5
Independent	Ray Woods	17,063	1.5
Total votes		1,150,481	100.0
Republican hold			

== See also ==
- Women in the United States House of Representatives

U.S. House of Representatives
Preceded by Steve Russell	Member of the U.S. House of Representatives from Oklahoma's 5th congressional district 2019–2021	Succeeded by Stephanie Bice
Party political offices
Preceded by Abby Broyles	Democratic nominee for U.S. Senator from Oklahoma (Class 2); 2022	Succeeded by N'Kiyla Jasmine Thomas
U.S. order of precedence (ceremonial)
Preceded by Ben McAdams as Former U.S. Representative	Order of precedence of the United States as Former U.S. Representative	Succeeded by Harry Teague as Former U.S. Representative
