= Rebecca Hamilton (politician) =

American politician (born 1948)

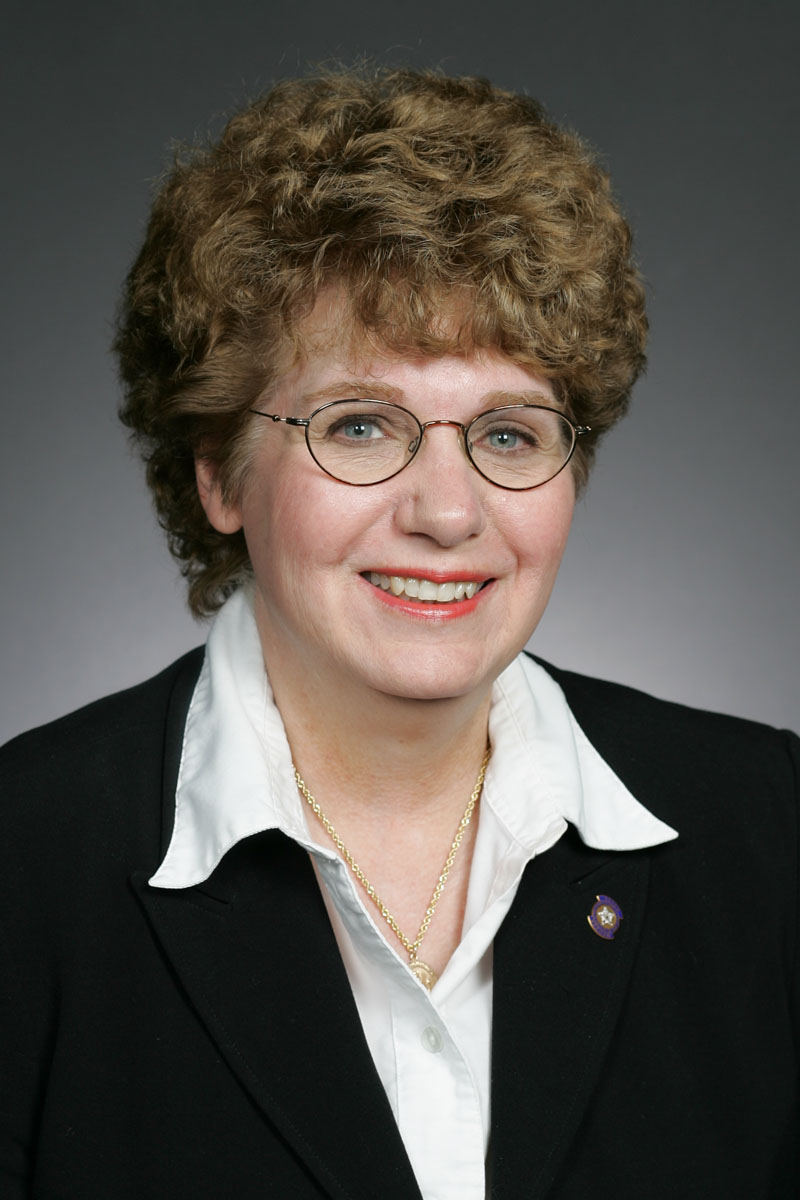

Member of the Oklahoma House of Representatives from the 89th district
- In office 1981–1986
- Preceded by: L. H. Bengston, Jr.
- Succeeded by: Kevin Hutchcroft
- In office 2003–2015
- Preceded by: Charles Ellis Gray
- Succeeded by: Shane Stone

Personal details
- Born: January 8, 1948 (age 78) Oklahoma City, Oklahoma, U.S.
- Party: Democratic
- Spouse: Rodney Hargrave
- Profession: Writer

Rebecca Hamilton (born January 8, 1948) is a former politician in the U.S. state of Oklahoma. Hamilton served in the Oklahoma House of Representatives from 1981 to 1986 and again in 2003 until 2015. Both times Hamilton represented district 89.

== Early life ==
Rebecca Hamilton was born in her district in Oklahoma City, Oklahoma. Hamilton grew up in south Oklahoma City with one younger sister. Her father worked at the stockyards and her mother also worked in the stockyards as a weighmaster. Hamilton graduated from Capitol Hill High School. In high school, one of Hamilton's teachers ran for office and Hamilton helped him campaign with her classmates. This initial exposure to politics took place when Hamilton was only fifteen years old.

== Political career ==
In the 1970s, Hamilton became interested with the women's rights movement and was very involved with the Women's Political Caucus. She was the state treasurer and on the finance committee of the National Women's Political Caucus. Around the time that Oklahoma was trying to ratify the Equal Rights Amendment, Hamilton ran for the Oklahoma House of Representatives and lost by 21 votes.

== House of Representatives ==
1981-1986

In 1980, Hamilton ran against an incumbent member and won. Hamilton sponsored several controversial bills during her first six years in office. Her first bill that was made into law made rape by instrumentation against the law, as well as established the illegality of spousal rape. Hamilton was the original author of the Protective Order in Oklahoma. Hamilton married fellow Oklahoma representative Rodney Hargrave in 1983. In 1986, Hamilton had a baby and decided to stay home with her children rather than running for office again.

Committees:

- Chair of Health Committee

2003-2015

When Hamilton came back to the House of Representatives, she had changed from pro-choice to anti-abortion. As a result, Hamilton was the primary author of House Bill 1686 in 2005. This bill required informed consent prior to an abortion and mandated parental notification before an abortion could be performed on a minor.

Committees:

- Chair of Commerce, Industry, and Labor Committee
- County and Municipal Government Committee
- Public Health Committee
- Health Committee

Hamilton served as the Assistant Democratic Floor Leader.

== Personal life ==
Hamilton is married to Rodney Hargrave and has two children, John and Hamilton. She is a Catholic, having converted during her shift to an anti-abortion stance.
