= Military housing privatization =

American government initiative to privatize military housing

The military housing privatization initiative (MHPI) was established by the United States Congress in 1996 as a tool to help the military improve the quality of life for its service members by improving the condition of their housing. The MHPI was designed and developed to attract private-sector financing, expertise and innovation to provide necessary housing faster and more efficiently than traditional military construction processes would allow. The Office of the U.S. Secretary of Defense has delegated to the military services the MHPI and they are authorized to enter into agreements with private developers selected in a competitive process to own, maintain and operate family housing via a fifty-year lease.

MHPI addresses two significant problems concerning housing for military-service members and their families: (1) the poor condition of housing owned by the U.S. Department of Defense (DOD), and (2) a shortage of quality affordable private housing. Under the MHPI authorities, DOD works with the private sector to revitalize military family housing through a variety of financial tools-direct loans, loan guarantees, equity investments, conveyance or leasing of land and/or housing/and other facilities. Military service members receive a basic allowance where they can choose to live in private sector housing, or privatized housing.

== Programs by military service ==
Military service	Program name
United States Army	Residential Communities Initiative
United States Air Force	USAF Housing Privatization
United States Navy and United States Marine Corps	Public Private Venture

== See also ==
- 104th United States Congress
- Enhanced use lease
