= Earl Garrison =

American politician

Member of the Oklahoma Senate from the 9th district
- In office November 17, 2004 – November 22, 2016
- Preceded by: Ben Robinson
- Succeeded by: Dewayne Pemberton

Personal details
- Born: April 24, 1941 (age 85) Muskogee, Oklahoma, U.S.
- Party: Democratic
- Spouse: Faye Garrison
- Education: University of Tulsa, University of Oklahoma
- Occupation: Rancher, educator

Earl Garrison was an Oklahoma Senator from District 9 between 2004 and 2016, which included Muskogee and Wagoner counties. He succeeded long-time State Senator Ben Robinson of Muskogee after Senator Robinson was prevented from seeking reelection due to term limits.

== Career ==
Garrison served in the Oklahoma Senate from 2004 to 2016. He was Minority Whip from 2011 to 2014. He also served as Assistant Minority Leader. He also worked as an educator and rancher. He served in the United States Air Force.

== Family ==
=== Jessica Jean Garrison ===
In November 2021, Earl Garrison's daughter Jessica Jean Garrison announced a campaign for Oklahoma's United States Senate seat held by James Lankford. However, she later filed for the open United States Senate seat created by the retirement of Jim Inhofe.
