= 2020 United States Senate election in Oklahoma =

- November 3, 2020
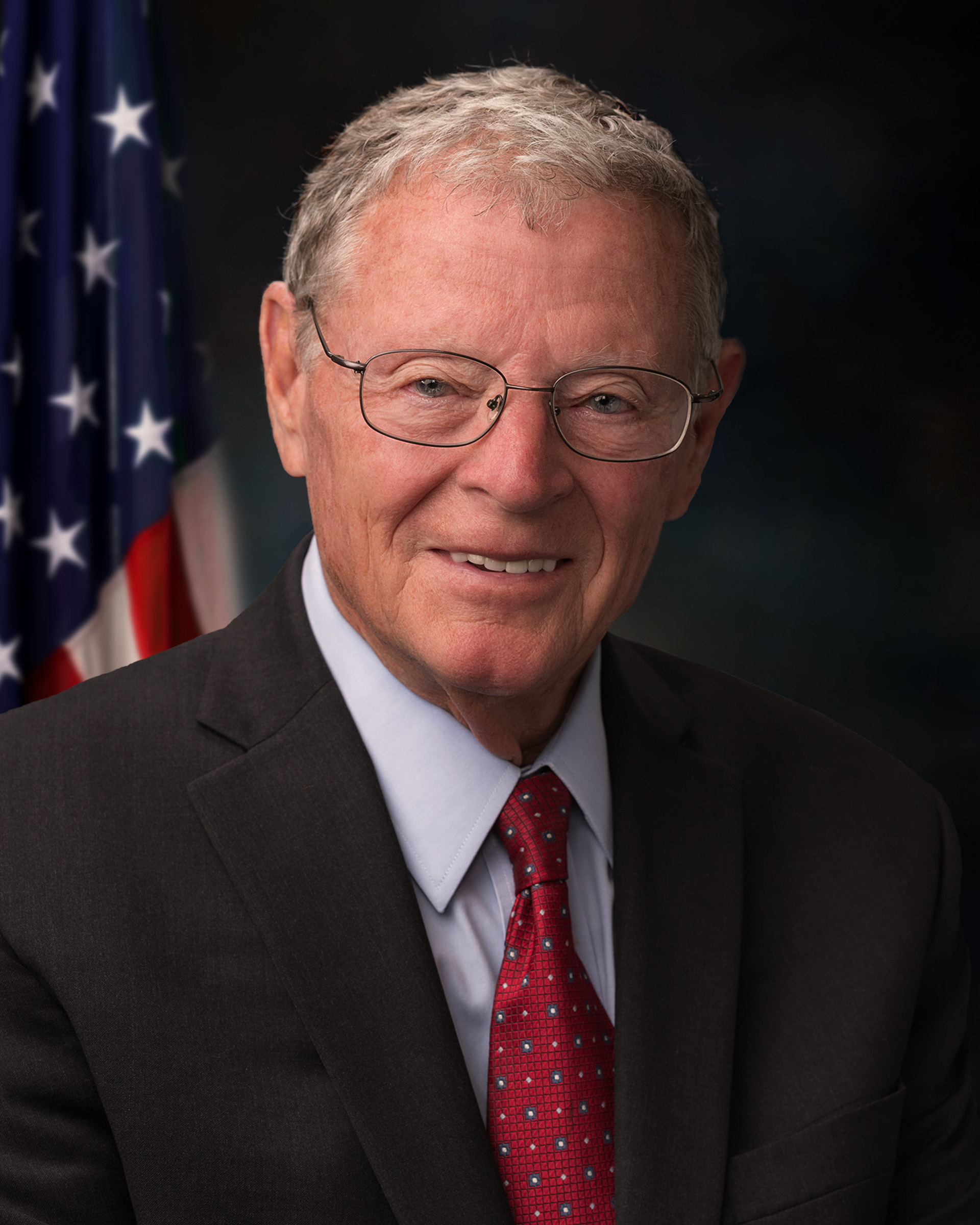

Nominee	Jim Inhofe	Abby Broyles
Party	Republican	Democratic
Popular vote	979,140	509,763
Percentage	62.91%	32.75%
- Inhofe: 40–50% 50–60% 60–70% 70–80% 80–90% >90%
U.S. senator before election
Jim Inhofe
Republican
Elected U.S. Senator
Jim Inhofe
Republican

The 2020 United States Senate election in Oklahoma was held on November 3, 2020, to elect a member of the United States Senate to represent the State of Oklahoma, concurrently with the 2020 U.S. presidential election, as well as other elections to the United States Senate in other states and elections to the United States House of Representatives, and various state and local elections. Incumbent Republican Senator Jim Inhofe won reelection to a fifth full term, defeating Democratic challenger Abby Broyles.

This proved to be the fifth U.S. Senate election in Oklahoma in a row in which the Democratic nominee failed to carry any of Oklahoma's counties, but Broyles came very close to breaking this drought, losing Oklahoma County by less than one percentage point. To date, this election has seen the largest age-gap between major party nominees in a U.S. Senate election, as Inhofe was nearly 55 years older than Broyles.

== Republican primary ==
=== Candidates ===
==== Nominee ====
- Jim Inhofe, incumbent U.S. Senator

==== Eliminated in primary ====
- Neil Mavis, Wi-Fi engineer and Libertarian nominee for Oklahoma's 2nd congressional district in 2000
- J.J. Stitt, farmer and gun shop owner
- John Tompkins, orthopedic surgeon

==== Declined ====
- Scott Pruitt, former administrator of the Environmental Protection Agency, former attorney general of Oklahoma, and former state senator

=== Endorsements ===
Jim Inhofe

U.S. executive branch officials

- Donald Trump, President of the United States

U.S. representatives

- Frank Lucas, U.S. representative from Oklahoma's 3rd congressional district

State officials

- Kevin Stitt, Governor of Oklahoma

=== Results ===
Results by county: Inhofe: 40–50%; 60–70%; 70–80%; 80–90%

Republican primary results
Party	Candidate	Votes	%
Republican	Jim Inhofe (incumbent)	277,868	74.05
Republican	J.J. Stitt	57,433	15.31
Republican	John Tompkins	23,563	6.28
Republican	Neil Mavis	16,363	4.36
Total votes		375,227	100.00

== Democratic primary ==
=== Candidates ===
==== Nominee ====
- Abby Broyles, attorney and former KFOR news reporter

==== Eliminated in primary ====
- Sheila Bilyeu, perennial candidate
- Elysabeth Britt, human resources professional and candidate for Oklahoma's 5th congressional district in 2018
- R. O. Joe Cassity Jr., lawyer and retired college professor

==== Withdrawn ====
- Dylan Billings, political science professor
- Tyler Dougherty, software developer
- Bevon Rogers, former oil and gas industrialist (ran for state senate)
- Paul Tay, perennial candidate (ran for Mayor of Tulsa)
- Perry Williams
- Mike Workman, political consultant, nominee for U.S. Senate in 2016, and nominee for Oklahoma Labor Commissioner in 2014

==== Declined ====
- Brad Henry, former governor of Oklahoma

=== Endorsements ===
Abby Broyles

Organizations

- National Organization for Women

Unions

- Oklahoma Building Trades

=== Results ===
Results by county: Broyles: 30–40%; 40–50%; 50–60%; 60–70%; 70–80%; Cassity: 30–40%

Democratic primary results
Party	Candidate	Votes	%
Democratic	Abby Broyles	163,921	60.45
Democratic	Elysabeth Britt	45,206	16.67
Democratic	Sheila Bilyeu	32,350	11.93
Democratic	R. O. Joe Cassity, Jr.	29,698	10.95
Total votes		271,175	100.00

== Other candidates ==
=== Libertarian Party ===
==== Nominee ====
- Robert Murphy, nominee for U.S. Senate in 2016

=== Independents ===
==== Declared ====
- Joan Farr, 2014 candidate
- A. D. Nesbit

== General election ==
=== Predictions ===
Source	Ranking	As of
The Cook Political Report	Safe R	October 29, 2020
Inside Elections	Safe R	October 28, 2020
Sabato's Crystal Ball	Safe R	November 2, 2020
Daily Kos	Safe R	October 30, 2020
Politico	Safe R	November 2, 2020
RCP	Safe R	October 23, 2020
DDHQ	Safe R	November 3, 2020
538	Safe R	November 2, 2020
Economist	Safe R	November 2, 2020

=== Additional general election endorsements ===
Abby Broyles (D)

U.S. senators

- Elizabeth Warren, U.S. senator from Massachusetts and candidate for President of the United States in 2020

U.S. representatives

- Katie Hill, former U.S. representative from California's 25th congressional district
- Eric Swalwell, U.S. representative from California's 15th congressional district and candidate for President of the United States in 2020

Local officials

- Pete Buttigieg, former mayor of South Bend, Indiana, and candidate for President of the United States in 2020

Organizations

- End Citizens United
- Let America Vote
- National Women's Political Caucus
- Patriotic Millionaires
- Sierra Club

Unions

- National Education Association
- United Auto Workers

=== Polling ===
View source data.

Poll source	Date(s) administered	Sample size (Note: Key: A – all adults RV – registered voters LV – likely voters V – unclear)	Margin of error	Jim Inhofe (R)	Abby Broyles (D)	Other	Undecided
SoonerPoll	October 15–20, 2020	5,466 (LV)	± 1.33%	56%	37%	2% (Note: Farr (I), Murphy (L) and Nesbitt (I) with 1%)	4%
Amber Integrated	September 17–20, 2020	500 (LV)	± 4.4%	46%	30%	5% (Note: Murphy (L) and Nesbit (I) with 2%; Farr (I) with 1%)	19%
SoonerPoll	September 2–8, 2020	486 (LV)	± 4.45%	57%	33%	3% (Note: Murphy (L) with 2%; Farr (I) with 1%)	6%
DFM Research (D) (Note: Poll conducted for Abby Broyles.)	July 29–30, 2020	572 (LV)	± 4.1%	50%	34%	5% (Note: "Independent candidate" with 5%)	11%
Amber Integrated	March 5–8, 2020	500 (LV)	± 4.4%	57%	31%	–	12%
Abby Broyles	Released February 17, 2020	– (V) (Note: Not yet released)	–	56%	44%	–	–

Hypothetical polling

with generic Democrat

Poll source	Date(s) administered	Sample size	Margin of error	Jim Inhofe (R)	Generic Democrat (D)	Undecided
Amber Integrated	June 3–4, 2020	500 (LV)	± 4.4%	54%	34%	12%

=== Results ===
United States Senate election in Oklahoma, 2020
Party	Candidate	Votes	%	±%
Republican	Jim Inhofe (incumbent)	979,140	62.91%	–5.10
Democratic	Abby Broyles	509,763	32.75%	+4.20
Libertarian	Robert Murphy	34,435	2.21%	N/A
Independent	Joan Farr	21,652	1.39%	+0.11
Independent	A. D. Nesbit	11,371	0.73%	N/A
Total votes		1,556,361	100.0%	N/A
Republican hold				

==== By county ====
County	Jim Inhofe Republican		Abby Broyles Democratic		Robert Murphy Libertarian		Joan Farr Independent		A. D. Nesbit Independent		Margin		Total votes
County	#	%	#	%	#	%	#	%	#	%	#	%	Total votes
Adair	5,134	72.58	1,615	22.83	138	1.95	124	1.75	63	0.89	3,519	49.75	7,074
Alfalfa	1,899	84.10	262	11.60	46	2.04	38	1.68	13	0.58	1,637	72.50	2,258
Atoka	4,380	81.93	798	14.93	83	1.55	54	1.01	31	0.58	3,582	67.00	5,346
Beaver	1,889	87.29	195	9.01	43	1.99	22	1.02	15	0.69	1,694	78.28	2,164
Beckham	6,417	80.95	1,196	15.09	178	2.25	89	1.12	47	0.59	5,221	65.86	7,927
Blaine	2,987	76.87	751	19.33	65	1.67	59	1.52	24	0.62	2,236	57.54	3,886
Bryan	11,928	74.99	3,335	20.97	358	2.25	185	1.16	101	0.63	8,593	54.02	15,907
Caddo	6,761	68.72	2,665	27.09	186	1.89	151	1.53	75	0.76	4,096	41.63	9,838
Canadian	41,519	67.31	17,386	28.19	1,525	2.47	818	1.33	433	0.70	24,133	39.12	61,681
Carter	14,344	73.85	4,352	22.41	345	1.78	243	1.25	140	0.72	9,992	51.44	19,424
Cherokee	10,249	58.03	6,519	36.91	436	2.47	302	1.71	156	0.88	3,730	21.12	17,662
Choctaw	4,555	78.51	1,070	18.44	74	1.28	67	1.15	36	0.62	3,485	60.07	5,802
Cimarron	948	90.89	64	6.14	14	1.34	11	1.05	6	0.58	884	84.75	1,043
Cleveland	64,540	53.98	49,632	41.51	2,890	2.42	1,635	1.37	857	0.72	14,908	12.47	119,554
Coal	1,964	79.16	430	17.33	33	1.33	30	1.21	24	0.97	1,534	61.83	2,481
Comanche	21,026	59.25	12,687	35.75	852	2.40	596	1.68	327	0.92	8,339	23.50	35,488
Cotton	2,114	82.51	358	13.97	39	1.52	33	1.29	18	0.70	1,756	68.54	2,562
Craig	4,278	71.22	1,446	24.07	144	2.40	94	1.56	45	0.75	2,832	47.14	6,007
Creek	22,097	72.63	6,956	22.86	688	2.26	486	1.60	199	0.65	15,141	49.77	30,426
Custer	7,735	72.54	2,454	23.01	275	2.58	134	1.26	65	0.61	5,281	49.53	10,663
Delaware	12,829	74.67	3,700	21.54	283	1.65	249	1.45	120	0.70	9,129	53.13	17,181
Dewey	2,045	86.87	253	10.75	29	1.23	20	0.85	7	0.30	1,792	76.12	2,354
Ellis	1,621	86.87	187	10.02	28	1.50	18	0.96	12	0.64	1,434	76.85	1,866
Garfield	16,306	72.96	5,006	22.40	519	2.32	332	1.49	185	0.83	11,300	50.56	22,348
Garvin	8,504	78.11	1,993	18.31	164	1.51	137	1.26	89	0.82	6,511	59.80	10,887
Grady	17,700	76.81	4,503	19.54	397	1.72	283	1.23	160	0.69	13,197	57.27	23,043
Grant	1,835	82.84	304	13.72	37	1.67	24	1.08	15	0.68	1,531	69.12	2,215
Greer	1,534	78.35	347	17.72	40	2.04	19	0.97	18	0.92	1,187	60.63	1,958
Harmon	730	78.24	182	19.51	12	1.29	6	0.64	3	0.32	548	58.73	933
Harper	1,290	87.04	144	9.72	18	1.21	22	1.48	8	0.54	1,146	77.32	1,482
Haskell	3,892	78.20	926	18.61	81	1.63	49	0.98	29	0.58	2,966	59.59	4,977
Hughes	3,660	75.81	1,002	20.75	75	1.55	65	1.35	26	0.54	2,658	55.06	4,828
Jackson	6,407	78.24	1,447	17.67	194	2.37	100	1.22	41	0.50	4,960	60.57	8,189
Jefferson	1,943	82.37	323	13.69	45	1.91	32	1.36	16	0.68	1,620	68.68	2,359
Johnston	3,318	78.66	749	17.76	68	1.61	57	1.35	26	0.62	2,569	60.90	4,218
Kay	12,219	71.07	4,159	24.19	369	2.15	286	1.66	161	0.94	8,060	46.88	17,194
Kingfisher	5,332	82.62	895	13.87	130	2.01	73	1.13	24	0.37	4,437	68.75	6,454
Kiowa	2,592	75.77	730	21.34	57	1.67	23	0.67	19	0.56	1,862	54.43	3,421
Latimer	3,172	75.18	883	20.93	67	1.59	57	1.35	40	0.95	2,289	54.25	4,219
Le Flore	14,484	77.68	3,462	18.57	320	1.72	269	1.44	110	0.59	11,022	59.11	18,645
Lincoln	11,445	77.16	2,767	18.65	312	2.10	205	1.38	104	0.70	8,678	58.51	14,833
Logan	15,044	70.00	5,542	25.79	516	2.40	247	1.15	141	0.66	9,502	44.21	21,490
Love	3,230	79.58	701	17.27	56	1.38	44	1.08	28	0.69	2,529	62.31	4,059
Major	2,992	86.45	348	10.05	71	2.05	39	1.13	11	0.32	2,644	76.40	3,461
Marshall	12,219	71.07	4,159	24.19	369	2.15	286	1.66	161	0.94	8,060	46.88	17,194
Mayes	11,826	71.42	3,973	23.99	353	2.13	272	1.64	134	0.81	7,853	47.43	16,558
McClain	14,603	76.09	3,861	20.12	397	2.07	213	1.11	119	0.62	10,742	55.97	19,193
McCurtain	9,021	79.61	1,941	17.13	172	1.52	132	1.16	66	0.58	7,080	62.48	11,332
McIntosh	5,733	69.16	2,235	26.96	143	1.72	114	1.38	65	0.78	3,498	42.20	8,290
Murray	4,400	74.91	1,252	21.31	108	1.84	75	1.28	39	0.66	3,148	53.60	5,874
Muskogee	15,529	62.06	8,381	33.50	504	2.01	396	1.58	211	0.84	7,148	28.56	25,021
Noble	3,603	73.02	1,098	22.25	123	2.49	71	1.44	39	0.79	2,505	50.77	4,934
Nowata	3,374	77.03	814	18.58	90	2.05	69	1.58	33	0.75	2,560	58.45	4,380
Okfuskee	2,865	71.34	991	24.68	69	1.72	62	1.54	29	0.72	1,874	46.66	4,016
Oklahoma	142,092	48.29	139,559	47.43	6,545	2.22	3,799	1.29	2,252	0.77	2,533	0.86	294,247
Okmulgee	9,114	63.85	4,510	31.60	295	2.07	229	1.60	126	0.88	4,604	32.25	14,274
Osage	13,276	64.79	6,336	30.92	429	2.09	314	1.53	136	0.66	6,940	33.87	20,491
Ottawa	7,283	64.27	3,283	28.97	331	2.92	267	2.36	168	1.48	4,000	35.30	11,332
Pawnee	4,937	73.06	1,459	21.59	166	2.46	133	1.97	62	0.92	3,478	51.47	6,757
Payne	17,114	57.83	11,010	37.20	863	2.92	388	1.31	218	0.74	6,104	20.63	29,593
Pittsburg	13,102	73.33	4,032	22.57	343	1.92	263	1.47	128	0.72	9,070	50.76	17,868
Pontotoc	10,418	68.29	4,168	27.32	351	2.30	191	1.25	128	0.84	6,250	40.97	15,256
Pottawatomie	19,257	68.49	7,646	27.19	604	2.15	363	1.29	247	0.88	11,611	41.30	28,117
Pushmataha	3,836	81.43	714	15.16	80	1.70	53	1.13	28	0.59	3,122	66.27	4,711
Roger Mills	1,528	84.05	233	12.82	29	1.60	15	0.83	13	0.72	1,295	71.23	1,818
Rogers	32,109	72.24	10,226	23.01	1,134	2.55	693	1.56	288	0.65	21,883	49.23	44,450
Seminole	5,726	68.81	2,294	27.57	133	1.60	103	1.24	66	0.79	3,432	41.24	8,322
Sequoyah	11,370	74.46	3,327	21.79	281	1.84	194	1.27	97	0.64	8,043	52.68	15,269
Stephens	15,216	80.18	3,122	16.45	340	1.79	208	1.10	91	0.48	12,094	63.73	18,977
Texas	4,368	79.35	853	15.50	149	2.71	97	1.76	38	0.69	3,515	63.85	5,505
Tillman	2,077	76.87	541	20.02	31	1.15	33	1.22	20	0.74	1,536	56.85	2,702
Tulsa	145,369	54.59	108,869	40.88	6,250	2.35	3,875	1.46	1,935	0.73	36,500	13.71	266,298
Wagoner	24,863	70.50	8,851	25.10	776	2.20	530	1.50	246	0.70	16,012	45.40	35,266
Washington	16,417	70.02	5,898	25.16	589	2.51	393	1.68	148	0.63	10,519	44.87	23,445
Washita	3,887	81.45	702	14.71	98	2.05	61	1.28	24	0.50	3,185	66.74	4,772
Woods	2,851	77.64	667	18.16	84	2.29	50	1.36	20	0.54	2,184	59.48	3,672
Woodward	6,319	81.37	1,105	14.23	185	2.38	106	1.36	51	0.66	5,214	67.14	7,766
Totals	979,140	62.91	509,763	32.75	34,435	2.21	21,652	1.39	11,371	0.73	469,377	30.16	1,556,361

==== By congressional district ====
Inhofe won all five congressional districts.

District	Infohe	Broyles	Representative
1st	58%	38%	Kevin Hern
2nd	72%	24%	Markwayne Mullin
3rd	72%	24%	Frank Lucas
4th	64%	32%	Tom Cole
5th	50%	45%	Kendra Horn (116th Congress)
5th	50%	45%	Stephanie Bice (117th Congress)

== Notes ==
Partisan clients

Voter samples and additional candidates
