= 2014 United States House of Representatives elections in Oklahoma =

- November 4, 2014

All 5 Oklahoma seats to the United States House of Representatives
	Majority party	Minority party
Party	Republican	Democratic
Last election	5	0
Seats won	5	0
Seat change	Steady	Steady
Popular vote	457,613	174,022
Percentage	70.03%	26.63%
Swing	▲5.41%	▼4.32%
- Republican 50–60% 60–70% 70–80% 80–90% >90%

The 2014 United States House of Representatives elections in Oklahoma were held on Tuesday, November 4, 2014, to elect the five U.S. representatives from the state of Oklahoma, one from each of the state's five congressional districts. The elections coincided with other elections to the United States Senate and House of Representatives and various state and local elections, including the Governor of Oklahoma and both of Oklahoma's United States Senate seats. Primary elections were held on June 24, 2014. Primary runoffs were held on August 26, 2014, in contests where no candidate won more than 50% of the vote.

== Overview ==
Results of the 2014 United States House of Representatives elections in Oklahoma by district:

District	Republican		Democratic		Others		Total		Result
District	Votes	%	Votes	%	Votes	%	Votes	%	Result
District 1	–	–	–	–	–	–	–	–	Republican hold
District 2	110,925	70.03%	38,964	24.60%	8,518	5.38%	158,407	100.00%	Republican hold
District 3	133,335	78.62%	36,270	21.38%	0	0.00%	169,605	100.00%	Republican hold
District 4	117,721	70.80%	40,998	24.66%	7,549	4.54%	166,268	100.00%	Republican hold
District 5	95,632	60.10%	57,790	36.32%	5,711	3.59%	159,133	100.00%	Republican hold
Total	457,613	70.04%	174,022	26.63%	21,778	3.33%	653,413	100.00%	

== District 1 ==
2014 Oklahoma's 1st congressional district election
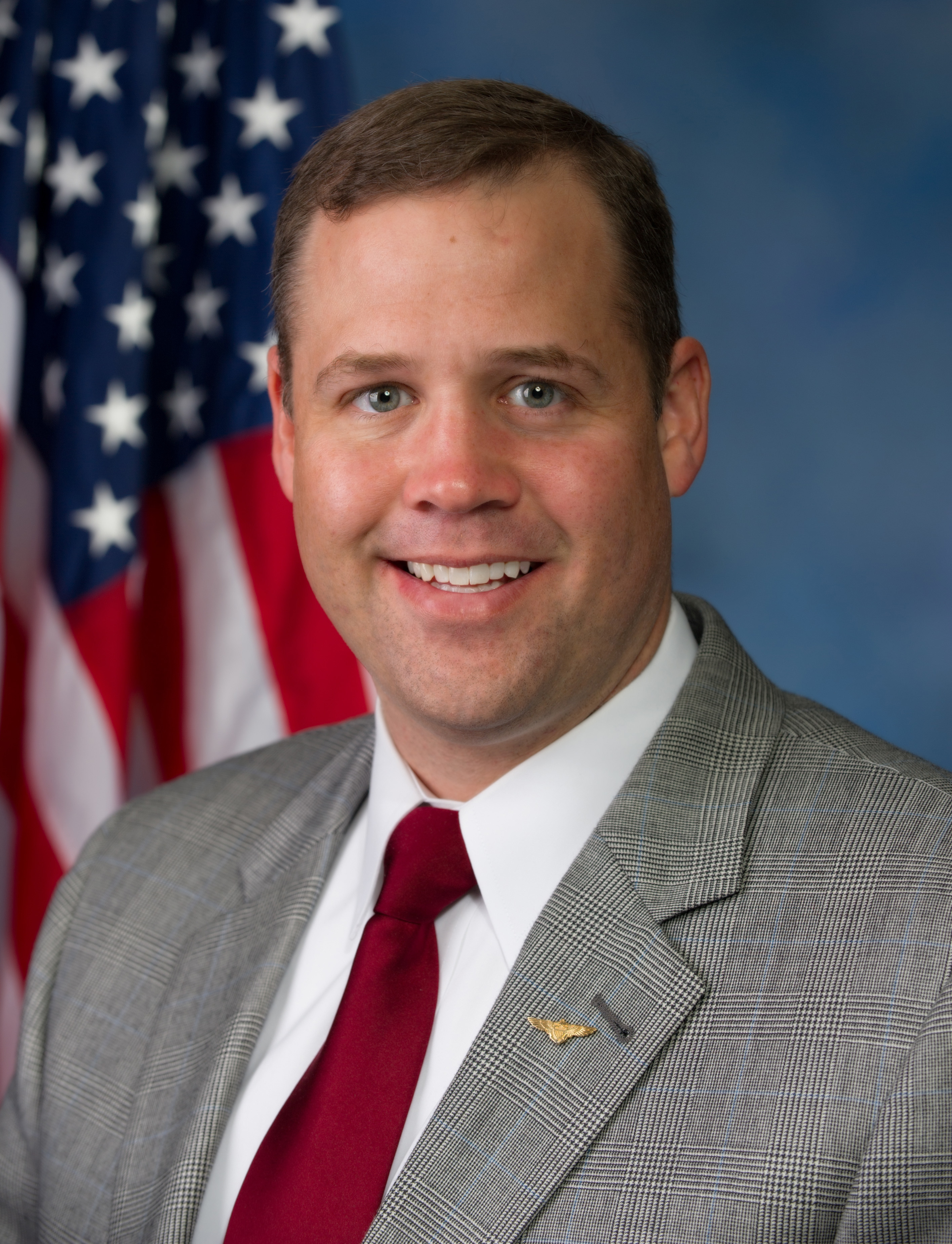
Nominee	Jim Bridenstine
Party	Republican
Popular vote	Unopposed
U.S. Representative before election
Jim Bridenstine
Republican
Elected U.S. Representative
Jim Bridenstine
Republican

The 1st district is located in the Tulsa metropolitan area and includes Creek, Rogers, Tulsa, Wagoner and Washington counties. Incumbent Republican Jim Bridenstine, who had represented the district since 2013, ran for re-election. He was elected with 64% of the vote in 2012 having defeated incumbent Republican John Sullivan in the Republican primary with 54% of the vote. The district had a PVI of R+18.

=== Republican primary ===
==== Candidates ====
===== Nominee =====
- Jim Bridenstine, incumbent U.S. Representative

=== Democratic primary ===
==== Candidates ====
===== Declined =====
- Kathy Taylor, former Mayor of Tulsa

=== General Election ===
Bridenstine ran unopposed for re-election.

==== Predictions ====
Source	Ranking	As of
The Cook Political Report	Safe R	November 3, 2014
Rothenberg	Safe R	October 24, 2014
Sabato's Crystal Ball	Safe R	October 30, 2014
RCP	Safe R	November 2, 2014
Daily Kos Elections	Safe R	November 4, 2014

==== Results ====
Oklahoma's 1st congressional district, 2014
Party	Candidate	Votes	%
Republican	Jim Bridenstine (incumbent)	Unopposed	N/a
Total votes			N/a
Republican hold			

== District 2 ==
2014 Oklahoma's 2nd congressional district election
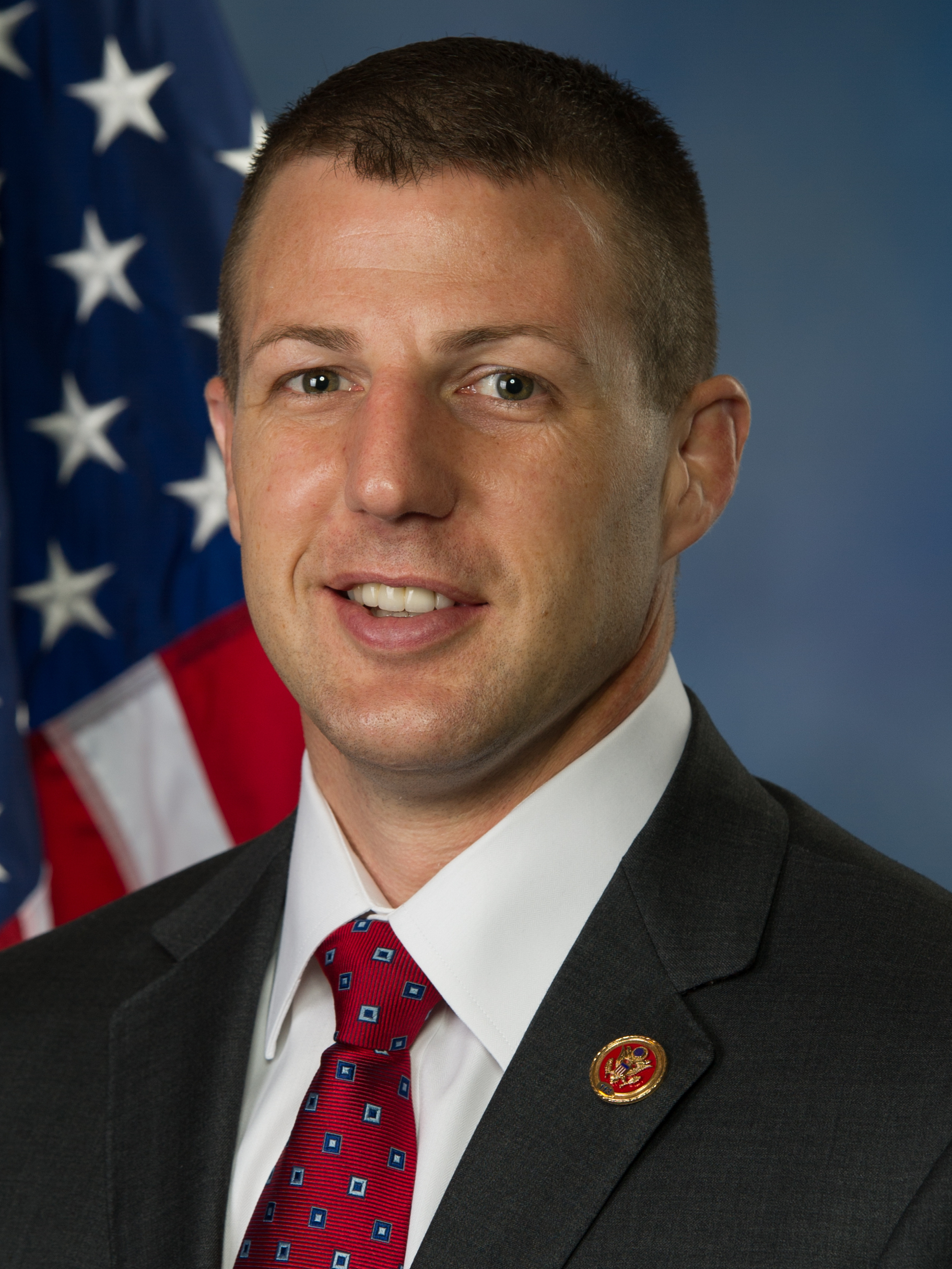

Nominee	Markwayne Mullin	Earl Everett
Party	Republican	Democratic
Popular vote	110,925	38,964
Percentage	70.0%	24.6%
- Precinct and county-level results Mullin: 40–50% 50–60% 60–70% 70–80% 80–90% 90–100% Everett: 40–50% 50–60% 60–70% 70–80% 80–90% No votes
U.S. Representative before election
Markwayne Mullin
Republican
Elected U.S. Representative
Markwayne Mullin
Republican

The 2nd district is located in Green Country and Kiamichi Country and includes the city of Muskogee and numerous sparsely populated counties. Incumbent Republican Markwayne Mullin, who had represented the district since 2013, ran for re-election. He was elected with 57% of the vote in 2012, succeeding retiring Democratic incumbent Dan Boren. The district had a PVI of R+20.

=== Republican primary ===
==== Candidates ====
===== Nominee =====
- Markwayne Mullin, incumbent U.S. Representative

===== Eliminated in primary =====
- Darrell Robertson, farmer

==== Results ====
Republican primary results
Party	Candidate	Votes	%
Republican	Markwayne Mullin (incumbent)	26,245	79.7
Republican	Darrell Robertson	6,673	20.3
Total votes		32,918	100.0

=== Democratic primary ===
==== Candidates ====
===== Nominee =====
- Earl E. Everett, candidate for this seat in 2012

===== Eliminated in primary =====
- Joshua Harris-Till

==== Results ====
Democratic primary results
Party	Candidate	Votes	%
Democratic	Earl E. Everett	33,119	62.6
Democratic	Joshua Harris-Till	19,813	37.4
Total votes		52,932	100.0

=== General election ===
==== Predictions ====
Source	Ranking	As of
The Cook Political Report	Safe R	November 3, 2014
Rothenberg	Safe R	October 24, 2014
Sabato's Crystal Ball	Safe R	October 30, 2014
RCP	Safe R	November 2, 2014
Daily Kos Elections	Safe R	November 4, 2014

==== Results ====
Oklahoma's 2nd congressional district, 2014
Party	Candidate	Votes	%
Republican	Markwayne Mullin (incumbent)	110,925	70.0
Democratic	Earl Everett	38,964	24.6
Independent	Jon Douthitt	8,518	5.4
Total votes		158,407	100.0
Republican hold			

== District 3 ==
2014 Oklahoma's 3rd congressional district election
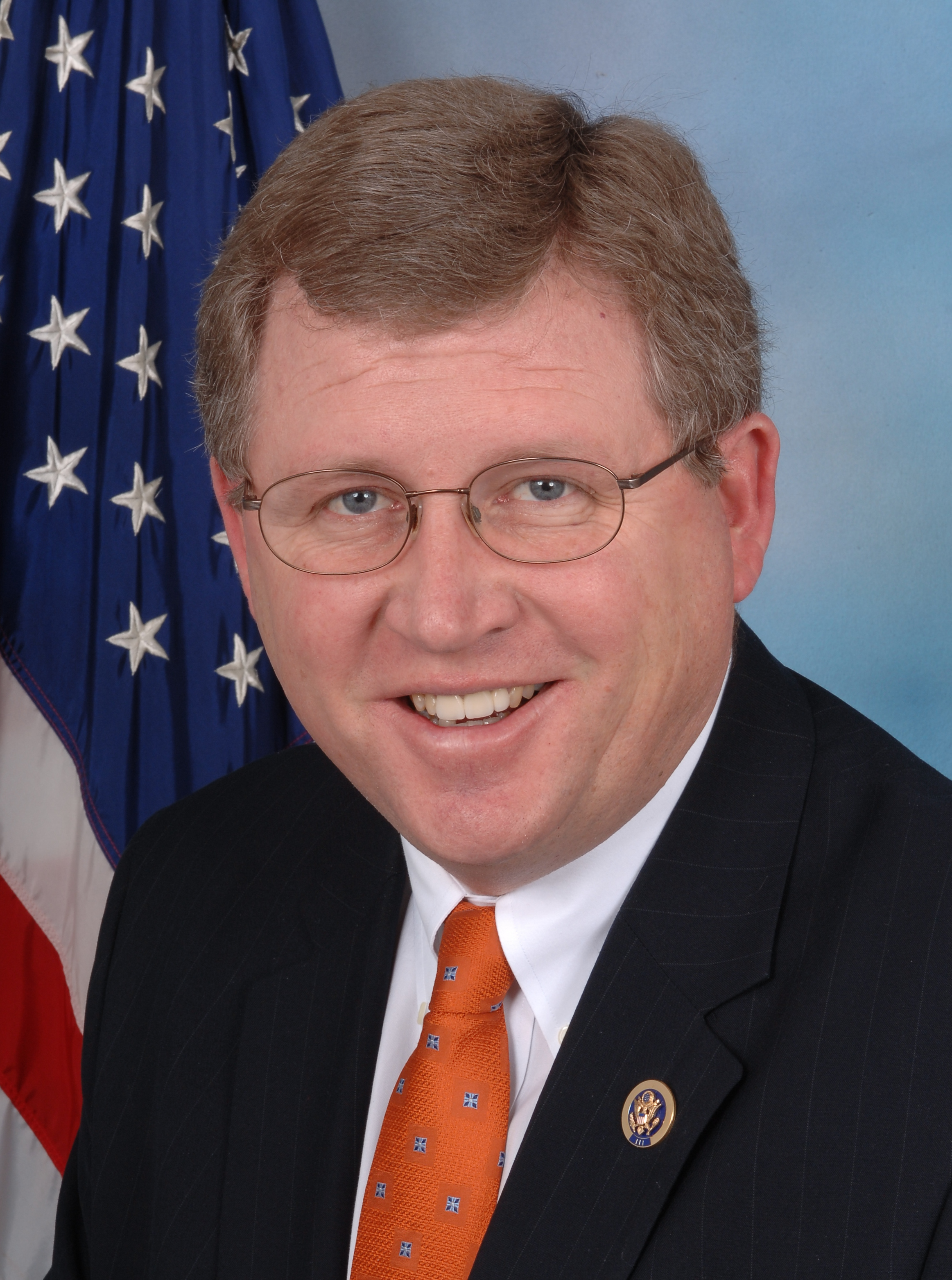

Nominee	Frank Lucas	Frankie Robbins
Party	Republican	Democratic
Popular vote	133,335	36,270
Percentage	78.6%	21.4%
- Precinct and county-level results Lucas: 50–60% 60–70% 70–80% 80–90% 90–100% Robbins: 50–60% 70–80% 80–90% 90–100% No votes
U.S. Representative before election
Frank Lucas
Republican
Elected U.S. Representative
Frank Lucas
Republican

The 3rd district is located in Western Oklahoma. The largest district in Oklahoma and one of the largest in the country, it includes the Oklahoma Panhandle, Ponca City and the city of Stillwater as well as the Osage Nation. Incumbent Republican Frank Lucas, who had represented the district since 2003 and previously represented the 6th district from 1994 to 2003, ran for re-election. He was re-elected with 75% of the vote in 2012 and the district had a PVI of R+26.

=== Republican primary ===
The Club for Growth announced that they intended to support a Republican challenger to Lucas in the primary election, calling him a "Republican In Name Only".

==== Candidates ====
===== Nominee =====
- Frank Lucas, incumbent U.S. Representative

===== Eliminated in primary =====
- Robert Hubbard, businessman and candidate for Governor in 2010
- Timothy Ray Murray, businessman and Democratic nominee for this seat in 2012

==== Results ====
Republican primary results
Party	Candidate	Votes	%
Republican	Frank Lucas (incumbent)	54,847	82.8
Republican	Robert Hubbard	7,925	12.0
Republican	Timothy Ray Murray	3,449	5.2
Total votes		66,221	100.0

=== Democratic primary ===
==== Candidates ====
===== Nominee =====
- Frankie Robbins, engineer and United States Forest Service employee, candidate for this seat in 2012 and the nominee for the seat in 2008 and 2010

=== General election ===
==== Predictions ====
Source	Ranking	As of
The Cook Political Report	Safe R	November 3, 2014
Rothenberg	Safe R	October 24, 2014
Sabato's Crystal Ball	Safe R	October 30, 2014
RCP	Safe R	November 2, 2014
Daily Kos Elections	Safe R	November 4, 2014

==== Results ====
Oklahoma's 3rd congressional district, 2014
Party	Candidate	Votes	%
Republican	Frank Lucas (incumbent)	133,335	78.6
Democratic	Frankie Robbins	36,270	21.4
Total votes		169,605	100.0
Republican hold			

== District 4 ==
2014 Oklahoma's 4th congressional district election
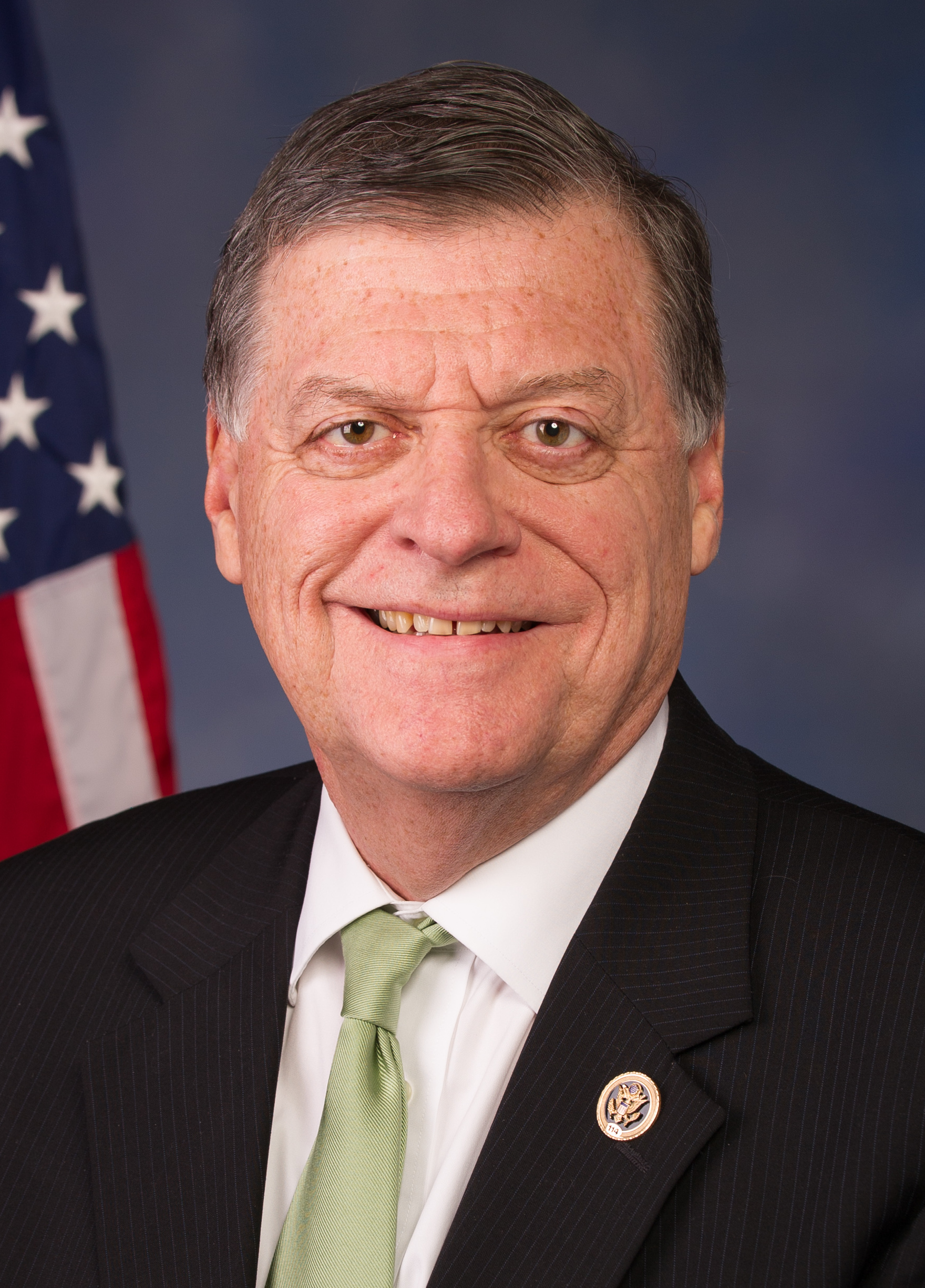

Nominee	Tom Cole	Bert Smith
Party	Republican	Democratic
Popular vote	117,721	40,998
Percentage	70.8%	24.7%
- Precinct and county-level results
U.S. Representative before election
Tom Cole
Republican
Elected U.S. Representative
Tom Cole
Republican

Cole: 40–50% 50–60% 60–70% 70–80% 80–90%
Smith: 40–50% 50–60% 60–70% 70–80% 90–100%
No votes

The 4th district is located in South Central Oklahoma and includes Canadian, Comanche and Cleveland counties as well as numerous other sparsely populated counties. Incumbent Republican Tom Cole, who had represented the district since 2003, ran for re-election. He was re-elected with 68% of the vote in 2012 and the district had a PVI of R+19.

=== Republican primary ===
==== Candidates ====
===== Nominee =====
- Tom Cole, incumbent U.S. Representative

===== Eliminated in primary =====
- Anna Flatt, chair of the Carter County Republican Party

==== Results ====
Republican primary results
Party	Candidate	Votes	%
Republican	Tom Cole (incumbent)	40,790	84.4
Republican	Anna Flatt	7,511	15.6
Total votes		48,301	100.0

=== Democratic primary ===
==== Candidates ====
===== Nominee =====
- Bert Smith, retired teacher and retired United States Army Reserve lieutenant colonel, nominee for the 5th district in 2004, candidate for the 5th district in 2006 and 2008 and candidate for this seat in 2012

===== Eliminated in primary =====
- Tae Si, software engineer

==== Results ====
Democratic primary results
Party	Candidate	Votes	%
Democratic	Bert Smith	24,268	81.6
Democratic	Tae Si	5,485	18.4
Total votes		29,753	100.0

=== General election ===
==== Predictions ====
Source	Ranking	As of
The Cook Political Report	Safe R	November 3, 2014
Rothenberg	Safe R	October 24, 2014
Sabato's Crystal Ball	Safe R	October 30, 2014
RCP	Safe R	November 2, 2014
Daily Kos Elections	Safe R	November 4, 2014

==== Results ====
Oklahoma's 4th congressional district, 2014
Party	Candidate	Votes	%
Republican	Tom Cole (incumbent)	117,721	70.8
Democratic	Bert Smith	40,998	24.7
Independent	Dennis Johnson	7,549	4.5
Total votes		166,268	100.0
Republican hold			

== District 5 ==
2014 Oklahoma's 5th congressional district election
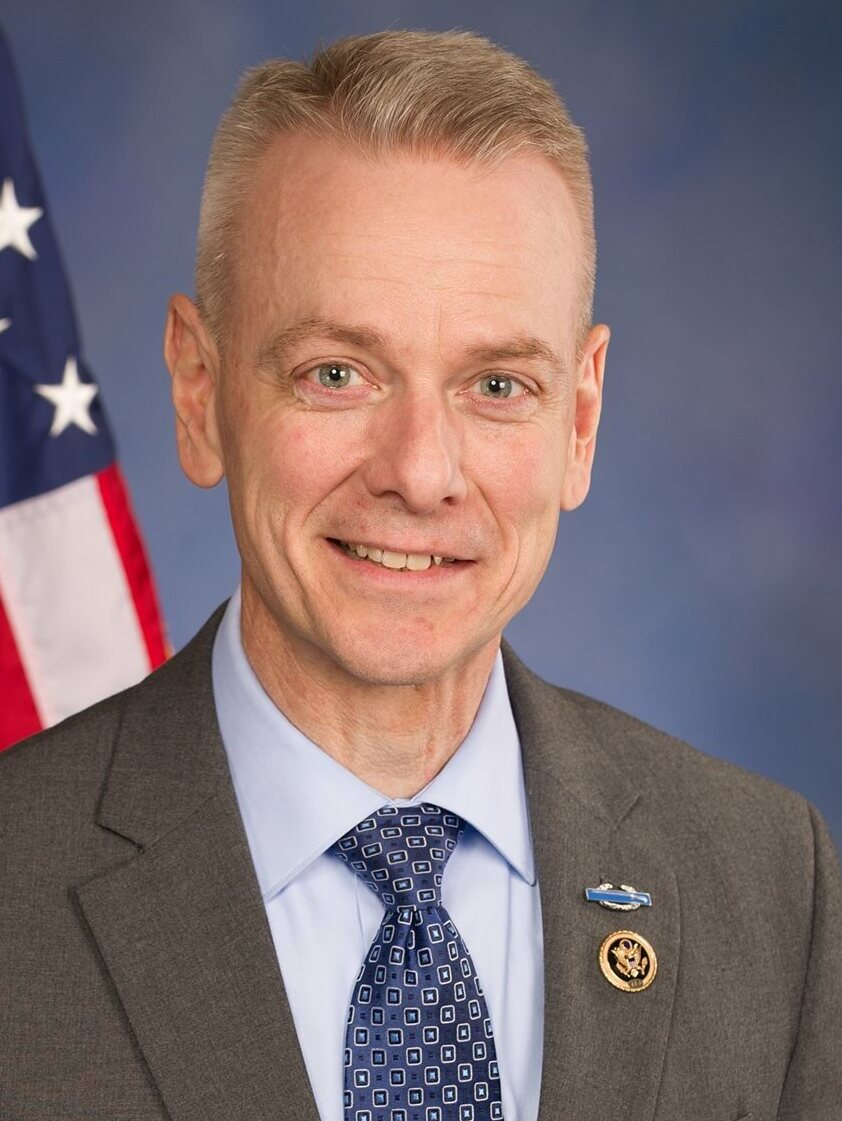

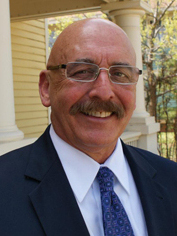
Nominee	Steve Russell	Al McAffrey
Party	Republican	Democratic
Popular vote	95,632	57,790
Percentage	60.1%	36.3%
- Precinct and county-level results Russell: 40–50% 50–60% 60–70% 70–80% 80–90% McAffrey: 40–50% 50–60% 60–70% 70–80% 80–90% ≥90% No votes
U.S. Representative before election
James Lankford
Republican
Elected U.S. Representative
Steve Russell
Republican

The 5th district is located in Central Oklahoma and includes Oklahoma, Pottawatomie and Seminole counties. The incumbent is Republican James Lankford, who had represented the district since 2011, did not run for re-election. He instead ran in the special election to replace retiring Republican U.S. Senator Tom Coburn. He was re-elected with 59% of the vote in 2012 and the district had a PVI of R+12.

=== Republican primary ===
==== Candidates ====
===== Nominee =====
- Steve Russell, former state senator

===== Eliminated in primary =====
- Patrice Douglas, chairman of the Oklahoma Corporation Commission and former mayor of Edmond
- Shane Jett, former state representative
- Clark Jolley, state senator
- Harvey Sparks, minister and former aide to U.S. Representative Jim Bridenstine
- Mike Turner, state representative

===== Withdrew =====
- James Lankford, incumbent U.S. Representative (running for the U.S. Senate)

===== Declined =====
- Mick Cornett, Mayor of Oklahoma City
- David Holt, state senator
- Tom Newell, state representative

==== Polling ====
Poll source	Date(s) administered	Sample size	Margin of error	Patrice Douglas	Shane Jett	Clark Jolley	Steve Russell	Harvey Sparks	Mike Turner	Undecided
SoonerPoll	June 19–21, 2014	334	± 5.36%	23	6%	12%	19%	5%	13%	22%
SoonerPoll	May 5–10, 2014	671	± 3.77%	12%	5%	11%	7%	4%	11%	49%

==== Results ====
Republican primary results
Party	Candidate	Votes	%
Republican	Steve Russell	14,604	26.6
Republican	Patrice Douglas	13,445	24.5
Republican	Clark Jolley	9,232	16.8
Republican	Mike Turner	7,760	14.1
Republican	Shane Jett	7,022	12.8
Republican	Harvey Sparks	2,898	5.3
Total votes		54,961	100.0

==== Runoff ====
Republican primary runoff results
Party	Candidate	Votes	%
Republican	Steve Russell	19,374	59.3
Republican	Patrice Douglas	13,319	40.7
Total votes		32,693	100.0

=== Democratic primary ===
==== Candidates ====
===== Nominee =====
- Al McAffrey, state senator

===== Eliminated in primary =====
- Tom Guild, University of Central Oklahoma professor and nominee for this seat 2010 and 2012
- Leona Leonard, chair of the Seminole County Democratic Party

===== Withdrew =====
- Keith Davenport, minister
- Scott Inman, Minority Leader of the Oklahoma House of Representatives (running for re-election)
- Marilyn Rainwater, pastor, retired child welfare worker and nominee for the state house in 2012 (running for the state senate)

===== Declined =====
- Anastasia Pittman, state representative (running for the state senate)
- Jim Roth, former Corporation Commissioner

==== Polling ====
Poll source	Date(s) administered	Sample size	Margin of error	Tom Guild	Leona Leonard	Al McAffrey	Undecided
SoonerPoll	June 19–21, 2014	279	± 5.86%	21%	9%	16%	54%
SoonerPoll	May 5–10, 2014	674	± 3.76%	11%	8%	16%	65%

==== Results ====
Democratic primary results
Party	Candidate	Votes	%
Democratic	Tom Guild	11,603	42.1
Democratic	Al McAffrey	8,507	30.9
Democratic	Leona Leonard	7,431	27.0
Total votes		27,541	100.0

==== Runoff ====
Democratic primary runoff results
Party	Candidate	Votes	%
Democratic	Al McAffrey	10,417	54.2
Democratic	Tom Guild	8,793	45.8
Total votes		19,210	100.0

=== Independent ===
==== Candidates ====
===== Declared =====
- Tom Boggs, resident of Thailand
- Robert T. Murphy, Libertarian and perennial candidate
- Buddy Ray

=== General election ===
==== Polling ====
Poll source	Date(s) administered	Sample size	Margin of error	Steve Russell (R)	Al McAffrey (D)	Robert Murphy (I)	Buddy Ray (I)	Undecided
News 9/SoonerPoll	October 28, 2014	762 (LV)	3.54%	55%	31%	–	–	11%
News 9/SoonerPoll	August 28–30, 2014	334 (LV)	5.36%	52%	30%	2%	2%	14%

==== Predictions ====
Source	Ranking	As of
The Cook Political Report	Safe R	November 3, 2014
Rothenberg	Safe R	October 24, 2014
Sabato's Crystal Ball	Safe R	October 30, 2014
RCP	Safe R	November 2, 2014
Daily Kos Elections	Safe R	November 4, 2014

==== Results ====
Oklahoma's 5th congressional district, 2014
Party	Candidate	Votes	%
Republican	Steve Russell	95,632	60.1
Democratic	Al McAffrey	57,790	36.3
Independent	Robert T. Murphy	2,176	1.4
Independent	Tom Boggs	2,065	1.3
Independent	Buddy Ray	1,470	0.9
Total votes		159,133	100.0
Republican hold			

== See also ==
- 2014 United States House of Representatives elections
- 2014 United States elections
