= 2004 United States House of Representatives elections in Oklahoma =

- November 2, 2004

All 5 Oklahoma seats to the United States House of Representatives
	Majority party	Minority party	Third party
Party	Republican	Democratic	Independent
Last election	4	1	0
Seats won	4	1	0
Seat change	Steady	Steady	Steady
Popular vote	875,033	389,029	110,548
Percentage	63.66%	28.30%	8.04%
Swing	▲9.08%	▼10.82%	▲1.74%

Republican
50–60%
60–70%
70–80%
80–90%
>90%
Democratic
50–60%
60–70%
70–80%

The 2004 House elections in Oklahoma occurred on November 2, 2004 to elect the members of the State of Oklahoma's delegation to the United States House of Representatives. Oklahoma had five seats in the House, apportioned according to the 2000 United States census.

These elections were held concurrently with the United States presidential election of 2004, United States Senate elections of 2004 (including one in Oklahoma), the United States House elections in other states, and various state and local elections.

== Overview ==
United States House of Representatives elections in Oklahoma, 2004
Party	Votes	Percentage	Seats before	Seats after	+/–
Republican	875,033	63.66%	4	4	±0
Democratic	389,029	28.30%	1	1	±0
Independent	110,548	8.04%	0	0	0
Totals	1,374,610	100.00%	5	5	±0
Voter turnout					

== Results ==
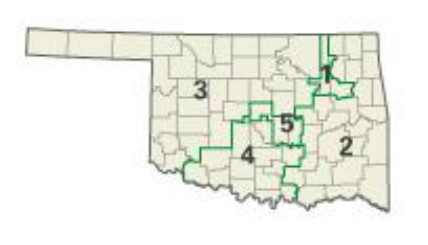
Oklahoma congressional districts in the 2004 elections

District	Incumbent	Party	First elected	Result	Candidates
Oklahoma 1	John Sullivan	Republican	2002	Re-elected	John Sullivan (R) 60.2% Doug Dodd (D) 37.5% John Krymski (I) 2.3%
Oklahoma 2	Brad Carson	Democratic	2000	Retired to run for U.S. Senate; Democratic hold	Dan Boren (D) 65.9% Wayland Smalley (R) 34.1%
Oklahoma 3	Frank Lucas	Republican	1994	Re-elected	Frank Lucas (R) 82.2% Gregory Wilson (I) 17.8%
Oklahoma 4	Tom Cole	Republican	2002	Re-elected	Tom Cole (R) 77.8% Charlene K. Bradshaw (I) 22.2%
Oklahoma 5	Ernest Istook	Republican	1992	Re-elected	Ernest Istook (R) 66.1% Bert Smith (D) 33.9%

== District 1 ==
2004 Oklahoma's 1st congressional district election
- November 2, 2004
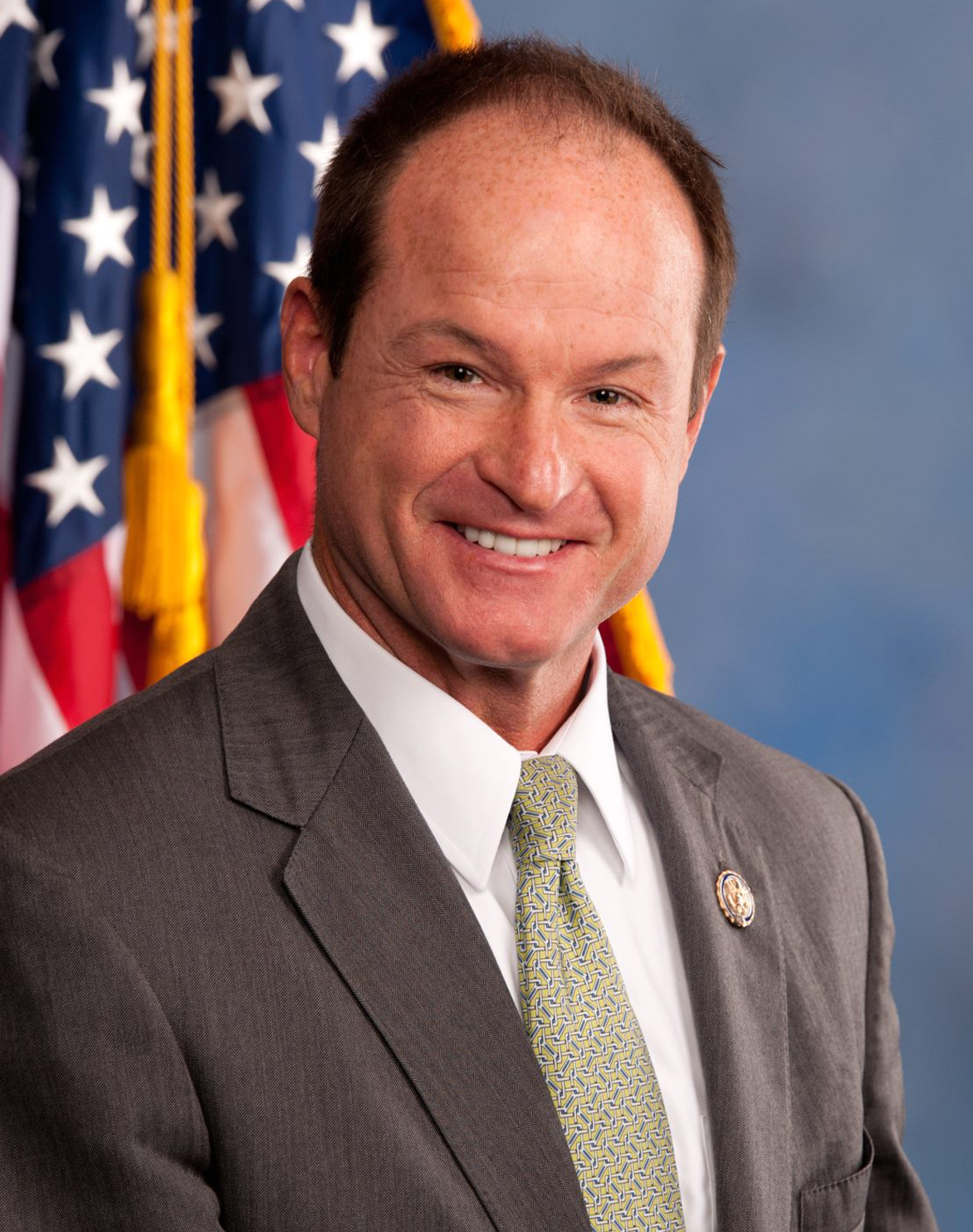

Nominee	John Sullivan	Doug Dodd
Party	Republican	Democratic
Popular vote	187,145	116,731
Percentage	60.2%	37.5%
- County results Sullivan: 50–60% 60–70%
U.S. Representative before election
John Sullivan
Republican
Elected U.S. Representative
John Sullivan
Republican

Incumbent Republican John Sullivan, who was first elected in 2002, ran for re-election. Sullivan was re-elected with 60.2% of the vote.

=== General election ===
==== Results ====
Oklahoma's 1st congressional district election, 2004
Party	Candidate	Votes	%
Republican	John Sullivan (incumbent)	187,145	60.2
Democratic	Doug Dodd	116,731	37.5
Independent	John Krymski	7,058	2.3
Total votes		310,934	100.0
Republican hold			

== District 2 ==
2004 Oklahoma's 2nd congressional district election
- November 2, 2004
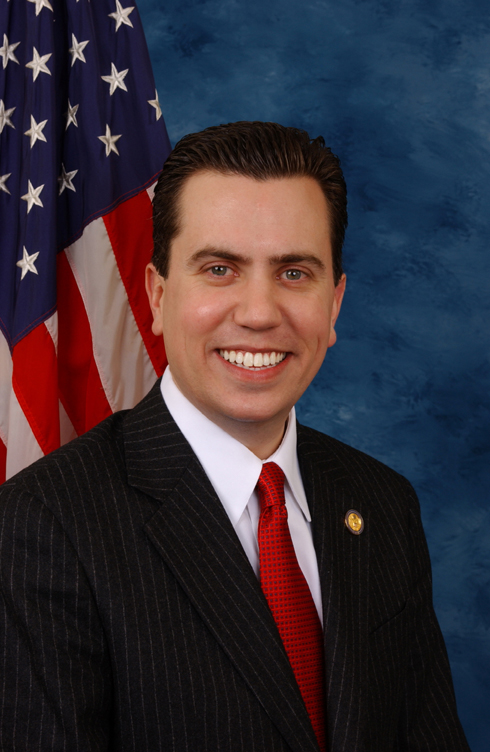

Nominee	Dan Boren	Wayland Smalley
Party	Democratic	Republican
Popular vote	179,579	92,963
Percentage	65.9%	34.1%
- County results Boren: 50–60% 60–70% 70–80%
U.S. Representative before election
Brad Carson
Democratic
Elected U.S. Representative
Dan Boren
Democratic

Incumbent Democrat Brad Carson, who was first elected in 2000, retired to run for U.S. Senate. Dan Boren won the open seat with 65.9% of the vote.

=== General election ===
==== Results ====
Oklahoma's 2nd congressional district election, 2004
Party	Candidate	Votes	%
Democratic	Dan Boren	179,579	65.9
Republican	Wayland Smalley	92,963	34.1
Total votes		272,542	100.0
Democratic hold			

== District 3 ==
2004 Oklahoma's 3rd congressional district election
- November 2, 2004
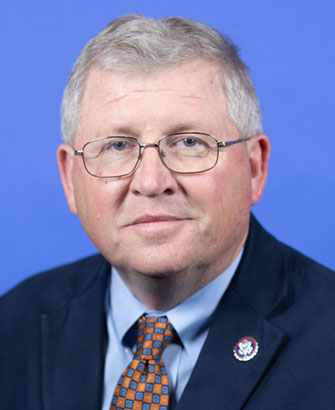

Nominee	Frank Lucas	Gregory Wilson
Party	Republican	Independent
Popular vote	215,510	46,621
Percentage	82.2%	17.8%
- County results Lucas: 60–70% 70–80% 80–90% 90–100%
U.S. Representative before election
Frank Lucas
Republican
Elected U.S. Representative
Frank Lucas
Republican

Incumbent Republican Frank Lucas, who was first elected in 1994, ran for re-election. Lucas was re-elected with 82.2% of the vote.

=== General election ===
==== Results ====
Oklahoma's 3rd congressional district election, 2004
Party	Candidate	Votes	%
Republican	Frank Lucas (incumbent)	215,510	82.2
Independent	Gregory Wilson	46,621	17.8
Total votes		262,131	100.0
Republican hold			

== District 4 ==
2004 Oklahoma's 4th congressional district election
- November 2, 2004
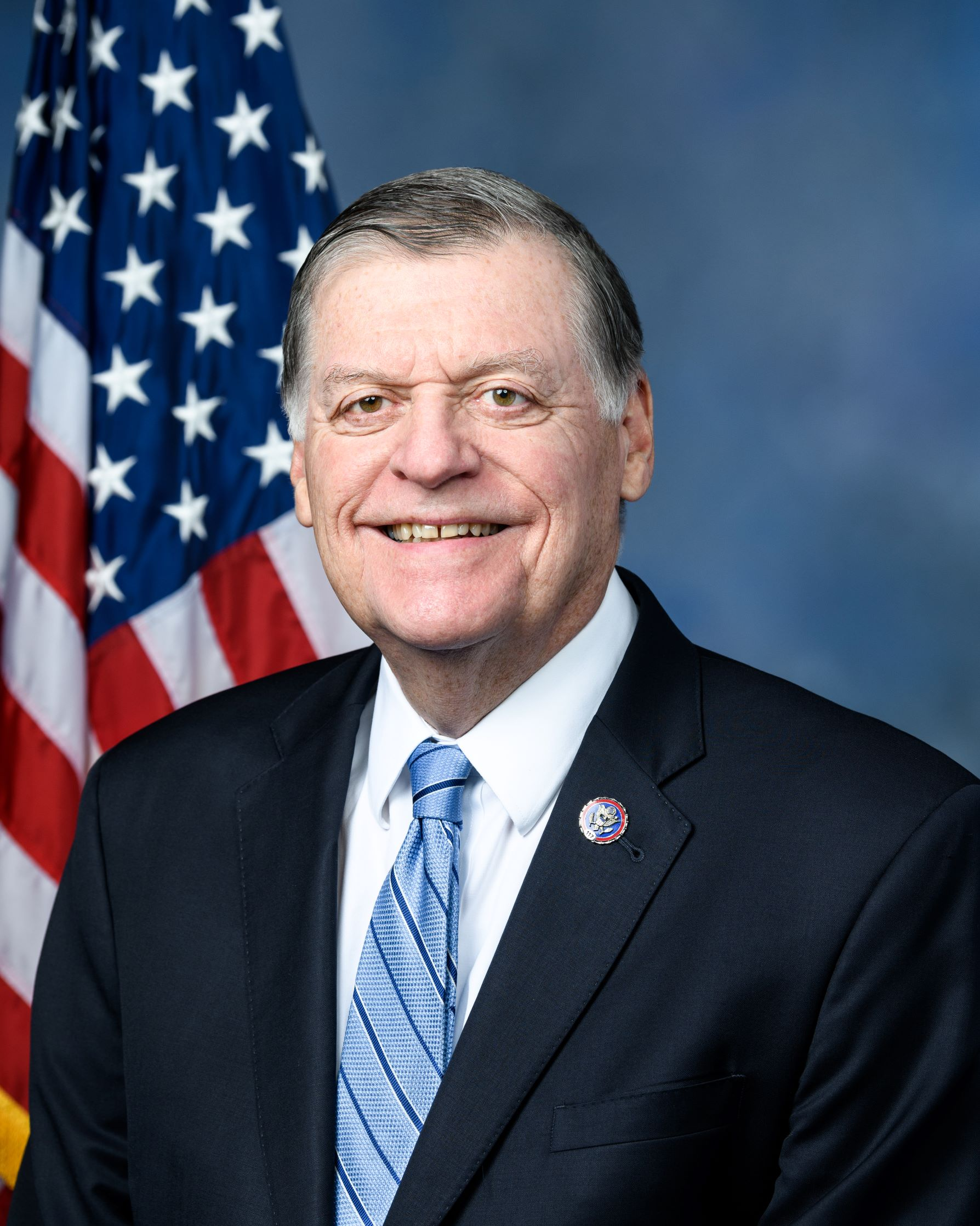

Nominee	Tom Cole	Charlene K. Bradshaw
Party	Republican	Independent
Popular vote	198,985	56,869
Percentage	77.8%	22.2%
- County results Cole: 70–80% 80–90%
U.S. Representative before election
Tom Cole
Republican
Elected U.S. Representative
Tom Cole
Republican

Incumbent Republican Tom Cole, who was first elected in 2002, ran for re-election. Cole was re-elected with 77.8% of the vote.

=== General election ===
==== Results ====
Oklahoma's 4th congressional district election, 2004
Party	Candidate	Votes	%
Republican	Tom Cole (incumbent)	198,985	77.8
Independent	Charlene K. Bradshaw	56,869	22.2
Total votes		255,854	100.0
Republican hold			

== District 5 ==
2004 Oklahoma's 5th congressional district election
- November 2, 2004
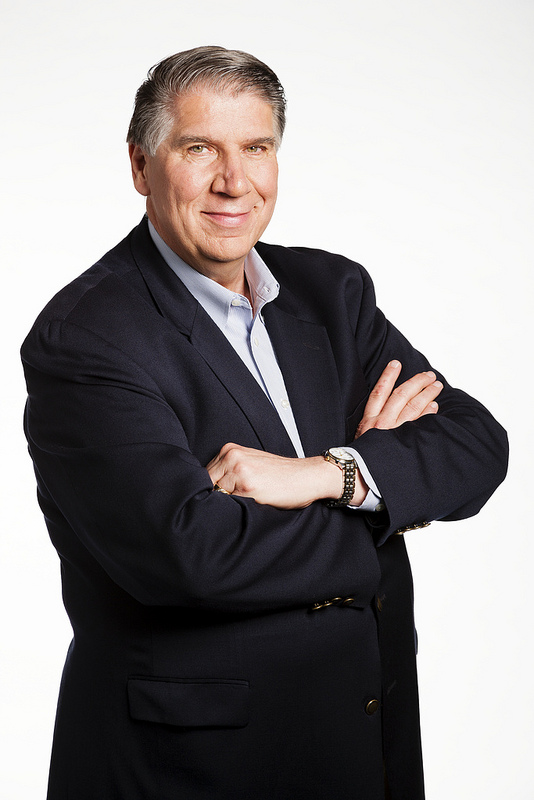

Nominee	Ernest Istook	Bert Smith
Party	Republican	Democratic
Popular vote	180,430	92,719
Percentage	66.1%	33.9%
- County results Istook: 60–70%
U.S. Representative before election
Ernest Istook
Republican
Elected U.S. Representative
Ernest Istook
Republican

Incumbent Republican Ernest Istook, who was first elected in 1992, ran for re-election. Istook was re-elected with 66.1% of the vote.

=== General election ===
==== Results ====
Oklahoma's 5th congressional district election, 2004
Party	Candidate	Votes	%
Republican	Ernest Istook (incumbent)	180,430	66.1
Democratic	Bert Smith	92,719	33.9
Total votes		273,149	100.0
Republican hold			
