= 2008 United States House of Representatives elections in Oklahoma =

- November 4, 2008

All 5 Oklahoma seats to the United States House of Representatives
	Majority party	Minority party
Party	Republican	Democratic
Last election	4	1
Seats won	4	1
Seat change	Steady	Steady
Popular vote	802,530	503,614
Percentage	60.03%	37.67%
Swing	▲2.80%	▼3.52%

Republican
40–50%
50–60%
60–70%
70–80%
80–90%
Democratic
50–60%
60–70%
70–80%

The 2008 congressional elections in Oklahoma were held on November 4, 2008, to determine who will represent the state of Oklahoma in the United States House of Representatives. Oklahoma has five seats in the House, apportioned according to the 2000 United States census. Representatives are elected for two-year terms; whoever is elected will serve in the 111th Congress from January 4, 2009, until January 3, 2011. The election coincided with the 2008 U.S. presidential election.

== Overview ==
United States House of Representatives elections in Oklahoma, 2008
Party	Votes	Percentage	Seats	+/–
Republican	802,530	60.03%	4	—
Democratic	503,614	37.67%	1	—
Independents	30,783	2.30%	0	—
Totals	1,336,927	100.00%	5	—

== District 1 ==
2008 Oklahoma's 1st congressional district election
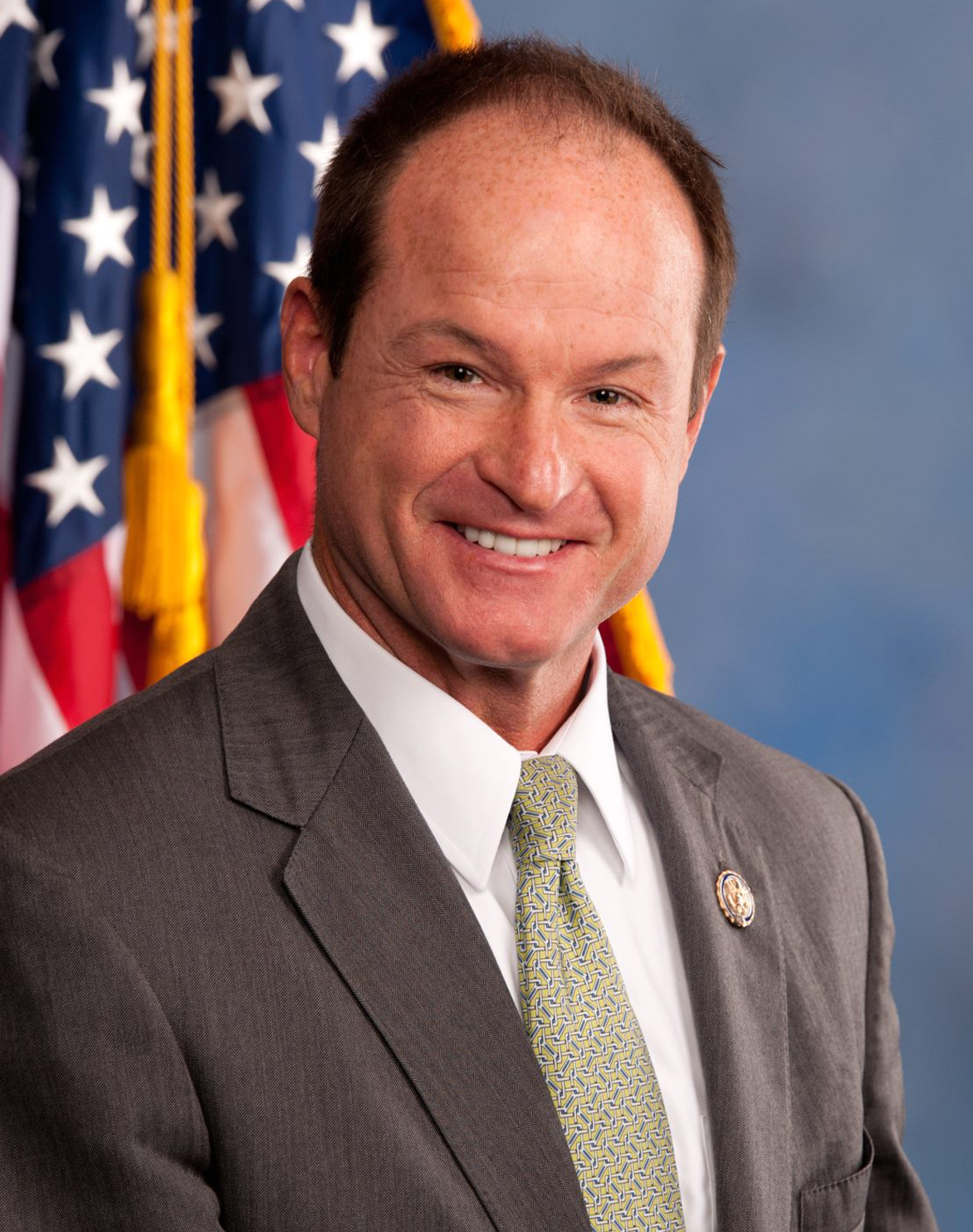

Nominee	John Sullivan	Georgianna Oliver
Party	Republican	Democratic
Popular vote	193,404	98,890
Percentage	66.2%	33.8%
- Precinct and county-level results Sullivan: 50–60% 60–70% 70–80% 80–90% Oliver: 50–60% 60–70% 70–80% 80–90% 90–100%
U.S. Representative before election
John Sullivan
Republican
Elected U.S. Representative
John Sullivan
Republican

The district was focused in the northeastern corner of the state and included the Tulsa metropolitan area as well as all of Tulsa County. It also included Washington County, Wagoner County, and parts of Rogers County and Creek County. It had been represented by Republican John Sullivan since February 2002. The Democratic nominee was Georgianna Oliver, a CEO residing in Tulsa.

=== Predictions ===
Source	Ranking	As of
The Cook Political Report	Likely R	November 6, 2008
Rothenberg	Safe R	November 2, 2008
Sabato's Crystal Ball	Safe R	November 6, 2008
Real Clear Politics	Safe R	November 7, 2008
CQ Politics	Safe R	November 6, 2008

Oklahoma's 1st congressional district election, 2008
Party	Candidate	Votes	%
Republican	John Sullivan (inc.)	193,404	66.17
Democratic	Georgianna Oliver	98,890	33.83
Total votes		292,294	100.00
Republican hold			

== District 2 ==
2008 Oklahoma's 2nd congressional district election
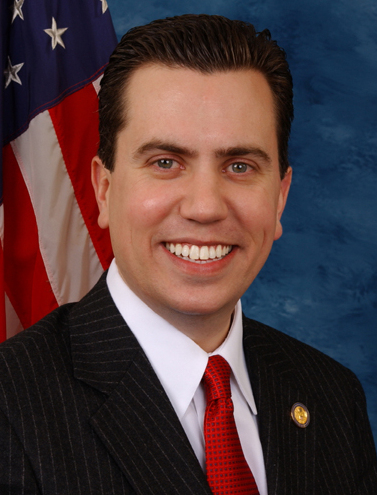

Nominee	Dan Boren	Raymond J. Wickson
Party	Democratic	Republican
Popular vote	173,757	72,815
Percentage	70.47%	29.53%
- Precinct and county-level results Wickson: 50–60% 60–70% Boren: 50–60% 60–70% 70–80% 80–90% 90–100% No votes
U.S. Representative before election
Dan Boren
Democratic
Elected U.S. Representative
Dan Boren
Democratic

This district covers roughly the eastern quarter of the state, and has been represented by Democrat Dan Boren since 2005. His Republican challenger was Raymond Wickson of Okmulgee.

=== Predictions ===
Source	Ranking	As of
The Cook Political Report	Safe D	November 6, 2008
Rothenberg	Safe D	November 2, 2008
Sabato's Crystal Ball	Safe D	November 6, 2008
Real Clear Politics	Safe D	November 7, 2008
CQ Politics	Safe D	November 6, 2008

Oklahoma's 2nd congressional district election, 2008
Party	Candidate	Votes	%
Democratic	Dan Boren (inc.)	173,757	70.47
Republican	Raymond J. Wickson	72,815	29.53
Total votes		246,572	100.00
Democratic hold			

== District 3 ==
2008 Oklahoma's 3rd congressional district election
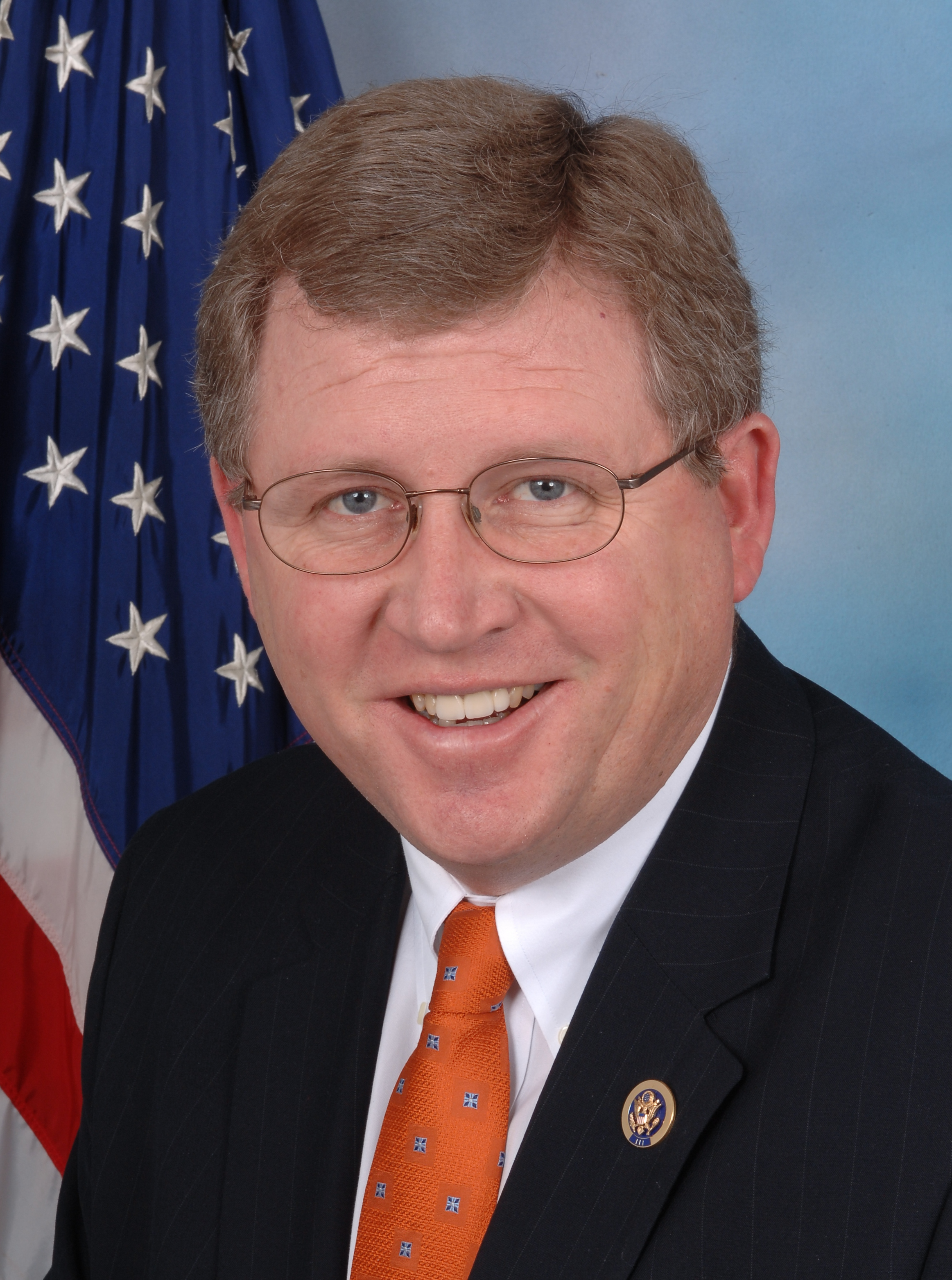

Nominee	Frank Lucas	Frankie Robbins	Forrest Michael
Party	Republican	Democratic	Independent
Popular vote	184,306	62,297	17,756
Percentage	69.7%	23.6%	6.7%
- County results Lucas: 40–50% 50–60% 60–70% 70–80% 80–90%
U.S. Representative before election
Frank Lucas (inc.)
Republican
Elected U.S. Representative
Frank Lucas
Republican

Precinct and county-level results

This district covers the Oklahoma Panhandle and northwest half of the state, including portions of Oklahoma City and Tulsa. It has been represented by Republican Frank Lucas since May 1994. The Democratic nominee was engineer and USDA Forest Service employee Frankie Robbins.

=== Predictions ===
Source	Ranking	As of
The Cook Political Report	Safe R	November 6, 2008
Rothenberg	Safe R	November 2, 2008
Sabato's Crystal Ball	Safe R	November 6, 2008
Real Clear Politics	Safe R	November 7, 2008
CQ Politics	Safe R	November 6, 2008

Oklahoma's 3rd congressional district election, 2008
Party	Candidate	Votes	%
Republican	Frank Lucas (inc.)	184,306	69.72
Democratic	Frankie Robbins	62,297	23.57
Independent	Forrest Michael	17,756	6.72
Total votes		264,359	100.00
Republican hold			

== District 4 ==
2008 Oklahoma's 4th congressional district election
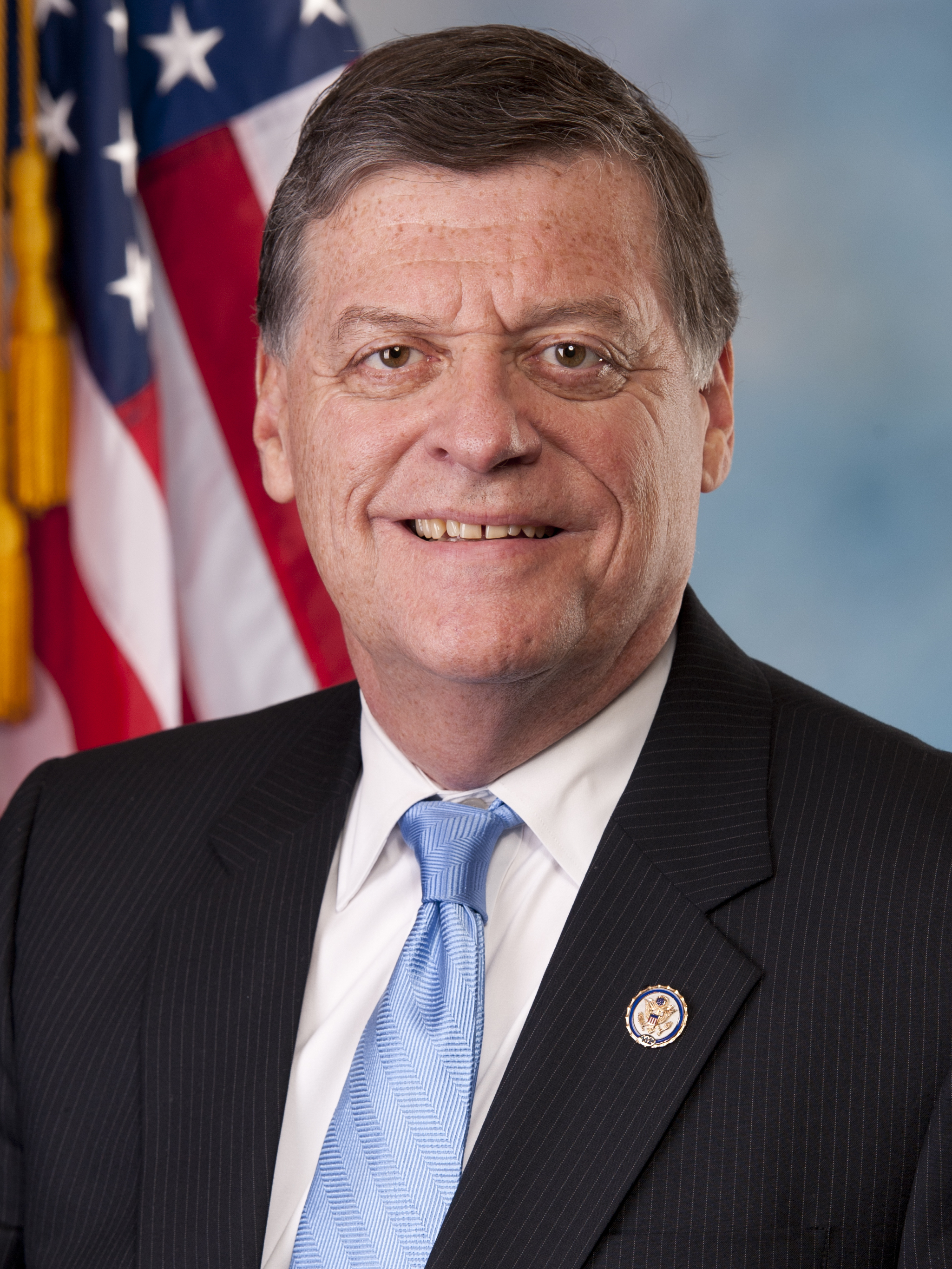

Nominee	Tom Cole	Blake Cummings
Party	Republican	Democratic
Popular vote	180,080	79,764
Percentage	66.0%	29.2%
- County results Cole: 60–70% 70–80%
U.S. Representative before election
Tom Cole (inc.)
Republican
Elected U.S. Representative
Tom Cole
Republican

Precinct and county-level results

This district covers the south-central area, and has been represented by Republican Tom Cole since 2003. The Democratic nominee was oil industry land consultant Blake Cummings.

=== Predictions ===
Source	Ranking	As of
The Cook Political Report	Likely R	November 6, 2008
Rothenberg	Safe R	November 2, 2008
Sabato's Crystal Ball	Safe R	November 6, 2008
Real Clear Politics	Safe R	November 7, 2008
CQ Politics	Safe R	November 6, 2008

Oklahoma's 4th congressional district election, 2008
Party	Candidate	Votes	%
Republican	Tom Cole (inc.)	180,080	65.99
Democratic	Blake Cummings	79,764	29.23
Independent	David E. Joyce	13,027	4.77
Total votes		272,871	100.00
Republican hold			

== District 5 ==
2008 Oklahoma's 5th congressional district election
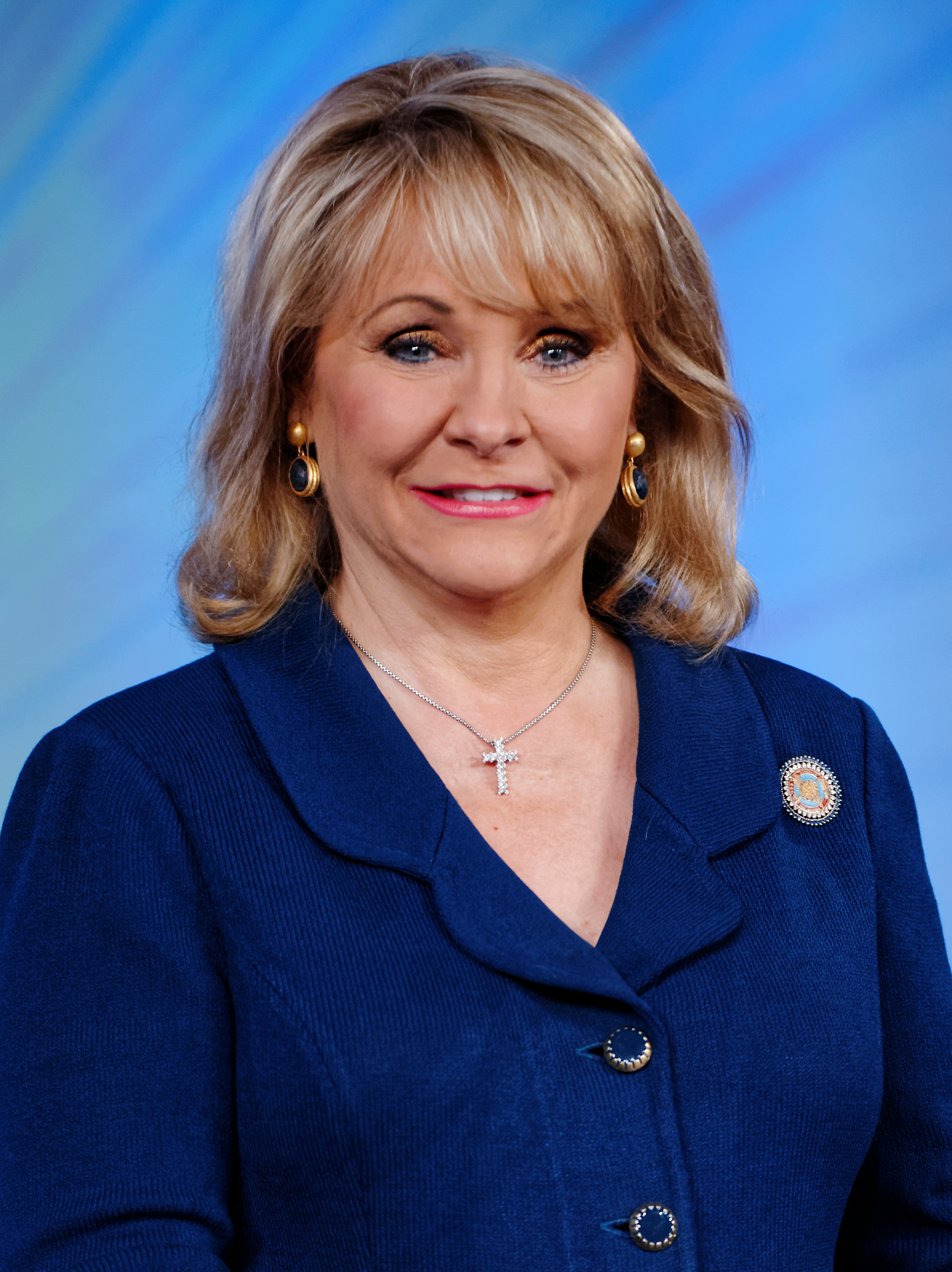

Nominee	Mary Fallin	Steven L. Perry
Party	Republican	Democratic
Popular vote	171,925	88,996
Percentage	65.9%	34.1%
- County results Fallin: 60–70% 70–80%
U.S. Representative before election
Mary Fallin (inc.)
Republican
Elected U.S. Representative
Mary Fallin
Republican

Precinct and county-level results

This district covers the central part of the state and includes Oklahoma City, the state capital. It has been represented by Republican Mary Fallin since 2007. Lawyer and Democratic nominee Steven Perry challenged the freshman incumbent, campaigning on a platform focused on using American and not foreign energy.

=== Predictions ===
Source	Ranking	As of
The Cook Political Report	Safe R	November 6, 2008
Rothenberg	Safe R	November 2, 2008
Sabato's Crystal Ball	Safe R	November 6, 2008
Real Clear Politics	Safe R	November 7, 2008
CQ Politics	Safe R	November 6, 2008

Oklahoma's 5th congressional district election, 2008
Party	Candidate	Votes	%
Republican	Mary Fallin (inc.)	171,925	65.89
Democratic	Steven L. Perry	88,996	34.11
Total votes		260,921	100.00
Republican hold			

Preceded by 2006 elections	2008 United States House of Representatives elections in Oklahoma	Succeeded by 2010 elections
