= Bill Lance =

Chickasaw Nation politician

Secretary of State of the Chickasaw Nation
- Incumbent
- Assumed office May 9, 2022
- Governor: Bill Anoatubby
- Preceded by: Position established

Secretary of Commerce of the Chickasaw Nation
- In office 2009 – May 9, 2022
- Governor: Bill Anoatubby
- Succeeded by: Dan Boren

Personal details
- Citizenship: American; Chickasaw Nation

Bill Lance is a Chickasaw Nation politician who has served as the Chickasaw Nation Secretary of State since 2022. He previously served as the Chickasaw Nation Secretary of Commerce from 2009 to 2022.

== Political career ==
Lance was first appointed as the Chickasaw Nation Secretary of Commerce in 2009 by Governor Bill Anoatubby. In 2018, he was ranked the 29th most powerful Oklahoman by the OKC Friday newspaper; he was ranked 18th in 2022. In 2022, he was named the first Chickasaw Nation Secretary of State. In 2023, he was inducted into the Oklahoma Hall of Fame.
