= Tom Newell (politician) =

American politician (born 1968)

Chief of Staff to the Governor of Oklahoma
- Incumbent
- Assumed office December 2, 2024
- Appointed by: Kevin Stitt
- Preceded by: Grayson Walker

Member of the Oklahoma House of Representatives from the 28th district
- In office November 16, 2010 – December 31, 2016
- Preceded by: Ryan Kiesel
- Succeeded by: Zack Taylor

Personal details
- Born: December 4, 1968 (age 57)

Tom Newell is an American politician who represented the 28th district of the Oklahoma House of Representatives from 2010 to 2016. He is a member of the Republican Party.

== Biography ==
Tom Newell was born on December 4, 1968. He graduated from Mid-America Christian University with a bachelor's of pastoral ministry and received a master of business administration from Liberty University. He worked as a pastor and was elected to the Oklahoma House of Representatives in 2010. He resigned from office on December 31, 2016. In March 2024, he joined the Oklahoma Council of Public Affairs staff. He is a member of the Republican Party. He was appointed Governor Kevin Stitt's chief of staff on December 2, 2024.
