= Ryan Kiesel =

American politician (1980–2025)

Ryan D. Kiesel

Member of the Oklahoma House of Representatives from the 28th district
- In office 2004–2010
- Preceded by: Dan Boren
- Succeeded by: Tom Newell

Personal details
- Born: January 15, 1980 Oklahoma City, Oklahoma, U.S.
- Died: January 31, 2025 (aged 45)
- Party: Democratic Party
- Children: 2
- Education: University of Oklahoma, University of Oklahoma College of Law

Ryan Dean Kiesel (January 15, 1980 – January 31, 2025) was an American civil rights attorney and politician who represented the 28th district of the Oklahoma House of Representatives from 2004 to 2010. A member of the Democratic Party, he later served as the executive director of the American Civil Liberties Union of Oklahoma from August 2011 to June 2020.

== Early life and education ==
Kiesel was born in Oklahoma City on January 15, 1980. He was raised in Seminole, Oklahoma and graduated from Seminole High School in 1998. He received a bachelor's degree in political science from the University of Oklahoma. While in college, he worked on Bill Nations' campaign and during the 2000 Democratic presidential primary he worked for Bill Bradley. In 2006 he earned his Juris Doctor degree from the University of Oklahoma College of Law. Kiesel was married and had two children. He worked in the Oklahoma State Senate for senator Enoch Kelly Haney.

== Career ==
The Oklahoman described Kiesel's as being a "liberal Democrat" and "outspoken progressive" throughout his career.

=== Oklahoma House ===
Kiesel won election to the Oklahoma House of Representatives from District 28 in 2004, while he was still a law student. He won reelection in 2006 and 2008. He did not run for reelection in 2010. In the legislature he supported net neutrality, abortion rights, and health insurance reform. He authored two bills passed into law. In 2005, his bill defining phenylketonuria was signed into law by Governor Brad Henry. In 2010, a bill requiring the ownership of social media accounts to be part of deceased person's estate was also signed into law by Henry. In 2006, he supported a bill to rename Oklahoma State Highway 62 in honor of W. R. Shraver, a Black U.S. Marshal killed in 1905.

=== Post-legislative career and death ===
After leaving the state house, Kiesel joined the American Civil Liberties Union of Oklahoma as their executive director on August 30, 2011. He also worked as an adjunct professor at the University of Oklahoma School of Law. During his tenure he campaigned for Oklahoma State Question 780, a criminal justice reform measure, and he also lobbied for criminal justice reform to the Oklahoma Legislature. He left the ACLU in June 2020, and entered private practice and lobbied for medical marijuana groups. In 2023, he supported State Question 820. He was also a regular guest on KOSU's This Week in Oklahoma Politics hosted by Michael Cross for 12 years.

He died on January 31, 2025, at the age of 45 from cancer.
