= 2002 United States House of Representatives elections in Oklahoma =

- November 5, 2002

All 5 Oklahoma seats to the United States House of Representatives
	Majority party	Minority party	Third party
Party	Republican	Democratic	Independent
Last election	5	1	0
Seats won	4	1	0
Seat change	▼1	Steady	Steady
Popular vote	546,832	391,927	63,093
Percentage	54.58%	39.12%	6.30%
Swing	▼9.95%	▲8.14%

Republican
40–50%
50–60%
60–70%
70–80%
80–90%
>90%
Democratic
50–60%
60–70%
70–80%
80–90%

The 2002 House elections in Oklahoma occurred on November 5, 2002 to elect the members of the State of Oklahoma's delegation to the United States House of Representatives. Oklahoma had five seats in the House, apportioned according to the 2000 United States census.

These elections were held concurrently with the United States Senate elections of 2002 (including one in Oklahoma), the United States House elections in other states, and various state and local elections.

== Overview ==
United States House of Representatives elections in Oklahoma, 2002
Party	Votes	Percentage	Seats before	Seats after	+/–
Republican	546,832	54.58	5	4	-1
Democratic	391,927	39.12	1	1	±0
Independent	63,093	6.3	0	0	0
Totals	1,001,852	100.00%	6	5	-1
Voter turnout					

== Results ==
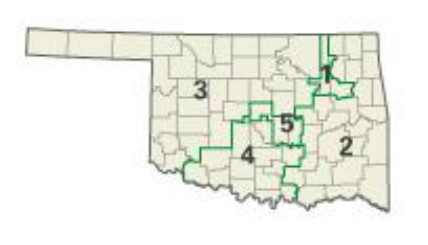
Oklahoma congressional districts in the 2002 elections

District	Incumbent	Party	First elected	Result	Candidates
Oklahoma 1	John Sullivan	Republican	2002	Re-elected	John Sullivan (R) 55.62% Doug Dodd (D) 42.17% Joe Cristiano (I) 2.21%
Oklahoma 2	Brad Carson	Democratic	2000	Re-elected	Brad Carson (D) 74.12% Kent Pharaoh (R) 25.88%
Oklahoma 3	Wes Watkins	Republican	1976	Retired; Republican loss	Frank Lucas (R) 75.58% Robert T. Murphy (D) 24.42%
Oklahoma 3	Frank Lucas; Redistricted from the 6th district (now obsolete)	Republican	1994	Re-elected	Frank Lucas (R) 75.58% Robert T. Murphy (D) 24.42%
Oklahoma 4	J. C. Watts	Republican	1994	Retired; Republican hold	Tom Cole (R) 53.83% Darryl Roberts (D) 46.17%
Oklahoma 5	Ernest Istook	Republican	1992	Re-elected	Ernest Istook (R) 62.23% Lou Barlow (D) 32.41% Donna C. Davis (I) 5.37%

== Gallery ==
Precinct and county-level results for OK‑01

Precinct and county-level results for OK‑02

Precinct and county-level results for OK‑03

Precinct and county-level results for OK‑04

Precinct and county-level results for OK‑05

== District 1 ==
2002 Oklahoma's 1st congressional district election
- November 5, 2002
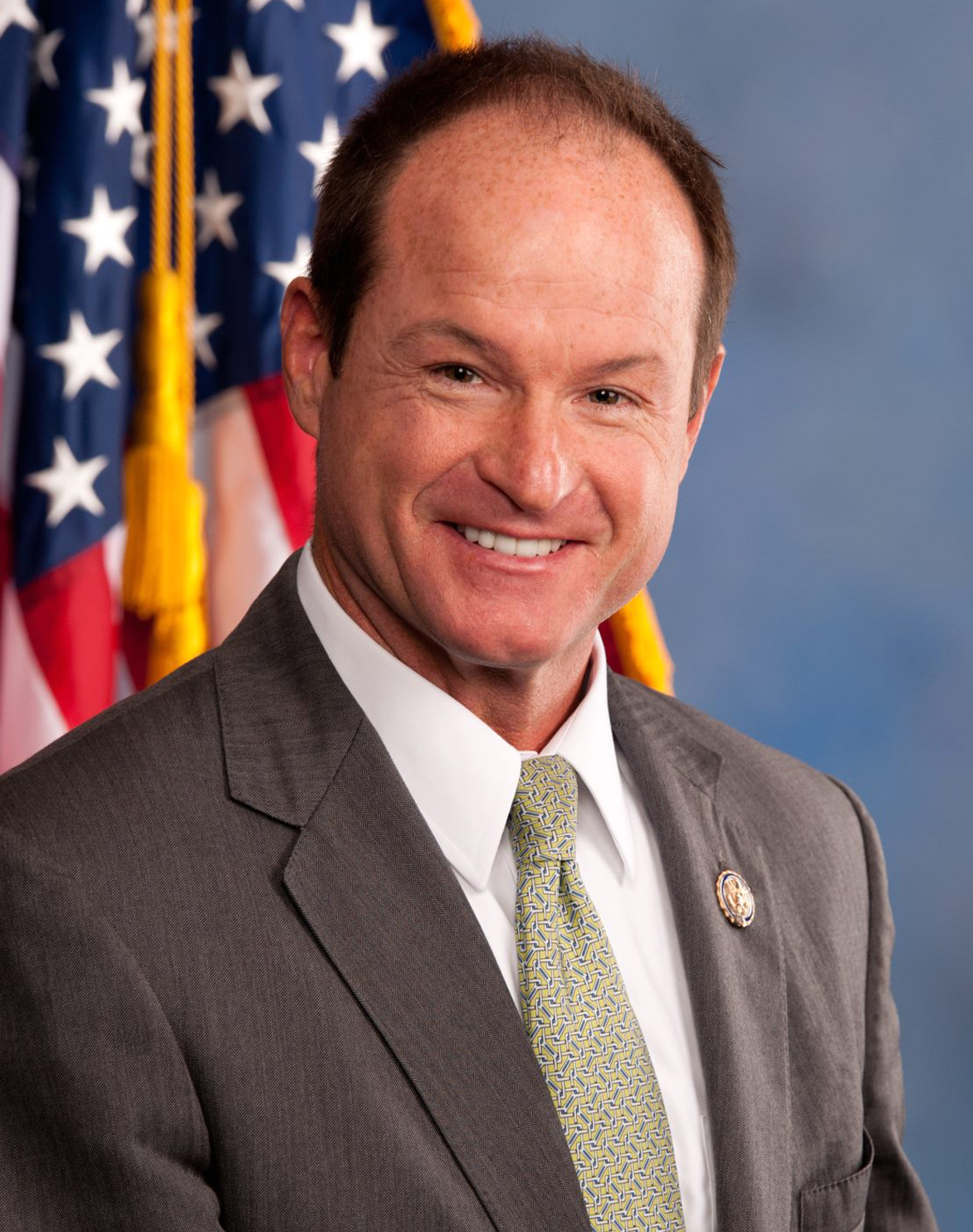

Nominee	John Sullivan	Doug Dodd
Party	Republican	Democratic
Popular vote	119,566	90,649
Percentage	55.6%	42.2%
U.S. Representative before election
John Sullivan
Republican
Elected U.S. Representative
John Sullivan
Republican

Incumbent Republican John Sullivan, who was first elected in 2002, ran for re-election. Sullivan was re-elected with 55.6% of the vote.

=== General election ===
==== Results ====
Oklahoma's 1st congressional district election, 2002
Party	Candidate	Votes	%
Republican	John Sullivan (incumbent)	119,566	55.6
Democratic	Doug Dodd	90,649	42.2
Independent	Joe Cristiano	4,740	2.2
Total votes		214,955	100.0
Republican hold			

== District 2 ==
2002 Oklahoma's 2nd congressional district election
- November 5, 2002
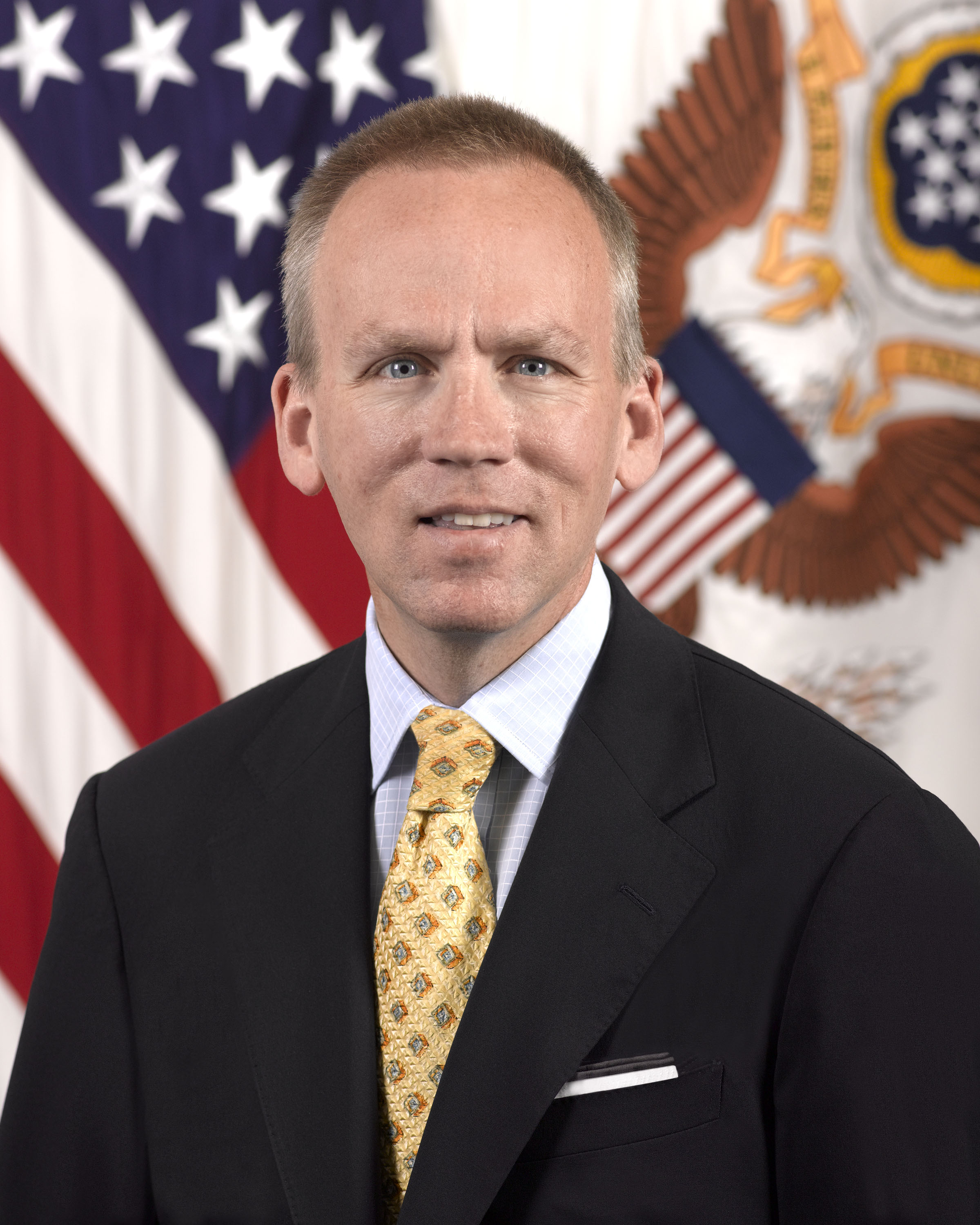

Nominee	Brad Carson	Kent Pharaoh
Party	Democratic	Republican
Popular vote	146,748	51,234
Percentage	74.1%	25.9%
U.S. Representative before election
Brad Carson
Democratic
Elected U.S. Representative
Brad Carson
Democratic

Incumbent Democrat Brad Carson, who was first elected in 2000, ran for re-election. Carson was re-elected with 74.1% of the vote.

=== General election ===
==== Results ====
Oklahoma's 2nd congressional district election, 2002
Party	Candidate	Votes	%
Democratic	Brad Carson (incumbent)	146,748	74.1
Republican	Kent Pharaoh	51,234	25.9
Total votes		197,982	100.0
Democratic hold			

== District 3 ==
2002 Oklahoma's 3rd congressional district election
- November 5, 2002
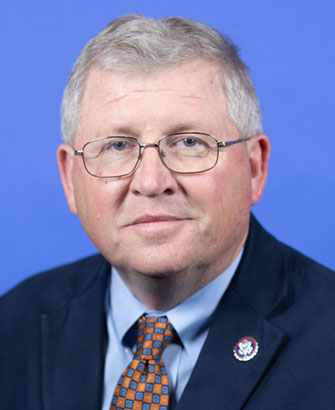

Nominee	Frank Lucas	Robert T. Murphy
Party	Republican	Independent
Popular vote	148,206	47,884
Percentage	75.6%	24.4%
U.S. Representative before election
Wes Watkins
Republican
Elected U.S. Representative
Frank Lucas
Republican

Frank Lucas won the election with 75.6% of the vote.

=== General election ===
==== Results ====
Oklahoma's 3rd congressional district election, 2002
Party	Candidate	Votes	%
Republican	Frank Lucas	148,206	75.6
Independent	Robert T. Murphy	47,884	24.4
Total votes		196,090	100.0
Republican hold			

== District 4 ==
2002 Oklahoma's 4th congressional district election
- November 5, 2002
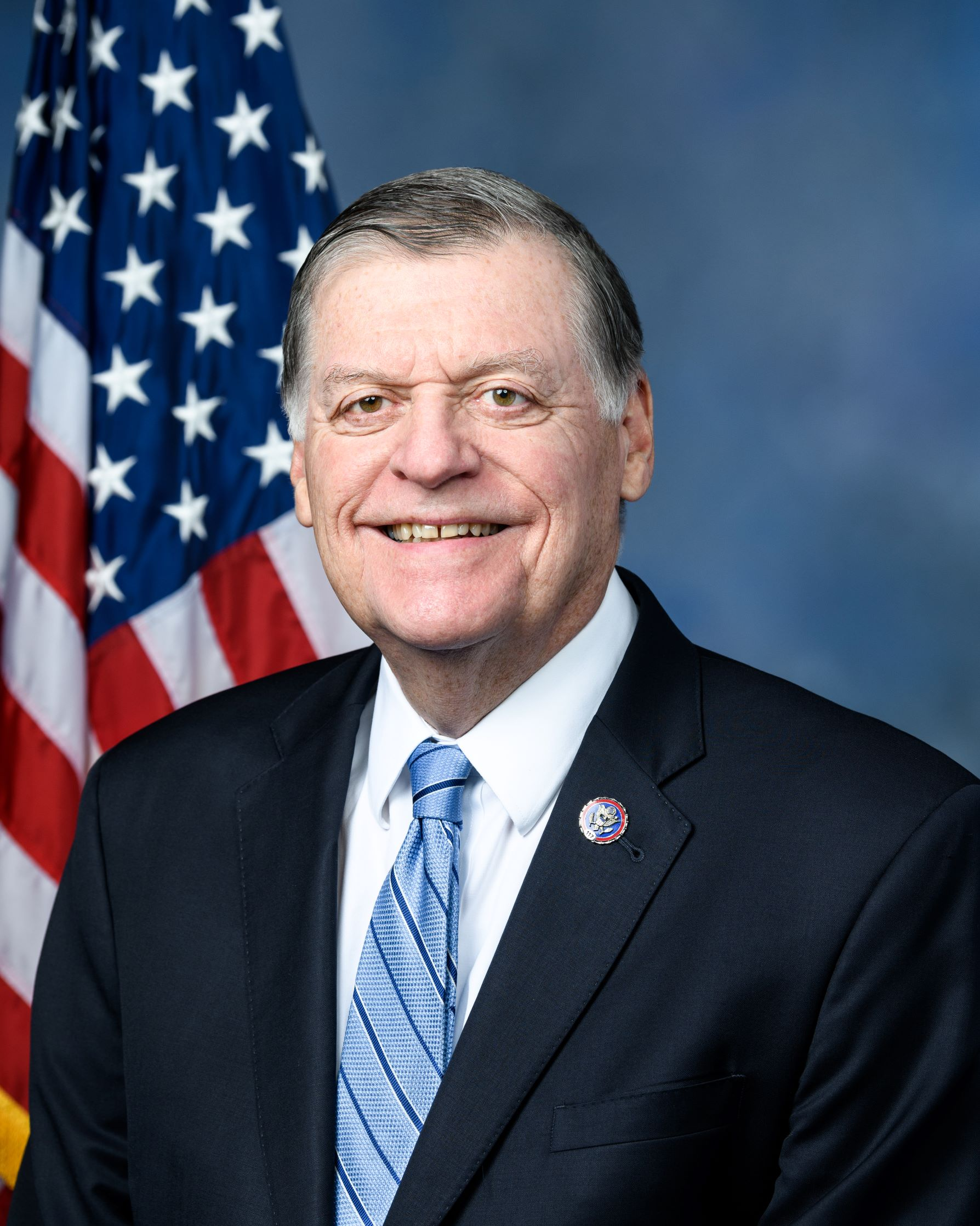

Nominee	Tom Cole	Darryl Roberts
Party	Republican	Democratic
Popular vote	106,452	91,322
Percentage	53.8%	46.2%
U.S. Representative before election
J. C. Watts
Republican
Elected U.S. Representative
Tom Cole
Republican

Incumbent Republican J. C. Watts, who was first elected in 1994, retired. Tom Cole won the open seat with 53.8% of the vote.

=== General election ===
==== Results ====
Oklahoma's 4th congressional district election, 2002
Party	Candidate	Votes	%
Republican	Tom Cole	106,452	53.8
Democratic	Darryl Roberts	91,322	46.2
Total votes		197,774	100.0
Republican hold			

== District 5 ==
2002 Oklahoma's 5th congressional district election
- November 5, 2002
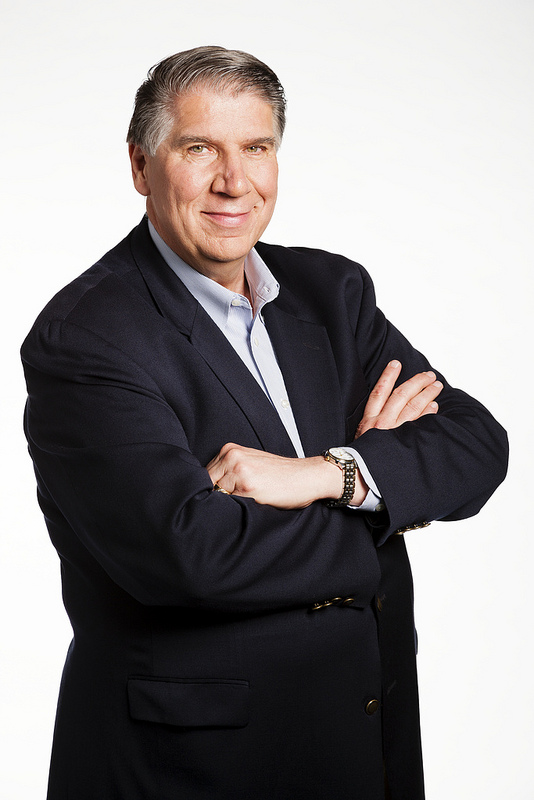

Nominee	Ernest Istook	Lou Barlow
Party	Republican	Democratic
Popular vote	121,374	63,208
Percentage	62.2%	32.4%
U.S. Representative before election
Ernest Istook
Republican
Elected U.S. Representative
Ernest Istook
Republican

Incumbent Republican Ernest Istook, who was first elected in 1992, ran for re-election. Istook was re-elected with 62.2% of the vote.

=== General election ===
==== Results ====
Oklahoma's 5th congressional district election, 2002
Party	Candidate	Votes	%
Republican	Ernest Istook (incumbent)	121,374	62.2
Democratic	Lou Barlow	63,208	32.4
Independent	Donna C. Davis	10,469	5.4
Total votes		195,051	100.0
Republican hold			
