= John Sullivan (Oklahoma politician) =

American politician (born 1965)

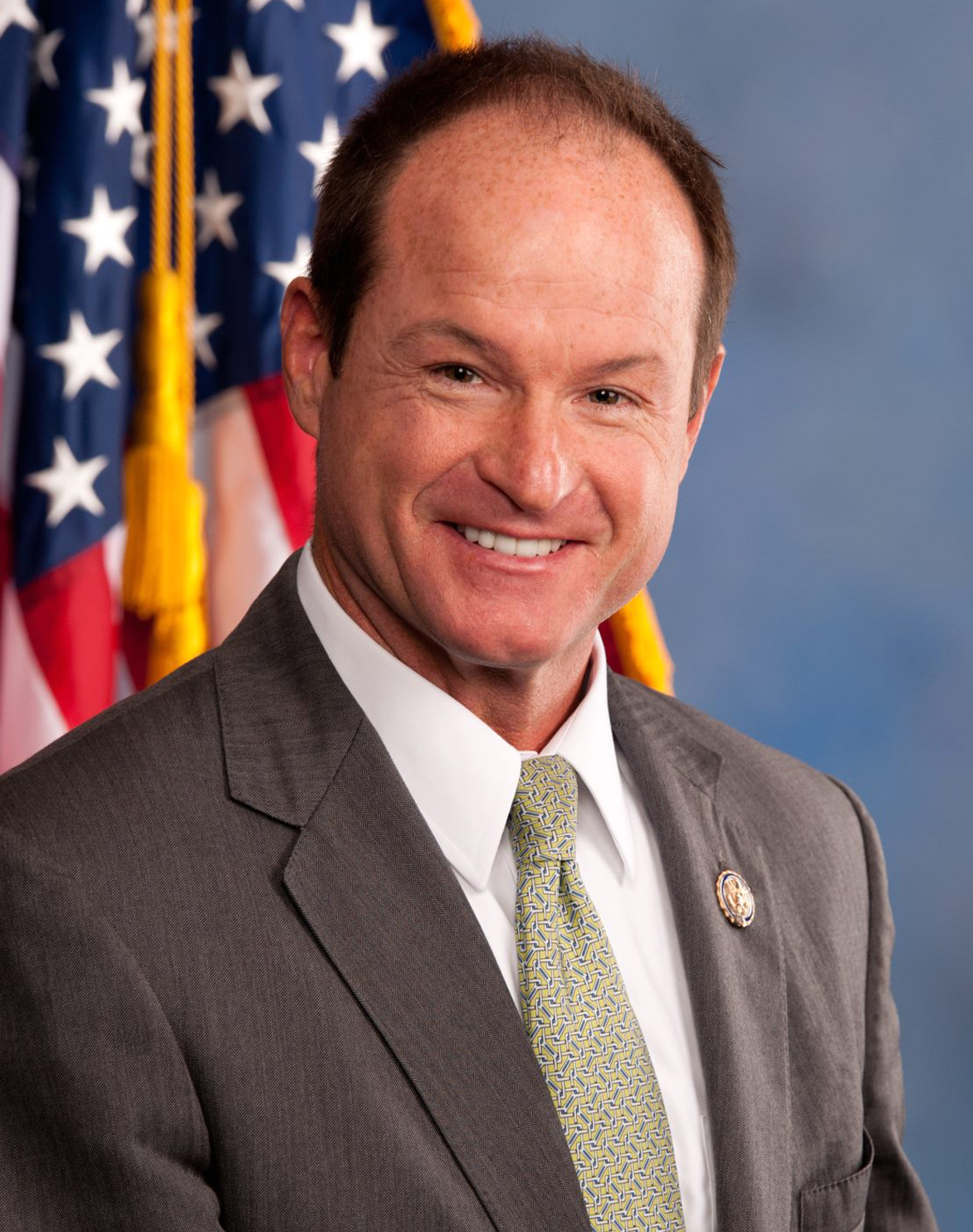

Member of the U.S. House of Representatives from Oklahoma's 1st district
- In office February 15, 2002 – January 3, 2013 (Note: Sullivan's official service begins on the effective date after the special election, while he was not sworn in until February 27, 2002.)
- Preceded by: Steve Largent
- Succeeded by: Jim Bridenstine

Member of the Oklahoma House of Representatives from the 71st district
- In office January 1995 – February 15, 2002
- Preceded by: Rob Johnson
- Succeeded by: Chad Stites

Personal details
- Born: John Alfred Sullivan; January 1, 1965 (age 61) Oklahoma City, Oklahoma, U.S.
- Party: Republican
- Spouse: Judy Sullivan
- Education: Northeastern State University (BBA)

John Alfred Sullivan (born January 1, 1965) is an American politician who was the U.S. representative for Oklahoma's 1st congressional district (based in the Tulsa area) from 2002 to 2013. He is a member of the Republican Party.

Sullivan was initially elected in 2002. On June 26, 2012, Sullivan lost renomination to political newcomer Jim Bridenstine in what was considered a major upset.

== Early life, education, and early career ==
Sullivan was born in Oklahoma City and graduated from Bishop Kelley High School in Tulsa. He subsequently entered Northeastern State University, where he received a B.B.A. in marketing, in 1992. Prior to holding elected office, Sullivan worked in the private sector for Love Travel Centers as a regional sales manager and for BAMA Transportation as a fleet manager.

Sullivan was a Republican member of the Oklahoma House of Representatives from 1995 to 2002, where he served as minority whip.

== U.S. House of Representatives ==
=== Elections ===
In 2002, incumbent Steve Largent resigned from Congress to focus on his campaign for Governor. Sullivan ran in the ensuing special election, and was originally a long-shot candidate against First Lady Cathy Keating. However, after Sullivan placed first in the primary over Keating by a wide margin, she withdrew from the runoff election, and Sullivan became the Republican nominee. In the general election, Sullivan defeated Doug Dodd, the Democratic nominee, by a wide margin, winning 54–44 percent. He won a full term in the regular election in November 2002.

=== Tenure ===
During the 2004 election campaign, Sullivan's police record became public. Local media concluded he had at least three arrests: for assault and battery of an off-duty police officer in 1982, when he was 17 years old, and for public intoxication and disturbing the peace in 1985, while still under-age. The most recent arrest, at age 27, was due to an outstanding bench warrant issued after he failed to appear in court for a traffic violation.

Sullivan voted to make the PATRIOT Act permanent, without any future option for Congressional review or revocation.

In the 110th Congress, he served as an Assistant Minority Whip under House Minority Whip Roy Blunt. He held the same position in both the 111th and 112th Congresses under Republican Whip Kevin McCarthy.

On October 3, 2008, Sullivan was one of two Oklahoma Republican congressmen to vote for the Emergency Economic Stabilization Act of 2008 which created the Troubled Assets Relief Program. On December 9, 2008, Sullivan voted against a bailout of the automobile industry saying "taxpayers should not be asked to reward failure by subsidizing the very business practices that got them into this situation in the first place". He also was a proponent of the 2009 Tea Party protests which condemned any bailouts, and also spoke at a rally in Tulsa.

On December 16, 2010, House Energy and Commerce Committee Chairman Fred Upton (R-MI) named Sullivan as the vice chairman of the Subcommittee on Energy and Power.

In December 2011, Sullivan was named a co-chairman of the National Republican Congressional Committee's most significant fundraising effort of the 2012 election cycle, the annual March dinner. The dinner was viewed as a tremendous success, drawing in a record-breaking $12 million for republican Congressional candidates across the country. NRCC Chairman Pete Sessions of Texas praised Sullivan and the other co-chairman saying they did "a phenomenal job in their efforts to make this years event a huge success".

Sullivan was tapped to serve on the House Energy and Commerce Leadership team for the 112th Congress. He was the primary sponsor of H.R. 1380, the New Alternative Transportation to Give America Solutions (NAT GAS) Act of 2011, legislation designed to decrease U.S. dependence on foreign oil by encouraging more natural gas powered vehicles on American roads.

He introduced legislation to study the cumulative economic impact of twelve significant EPA regulations which was passed by the House Energy and Power Subcommittee on May 24, 2011. In February 2011, Sullivan offered an amendment to block the EPA's decision to sell a higher blend, E15, ethanol gasoline for late model cars which passed by a vote of 285–136. Sullivan also sponsored the Transparency in Regulatory Analysis of Impacts on the Nation (TRAIN) Act of 2011 (H.R. 2401), "to require analyses of the cumulative and incremental impacts of certain rules and actions of the Environmental Protection Agency, and for other purposes", which has passed the House and will go on to the Senate.

On February 22, 2012, at a town hall meeting in Bixby, Sullivan said shooting senators would be the only way to pass the Ryan Budget: "You know but other than me going over there with a gun and holding it to their head and maybe killing a couple of them." The next day he released an apology through his spokesperson.

On June 26, 2012, Sullivan was upset in the Republican primary by Jim Bridenstine.

According to the American Conservative Union, Sullivan was consistently among the most conservative members of Congress. He received a 100% rating from the organization in 2009 and 2010 earning their "Defender of Liberty" award both years. He is opposed to all legalized abortion, believes that life begins at conception, and opposes stem cell research on embryonic cells. He has been rated 100% by the Christian Coalition for his views. He is opposed to gun control and has been endorsed by the NRA Political Victory Fund for his position.

He supported a constitutional amendment to ban flag burning and wishes to strip the independent judiciary of the ability to decide any question pertaining to the interpretation of the Pledge of Allegiance. He had been rated as 0% by the ACLU on civil rights issues. He also supported continued U.S. military involvement in Iraq and opposed any "rapid troop pullout".

=== Committee assignments ===
- Committee on Energy and Commerce
  - Subcommittee on Energy and Power (Vice Chair)
  - Subcommittee on Environment and Economy
  - Subcommittee on Oversight and Investigations (Vice Chair – Energy and Power)

== Personal life ==
He and his wife, Judy Beck, have four children.

=== Alcoholism ===
On May 28, 2009, Sullivan entered the Betty Ford Center in California to receive treatment for his addiction to alcohol.

== Electoral history ==
Oklahoma's 1st congressional district: Results 2000–2010
Year	Republican	Votes	Pct	Democratic	Votes	Pct	3rd Party	Party	Votes	Pct	
2002 (special)	John Sullivan	61,694	54%	Doug Dodd	50,850	44%	Neil Mavis	Independent	1,758	2%	*
2002	John Sullivan	119,566	56%	Doug Dodd	90,649	42%	Joe Cristiano	Independent	4,740	2%	
2004	John Sullivan	187,145	60%	Doug Dodd	116,731	38%	John Krymski	Independent	7,058	2%	
2006	John Sullivan	116,920	64%	Alan Gentges	56,724	31%	Bill Wortman	Independent	10,085	5%	
2008	John Sullivan	193,361	66%	Georgianna Oliver	98,863	34%					
2010	John Sullivan	151,173	77%	no candidate			Angelia O'Dell	Independent	45,656	23%	

U.S. House of Representatives
Preceded by Steve Largent	Member of the U.S. House of Representatives from Oklahoma's 1st congressional district 2002–2013	Succeeded by Jim Bridenstine
U.S. order of precedence (ceremonial)
Preceded by Chris Stewart as Former U.S. Representative	Order of precedence of the United States as Former U.S. Representative	Succeeded by Heather Wilson as Former U.S. Representative
