= 2010 United States House of Representatives elections in Oklahoma =

- November 2, 2010

All 5 Oklahoma seats to the United States House of Representatives
	Majority party	Minority party	Third party
Party	Republican	Democratic	Independent
Last election	4	1	0
Seats won	4	1	0
Seat change	Steady	Steady	Steady
Popular vote	519,562	221,966	51,451
Percentage	65.5%	28.0%	6.48%
Swing	▲5.47%	▼9.67%	▲4.18%

Republican
50–60%
60–70%
70–80%
80–90%
90–100%
Democratic
50–60%
60–70%

The 2010 congressional elections in Oklahoma were held on November 2, 2010, to determine who would represent the state of Oklahoma in the United States House of Representatives. Oklahoma has five seats in the House, apportioned according to the 2000 United States census. This election was the final one held in which congressional districts apportioned according to the 2000 U.S. census data. Representatives are elected for two-year terms; those elected serve in the 112th Congress from January 3, 2011, until January 3, 2013.

== Overview ==
2010 United States House of Representatives elections in Oklahoma
Party	Votes	Percentage	Seats before	Seats after	+/–
Republican	519,562	65.5%	4	4	0
Democratic	221,966	28.0%	1	1	0
Independent	51,451	6.48%	0	0	0
Totals	792,979	100.00%	5	5	—

=== By district ===
Results of the 2010 United States House of Representatives elections in Oklahoma by district:

District	Republican		Democratic		Others		Total		Result
District	Votes	%	Votes	%	Votes	%	Votes	%	Result
District 1	151,173	76.80%	0	0.00%	45,656	23.20%	196,829	100.00%	Republican hold
District 2	83,226	43.48%	108,203	56.52%	0	0.00%	191,429	100.00%	Democratic hold
District 3	161,927	77.99%	45,689	22.01%	0	0.00%	207,616	100.00%	Republican hold
District 4	–	–	–	–	–	–	–	–	Republican hold
District 5	123,236	62.52%	68,074	34.54%	5,795	2.94%	197,105	100.00%	Republican hold
Total	519,562	65.52%	221,966	27.99%	51,451	6.49%	792,979	100.00%	

== District 1 ==
2010 Oklahoma's 1st congressional district election
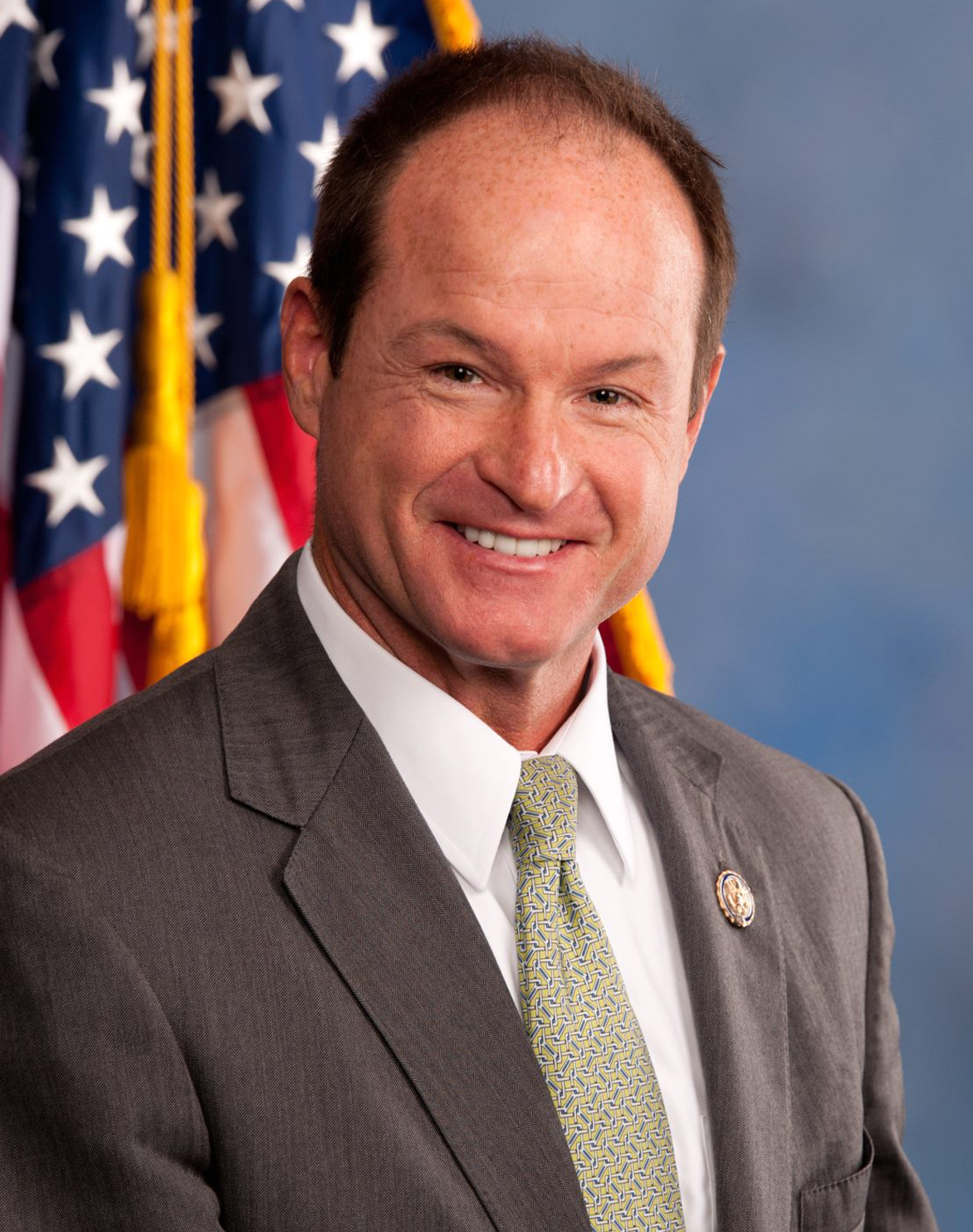

Nominee	John Sullivan	Angelia O'Dell
Party	Republican	Independent
Popular vote	151,173	45,656
Percentage	76.8%	23.2%
- Precinct- and county-level results
U.S. Representative before election
John Sullivan
Republican
Elected U.S. Representative
John Sullivan
Republican

This district was represented by Republican John Sullivan. Republican candidates Craig Allen, Nathan Dahm, Fran Moghaddam, Kenneth Rice, Patrick K. Haworth and Independent Angelia O'Dell all have filed to run against Sullivan. Sullivan entered the Betty Ford Center in California to receive treatment for his addiction to alcohol on May 28, 2009.

=== Democratic primary ===
==== Candidates ====
- None announced

=== Republican primary ===
==== Candidates ====
- John Sullivan, incumbent
- Kenneth Rice
- Nathan Dahm, former missionary
- Patrick Haworth
- Craig Allen
- Fran Moghaddam

=== Results ===
Republican primary results
Party	Candidate	Votes	%
Republican	John Sullivan	38,670	62.07%
Republican	Kenneth Rice	10,394	16.68%
Republican	Nathan Dahm	8,871	14.24%
Republican	Partrick K. Haworth	1,736	2.79%
Republican	Craig Allen	1,420	2.28%
Republican	Fran Moghaddam	1,213	1.95%
Total votes		62,304	100%

=== Predictions ===
Source	Ranking	As of
The Cook Political Report	Safe R	November 1, 2010
Rothenberg	Safe R	November 1, 2010
Sabato's Crystal Ball	Safe R	November 1, 2010
RCP	Safe R	November 1, 2010
CQ Politics	Safe R	October 28, 2010
New York Times	Safe R	November 1, 2010
FiveThirtyEight	Safe R	November 1, 2010

2010 Oklahoma's 1st congressional district House election
Party	Candidate	Votes	%
Republican	John Sullivan (incumbent)	151,173	76.80%
Independent	Angelia O'Dell	45,656	23.20%
Total votes		196,829	100%
Republican hold			

== District 2 ==
2010 Oklahoma's 2nd congressional district election
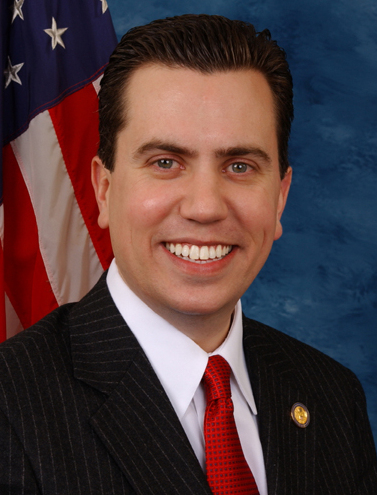

Nominee	Dan Boren	Charles Thompson
Party	Democratic	Republican
Popular vote	108,203	83,226
Percentage	56.5%	43.5%
- Precinct- and county-level results Thompson: 50–60% 60–70% 70–80% Boren: 50–60% 60–70% 70–80% 80–90% 90–100% Tie
U.S. Representative before election
Dan Boren
Democratic
Elected U.S. Representative
Dan Boren
Democratic

This district was represented by Democrat Dan Boren. Democrat Jim Wilson and Republicans Daniel Edmonds, Charles Thompson, Chester Clem Falling, Daniel Arnett, Howard Houchen, and Raymond Wickson all filed to run against Boren.

=== Polling ===
Despite the poor approval ratings of Obama, of whom 27% in this district approve, and the high unpopularity of the Democratic healthcare bills, which were supported by 17% of second district residents, conservative Democrat Boren remains popular.

Boren vs. Edmonds

Poll source	Dates administered	Dan Boren (D)	Daniel Edmonds (R)
Public Policy Polling (Link)	March 3, 2010	44%	28%

Boren vs. Thompson

Poll source	Dates administered	Dan Boren (D)	Charles Thompson (R)
Public Policy Polling (Link)	March 3, 2010	45%	25%

Boren vs. Houchen

Poll source	Dates administered	Dan Boren (D)	Howard Houchen (R)
Public Policy Polling (Link)	March 3, 2010	48%	26%

Boren vs. Arnett

Poll source	Dates administered	Dan Boren (D)	Dan Arnett (R)
Public Policy Polling (Link)	March 3, 2010	49%	22%

=== Democratic primary ===
==== Candidates ====
- Dan Boren, of Muskogee, incumbent
- Jim Wilson, of Tahlequah, state senator

=== Results ===
Democratic primary results
Party	Candidate	Votes	%
Democratic	Dan Boren (incumbent)	66,219	75.5%
Democratic	Jim Wilson	21,543	24.5%
Total votes		87,762	100%

=== Republican primary ===
==== Candidates ====
- Daniel Arnett, Henryetta
- Daniel Edmonds, of Morris
- Chester Clem Falling
- Howard Houchen, of Hugo
- Charles Thompson, of Hulbert
- Raymond Wickson

=== Results ===
There was a runoff election between Daniel Edmonds and Charles Thompson on August 24. Charles Thompson was chosen to run against Dan Boren in November.

Republican primary results
Party	Candidate	Votes	%
Republican	Charles Thompson	8,124	33.7%
Republican	Daniel Edmonds	6,825	28.3%
Republican	Daniel Arnett	3,838	15.8%
Republican	Howard Houchen	2,759	11.4%
Republican	Chester Falling	1,498	6.2%
Republican	Raymond Wickson	1,095	4.5%
Total votes		24,139	100%

Republican primary runoff results
Party	Candidate	Votes	%
Republican	Charles Thompson	7,489	67.3%
Republican	Daniel Edmonds	3,644	32.7%
Total votes		11,142	100%

=== Predictions ===
Source	Ranking	As of
The Cook Political Report	Safe D	November 1, 2010
Rothenberg	Safe D	November 1, 2010
Sabato's Crystal Ball	Safe D	November 1, 2010
RCP	Likely D	November 1, 2010
CQ Politics	Safe D	October 28, 2010
New York Times	Safe D	November 1, 2010
FiveThirtyEight	Safe D	November 1, 2010

2010 Oklahoma's 2nd congressional district House election
Party	Candidate	Votes	%
Democratic	Dan Boren (incumbent)	108,203	56.52%
Republican	Charles Thompson	83,226	43.48%
Total votes		191,429	100%
Democratic hold			

== District 3 ==
2010 Oklahoma's 3rd congressional district election
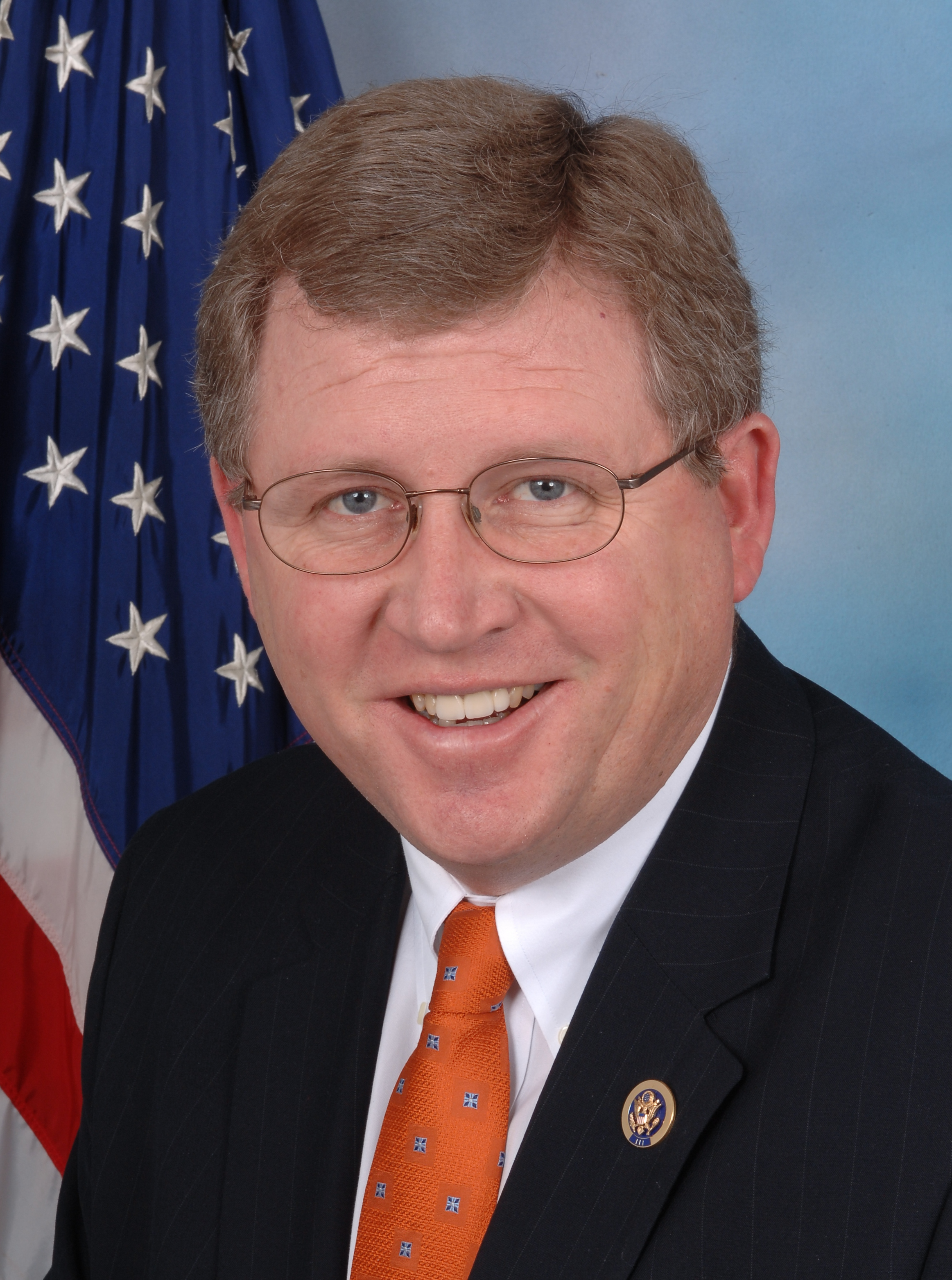

Nominee	Frank Lucas	Frankie Robbins
Party	Republican	Democratic
Popular vote	161,927	45,689
Percentage	78.0%	22.0%
- Precinct- and county-level results Lucas: 50–60% 60–70% 70–80% 80–90% 90–100% Robbins: 50–60% 60–70% 70–80% 80–90% 90–100%
U.S. Representative before election
Frank Lucas
Republican
Elected U.S. Representative
Frank Lucas
Republican

This district was represented by Republican Frank Lucas. Democrat, Frankie Robbins, has filed to run for this office against Lucas. There will be no primary election for district 3

=== Predictions ===
Source	Ranking	As of
The Cook Political Report	Safe R	November 1, 2010
Rothenberg	Safe R	November 1, 2010
Sabato's Crystal Ball	Safe R	November 1, 2010
RCP	Safe R	November 1, 2010
CQ Politics	Safe R	October 28, 2010
New York Times	Safe R	November 1, 2010
FiveThirtyEight	Safe R	November 1, 2010

2010 Oklahoma's 3rd congressional districts House election
Party	Candidate	Votes	%
Republican	Frank Lucas (incumbent)	161,927	77.99%
Democratic	Frankie Robbins	45,689	22.01%
Total votes		207,616	100%
Republican hold			

== District 4 ==
2010 Oklahoma's 4th congressional district election
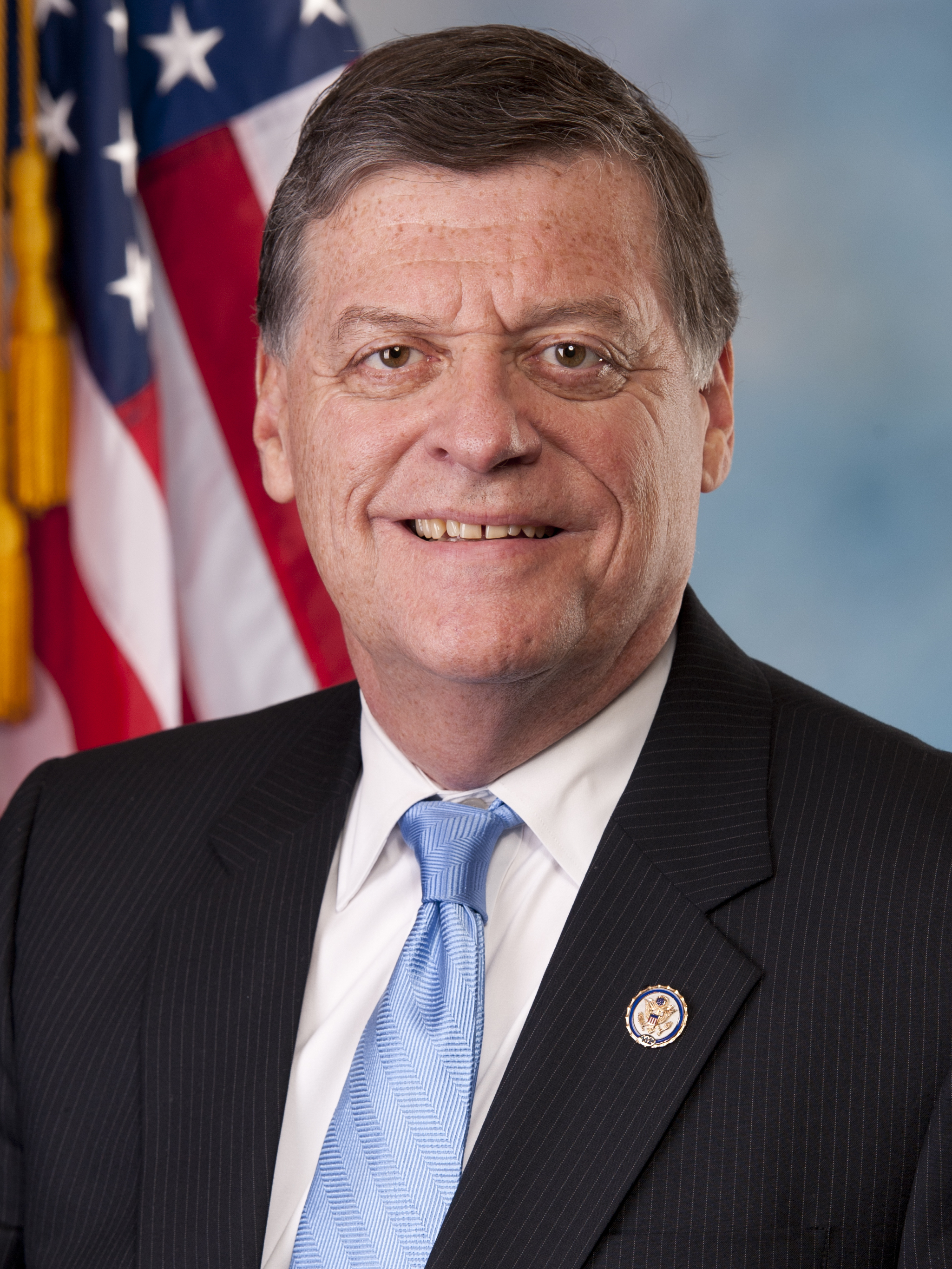
Nominee	Tom Cole
Party	Republican
Popular vote
Percentage	100.0%
U.S. Representative before election
Tom Cole
Republican
Elected U.S. Representative
Tom Cole
Republican

This district was represented by Republican Tom Cole. Republican R. J. Harris, ran for this seat against Cole., no Democrats contested this district.

=== Results ===
Republican primary results
Party	Candidate	Votes	%
Republican	Tom Cole (incumbent)	32,584	77.3%
Republican	R. J. Harris	9,592	22.7%
Total votes		42,176	100

=== Predictions ===
Source	Ranking	As of
The Cook Political Report	Safe R	November 1, 2010
Rothenberg	Safe R	November 1, 2010
Sabato's Crystal Ball	Safe R	November 1, 2010
RCP	Safe R	November 1, 2010
CQ Politics	Safe R	October 28, 2010
New York Times	Safe R	November 1, 2010
FiveThirtyEight	Safe R	November 1, 2010

2010 Oklahoma's 4th congressional district House election
Party	Candidate	Votes	%
Republican	Tom Cole (incumbent)		100%
Total votes			100%
Republican hold			

== District 5 ==
2010 Oklahoma's 5th congressional district election
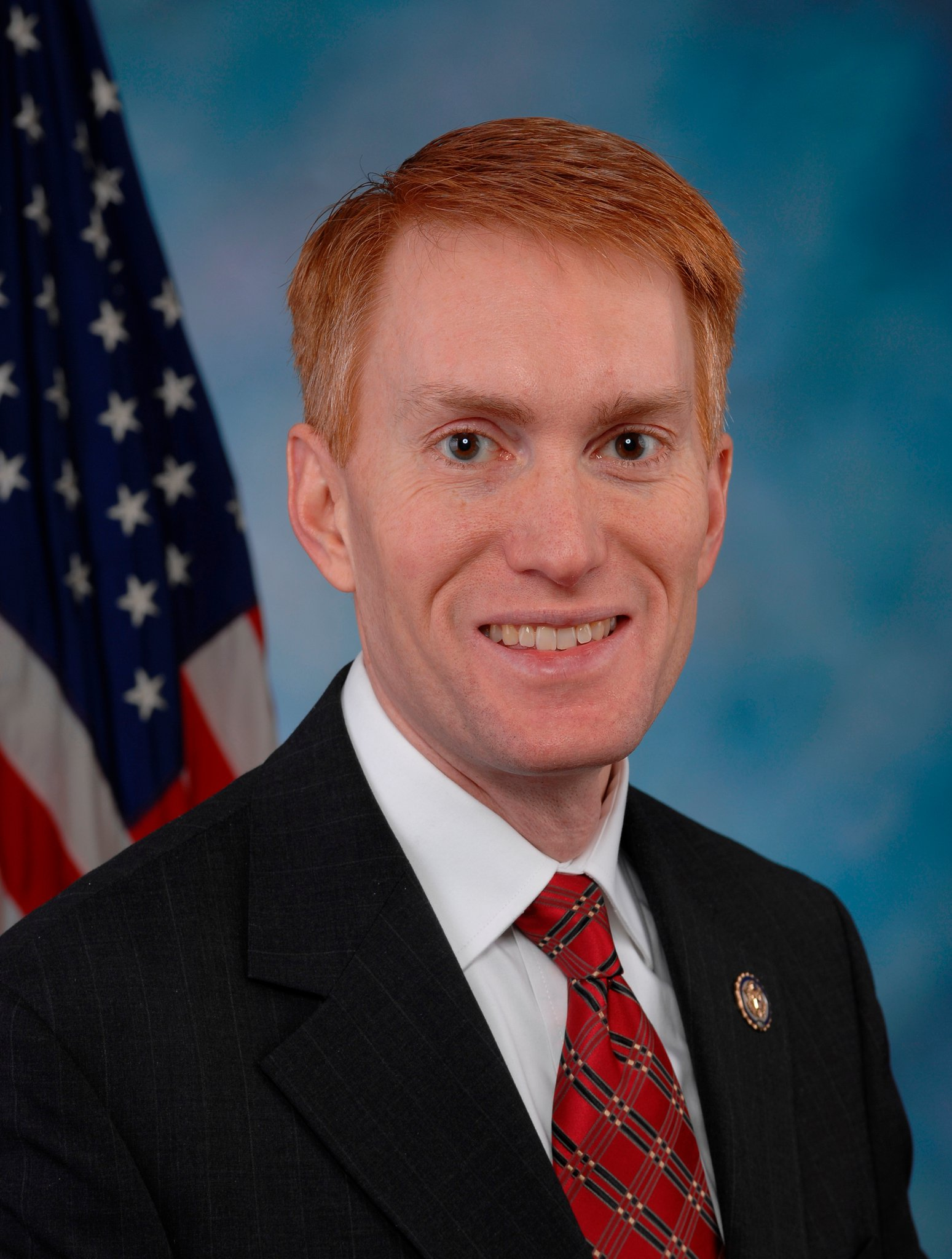

Nominee	James Lankford	Billy Coyle
Party	Republican	Democratic
Popular vote	123,236	68,074
Percentage	62.5%	34.5%
- Precinct- and county-level results Lankford: 40–50% 50–60% 60–70% 70–80% 80–90% 90–100% Coyle: 40–50% 50–60% 60–70% 70–80% 80–90% 90–100% No votes
U.S. Representative before election
Mary Fallin
Republican
Elected U.S. Representative
James Lankford
Republican

This district was represented by Republican Mary Fallin, but the seat was opened as she has announced her candidacy for Governor of Oklahoma. The seat attracted the attention of several Republican candidates, including State Representative Mike Thompson, former State Representative Kevin Calvey, whom Fallin defeated in the 2006 Republican primary for this seat, physician Johnny Roy, who also ran in 2006, Harry Johnson, Rick Flanigan, Shane Jett and Baptist General Convention of Oklahoma employee James Lankford, as well as Democrats Tom Guild and Billy Coyle. Ultimately Republican James Lankford and Democrat Billy Coyle won their respective parties' nominations and faced off in the general election in November.

This district includes most of Oklahoma City as well as Pottawatomie and Seminole counties.

=== Democratic primary ===
==== Candidates ====
- Billy Coyle, of Oklahoma City
- Tom Guild, of Edmond

==== Results ====
Democratic primary results
Party	Candidate	Votes	%
Democratic	Billy Coyle	21,139	56.8%
Democratic	Tom Guild	16,059	43.2%
Total votes		37,198	100%

=== Republican primary ===
==== Candidates ====
- James Lankford, program director of Falls Creek
- Kevin Calvey, former state representative
- Mike Thompson, former state representative
- Harry Johnson
- Rick Flanigan
- Johnny Roy
- Shane Jett, state representative

==== Polling ====
First-choice polling

Poll source	Date(s) administered	Sample size (Note: Key: A – all adults RV – registered voters LV – likely voters V – unclear)	Margin of error	Kevin Calvey	Rick Flanigan	James Lankford	Johnny Roy	Mike Thompson	Harry Johnson	Shane Jett	Undecided
Soonerpoll	July 7–9, 2010	306 (LV)	5.6%	28%	<1%	20%	2%	14%	1%	6%	29%
Soonerpoll	February 25-March 8, 2010	302 (LV)	5.64%	20%	1%	7%	1%	9%			63%

Second-choice polling

Poll source	Date(s) administered	Sample size	Margin of error	Kevin Calvey	Rick Flanigan	James Lankford	Johnny Roy	Mike Thompson	Harry Johnson	Shane Jett	Undecided
Soonerpoll	July 7–9, 2010	306 (LV)	5.6%	20%	0%	14%	5%	11%	<1%	12%	38%

==== Results ====
There was a runoff election held on August 24 between James Lankford and Kevin Calvey. Lankford was chosen to run against Billy Coyle in November.

Republican primary results
Party	Candidate	Votes	%
Republican	James Lankford	18,755	33.6%
Republican	Kevin Calvey	18,143	32.5%
Republican	Mike Thompson	10,007	17.9%
Republican	Shane Jett	5,955	10.7%
Republican	Johnny Roy	1,548	2.8%
Republican	Rick Flanigan	762	1.4%
Republican	Harry Johnson	686	1.2%
Total votes		55,856	100%

Republican primary runoff results
Party	Candidate	Votes	%
Republican	James Lankford	29,814	65.2%
Republican	Kevin Calvey	15,899	32.7%
Total votes		45,713	100%

=== Predictions ===
Source	Ranking	As of
The Cook Political Report	Safe R	November 1, 2010
Rothenberg	Safe R	November 1, 2010
Sabato's Crystal Ball	Safe R	November 1, 2010
RCP	Safe R	November 1, 2010
CQ Politics	Safe R	October 28, 2010
New York Times	Safe R	November 1, 2010
FiveThirtyEight	Safe R	November 1, 2010

2010 Oklahoma' 5th congressional district House election
Party	Candidate	Votes	%
Republican	James Lankford	123,236	62.53%
Democratic	Billy Coyle	68,074	34.53%
Independent	Clark Duffe	3,067	1.56%
Independent	Dave White	2,728	1.38%
Total votes		197,105	100%
Republican hold			

== See also ==
- 2010 United States Senate election in Oklahoma
- 2010 Oklahoma gubernatorial election
