= Dan Boren =

American politician (born 1973)

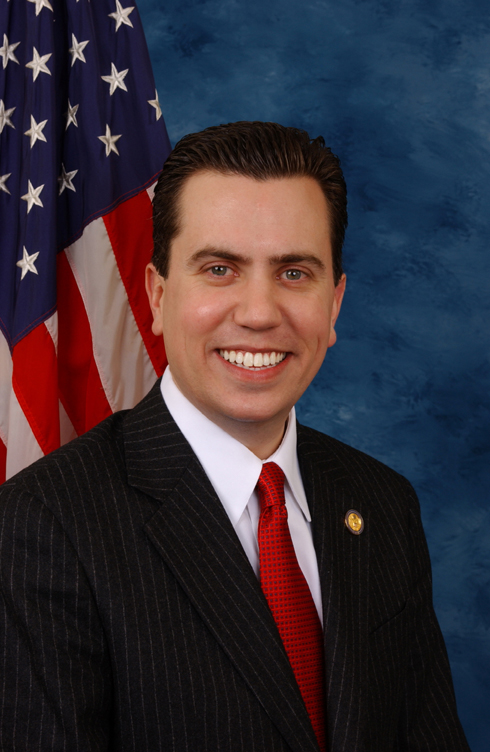

Member of the U.S. House of Representatives from Oklahoma's 2nd district
- In office January 3, 2005 – January 3, 2013
- Preceded by: Brad Carson
- Succeeded by: Markwayne Mullin

Member of the Oklahoma House of Representatives from the 28th district
- In office November 2002 – November 2004
- Preceded by: Mike Ervin
- Succeeded by: Ryan Kiesel

Personal details
- Born: David Daniel Boren; August 2, 1973 (age 53) Shawnee, Oklahoma, U.S.
- Party: Democratic
- Spouse: Andrea Heupel (m. 2005)
- Parents: David Boren (father); Janna Lou Little Boren (mother)
- Relatives: Lyle Boren (grandfather); Josh Heupel (brother-in-law)
- Education: Texas Christian University (BS); University of Oklahoma (MBA)

David Daniel Boren (born August 2, 1973) is an American businessman and retired politician who serves as the secretary of commerce for the Chickasaw Nation. Prior to this, he served as the U.S. representative for Oklahoma's 2nd congressional district from 2005 to 2013. The district included most of the eastern part of the state outside of Tulsa. He is a member of the Democratic Party. He also served as a state representative in the 28th district of the Oklahoma House of Representatives.

Boren announced on June 7, 2011, that he would not seek re-election to the House in 2012. On June 19, 2012, he announced via a news release that he has been hired as President of Corporate Development for the Chickasaw Nation, working to promote economic diversification upon completion of his term in Congress. In January 2020, Boren began his role as president and Chief Banking Officer of First United Bank, but returned to the Chickasaw Nation as Secretary of Commerce on May 9, 2022, succeeding Bill Lance. In June 2022, he was appointed to First United Bank's board of directors.

== Early life, family, education and career ==
Boren was born in Shawnee, Oklahoma, the son of Janna Lou (née Little) and state representative David Boren.

His father would go on to serve as Governor of Oklahoma, as a U.S. Senator, and as president of the University of Oklahoma. His paternal grandfather, Lyle Boren, served in the U.S. House of Representatives, representing southeastern Oklahoma (Oklahoma's 4th congressional district) from 1937 to 1947. His maternal grandfather, Reuel Little helped found the American Party to support the 1968 presidential campaign of George Wallace. His first cousin, Janna Little Ryan, is married to former Speaker of the United States House of Representatives Paul Ryan (R-WI), who was nominated for vice president at the 2012 Republican National Convention to be the running mate of Mitt Romney.

Boren was a page in the US Senate in 1989. In 1997, he received a B.S. from Texas Christian University (TCU) in Fort Worth. He obtained an MBA from the University of Oklahoma in 2001. He was a member of Kappa Sigma fraternity.

At the start of his career, Boren served on the staff of Congressman Wes Watkins, worked as an education administrator and bank teller, and was a member of the staff of the Oklahoma Corporation Commission for Denise Bode.

== Oklahoma House of Representatives (2002–2004) ==
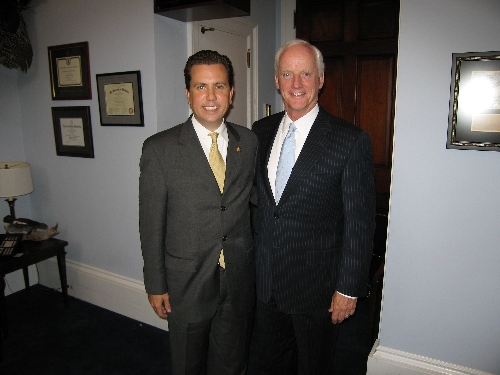
Dan Boren with former governor Frank Keating

Boren served in the Oklahoma House of Representatives from 2002 to 2004, representing the 28th House District. He served as Vice Chair of the Appropriations Subcommittee on Public Safety and Judiciary. He also served on the Transportation Committee, Wildlife Committee, Appropriations and Budget Committee and the Energy Committee. He was a member of the National Conference of State Legislatures (NCSL).

== U.S. House of Representatives (2005–2013) ==
=== Committee assignments ===
Boren, as of the 111th Congress, was a member of the following committees:

- Committee on Armed Services
  - Subcommittee on Readiness
  - Subcommittee on Air and Land Forces
- Committee on Natural Resources
  - Subcommittee on Energy and Mineral Resources
  - Subcommittee on National Parks, Forests and Public Lands
  - Subcommittee on Indian, Insular and Alaska Native Affairs (Ranking Member)
- Permanent Select Committee on Intelligence
  - Subcommittee on Terrorism/HUMINT, Analysis and Counterintelligence
  - Subcommittee on Oversight and Investigations
- Committee on Financial Services
  - Subcommittee on Consumer Protection and Financial Institutions

Boren served as co-chair and Whip for the Blue Dog Coalition and co-chair of the Congressional Sportsmen's Caucus.

On May 15, 2008, Boren was elected to the board of directors of the National Rifle Association (NRA). Boren said that he was a lifetime member of the NRA.

In November 2009, Boren voted along with 39 other Democrats against the Affordable Health Care for America Act. Boren also voted against the final bill, in March. He said "only 17 percent of my constituents supported the bill." In January 2011, Boren was one of 3 Democrats to vote with the unified Republican caucus for its repeal.

Boren, along with Walter Jones, R-N.C., led the U.S. House military depot caucus in 2011. The group of House members focuses on policy issues affecting military facilities including aviation depots, shipyards, arsenals, ammunition plants and energetic material production facilities.

=== Military issues ===
On July 10, 2007, Boren was one of ten Democrats to vote against a bill to withdraw troops by April 1, 2008. Later that month, he announced his opposition to the 2007 Iraq troop surge.

In January 2009, along with all other members of the Oklahoma congressional delegation, Boren said he opposed President Obama's decision to close the Guantanamo Bay detention camp.

=== Legislation ===
Dan Boren was a sponsor of several pieces of legislation including HR 1676 (110th): Native American Home Ownership Opportunity Act of 2007, HR 4544 (110th): Code Talkers Recognition Act of 2008. HR 4154 (112th): SAVE Native Women Act, HR 2550 (112th): Spouses of Fallen Heroes Scholarship Act, HR 2444 (112th): Department of the Interior Tribal Self-Governance Act of 2011 and HR 1330 (111th Congress): Colorectal Cancer Screening and Detection Coverage Act of 2009.

== Retirement ==
On June 7, 2011, The Oklahoman announced that "Rep. Dan Boren, the only Democrat in Oklahoma's seven-person congressional delegation, will not seek re-election in 2012, setting up what could be an intense partisan battle for a seat that spans much of eastern Oklahoma."

On June 12, 2012, Boren announced that following his final term in office, he would join the Chickasaw Nation as the President of Corporate Development. He later became the President and Chief Banking Officer for First United Bank in the state of Oklahoma.

On May 9, 2022, Boren was appointed as Secretary of Commerce for the Chickasaw Nation by Governor Bill Anoatuby as the replacement for Bill Lance former Secretary of Commerce who was appointed to be Chickasaw Secretary of State

== Business career ==
After leaving Congress in 2013, Boren began work as President of Corporate Development for the Chickasaw Nation. He held this position until December 2019, when he was named Chief Banking Officer and Oklahoma President of First United Bank, one of the largest banking institutions in the Southwest. He returned to the Chickasaw Nation as Secretary of Commerce in May 2022, succeeding Bill Lance. In June 2022, Boren was appointed to First United Bank's board of directors.

== Political campaigns ==
In the 2004 United States House of Representatives elections, Boren ran for Oklahoma's second congressional district to succeed fellow Democrat Brad Carson, who was retiring from the House to run for the United States Senate. He won the primary with 58% of the vote, and then defeated Republican candidate Wayland Smalley in the general election by more than 85,000 votes (66% to 34%) and was inaugurated in the 109th Congress in January 2005. Boren was one of only two politicians endorsed by country music singer Toby Keith, the other being President George W. Bush. Boren was reelected in 2006, 2008 and 2010. In 2010, Boren was challenged in the Democratic primary by State Senator Jim Wilson, who ran as a more liberal candidate, but Boren won with over 75% of the vote. In the general election, he defeated Republican Charles Thompson by a margin of 13%, despite the Republican wave that swept the nation that year.

Boren was known as one of the most conservative Democrats in Congress, but his conservatism fit the political demographics of his district. The 2nd was once a Democratic stronghold, but has become increasingly friendly to Republicans as Tulsa's suburbs have begun to encroach on the district and the rural areas have trended right. The district has voted for the Republican candidate in the 2000, 2004, and 2008 Presidential elections, by double-digit margins in the latter two years. Additionally, the Democrats in the district tend to be more socially and fiscally conservative than their national counterparts.

Boren considered a run for Governor of Oklahoma in 2018 before deciding to stay in his position with the Chickasaw Nation.

== Electoral history ==
2004 Oklahoma's 2nd congressional district election
Party	Candidate	Votes	%
Democratic	Dan Boren	179,579	65.9%
Republican	Wayland Smalley	92,963	34.1%
Total votes		272,542	100.00%
Democratic hold			

2006 Oklahoma's 2nd congressional district election
Party	Candidate	Votes	%
Democratic	Dan Boren (Incumbent)	122,347	72.7%
Republican	Patrick K. Miller	45,861	27.3%
Total votes		168,208	100.00%
Democratic hold			

2008 Oklahoma's 2nd congressional district election
Party	Candidate	Votes	%
Democratic	Dan Boren (Incumbent)	173,757	70.5%
Republican	Raymond J. Wickson	72,815	29.5%
Total votes		246,572	100.00%
Democratic hold			

2010 Oklahoma's 2nd congressional district election
Party	Candidate	Votes	%
Democratic	Dan Boren (Incumbent)	108,203	56.5%
Republican	Charles Thompson	83,226	43.5%
Total votes		191,429	100.00%
Democratic hold			

== Personal life ==
Boren is married to Andrea Heupel, who is the sister of Josh Heupel, the former starting quarterback who led the Oklahoma Sooners to win the 2000 BCS National Championship and later head football coach of the Tennessee Volunteers. Boren and his family live in Oklahoma City with their two children. Boren is a member of the Episcopal Church.

== See also ==
- "30 Something" Working Group

U.S. House of Representatives
Preceded by Brad Carson	Member of the U.S. House of Representatives from Oklahoma's 2nd congressional district 2005–2013	Succeeded by Markwayne Mullin
U.S. order of precedence (ceremonial)
Preceded by J.C. Watts as Former U.S. Representative	Order of precedence of the United States as Former U.S. Representative	Succeeded by Tulsi Gabbard as Former U.S. Representative
