= List of newspapers in Oklahoma =

The List of newspapers in Oklahoma lists every daily and non-daily news publication currently operating in the U.S. state of Oklahoma. The list includes information on where the publication is produced, whether it is distributed daily or non-daily, what its circulation is, and who publishes it. For those newspapers that are also published online, the website is given.

== List of active newspapers ==
Newspaper	Area	Frequency	Circulation	Publisher/Parent Company
The Ada News	Ada	Daily	8,000	CNHI
Allen Advocate	Allen	Non-daily	1,500	Robinson Publishing Company
Altus Times	Altus	Daily	5,000	Hicks Media Group
Alva Review-Courier	Alva	Non-daily	11,300	Martin Broadcasting
The American	Afton	Weekly		Reid Newspapers
Anadarko Daily News	Anadarko	Daily	4,800	McBride Family
Antlers American	Antlers	Non-daily	3,200	Brad House
Apache News	Apache	Non-daily	1,200	Wright Family
The Ardmoreite	Ardmore	Daily	9,800	CherryRoad Media
The Atoka County Times	Atoka	Non-daily	4,200	Louise Cain
Baptist Messenger	Oklahoma City	Non-daily	75,837	Baptist Convention of Oklahoma
Bartlesville Examiner-Enterprise	Bartlesville	Daily	12,000	GateHouse Media
Beaver Herald Democrat	Beaver	Non-daily	1,750	Lansden Family
Bethany Tribune	Bethany	Non-daily	3,500	Reid Newspapers
Bishinik	Durant	Non-daily	192,576	Choctaw Nation
The Black Chronicle	Oklahoma City	Non-daily	33,000	Perry Publishing and Broadcasting
Blackwell Journal Tribune	Blackwell	Weekly	2,800	Bruce Jones
Blanchard News	Blanchard	Non-daily	3,000	
Boise City News	Boise City	Non-daily	1,650	
Bristow News and Record Citizen	Bristow	Non-daily	3,300	Carolyn Ashford
Broken Bow News	Broken Bow	Non-daily	5,500	McCurtain County Gazette
Bryan County Star	Durant	Non-daily	700	Plyler Publishing
Buffalo Weekly News	Buffalo	Weekly	1,000	Williams Media, LLC
Canton Times	Canton	Non-daily	1,000	Mack Miller
The Capitol Hill Beacon	Oklahoma City	Non-daily	changed name	David Sellers
Carnegie Herald	Carnegie	Non-daily	1,700	Lori Cooper
Chelsea Reporter	Chelsea	Non-daily	1,835	Linda Lord
Cherokee Advocate	Tahlequah	Non-daily	90,000	Cherokee Nation
Cherokee Messenger and Republican	Cherokee	Non-daily	2,250	Steve Booher
Cherokee Phoenix	Cherokee Nation	Monthly		Cherokee Nation
Cheyenne Star	Cheyenne	Non-daily	2,100	Melanie Cole
Chickasaw Times	Ada	Non-daily	25,000	Chickasaw Nation
Chickasha Express Star	Chickasha	Daily	4,600	CNHI
Choctaw Times	Choctaw	Non-daily	2,400	Choctaw Times LLC
The Christian Chronicle	Churches of Christ	Monthly		Oklahoma Christian University
Chronicles of Grand Lake	Langley	Non-daily	15,000	Brian Ruth
City Sentinel	Oklahoma City	Non-daily	74,851	Cory G Charlston & Richard J Grellner: Charlston-Grellner Media LLC - A Westfall-Gooden Single-Family Office partnership
Claremore Daily Progress	Claremore	Daily	6,700	CNHI
Clayton Today	Clayton	Non-daily	1,200	TriCounty Publishing
Cleveland American	Cleveland	Non-daily	3,000	Ferguson and Ferguson
Cleveland County Chronicle	Noble	Non-daily	2,500	Monty Collins
Clinton Daily News	Clinton	Daily	4,500	Rod Serfoss
Coalgate Record Register	Coalgate	Non-daily	2,300	Robinson Publishing Company
Collinsville News	Collinsville	Weekly	1,600	Community Publishers Inc.
The Comanche Nation News	Lawton	Non-daily	7,000	Stigler Publishing
The Comanche Times	Comanche	Weekly	600	Todd Brooks
Cordell Beacon	Cordell	Non-daily	4,700	Brett Wesner
County Times	Lawton	Non-daily	1,500	Tommy Hawthorne
Country Connection	Eakly	Non-daily	1,800	
Coweta American	Coweta	Weekly	3,000	Community Publishers Inc.
Cushing Citizen	Cushing	Non-daily	3,300	Cimarron Valley Communications, LLC
Cyril News	Cyril	Non-daily	1,300	Sonya Gilliam
Daily O'Collegian	OSU-Stillwater	Daily	11,000	Oklahoma State University - Stillwater
The Davis News	Davis	Non-daily	1,800	
Delaware County Journal	Jay	Non-daily	3,100	Reid Newspapers
Delaware Indian News	Bartlesville	Non-daily	5,000	
Dewey County Publisher	Seiling	Non-daily	1,300	Mack Miller
Drumright Gusher	Drumright	Non-daily	1,500	
Duncan Banner	Duncan	Daily	10,000	CNHI
Durant Daily Democrat	Durant	Daily	4,500	Civitas Media
Eastern Oklahoma Catholic	Tulsa	Non-daily		Diocese of Tulsa
Eastern Times Register	Vian	Non-daily	1,500	Jeff Mayo
Edmond Life & Leisure	Edmond	Non-daily	14,500	Ray Hibbard Jr.
Elk City Daily News	Elk City	Daily	4,500	Larry Wade
Ellis County Capital	Arnett	Non-daily	1,300	Jerry Denson
El Nacional	Oklahoma City	Non-daily	11,000	Rosa Quiroga King
El Reno Tribune	El Reno	Non-daily	5,000	Dyer Publishing
The Enid News & Eagle	Enid	Daily	15,603	CNHI
Eufaula Indian Journal	Eufaula	Non-daily	3,600	Darrell Sumner
Fairfax Chief	Fairfax	Non-daily	1,600	Ida Roberts
Fairland American	Fairland	Non-daily	1,200	John Linx
Fairview Republican	Fairview	Non-daily	3,000	Hoby Hammer
Fletcher Herald	Fletcher	Non-daily	1,000	Lynn Moon
Fort Cobb Journal	Fort Cobb	Non-daily	150	
Fort Gibson Times	Muskogee	Non-daily	1,300	CNHI
Fort Sill Cannoneer	Fort Sill	Non-daily	14,541	U.S. Army
Frederick Leader	Frederick	Non-daily	1,200	Civitas Media
Frederick Press	Frederick	Non-daily	1,300	Ray Wallace
Freedom Call	Freedom	Non-daily	290	Islia Barnes
Gage Record	Gage	Non-daily	400	Jerry Denson
Garber-Billings News	Garber	Non-daily	800	Vicki Hogan
Garvin County News Star	Maysville	Non-daily	2,100	Jeff Shultz
Geary Star	Geary	Non-daily	1,200	
Grove Sun	Grove	Non-daily	5,300	Reid Newspapers
Guthrie News Leader	Guthrie	Daily	3,500	Belinda Ramsey
Guymon Daily Herald	Guymon	Daily	2,800	Horizon Publishing
Haskell News	Haskell	Non-daily	1,350	Mark Anderson
Healdton Herald	Healdton	Non-daily	2,400	Cindy Dickerson
Heavener Ledger	Heavener	Non-daily	4,000	Jim Johnson
Hennessey Clipper	Hennessey	Non-daily	1,600	Barbara Walter
Henryetta Free-Lance	Henryetta	Non-daily	2,600	Sumner Newspapers
Hinton Record	Hinton	Non-daily	875	Tim Curtin
Hobart Democrat Chief	Hobart	Non-daily	3,200	W.J. Hancock
Holdenville News	Holdenville	Daily	2,200	Eastern Oklahoma Publishers
Holdenville Tribune	Holdenville	Non-daily	1,000	Robinson Publishing Company
Hollis News	Hollis	Non-daily	1,800	Chris Blackburn
Hominy News Progress	Hominy	Non-daily	1,500	Ferguson & Ferguson
Hooker Advance	Hooker	Non-daily	1,200	Sheila Blankenship
Hownikan	Shawnee	Non-daily	15,250	Citizen Potawatomi Nation
Hugo Daily News	Hugo	Daily	3,000	Stan Stamper
Hughes County Times	Wetumka	Non-daily	2,500	Robinson Publishing Company
Inola Independent	Inola	Non-daily	1,500	Johnny Brock
Johnson County Capital Democrat	Tishomingo	Non-daily	3,250	Ray Lokey
The Journal Record	Oklahoma City	Daily	3,200	Bridgetower Media
Kingfisher Times and Free Press	Kingfisher	Non-daily	3,800	Reid Publishing
Kiowa County Democrat	Snyder	Non-daily	1,350	Carol Middick
Konawa Leader	Konawa	Non-daily	2,000	Stu Phillips
Latimer County News Tribune	Wilburton	Non-daily	2,400	TriCounty Publishing
Latimer County Today	Wilburton	Non-daily	4,400	TriCounty Publishing
Laverne Leader Tribune	Laverne	Non-daily	1,250	Mark Anderson
Lawton Constitution	Lawton	Daily	20,972	Lawton Publishing
The Lincoln County News	Chandler	Non-daily	4,200	
Lindsay News	Lindsay	Non-daily	2,500	Cable Printing
Lone Grove Ledger	Lone Grove	Non-daily	1,500	
The Madill Record	Madill	Non-daily	4,450	Mark & Sherry Codner
Mangum Star News	Mangum	Non-daily	2,500	Casey Paxton
The Mannford Reporter	Mannford	Non-daily	2,500	GaGoGo by HekTech.
Marietta Monitor	Marietta	Non-daily	3,100	
Marlow Review	Marlow	Non-daily	3,700	John A. Hruby
McAlester News Capital and Democrat	McAlester	Daily	12,600	CNHI
McCurtain County Gazette	Idabel	Daily	6,500	McCurtain County News Inc.
McCurtain Gazette-News	Idabel		4,000	Willingham family
McIntosh County Democrat	Eufaula	Non-daily	3,200	Big Basin Enterprises
Medford Patriot Star & Grant County Journal	Medford	Non-daily	1,500	Big Basin Enterprises
Meeker News	Meeker	Non-daily	1,500	
Miami News-Record	Miami	Daily	14,000	Reid Newspapers
Midwest City Beacon	Midwest City	Non-daily	1,600	Choctaw Times LLC
Minco-Union City Times	Minco	Non-daily	2,100	Choctaw Times LLC
Moore American	Norman	Non-daily	3,400	CNHI
Mooreland Leader	Mooreland	Non-daily	1,300	
Morris News	Morris	Non-daily	850	
Mountain View News	Mountain View	Non-daily	1,200	
Muscogee Nation News	Okmulgee	Non-Daily	7,700	Muscogee (Creek) Nation
Muskogee Daily Phoenix & Times Democrat	Muskogee	Daily	13,044	CNHI
Mustang News	Mustang	Non-daily	1,000	Dyer Publishing
Mustang Times	Mustang	Non-daily	5,000	Choctaw Times LLC
Native American Times	Eastern Oklahoma	Non-daily	9,000	Lisa Snell
Newcastle Pacer	Newcastle	Non-daily	7,000	Kory Oswald
Newkirk Herald Journal	Newkirk	Non-daily	1,550	Winfield Publishing
Nondoc		Online		Sustainable Journalism Foundation (Non-profit)
Norman Transcript	Norman	Daily	11,526	CNHI
Northwest Oklahoman & Ellis County News	Shattuck	Non-daily	1,500	
Nowata Star	Nowata	Non-daily	2,800	Reid Newspapers
The O'Colly	Oklahoma State University	Daily (no weekend editions)		Oklahoma State University
Okarche Chieftain	Okarche	Non-daily		Piedmont Surrey Gazette
Okeene Record	Okeene	Non-daily	1,200	Mack Miller
Okemah News Leader	Okemah	Non-daily	3,000	News Leader Co., Inc.
Oklahoma Banker	Oklahoma City	Non-daily	2,000	OK Bankers Association
Oklahoma City Friday	Oklahoma City	Non-daily	10,000	Nichols Hills Publishing
Oklahoma City Herald	Oklahoma City	Non-daily	35,000	Angela Monson
Oklahoma Daily	OU-Norman	Daily	6,000	University of Oklahoma
Oklahoma Eagle	Tulsa	Non-daily	14,000	James Goodwin
Oklahoma Gazette	Oklahoma City	Non-daily	53,500	Tierra Media Group
The Oklahoman	Oklahoma City	Daily	147,212	GateHouse Media
Okmulgee Daily Times	Okmulgee	Daily	3,100	Sumner Newspapers
Oologah Lake Leader	Oologah	Non-daily	3,000	
Owasso Reporter	Owasso	Weekly	5,100	Community Publishers Inc.
Pauls Valley Daily Democrat	Pauls Valley	Daily	3,100	Community Newspaper Holdings
Pawhuska Journal-Capital	Pawhuska	Weekly	850	
Pawnee Chief	Pawnee	Non-daily	3,000	Ferguson & Ferguson
Perkins Journal	Perkins	Non-daily	3,800	
Perry Daily Journal	Perry	Daily	3,500	Reid Newspapers
Piedmont Surrey Gazette	Piedmont	Non-daily	2,500	Hometown News Inc.
The Ponca City News	Ponca City	Daily	4,300	Kay County Media LLC
Pond Creek Herald	Medford	Non-daily	700	Big Basin Enterprises
Pottawatomie County Democrat	Shawnee	Non-daily	500	
Poteau Daily News	Poteau	Daily	5,000	Horizon Publications
Prague Times Herald	Prague	Non-daily	2,500	
Pryor Daily Times	Pryor	Daily	6,200	CNHI
Purcell Register	Purcell	Non-daily	5,000	
Ringling Eagle	Ringling	Non-daily	1,203	
Rush Springs Gazette	Rush Springs	Non-daily	1,500	
Ryan Leader	Ryan	Non-daily	800	
Sands Springs Leader	Sand Springs	Weekly	4,500	Community Publishers Inc.
Sapulpa Daily Herald	Sapulpa	Daily	5,400	Sumner Publishing
Beckham County Democrat	Elk City	Weekly	1,500	
Seminole Producer	Seminole	Daily	5,400	Stu Phillips
Sentinel Leader	Sentinel	Non-daily	1,400	
Sequoyah County Times	Sallisaw	Non-daily	7,000	Jim Mayo
Shawnee News-Star	Shawnee	Daily	7,175	CherryRoad Media
Shidler Review	Shidler	Non-daily	1,100	Marlene Fields
Skiatook Journal	Skiatook	Weekly	2,800	Community Publishers Inc.
Sooner Catholic	Oklahoma City	Non-daily		Archdiocese of Oklahoma City
Southeast Times	Idabel	Non-daily	1,700	Jerry Ellis
Spiro Graphic	Spiro	Non-daily	3,000	
Stigler News Sentinel	Stigler	Non-daily	3,800	
The Stillwater News-Press	Stillwater	Daily	2,500	CNHI
Stilwell Democrat Journal	Stilwell	Non-daily	7,000	CNHI
Stroud American	Stroud	Non-daily	2,100	
Sulphur Times Democrat	Sulphur	Non-daily	3,800	
Tahlequah Daily Press	Tahlequah	Daily	5,000	CNHI
Talihina American	Talihina	Non-daily	1,900	TriCounty Publishing
Taloga Times Advocate	Taloga	Non-daily	800	
Tecumseh Countywide News	Tecumseh	Non-daily	1,500	
This Land	Tulsa	Non-daily	4,000	
Thomas Tribune	Thomas	Non-daily	1,500	
Tinker Takeoff	Tinker Air Force Base	Non-daily	22,000	Journal Record Publishing
Tonkawa News	Tonkawa	Non-daily	2,000	
Tulsa Beacon	Tulsa	Weekly		Biggs Communications, Inc.
Tulsa World	Tulsa	Daily	102,392	Berkshire Hathaway Inc.
Tuttle Times	Tuttle	Non-daily	1,400	Choctaw Times LLC
University of Tulsa Collegian	University of Tulsa	Non-daily	4,000	University of Tulsa
The US Inquirer	Oklahoma City	Non-daily		Digital First Media
Valliant Leader	Valliant	Non-daily	2,000	
Vian Tenkiller News	Vian	Non-daily	3,000	
Vici Vision	Vici	Non-daily	900	Wathina Walton
Vinita Daily Journal	Vinita	Daily	4,250	Reid Newspapers
The Vista	Edmond	Non-daily	4,000	University of Central Oklahoma
Wagoner Tribune	Wagoner	Non-daily	4,000	Community Publishers Inc.
Wakita Herald	Wakita	Non-daily	650	
Walters Herald	Walters	Non-daily	3,000	Wesner Publications
Washita County Enterprise	Corn	Non-daily	1,000	
Washita Valley Weekly	Chickasha	Non-daily	15,500	
Watonga Republican	Watonga	Non-daily	3,200	
Waurika News-Democrat	Waurika	Non-daily	950	CNHI
Weleetka Weleetkan	Weleetka	Non-daily	1,000	
Westville Reporter	Westville	Non-daily	3,000	
Westville Weekly Times	Westville	Non-daily		
Wewoka Times	Wewoka	Non-daily	1,200	Stu Phillips
Weatherford Daily News	Weatherford	Daily	5,700	Reid Newspapers
Wilson Post Democrat	Wilson	Non-daily		
Woods County Enterprise	Waynoka	Non-daily		
Woodward News	Woodward	Daily	18,500	CNHI
Wynnewood Gazette	Wynnewood	Non-daily		
Yale News	Yale	Non-daily	1,100	
Yukon Review	Yukon	Non-daily	15,000	Conrad Dudderar
Cokv Tvlvme	Seminole Nation of Oklahoma	Non-daily		Seminole Nation of Oklahoma

== List of defunct newspapers ==
Title	Locale	Year est.	Year ceased	Notes
Bigheart Times	Osage County			Formerly published by Louise Redcorn
Bixby Bulletin	Bixby	1905	2012	In 2012, the Bulletin was combined with the Jenks Journal and Glenpool Post to form the South County Leader. The South County Leader ceased publication in 2014.
Branding Iron	Atoka	1884	1884	
The Broken Arrow Ledger	Broken Arrow	1904	2017	Purchased by Tulsa World
Cheyenne Transporter	Darlington Agency	1879	1886	
Choctaw County Times	Hugo			Formerly published by Stan Stamper
Daily Chieftain	Vinita	1898	1902	
Edmond Sun	Edmond	1889	2020	
El Dorado Courier	Eldorado			Formerly published by Joan Gilliam
The Elk Citian	Elk City			
Indian Advocate	Sacred Heart		1910	
Indian Chieftain	Vinita	1882	1902	
Hartshorne Sun	Hartshorne			Formerly published by CNHI
The Muskogee Cimeter	Muskogee	1904	1921	African-American newspaper founded by William Twine
Muskogee Star	Muskogee	1912	1913	African-American newspaper founded by A. J. Smitherman; succeeded by the Tulsa Star
The Oklahoma (City) Times	Oklahoma City	1889	1984	
Skiatook Sentinel	Skiatook	1905		
Tulsa Business Journal	Tulsa			Formerly published by Community Publishing
Tulsa County News	Tulsa		2012	Published by Gary Percefull
Tulsa Star	Tulsa	1913	1921	African-American newspaper founded by A. J. Smitherman; defunct after Tulsa Race Massacre
Tulsa Tribune	Tulsa	1919	1992	
Urban Tulsa Weekly	Tulsa			Formerly published by Keith Skrzypczak
Vinita Daily Chieftain	Vinita	1902	1913	

== See also ==
- Oklahoma media
  - List of radio stations in Oklahoma
  - List of television stations in Oklahoma
  - Media of locales in Oklahoma: Broken Arrow, Lawton, Norman, Oklahoma City, Tulsa
- Journalism
  - Category:Journalists from Oklahoma
  - University of Oklahoma Gaylord College of Journalism and Mass Communication
U.S. newspapers

Comprehensive

- Lists of newspapers
- List of newspapers in the United States

Frequency

- List of free daily newspapers in the United States
- List of weekly newspapers in the United States

Circulation

- List of international newspapers originating in the United States
- List of national newspapers in the United States
- List of newspapers in the United States by circulation

Foreign language

- List of French-language newspapers published in the United States
- List of German-language newspapers published in the United States
- List of Spanish-language newspapers published in the United States

Specialty

- List of African-American newspapers in the United States
- List of alternative weekly newspapers in the United States
- List of business newspapers in the United States
- List of family-owned newspapers in the United States
- List of Jewish newspapers in the United States
- List of LGBTQ periodicals in the United States
- List of student newspapers in the United States
- List of supermarket tabloids in the United States
- List of underground press in the United States

Other

- List of defunct newspapers of the United States

== Bibliography ==
- "Oklahoma". American Newspaper Directory. New York: George P. Rowell. 1900. pp. 860+. hdl:2027/umn.31951002273861a – via HathiTrust.
- "Oklahoma". American Newspaper Annual & Directory. Philadelphia: N. W. Ayer & Son. 1922. pp. 803+. hdl:2027/umn.31951001295695n.
- Grace E. Ray (1928). Early Oklahoma Newspapers.
- Joseph B. Thoburn and John W. Sharp. History of the Oklahoma Press and the Oklahoma Press Association (Oklahoma City: Oklahoma Press Association, 1930).
- Federal Writers' Project (1941), "Newspapers", Oklahoma: a Guide to the Sooner State, American Guide Series, Norman: University of Oklahoma Press, pp. 74–82, ISBN 9781603540353 – via Google Books
- G. Thomas Tanselle (1971). "General Studies: Oklahoma". Guide to the Study of United States Imprints. Harvard University Press. p. 870. ISBN 978-0-674-36761-6. (Includes information about newspapers)
- Nudie Williams (1983). "Black Press in Oklahoma: The Formative Years, 1889-1907". Chronicles of Oklahoma. 61.
- L. Edward Carter. The Story of Oklahoma Newspapers, 1844 to 1984 (Oklahoma City: Oklahoma Heritage Association, 1984).
