= James Lankford =

American politician (born 1968)

The Reverend James Lankford
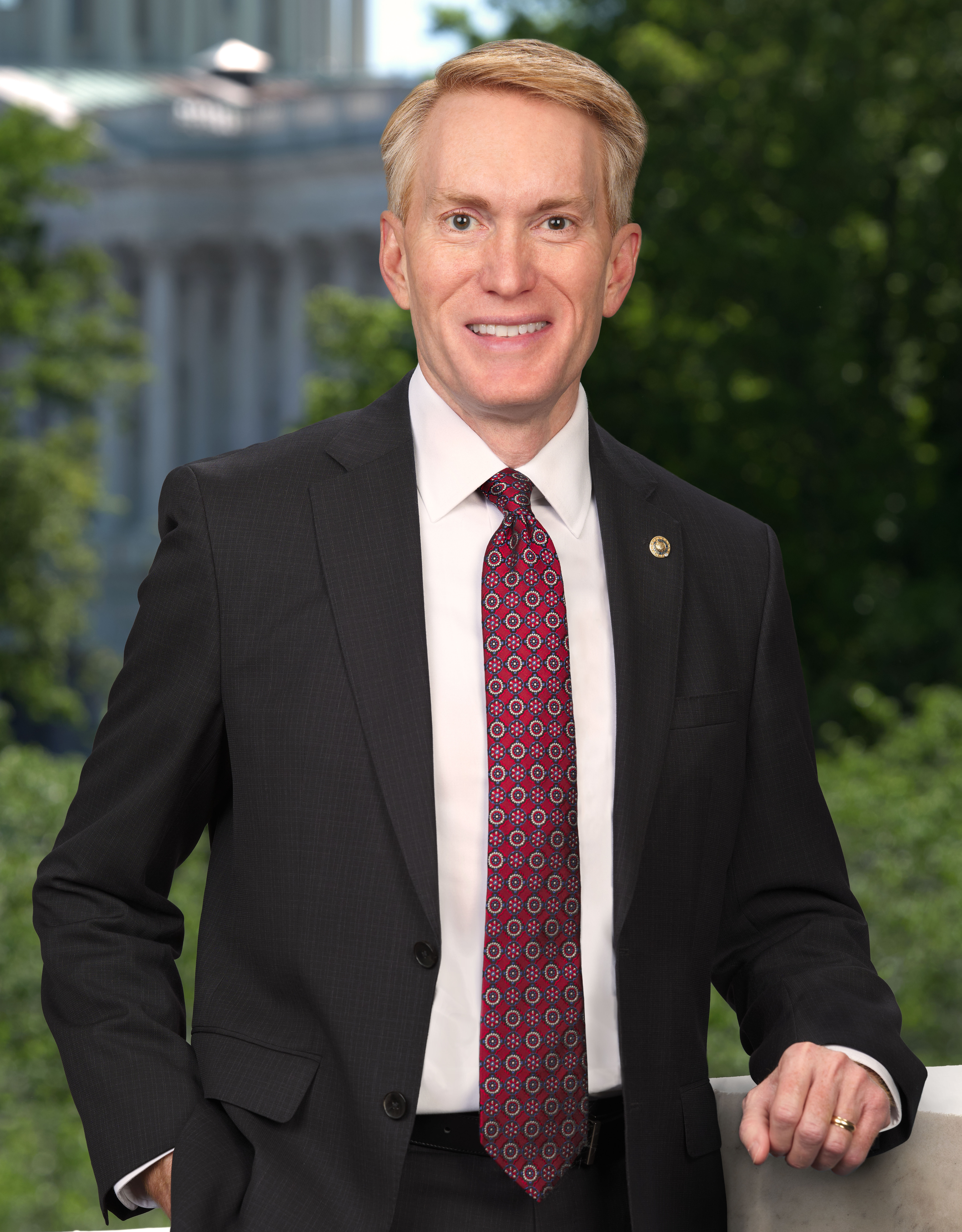
- Official portrait, 2023

United States Senator from Oklahoma
- Incumbent
- Assumed office January 3, 2015 Serving with Alan Armstrong
- Preceded by: Tom Coburn
Committee positions
Vice Chair of the Senate Republican Conference
Incumbent
Assumed office January 3, 2025
Leader	John Thune
Preceded by	Shelley Moore Capito
Chair of the Senate Ethics Committee
Incumbent
Assumed office January 3, 2025
Preceded by	Chris Coons
In office December 19, 2019 – February 3, 2021
Preceded by	Johnny Isakson
Succeeded by	Chris Coons
Vice Chair of the Senate Ethics Committee
In office February 3, 2021 – January 3, 2025
Preceded by	Chris Coons
Succeeded by	Chris Coons
Chair of the House Republican Policy Committee
In office January 3, 2013 – January 3, 2015
Leader	John Boehner
Preceded by	Tom Price
Succeeded by	Luke Messer

Member of the U.S. House of Representatives from Oklahoma's 5th district
- In office January 3, 2011 – January 3, 2015
- Preceded by: Mary Fallin
- Succeeded by: Steve Russell

Personal details
- Born: James Paul Lankford; March 4, 1968 (age 58) Dallas, Texas, U.S.
- Party: Republican
- Spouse: Cindy Hennessey (m. 1992)
- Children: 2
- Education: University of Texas at Austin (BS); Southwestern Baptist Theological Seminary (MDiv)
- Website: Senate website Campaign website
- Lankford's voice Lankford opposing the Equality Act. Recorded March 17, 2021

James Paul Lankford (born March 4, 1968) is an American Southern Baptist minister and politician serving as the senior United States senator from Oklahoma, a seat he has held since 2015. From 2011 to 2015, he represented Oklahoma's 5th congressional district in the U.S. House of Representatives. He is a member of the Republican Party.

From 1996 to 2009, Lankford was president of the Falls Creek Baptist Conference Center, a youth camp operated by the Baptist General Convention of Oklahoma. He is an ordained Southern Baptist minister.

Lankford was first elected to Congress in 2010 and was reelected in 2012. He was elected to the Senate in a 2014 special election, and was reelected in 2016 and 2022.

== Early life and education ==
Lankford was born March 4, 1968, in Dallas, Texas, the son of Linda Joyce (née House) and James Wesley Lankford. His mother was an elementary school librarian. His maternal grandparents owned a small dry-cleaning business, his father and paternal grandparents a dairy farm. His stepfather was a career employee of AC Delco, the parts division of General Motors.

Lankford's parents divorced when he was four; he lived with his mother and older brother for a time in his grandparents' garage apartment. He became a Christian at eight. His mother remarried when he was twelve, and the family moved to Garland, Texas, with his stepfather.

Lankford attended Lakeview Centennial High School in Garland. While there, he participated in the Close Up Washington civic education program. He earned a Bachelor of Science degree in secondary education (specializing in speech and history) from the University of Texas at Austin in 1990, and a Master of Divinity degree from Southwestern Baptist Theological Seminary in 1994. Lankford is an ordained Southern Baptist minister.

== Ministerial career ==
Lankford moved to Oklahoma in 1995. He was president of the Falls Creek Baptist Conference Center, a youth camp operated by the Baptist General Convention of Oklahoma, from 1996 to 2009. Lankford stepped down from his position at Falls Creek in 2009 to run for Congress.

== U.S. House of Representatives ==
=== Elections ===
==== 2010 ====
After two-term incumbent Republican Mary Fallin announced she was giving up her seat to run for governor of Oklahoma, Lankford entered the race to succeed her. He finished first in a seven-way Republican primary—the important contest in this heavily Republican district—and defeated former State Representative Kevin Calvey in the runoff. He then defeated Democrat Billy Coyle in the general election with 62.53% of the vote.

==== 2012 ====
Lankford defeated Democrat Tom Guild with 59% of the vote in 2012. Following the election, he was named chairman of the House Republican Policy Committee.

=== House Committee assignments ===
- Committee on the Budget
- Committee on Oversight and Government Reform
  - United States House Oversight Subcommittee on Energy Policy, Health Care and Entitlements (chairman)
- United States House of Representatives Republican Policy Committee (chair)

=== Caucus memberships ===
- Congressional Coalition on Adoption

== U.S. Senate ==
=== Elections ===
==== 2014 ====
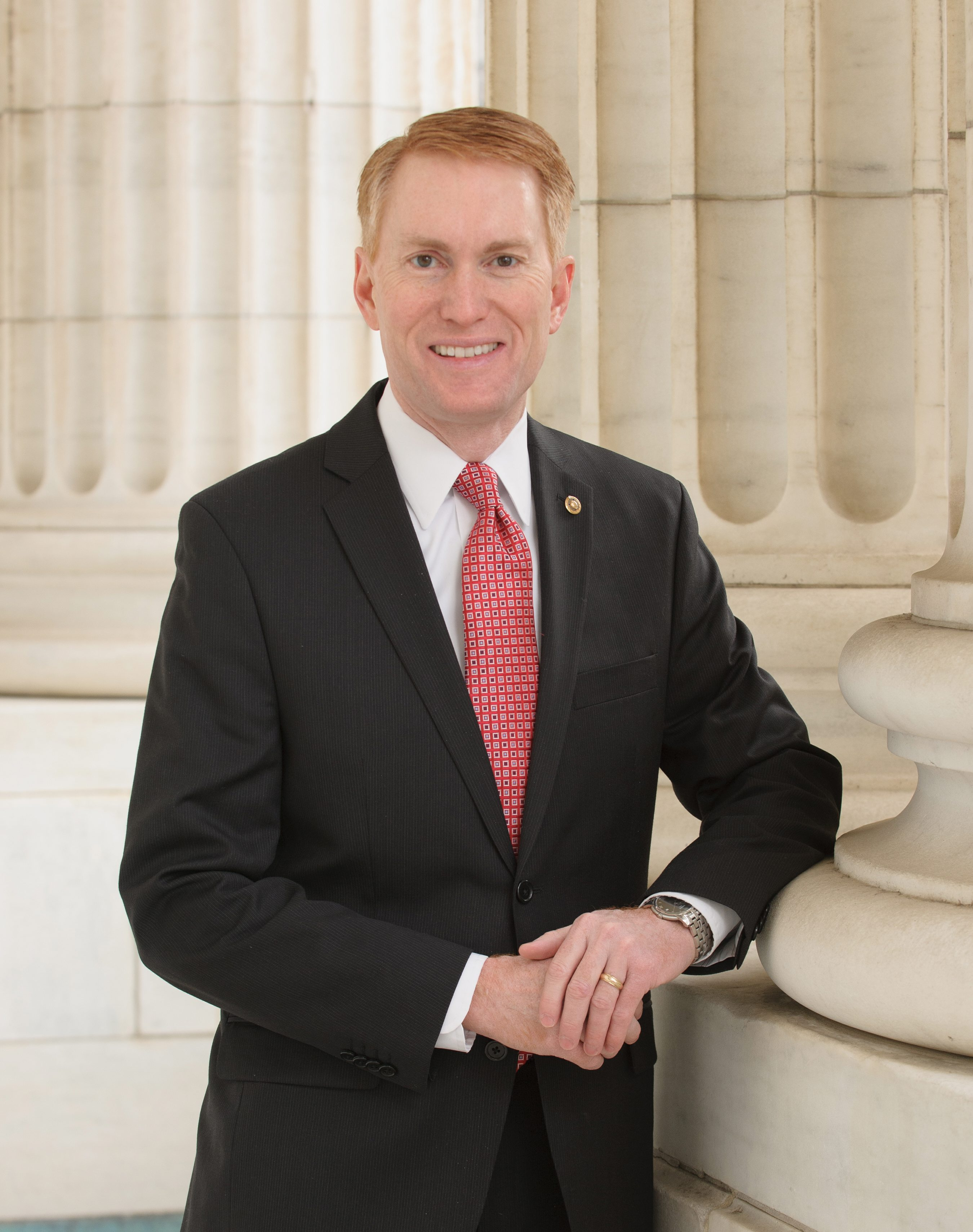
Official portrait, 2015

In January 2014, Lankford announced he would run in the 2014 Senate special election to succeed retiring Republican Senator Tom Coburn. Lankford won the June 2014 Republican primary, defeating former state House speaker T.W. Shannon and former state senator Randy Brogdon. In November, Lankford won the election for the final two years of Coburn's second term, defeating retiring state senator Constance N. Johnson, 67.9%-29.0%. Independent candidate Mark Beard won the remaining 3.2% of the vote.

==== 2016 ====
Lankford was elected to a full six-year term in the Senate in 2016, defeating Democratic consultant Mike Workman with 68% of the vote.

==== 2022 ====
On April 6, 2021, Lankford announced he would seek reelection. He was reelected with 64% of the vote.

=== Tenure ===
Lankford was sworn into office on January 6, 2015, by Vice President Joe Biden.

On December 21, 2017, Lankford was one of six senators to introduce the Secure Elections Act, which would authorize block grants to states to update outdated voting technology.

Lankford became the senior U.S. senator from Oklahoma in 2023 upon the retirement of Senator Jim Inhofe.

Lankford was the lead Senate Republican negotiator on a bipartisan bill intended to resolve the Mexico–United States border crisis. House Republicans were skeptical of the bill before the text was released, and Senate Republicans also swiftly turned against the bill upon its release on February 4, 2024, after Donald Trump said he did not want President Joe Biden to score a political win with it. On February 7, Senate Republicans blocked the bill in a floor vote, with only four of the 14 Republican votes needed in favor. Lankford said on the floor before the vote that a "popular commentator" had told him a month earlier, "If you try to move a bill that solves the border crisis during this presidential year, I will do whatever I can to destroy you, because I do not want you to solve this during the presidential election." Two days before the vote, Trump told a radio host, "This is a very bad bill for his career", while also falsely asserting he had never endorsed Lankford. The Oklahoma Republican Party censured Lankford days before the bill was released, asserting he was "playing fast and loose" with Democrats. The National Border Patrol Council, a union representing 18,000 border patrol officers, quickly endorsed the bill upon its release; the union had endorsed Trump in 2020 and sharply criticized Biden's border policies.

==== Big Beautiful Bill ====
In 2025, Lankford voted for the Big Beautiful Bill championed by the Trump administration after it passed the House. The bill cuts funding for Medicaid and adds a work requirement for those receiving benefits. According to USA Today, it also adds a "projected $3.3 trillion to the nation's debt over a decade". An estimated 110,000 Oklahomans would lose healthcare coverage, while the wealthiest households would see the largest tax breaks. Oklahoma doctors spoke out against the cuts to Medicaid.

=== Senate Committee assignments ===
- Committee on Finance
  - Subcommittee on Energy, Natural Resources, and Infrastructure (Chair)
  - Subcommittee on Health Care
  - Subcommittee on Taxation and IRS Oversight
- Committee on Homeland Security and Governmental Affairs
  - Permanent Subcommittee on Investigations
  - Subcommittee on Border Management, Federal Workforce, and Regulatory Affairs (Chair)
- Select Committee on Ethics (Chair)
- Senate Select Committee on Intelligence

=== Caucus memberships ===
- Rare Disease Caucus
- Senate Taiwan Caucus

== Political positions ==
=== Taxes ===
Lankford supports budget austerity through lowering taxes and reducing government spending. He took the taxpayer protection pledge promising to support no new taxes. He supports the repeal of the income and estate taxes and supports a sales tax to tax consumption and not savings or earnings.

=== Guns ===
In 2014, Lankford was endorsed by the NRA Political Victory Fund and had an "A" grade from the group. Lankford supports loosening restrictions on interstate gun purchases. He opposes firearm microstamping, a controversial method of imprinting casings with a unique marking to match it with a specific firearm, and would allow veterans to register unlicensed firearms.

After the 2018 Stoneman Douglas High School shooting in which the perpetrator used a Smith & Wesson M&P15 AR-15 style rifle to kill 17 and wound 17 others, Lankford said on NBC News' Meet the Press that he was open to requiring more comprehensive background checks for firearm purchases, saying, "The problem is not owning an AR-15, it’s the person who owns it."

=== Cannabis ===
Lankford opposed a 2018 ballot measure to legalize medical marijuana in Oklahoma, calling it "harmful to the social fabric of Oklahoma" and arguing that it would have a "dramatic effect on our families and our schools and our businesses and the future of our state". He also appeared in a video ad calling for defeat of the initiative, stating: "Our families won't be better if more parents and grandparents smoke more marijuana." The measure passed with 57% of the vote.

In 2015, Lankford introduced the Keeping out Illegal Drugs (KIDS) Act to block federal funds for Indian tribes that allow the cultivation or distribution of marijuana on their land. Lankford stated: "It is important for our nation to help address this issue for the sake of the next generation of Native Americans. This legislation is a good step in trying to protect young tribal members and fulfill our trust responsibility to Native Americans."

=== Defense ===
Lankford supports extending the Patriot Act and expanding roving wiretaps occurring in the US.

=== Environment ===
Lankford supports expanding exploration of gas and oil both domestically and on the outer continental shelf. He opposes the Environmental Protection Agency regulating emission standards as he believes it hinders economic growth. Lankford believes manure and other fertilizers should not be classified as pollutants or hazardous.

Lankford has rejected the scientific consensus on climate change, calling it a "myth" in 2010. In 2018, he strongly criticized the National Science Foundation for funding projects that seek to increase reporting on climate change in weathercasts, saying it "is not science—it is propagandizing."

According to OpenSecrets, during his career, Lankford has taken over $1.5 million from the oil and gas industry, his largest industry donor.

=== Healthcare ===
Lankford opposes the Affordable Care Act (Obamacare) and has voted to repeal it. In a 2017 Facebook post, he claimed "Since 2013, a majority of states are seeing premiums and costs double, including states that expanded Medicaid".

Lankford has stated his belief that federally funded health insurance is unconstitutional and that he will oppose any and all moves for a federal healthcare system. He supported an initiative to allow Medicare choice and institute budget cuts.

=== Abortion ===
Lankford opposes abortion. He believes Congress should recognize life at the moment of fertilization. He opposes any federally funded programs that allow for abortion, as well as Planned Parenthood and other similar groups.

=== LGBTQ rights ===
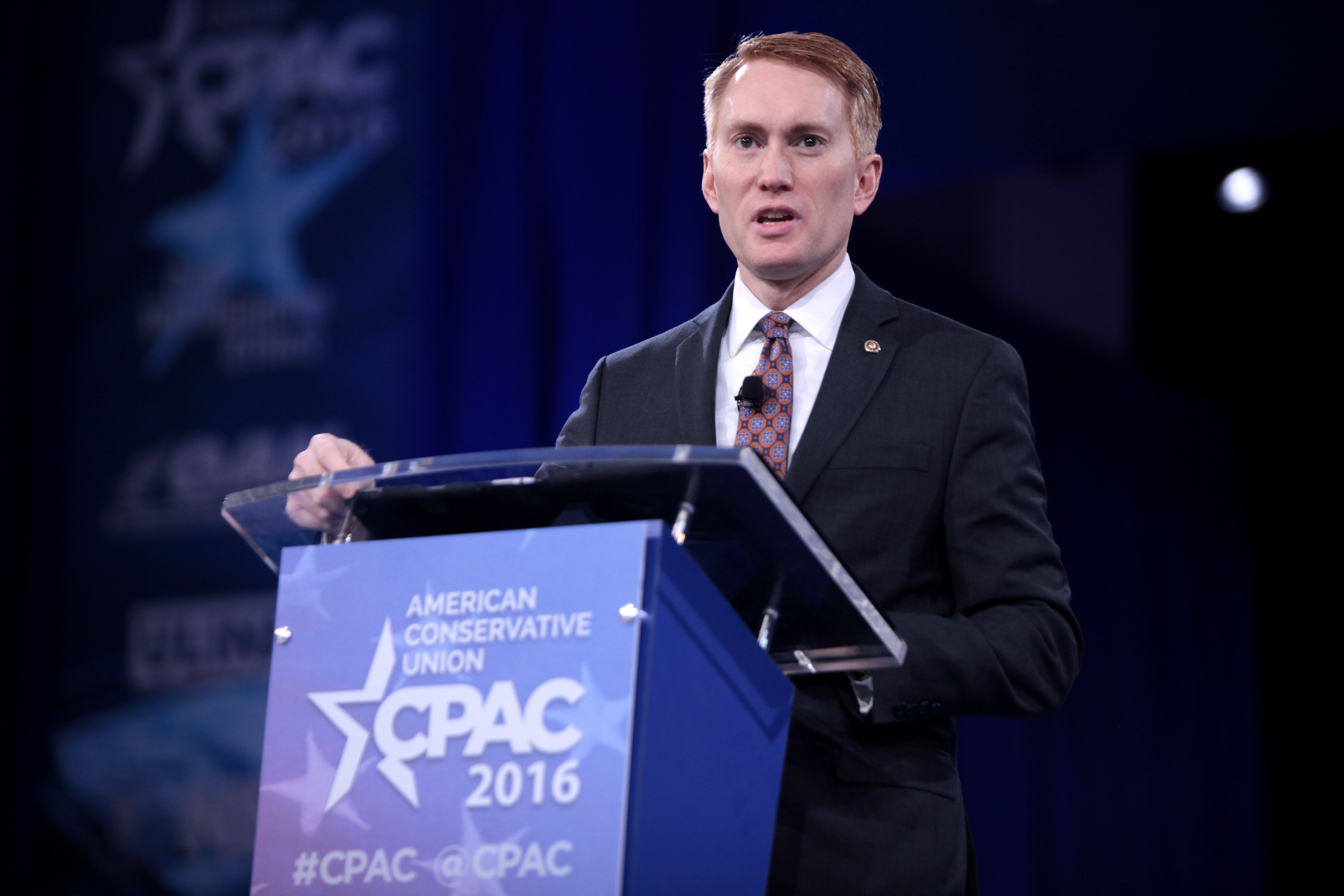
Lankford speaking at the Conservative Political Action Conference (CPAC) in 2016

Lankford opposes same-sex marriage. In the early days of his 2010 campaign for the House of Representatives, Lankford disparaged the Matthew Shepard and James Byrd Jr. Hate Crimes Prevention Act, which expanded hate crime legislation to include greater penalties for hate crimes motivated by the victim's sexual orientation or race.

Lankford supported Oklahoma Question 711, a statewide constitutional ban on same-sex marriage and civil unions that passed in 2004 with 75% of the vote and remained law until it was challenged in court and struck down by a federal judge as unconstitutional in 2014. Lankford lambasted the decision, saying that "marriage is a state issue and Oklahoma has spoken." He also endorsed the Defense of Marriage Act and condemned the 2013 Supreme Court decision striking down parts of the law.

Lankford has defended businesses and individuals opposing LGBTQ rights, including Chick-fil-A in the wake of its denunciation over donations to groups opposing same-sex marriage, and Phil Robertson after he was suspended from Duck Dynasty in 2013 following comments regarded as anti-LGBTQ and racist. Lankford attacked A&E for suspending Robertson, writing that Robertson "should be able to speak his views without fear of being silenced."

In 2012, five days after President Barack Obama announced his support for same-sex marriage and became the first sitting U.S. president to do so, Lankford told a ThinkProgress interviewer that he believed homosexuality is a choice and that employers should be allowed to terminate workers for their sexual orientation: "I think it's a choice issue." After LGBT advocates condemned his statements, Lankford defended himself on local television, reiterating his view that homosexuality is a choice.

After the Southern Poverty Law Center designated the Alliance Defending Freedom (ADF) an anti-LGBT hate group, Lankford criticized the designation and defended the ADF, which had described same-sex marriage as a threat to a "healthy, free and stable society."

In 2015, Lankford condemned the Supreme Court ruling in Obergefell v. Hodges, which held that same-sex marriage bans violated the constitution.

In 2022, Lankford voted against the Respect for Marriage Act, which later passed, repealing the Defense of Marriage Act (DOMA) and requiring all U.S. states and territories to recognize the validity of same-sex marriages. He said the bill disrespected religious liberty and had the potential to cause even more division among Americans. According to Lankford, the bill was about not equality but rather "making some people's rights more important than others'".

=== Xinjiang ===
In August 2018, Lankford, Marco Rubio, and 15 other lawmakers urged the Trump administration to impose sanctions under the Global Magnitsky Act against Chinese officials responsible for human rights abuses in western China's Xinjiang region. They wrote: "The detention of as many as a million or more Uyghurs and other predominantly Muslim ethnic minorities in "political reeducation" centers or camps requires a tough, targeted, and global response."

=== Race relations ===
In June 2020, Lankford criticized President Trump's decision to walk to the St John's Episcopal Church near the White House, calling it "confrontational". In a BBC interview he said that racism passes on from one generation to the next, and he challenged families to invite a family of a different ethnicity to their home for a meal, to "allow friendship to develop where there has only been friendliness in the past".

In January 2021, after Lankford questioned the validity of the 2020 presidential election, some Black Tulsa leaders called for him to resign from both the 1921 Race Massacre Centennial Committee and the Senate. They saw the fraud allegations, which focused on primarily Black cities, as an attack on Black voters. Lankford later apologized for his role in casting doubt on Black votes.

=== 2020 election ===
After Joe Biden won the 2020 presidential election and Trump refused to concede, Lankford said he would intervene and ensure that Biden, the incoming president, would receive intelligence briefings. Shortly thereafter, he backtracked, said the media had twisted his words, and said "I'm not in a hurry, necessarily, to get Joe Biden these briefings."

Lankford initially announced plans to object to the counting of some swing states' electoral votes as part of an attempt to overturn the 2020 United States presidential election, but he reversed course after the 2021 United States Capitol attack. He later apologized for casting doubt on the validity of the presidential election results in several swing states.

Lankford voted to acquit in the second impeachment trial of Donald Trump.

On May 28, 2021, Lankford voted against creating the January 6 commission.

=== Earmarks ===
In 2021, Lankford opposed bringing back earmarks to the Senate.

=== Religion ===
Lankford praised the Supreme Court decision Groff v. DeJoy for making it "clear to every employer that Americans can have a faith and live their faith everywhere, including at work".

=== Veterans ===
In 2022, Lankford was among the 11 senators who voted against the Honoring our PACT Act of 2022, a bill that funded research and benefits for up to 3.5 million veterans exposed to toxic substances during their service.

== Personal life ==
Lankford and his wife, Cindy, have two daughters. He attends Quail Springs Baptist Church, a Southern Baptist church in Oklahoma City.

== Electoral history ==
=== Oklahoma's 5th congressional district election, 2010 ===
Republican primary
Party	Candidate	Votes	%
Republican	James Lankford	18,760	33.58
Republican	Kevin Calvey	18,147	32.48
Republican	Mike Thompson	10,008	17.91
Republican	Shane Jett	5,956	10.66
Republican	Johnny Roy	1,548	2.77
Republican	Rick Flanigan	762	1.36
Republican	Harry Johnson	686	1.23
Total		55,867	100

Republican primary runoff
Party	Candidate	Votes	%
Republican	James Lankford	29,817	65.22
Republican	Kevin Calvey	15,902	34.78
Total		45,719	100

General election
Party	Candidate	Votes	%
Republican	James Lankford	123,236	62.52
Democratic	Billy Coyle	68,074	34.54
Independent	Clark Duffe	3,067	1.56
Independent	Dave White	2,728	1.38
Total		197,105	100
Republican hold			

=== Oklahoma's 5th congressional district election, 2012 ===
General election
Party	Candidate	Votes	%
Republican	James Lankford (Incumbent)	153,603	58.70
Democratic	Tom Guild	97,504	37.30
Independent	Pat Martin	5,394	2.10
Independent	Robert Murphy	5,176	2.00
Total		261,677	100
Republican hold			

=== U.S. Senate special election in Oklahoma, 2014 ===
Republican primary
Party	Candidate	Votes	%
Republican	James Lankford	152,749	57.20
Republican	T. W. Shannon	91,854	34.40
Republican	Randy Brogdon	12,934	4.80
Republican	Kevin Crow	2,828	1.10
Republican	Andy Craig	2,427	0.90
Republican	Eric McCray	2,272	0.90
Republican	Jason Weger	1,794	0.70
Total		266,858	100

General election
Party	Candidate	Votes	%
Republican	James Lankford	557,002	67.90
Democratic	Connie Johnson	237,923	29.00
Independent	Mark T. Beard	25,965	3.20
Total		820,890	100
Republican hold			

=== U.S. Senate election in Oklahoma, 2016 ===
General election
Party	Candidate	Votes	%
Republican	James Lankford (Incumbent)	980,892	67.7
Democratic	Mike Workman	355,911	24.58
Libertarian	Robert Murphy	43,421	3.00
Independent	Sean Braddy	40,405	2.79
Independent	Mark T. Beard	27,418	1.89
Total		1,448,047	100.00
Republican hold			

=== U.S. Senate election in Oklahoma, 2022 ===
General election
Party	Candidate	Votes	%
Republican	James Lankford (Incumbent)	739,960	64.3
Democratic	Madison Horn	369,370	32.1
Independent	Michael Delaney	20,907	1.8
Libertarian	Kenneth Blevins	20,495	1.8
Total			100.00
Republican hold			

== Notes ==
U.S. House of Representatives
Preceded by Mary Fallin	Member of the U.S. House of Representatives from Oklahoma's 5th congressional district 2011–2015	Succeeded by Steve Russell
Party political offices
Preceded by Tom Price	Chair of the House Republican Policy Committee; 2013–2015	Succeeded by Luke Messer
Preceded by Tom Coburn	Republican nominee for U.S. Senator from Oklahoma (Class 3); 2014, 2016, 2022	Most recent
Preceded by Shelley Moore Capito	Vice Chair of the Senate Republican Conference; 2025–present	Incumbent
U.S. Senate
Preceded by Tom Coburn	U.S. Senator (Class 3) from Oklahoma; 2015–present Served alongside: Jim Inhofe, Markwayne Mullin, Alan Armstrong, Kevin Hern (elect)	Incumbent
Preceded by Johnny Isakson	Chair of the Senate Ethics Committee; 2019–2021	Succeeded by Chris Coons
Preceded by Chris Coons	Vice Chair of the Senate Ethics Committee; 2021–2025	Succeeded by Chris Coons
Preceded by Chris Coons	Chair of the Senate Ethics Committee; 2025–present	Incumbent
U.S. order of precedence (ceremonial)
Preceded by Steve Daines	Order of precedence of the United States as United States Senator	Succeeded by Dan Sullivan
Preceded by Bill Cassidy	United States senators by seniority 49th	Succeeded by Tom Cotton
