= Charles W. Blackwell =

American lawyer

Ambassador of the Chickasaw Nation to the United States
- In office 1995–2013
- Appointed by: Bill Anoatubby
- Preceded by: Office created
- Succeeded by: Neal McCaleb

Personal details
- Born: July 30, 1942 El Reno, Oklahoma, United States
- Died: January 2, 2013 (aged 70) Washington, D.C.
- Occupation: Lawyer

Charles W. Blackwell (July 30, 1942 – January 2, 2013, Chickasaw Nation) was an American lawyer, educator, activist, and diplomat, who served as the first Ambassador of the Chickasaw Nation to the United States of America, from 1995 until his death in 2013. Blackwell was the first Ambassador of any Native American tribal government to the government of the United States. From 1990 to 1995, he had served as the Chickasaw Nation delegate to the US Congress, while also working on issues of health, education, and economic development for tribal nations.

== Biography ==
=== Early life and career ===
Charles Blackwell was born at Concho Indian Hospital in El Reno, Oklahoma, on July 30, 1942. He was raised in Tishomingo, Oklahoma. His ancestry included both Choctaw and Chickasaw. As a boy, he spent most summers with his grandparents, who were educators employed by the Bureau of Indian Affairs (BIA) at reservation schools on the North Plains and in New Mexico. This experience formed his deep ties to Picuris Pueblo in New Mexico and Loneman School on the Pine Ridge Indian Reservation. At Pine Ridge, he became fluent in the Lakota language, having already learned Chickasaw and Choctaw.

Blackwell earned a Bachelor of Arts in education from East Central State College (present-day East Central University) in 1964, where he was named "Student of the Year" that year. He served as editor of the college's newspaper, and was the founding president of the Epsilon Omega chapter of Pi Kappa Alpha fraternity. After receiving his degree, he taught English at Window Rock High School in Fort Defiance, Arizona.

In 1972, Blackwell earned a Juris Doctor from the University of New Mexico School of Law. After graduation, he first worked as a staff attorney at the American Indian Law Center from 1972 to 1974. Blackwell served as the Associate Director of the Special Scholarship Program in Law for American Indians from 1974 until 1977. (Note: Blackwell helped place more than 700 Native American and Native Alaskans in law schools throughout the U.S.) He simultaneously served as both an assistant dean and adjunct professor at the University of New Mexico School of Law, his alma mater, from 1974 to 1977 as well.

In 1979, Blackwell founded a group that was later named Native Affairs and Development Group. In 1985 he relocated to Washington, D.C.

=== Delegate to Congress and Ambassador of the Chickasaw Nation (1995–2013) ===
In 1990, Chickasaw Nation Governor Bill Anoatubby appointed Blackwell as delegate to the United States Congress, a non-voting position. In 1995 he appointed Blackwell as Chickasaw Nation ambassador to the US.

Anoatubby and Blackwell discussed how he might contribute to representing the Nation to the US before his appointments. He agreed there was a need to revive the tradition of diplomacy with other governments. According to Governor Anoatubby,

"We agreed that there was a need for the tribes to revive a tradition of diplomatic relations with other governments...Appointment of an official ambassador helped to reinforce the formal government-to-government relationship the Chickasaw Nation had with the federal government. Over the years, Charles did a tremendous job of helping that relationship grow and improve."

As noted, in 1995, Governor Anoatubby appointed Blackwell as the first Ambassador of the Chickasaw Nation to the United States. Blackwell was the first Native American ambassador to the U.S., and the first tribal ambassador from any Native American government to the United States. He took office at a 1995 ceremony held in Washington, D.C. Blackwell held the ambassadorship from 1995 until his death in office in January 2013.

During his tenure, Blackwell became a prominent advocate for Native American education, health, and economic issues. Blackwell also founded the First American Business Center, headquartered in Washington D.C., which promotes Native American economic development and entrepreneurship. He served on the Western Governors' States Drought Coordination Council from 1995 to 1997. Ambassador Blackwell contributed to the Chickasaw Times as a frequent columnist.

In 1997, U.S. President Bill Clinton appointed Blackwell to the Presidential Advisory Council on HIV/AIDS. He served on as the Council's only Native American member from 1997 until 2001.

== Death ==
Blackwell died in office in Washington, D.C., on January 2, 2013, at the age of 70. The cause of death was "...of respiratory complications following surgery."

Chickasaw Governor Bill Anoatubby released a statement praising Blackwell,

"Charles Blackwell embodied all the best qualities of a diplomat and statesman as the Chickasaw Nation Ambassador to the United States. He brought a tremendous level of wisdom, integrity, knowledge and passion to his duties as our emissary in Washington...As one who was fortunate enough to call Charles my friend, it is with great sadness that my condolences go out to his family and other close friends. This is a sad day for the entire Chickasaw Nation, as we have lost an irreplaceable friend and unrivaled advocate."

An official memorial service was held at the National Museum of the American Indian in Washington on January 26, 2013. He was the first tribal leader to be so honored. Memorial services were also planned to be held in Ada, Oklahoma, and Albuquerque, New Mexico.

== Honors and awards ==
- The U.S. Department of Commerce Minority Business Development Agency awarded Blackwell the National Director's Legacy Award for Lifetime Achievement in 2007.
- He received a Special Act Award from the Secretary of the Department of Energy in 2006.
