= Ranking member =

Senior member of a congressional or state legislative committee

In United States politics, a ranking member is the most senior member of a congressional or state legislative committee from the minority party. On many committees the ranking minority member, along with the Chair, serve as ex officio members of all of the committee's subcommittees.

Both the United States Senate and United States House of Representatives use ranking members as part of their legislative structure. When party control of a legislative chamber changes, a committee's ranking member generally becomes chairman, and vice versa.

== Congressional usage ==
Four Senate committees refer to the ranking minority member as vice chairman. The following committees follow the chairman/vice chairman structure for the majority and minority parties.

- Senate Committee on Appropriations
- Senate Committee on Indian Affairs
- Senate Select Committee on Ethics
- Senate Select Committee on Intelligence

Other Senate committees refer to the ranking minority members as ranking member.

The House of Representatives normally does not use the term vice chairman for the ranking minority member, though some committees do have a vice-chairman position, usually assigned to a senior member of the majority party other than the chairman. House committees that follow this structure are:

- House Committee on Agriculture
- House Committee on Appropriations
- House Committee on the Budget
- House Committee on Education and the Workforce
- House Committee on Energy and Commerce
- House Committee on Financial Services
- House Committee on Government Reform
- House Committee on Foreign Affairs
- House Committee on Resources
- House Committee on Veterans' Affairs
- House Permanent Select Committee on Intelligence (subcommittees only)

The position of vice chair as the designation for the ranking minority member has been used for the House January 6 Committee.

Joint committees of the House and Senate operate in much the same way, with a chairman and vice-chairman from the majority party, alternating between a member of the House and a member of the Senate, and often two ranking members from both bodies.
