= Inquirer =

Inquirer or The Inquirer may refer to:

- The Inquirer, a British technology news website
- The Inquirer (Liberia), a Liberian newspaper
- The Inquirer (Perth) a newspaper published in Perth, Western Australia, between 1840 and 1855
- The Inquirer, a British Unitarianism magazine that has been published since 1842
- The Philadelphia Inquirer, an American newspaper
- Philippine Daily Inquirer, a Filipino newspaper
  - Radyo Inquirer, its AM radio station
- The New York Daily Inquirer, a fictional newspaper in the film Citizen Kane
- The St. Louis Inquirer, a fictional newspaper in the film Citizen Kane
- The Indianapolis Daily Inquirer, a fictional newspaper in the film The Magnificent Ambersons
- The US Inquirer, an American newspaper

== See also ==
- Enquirer (disambiguation)
