= Baptist Village Communities =

Baptist Village Communities (BVC) is a non-profit organization that provides ageing services throughout Oklahoma. Established in 1958 in Hugo, Oklahoma, the BVC assists in living, nursing services, and memory support. Personal care opportunities such as dining, life enrichment programs, salons, house and lawn maintenance, and scheduled transportation are also offered.

The stated mission of the group is "To honor God by creating communities and services to enhance lives and enable people to serve God and one another."

BVC has 12 locations throughout Oklahoma.

== Programs ==
Entrusted Hearts by Baptist Village (EH) is a Medicare and Medicaid-certified service of Baptist Village Communities that provides assistance with daily living in clients' homes. EH is located in the Lawton, Oklahoma City, and Owasso areas.

EH also provides medical equipment and supplies to clients in these areas. These items are offered to a range of recipients, including individuals, long-term care communities, assistance-in-living communities and medical providers.

LINC® (Loving, Inspiring, Nurturing, Caring) is a program of Baptist Village Communities. LINC® is designed to work with local Southern Baptist churches, senior living communities and health centers, linking them together. LINC® consultants are utilized to assist churches in meeting the needs of residents. Comprehensive LINC® training workshops are offered throughout the year across the state.

Baptist Village Communities is an affiliate of the Baptist General Convention of Oklahoma.
