= Enquirer =

Enquirer or The Enquirer may refer to:

== Publications ==
- National Enquirer, an American supermarket tabloid newspaper
- National Enquirer (1836), an American abolitionist newspaper from Pennsylvania
- The Cincinnati Enquirer, an American newspaper from Ohio
- Columbus Ledger-Enquirer, an American newspaper from Georgia

== Organizations ==
- The Enquirers, an archaic name for the British postal police office

== See also ==
- Inquirer (disambiguation)
