= Bixby High School =

Location
- 601 S Riverview; Bixby, Oklahoma 74008; 35.9350°N 95.8741°W

Information
- Type: Public high school
- Opened: 1909
- School district: Bixby Public Schools
- Superintendent: Lydia Wilson
- Principal: Kyle Smith
- Teaching staff: 117.21 (on an FTE basis)
- Grades: 9–12
- Enrollment: 2,405 (2024–2025)
- Student to teacher ratio: 20.52
- Colors: Red and Blue
- Team name: Spartans
- Website: www.bixbyps.org/o/bixby-high-school

Bixby High School is a public high school located in Bixby, Oklahoma, United States. It is a part of Bixby Public Schools.

== History ==
The first Bixby High School was built in 1908 with classes beginning in 1909.

== Athletics ==
=== Teams ===
Bixby's athletic teams are nicknamed the Spartans and the school's colors are red and blue. Bixby teams compete in the following sports:

- Band
- Baseball
- Boys basketball
- Girls basketball
- Cross country
- Football
- Boys golf
- Girls golf
- Boys tennis
- Girls tennis
- MCJROTC
- Boys soccer
- Girls soccer
- Softball
- Boys swimming
- Girls swimming
- Track and field
- Wrestling
- Volleyball

=== State championships ===
- Football
  - 2014 6A-II Oklahoma Secondary School Activities Association State Champions
  - 2015 OSSAA 6A-II State Champions
  - 2016 OSSAA 6A-II State Champions
  - 2018 OSSAA 6A-II State Champions
  - 2019 OSSAA 6A-II State Champions
  - 2020 OSSAA 6A-II State Champions
  - 2021 OSSAA 6A-II State Champions
  - 2022 OSSAA 6A-I State Champions
  - 2023 OSSAA 6A-I State Champions
  - 2024 OSSAA 6A-I State Champions
  - 2025 OSSAA 6A-I State Champions

== Demographics ==
Bixby High School enrolled 1,793 students during the 2018–19 school year. 1,258 were Caucasian, 192 were Hispanic, 175 were multiracial, 125 were American Indian/Alaskan Native, 24 were African American, and 19 were Asian.

For the 2025–26 school year, Bixby High School reported an enrollment of 2,499 students in grades 9–12, based on the October 1, 2025 enrollment count.

In 2024–25, the National Center for Education Statistics reported 2,405 students: 1,455 White, 375 Hispanic, 334 of two or more races, 97 American Indian or Alaska Native, 97 Asian, and 47 Black students. No students were reported in the Native Hawaiian or Pacific Islander category.

== Notable alumni ==
- Jake Bennett, professional baseball pitcher
- Cade Cavalli, first round selection in the 2020 MLB draft
- Chris Harris Jr., former NFL cornerback
- Luke Hasz, college football tight end for the Ole Miss Rebels
- Garry Porterfield, former NFL defensive end
- Brennan Presley, NFL wide receiver for the Los Angeles Rams
