= Baptist General Convention of Oklahoma =

Group of Baptist churches

- Formation: 1906
- Type: Religious organization
- Headquarters: Oklahoma City
- Location: Oklahoma, United States
- Official language: English
- Executive Director-Treasurer: Dr. Todd Fisher
- Website: https://www.oklahomabaptists.org

The Baptist General Convention of Oklahoma (BGCO), now known simply as Oklahoma Baptists, is a group of churches affiliated with the Southern Baptist Convention located in the U.S. state of Oklahoma. It is headquartered in Oklahoma City, Oklahoma. The convention is made up of 41 Baptist associations and around 1,750 churches as of 2020.

== Name ==
In 2019 the BGCO began operating under the name "Oklahoma Baptists," while retaining the legal name Baptist General Convention of Oklahoma. The stated mission of Oklahoma Baptists is to "encourage one another to advance the Gospel."

While rebranding in 2019, the convention also reorganized into two ministry groups, the Ministry Resource Group and the Ministry Partners Group. Through these groups, the convention provides services to Southern Baptist-affiliated churches throughout Oklahoma in over 30 different ministry efforts, including chaplaincy, childhood, student and collegiate ministries, disaster relief, senior and single adult ministries, as well as Hispanic and Native American focused ministries.

Falls Creek Baptist Conference Center is owned and operated by the convention. Oklahoma Baptist University is an affiliate ministry of the state convention.

Dr. Todd Fisher has served as the Executive Director-Treasurer since taking office in 2022.

The BGCO is funded through donations from Oklahoma Southern Baptists giving through their churches to the Cooperative Program, the Edna McMillian State Mission Offering, as well as gifts and endowments from individual donors.

== History ==
The BGCO is the successor of the Baptist General Convention of Indian Territory, which held its last session at the First Baptist Church of Shawnee on November 9, 1906 (one year before Oklahoma statehood). On the same day, the Oklahoma Baptist State Convention held its final session at the First Methodist Church of Shawnee. At a prearranged time, the two conventions then met, formed a line, marched two-by-two to the Shawnee Opera House and formed the Baptist General Convention of the State of Oklahoma, representing 882 churches and 40 617 members at that time. The convention continued dual alignment with both the Northern and Southern Baptist Convention until 1914 when it voted "single alignment" with the Southern Baptist Convention.

Prior to Fisher, Dr. D. Hance Dilbeck Jr. served as the Executive Director-Treasurer from 2018–21. Nine Executive Directors have given leadership to the convention since 1906, beginning with J. C. Stalcup.

== Affiliated organizations ==
- Southern Baptist Convention
- Baptist Messenger
- Baptist Village Communities
- Oklahoma Baptist Homes for Children
- Falls Creek Baptist Conference Center
