= Bixby Public Schools =

School district in Oklahoma

Bixby Public Schools is a public school district in Bixby, Oklahoma, a suburb south of Tulsa, Oklahoma. As of 2022, the K-12 district serves over 7,000 students and is made up of 9 schools:

- Central Elementary: Pre-K through 3rd Grade
- Central Intermediate: 4th Grade-6th Grade
- North Elementary: Pre-K through 3rd Grade
- North Intermediate: 4th Grade through 6th Grade
- East Elementary & Intermediate: Pre-K through Grade 6
- West Elementary & Intermediate: Pre-K through Grade 6
- Bixby Middle School: Grades 7 and 8
- 9th Grade Center
- Bixby High School: Grades 10 through 12

As of 2017, the district's total High School enrollment (grades 9-12) is the 21st largest in the state of Oklahoma.

The district includes almost all of Bixby, all of Leonard, and portions of Broken Arrow, Jenks, and Tulsa.

== History ==
Rob Miller is scheduled to be superintendent until June 30, 2025, and he is taking retirement so he can campaign to become the superintendent of the Oklahoma Department of Education. Lydia Wilson is scheduled to become superintendent effective July 1, 2025.
