= Adele Collins =

Chickasaw painter from Oklahoma and New York (1908–1006)

- Born: Martha Adele Victor; January 24, 1908; Blanchard, Oklahoma
- Died: March 7, 1996 (aged 88); Blanchard, Oklahoma
- Citizenship: Chickasaw Nation, American
- Education: St. Elizabeth's Indian Boarding School
- Known for: painting
- Movement: Abstract Expressionism
- Spouse: Patrick Collins

Adele Collins (January 24, 1908 – March 7, 1996) was a 20th-century Native American painter. She was born in Blanchard, Oklahoma and was an enrolled citizen of the Chickasaw Nation with Choctaw and Irish descent. Collins moved fluidly between representational and abstraction in her paintings, depicting an array of events and themes combining her Chickasaw and Choctaw heritage with contemporary European modernist approaches. Rennard Strickland, law professor and curator, placed Adele Collins in the first wave of post-World War II Native American painters.

== Life ==
Collins (née Victor) was born in Blanchard, Oklahoma. Her family moved between homes in Blanchard and Lindsay, Oklahoma, during the early years of Collins's life. Her father, Emmett L. Victor (1875–1932), was Chickasaw and Choctaw, and her mother, Lee Desmond (1880–1954), was Irish-American. Both of Desmond's parents were allotted land in McClain County, Oklahoma. Her father used the family lands as a rancher and a farmer and gave Adele and her three siblings a prosperous childhood. Born two years after the closing of the Dawes Commission Chickasaw Rolls, Adele did not receive an allotment for herself.

Collins's Native American name was Puccanubbi, meaning "baby." Although she was not formally taught the Choctaw and Chickasaw languages growing up, she began to learn them later in life through researching Chickasaw and Native American history. Her parents taught her their family's history and encouraged her to take pride in their Native heritage.

Once Collins became old enough for school, her family took up residence in Lindsay, Oklahoma, where she attended public school until 6th grade. She attended Mount Saint Mary's Academy for 7th and 8th grade. Her family's income declined, and Collins moved to St. Elizabeth's Indian Boarding School in Purcell, Oklahoma from 9th through 12th grade. She graduated from St. Elizabeth's in 1926.

The Great Depression hit Collins's family hard, as they lost their family land and money. In 1932, her father died, leaving the family to cope with emotional and financial losses. Collins moved to Oklahoma City, Oklahoma, where she attended beauty college and received a degree to become a hairstylist. She then moved to Texas and worked in a suburb outside of Dallas for a couple of years, attending classes in drama and ballet for a brief period.

While working in Dallas, she met Patrick Collins (1901–1977). They married in 1934 in Yuma, Arizona. They were married for 43 years, until his death. The first year of their marriage was spent between New York City and Patrick's hometown of Chicago, Illinois. Over the course of their marriage, they frequently traveled, spending winters in Cuba, Florida, Canada, and Mexico. In 1947, they moved to Las Vegas, Nevada, for Patrick's work and lived there until 1974. The couple spent much of their time visiting the nearby pueblos and sites of historical and cultural significance. They also attended art shows in the area and traveled out to Tulsa, Oklahoma to attend the Philbrook Indian Annual. Collins credits her husband with introducing her to fine art as they traveled during their marriage to see art shows, museums, and concerts in New York, Chicago, Oklahoma, New Mexico, and other places. In 1974, the two moved to Oklahoma City as Patrick's health declined until his passing in 1977.

== Career ==
Collins began to pursue painting after she and her husband moved to Las Vegas. She started taking classes at the Art League in Las Vegas, enrolling in classes at the League for over eight years. There she took private lessons with Emalita Newton Terry, a 20th-century abstract and expressionist painter.

Through her mentorship with Emalita, Collins became interested in the emotional effects of abstraction in her work. She moved away from absolute realism, embracing painting that experimented with different levels of abstraction. Collins started painting landscapes through shape and form, with some of her works, such as Pueblo (1962, National Museum of the American Indian) becoming almost wholly abstracted.

As Collins moved through her career, she embraced aspects of realism in her portraits and historical depictions of Native American tales and mythology. Collins credits Jeanne Snodgrass King, a curator at the Philbrook, with inspiring her to embrace her Native American heritage within her paintings. Her portraits predominantly feature figures from the Five Civilized Tribes along with other tribe members located in Western Oklahoma and the Southwest. Collins utilized heightened color in her depictions of ceremonial themes, hoop dancers, and Chickasaw and Choctaw myths. Collins adapted modern European and American painting styles to her representations of modern-day American and Oklahoma Native Americans.

Collins's work was exhibited in galleries across the United States, including the Heard Museum in Phoenix, Arizona (1966); the McClean County Arts Center in Bloomington, Illinois (1991); and the Jacobson House Native Art Center in Norman, Oklahoma.

== Death ==
In the mid-1990s, Collins's health problems forced her to slow down in creating and exhibiting work. She died in Blanchard, Oklahoma on March 7, 1996.
