= Leonard, Oklahoma =

Leonard
- Unincorporated community
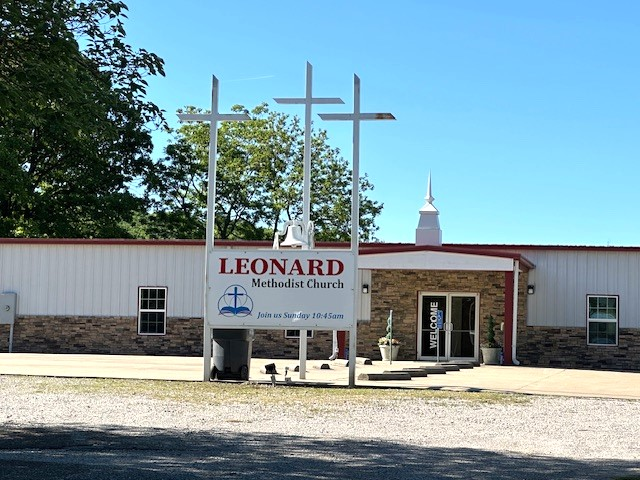
- A church in Leonard, OK, in May 2025

- Location within the state of Oklahoma Leonard (the United States)
- Coordinates: 35°55′13″N 95°47′58″W
- Country: United States
- State: Oklahoma
- County: Tulsa

Area
  - Total: 1.51 sq mi (3.91 km^{2})
  - Land: 1.51 sq mi (3.91 km^{2})
  - Water: 0 sq mi (0.00 km^{2})

Population (2020)
  - Total: 262
  - Density: 173.7/sq mi (67.06/km^{2})
- Time zone: UTC-6 (Central (CST))
  - Summer (DST): UTC-5 (CDT)
- FIPS code: 40-42500

Leonard is an unincorporated community in the southeastern corner of Tulsa County, Oklahoma, United States. As of the 2020 census, Leonard had a population of 262. It is located on U.S. Route 64 at the Wagoner County line. The town serves the surrounding farming area. It is notable for the presence of the nearby Leonard Geophysical Observatory, since closed.

== Demographics ==
Historical population
| Census | Pop. | Note | %± |
|---|---|---|---|
| 2010 | 200 | | — |
| 2020 | 262 | | 31.0% |
U.S. Decennial Census

=== 2020 census ===
As of the 2020 census, Leonard had a population of 262. The median age was 46.7 years. 22.1% of residents were under the age of 18 and 24.8% of residents were 65 years of age or older. For every 100 females there were 116.5 males, and for every 100 females age 18 and over there were 102.0 males age 18 and over.

0.0% of residents lived in urban areas, while 100.0% lived in rural areas.

There were 110 households in Leonard, of which 34.5% had children under the age of 18 living in them. Of all households, 56.4% were married-couple households, 26.4% were households with a male householder and no spouse or partner present, and 15.5% were households with a female householder and no spouse or partner present. About 25.5% of all households were made up of individuals and 9.1% had someone living alone who was 65 years of age or older.

There were 125 housing units, of which 12.0% were vacant. The homeowner vacancy rate was 6.7% and the rental vacancy rate was 0.0%.

Racial composition as of the 2020 census
| Race | Number | Percent |
|---|---|---|
| White | 187 | 71.4% |
| Black or African American | 2 | 0.8% |
| American Indian and Alaska Native | 29 | 11.1% |
| Asian | 0 | 0.0% |
| Native Hawaiian and Other Pacific Islander | 0 | 0.0% |
| Some other race | 5 | 1.9% |
| Two or more races | 39 | 14.9% |
| Hispanic or Latino (of any race) | 8 | 3.1% |

=== 2010 census ===
As of the 2010 census, Leonard had a population of 200.

== History ==
The post office was established August 22, 1908. by L.E. Reynolds and named for S. C. Leonard of Detroit, Michigan. Joe Randolph was the first postmaster.

== Education ==
It is in Bixby Public Schools school district.

== Leonard Geophysical Observatory ==
The Oklahoma Geological Survey's Leonard Geophysical Observatory is just south of Leonard. The Oklahoma Geological Survey has announced its decision to close the facility permanently. This facility was established in 1960, because it was "seismically quiet," making it a satisfactory place for monitoring underground nuclear tests. The facility had been built in 1960 by Jersey Production Company (a subsidiary of Standard Oil Company of New Jersey) for seismic research. Jersey Company gave it to Oklahoma University in 1965. A 160 acres (65 ha) site near Leonard was purchased by Sarkis Foundation and given to the State of Oklahoma. In 1978, the observatory became part of the Oklahoma Geological Survey. It was soon named the "Oklahoma Geological Survey Observatory."

Under the Threshold Test Ban Treaty, which President George H. W. Bush and Mikhil Gorbachev signed in 1990, the Russian Government was permitted to monitor American underground nuclear tests. Leonard was one of three locations that the Russians were allowed to use for this purpose. The Russians were allowed to build a seismograph station on leased ground adjacent to the OGSO, which they returned to Oklahoma after completing their mission seven years later.

The observatory employs a staff of two, and has been involved in monitoring earthquakes in the vicinity of Oklahoma since it opened. However, Austin Holland, state seismologist, has said that it is technologically obsolete and that the work can be done in the main OGS office at the OU campus in Norman. He added that the estimated cost to upgrade the Leonard facility is about $100,000. The state will close it during the summer of 2015, though the date has not been determined. The two staffers have been offered jobs in Norman, according to Holland.
