= Falls Creek Baptist Conference Center =

Coordinates: 34°25′32″N 97°06′43″W

Falls Creek Baptist Conference Center, also known simply as Falls Creek, is a conference center and youth camp along Falls Creek in the Arbuckle Mountains of Oklahoma. It is the state's oldest camp and is also the largest youth encampment in the United States and largest Christian camp in the world. While the center primarily serves members of the Baptist faith, attendees from other denominations use the facility as well. Falls Creek is owned and operated by the Baptist General Convention of Oklahoma (BGCO).

== History ==
Visitors explore Devil's Bathtub at Falls Creek

Falls Creek was established in the summer of 1917, when J.B. Rounds and W. D. Moorer used donated land to host the meeting of the Baptist Young People's Union, with a total of 273 campers. Since then, Falls Creek has grown astronomically, now averaging 55,000 attendees each summer. In the 1920s, a large outdoor tabernacle was built and remained in use for many years. In 2004, this tabernacle was torn down and construction began on a new one, with services during the 2005 and 2006 sessions being held at an amphitheater. Benches from the old tabernacle, which had been signed by generations of campers, were sold as collector's items. In 2007, the new tabernacle was opened at the 90th Falls Creek session and was the first facility indoors and with rest rooms. Former Rep. and now US Senator James Lankford (R-OK) was Program Director for Falls Creek between 1996 and 2009.

=== Geology ===
Falls Creek emanates from springs of the Arbuckle aquifer and flows over several waterfalls, the most notable being Price Falls, before dumping into the Washita River. The geologic formations surrounding Falls Creek have been dated to the Ordovician and contain many fossils of organisms that lived during that time. A large graben is present in the camp which contains the clastic materials of the Royer Dolomite which underwent karsting and was redeposited during the Pennsylvanian as the Collins Ranch Conglomerate.

=== Indian Falls Creek ===
Since 1947, Falls Creek has hosted a special annual gathering, called "Indian Falls Creek", of Native American Christians from Christian churches of all denominations across and outside of the United States, and from many churches residing within the state of Oklahoma. This weeklong camp session, which is the largest Indigenous Christian camp in North America, is aimed at families and focuses on topics and activities of particular interest to the various tribes, such as native crafts and language preservation through songs. It is chaired and directed by Native American pastors Bill Barnett and Victor Cope. An annual blood drive and bone marrow registry are also held at this time to increase contributions and minority representation to the repository to provide better matches for those in need, with the blood being stored at the Oklahoma Blood Institute.

=== Other ministries ===
Major League Baseball umpires Ted Barrett and Rob Drake, together with Reverend Dean Esskew, founded "Calling for Christ", an organization ministering to professional umpires. In 2001, Barrett and Drake were introduced to Esskew at a conference in Denver where Esskew told them about Falls Creek's facilities. They decided to hold their first retreat at Falls Creek and have returned for several years.

=== Death of Moses Fitchpatrick ===
In August 2010, a 20-year-old camper from Wichita, Kansas named Moses Fitchpatrick broke off from his hiking group and went missing. His body was found several days later, two miles south of the Falls Creek property, in rough terrain. The cause of death was undetermined, but likely to have been a result of heat and dehydration.

== Falls Creek, Oklahoma ==
Falls Creek is considered to be in Davis, Oklahoma for official matters, but many locals and attendees consider it to be an independent township or self-running town, complete with a post office and shops. It also has a lake and a natural spring.

Falls Creek, Oklahoma
- Unincorporated Community
- Interactive map of Falls Creek, Oklahoma
- Country: United States
- State: Oklahoma
- Counties: Murray
- Time zone: UTC-6 (Central (CST))
  - Summer (DST): UTC-5 (CDT)
- Area code: 580
- Website: https://www.fallscreek.org

Falls Creek is an unincorporated community in Murray county in the U.S. state of Oklahoma.

== Attractions ==
Falls Creek is the home of Falls Creek Baptist Conference Center. The former B. B. McKinney Chapel in Falls Creek was named in honor of Baylus Benjamin McKinney, the Louisiana native and Christian singer and composer of 149 gospel hymns. It was demolished in 2003-2004 for the construction of the new R.A. Young Tabernacle.

== Transportation ==
=== Roads and highways ===
Major highways are:

- U.S. Route 77D

== See also ==
- Native American religion
