= Blanchard News =

Newspaper in Oklahoma

The Blanchard News
- Type: Weekly newspaper
- Founder(s): G.W. "Bill" Van Wie
- Founded: 1946
- Headquarters: Blanchard, Oklahoma

The Blanchard News is a weekly newspaper published every Thursday in the town of Blanchard, Oklahoma.

== History ==
The newspaper was founded in 1946 by G.W. "Bill" Van Wie. In 1973, he sold the paper to Ross Coyle and Rollie Hyde, G.W. "Bill" Van Wie dies 16 years later.

Today, the Blanchard News, located 218 N Main St Blanchard, OK 73010, has approximately 20+ employs. The new paper sells for 75 cents per copy.
