= Wagoner Tribune =

- Type: Weekly newspaper
- Format: Tabloid
- Publisher: Jamey Honeycutt
- News editor: Travis Sloat
- Founded: 1901
- Language: English
- Headquarters: Wagoner, OK, U.S.
- Circulation: 2,050 (as of 2009)
- Website: wagonertribune.com

The Wagoner Tribune is a weekly newspaper in Wagoner, Oklahoma that publishes on Thursday. It is published by Community Publishers Inc., a newspaper and Internet publisher and commercial printer that serves Oklahoma, Missouri and Arkansas. The newspaper was established in 1901 and is currently edited by Travis Sloat.
