= Capitol Hill Beacon =

Newspaper in Oklahoma City, Oklahoma

- Type: Weekly newspaper
- Format: Broadsheet
- Owner: Choctaw Times LLC
- Editor: David Sellers
- Founded: 1905
- Headquarters: Oklahoma City, OK
- OCLC number: 34097403

The Capitol Hill Beacon was a paid distributed weekly newspaper headquartered in Oklahoma City, Oklahoma. It was founded in 1905. In February 2014, under new ownership, the paper changed its name to the Midwest City Beacon, and relocated from Capitol Hill to Midwest City. The publication remains a legal newspaper of Oklahoma County. Under the umbrella of Choctaw Times LLC, the sister papers of the Beacon are Choctaw Times, The Tuttle Times, Mustang Times, and Minco-Union City Times.
