= The Atoka County Times =

- Type: Weekly newspaper
- Format: Broadsheet
- Owner(s): Cookson Hill Publishing, Inc.
- Publisher: Louise Cain
- Founded: 1950; 75 years ago
- Language: English
- Headquarters: Oklahoma, U.S.
- Circulation: 4,200
- Website: atokacountytimes.com

The Atoka County Times is a weekly paper that has served Atoka County, Oklahoma since 1950. It is locally owned.

In October 2023, Lousie Cain sold the newspaper to Cookson Hill Publishing, Inc.
