= United States Senate Select Committee on Ethics =

U.S. government ethical oversight committee

Senate Ethics Committee
Select committee
- Active United States Senate; 119th Congress

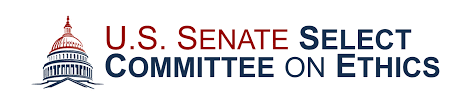

History
- Formed: February 2, 1977
- Succeeded: Select Committee on Standards and Conduct

Leadership
- Chair: James Lankford (R); Since January 3, 2025
- Vice Chair: Chris Coons (D); Since January 3, 2025

Structure
- Seats: 6 members
- Political parties: Majority (3): Republican (3); Minority (3): Democratic (3)

Jurisdiction
- Policy areas: Ethics
- House counterpart: United States House Committee on Ethics

Meeting place
- 220 Hart Senate Office Building; Washington, D.C.

Website
- ethics.senate.gov

Rules
- Ethics Committee Rules

The U.S. Senate Select Committee on Ethics is a select committee of the United States Senate charged with dealing with matters related to senatorial ethics. It is also commonly referred to as the Senate Ethics Committee. Senate rules require the Ethics Committee to be evenly divided between the Democrats and the Republicans, no matter who controls the Senate. However, the chair always comes from the majority party. The leading committee member of the minority party is referred to as the Vice Chair rather than the more common Ranking Member.

== History ==
The Senate Select Committee on Standards and Conduct was first convened in the 89th Congress (1965–66) and later replaced by the Senate Select Committee on Ethics in the 95th Congress (1977–78).

== Membership ==
Pursuant to Senate Rule 25, the committee is limited to six members, and is equally divided between Democrats and Republicans. This effectively means that either party can veto any action taken by the committee.

=== Members, 119th Congress ===
Majority	Minority
James Lankford, Oklahoma, Chair; Jim Risch, Idaho; Deb Fischer, Nebraska	Chris Coons, Delaware, Vice Chair; Brian Schatz, Hawaii; Jeanne Shaheen, New Hampshire

== Chairs ==
List of chairs of the Senate Select Committee on Ethics

Name	Party	State	Start	End
John Stennis	D	Mississippi	1965	1974
Howard Cannon	D	Nevada	1974	1977
Adlai Stevenson III	D	Illinois	1977	1980
Howell Heflin	D	Alabama	1980	1981
Malcolm Wallop	R	Wyoming	1981	1983
Ted Stevens	R	Alaska	1983	1985
Warren Rudman	R	New Hampshire	1985	1987
Howell Heflin	D	Alabama	1987	1992
Terry Sanford	D	North Carolina	1992	1993
Richard Bryan	D	Nevada	1993	1995
Mitch McConnell	R	Kentucky	1995	1997
Bob Smith	R	New Hampshire	1997	1999
Pat Roberts	R	Kansas	1999	2001
Harry Reid	D	Nevada	2001	2003
George Voinovich	R	Ohio	2003	2007
Barbara Boxer	D	California	2007	2015
Johnny Isakson	R	Georgia	2015	2019
James Lankford	R	Oklahoma	2019	2021
Chris Coons	D	Delaware	2021	2025
James Lankford	R	Oklahoma	2025	present

== Vice Chairs ==
Name	Party	State	Start	End
Wallace Bennett	R	Utah	1965	1975
Carl Curtis	R	Nebraska	1975	1977
Jack Schmitt	R	New Mexico	1977	1979
Malcolm Wallop	R	Wyoming	1979	1981
Howell Heflin	D	Alabama	1981	1987
Warren Rudman	R	New Hampshire	1987	1993
Mitch McConnell	R	Kentucky	1993	1995
Richard Bryan	D	Nevada	1995	1997
Harry Reid	D	Nevada	1997	2001
Pat Roberts	R	Kansas	2001	2003
Harry Reid	D	Nevada	2003	2005
Tim Johnson	D	South Dakota	2005	2007
John Cornyn	R	Texas	2007	2009
Johnny Isakson	R	Georgia	2009	2015
Barbara Boxer	D	California	2015	2017
Chris Coons	D	Delaware	2017	2021
James Lankford	R	Oklahoma	2021	2025
Chris Coons	D	Delaware	2025	present

== Historical committee rosters ==
=== 110th Congress ===
Majority	Minority
Barbara Boxer, California, Chair; Mark Pryor, Arkansas; Ken Salazar, Colorado	John Cornyn, Texas, Vice Chair; Pat Roberts, Kansas; Johnny Isakson, Georgia

=== 111th Congress ===
Majority	Minority
Barbara Boxer, California, Chair; Mark Pryor, Arkansas; Sherrod Brown, Ohio	Johnny Isakson, Georgia, Vice Chair; Pat Roberts, Kansas; Jim Risch, Idaho

=== 112th Congress ===
Majority	Minority
Barbara Boxer, California, Chair; Mark Pryor, Arkansas; Sherrod Brown, Ohio	Johnny Isakson, Georgia, Vice Chair; Pat Roberts, Kansas; Jim Risch, Idaho

Source: 2011 Congressional Record, Vol. 157, Page S557

=== 113th Congress ===
Majority	Minority
Barbara Boxer, California, Chair; Mark Pryor, Arkansas; Sherrod Brown, Ohio	Johnny Isakson, Georgia, Vice Chair; Pat Roberts, Kansas; Jim Risch, Idaho

Source: 2011 Congressional Record, Vol. 157, Page S557

=== 114th Congress ===
Majority	Minority
Johnny Isakson, Georgia, Chair; Pat Roberts, Kansas; Jim Risch, Idaho	Barbara Boxer, California, Vice Chair; Chris Coons, Delaware; Brian Schatz, Hawaii

Source: 2013 Congressional Record, Vol. 159, Page S296

=== 115th Congress ===
Members of the Senate Select Committee on Ethics, 115th Congress

Majority	Minority
Johnny Isakson, Georgia, Chair; Pat Roberts, Kansas; Jim Risch, Idaho	Chris Coons, Delaware, Vice Chair; Brian Schatz, Hawaii; Jeanne Shaheen, New Hampshire

=== 116th Congress ===
Majority	Minority
James Lankford, Oklahoma, Chair; Johnny Isakson, Georgia, Chair (served until December 19, 2019); Pat Roberts, Kansas; Jim Risch, Idaho	Chris Coons, Delaware, Vice Chair; Brian Schatz, Hawaii; Jeanne Shaheen, New Hampshire

=== 117th and 118th Congress ===
Majority	Minority
Chris Coons, Delaware, Chair; Brian Schatz, Hawaii; Jeanne Shaheen, New Hampshire	James Lankford, Oklahoma, Vice Chair; Jim Risch, Idaho; Deb Fischer, Nebraska

== See also ==
- List of United States Senate committees
- United States House Committee on Ethics
