= Yukon Review =

- Type: Twice weekly newspaper
- Format: Broadsheet
- Publisher: John Miller
- Founded: 1963
- Headquarters: Yukon, Oklahoma
- Circulation: 3,200
- Price: $39/annual
- Website: yukonreview.net

The Yukon Review is a twice-weekly central Oklahoma newspaper published Wednesday and Saturday and featuring community news and sports. Established in 1963, the newspaper is carrier-delivered and mailed to subscribers.

The Yukon Review began publishing in 1963 as successor to the Yukon Sun. The town had several previous newspapers; the Yukon Register, published from 1893, and the Yukon Weekly, from 1894, combined with the Yukon Sun in 1900. The newspaper was known as the Yukon Sun through 1962.

== Ownership ==
Retired pastor and businessman John Miller owned the newspaper from April 2008, and took over day-to-day operations as general manager in January 2015. Conrad Dudderar, who had been with the paper since May 1991, retired as news editor in June 2015. Star Communications purchased the Yukon Review on July 1, 2015. It acquired the Mustang News on February 1, 2016.

On January 6, 2018, The Yukon Review and Mustang News announced they had been acquired by Chisholm Trails LLC, a corporation made up of Yukon Businessman Scott Myrick, attorney and businessman Russell Mulinix and newspaper publisher John Settle.

Previous Yukon Review owners were Randel and Karen Grigsby, Jim and Betty Watson, and Conrad Dudderar.

== Mustang News ==
The Mustang News is a sister paper of the Yukon Review and was founded in 1982.

== Cease of Operations ==
Both the Yukon Review and Mustang News ceased operations March 27, 2022.
