= Chickasha Express Star =

Weekly newspaper in Chickasha, Oklahoma, US

- Type: Weekly newspaper
- Owner: Community Newspaper Holdings, Inc
- Publisher: Katherine Miller
- Editor: Paxson Haws
- Founded: May 1892
- Headquarters: Chickasha, Oklahoma, United States
- Website: chickashanews.com

The Chickasha Express Star is a Thursday weekly newspaper in Chickasha, Oklahoma. It is owned by Community Newspaper Holdings LLC.

== History ==
Founded in May 1892 as the Chickasha Express, the paper was originally a weekly but moved to daily publication in 1899. It was sold to the Donrey Newspaper chain in 1956. Historical archives are available at the Oklahoma Historical Society.
