= Skiatook Journal =

- Type: Weekly newspaper
- Format: Tabloid
- Publisher: Jamey Honeycutt
- News editor: Lindsey Renuard
- Language: English
- Headquarters: Skiatook, OK, U.S.
- Circulation: 2,600 (as of 2009)
- Website: skiatookjournal.com

The Skiatook is a weekly newspaper in Skiatook, Oklahoma that publishes on Friday. It is published by BH Media. The newspaper is currently edited by Lindsey Renuard.
