= Bixby Bulletin =

- Type: Weekly newspaper
- Format: Broadsheet
- Owner(s): Community Publishers, Inc.
- Founder(s): W. W. Stuckey; Paul Tyler
- Publisher: Mike Brown
- Editor: Jo-Ann Jennings
- Founded: February 24, 1905
- Ceased publication: July 31, 2014
- Circulation: 2,000
- OCLC number: 33481929
- Website: bixbybulletin.com

The Bixby Bulletin was a weekly broadsheet newspaper published in Bixby, Oklahoma, a suburb of Tulsa, from 1905 to 2014.

== History ==
The newspaper was founded by W.W. Stuckey and Paul Tyler, Its first issue, Volume 1, Number 1, was dated February 24, 1905. It was the oldest continuously operating business in Bixby, and had a circulation of about 2,000.

Community Publishers Inc., based in Bentonville, Arkansas, acquired the paper in 2005. In 2012, the Bulletin was combined with the Jenks Journal and Glenpool Post to form the South County Leader.

The South County Leader has ceased publication. The last edition was Volume 109, Number 23, dated July 31, 2014.
