= Coweta American =

Newspaper in Coweta, Oklahoma, US

- Type: Weekly newspaper
- Format: Tabloid
- Publisher: Jamey Honeycutt
- News editor: Christy Wheeland
- Founded: 1986
- Language: English
- Headquarters: Coweta, Oklahoma, U.S.
- Circulation: 2,600
- Website: cowetaamerican.com

The Coweta American is a weekly newspaper in Coweta, Oklahoma, that publishes on Friday. It is published by Community Publishers Inc., a newspaper and Internet publisher and commercial printer that serves Oklahoma, Missouri and Arkansas. The newspaper was established in 1986 and is edited by Christy Wheeland.
