= Oklahoma Baptist Homes for Children =

- Formation: 1903
- Tax ID no.: 73-1435473
- Legal status: 501(c)(3) nonprofit organization
- Headquarters: Oklahoma City, Oklahoma
- Services: To provide and maintain childcare facilities for dependent neglected and/or needy children of the state of Oklahoma in order to meet their spiritual, physical, mental, and emotional needs; and to help young women and men have hope and choose life in the midst of an unplanned pregnancy.
- President: Dr. James Swain
- Chairman: Mike Geiger
- Revenue: $17,899,757 (2021)
- Expenses: $12,645,958 (2021)
- Employees: 193 (2021)
- Website: www.obhc.org

Oklahoma Baptist Homes for Children (OBHC) is a nonprofit organization which aims to provide homes for children affected by abuse, abandonment, neglect, or poverty. Founded in 1903 as an orphan's home, the Baptist Homes for Children is a family-style residential care facility with eight children residing in cottages on four campuses across the state.

Public schools and local Southern Baptist churches assist in educational and religious goals. Houseparents provide a family atmosphere and training.

Oklahoma Baptist Homes for Children is the largest provider of private, not-for-profit, residential childcare in the state of Oklahoma, United States. The organization operates solely on private donations and contributions and does not accept any state or federal funding.

OBHC has four residential care campuses:

- Baptist Children's Home, Oklahoma City
- Boys Ranch Town, Edmond
- Baptist Children's Home, Owasso
- Baptist Home for Girls, Madill

Maternity/Parenting Services

- Program for single mothers

Hope Pregnancy Ministries OBHC offers seven crisis pregnancy centers; two in Oklahoma City, one in Edmond, one in Ardmore, one in Alva, one in Shawnee, and one in Tulsa.

Oklahoma Baptist Homes for Children is an affiliate corporation of the Baptist General Convention of Oklahoma.
