= Blanchard, Oklahoma =

- City
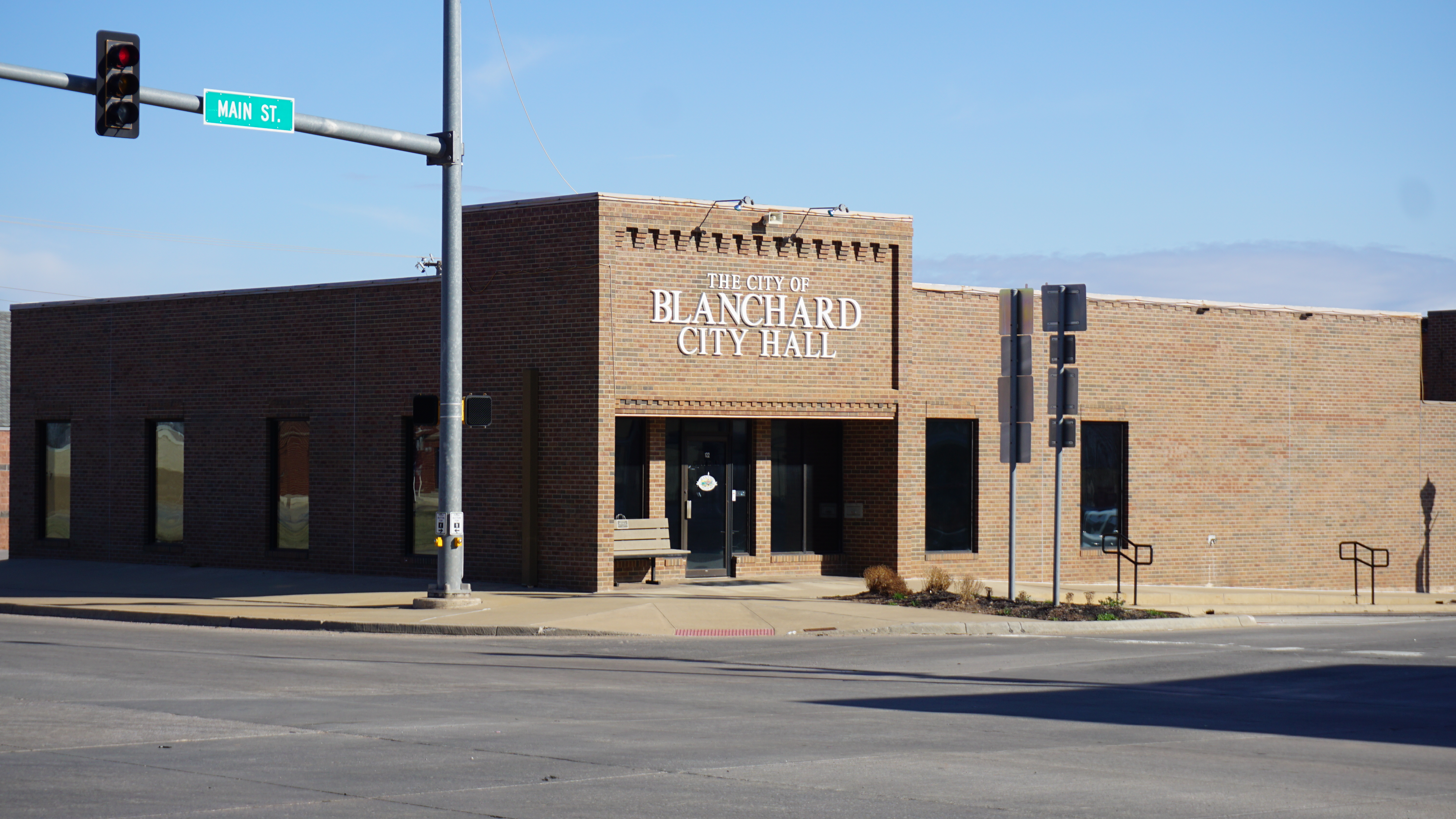
- Old City Hall

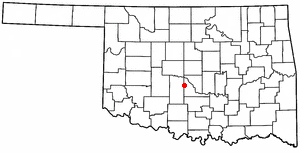
- Location in Oklahoma
- Coordinates: 35°09′09″N 97°39′37″W
- Country: United States
- State: Oklahoma
- Counties: McClain, Grady

Area
  - Total: 30.56 sq mi (79.14 km^{2})
  - Land: 30.44 sq mi (78.85 km^{2})
  - Water: 0.11 sq mi (0.29 km^{2})
- Elevation: 1,309 ft (399 m)

Population (2020)
  - Total: 8,879
  - Density: 291.7/sq mi (112.61/km^{2})
- Time zone: UTC-6 (Central (CST))
  - Summer (DST): UTC-5 (CDT)
- ZIP Codes: 73010 (Blanchard); 73065 (Newcastle)
- Area code: 405
- FIPS code: 40-06700
- GNIS feature ID: 2409861
- Website: cityofblanchard.us

Blanchard is a city in McClain and Grady counties in the U.S. state of Oklahoma. The population was 8,879 at the 2020 census, and an estimated 9,663 in 2023. Blanchard is part of a rapidly growing area of northern McClain and Grady counties known as the "Tri-City Area" with Newcastle and Tuttle.

== History ==
The center of Blanchard is situated in Township 8 North, Range 4 West, Section 30 in northwestern McClain County. Named after William G. "Bill" Blanchard, the community was organized originally by the Canadian Valley Construction Company, which also planned to build a railroad. However, the company went into bankruptcy, and the railroad came under the control of the Oklahoma Central Railroad which also experienced financial problems. The Atchison, Topeka and Santa Fe Railway took over and completed the line.

The townsite was established by three lot sales beginning with the Canadian Valley Construction Company sale on September 19, 1906. The second sale was held on July 18, 1907, and final lots were sold on March 25, 1908, by the Blanchard Townsite Company. Within a year the town was described as having forty business establishments, including a state and a national bank, four blacksmith shops, three livery barns, two grain elevators, and a weekly newspaper.

Several incorporation dates are reported in various publications about the history of Blanchard, and the town offices as well. The most reliable source seems to be the Blanchard Record of October 25, 1907, which reported, "That Blanchard is now an incorporated town is realized by but a few of our citizens. The petition praying for incorporation was favorably acted upon at the [federal] courts at Chidkasha [sic] last week. On or about November 19 notice of an election of officers will be given. In the meantime, candidates will be chosen." (Note: According to the Norman Transcript, when Blanchard celebrated its centennial, it offered Blanchard Centennial Collector's Belt Buckles for sale as souvenirs. The backs of the buckles were inscribed: "Blanchard was included in the new state of Oklahoma on November 17, 1907. W.G. Blanchard platted the town around the new railroad. The first train ran through on July 4, 1907, and the first building was the Santa Fe Depot. Cotton and corn were the two main crops.")

A population of 629 was reported by 1910, and 1,040 in 1930. The Blanchard post office charter was granted by the Post Office Department on December 19, 1906. Mail had previously been received at Womack. When Arthur H. "Art" and Bill Blanchard moved their store from Womack to the new townsite in 1906, they took the post office with them.

In 1909, the Northern District Court was established whereby McClain County was divided into two sections for legal matters for the convenience of the citizens. A courthouse was built in Blanchard, and the first case began on December 13, 1909. The district was disestablished in the late 1920s and combined with District One in Purcell, the county seat. At the turn of the 21st-century legal records could be found at Blanchard.

== Geography ==
Blanchard is located in northwestern McClain County. The city limits extend west into Grady County. It is bordered to the north and east by the city of Newcastle and to the southeast by the town of Cole.

According to the U.S. Census Bureau, Blanchard has a total area of 30.56 square miles (79.15 km^{2}), of which 30.44 square miles (78.84 km^{2}) are land and 0.11 square miles (0.28 km^{2}), or 0.36%, are water.

Highways include U.S. Route 62, U.S. Route 277, and Oklahoma State Highway 76. Chickasha is 18 miles (29 km) to the southwest, and Oklahoma City is 27 miles (43 km) to the north.

=== Climate ===
Climate data for Blanchard, Oklahoma (1991–2020 normals, extremes 1952–2021)
Month	Jan	Feb	Mar	Apr	May	Jun	Jul	Aug	Sep	Oct	Nov	Dec	Year
Record high °F (°C)	81 (27)	91 (33)	95 (35)	100 (38)	102 (39)	107 (42)	112 (44)	112 (44)	110 (43)	100 (38)	85 (29)	85 (29)	112 (44)
Mean daily maximum °F (°C)	52.5 (11.4)	56.8 (13.8)	65.7 (18.7)	74.1 (23.4)	81.2 (27.3)	89.2 (31.8)	95.1 (35.1)	94.8 (34.9)	86.7 (30.4)	76.0 (24.4)	63.6 (17.6)	53.2 (11.8)	74.1 (23.4)
Daily mean °F (°C)	39.7 (4.3)	43.7 (6.5)	52.3 (11.3)	60.7 (15.9)	69.3 (20.7)	77.6 (25.3)	82.8 (28.2)	81.9 (27.7)	74.0 (23.3)	62.6 (17.0)	50.8 (10.4)	41.5 (5.3)	61.4 (16.3)
Mean daily minimum °F (°C)	27.0 (−2.8)	30.5 (−0.8)	38.8 (3.8)	47.3 (8.5)	57.4 (14.1)	66.1 (18.9)	70.4 (21.3)	69.0 (20.6)	61.4 (16.3)	49.3 (9.6)	38.0 (3.3)	29.8 (−1.2)	48.7 (9.3)
Record low °F (°C)	−6 (−21)	−14 (−26)	4 (−16)	19 (−7)	33 (1)	44 (7)	53 (12)	50 (10)	36 (2)	18 (−8)	10 (−12)	−11 (−24)	−14 (−26)
Average precipitation inches (mm)	1.45 (37)	1.60 (41)	2.66 (68)	3.62 (92)	5.30 (135)	4.18 (106)	3.15 (80)	3.25 (83)	3.63 (92)	3.27 (83)	2.12 (54)	2.08 (53)	36.31 (922)
Average snowfall inches (cm)	2.0 (5.1)	0.7 (1.8)	0.5 (1.3)	0.0 (0.0)	0.0 (0.0)	0.0 (0.0)	0.0 (0.0)	0.0 (0.0)	0.0 (0.0)	0.0 (0.0)	0.5 (1.3)	2.5 (6.4)	6.2 (16)
Average precipitation days (≥ 0.01 in)	4.6	5.2	5.9	7.2	8.9	7.2	5.4	5.9	6.5	6.2	5.2	5.2	73.4
Average snowy days (≥ 0.1 in)	1.3	0.5	0.4	0.0	0.0	0.0	0.0	0.0	0.0	0.0	0.3	1.4	3.9
Source: NOAA

== Demographics ==
Historical population
Census	Pop.	Note	%±
1910	629		—
1920	842		33.9%
1930	1,040		23.5%
1940	1,139		9.5%
1950	1,311		15.1%
1960	1,377		5.0%
1970	1,580		14.7%
1980	1,688		6.8%
1990	1,922		13.9%
2000	2,816		46.5%
2010	7,670		172.4%
2020	8,879		15.8%
2023 (est.)	9,663		8.8%
U.S. Decennial Census

=== 2020 census ===
As of the 2020 census, Blanchard had a population of 8,879. The median age was 38.5 years. 26.9% of residents were under the age of 18 and 15.5% of residents were 65 years of age or older. For every 100 females there were 96.3 males, and for every 100 females age 18 and over there were 93.6 males age 18 and over.

<0.1% of residents lived in urban areas, while 100.0% lived in rural areas.

There were 3,227 households in Blanchard, of which 39.7% had children under the age of 18 living in them. Of all households, 65.0% were married-couple households, 12.0% were households with a male householder and no spouse or partner present, and 18.9% were households with a female householder and no spouse or partner present. About 17.7% of all households were made up of individuals and 8.1% had someone living alone who was 65 years of age or older.

There were 3,403 housing units, of which 5.2% were vacant. Among occupied housing units, 81.0% were owner-occupied and 19.0% were renter-occupied. The homeowner vacancy rate was 1.8% and the rental vacancy rate was 9.4%.

Racial composition as of the 2020 census
Race	Percent
White	80.7%
Black or African American	0.7%
American Indian and Alaska Native	4.8%
Asian	0.3%
Native Hawaiian and Other Pacific Islander	<0.1%
Some other race	1.4%
Two or more races	12.1%
Hispanic or Latino (of any race)	5.6%

=== 2023 estimate ===
As of the 2023 census, there were 9,276 people. The population density was 304.7 people per square mile. The racial makeup of the city was 83% White, 1% African American, 3% Native American, 0.0% Asian, 1% from other races, and 7% from two or more races. Hispanic or Latino of any race were 5% of the population. There was 3573 households. 81% of households were occupied by their owners. 27% of the homes are worth between $200,000 to $299,999.

In the city, the population was spread out, with 29% under the age of 18, 62% from 18 to 69, and 10% who were 70 years of age or older. 54% of the population is female. The Median Age is 38.6 (36.9 in Oklahoma). 9% of the population are veterans.

The median household income was $89,472. 6.7% of the population was below the poverty line, 7% under 18 years old.

== Education ==
Within McClain County, most areas are in the Blanchard Public Schools school district. One piece to the northwest is in the Bridge Creek Public Schools school district, and some pieces to the south are in the Dibble Public Schools school district.

Within Grady County, most areas are in Blanchard Public Schools, while some are in the Middleberg Public School school district.

Within the Blanchard School District, the elementary school is of recent construction and houses grades Pre-K through the second. There is also an intermediate school for third thru fifth grade and a middle school for sixth through eighth grades. Brady Barnes is the Superintendent for Blanchard Public Schools.

Blanchard High School is home to "The Lions" football team (class 4A) and has won 3 football state championships 2023 (class 4A), 2012(class 3A), and 1979 (class A). The athletic program also includes baseball won back to back State Championships in 1979 and 1980, and recently adding four more state titles in 2015, 2019 (39-0), 2022, and 2025. Softball won a state championship in 1984 and 2009, basketball, golf, cheerleading, powerlifting, and wrestling. The school also includes a successful Marching band program. The Marching band program is run by Jenn Kauffman.

=== Libraries ===
Blanchard is served by the Blanchard Public Library, which is part of the Pioneer Library System spanning many of the suburbs of Oklahoma City.

== Culture ==
=== Recreation ===
There are currently two parks in Blanchard as well as an athletic stadium and three nearby golf courses.

Annual festivals include "May Daze" in early May. Blanchard boasts one of the largest Veterans' Day Parades in Oklahoma around Veteran's Day. Blanchard built a new high school in 2011.

Blanchard has a new football stadium; the Oscar Brooks Stadium. Blanchard hosts a new Fine Arts Performance Center.

As of March 2023, Blanchard is constructing a veterans park and memorial. As of 2025, it has opened and is accepting public visitors.

=== Media ===
Residents of Blanchard and nearby Dibble are served by the weekly newspaper The Blanchard News. The radio station KKNG-FM is licensed to Blanchard by the Federal Communications Commission, although only the transmitter is located northeast of Blanchard, while the operating offices and studios are in Oklahoma City.

== Notable people ==
- Tony K. Burris, Medal of Honor recipient
- Adele Collins (Chickasaw, 1908–1996), visual artist
- Jody Miller, country and pop singer
- Bonnie Owens, country singer
