= Baptist Messenger =

The Baptist Messenger
- Type: Monthly magazine
- Format: Magazine
- Publisher: Baptist General Convention of Oklahoma
- Editor: Brian Hobbs
- Founded: 1912; 114 years ago
- Language: English
- Headquarters: 300 Johnny Bench Dr Ste 300, Oklahoma City, Oklahoma, 73104 USA
- Circulation: 39,158
- Website: baptistmessenger.com

The Baptist Messenger is the flagship news journal of Oklahoma Baptists, published continuously since 1912. The Messenger is distributed to approximately 40,000 households and has been called the third largest newspaper in Oklahoma in terms of print circulation.

Clarence P. Stealey moved to Oklahoma from West Virginia in 1909 to start the publication. The first edition of the newspaper coincided with the first annual meeting of the Oklahoma Southern Baptist Convention on May 12, 1912. The Baptist convention purchased the paper from Stealey for $5,000 in 1919.

== History ==
The first issue of the Baptist Messenger was published on May 15, 1912. The publication was owned and edited by Clarence P. Stealey, a minister from Washington, D.C. In 1919, the Baptist Convention of Oklahoma purchased the paper, which had a circulation of 5,000 at the time.

Stealey was removed as editor in the late 1920s after taking some controversial editorial positions in the antievolution movement. He was succeeded by Eugene C. Routh, who tripled the readership by the time he left in 1943.
