= Tinker Take Off =

Newspaper

Tinker Take-Off
- Type: Weekly newspaper
- Format: Broadsheet
- Publisher: The Journal Record
- Language: English
- Headquarters: Tinker Air Force Base
- OCLC number: 32617398
- Website: tinkertakeoff.com

Tinker Take-Off is a weekly newspaper created for publication on Tinker Air Force Base in Midwest City, Oklahoma and began publication in 1943. The newspaper was published in partnership with The Journal Record, a daily business newspaper based in Oklahoma City, Oklahoma.

== History ==
Tinker Take-Off changed their publication type from the traditional broadsheet newspaper format to a magazine format in 2019, as well as changing it to a biweekly newspaper instead of a weekly newspaper.

The publication paused publication in May 2020 during the COVID-19 pandemic.
