= Bixby, Oklahoma =

- City
- Logo
- Nickname: "The Garden Spot of Oklahoma"
- Motto: "A Community Of Choice"
- Location of within Tulsa County, and the state of Oklahoma

- Location in the United States
- Coordinates: 35°57′39″N 95°52′42″W
- Country: United States
- State: Oklahoma
- Counties: Tulsa, Wagoner

Government
  - Type: Council–manager
  - City manager: Jared Cottle

Area
  - Total: 26.76 sq mi (69.30 km^{2})
  - Land: 25.70 sq mi (66.57 km^{2})
  - Water: 1.05 sq mi (2.73 km^{2})
- Elevation: 600 ft (183 m)

Population (2020)
  - Total: 28,609
  - Density: 1,113.0/sq mi (429.73/km^{2})
- Time zone: UTC−6 (Central (CST))
  - Summer (DST): UTC−5 (CDT)
- ZIP code: 74008
- Area codes: 539/918
- FIPS code: 40-06400
- GNIS feature ID: 1090185
- Website: bixbyok.gov

Bixby is a city in Tulsa and Wagoner counties in the U.S. state of Oklahoma; it is a suburb of Tulsa. Its population was 28,609 at the 2020 census and 20,884 in the 2010 census, an increase of 36.99 percent In 2010, Bixby became the 19th largest city in Oklahoma. It is nicknamed "The Garden Spot of Oklahoma" for its rich agrarian heritage. Although it is one of the fastest-growing communities in Oklahoma, it remains a sod-growing center and a popular location for purchasing fresh vegetables. The per capita income of $36,257 is the highest in the Tulsa metropolitan area and is more than 50 percent higher than the state average.

== History ==
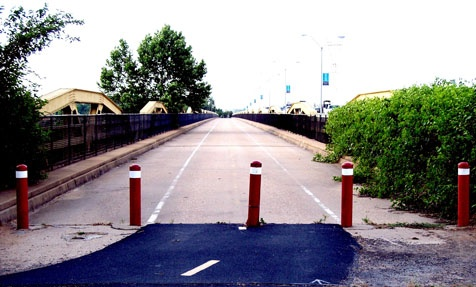
Adjacent to the new bridge, the old bridge across the Arkansas River serves as a track for joggers.

Alexander Posey, a member of the Muscogee (Creek) Nation, and his family settled in the area now known as Bixby in the late 1800s. He founded a community which was initially known as "Posey on Posey Creek." It included two saloons, a blacksmith shop, and a general store. The town became a government townsite with a post office in 1895. Located in the Muscogee (Creek) Nation, Indian Territory, Bixby was named in honor of Tams Bixby, a chairman of the Dawes Commission. The original 80-acre (32 ha) townsite plat was approved by the Dawes Commission in 1902. Many settlers were attracted to the area by the rich, though sometimes swampy river bottom land. In 1904 the Midland Valley Railroad named for Midland, Arkansas, laid tracks and built a depot about 1/2 mile north of the original town of Bixby. The railroad created factions that briefly split Bixby into two towns. The new part of town was deliberately surveyed so that the new streets did not align with the existing ones.

However, businesses in the original town soon moved to the new location and built permanent brick buildings there. Bixby incorporated as an independent, self-governing town in 1906, with a population of 400 and an area of 160 acres (0.25 mi^{2}). The first mayor, recorder and five aldermen were elected in February 1907. In 1911, a two-story brick schoolhouse was built on Main Street. Bixby Central Elementary is near the original site. A traffic bridge was built over the Arkansas River in 1911; for a time it was said to be the longest bridge west of the Mississippi River.

Fry, a community located north of the original townsite but later annexed by Bixby, served the surrounding trade area when the only way to get across the Arkansas River was by way of the Shellenberger Ferry. Fry's post office operated from 1896 until 1909. The Bixby Bulletin, the town's first newspaper, began publication in February 1905. It continued publication until 2005. A second paper, the Bixby Journal existed only from 1907 until 1910.

Bixby was impacted and enriched by the discovery of nearby natural gas deposits in 1905-1906 and oil fields in 1913, but farming remained the backbone of the community well into the 20th Century. Early farmers focused on production of cotton, wheat and alfalfa in the rich river bottom. During the 1930s, truck farming of vegetables slowly replaced those crops. In 1941, the city became an important regional center for shipping produce by railroads. At that time Bixby was christened with its nickname "The Garden Spot of Oklahoma," a designation still carried on the town seal and public vehicles. Cantaloupes, potatoes, radishes, squash, turnips, spinach, and sweet corn were shipped from Bixby to places across the U.S. In time the majority of the truck farms were converted to the production of sod, typically Bermuda grass, or developed for residential and other purposes. Only a small percentage of Bixby residents now work in agriculture, but the town continues to celebrate its earthy roots annually in June with the "Green Corn Festival."

Another point of history commemorated by Bixby is a visit to the area in 1832 by the famous American writer Washington Irving. Irving accompanied a U.S. Army exploration party on an excursion from Fort Gibson which is in the northern part of Fort Gibson, Oklahoma, west onto the prairie and the lands occupied by the Osage and Pawnee tribes. He described his adventure in his book A Tour on the Prairies (1835). He relates camping in a grove of large trees on the banks of the Arkansas River in what is present-day Bixby. The town has honored his visit by creating Washington Irving Park and Arboretum near the location. The park contains an amphitheatre stage patterned after the front facade of Irving's home, Sunnyside, in Tarrytown, New York, as well as gates near the park entrance which are replicas of ones at Irving's estate. A bronze statue of Washington Irving sits near the stage. Bixby Middle School drama students present a popular retelling of Irving's "The Legend of Sleepy Hollow" in the park each October. The park is also the location of the heavily attended "Bixby BBQ & Blues Festival" each May and the Bixby "Deutschesfest" in September.

In 2009, CNN Money.com placed Bixby No. 67 on its list of 100 Best Places to Live.

== Geography ==
Bixby is located at 35°57′39″N 95°52′42″W (35.960898, −95.878258). According to the United States Census Bureau, the city has a total area of 25.1 sq mi (65 km^{2}), of which 24 sq mi (62 km^{2}) is land and 1 sq mi (2.6 km^{2}) is water. The average elevation is 750 ft (230 m) above MSL. The town is bisected into north and south portions by the Arkansas River; the original town center is located south of the river.

== Demographics ==
Historical population
| Census | Pop. | Note | %± |
|---|---|---|---|
| 1900 | 283 | | — |
| 1910 | 384 | | 35.7% |
| 1920 | 1,249 | | 225.3% |
| 1930 | 1,251 | | 0.2% |
| 1940 | 1,291 | | 3.2% |
| 1950 | 1,517 | | 17.5% |
| 1960 | 1,711 | | 12.8% |
| 1970 | 3,973 | | 132.2% |
| 1980 | 6,969 | | 75.4% |
| 1990 | 9,502 | | 36.3% |
| 2000 | 13,336 | | 40.3% |
| 2010 | 20,884 | | 56.6% |
| 2020 | 28,609 | | 37.0% |

=== 2020 census ===
As of the 2020 census, Bixby had a population of 28,609. The median age was 37.0 years. 27.9% of residents were under the age of 18 and 14.9% of residents were 65 years of age or older. For every 100 females there were 95.7 males, and for every 100 females age 18 and over there were 91.5 males age 18 and over.

94.6% of residents lived in urban areas, while 5.4% lived in rural areas.

There were 10,443 households in Bixby, of which 40.6% had children under the age of 18 living in them. Of all households, 60.2% were married-couple households, 13.3% were households with a male householder and no spouse or partner present, and 21.8% were households with a female householder and no spouse or partner present. About 21.0% of all households were made up of individuals and 9.8% had someone living alone who was 65 years of age or older.

There were 11,043 housing units, of which 5.4% were vacant. Among occupied housing units, 74.0% were owner-occupied and 26.0% were renter-occupied. The homeowner vacancy rate was 2.1% and the rental vacancy rate was 7.9%.

Racial composition as of the 2020 census
| Race | Percent |
|---|---|
| White | 71.8% |
| Black or African American | 2.1% |
| American Indian and Alaska Native | 6.1% |
| Asian | 3.7% |
| Native Hawaiian and Other Pacific Islander | <0.1% |
| Some other race | 3.0% |
| Two or more races | 13.3% |
| Hispanic or Latino (of any race) | 7.9% |

=== 2010 census ===
As of the 2010 census, there were 20,884 people, 7,658 households, and 5,295 families residing in the city. The population density was 889.3 inhabitants per square mile (343.4/km^{2}). There were 8,187 housing units at an average density of 319.8 per square mile (123.5/km^{2}). The racial makeup of the city was 84.2% White, 1.6% African American, 5.9% Native American, 1.6% Asian, 0.01% Pacific Islander, 1.9% from other races, and 4.8% from two or more races. Hispanic or Latino of any race were 4.9% of the population.

There were 7,658 households, out of which 30.4% had children under the age of 18 living with them, 64.4% were married couples living together, 8.9% had a female householder with no husband present, and 22.6% were non-families. 19.2% of all households were made up of individuals, and 7.9% had someone living alone who was 65 years of age or older. The average household size was 2.72 and the average family size was 3.12.

In the city, the population was spread out with 28.8% under the age of 18, 7.9% from 18 to 24, 31.7% from 25 to 44, 21.8% from 45 to 64, and 9.8% who were 65 years of age or older. The median age was 34 years. For every 100 females, there were 98.3 males. For every 100 females age 18 and over, there were 95.2 males. The median income for a household in the city was $73,163 and the median income for a family was $85,000. The per capita income for the city was $37,368. About 5.5% of the total population were below the poverty line. Of the city's population over the age of 25, 37.8% hold a bachelor's degree or higher.

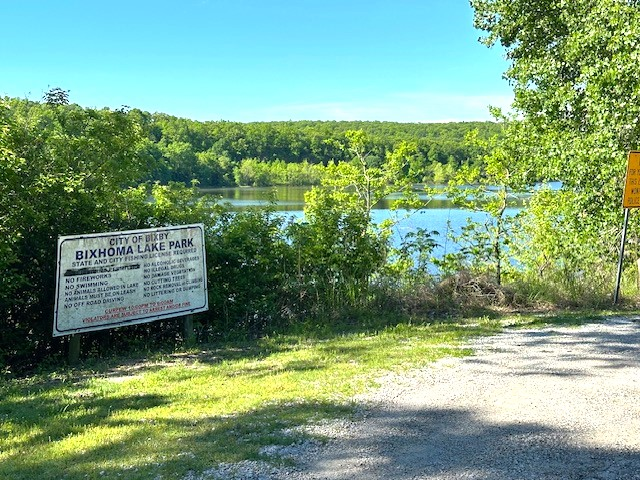
Bixby's Bixhoma Lake Park in May, 2025

== Points of interest ==
- Lake Bixhoma, a City of Bixby facility located about 5 miles southeast of town offering fishing and boating with purchase of a license.
- Washington Irving Memorial Park and Arboretum
- SpiritBank Event Center
- Plummer’s Service Station from 1921 in downtown Bixby, a restoration project of the Bixby Historical Society.

== Government ==
Bixby has a council/city manager form of government. As of 2022, the mayor is Brian Guthrie and the vice mayor is Paul Blair.

== Education ==
Bixby Public Schools are in the Bixby School District. There are nine schools in the district including Bixby High School, Bixby 9th Grade Center, Bixby Middle School for 7th through 8th, Bixby North Intermediate, Bixby Central Intermediate, Bixby East Intermediate, Bixby East Elementary, Bixby North Elementary, Bixby Central Elementary and upcoming Bixby West Intermediate and Elementary.

For the 2011 school year, there were approximately 5,000 students.

== Media ==
=== Newspaper ===
At one time Bixby had one newspaper, the Bixby Bulletin. The paper was published every Thursday. It was owned by Community Publishers, a newspaper and Internet publisher and commercial printer which served Oklahoma, Missouri, and Arkansas.

=== Television ===
Cox Communications Cable channel 24.3 is the Bixby Government-access television (GATV) cable TV municipal information channel. Among other things, it displays information about the city government, city council meeting, upcoming events, and general information about the city. The channel also features local sports and weather reports.

=== Communications ===
Bixby Telephone Company, commonly known as BTC Broadband, is a well-known company in the Bixby community and has been providing internet services since 1993 and telephone services since 1914. It is one of the first companies in Oklahoma to offer a gigabit connection over fiber optic cables to select neighborhoods. In addition to adding fiber optic support to existing neighborhoods, BTC Broadband is active in working with local developers to ensure select areas are pre-installed with fiber optic support.

== Cultural references ==
Bixby has been used as the setting for at least two popular works of fiction. The best-selling novel Tex (1979) by S.E. Hinton tells the story of its title character, a troubled teen in rural Bixby. The 1982 film adaption, starring Matt Dillon, was filmed on location and features the Bixby High School as well as various other locations around the town. The Midnighters trilogy (begun in 2004) by Scott Westerfeld is a supernatural story about a group of five Bixby High School students.

- Bixby, Oklahoma is the setting of Westerfeld's "Midnighters Trilogy", in which the location of Bixby on an exact point along the 36th parallel creates a secret hour at midnight where everyone is frozen, except for five teenagers born at the stroke of midnight.
- The majority of the movie Tex was shot in Bixby. The characters attend Bixby High School and drive through Bixby, as well as Tulsa.

== Notable people ==
Notable former or current residents of Bixby include:

- Jake Bennett, professional baseball pitcher
- Tanner Berryhill, professional racing driver
- Rodney Carrington, comedian
- Cade Cavalli, professional baseball pitcher
- Chris Cooper, hot rod artist known professionally as Coop
- Butch Davis, college football coach
- Roy Foster, professional baseball outfielder
- Chris Harris Jr., professional football cornerback
- Corey Kent, country music singer
- Barbara Starr Scott, Cherokee Nation tribal councilor
- Shane Stewart, professional racing driver
- "Cowboy" Bill Watts, professional wrestler
