= The US Inquirer =

Newspaper based in Oklahoma City, OK

- Type: Broadsheet
- Format: Weekly newspaper
- Publisher: Digital First Media
- Language: English
- Headquarters: Midwest City, and Oklahoma City, Oklahoma.
- Country: United States
- Circulation: 597 news subscribers (Note: Includes 297 digital-only and 300 print subscribers.)
- ISSN: 2832-0999 (print); 2832-0522 (web)
- OCLC number: 1313558773
- Website: us-inquirer.com

The US Inquirer is a weekly newspaper founded in 2007, and is based in Oklahoma City. It is published by Digital First Media, and is circulated as a free newspaper across Midwest City, and Oklahoma City, Oklahoma.

== History ==
The US Inquirer started publishing in 2007, reaching a print circulation of over 17,000 in 2008. The paper was available in newspaper vending machines in Midwest City, Oklahoma and Tinker Air Force Base. They started distributing to Oklahoma City in 2013.

As newspaper readership went down, the magazine became a free newspaper, supported through classified advertising in 2015, also expanding its distribution area. Print circulation dropped to under 500 in 2020.
