= Chickasaw Times =

Tribal Newspaper in Oklahoma

- Type: Monthly newspaper
- Format: Broadsheet
- Owner: Chickasaw Nation
- Founded: 1976; 50 years ago
- Headquarters: Ada, Oklahoma
- ISSN: 2837-5939 (print); 2837-5947 (web)
- OCLC number: 14584908
- Website: www.chickasawtimes.net

Chickasaw Times is the official newspaper of the Chickasaw Nation, and is headquartered in Ada, Oklahoma. Founded in 1976, it publishes news, cultural information, and official communications for Chickasaw citizens and communities.

== History ==
The origins of the Chickasaw Times go back to 1970, when Chickasaw Nation Governor Overton James created a tribal newsletter. The publication initially was a quarterly newsletter providing updates on tribal affairs.

The first edition of the Chickasaw Times was published on October 1, 1976. It expanded upon the earlier newsletter to provide broader coverage of Chickasaw Nation news and developments affecting Chickasaw citizens worldwide.

Over time, the publication became a communication platform for the tribe, covering tribal government activities, cultural heritage, community programs, and economic developments. Contributors have included tribal historians and writers documenting Chickasaw history and culture.

== Circulation ==
The Chickasaw Times is published monthly, with two additional special issues each year. It is mailed free of charge to registered Chickasaw voters, government offices, educational institutions.
