= List of U.S. state libraries and archives =

In the United States of America, sub-national governmental state library agencies established in each state have long been a catalyst for a great deal of the motivation for public library cooperation. This has been since the founding of the movement, starting in 1890 when Massachusetts created a state Board of Library Commissioners charged to help communities establish and improve public libraries. Over the years, state library agencies played a major role in encouraging larger units of service to provide library resources. The Library Services Act (1956) and the Library Services and Construction Act (1964) were keystones in the goal of providing library service throughout the nation.

In addition, many of the 50 states have state archives similar to the federal National Archives and Records Administration to keep records relating to information on state laws, census information, etc.

== Table ==
State	Library	Website	Archives (if separate)
Alabama	Alabama Public Library Service	Alabama Public Library Service	Alabama Department of Archives and History
Alaska	Alaska State Library	Alaska State Library	Alaska State Archives
Arizona	Arizona State Library	Arizona State Library, Archives and Public Records	
Arkansas	Arkansas State Library	Arkansas State Library	Arkansas State Archives
California	California State Library	California State Library	California State Archives
Colorado	Colorado State Library	Colorado State Library and Adult Education Office	Colorado State Archives
Connecticut	Connecticut State Library	Connecticut State Library	Connecticut State Archives (part of the State Library)
Delaware	Delaware Division of Libraries	Delaware Division of Libraries	Delaware Public Archives
Florida	Florida State Library	State Library and Archives of Florida	
Georgia	Georgia Public Library Service	Georgia Public Library Service	Georgia Archives
Hawaii	Hawaii State Library	Hawaii State Library	Hawaii State Archives
Idaho	Idaho Commission for Libraries	Idaho Commission for Libraries	Idaho State Historical Society Library and Archives
Illinois	Illinois State Library	Illinois State Library	Illinois State Archives
Indiana	Indiana State Library and Historical Bureau	Indiana State Library	Indiana Archives and Records Administration
Iowa	State Library of Iowa	State Library of Iowa	State Historical Society of Iowa, Archives and Records Program
Kansas	State Library of Kansas	State Library of Kansas	Kansas Historical Society
Kentucky	Kentucky Department for Libraries and Archives	Kentucky Department for Libraries and Archives	
Louisiana	State Library of Louisiana	State Library of Louisiana	Louisiana State Archive and Research Library
Maine	Maine State Library	Maine State Library	Maine State Archive
Maryland	Maryland State Library	Maryland State Library	Maryland State Archives
Massachusetts	State Library of Massachusetts	State Library of Massachusetts	Massachusetts Archives
Michigan	Library of Michigan	Library of Michigan	Archives of Michigan
Minnesota	Minnesota State Law Library		Minnesota Historical Society
Mississippi	Mississippi Library Commission	Mississippi Library Commission	Mississippi Department of Archives and History
Missouri	Missouri State Library	Missouri State Library	Missouri State Archives
Montana	Montana State Library	Montana State Library	Montana Historical Society Research Center
Nebraska	Nebraska Library Commission	Nebraska State Library	Library/Archives Division of the Nebraska State Historical Society
Nevada	Nevada State Library, Archives and Public Records	Nevada State Library, Archives and Public Records	
New Hampshire	New Hampshire State Library	New Hampshire State Library	New Hampshire Division of Archives and Records Management
New Jersey	New Jersey State Library	New Jersey State Library	New Jersey State Archives
New Mexico	New Mexico State Library	New Mexico State Library	New Mexico State Record Center and Archives
New York	New York State Library	New York State Library	New York State Archives
North Carolina	State Library of North Carolina	State Library of North Carolina	State Archives of North Carolina
North Dakota	North Dakota State Library	North Dakota State Library	North Dakota State Archives
Ohio	State Library of Ohio	State Library of Ohio	Ohio Historical Society Archives and Library
Oklahoma	Oklahoma Department of Libraries	Oklahoma Department of Libraries	Oklahoma State Archives and Records Management
Oregon	State Library of Oregon	State Library of Oregon	Oregon State Archives
Pennsylvania	State Library of Pennsylvania	State Library of Pennsylvania	Pennsylvania State Archives
Rhode Island	Rhode Island Office of Library and Information Services	Rhode Island Office of Library and Information Services	Rhode Island State Archives
South Carolina	South Carolina State Library	South Carolina State Library	South Carolina Department of Archives and History
South Dakota	South Dakota State Library	South Dakota State Library	South Dakota State Archives
Tennessee	Tennessee State Library and Archives	Tennessee State Library and Archives	
Texas	Texas State Library and Archives Commission	Texas State Library and Archives Commission	
Utah	Utah State Library	Utah State Library	Utah State Archives
Vermont	Vermont Department of Libraries	Vermont Department of Libraries	Vermont State Archives and Records Administration
Virginia	Library of Virginia	Library of Virginia	
Washington	Washington State Library	Washington State Library	Washington State Archives
West Virginia	West Virginia Library Commission	West Virginia Library Commission	West Virginia Archives and History
Wisconsin		Wisconsin Department of Public Instruction: Division for Libraries, Technology, and Community Learning	Wisconsin State Historical Society Archives
Wyoming	Wyoming State Library	Wyoming State Library	Wyoming State Archives

== See also ==
- Territorial libraries:
  - Feleti Barstow Public Library (American Samoa)
  - Guam Public Library System
  - State Library of the Commonwealth of the Northern Mariana Islands
  - Puerto Rico National Library
- List of libraries in the United States
