= Association for Rural & Small Libraries =

American non-profit organization

- Abbreviation: ARSL
- Formation: 2008
- Type: Non-profit, NGO
- Headquarters: Seattle, Washington
- Location: Seattle, Washington
- Region served: United States and Canada
- President: Sherry Scheline
- Vice-President/President Elect: Phillip Carter
- Staff: 7
- Website: https://www.arsl.org/

The Association for Rural & Small Libraries (ARSL) is a non-profit organization based in the United States that promotes libraries, especially libraries serving small and rural communities. The ASRL promotes the value of rural and small libraries, and provides resources and services for libraries in rural communities.

== History ==
=== Foundations of the Association, 1982–2007 ===
The oldest document on record for the ARSL indicates that the Association was established in 1982. Its founder was Dr. Bernard Vavrek, Director of the Center for the Study of Rural Librarianship (CSRL) at Clarion University in Pennsylvania. In its early years ARSL's membership consisted primarily of library and information science students, but eventually broadened to include librarians and library workers from rural and small libraries throughout the country.

=== National growth, 2007–2020 ===
ARSL was located at Clarion until 2007, when it moved away from the University to its new headquarters in Lexington, Kentucky. ARSL Board members held a meeting in January 2007 at Clarion to determine the new shape of ARSL. Discussions included enlarging the Board, revising the committee structure, and reviewing guiding documents as a foundation for future services. As a result of this meeting, the ARSL's strategic plan is updated annually to reflect member needs and remain relevant to the ARSL Mission and Objectives.

Also in January 2007, the group changed its name from the Association of Rural and Small Libraries to the Association for Rural and Small Libraries. This was to indicate that membership was open to people and organizations outside the immediate professional sphere of rural and small librarianship, as well as the Association's increased focus on providing professional development tools for the entire rural and small library community. In 2008 ARSL became an official American Library Association (ALA) Affiliate Organization. In 2017 ARSL headquarters were relocated to Whitehall, Michigan.

=== Evolving leadership, 2020–present ===
In September – November 2017, the Board of Directors issued a request for proposals to assess their organizational structure and make recommendations for improvements. This request followed growing concerns about the sustainability of the association in the face of rapid growth.

In May 2018 the ARSL Board retained Primary Source, a small agency in Washington state that provides consultation and services specifically for libraries and library-support organizations, to provide the requested analysis. Following Primary Source's analysis, the Board decided to realign its leadership structure to better serve the needs of the Association's members. In January 2020 the Board hired ARSL's first Executive Director, Kate Laughlin, to manage the administrative operations of the Association. The ARSL also moved its headquarters moved from Michigan to Seattle, Washington as part of this change. The Association adjusted its Board structure, decreasing it from 14 members to 9 (along with two ex-officio non-voting members) and replaced the generic Member at Large seats with four Regional Directors to ensure more nationally representative leadership. The Association delegated responsibility for policy development and program implementation to the major committees.

=== Presidents of ARSL, 2007/08–present ===
- 2007–2008 – Don Reynolds
- 2008–2009 – Patty Hector
- 2009–2010 – Timothy Owens
- 2010–2011 – Sonja Plummer-Morgan
- 2011–2012 – Becky Heil
- 2012–2013 – Andrea Berstler
- 2013–2014 – Tena Hanson
- 2014–2015 – Donna Brice
- 2015–2016 – Jet Kofoot
- 2016–2017 – Judy Calhoun
- 2017–2018 – Kieran Hixon
- 2018–2019 – Lisa Lewis
- 2019–2020 – Jennifer Pearson
- 2021 – Kathy Zappitello
- 2022 – Bailee Hutchinson
- 2023 – Jennie Garner
- 2024 – Patrick Bodily
- 2025 – John Clexton
- 2026 – Sherry Scheline
- 2027 – Tyler Hahn

== Membership ==
Membership in ARSL is open to any person or organization, but most of its members are libraries or librarians. These members are library staff, library board members, professional consultants, volunteers and library-related organizations. Members are primarily from the United States, but there are some international members.

== Governing structure ==
The ARSL is a 501(c)(3) non-profit entity, governed by a set of bylaws that are administered by a duly elected Board of directors. The 11 directors on the Board serve terms of up to three years with the ability to be re-elected once. The Executive Committee of the Board, composed of the Immediate Past President, President, Vice President, Secretary, and Treasurer, is empowered to administrate certain responsibilities. Policies and programs are managed by various committees.

=== Committees ===
ARSL is a volunteer-driven organization with the exception of some administrative functions.

==== Advocacy Committee ====
- Engages in regular advocacy efforts on behalf of ARSL and promotes individual advocacy opportunities to members. Oversees The ARSL Advocacy Center, which provides essential tools and resources to support advocacy for rural and small libraries, covering areas such as material challenges, connecting with legislators, and refining library policies.

==== Conference Committee ====
- Plans of ARSL's annual conference in cooperation with the ARSL administrative office. The committee's work includes recruitment of keynote speakers and presenters.

==== Continuing Education Committee ====
- Advises ARSL on the identification, development, and evaluation of relevant, cost-effective continuing education and career development opportunities that meet the needs and concerns of small and rural library professionals.

==== Finance Committee ====
- Creates ARSL's annual organization budget, which is reviewed and adopted by the Board of Directors. It also forecasts revenues and expenditures based on organizational strategic goals.

==== Governance Committee ====
- Revises and maintains the Association's governing documents, including its policies and bylaws. This committee meets as needed to review proposed revisions to those documents before submitting them to the ARSL Board for consideration.

==== Grants, Awards & Scholarships Committee ====
- Coordinates the selection of recipients of ARSL's conference scholarships, ARSL's annual awards for libraries and library workers, and any grants that are administered by ARSL.

==== Marketing & Communications Committee ====
- Curates the Association's public voice in print and on social media. The committee develops campaigns to promote the work of the Association and to attract new members.

==== Membership Committee ====
- Works to retain and engage current ARSL members, in communication with other ARSL committee leadership and in concert with the ARSL staff.

==== Sustainability Committee ====
- Advises on sustainable practices for ARSL and its member libraries. Supports the organization's strategic commitment to operational resilience through eco-conscious planning and equipping rural libraries with the tools and knowledge to adopt environmentally responsible operations in their own communities.

== Conferences ==
With a focus on practical workshops, presentations are geared toward the small and rural library audience. Prior to ARSL's formation, the Center for the Study of Rural Librarianship at Clarion University in Clarion, Pennsylvania sponsored conferences that were held throughout the US from 1990–1999. From 2001–2007, ARSL's annual conference was held in Columbus, Ohio, and depended heavily on the Center for the Study of Rural Librarianship for financial and logistical support.

From 2004–2006, conferences were held in conjunction with the Association for Bookmobile and Outreach Services (ABOS). In response to member requests and to provide greater access by more rural library participants, in 2007 the ARSL decided to hold the annual meeting and conference in different states and geographic regions. ARSL's conferences now rotate between the four ARSL regions (West, South, Midwest, and Northeast) on a four-year cycle.

As a result of the COVID-19 pandemic, the 2020 conference became ARSL's first fully-virtual conference. It was originally scheduled to be held in Wichita, Kansas.

=== Conference Locations and Partners ===
- 2008 – Sacramento, California | California State Library
- 2009 – Gatlinburg, Tennessee | Tennessee State Library and Archives
- 2010 – Denver, Colorado | Joint Conference with the Association for Bookmobile and Outreach Services (ABOS) | Colorado State Library, Colorado Library Consortium, Bibliographic Center for Research
- 2011 – Frisco, Texas | University of North Texas
- 2012 – Raleigh, North Carolina | State Library of North Carolina
- 2013 – Omaha, Nebraska | Nebraska Library Association and Iowa Small Library Association
- 2014 – Tacoma, Washington | Washington State Library
- 2015 – Little Rock, Arkansas | Arkansas Library Association
- 2016 – Fargo, North Dakota | North Dakota State Library and Minnesota Department of Education State Library Services
- 2017 – St. George, Utah | Utah State Library
- 2018 – Springfield, Illinois | Illinois State Library
- 2019 – Burlington, Vermont | State Library of Vermont
- 2020 – Virtual (previously Wichita, Kansas)
- 2021 – Reno/Sparks, Nevada
- 2022 – Chattanooga, Tennessee
- 2023 – Wichita, Kansas
- 2024 – Springfield, Massachusetts
- 2025 – Albuquerque, New Mexico
- 2026 – Montgomery, Alabama
- 2027 – Milwaukee, Wisconsin

== See also ==
- Library Bill of Rights
- Library Hall of Fame
- List of libraries in the United States
- Public library advocacy
