= Barbara Staggs =

American politician (1940–2014)

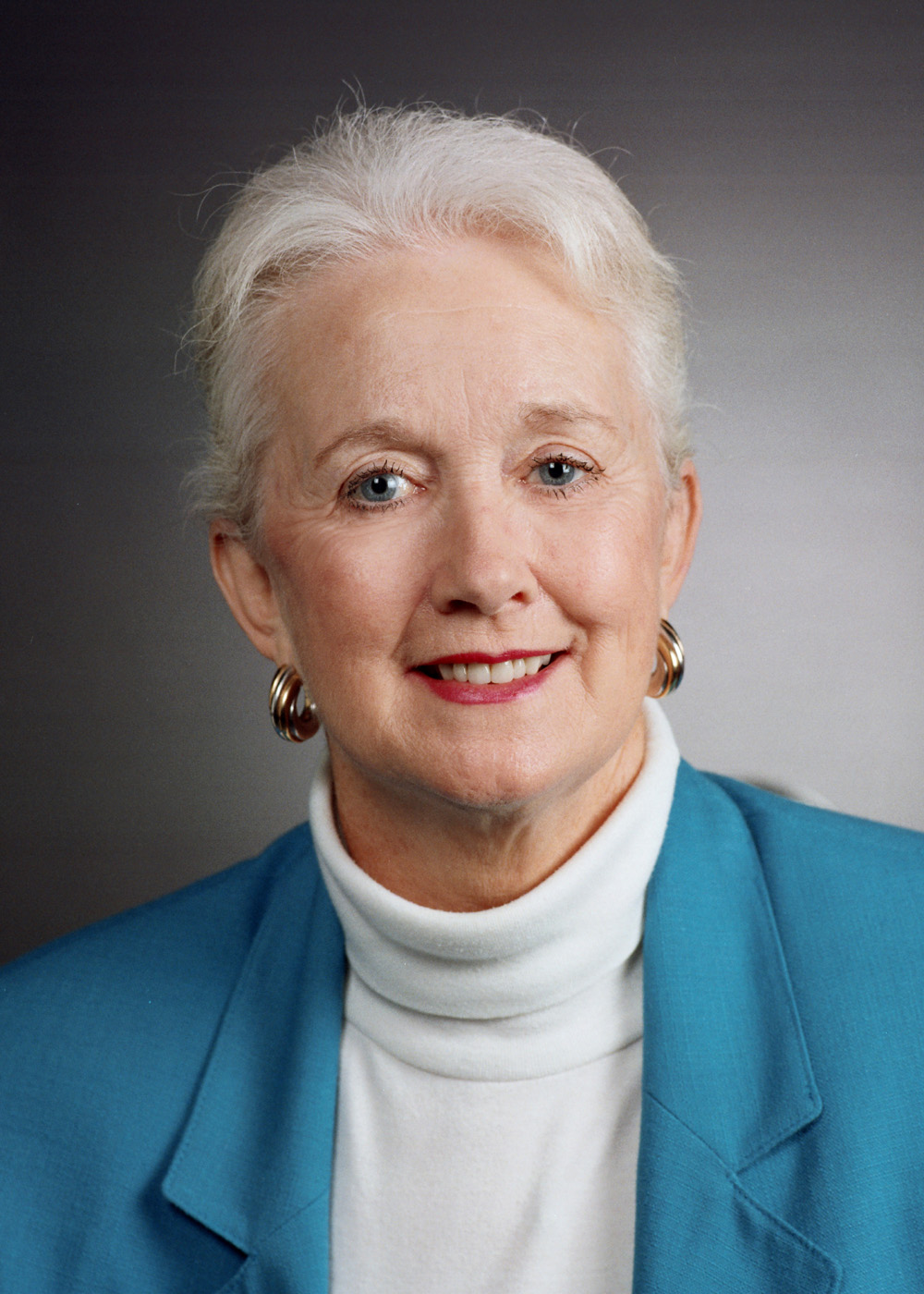

Member of the Oklahoma House of Representatives from the 14 district
- In office 1994–2006
- Preceded by: John Monks
- Succeeded by: George Faught

Personal details
- Born: Barbara Annette Masterson; July 18, 1940 Hulbert, Oklahoma
- Died: November 22, 2014 (aged 74) Tulsa, Oklahoma
- Party: Democratic Party
- Spouse: Ross Staggs
- Children: Rick and Matt Staggs
- Profession: Educator

Barbara Masterson Staggs (July 18, 1940 – November 22, 2014) was a longtime educator in Muskogee, Oklahoma and a legislator in the Oklahoma House of Representatives. During her time in the legislature, Staggs assisted as a member of the Common Education Committee and was integral in passing many bills, such as one that lead to the creation of the Oklahoma Music Hall of Fame in Muskogee.

Staggs earned a bachelor's degree in education from Northeastern State University and both a master's degree in English and a doctorate in education from the University of Tulsa. She worked as a classroom teacher for 15 years, then moved up in school administration until she became superintendent of public schools in Talequah, Oklahoma. After three years in Talequah, she decided to run for the legislature.

== Early life and education ==
Barbara Staggs was born in her grandmother's home in Hulbert, Oklahoma, in 1940 to parents Truman and Veleria Masterson. She was an only child and three weeks after her birth, was moved to and raised in Muskogee. Staggs graduated from Muskogee High School in 1958. She lived her entire life in Muskogee, other than a brief time she spent in Tahlequah, Oklahoma while she was serving as superintendent of the school district. In 1959, Barbara married Ross Staggs on August 29. She received her undergraduate degree in education from Northeastern State University in 1963. She received her master's degree in English and her doctorate in education from the University of Tulsa in 1968 and 1987 respectively.

== Career ==
After her education, Staggs taught in Muskogee for 15 years. During her time as a classroom educator, Staggs taught English, drama, speech, and broadcasting. After her time in the classroom, Staggs served as the assistant principal for six years and served as the principal for three years. She was the first female to hold the position of secondary principal in Muskogee. In 1990, Staggs started as the superintendent for Tahlequah public schools. Again, she was the first woman to hold this position and served until 1993 when she decided to run for office.

=== Legislative accomplishments ===
Her first term beginning in 1994, Staggs was the first female elected to the legislature in district 14. Some of her accomplishments in office include aiding in passing a bill that provided funding to the Oklahoma Department of Libraries as well as passing a bill that made it legal for persons with disabilities to hunt with a crossbow. Staggs helped with the creation of the Oklahoma Music Hall of Fame in Muskogee, OK as well as aided in the bill that made throwing objects off of an overpass a felony. She was strongly involved with education legislation and served on the Common Education Committee, and in other capacities. Staggs served for 12 years until her retirement in 2006.

== Service and volunteer work ==
After her retirement in 2007, Staggs was elected to the Chairmanship of Muskogee County Democrats and worked as a Northeastern State University representative. While in retirement, Staggs served her hometown in many facets, including volunteer work with the following organizations:

- Leadership Oklahoma
- Muskogee Morning Optimists
- Oklahoma Music Hall of Fame and Museum
- Five Civilized Tribes Museum
- Three Rivers Museum
- Muskogee Development Corporation
- NSU Alumni board
- Board of Directors of Southwest Educational Development Laboratory
- NAACP
- Port of Muskogee board
- Oklahoma Commission on the Status of Women
- Oklahoma Foundation for the Education of the Blind
- Noon Lions Club
- Service League of Muskogee
- Lakewood Girl Scouts
- Soroptimist
- CASA
- Women's Leadership Conference
- 2010 for Freshman Girls
