= ARSL =

ARSL may refer to:

- Armenian Sign Language
- Arylsulfatase L
- Association for Rural & Small Libraries
