= 2012 United States House of Representatives elections in Oklahoma =

- November 6, 2012

All 5 Oklahoma seats to the United States House of Representatives
	Majority party	Minority party
Party	Republican	Democratic
Last election	4	1
Seats won	5	0
Seat change	▲1	▼1
Popular vote	856,872	410,324
Percentage	64.62%	30.95%
Swing	▼0.88%	▲3.05%
- Republican 40–50% 50–60% 60–70% 70–80% 80–90%

The 2012 congressional elections in Oklahoma were held on November 6, 2012, to determine who would represent the state of Oklahoma in the United States House of Representatives. Oklahoma has five seats in the House, apportioned according to the 2010 United States census. Representatives are elected for two-year terms; those elected will serve in the 113th Congress from January 3, 2013, until January 3, 2015.

== Redistricting ==
A redistricting bill which made only minor alterations to the state's congressional districts was signed into law by Governor Mary Fallin on May 10, 2011. The new map was approved by every member of the congressional delegation.

== Overview ==
United States House of Representatives elections in Oklahoma, 2012
Party	Votes	Percentage	Seats before	Seats after	+/–
Republican	856,872	64.62	4	5	+1
Democratic	410,324	30.95	1	0	-1
Independent	48,169	3.63	0	0	0
Modern Whig	5,394	0.41	0	0	0
Libertarian	5,176	0.39	0	0	0
Totals	1,325,935	100.00%	5	5	±0
Voter turnout					

== District 1 ==
2012 Oklahoma's 1st congressional district election
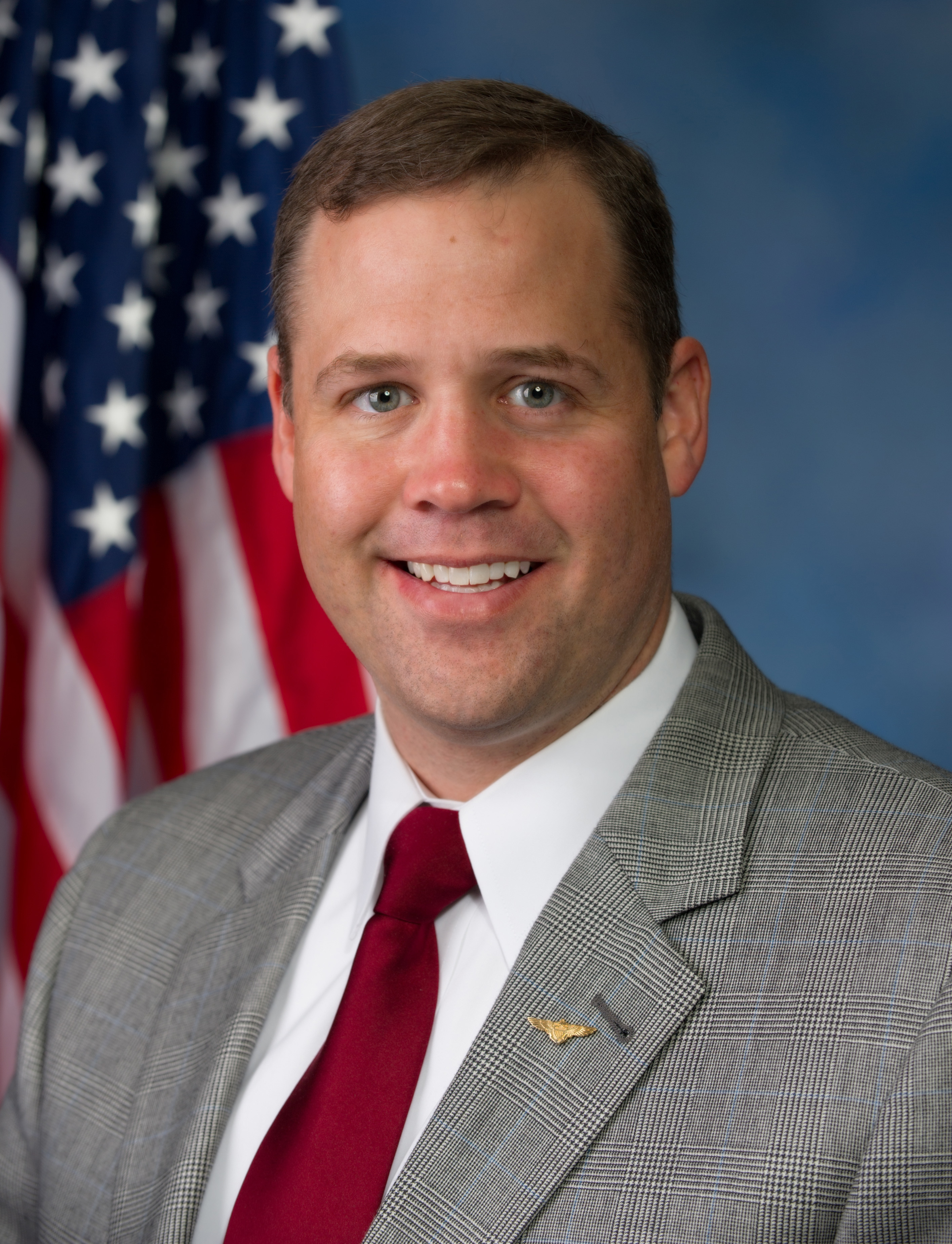

Nominee	Jim Bridenstine	John Olson
Party	Republican	Democratic
Popular vote	181,084	91,421
Percentage	63.5%	32.0%
- Precinct and county-level results Bridenstine: 40–50% 50–60% 60–70% 70–80% 80–90% 90–100% Olson: 40–50% 50–60% 60–70% 70–80% 80–90% 90–100%
U.S. Representative before election
John A. Sullivan
Republican
Elected U.S. Representative
Jim Bridenstine
Republican

In redistricting, parts of Rogers County, including suburbs east of Tulsa, were moved from the 1st district to the 2nd. Republican John Sullivan, who has represented the 1st district since 2002, will seek re-election.

=== Republican primary ===
==== Candidates ====
===== Nominee =====
- Jim Bridenstine, U.S. Navy combat pilot

===== Eliminated in primary =====
- John Sullivan, incumbent U.S. Representative

===== Declined =====
- Randy Brogdon, state senator

==== Endorsements ====
John Sullivan

Organizations

- Americans for Legal Immigration

==== Results ====
Republican primary results
Party	Candidate	Votes	%
Republican	Jim Bridenstine	28,055	53.8
Republican	John Sullivan (incumbent)	24,058	46.2
Total votes		52,113	100.0

=== Democratic primary ===
==== Candidates ====
===== Nominee =====
- John Olson, businessman and Army reservist

=== General election ===
==== Endorsements ====
Jim Bridenstine (R)

Organizations

- Gun Owners of America
- National Right to Life Committee
- United States Chamber of Commerce
John Olson (D)

Labor unions

- National Education Association

==== Polling ====
Poll source	Date(s) administered	Sample size	Margin of error	Jim Bridenstine (R)	John Olson (D)	Craig Allen (I)	Undecided
Cole Hargrave Snodgrass (R-Bridenstine)	August 28–30, 2012	300	±5.6%	50%	21%	6%	23%

==== Predictions ====
Source	Ranking	As of
The Cook Political Report	Safe R	November 5, 2012
Rothenberg	Safe R	November 2, 2012
Roll Call	Safe R	November 4, 2012
Sabato's Crystal Ball	Safe R	November 5, 2012
NY Times	Safe R	November 4, 2012
RCP	Safe R	November 4, 2012
The Hill	Safe R	November 4, 2012

==== Results ====
Oklahoma's 1st congressional district, 2012
Party	Candidate	Votes	%
Republican	Jim Bridenstine	181,084	63.5
Democratic	John Olson	91,421	32.0
Independent	Craig Allen	12,807	4.5
Total votes		285,312	100.0
Republican hold			

== District 2 ==
2012 Oklahoma's 2nd congressional district election
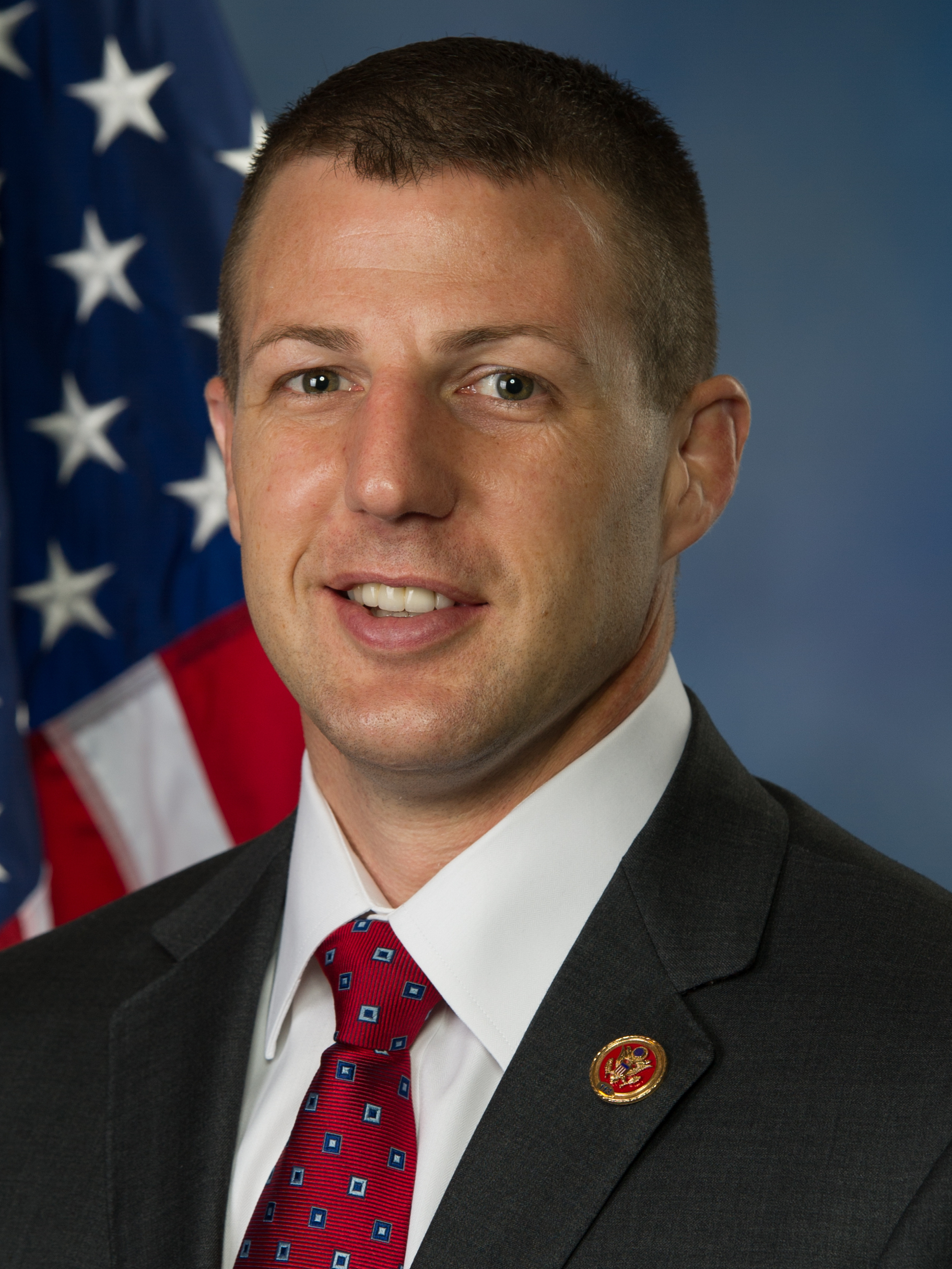

Nominee	Markwayne Mullin	Rob Wallace
Party	Republican	Democratic
Popular vote	143,701	96,081
Percentage	57.3%	38.3%
- Precinct and county-level results Mullin: 40–50% 50–60% 60–70% 70–80% 80–90% Wallace: 40–50% 50–60% 60–70% 70–80% 80–90% No votes
U.S. Representative before election
Dan Boren
Democratic
Elected U.S. Representative
Markwayne Mullin
Republican

In redistricting, the 2nd district acquired conservative parts of Rogers County and Democratic-leaning parts of Marshall County. Democrat Dan Boren, who represented the 2nd district since 2005, did not seek re-election.

=== Democratic primary ===
==== Candidates ====
===== Nominee =====
- Rob Wallace, former district attorney and assistant U.S. Attorney

===== Eliminated in primary =====
- Earl E. Everett
- Wayne Herriman, businessman

===== Withdrawn =====
- Brad Carson, former U.S. Representative

===== Declined =====
- Dan Boren, incumbent U.S. Representative
- Kenneth Corn, former state senator
- Jim Wilson, state senator

==== Results ====
Democratic primary results
Party	Candidate	Votes	%
Democratic	Rob Wallace	31,793	46.1
Democratic	Wayne Herriman	28,632	41.6
Democratic	Earl E. Everett	8,484	12.3
Total votes		68,909	100.0

==== Runoff results ====
Democratic primary runoff results
Party	Candidate	Votes	%
Democratic	Rob Wallace	25,105	57.0
Democratic	Wayne Herriman	18,926	43.0
Total votes		44,031	100.0

=== Republican primary ===
==== Candidates ====
===== Nominee =====
- Markwayne Mullin, plumbing company owner

===== Eliminated in primary =====
- George Faught, state representative
- Dustin Rowe, former Tishomingo mayor
- Wayne Pettigrew, former state representative
- Dwayne Thompson, pastor
- Dakota Wood, retired Marine Corps lieutenant colonel

===== Declined =====
- Josh Brecheen, state senator
- Randy Brogdon, state senator
- Tad Jones, former state representative
- Charles Thompson, veterinarian and nominee for this seat in 2010

==== Endorsements ====
George Faught

Organizations

- Eagle Forum
Dakota Wood

Organizations

- Iraq Veterans for Congress

==== Results ====
Republican primary results
Party	Candidate	Votes	%
Republican	Markwayne Mullin	12,008	42.4
Republican	George Faught	6,582	23.2
Republican	Dakota Wood	3,479	12.3
Republican	Dustin Rowe	2,871	10.1
Republican	Wayne Pettigrew	2,479	8.8
Republican	Dwayne Thompson	901	3.2
Total votes		28,320	100.0

==== Runoff results ====
Republican primary runoff results
Party	Candidate	Votes	%
Republican	Markwayne Mullin	12,059	56.8
Republican	George Faught	9,167	43.2
Total votes		21,226	100.0

=== General election ===
==== Endorsements ====
Rob Wallace (D)

Labor unions

- National Association of Letter Carriers
- National Education Association
- United Steelworkers

Organizations

- Blue Dog Coalition
Markwayne Mullin (R)

Organizations

- National Republican Congressional Committee "Young Guns" Program
- National Right to Life Committee
- United States Chamber of Commerce

==== Polling ====
Poll source	Date(s) administered	Sample size	Margin of error	Rob Wallace (D)	Markwayne Mullin (R)	Undecided
SoonerPoll	October 25–31, 2012	300	±5.66%	33%	45%	18%

Hypothetical polling

Poll source	Date(s) administered	Sample size	Margin of error	Kenneth Corn (D)	George Faught (R)	Other	Undecided
Public Policy Polling	June 8–10, 2011	1,074	± 3.0%	37%	36%	—	27%

==== Predictions ====
Source	Ranking	As of
The Cook Political Report	Likely R (flip)	November 5, 2012
Rothenberg	Safe R (flip)	November 2, 2012
Roll Call	Likely R (flip)	November 4, 2012
Sabato's Crystal Ball	Lean R (flip)	November 5, 2012
NY Times	Safe R (flip)	November 4, 2012
RCP	Likely R (flip)	November 4, 2012
The Hill	Lean R (flip)	November 4, 2012

==== Results ====
Oklahoma's 2nd congressional district, 2012
Party	Candidate	Votes	%
Republican	Markwayne Mullin	143,701	57.3
Democratic	Rob Wallace	96,081	38.3
Independent	Michael G. Fulks	10,830	4.3
Total votes		250,612	100.0
Republican gain from Democratic			

== District 3 ==
2012 Oklahoma's 3rd congressional district election
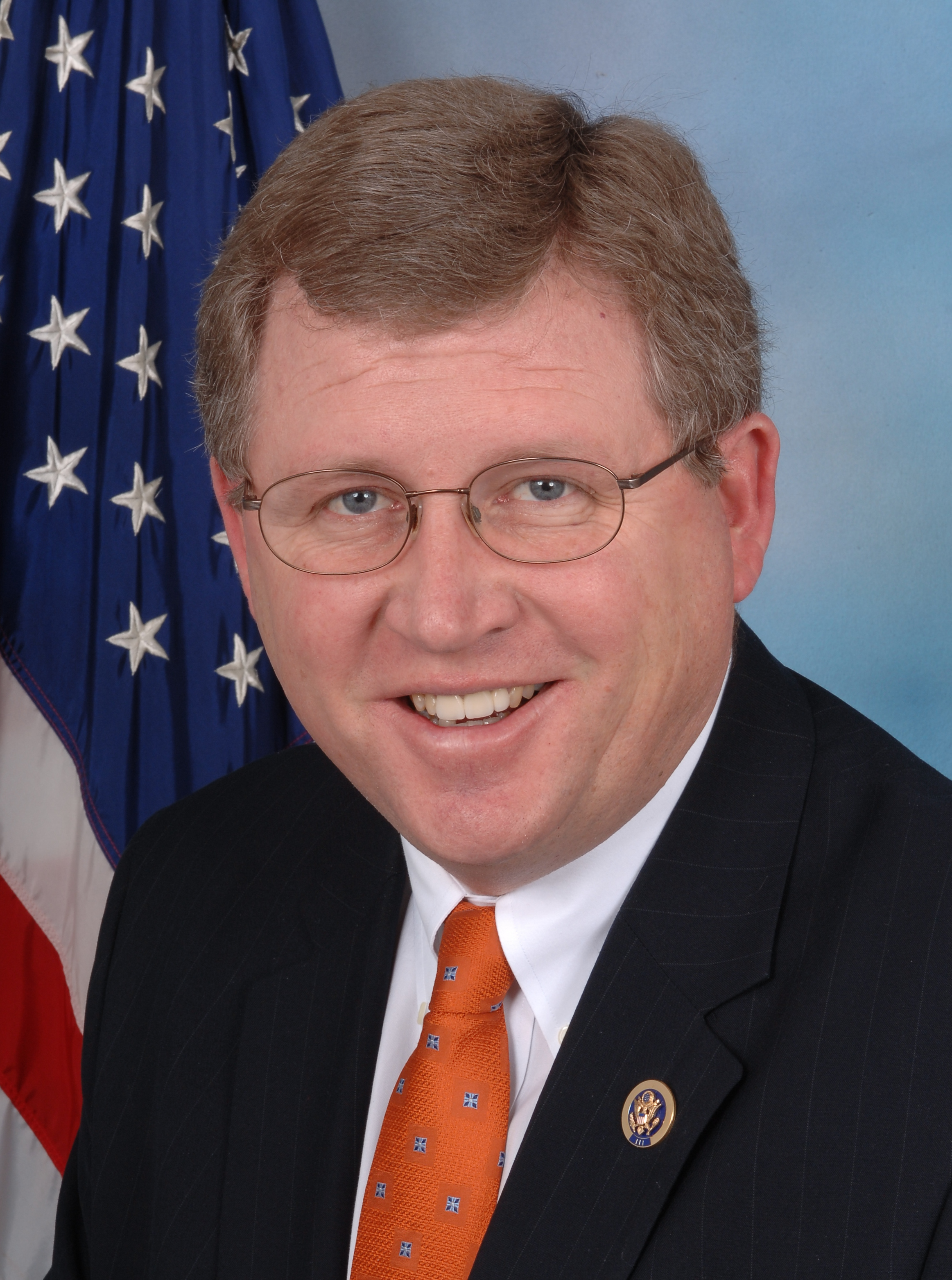

Nominee	Frank Lucas	Timothy Ray Murray
Party	Republican	Democratic
Popular vote	201,744	53,472
Percentage	75.3%	20.0%
- Precinct and county-level results Lucas: 40–50% 50–60% 60–70% 70–80% 80–90% 90–100% Murray: 40–50% 50–60% 70–80% 80–90% 90–100%
U.S. Representative before election
Frank Lucas
Republican
Elected U.S. Representative
Frank Lucas
Republican

In redistricting, the 3rd district expanded to include parts of Canadian County and Creek County. Republican Frank Lucas has represented the 3rd district since 1994.

=== Republican primary ===
==== Candidates ====
===== Nominee =====
- Frank Lucas, incumbent U.S. Representative

===== Eliminated in primary =====
- William Craig Stump

==== Results ====
Republican primary results
Party	Candidate	Votes	%
Republican	Frank Lucas (incumbent)	33,454	88.2
Republican	William Craig Stump	4,492	11.8
Total votes		37,946	100.0

=== Democratic primary ===
==== Candidates ====
===== Nominee =====
- Timothy Ray Murray, business consultant

===== Eliminated in primary =====
- Frankie Robbins

==== Results ====
Democratic Primary results
Party	Candidate	Votes	%
Democratic	Timothy Ray Murray	9,252	52.3
Democratic	Frankie Robbins	8,429	47.7
Total votes		17,681	100.0

=== General election ===
==== Endorsements ====
Frank Lucas (R)

Organizations

- Americans for Legal Immigration
- Campaign for Working Families
- NRA Political Victory Fund
- National Right to Life Committee
- United States Chamber of Commerce

==== Predictions ====
Source	Ranking	As of
The Cook Political Report	Safe R	November 5, 2012
Rothenberg	Safe R	November 2, 2012
Roll Call	Safe R	November 4, 2012
Sabato's Crystal Ball	Safe R	November 5, 2012
NY Times	Safe R	November 4, 2012
RCP	Safe R	November 4, 2012
The Hill	Safe R	November 4, 2012

==== Results ====
Oklahoma's 3rd congressional district, 2012
Party	Candidate	Votes	%
Republican	Frank Lucas (incumbent)	201,744	75.3
Democratic	Timothy Ray Murray	53,472	20.0
Independent	William M. Sanders	12,787	4.8
Total votes		268,003	100.0
Republican hold			

== District 4 ==
2012 Oklahoma's 4th congressional district election
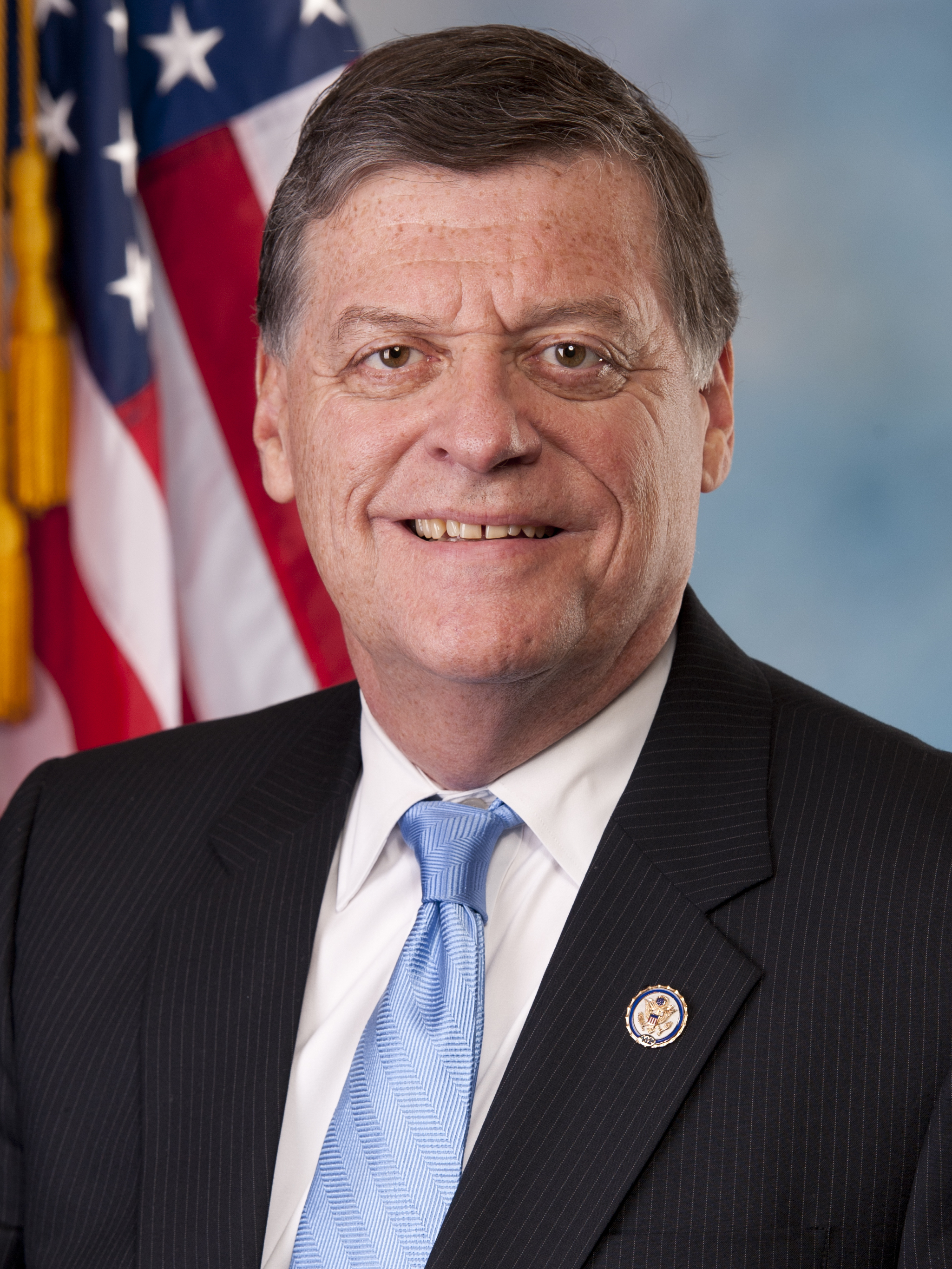

Nominee	Tom Cole	Donna Marie Bebo
Party	Republican	Democratic
Popular vote	176,740	71,846
Percentage	67.9%	27.6%
- Precinct and county-level results Cole: 40–50% 50–60% 60–70% 70–80% 80–90% 90–100% Bebo: 40–50% 50–60% 60–70% 70–80% 80–90% No votes
U.S. Representative before election
Tom Cole
Republican
Elected U.S. Representative
Tom Cole
Republican

Over the decade leading up to the 2010 Census, the 4th district had grown in population more than any other district in Oklahoma. As a result, parts of Canadian County, Cleveland County and Marshall County were moved out of the 4th district in redistricting. Republican Tom Cole has represented the 4th district since 2003.

=== Republican primary ===
==== Candidates ====
===== Nominee =====
- Tom Cole, incumbent U.S. Representative

===== Eliminated in primary =====
- Gary D. Caissie

==== Results ====
Republican primary results
Party	Candidate	Votes	%
Republican	Tom Cole (incumbent)	22,840	87.7
Republican	Gary D. Caissie	3,195	12.3
Total votes		26,035	100.0

=== Democratic primary ===
==== Candidates ====
===== Nominee =====
- Donna Marie Bebo, Community Organizer

===== Eliminated in primary =====
- Bert Smith

==== Results ====
Democratic primary results
Party	Candidate	Votes	%
Democratic	Donna Marie Bebo	11,935	58.3
Democratic	Bert Smith	8,532	41.7
Total votes		20,467	100.0

=== General election ===
==== Endorsements ====
Tom Cole (R)

Organizations

- Americans for Legal Immigration
- Campaign for Working Families
- NRA Political Victory Fund
- National Right to Life Committee
- United States Chamber of Commerce

==== Predictions ====
Source	Ranking	As of
The Cook Political Report	Safe R	November 5, 2012
Rothenberg	Safe R	November 2, 2012
Roll Call	Safe R	November 4, 2012
Sabato's Crystal Ball	Safe R	November 5, 2012
NY Times	Safe R	November 4, 2012
RCP	Safe R	November 4, 2012
The Hill	Safe R	November 4, 2012

==== Results ====
Oklahoma's 4th congressional district, 2012
Party	Candidate	Votes	%
Republican	Tom Cole (incumbent)	176,740	67.9
Democratic	Donna Marie Bebo	71,846	27.6
Independent	RJ Harris	11,745	4.5
Total votes		260,331	100.0
Republican hold			

== District 5 ==
2012 Oklahoma's 5th congressional district election
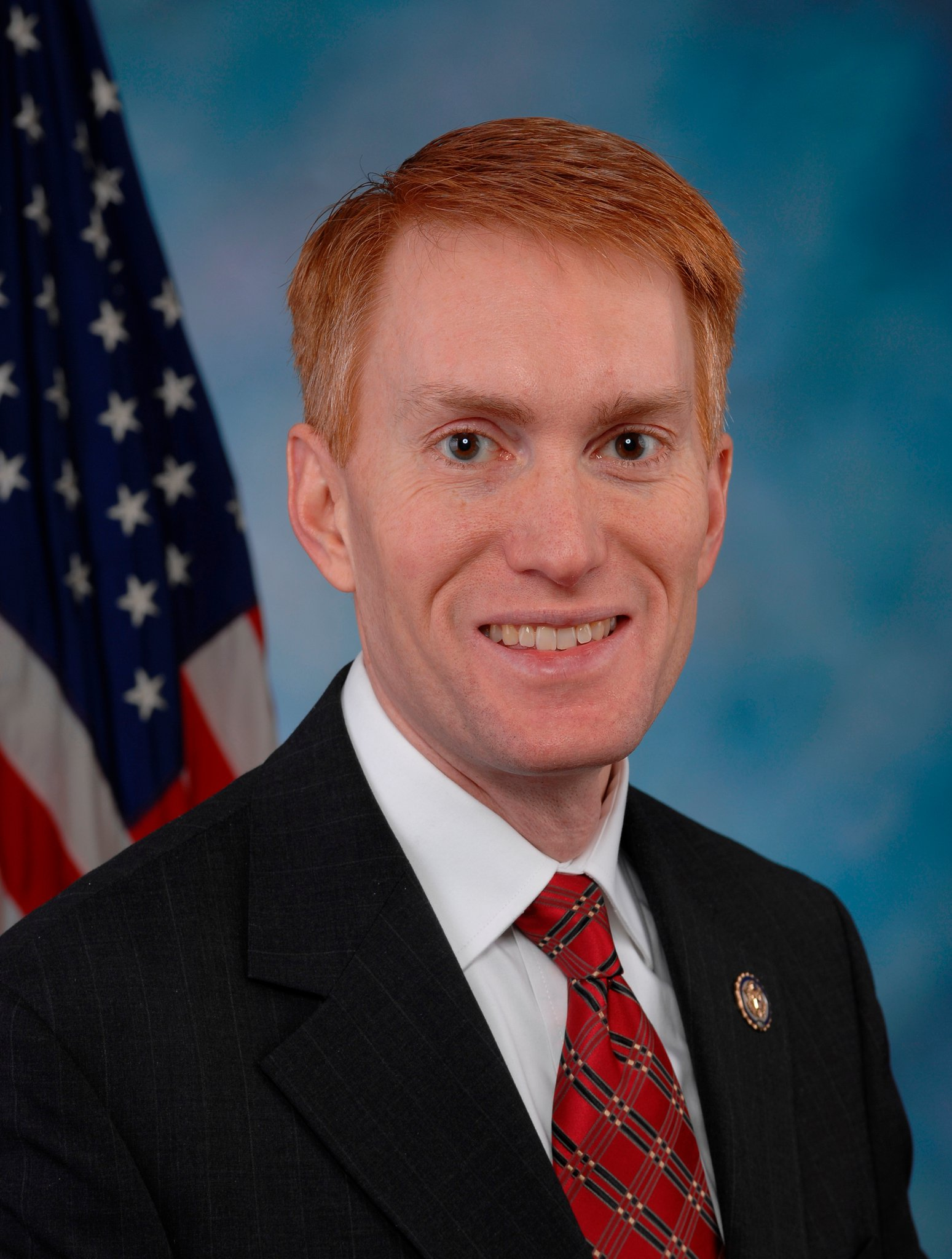

Nominee	James Lankford	Tom Guild
Party	Republican	Democratic
Popular vote	153,603	97,504
Percentage	58.7%	37.3%
- Precinct and county-level results Lankford: 40–50% 50–60% 60–70% 70–80% 80–90% Guild: 40–50% 50–60% 60–70% 70–80% 80–90% 90–100%
U.S. Representative before election
James Lankford
Republican
Elected U.S. Representative
James Lankford
Republican

Republican James Lankford, who has represented the 5th district since January 2011, is running for re-election. Tom Guild, a former political science professor at the University of Central Oklahoma and unsuccessful Democratic primary candidate for the 5th district in 2010, sort the Democratic nomination to challenge Lankford. There was no primary for either party as both Lankford and Guild ran unopposed for the Republican and Democratic nomination respectively and faced Modern Whig Party candidate Pat Martin and Libertarian Robert T. Murphy in the general election, both of whom were under the Independent label.

=== Republican primary ===
==== Candidates ====
===== Nominee =====
- James Lankford, incumbent U.S. Representative

=== Democratic primary ===
==== Candidates ====
===== Nominee =====
- Tom Guild, former political science professor at the University of Central Oklahoma and candidate for this seat in 2010

=== General election ===
==== Endorsements ====
James Lankford (R)

Organizations

- Campaign for Working Families
- NRA Political Victory Fund
- National Right to Life Committee
- United States Chamber of Commerce

==== Predictions ====
Source	Ranking	As of
The Cook Political Report	Safe R	November 5, 2012
Rothenberg	Safe R	November 2, 2012
Roll Call	Safe R	November 4, 2012
Sabato's Crystal Ball	Safe R	November 5, 2012
NY Times	Safe R	November 4, 2012
RCP	Safe R	November 4, 2012
The Hill	Safe R	November 4, 2012

==== Results ====
Oklahoma's 5th congressional district, 2012
Party	Candidate	Votes	%
Republican	James Lankford (incumbent)	153,603	58.7
Democratic	Tom Guild	97,504	37.3
Independent	Pat Martin	5,394	2.1
Independent	Robert T. Murphy	5,176	2.0
Total votes		261,677	100.0
Republican hold			
