= Arthur Hulbert =

American politician

Member of the Oklahoma House of Representatives from the 14th district
- In office 2012–2014
- Preceded by: George Faught
- Succeeded by: George Faught

Personal details
- Born: Waldron, Arkansas, U.S.
- Party: Republican
- Education: University of Central Arkansas; Rocky Mountain University

Arthur Hulbert is an American politician who served in the Oklahoma House of Representatives representing the 14th district from 2012 to 2014.

== Biography ==
Arthur Hulbert was born in Waldron, Arkansas. He earned a bachelor's and master's degree from the University of Central Arkansas and a doctorate from Rocky Mountain University. He served in the Oklahoma House of Representatives representing the 14th district from 2012 to 2014. He is a member of the Republican Party. He moved to Siloam Springs, Arkansas, in 2015 and became the city's chamber of commerce president in January 2020.
