= Wyoming State Library =

Official state library of Wyoming

Coordinates: 41.1442°N 104.8219°W

Agency overview
- Formed: December 16, 1871
- Jurisdiction: State of Wyoming
- Headquarters: 2800 Central Avenue; Cheyenne, WY 82002
- Agency executive: Abby Beaver, State Librarian
- Parent agency: Wyoming Department of Administration & Information
- Website: library.wyo.gov

The Wyoming State Library is the official state library agency of Wyoming located in Cheyenne, Wyoming. It is a department under Wyoming's Department of Administration & Information. The State Librarian as of 2024 is Abby Beaver.

The State Library maintains a Telework Lab for state employees. They also maintain the WYLD network of member libraries within the state which allows resource sharing. They sponsor an annual Wyoming Letters About Literature contest for Wyoming students in grades 4-12.

== History ==
The Wyoming Territorial Library was created on December 16, 1871 by an act of the Second Territorial Legislature. E. P. Johnson was appointed the first territorial librarian. The library was initially mainly a government documents depository and was located in the Opera House building at what is now 17th and Capitol. Minnie Slaughter was the first person to hold the title of State Librarian in 1890. The library became open to the public, to any state resident, in 1897. In 1917 the library moved into the east wing of the State Capitol; it moved again to share space with the Supreme Court in 1937. In 1968 the State Law Library and the State Library became two separate entities. In 1990 the State Library became a division of the Department of Administration & Information.

== See also ==
- List of libraries in the United States
