= South Dakota State Library =

Official State Library of South Dakota

Coordinates: 44.3718°N 100.3407°W

Agency overview
- Jurisdiction: State of South Dakota
- Headquarters: 800 Governors Drive; Pierre, SD
- Agency executive: George Seamon, State Librarian
- Parent agency: South Dakota Department of Education
- Website: library.sd.gov

The South Dakota State Library (SDSL) Is the official State Library of South Dakota located in Pierre, South Dakota. The SDSL is a division of the Department of Education and is governed by the seven-member South Dakota State Library Board. SDSL manages the Braille and Talking Book Library (est. 1968), provides a wide variety of online research and educational resources, and provide reference and research for state agencies. They are one of the smallest state libraries in the United States.

== History ==
A state library was originally created in 1901 by the South Dakota Legislature which established the State Historical Society and the Department of History of the State of South Dakota. The Department of History oversaw state library until 1913, when the Free Library Commission took over governance of the institution that became the South Dakota State Library.

== Building ==
SDSL was first housed in the office of the Department of History in the State Capitol in the early 1900s. It moved in to its own space in that building in 1932. In 1957 it had outgrown that space and moved into a grocery warehouse. Since 1976, the library has been in the MacKay Building in Pierre—which was purpose-built to house the SDSL—first on the lower two floors and now on the first floor.

== State librarians ==
State Librarians
Name	Tenure
Lilly M.E. Borreson	1913 – 1915
Lois A. Spencer	1915 – 1917
Julia C. Stockett	1917 – 1918
Leora J. Lewis	1918 – 1935
Celeste E. Barnes	1935 – 1939
Mercedes MacKay	1939 – 1973
Herschel Vincent Anderson	1973 – 1980
Clarence Coffindaffer	1981 – 1985
Jane Kolbe	1986 – 1999
Suzanne Miller	1999 – 2004
Dorothy Liegl	2004 – 2007
Dan Siebersma	2007 – 2012
Daria Bossman	2013 - 2021
George Seamon	2022 - present

== See also ==
- List of libraries in the United States
