= Colorado Library Consortium =

American non-profit organization

Logo

The non-profit Colorado Library Consortium (CLiC) is a library-related organization.

== Areas of concentration ==
- Resource sharing through services. Examples include a statewide library courier service transporting millions of books between libraries every year, and management of an integrated library system on behalf of participating libraries.
- Consulting for libraries in Colorado
- Continuing education for library staff
- Cooperative purchasing to help libraries save money
- Library "community building" and networking

== CLiC staff ==
- Executive Director: Jim Duncan

A full staff list can be found at: https://www.clicweb.org/about-clic/contact/

== History and Formation of the Organization ==
"In the late 1960s, Colorado libraries began to form regional service systems. In 1966 and 1967, seven regional systems were established to provide geographical convenience. That is, mountain regions grouped together as did metropolitan areas and the plains portions of the state. In 1975, Colorado State House Bill 1384 made the regional service systems official for all publicly supported libraries - public libraries, school media centers, governmental institutions and academic libraries. The legislature aimed to develop and coordinate cooperative library services including interlibrary loan, document delivery and purchasing. Private, for-profit libraries joined the regions as associate members, paying for desired services. Overall, the regional systems became known as CLiC, an acronym from Colorado Libraries in Cooperation, organized in 1976 in response to proposed state budget cuts.

Some services to Colorado libraries included the McNaughton Plan (a shared book leasing program for small public libraries); a courier to deliver materials from one library to another; assistance with obtaining state, federal and private grants; coordinated book purchasing at lower prices; shared consultant services, especially for technical computer equipment; and workshops directed at continuing education for librarians. Directors of the seven systems visited member libraries to establish communication and to keep informed of the needs of individual libraries within the systems.

Each regional service system employed an executive director with a small office staff. Regional member libraries sent representatives to a membership council which elected a governing board responsible for oversight of the regional service system, for budgeting the region's share of state funding, for supervision of the director and for hiring and firing of the office staff. Most governing boards met monthly. The director reported to the board, writing an annual report, planning services for the area and helping develop the next year's budget.

As computerization advanced, the regional service system offered training, consulting services, equipment repair and database searching services. Development of Union Lists aided in interlibrary loan. At first, the updated lists from other libraries arrived on microfiche. Gradually, the libraries computerized their holdings. The spread of the worldwide web in the 1990s led to shared search systems and the development of on-line catalogs accomplished with the help and direction of the regional directors.

In 2003, Governor Owens vetoed the section of the Colorado State budget that funded the Regional Library Service Systems amongst other budget cuts affecting a large number of libraries in Colorado. Each of the regions closed their offices and laid off staff. By the end of 2004, the Regional Library Service Systems no longer existed. A single, statewide entity called the Colorado Library Consortium was formed in 2004 to serve Colorado as a whole with one director and one office staff located in the Denver metropolitan area.
