= Delaware Division of Libraries =

Official state library agency of Delaware

Agency overview
- Formed: March 9, 1901
- Jurisdiction: State of Delaware
- Headquarters: 121 Martin Luther King Jr. Blvd. N Dover, Delaware
- Agency executive: Dr. Annie Norman, Director
- Parent agency: Department of State
- Website: libraries.delaware.gov

The Delaware Division of Libraries Is the official library agency for Delaware located in Dover, Delaware. The agency is responsible for Delaware Library Access Services (DLAS), the statewide summer reading program in conjunction with Delaware Libraries, and offering professional development opportunities for librarians statewide. They also run the Delaware Library Catalog.

== History ==
The Delaware State Library Commission was formed by an act of the legislature in 1901, its chairman was Manlove Hayes. At this time the state only had two free public libraries, one in Wilmington and one in Dover.

== See also ==
- List of libraries in the United States
