= George Faught =

American politician (born 1962)

Member of the Oklahoma House of Representatives from the 14th district
- In office November 16, 2014 – November 16, 2018
- Preceded by: Arthur Hulbert
- Succeeded by: Chris Sneed
- In office November 16, 2006 – November 16, 2012
- Preceded by: Barbara Staggs
- Succeeded by: Arthur Hulbert

Personal details
- Born: July 14, 1962 (age 64) Brownfield, Texas, U.S.
- Party: Republican
- Spouse: Becky Tinnin
- Children: 3
- Education: Muskogee, Oklahoma
- Occupation: Businessman
- Website: http://www.GeorgeFaught.com

George Faught (born July 14, 1962) is an American businessman and Republican politician from Oklahoma. Faught was Representative for District 14 in the Oklahoma House of Representatives from 2007 to 2012. House District 14 encompasses Muskogee, Fort Gibson, Braggs, Hulbert, and outlying areas. When the 51st Legislature was opened on February 5, 2007, Faught became the only Republican in state history to represent the historically Democratic 14th House District. He announced his candidacy for Oklahoma's 2nd congressional district on July 14, 2011.

== Early life ==
George Faught was born in Brownfield, Texas, on July 14, 1962. His family relocated to Muskogee, Oklahoma, when he was 6 months old. Faught graduated from Muskogee High School in 1980 and graduated from Bryan Institute in 1987. Faught owns his own carpet cleaning business.

== State representative ==
In 2006, long-time Democratic State Representative Barbara Staggs was termed out of office due term limits placed on her by the Oklahoma Constitution. To succeed her, Republican Faught faced former Democratic state representative Jeff Potts. Faught defeated Potts by receiving 54% of the vote and was elected to the 51st Oklahoma Legislature. By winning his election, Faught became the first Republican in state history to represent Muskogee in the Oklahoma Legislature. In the legislature, he was often identified with the right wing of the House GOP caucus that aligns more with Conservatives in the United States.

Faught sought reelection as state representative in 2008. Faught faced Democrat Eugene Blankenship, Muskogee County's emergency management director. Faught won reelection with 56% of the vote and was elected to the 52nd Oklahoma Legislature.

=== English as official language Bills ===
Faught was quick to spark controversy, when in January 2007 he filed a bill to make English the official language of Oklahoma. Democratic legislators and Native American tribes, such as the Cherokee and Creek, came out strongly against this legislation. The bill passed through committee 9-7 , but never made it to the House floor.

In the 2008 session Faught, along with Rep. Randy Terrill (R, Moore) again filed legislation to make English the Official Language of Oklahoma. This time, the bill passed through the House, but was not brought up in the Senate.

=== Committee Memberships ===
As of the 53rd Oklahoma Legislature, George Faught is a member of the following committees:

- Administrative Rules & Government Oversight Committee (Chair)
- Economic Development, Tourism & Financial Services Committee
- Transportation Committee

Faught is also a member of the following subcommittees:

- Eastern Oklahoma Redistricting Subcommittee
- A&B General Government & Transportation Subcommittee

== 2012 Congressional Campaign ==
On June 7, 2011, Congressman Dan Boren announced that he would not seek reelection to Oklahoma's 2nd congressional district in 2012. Faught announced the same day that he was forming an exploratory committee for the seat.

Faught declared his official candidacy on July 14. Faught lost to candidate Markwayne Mullin in the Republican primary runoff.

== Personal life ==
Faught is married to his wife Becky, and they have three children.

== Controversy ==
During a debate in the Oklahoma House on restricting abortion services, Faught responded to the question "are rape and incest the will of God" by saying that "God brings beauty out of ashes".

== Election history ==
November 4, 2008, Election results for Oklahoma State Representative for District 14
Candidates	Party	Votes	%
George Faught	Republican Party	7,449	55.54%
Eugene Blankenship	Democratic Party	5,962	44.46%

November 7, 2006, Election results for Oklahoma State Representative for District 14
Candidates	Party	Votes	%
George Faught	Republican Party	4,774	53.87%
Jeff Potts	Democratic Party	4,106	46.23%
