= Three Rivers Museum =

Local museum in Muskogee, Oklahoma

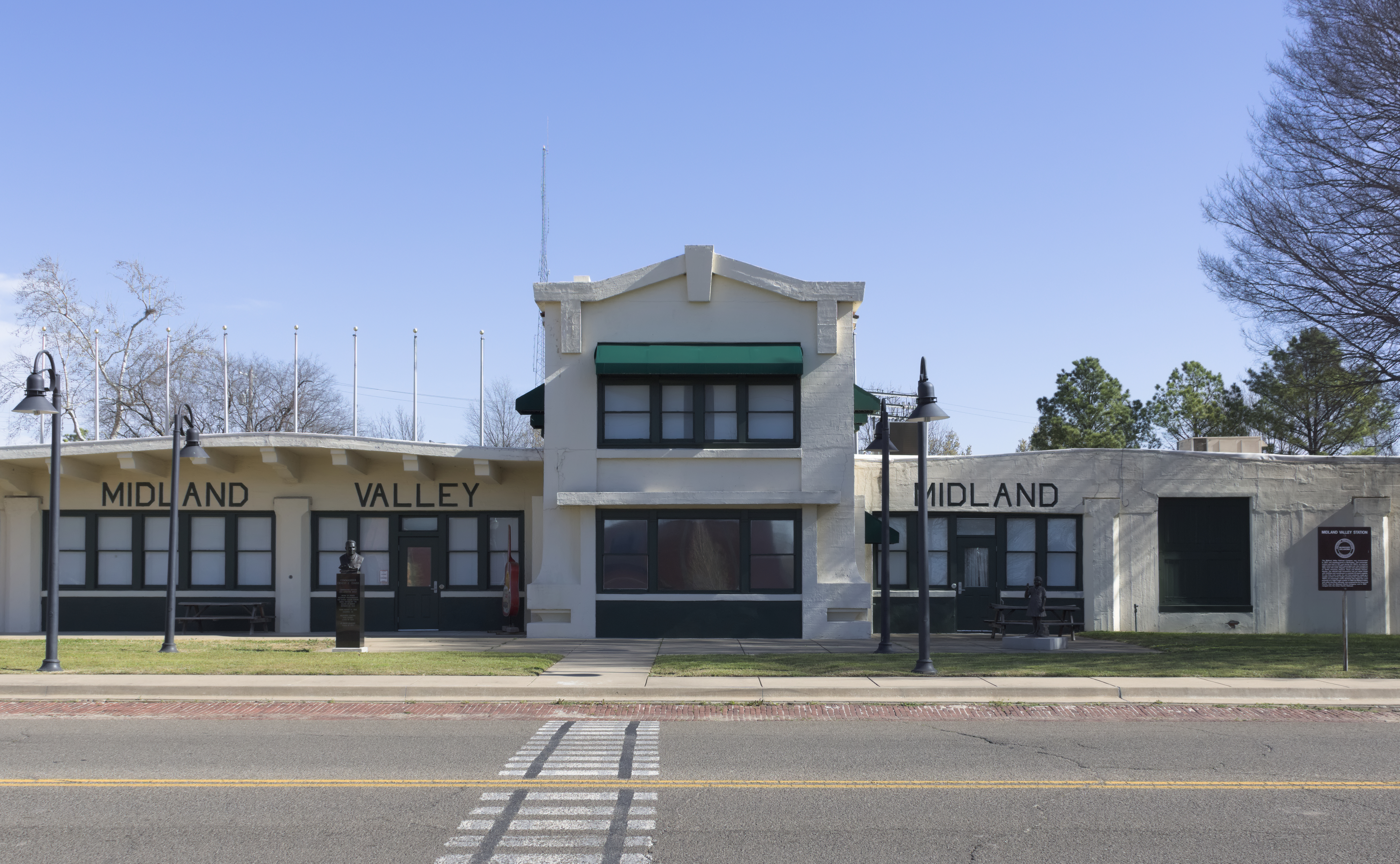
- The Midland Valley Railroad depot, used as the main location for the museum

- Location within Oklahoma Location within the United States
- Established: 1989; 37 years ago
- Location: Muskogee, Oklahoma, US
- Coordinates: 35°44′45″N 95°22′21″W
- Type: Local museum
- Visitors: 2,000 (2018)
- Founder: Dorothy Ball
- Director: Angie Rush
- Chairperson: Roger Bell
- Website: www.3riversmuseum.com

The Three Rivers Museum is a local museum in Muskogee, Oklahoma, United States. The museum was established in 1989, and its main location—a railroad depot formerly operated by the Midland Valley Railroad—was bought in the fall of 1998. After renovations, the museum opened on March 3, 2001. The museum features several exhibits both inside and outside of the depot, such as artifacts of Bass Reeves.

== History ==
The Three Rivers Museum was established in 1989. The idea of the museum originated from Dorothy Ball, the chairman of the Muskogee Historic Preservation Commission. The museum's name was derived from its location in the "Three Rivers" region in Muskogee, Oklahoma, which is surrounded by the Arkansas, Grand, and Verdigris River. In the fall of 1998, the museum acquired a railroad depot in Muskogee, which was originally owned by the Midland Valley Railroad. The depot was built in 1916, and was abandoned after the railroad line closed in 1964; the design of the depot is attributed to Louis Curtiss. The museum renovated the depot with federal grants of US$1,000,000 (equivalent to $1,975,296 in 2025) through the Oklahoma Department of Transportation. On March 3, 2001, the depot opened as the location for the museum. The freight area of the depot was used for the interior exhibits, and the ticket counter was used for the gift shop. On October 22, 2002, a diesel locomotive—which had worked at a Georgia Pacific paper mill in Muskogee—was donated to the museum; since 2002, the locomotive has been on static display behind the depot.

== Exhibits ==
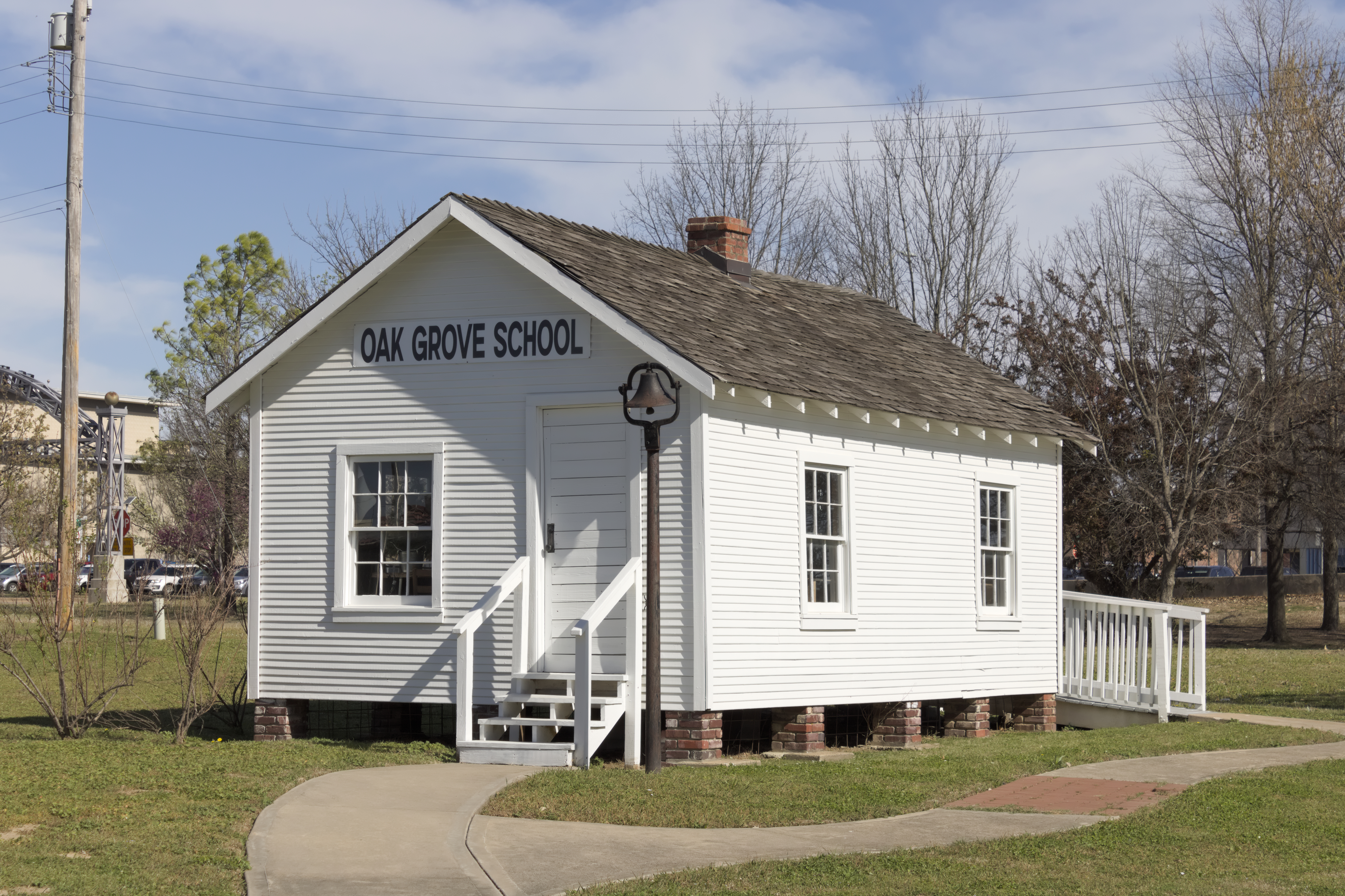
Oak Grove School at the Three Rivers Museum, March 2026

The museum has several exhibits both inside and outside of the depot. Exhibits inside of the museum include model trains depicting those used on the railroad which served the depot; artifacts of Bass Reeves, Belle Starr, and Alice Robertson; the 1917 founding of the Mistletoe Troop—a Girl Scout troop in Muskogee—and the first sales of Girl Scout Cookies; information about former local businesses in Muskogee; and rotating displays covering military history and women's suffrage. Exhibits outside of the museum include a diesel locomotive built in the 1940s; a one-room schoolhouse, known as Oak Grove School; and several statues. Other exhibits include a library of over one hundred videotapes of oral history interviews by the historian C. W. West, which were digitized by the Oklahoma Historical Society.

In front of the museum, a bronze statue named A Promise to Keep depicts a Girl Scout in uniform while giving a pledge—holding three fingers up on one hand—with four boxes of cookies at her feet. Another statue for the museum began construction in 2021. On January 11, 2025, an 8-foot (2.4 m) tall bronze statue of Bass Reeves was unveiled at the Three Rivers Museum. The statue depicts Bass Reeves walking on wooden floorboards with a Billy club in his hand, alluding to his service as a police officer. It has been suggested that the residents of Muskogee indirectly helped in the creation of the statue; the statue was created to commemorate Reeves. The tombstone of Bass Reeves is preserved at the museum. In addition to the exhibits at the Midland Valley Railroad depot, the museum operates the Grant Foreman House.

== Annual events ==
The museum hosts several annual events, sometimes in collaboration with other attractions in Muskogee. The museum—with the Oklahoma Music Hall of Fame—hosts Muskogee Heritage Days, an annual event featuring Native American music, medicine shows, and storytelling of the Old West. In addition, the museum hosts the Bass Reeves Legacy Tour. The Polar Express Pajama Party is held with the Roxy Theater, which features a screening of the 2004 film The Polar Express. Other annual events include Railroad Day and Bare Bones Film Festival.
