= Nebraska Library Association =

Professional association for librarians in Nebraska

- Formation: April 22, 1895; 131 years ago
- Tax ID no.: 47-0530907
- Parent organization: American Library Association
- Website: nebraskalibraries.org

The Nebraska Library Association (NLA) is a professional organization for Nebraska's librarians and library workers. It is headquartered in Lincoln, Nebraska. It was founded on April 22, 1895, at the University of Nebraska in Lincoln. Mary L. Jones was elected first president of the organization. Initial NLA conferences were held at the same time as the Nebraska State Teachers' Association or the Nebraska Federation of Women. NLA is a state chapter of the American Library Association (ALA). From 1932 through 1954 there was also a Lincoln Library Association, also a state chapter of ALA until ALA dissolved their local chapters.

NLA published Nebraska Libraries (ISSN 2326-3237, formerly known as Nebraska Library Association Quarterly [1970-2009]) online on a quarterly schedule [2013-2016]. NLA sponsors the statewide Golden Sower Award, a children's choice book award.

NLA has nine standing committees as of 2020.

- Advocacy
- Auditing
- By-Laws and Handbook
- Communications
- Professional Development
- Diversity
- Finance
- Elections
- Scholarship and Awards

== See also ==
- List of libraries in the United States
