= Oklahoma Department of Libraries =

State library for the U.S. state of Oklahoma

- Great Seal of Oklahoma

Agency overview
- Formed: 1907
- Preceding agency: Territorial Library
- Headquarters: Oklahoma City, Oklahoma
- Employees: 36
- Annual budget: $7.8 million SFY 2020
- Ministers responsible: Cynthia Vogel, Chair of the Board; Brian Bingman, Secretary of State
- Agency executives: Natalie Currie, Director; Cassie Spindle, Assistant Director
- Parent agency: Oklahoma Libraries Board
- Website: libraries.ok.gov

The Oklahoma Department of Libraries (ODL) is a department of the state of Oklahoma and serves as the official state library for the state of Oklahoma. ODL provides information services and management to the state, assists local public libraries, and coordinates statewide library and information technology projects.

ODL administers a variety of library and information services, including state archives, records management, state and federal government documents, and interlibrary referral.

== History ==
The ODL can trace its origins to the territorial days when on December 8, 1890, the First Legislative Assembly of the Territory of Oklahoma passed an act establishing a territorial library in Guthrie. George W. Steele, the governor of Oklahoma Territory also served as the first librarian. The library's name changed to Oklahoma Library in 1893, but the "Office of the State Librarian" was not officially established until statehood in 1907. The site of the library migrated to Oklahoma City in 1910 with the move of the state capital. The Oklahoma Library Code, passed in 1967, established the standards of governance of the library uses today.

== Archives and collections ==
The Oklahoma State Archives housed at ODL preserves the permanent records of the executive, legislative, and judicial branches of Oklahoma’s state government. The archives houses manuscripts, photographs, maps, and some artifacts, and the collections primarily include minutes, correspondence, annual reports, and publications. Records range from the 1890s until present, with the bulk being between 1907 and 1980. Prominent collections include the Office of the Governor, Office of the Attorney General, Oklahoma State Legislature, Oklahoma Supreme Court, Oklahoma Department of Education, and Oklahoma Corporation Commission.

Selected records from the holdings of the State Archives are available on the agency’s electronic library, Digital Prairie. The collections, largely composed of digitized materials, highlight the work of Oklahoma’s state government and Oklahoma history and culture.

Archives.OK.Gov includes more than 2,200 publications and documents from the State Archives. The collection primarily includes state agency reports and newsletters, and the records range from 1907, when Oklahoma became a state, until 1978. Archives.OK.Gov complements Documents.OK.Gov, which provides access to over 27,000 state government publications dating back to 1978. Notable records in Archives.OK.Gov include the Department of Education’s annual Educational Directories, the Department of Charities and Corrections’ annual reports, and the Department of Wildlife Conservation’s Outdoor Oklahoma magazine. ]

Images of Oklahoma is a state digital collection project funded by IMLS (Institute of Museum and Library Services) to make unique social, cultural, ethnic, and historical content from local collections accessible across the state. The collection features over 2,100 items from 50 different institutions, including Oklahoma libraries, archives, and museums. The collection includes yearbooks, photographs, postcards, and other records reflecting Oklahoma’s history and culture. Some collections include the Eugene Meacham Photography Collection from Kingfisher, the Stillwater Woman’s Club Collection, and the Oklahoma Railway Museum Collection.

The Tulsa Race Massacre collection features documents and images from various Oklahoma state government agencies, such as the Governor’s office and the Attorney General’s office, regarding the investigation into the Tulsa Race Massacre of 1921. The collection includes eye-witness testimony, letters, telegrams, police reports, and court cases.

Territorial Records encompasses any records produced prior to Oklahoma’s statehood on November 16, 1907. The majority of these records are reports created by Oklahoma Territory agencies, such as the Territorial Attorney General, Territorial Board of Health, and Territorial Superintendent of Public Instruction.

The Oklahoma Governors collection contain the official papers relating to the principal and appointive powers and responsibilities of the Governor of Oklahoma.

Confederate Pension Records and Index Cards are collections of the finding aid (index cards) and complete files of more than 7,000 individuals who applied to the State Board of Pension Commissioners under the Confederate Soldiers’ Pension Bill. The index cards are organized by name and often include the address, name of the spouse, date of marriage, date of death, and information about the veteran’s military service. The files include applications and correspondence, which provide information about the applicants’ locations and situations. These records are often used for genealogical research.

Ada Lois Sipuel Legal Case Files collection features 251 imaged documents from the Oklahoma State Supreme Court, Civil Case No. 32756 regarding the first African-American woman admitted to the University of Oklahoma law school in 1948.

The Oklahoma Postcards collection features postcards from the George H. Shirk and Wayne Mackey postcard collections housed in the Oklahoma Collection. The postcards were donated by the Oklahoma Heritage Association. The collection also includes some postcards donated from other institutions and individuals.

== Library Board ==
The Department of Libraries is governed by a seven-member Libraries Board, with each member appointed by the Governor with the approval of the Oklahoma Senate. There is one Board member for each of Oklahoma's five U.S. House districts, and two members are appointed "at large." The Board is responsible for establishing Departmental policy and for appointing higher level executive officers of the Department. The Director of the Department serves as an ex officio, non-voting, member of the Board and as the Board Secretary.

The current members of the Board are:

Representative	District Appointment	Term Expires
Annabeth Robin, Vice Chair	District 1	7/1/2021
Ronda Smith	District 2	7/1/2027
Lee Denney	District 3	7/1/2023
Steven Gray	District 4	7/1/2026
Robert Dace	District 5	7/1/2024
Cynthia Vogel, Chair	Member-at-Large	7/1/2022
James Robison	Member-at-Large	7/1/2026

Natalie Currie serves as the current Director of ODL and secretary for the board.

== See also ==
- List of libraries in the United States
