= Utah State Library =

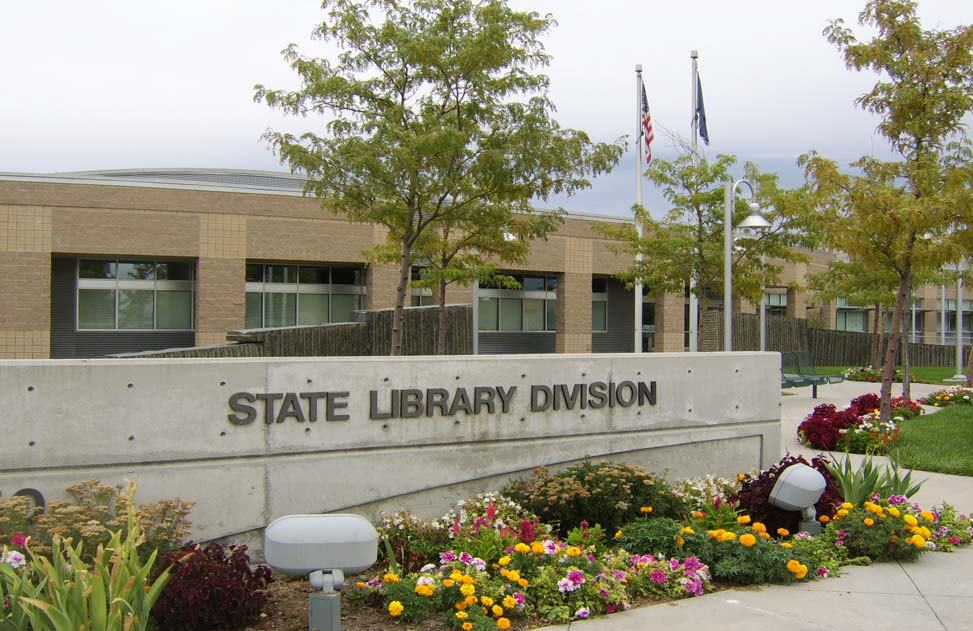
- Utah State Library
- 40.7764°N 111.9474°W
- Location: Salt Lake City, Utah, United States of America
- Type: Government of Utah
- Established: 1957

Other information
- Director: Cara Rothman, State Librarian
- Website: https://library.utah.gov/

The Utah State Library in Salt Lake City, Utah is a division of the Utah Department of Cultural and Community Engagement.

== History ==
The Utah State Library Commission was created in 1957 when Governor George D. Clyde appointed a ten-person library commission in accordance with a recently passed state law. The library was originally housed in the Governor's Mansion before it moved to the state fair grounds and ultimately was moved to 2150 South 300 West in Salt Lake City. In 1998 it moved to its current location at 250 North 1950 West in Salt Lake City.

== Purpose ==
The Utah State Library "provides funding, training, professional expertise and technical advice to library directors, staff, and trustees all across Utah."

== Programs & Services ==
=== Library Development Program ===
The Library Development Program supports Utah's libraries and librarians and promotes the improvement of library service through training, grant funding, consulting, youth services, outreach, and more.

- Certification & Recertification Standards for Utah's Public Libraries
- Consultants for Public Libraries
- E-Rate: Schools and Libraries Program of the Universal Service Fund
- Grants for Libraries
  - Community Library Enhancement Fund (CLEF)
  - Library Services and Technology Act (LSTA)
  - Utah Public Library Institute for Training (UPLIFT) Grants
- Library Outreach
- Library Trustee Center
- State Data: Statistical Annual Reports, Public Library Statistics, & Library Data Tools
- Training, Continuing Education, & Professional Development
  - Online Webinars
  - Utah Public Library Institute For Training (UPLIFT)
- Youth Services
  - Book Your Summer in partnership with my529
  - Summer Reading Program
  - Utah Kids Ready to Read!

=== Library Resources Program ===
The Library Resources Program supports Utah's libraries and librarians and promotes access to library resources through interlibrary loan, lender support, book club book sets, online resources, and more.

- Book Buzz for Book Groups
- Interlibrary Loan
- Technical Services & Cataloging
- Utah ILS Collections Consortium
- Utah Libraries Online Website Program
- Utah's Online Public Library (formerly Pioneer: Utah's Online Library)

=== Program for the Blind and Disabled ===
The Utah State Library Program for the Blind and Disabled provides free braille and audio books for people who either permanently or temporarily cannot read or use conventional printed materials due to visual or physical limitations, i.e., blindness, a visual disability, a physical inability to hold a book, and/or a print disability. This includes people in private homes, nursing homes, hospitals, schools and other institutions.

=== Utah Bookmobiles Program ===
Bookmobiles are a service provided through a cooperative contract with the Utah State Library and local counties and cities. They provide full library service to citizens living in rural communities including: Garfield, Iron, Juab, Kane, Piute, Sevier, Wayne, and Utah counties and the city of Vernon in Tooele County. Four bookmobiles are headquartered throughout the state making service available Monday through Thursday at over 200 stops.

== State Librarians ==
- Russell Davis (1957-1987)
- Amy Owen (1987-2004)
- Donna Jones Morris (2004–2018)
- Colleen Eggett (2018-2021)
- Chaundra Johnson (2021-2024)
- Cara Rothman (2024- )

== See also ==
- List of libraries in the United States
