= Colorado State Library =

Official State Library of Colorado

Coordinates: 39.74038°N 104.98455°W

Agency overview
- Formed: 1861
- Jurisdiction: State of Colorado
- Headquarters: 201 East Colfax Ave, Room 309; Denver, CO 80203
- Agency executive: Nicolle Ingui Davies, Assistant Commissioner
- Parent agency: Colorado Department of Education
- Website: www.cde.state.co.us/cdelib/

The Colorado State Library (CSL) is the official State Library of Colorado located in Denver, Colorado. CSL provides resources for developing library-related policies, activities, and assistance for school, public, academic, and special libraries. The purpose and key responsibilities of CSL are defined in Colorado Library Law and further refined by goals and strategies set forth in the five-year Library Services and Technology Plan. CSL and the projects it supports and helps administer for publicly-funded libraries across the state of Colorado are funded in part by the Library Services and Technology Act (LSTA) grant funds, which are administered by the Institute of Museum and Library Services (IMLS).

== History ==
The Territorial Library and Cabinet was created on November 6, 1861. The Territorial Superintendent of Public Schools was named the Ex Officio Librarian. This institution became the state library when Colorado became a U. S. state in 1876. In 1899 the State Board of Library Commissioners was formed to improve and support public library services in the state. In 1929 the State Board of Library Commissioners merged with the Colorado Traveling Library Commission which had been established by the local State Federation of Women's Clubs in 1903. This new agency was called the Colorado Library Commission until 1933 when it became the Colorado State Library.

== See also ==
- List of libraries in the United States
