= List of University of Oklahoma people =

The list of University of Oklahoma people includes notable alumni, faculty, and former students of the University of Oklahoma.

== Educators ==
- Clinton E. Adams, former medical school dean at Western University of Health Sciences, current president of Rocky Vista University
- Gary Clayton Anderson, historian and the George Lynn Cross Research Professor
- J.S. Bandukwala, physics professor at M.S.University and prominent Indian human rights activist
- Mary Jane Brown, first person to earn a doctorate from the University of Oklahoma
- Yvonne Chouteau, one of the Five Moons and co-founder of the School of Dance at the University of Oklahoma
- Jerry Farley, long-time administrator at OU; 16th president of Washburn University
- Alison Fields, Mary Lou Milner Carver Professor of Art of the American West
- Julia Gaines, director of the University of Missouri School of Music
- Elizabeth Garrett, legal scholar, 13th president of Cornell University
- Kyle Harper, historian of ancient Rome
- Barbara Hillyer, founder and first director of the university's Women's Studies program, which was the first of its kind in Oklahoma
- Leon Quincy Jackson (1926/1927–1995), architect, professor, early African-American architect in Oklahoma and Tennessee
- Ori Kritz, Hebrew professor
- Robert L. Lynn, president of Louisiana College in Pineville, Louisiana, 1975–1997; received PhD from Oklahoma
- Charles W. Mooney Jr., Charles A. Heimbold, Jr. Professor of Law, and former interim dean, at the University of Pennsylvania Law School
- Roger E. Nebergall, professor of Speech
- Harriet Wright O'Leary (1916–1999), teacher and politician; first woman to serve on the tribal council of the Choctaw Nation of Oklahoma
- James Morton Smith, historian, recipient of a Guggenheim Fellowship (1960), director of Winterthur Museum, Garden and Library (1976–1984)
- Miguel Terekhov, ballet dancer and instructor, co-founder of the School of Dance at the University of Oklahoma
- Julie Ann Ward, Spanish professor, poet laureate of Norman.

== Scientists ==
- Gregory Benford, physicist and science fiction writer
- James Benford, physicist
- Howard Bluestein, atmospheric scientist
- Norman H. Boke, botanist
- Frederick Carr, meteorologist
- Charles A. Doswell III, meteorologist
- Georgette D. Kanmogne, geneticist and molecular virologist
- Henry T. Lynch, cancer researcher
- GA Mansoori, thermodynamic scientist
- Paul Markowski, meteorologist
- Jens Rud Nielsen, physicist
- Samuel L. Perry, sociologist
- Erik N. Rasmussen, atmospheric scientist
- Yvette Richardson, atmospheric scientist
- Marilyn Vann, Cherokee Nation engineer and activist
- Neil B. Ward, atmospheric physicist
- Christina Warinner, anthropologist
- Gladys West, mathematician
- Reed Timmer, meteorologist

== Athletes ==
- Vickey Ray Anderson, former professional football player
- Dee Andros, former collegiate football coach and Oregon State athletic director
- Jason Bartlett, former professional baseball player
- Mookie Blaylock, former professional basketball player
- Brian Bosworth, former professional football player
- Joe Bowden, former professional football player
- Anthony Bowie, former professional basketball player
- Sam Bradford, former professional football player, Heisman Trophy winner
- Donald Brown, former professional football player
- Bill Campbell, American player of gridiron football
- Tom Churchill, former Olympic decathlete, football player and multiple sports
- Mark Clayton, former professional football player
- Patrick Collins, former professional football player
- Bart Conner, former gold medal gymnast
- Isaiah Cousins (born 1994), professional basketball player for the KB Bashkimi of the Kosovo Basketball Superleague
- Stacey Dales, former WNBA player and ESPN analyst, current NFL Network host/reporter
- Jack Davis, professional football player
- Greg Dobbs, former professional baseball player
- Kristian Doolittle (born 1997), professional basketball player for the Perth Wildcats of the NBL
- Roger Eason, former professional football player
- Jimmy Edwards, professional football player
- Kelly Garrison-Funderburk, former All-American gymnast and 1988 USA Olympian
- Harvey Grant, former professional basketball player
- Jermaine Gresham, former professional football player
- Matt Grice, wrestler; professional mixed martial artist, former UFC featherweight
- Blake Griffin, former professional basketball player, 1st pick in the 2009 NBA draft of the Los Angeles Clippers
- Quentin Griffin, professional football player, currently playing in Europe as of 2013
- Jake Hager, current MMA fighter with Bellator and professional wrestler with All Elite Wrestling; former WWE World Heavyweight Champion and WWE United States Champion as Jack Swagger
- Todd Hamilton, professional golfer, won The Open Championship in 2004
- Tommie Harris, former professional football player
- Mickey Hatcher, former professional baseball player and coach
- Ray Hayward, Major League Baseball pitcher
- Josh Heupel, football player, current head coach of the University of Tennessee Volunteers
- Victor Hicks, former professional football player
- Buddy Hield, professional basketball player for the Golden State Warriors of the NBA
- Cowboy Hill, professional football player
- Danny Hodge, former All-American wrestler and pro wrestler
- Jonathan Horton, former All-American gymnast and current USA Olympian
- Randy Hughes, former professional football player
- Demontre Hurst, NFL player
- Jalen Hurts, professional football player, current quarterback for the Philadelphia Eagles
- Clint Ingram, professional football player
- Keith Jackson, former professional football player
- Dionnah Jackson-Durrett, college basketball coach
- Jack Jacobs, football player, popularized the forward pass
- Ed Jeffers, former professional football player
- Lane Johnson, professional football player for the Philadelphia Eagles
- Bob Kalsu, former professional football player, killed in action as a US Army Artillery officer in Vietnam
- Anthony Kim, professional golfer
- Bobby Kimball, former professional football player
- Stacey King, former professional basketball player
- Jim Mankins, former professional football player
- Rod Manuel, former professional football player
- Baker Mayfield (Class of 2017), professional football player, current quarterback for the Tampa Bay Buccaneers, Heisman Trophy winner
- Gerald McCoy, former professional football player
- Wahoo McDaniel, former professional wrestler and football player
- Tommy McDonald, former professional football player and NFL hall of fame member
- Russ McGinnis, former professional baseball player
- Lee Morris, former professional football player
- DeMarco Murray, former professional football player who is now the running backs coach of the Oklahoma Sooners football team
- Kyler Murray (Class of 2018), professional football player, current quarterback for the Arizona Cardinals, Heisman Trophy winner, 9th overall draft pick in the 2018 MLB draft
- Eduardo Nájera, former professional basketball player, currently a scout for the Dallas Mavericks
- Ralph Neely, former professional football player
- Sheldon Neuse, professional baseball player
- Fred Nixon, former professional football player
- Greg Norton, former professional baseball player
- Rashard Odomes (born 1996), former professional basketball player
- Russ Ortiz, professional baseball player
- Romero Osby (born 1990), former professional basketball player
- Milton Overton, athletic director, Kennesaw State University
- Steve Owens, former professional football player and Heisman Trophy winner
- Ashley Paris, former professional basketball player
- Courtney Paris, former professional basketball player
- Lindy Pearson, former professional football player
- Adrian Peterson, former professional football player
- Hollis Price, former professional basketball player, currently an assistant coach for the Houston Cougars
- Clifford Ray, former professional basketball player and coach
- Austin Reaves, professional basketball player for the Los Angeles Lakers of the NBA
- Jimmy Rogers, professional football player
- Ryan Rohlinger, former professional baseball player
- Jason Rouser, Olympic gold medalist, track and field
- Darrell Royal, football player who became a highly successful coach at the University of Texas at Austin
- Dave Schultz, 3x NCAA Champion, Olympic and world champion wrestler
- Mark Schultz, 3x NCAA Champion, Olympic and world champion wrestler
- Lee Roy Selmon, former professional football player and NFL Hall of Fame member
- Steve Sewell, former professional football player
- Grant Sherfield (born 1999), professional basketball player for the Löwen Braunschweig of the BBL
- Larry Sherrer, former professional football player
- Joe Simpson, former professional baseball player and current Atlanta Braves broadcaster
- Travis Simpson, former professional football player
- Billy Sims, former professional football player, Heisman Trophy winner
- Burch Smith, Major League Baseball player; free agent
- Terry Stotts, currently an assistant coach for the Golden State Warriors of the NBA
- Evan Tanner, former mixed martial artist who won the UFC Middleweight Championship in 2005
- TaShawn Thomas (born 1993), professional basketball player for the Le Mans of the LNB Élite
- Spencer Tillman, former professional football player; National Champion, Super Bowl Champion San Francisco 49ers; sports analyst
- Wayman Tisdale, former professional basketball player
- Frank Trigg, MMA fighter and broadcaster
- Jerry Tubbs, former professional football player
- Richard Turner, former professional football player
- Casey Walker, NFL player
- Willie Warren, professional basketball player
- Joe Washington, former professional football player
- Elbert Watts, former professional football player
- J.C. Watts, former professional football player and former member of the U.S. House of Representatives
- Jason White, former football player, Heisman Trophy winner
- Roy Williams, former professional football player
- Trent Williams, football player, currently a member of the San Francisco 49ers
- Reggie Willits, former professional baseball player, first base coach of the New York Yankees
- Chet Winters, former professional football player
- J. T. Wise, former professional baseball player
- Bobby Witt, former professional baseball player
- Trae Young, professional basketball player for the Washington Wizards of the NBA
- Waddy Young, professional football player, killed in action as a US Army Air Force bomber pilot in World War II

== Architecture ==
- Leon Quincy Jackson (1926/1927–1995), architect, professor, early African-American architect in Oklahoma and Tennessee
- Elizabeth Bauer Mock, modern architecture advocate, museum director, professor of architecture
- Mickey Muennig (1935–2021), architect in California

== Arts and entertainment ==
- Brent Albright, professional wrestler, former NWA World Heavyweight Champion
- Alpharad, YouTuber, Esports personality, and musician
- Marilyn Artus, visual artist
- Gregory Benford, science fiction author and physicist, B.S. Physics, 1963
- Jennifer Berry, Miss America 2006
- Diane Bish, organist and composer
- Robert O'Neil Bristow, author
- Jim Butcher, author
- C. J. Cherryh, science fiction and fantasy author, B.A. Latin, 1964
- Kellie Coffey, country music singer
- Stephen Dickson, opera singer
- Larry Drake, television and film actor
- Ronnie Claire Edwards, actress
- James Garner, film actor and director
- David Gates, musician and lead singer for Bread
- Jim George, author
- Alice Ghostley, actress
- Sterlin Harjo, filmmaker
- Ed Harris, film actor and director
- Van Heflin, film and theater actor
- Robert Henson, journalist and author
- Adrianna Hicks, actress
- Mark Houston, composer, lyricist, newspaper columnist, and actor
- Rance Howard, actor
- Olinka Hrdy, artist, 1928
- Kevin James (undergraduate), radio show host and lawyer
- Honorée Fanonne Jeffers, poet and novelist
- Christian Kane, actor, musician, singer-songwriter
- Roberta Knie, opera singer
- Marvin Lamb, composer
- D.L. Lang, poet laureate of Vallejo, California
- Carol Littleton, film editor
- Kirstin Maldonado, soprano in the a capella band Pentatonix
- Kelly Mantle, drag queen and actor
- Travis McElroy, co-host and co-creator of The Adventure Zone and My Brother, My Brother, and Me
- Suzanne Mitchell, director of the Dallas Cowboys Cheerleaders
- Olivia Munn, actress (The Newsroom), model, spokesperson, and former G4 host
- Jason Nelson, pioneering net artist and digital poet, 1993
- Tom Paxton, singer-songwriter, B.F.A., 1959
- Meg Randall, actress
- Slim Richey, jazz guitarist
- G. Patrick Riley, mask maker and art educator
- Kevin Samuels, YouTuber
- Damin Spritzer, organist and academic
- Matt Villines (2000), film director (Funny or Die, Saturday Night Live)
- "Cowboy" Bill Watts, former professional wrestler
- Dennis Weaver, Emmy Award-winning actor
- "Dr. Death" Steve Williams, former All-American offensive lineman and popular pro wrestler, especially in Japan

== Law ==
- Vaughn Ary, first United States Marine Corps Judge Advocate Division major general, J.D., 1987
- Robert E. Bacharach, judge of the United States Court of Appeals for the Tenth Circuit, B.A., 1981
- Tom Colbert, chief justice of the Supreme Court of Oklahoma, first African-American Oklahoma Supreme Court Justice, J.D., 1982
- Noma Gurich, justice of the Supreme Court of Oklahoma, J.D., 1978
- Rudolph Hargrave, former justice of the Supreme Court of Oklahoma, J.D., 1949
- Robert Harlan Henry, judge of the United States Court of Appeals for the Tenth Circuit, former Oklahoma attorney general, B.A., 1974, J.D., 1976
- Anita Hill, OU Law professor and accuser in the Clarence Thomas scandal
- Ralph B. Hodges, former justice of the Supreme Court of Oklahoma, J.D., 1954
- William Judson Holloway Jr., judge of the United States Court of Appeals for the Tenth Circuit, B.A., 1947
- Alfred P. Murrah, judge of the United States Court of Appeals for the Tenth Circuit, namesake of the Alfred P. Murrah Federal Building, LL.B., 1928
- Angela R. Riley, chief justice of Citizen Potawatomi Nation
- Steven W. Taylor, justice of the Supreme Court of Oklahoma, J.D., 1974
- James R. Winchester, justice of the Supreme Court of Oklahoma, B. A., 1974

== Politics ==
- Carl Albert, former speaker of the U.S. House of Representatives (D-OK), B.A. Political Science, 1927
- Alicia Andrews, chair of the Oklahoma Democratic party, B.A. Psychology
- Dick Armey, former U.S. House Majority Leader (R-TX), PhD Economics
- Alan Armstrong, junior United States senator representing the state of Oklahoma since 2026
- Jari Askins, former lieutenant governor of Oklahoma, B.A. Journalism, 1975; J.D., 1980
- Dan Boren, former congressman (D-OK), M.B.A., 2000
- David Boren, former governor of Oklahoma and U.S. Senator (D-OK); former president of the University of Oklahoma, J.D., 1968
- Brad Carson, former congressman (D-OK), J.D. 1994
- Fernando Chui Sai On, current chief executive and former secretary for Social and Cultural Affairs of the Macau Special Administrative Region of the People's Republic of China, PhD Public Health
- Tom Coburn, former U.S. senator and congressman (R-OK), M.D., 1983
- Tom Cole, congressman (R-OK), PhD British History, 1984
- Mick Cornett, former mayor of Oklahoma City
- Walter E. Gaskin, retired United States Marine Corps lieutenant general; current secretary of Military and Veterans Affairs for the State of North Carolina; Master's in Public Administration, 1990–1992
- David Hall, former governor of Oklahoma
- John Tyler Hammons, mayor of Muskogee, Oklahoma (R), J.D. 2015
- Brad Henry, former governor of Oklahoma (D), B.A. Economics, 1985, J.D., 1988
- Kirk Humphreys, former mayor of Oklahoma City, B.B.A., 1972
- Wayne Harold Johnson (Master of Library Science), member of both houses of the Wyoming State Legislature from Cheyenne, 1993 to 2017 (R)
- Frank Keating, former governor of Oklahoma (R), J.D., 1969
- Robert H. Kittleman, Maryland state senator, 1947
- Jess Larson, U.S. Air Force major general and first administrator of the General Services Administration
- Peter MacDonald, Navajo code talker, 7th chairman of the Navajo Nation
- Susana Martinez, governor of New Mexico (R), first Latina governor in the U.S.; J.D. 1986
- Donald McClarren, member of the New Hampshire House of Representatives
- Dave McCurdy, former congressman (D-OK)
- Scott Meacham, former state treasurer of Oklahoma
- Ruth Messinger, former president of the Borough of Manhattan
- Monroe Nichols, mayor of Tulsa, Oklahoma (D), M.P.A.
- William Ridenour, member of the West Virginia House of Delegates (R), graduate degree, 2000
- Anwar Sabbah, former Lebanese government minister, bachelor's in mechanical engineering, 1956
- Frank Spooner, Louisiana businessman and Republican politician, B.S., 1960
- Rob Standridge, Oklahoma state senator (R), Bachelor's Pharmacy, 1993
- David Walters, former governor of Oklahoma (D), B.S. Industrial Engineering, 1973
- J. C. Watts, former U.S. representative and chairman of the House Republican Conference (R-OK), B.A. Journalism, 1981

== Others ==
- Leila Andrews (1876–1954), physician, associate professor of medicine at OU College of Medicine (1910–1925)
- Kevin Bales, founder of Free the Slaves
- Harry W. Bass, Sr. (1895–1970), oilman and philanthropist
- Clay Bennett, majority owner of the Oklahoma City Thunder
- Pat Bowlen, owner of the Denver Broncos (deceased)
- Roger Brady, Air Force general
- Phillip T. Butler POW in North Vietnam, president of Veterans for Peace
- Mike Davis, anthropologist, archeologist, and boat builder
- Angie Debo, historian of Oklahoma and Native Americans, A.B. History 1918, PhD 1933
- Jordan Deschamps-Braly, maxillofacial surgeon
- Archie W. Dunham, oil and gas CEO
- Bob Faith (born 1963/1964), founder, chairman and CEO of Greystar Real Estate Partners
- Roy Furr, founder of Furr's grocery store and cafeteria chain
- Owen K. Garriott, Skylab 3 and STS-9 astronaut, B.S. Electrical Engineering, 1953
- Fred Haise, Apollo 13 astronaut, B.S. Aeronautical Engineering, 1959
- Thomas J. Haynes, Air National Guard general
- Elma Holder, elder rights activist
- Joshua Landis, director of the Center for Middle East Studies at the University of Oklahoma
- Anna Lewis (1885–1961), historian, writer, PhD 1930
- Tom Love, owner, founder, and chairman of Love's Travel Stops & Country Stores (dropped out)
- Shannon Lucid, astronaut, PhD Biochemistry, 1973
- Kelli Masters, lawyer and sports agent
- Rodney McKinley, 15th Chief Master Sergeant of the Air Force
- Larry Merchant, sportswriter and commentator for HBO Sports
- Dari Nowkhah, lead anchor for ESPNU
- Lotsee Patterson, librarian, educator, and founder of the American Indian Library Association
- Ross Porter, broadcaster for the Los Angeles Dodgers
- Michael F. Price, mutual fund investor
- Mark M. Ravitch, surgeon
- Lawrence G. Rawl, chairman and CEO of Exxon
- Rick Rescorla, director of security for Morgan Stanley, killed while leading evacuation efforts at the South Tower during the September 11 Attacks
- Gary Michael Rose, 1989, U.S. Army captain, Medal of Honor recipient, Vietnam War 1970
- Jeffrey D. Sadow, political scientist, conservative columnist
- Charles Schusterman (1945–2000), businessman, philanthropist
- Randall L. Stephenson, chairman and CEO of AT&T
- Susan Stryker, professor, author, filmmaker, director of the University of Arizona's Institute of LGBT Studies
- Helen Walton, widow of Sam Walton
- William C. Wantland, bishop of the Episcopal Diocese of Eau Claire
- Grace Steele Woodward, writer and historian
