= List of University of New Mexico alumni =

List of alumni of the University of New Mexico in Albuquerque, New Mexico.

== Academia ==
Alumnus	Class	Notability	References
John Adair	1948 PhD	Pioneer of Navajo and Zuni cultural studies; professor of anthropology at San Francisco State University and Cornell University	
James Anaya	1980	Dean of the University of Colorado Law School, United Nations Special Rapporteur	
Christopher Andronicos	1995	Associate professor of geology at Purdue University	
Bob Barney	1959	Academic and sports historian	
Kirk Bryan		Geologist on the faculty of Harvard University	
Gregory Cajete		One of the founders of integrating Native American studies with science disciplines	
Lena Clauve	1927 BA	Dean of Women at the University of New Mexico	
Jack Dongarra	1980	Mathematician, computer scientist, and professor at the University of Tennessee	
James G. Ellis	1968	Dean of USC Marshall School of Business	
Wade Ellis	1938	Associate dean of the Rackham Graduate School	
Alison Fields	2009 PhD	Art historian; professor at the University of Oklahoma	
Lee Fitzgerald		Professor of zoology and curator of amphibians and reptiles at Texas A&M University	
Julio Gea-Banacloche	1985	Head of the department of physics at the University of Arkansas	
Shohini Ghose	2003	Quantum physicist and professor of physics and computer science at Wilfrid Laurier University	
Eva Simone Hayward	2001 BA	Women's studies researcher on faculty at University of Arizona	
Elizabeth Lapovsky-Kennedy	non-degreed	Social anthropologist who founded the Women's Studies College at SUNY Buffalo	
Vernon Lattin	1960 BBA	President of Brooklyn College	
Vernon Lattin	1965 MA	President of Brooklyn College	
Thomas F. Madden	1986 BA	Chair of the history department at Saint Louis University; director of Saint Louis University's Center for Medieval and Renaissance Studies	
sj Miller		Professor of teacher education at the Santa Fe Community College	
Marion Pearsall	1944 BA	Medical and cultural anthropologist at the University of Kentucky and its Medical Center	
Michael D. Rhodes	1989 MS	Egyptologist; associate professor of ancient scripture emeritus at Brigham Young University	
Leon Silver	1948 MS	Professor of geology at California Institute of Technology	
Jerry D. Thompson	MA	Professor of history at Texas A&M International University	
Jada Benn Torres	2001 MA	Genetic anthropologist and associate professor of anthropology at Vanderbilt University	
Jada Benn Torres	2006 PhD	Genetic anthropologist and associate professor of anthropology at Vanderbilt University	

== Art and architecture ==
Alumnus	Class	Notability	References
Rodney Carswell	1968 BFA	Abstract artist and painter	
William Conger	1966	Artist and painter	
Barbara Degenevieve	1980	Interdisciplinary artist who worked in photography, video, and performance	
Richard Diebenkorn	1951	Painter and printmaker	
Adee Dodge	1933 BA	Painter, Navajo code talker, and linguist	
Anita Douthat	1986	Fine art photographer	
Wendy Edwards	1974	Contemporary painter and educator	
Bashirul Haq	1975 MArch	Architect and town planner	
Marcelina Herrera		Painter	
Carmelita Little Turtle		Photographer	
Melissa Miller	1974	Artist	
Jennifer Nehrbass	MFA	Artist	
Antoine Predock		Architect	
Meridel Rubenstein	1977 MFA	Photographer and installation artist	
Margaret Stratton	1983 MA	Photographer and video artist	
Margaret Stratton	1985 MFA	Photographer and video artist	
Signe Margaret Stuart	1961 MA	Artist, known for abstract paintings	
Maye Torres	MFA	Artist	

== Business ==
Alumnus	Class	Notability	References
Terry Calvani	1970	Commissioner of the Federal Trade Commission	
Edward Lewis	1964	Chairman and CEO of Essence Communications Inc.	
Robert Mercer	1968	Co-CEO of Renaissance Technologies	
Caswell Silver	1940	Geologist and CEO of Sundance Oil Company	

== Entertainment ==
Alumnus	Class	Notability	References
Tony Booth		Country musician	
Raven Chacon	2001	Musician, composer, and winner of the 2022 Pulitzer Prize for Music	
Cissy King		Singer and dancer; featured performer on The Lawrence Welk Show	
John Lewis		Jazz pianist, composer and arranger	
Miguel Marquez		ABC News correspondent	
Penny Marshall		Actress and director	
Barrett Martin	2005; 2008	Grammy Awards-winning producer, drummer, composer, and writer	
Cody Willard	1996	Fox Business Network anchor	

== Law ==
Alumnus	Class	Notability	References
Joseph F. Baca	1960	Chief justice of the New Mexico Supreme Court	
Paul Bloom		Lawyer, special counsel for the United States Department of Energy during the Carter Administration	
Santiago E. Campos	1953 JD	United States federal judge	
Edward L. Chavez	1981	Chief justice of the New Mexico Supreme Court	
Judith C. Herrera	1976	United States federal judge	
David Iglesias	1984	Former United States attorney for the District of New Mexico; controversially dismissed	
Donald L. Ivers		Former judge of the United States Court of Appeals for Veterans' Claims	
Gary King	1984	New Mexico attorney general	
Thomas J. Mabry		Chief justice of the New Mexico Supreme Court; Governor of New Mexico	
John H. Morrison		Senior partner of the law firm Kirkland & Ellis	
Judith Nakamura	1983	Chief justice of the New Mexico Supreme Court	
Judith Nakamura	1989 JD	Chief justice of the New Mexico Supreme Court	
Carol Jean Vigil		First Native American woman to be a state district judge in the United States	

== Literature and journalism ==
Alumnus	Class	Notability	References
Edward Abbey	1951	Author and essayist, known for his novel The Monkey Wrench Gang	
Edward Abbey	1956	Author and essayist, known for his novel The Monkey Wrench Gang	
Paige Ackerson-Kiely	BA	Poet	
Ania Ahlborn		Horror novelist	
Rudolfo Anaya	1963 BA	Author and humanitarian, best known for his 1972 novel Bless Me, Ultima	
Rudolfo Anaya	1968 MA	Author and humanitarian, best known for his 1972 novel Bless Me, Ultima	
Rudolfo Anaya	1972 MA	Author and humanitarian, best known for his 1972 novel Bless Me, Ultima	
Sarah Bird	1973	Novelist, screenwriter, and journalist	
Janice Gould		Writer and poet	
Joy Harjo	1976	Former United States Poet Laureate, writer, musician, and activist	
James Haskins	1963	Author of books for children and adults	
George Johnson	1975	Journalist and science writer	
Brian Jay Jones	1989	Biographer	
L. Luis Lopez		Poet	
Lori Ostlund		Short story writer	
Mel Plaut	1997 BA	Writer, essayist, and taxi driver	
V. B. Price	1962	Poet and columnist	
Kathryn Ptacek	1974	Author and magazine editor	
Leslie Marmon Silko	1969 BA	Writer and key figure in the Native American Renaissance	
Melinda M. Snodgrass		Science fiction novelist and screenwriter	

== Military ==
Alumnus	Class	Notability	References
Gregory R. Bryant	BS	United States Navy rear admiral	
Emil Lassen	1978 BS	Air National Guard major general	
William L. Nyland	1968	United States Marine Corps four-star general; former assistant commandant of the Marine Corps	

== Politics ==
Alumnus	Class	Notability	References
Jerry Apodaca	1953	Governor of New Mexico	
Lynn Birleffi		Wyoming House of Representatives	
Charles W. Blackwell	1972	First ambassador of the Chickasaw Nation to the United States (1995–2013)	
Jennifer Carroll	1985	Lieutenant governor of Florida	
Martin Chávez	1975	Mayor of Albuquerque	
Brian Colon		Former chairman of the Democratic Party of New Mexico	
Diane Denish	1971	Lieutenant governor of New Mexico	
Pete Domenici	1954	United States Senate	
Deb Haaland	1994	Secretary of the United States Department of the Interior; United States House of Representatives	
Deb Haaland	2006	Secretary of the United States Department of the Interior; United States House of Representatives	
Shirley Hufstedler	1945	First United States Secretary of Education	
Gary Johnson	1975	Governor of New Mexico; 2012 and 2016 presidential candidate	
Ghanim Al-Jumaily	1987	Ambassador of Iraq to Saudi Arabia, ambassador of Iraq to Japan	
Bruce King		Governor of New Mexico	
Peter Koo	1975	Member of the New York City Council	
Michelle Lujan Grisham	1981	Governor of New Mexico and United States House of Representatives	
Thomas J. Mabry		Governor of New Mexico and chief justice of the New Mexico Supreme Court	
Lenton Malry	1968	First African American to serve in the New Mexico House of Representatives	
Oscar W. McConkie Jr.	1946	Utah State Senate and Utah House of Representatives	
Cisco McSorley	1974	New Mexico Senate and New Mexico House of Representatives	
Cisco McSorley	1979 JD	New Mexico Senate and New Mexico House of Representatives	
Steven Schiff	1972 JD	United States House of Representatives	
Jean Schodorf		Kansas Senate	
Thomas C. Taylor		New Mexico House of Representatives	
Maggie Toulouse Oliver	BA	Secretary of state of New Mexico	
Maggie Toulouse Oliver	MA	Secretary of state of New Mexico	
Kathleen Kennedy Townsend	1978 JD	Former lieutenant governor of Maryland; the eldest of Robert F. Kennedy's children	
Tom Udall	1977 JD	United States House of Representatives; United States Senate	
John Wertheim	1995 JD	Former member of the executive committee of the Democratic National Committee	

== Science, technology, and medicine ==
Alumnus	Class	Notability	References
Aleksandra Faust	2014 PhD	AI researcher and research director at Google DeepMind	
Kathy Lueders	1986	First woman to head NASA's human spaceflight program	
Michael Trujillo	1966 BS	Physician and director of the Indian Health Service	
Michael Trujillo	1967 BA	Physician and director of the Indian Health Service	
Michael Trujillo	1970 MA	Physician and director of the Indian Health Service	
Michael Trujillo	1974 MD	Physician and director of the Indian Health Service	

== Sports ==
Alumnus	Class	Notability	References
John Baker	1966	WAC Cross-Country and Mile Championship	
Dave Barney	1959	Educator and swimming coach	
Hank Baskett	2006	Former NFL wide receiver	
Charlie Beljan		PGA Tour winner	
Byron Bell	2010	Former NFL offensive tackle	
David Bishop		All-American middle-distance runner and international athlete	
Ken Brown		Former NFL offensive lineman	
Adva Cohen		Israeli runner	
Robin Cole		Former NFL player, first-round draft pick, and two-time Super Bowl winner	
Michael Cooper	1978	Former NBA player	
Justin Davis		Soccer player	
Sam Dixon	1997	College basketball coach	
John Dodson		Mixed martial artist competing for the Ultimate Fighting Championship	
Jordan Espinosa		Wrestler and mixed martial artist for the UFC	
Andy Frederick		Former NFL offensive tackle	
Luis González		Baseball outfielder for the San Francisco Giants	
Danny Granger		NBA player	
Kelly Graves	1987	Head women's basketball coach at University of Oregon	
Eddie Guerrero		WWE wrestler and a prominent member of the Guerrero wrestling family	
Daniel Ray Herrera		Major League Baseball player	
Tim Herron		Professional golfer on the PGA Tour	
Katie Hnida	2004	First woman to score in a Division I college football game and a college football bowl game	
Euan Holden		Professional association football player	
Shawn Hollingsworth		Former NFL player	
Holly Holm		Professional mixed martial arts fighter, former UFC bantamweight champion	
Brian Johnson		Football player	
Rocky Long	1971	Head football coach, San Diego State University	
Luc Longley	1991	Former NBA player and the first Australian to play in the NBA	
Terance Mathis	1990	Former NFL player	
Jordan Pacheco		Major League Baseball infielder for the Colorado Rockies	
Don Perkins		Former NFL All-Pro running back	
Devon Sandoval		Soccer player for Real Salt Lake	
Sam Scarber	s1970	Former NFL and CFL player	
Scott Strickland		Major League Baseball player	
John Sullivan		Football player	
Kenny Thomas	1999	Former NBA player, 1st Round draft pick in 1999 for Rockets, then 76ers and Kings	
Brian Urlacher	2000	Former NFL Defensive Player of the Year	
Rodney Wallace	1970	Former NFL player and Super Bowl champion	
