= F. C. Love =

American lawyer

Frank Criner Love, Jr. (April 29, 1908 – December 2, 1978) was an American lawyer and president of the Kerr-McGee oil company.

== Early life ==
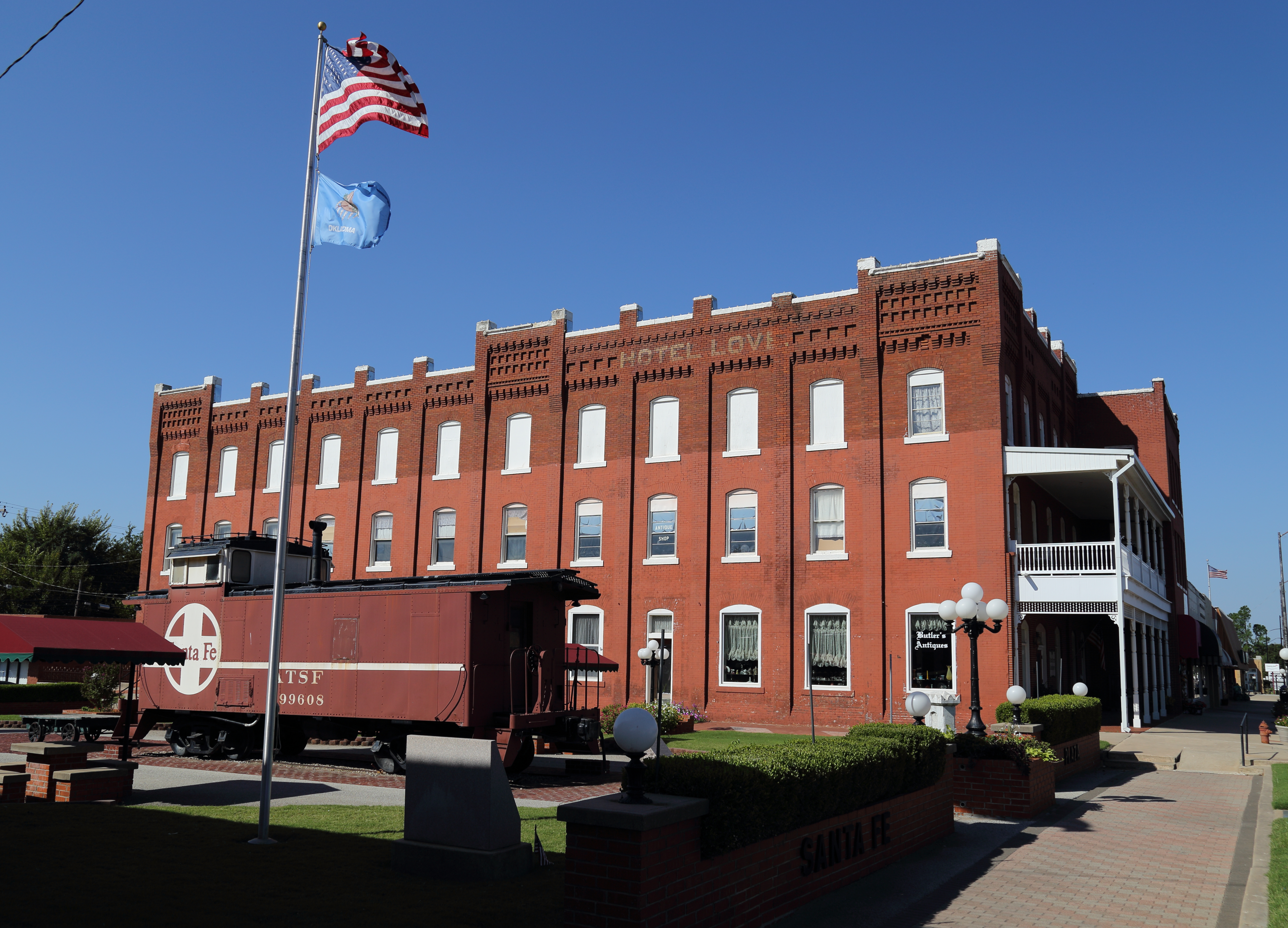
Love Hotel, Purcell

Frank Criner Love, Jr. was born in Purcell, Oklahoma, the son of Frank C. Love, Sr. and Louanna Edwards Love, and graduated in Law from the University of Oklahoma in 1930.

In 1895, his father built the historic landmark in downtown Purcell, Hotel Love and, according to his great-granddaughter Jenny Love Meyer, he owned a bank and several other businesses in Purcell.

== Career ==
In 1950, it was reported in the Daily Oklahoman, that "Frank C. Love, vice-president of Kerr-McGee Oil Industries, Inc., this week takes over as president of the new Deep Rock Oil Co. Love is a native of Purcell, graduated in law at University of Oklahoma and practiced in Oklahoma City in 1930-34, then joined Shell Oil."

In 1963, it was reported in the Daily Oklahoman, that "City industrialist Frank C. Love, 54, executive vice president of Kerr-McGee Industries, Inc., is a candidate for councilman in Ward 3 with the backing of the Association for Responsible Government."

Love was president of Kerr-McGee Corporation in, at least, 1968 and 1969.

== Personal life ==
On December 29, 1931, he married Margaret Eugenia Vessels (November 12, 1910 – January 31, 2005), the daughter of Tom and Kathryn Hoehn Vessels, who had been a fellow student at the University of Oklahoma, and they settled in Oklahoma City where they resided until his death in 1978. She was an ardent Catholic and converted her husband after eight years of marriage. In 1967, she was made a Lady of the Order of the Holy Sepulchre by the Pope, for her many years on the Pastoral Board of the Catholic Archdiocese of Oklahoma City.

They had seven children:

- William F. Love
- Sara Helen Gardiner
- Thomas E. Love (October 1937 – March 7, 2023), the billionaire owner, founder and chairman of Love's Travel Stops & Country Stores.
- Kathryn Ramseur
- Charles E. Love
- Margaret Goodman
- John J. Love

He died at the age of 70 on December 2, 1978, and is buried at the Resurrection Memorial Cemetery, Oklahoma City.
