= Who Does She Think She Is =

Who Does She Think She Is?
- Directed by: Pamela Tanner Boll
- Release date: 2008
- Running time: 1h 24m
- Country: United States
- Language: English

Who Does She Think She Is? is a 2008 American documentary film directed by Pamela Tanner Boll about the societal push for women to choose between art and motherhood and the struggle five female artists (Maye Torres, Angela Williams, Camille Musser, Mayumi Oda and Janis Mars Wunderlich) face in reconciling both parts of their lives. Boll was the co-executive producer of the 2005 Academy Award-winning documentary, Born Into Brothels.

== Content ==
The film follows five diverse women artists; Maye Torres, Mayumi Oda, Camille Musser, Angela Williams and Janis Mars Wunderlich, ranging in age from 27 to 65 from all over the United States as they chart a path to create their individual type of art while balancing the demands of motherhood and social expectations. By following the lives of these five artists, the film explores the intersections of motherhood and creativity, partnering and independence, economics and art, parenting and work. Who Does She Think She Is? looks at “the under-representation of mothers in the arts and other creative fields.”

In an interview with The Wall Street Journal, Boll says that a main theme connecting the women was the “idea of giving yourself permission to do that work you’re called to do.” According to The New York Times, the film “provides a nuanced look at the sacrifices and challenges facing female artists who become mothers.”

== Cast ==
Maye Torres, a full-time multimedia artist. She lives and works in Taos, New Mexico and Venice Beach, California. She has three children. Her career spans 37 years and her award-winning work is in public and private collections throughout the world.

Angela Williams, an actress and singer. Mother of two daughters.

Camille Musser, a painter and mother of two, Musser founded the Youlou Arts Foundation.

Mayumi Oda, a printmaker, activist and mother of two, was born in Japan. Oda’s art focuses primarily on goddess imagery.

Janis Wunderlich, a sculptor, mother of five, and full-time working artist. Wunderlich creates fairytale-esque creatures out of clay.

== Reception ==
One critic has stated, "It’s not every documentary that compels me to stay up writing most of the night and that weighs heavily on my mind for days. But, then again, Who Does She Think She Is? is not your average documentary."

There have been more mixed reviews, one magazine saying that the film has “revelatory moments” but also provides too restrictive a definition of “artist” and at times was “clumsily” composed.

The New York Times called the film an answer to the call of “self-expression in the face of biological imperatives and cultural programming.” The Village Voice has called it “a call to arms”. According to The Huffington Post, despite the films feminist stance, it produces and engaging story.
