= Flag of New Mexico =

U.S. state flag

State of New Mexico
- Zia Banner
- Use: Civil and state flag
- Proportion: 2:3
- Adopted: March 19, 1925; 101 years ago
- Design: The red and gold (yellow) of old Spain. The ancient Zia sun symbol in red on a field of yellow.
- Designed by: Reba Mera

The flag of the U.S. state of New Mexico, also referred to as the New Mexican flag and Zia Banner, is a state flag, consisting of a sacred red sun symbol of the Zia tribe on a field of gold (yellow). It was officially adopted on March 19, 1925 to highlight the state's Indigenous and Hispanic heritage: it combines a symbol of the Puebloan people, who have ancient roots in the state, with the colors of the flags of Spain, whose empire had established and ruled over “Nuevo México” for over two and a half centuries. The New Mexico flag is among the more distinctive and iconic in the U.S., and has been noted for its simple and aesthetically pleasing design. It is one of four U.S. state flags without the color blue (along with Alabama, California, and Maryland) and the only one among the four without the color white. (Note: The flag of the District of Columbia also has no blue, although it is partially white, making the New Mexico flag the only U.S. flag without blue or white.) New Mexico is one of only two U.S states (along with Oklahoma) that depicts indigenous iconography in its flag. (Note: The Massachusetts and Florida flags contain state seals depicting Native people.)

== Statute ==
Flag of the Tercios Morados Viejos (old purple third (meaning regiment)) during New Spain.

The 2024 New Mexico Statutes, Chapter 12, Article 3, § 12-3-2 defines the state flag as follows:

the ancient Zia sun symbol of red in the center of a field of yellow. The colors shall be the red and yellow of old Spain. The proportion of the flag shall be a width of two-thirds its length. The sun symbol shall be one-third of the length of the flag. Said symbol shall have four groups of rays set at right angles; each group shall consist of four rays, the two inner rays of the group shall be one-fifth longer than the outer rays of the group. The diameter of the circle in the center of the symbol shall be one-third of the width of the symbol.

== Symbolism ==
The Zia sun symbol has sacred meaning to the indigenous Zia people. Four is a sacred number symbolizing the Circle of Life: the four directions, the four times of day, the four stages of life, and the four seasons; the circle binds these four elements of four together. It has since become representative of the broader Puebloan, Hispano, and Native-led New Mexican culture.

== History ==
=== The "Twitchell flag" (1915) ===
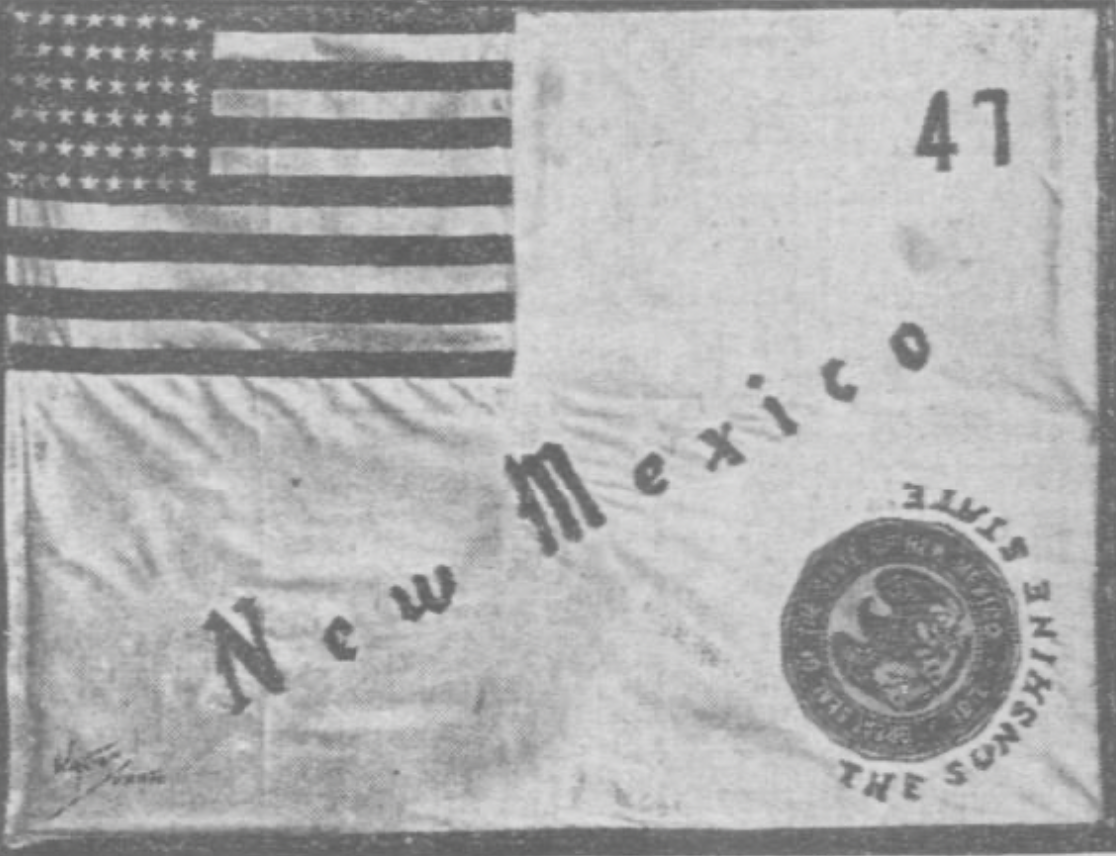
A version of the flag when it was legislatively adopted in 1915

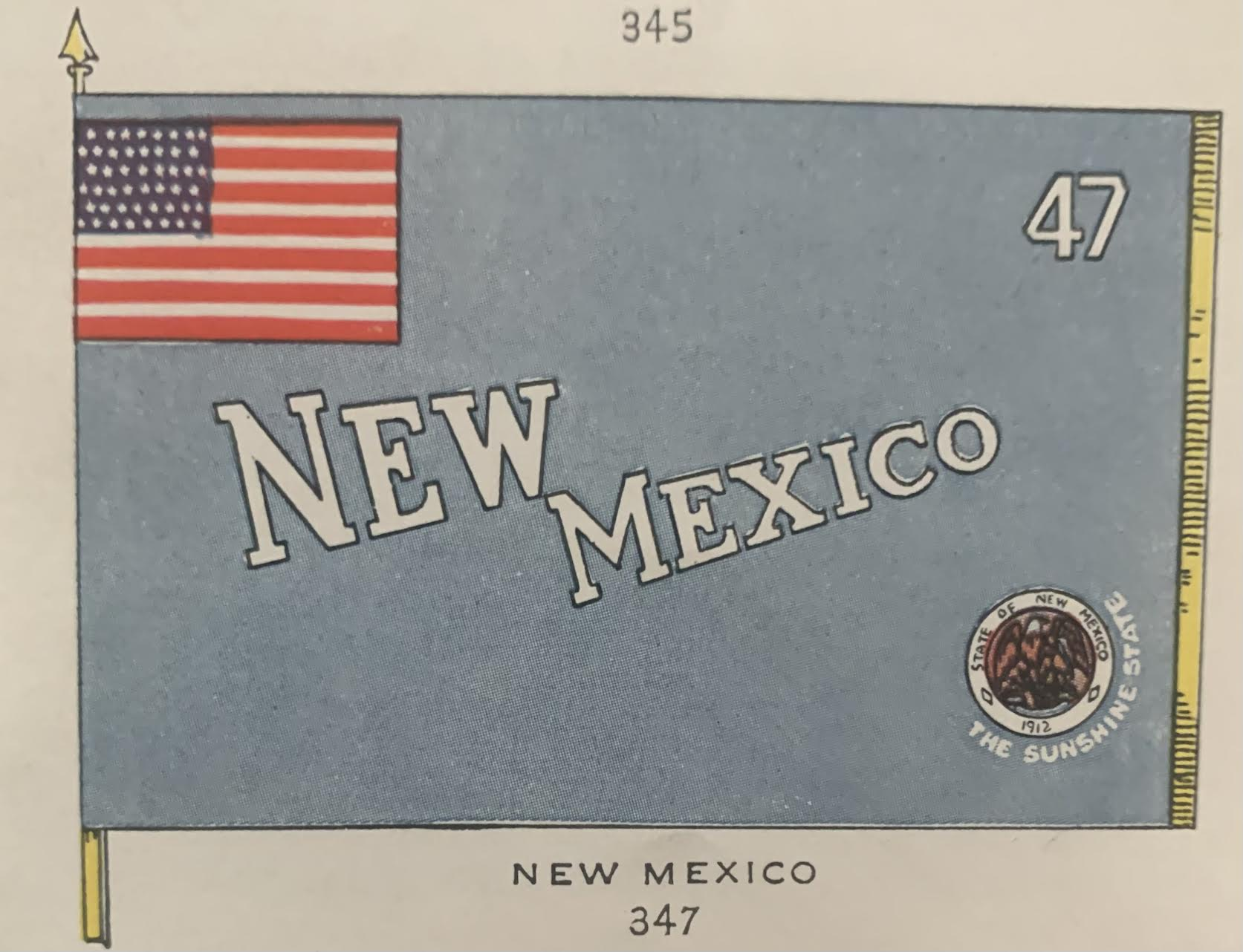
The Twitchell flag as it appeared in National Geographic, 1917

During its first thirteen years as a state, New Mexico did not have an official flag. Although there is a mention of a state flag being displayed at a ball in 1911, its design is unknown.

The San Diego World's Fair of 1915, which occurred three years after New Mexico's admission to the union, featured an exhibit hall where all U.S. state flags were displayed. Lacking an official flag, Ralph Emerson Twitchell, the mayor of Santa Fe, was authorized to design the first state flag of New Mexico to be displayed. When the flag law was passed, the flag attached to the bill was ordered to be placed with the Secretary of State, to be properly preserved in the state archives. (Note: The 1917 article contains numerous fictional or assumed designs for states that had not yet adopted flags. NatGeo's artist and writer filled in missing data to create a "complete" set of designs for the article. In the text, New Mexico is also referred to as "the Commonwealth", which may be sign that NatGeo reused language written originally for Kentucky, Pennsylvania, or other states that are commonwealths.)

Known as the "Twitchell flag", its design consisted of a turquoise or turqoiuse blue field, emblematic of the state's blue skies; the U.S. flag in the upper left corner, "designating the loyalty of the people of the state to the Union"; diagonally across the field, stretching from the lower left to the upper right, are the words "New Mexico" in white or silver lettering; the number "47" in the upper right corner, in reference to New Mexico being the 47th state to enter the union; and the state seal (sometimes in red) in the lower right corner, which in some historical references is wrapped with the words "The Sunshine State".

As of 2005, the only known Twitchell flag in existence was displayed at the Palace of the Governors in Santa Fe.

=== Current flag (1925–present) ===
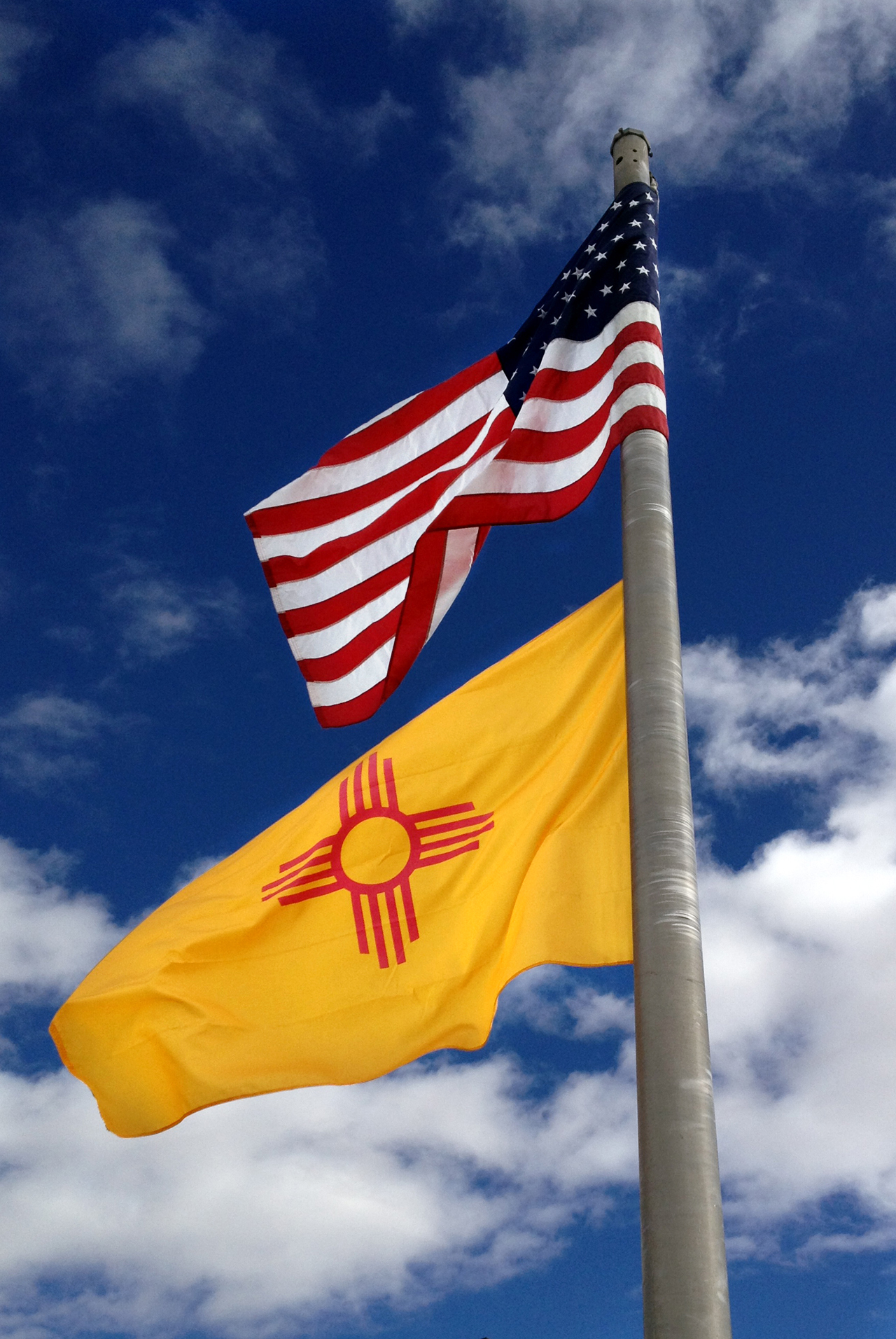
U.S. and New Mexican flags flying near Deming, February 2014.

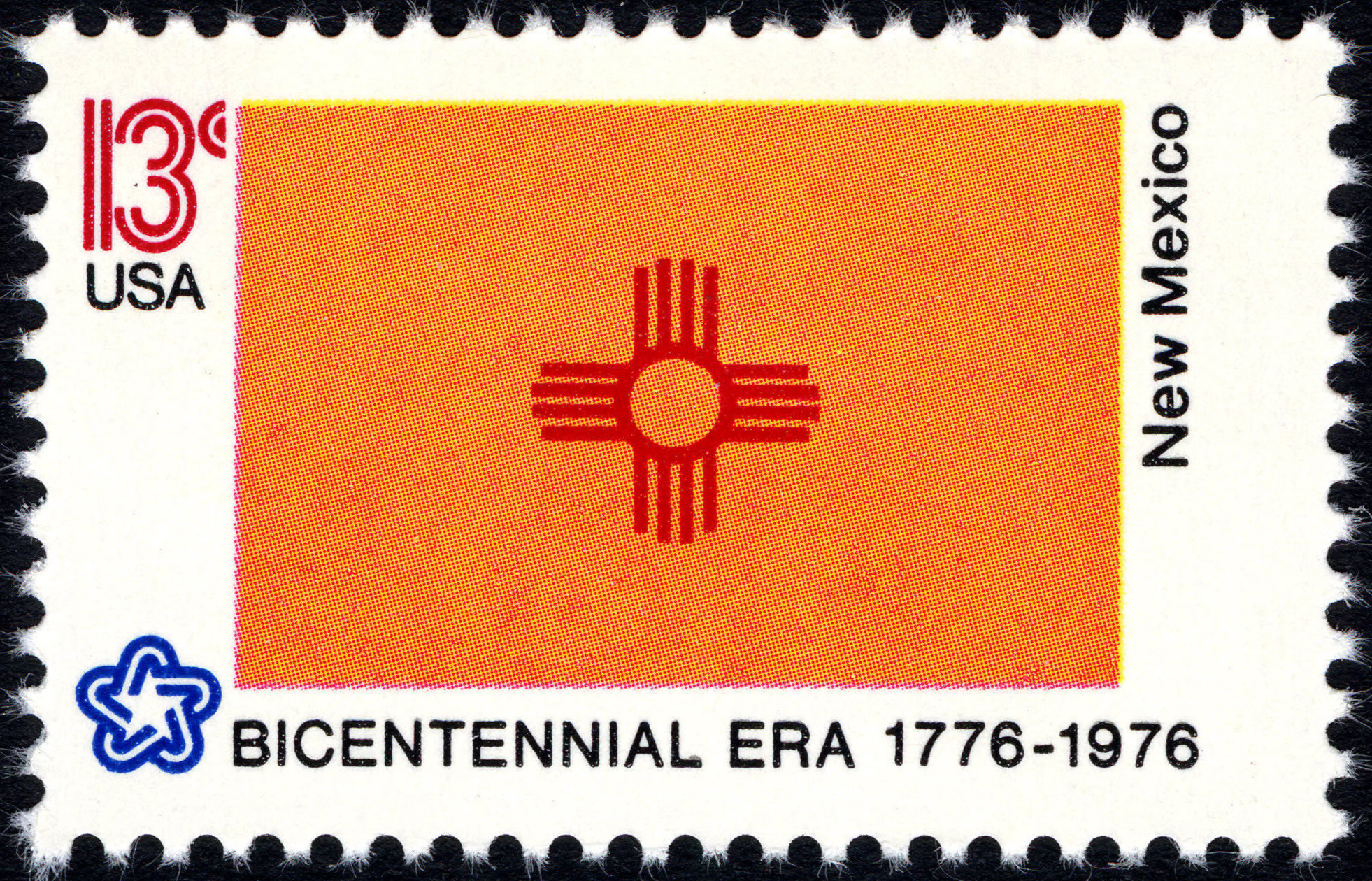
The New Mexico state flag as depicted in the US bicentennial postage stamp series in 1976.

In 1920, the New Mexico chapter of the Daughters of the American Revolution (DAR) called for the creation of an official flag that would reflect the state's unique heritage and culture. A statewide contest was held in 1923 to solicit new designs. Eventually, a design made by Harry Mera of Santa Fe and sewn by his wife Reba Mera was selected. In 1925, Governor Arthur T. Hannett signed legislation proclaiming the Mera design the official state flag, which remains in use and unchanged to this day.

Mera was a physician and archaeologist who became familiar with the Zia sun symbol, which he encountered on a piece of pottery originating from Zia Pueblo. This pottery, believed to date from before 1890 and associated with the Zia Fire Society, had made its way into private collections during a period when early ethnographers were conducting intensive fieldwork in the region.

The symbol was used without consulting the Zia people, and they have fought to prevent it from being used without their permission, including via attempting to copyright it, during and after its adoption as a symbol of the state, and due to concerns over desecration of the symbol. A 2012 joint memorial by the state and the Zia people later acknowledged the state had appropriated the image without permission.

Although the Zia Pueblo does not hold a trademark on the symbol, the state of New Mexico supports respectful use by guiding individuals and organizations to Zia Pueblo and the Indian Pueblo Cultural Center in Albuquerque, offering information encouraging honoring the symbol's origins and meaning.

The New Mexico flag was rated first in a 2001 survey of 72 U.S. and Canadian flags by the North American Vexillological Association. The flag has always been free for civil and state use, and it is completely in the public domain as of January 1, 2021.

The flag is worn on uniforms by sailors aboard the submarine USS New Mexico (SSN-779).

== Pledge ==
The pledge to the state flag is available in English and Spanish:

I salute the flag of the state of New Mexico, the Zia symbol of perfect friendship among united cultures.

— New Mexico Statutes and Court Rules, Section 12-3-3

Saludo la bandera del estado de Nuevo México, el símbolo zía de amistad perfecta, entre culturas unidas.

— New Mexico Statutes and Court Rules, Section 12-3-7

The salutation, "I salute the flag of the State of New Mexico and the Zia symbol of perfect friendship among united cultures", is commonly recited in New Mexico public schools after the United States pledge of allegiance.

== See also ==
- Great Seal of the State of New Mexico
- Flag of the Navajo Nation
