= Flag of Madison, Wisconsin =

- Adopted: July 24, 2018; 8 years ago
- Design: A light blue background with a diagonal white stripe from the bottom left corner to the top right corner, with a black cross and yellow circle in the center

The flag of Madison, Wisconsin, includes a sky blue background with a diagonal white stripe that goes from the bottom left corner to the top right which symbolizes Lake Mendota, Lake Monona and the isthmus between them. At the center of the flag is a black cross, which symbolizes the four lakes (Mendota, Monona, Kegonsa, and Waubesa), as well as the cross shape of the Wisconsin State Capitol. The gold circle in the middle represents the Wisconsin State Capitol's dome.

== History ==
Original flag of Madison, Wisconsin (1962–2018)

Rick and Dennis Stone who were members of the Madison Scouts Drum and Bugle Corps designed the flag with their color guard instructor John Price. In the original design, adopted by the municipal government on April 12, 1962, the shape overlaid on the cross was a Zia sun symbol, sacred to the Native American Zia people of New Mexico. While Madison's flag designers intended to represent an "Indian sun symbol", it is not used by any of the Native American groups in the Wisconsin area, and the flag designers were unaware that it was specifically Puebloan or New Mexican.

In a 2004 poll conducted by the North American Vexillological Association, the flag of Madison was rated 11th best of 150 major cities in the United States.

Madison's flag experienced a resurgence beginning in 2015, when Madison Alder Maurice Cheeks authored and passed a resolution to require the flag to be flown on city property as part of a campaign to increase awareness of the symbol of local pride. That increased exposure led to concerns about the "cultural appropriation" of a symbol sacred to the Zia, as well as other Pueblo, mestizo Hispano, and many other native affiliated New Mexican people, so in 2017 Cheeks joined with fellow Alder Arvina Martin in spearheading an effort to modify the design of the flag. Original designer Rick Stone was publicly supportive of the efforts, "as long as it doesn’t significantly change the flag’s design or (make) it look completely different." The Common Council settled on a design that replaced the sacred Zia sun symbol with a gold disc. Their bill was supported by Mayor Paul Soglin and was unanimously passed by the council on July 24, 2018. After the vote passed, Martin presented the Stone brothers with the first copy of the new flag.

== Use ==
The city's professional soccer team, Forward Madison FC, incorporates the city flag into its main logo, and its home jersey is sky blue with a white diagonal sash to mimic Madison's flag.
