= Alison Fields =

American art historian

- Born: Alison Lynne Fields; August 1, 1979 (age 47); United States
- Occupations: Art historian Educator

Academic background
- Education: Colgate University; Brown University; University of New Mexico
- Thesis: False Closure: Narratives of Trauma, Healing, and American Nationhood (2009)

Academic work
- Discipline: Art history
- Sub-discipline: American Studies
- Institutions: University of Oklahoma

Alison Lynne Fields (born August 1, 1979) is an American art historian and educator. Fields is currently the Mary Lou Milner Carver Professor of Art of the American West at University of Oklahoma.

== Career ==
Fields received a Bachelor of Arts in English and Native American studies from Colgate University in 2001. There, she was part of the Student Government Association. Fields then proceeded to receive a Master of Arts in American civilization from Brown University in 2003, and a Doctor of Philosophy in American studies from the University of New Mexico in 2009. Fields wrote a doctoral dissertation titled False Closure: Narratives of Trauma, Healing, and American Nationhood. Following graduation, she was hired as the Mary Lou Milner Carver Professor of Art of the American West at University of Oklahoma. Additionally, Fields began serving as associate editor of the journal Western Historical Quarterly in 2016, and two years later, was associate director of the School of Visual Arts.

== See also ==
- List of Brown University alumni
- List of Colgate University people
- List of University of New Mexico alumni
- List of University of Oklahoma people
