= Edwin George =

Edwin George

Edwin George (1934 - June 30, 2022) was a Cherokee folk artist and muralist.

== Personal life ==
George was born and raised in Cherokee, North Carolina, in a home that spoke only Cherokee. He was a member of the sovereign nation of the Eastern Band of Cherokee Indians. He married author Elly-Kree McKay George, and he was the step-grandfather of ceramic sculptor Janis Mars Wunderlich.

== Career ==
George worked as a custodian at Kent State University from 1983 to 1998. He began painting in 1991, and took it up full time upon his retirement. He was also sought after as one of the few speakers of the Cherokee language.

== Awards and recognition ==
- 2011 Ohio Heritage Fellowship Recipient

== Murals ==
- Harrah's Cherokee Casino Resort lobby, Cherokee, North Carolina
- 2005 - Kent, Ohio
