= Elizabeth Medina =

Potter

Elizabeth Toya Medina (born November 30, 1956, Jemez Pueblo) is a Pueblo potter. She married into the Zia tribe in 1978 and, as is traditional, gained tribal permission to use Zia designs in her work. Her first pots were in the Jemez style. In some instances she has collaborated with her mother-in-law, Sofia Medina, whom she cites as her inspiration.

Medina has been recognized widely for her work. She has been featured in numerous publications (including New Mexico Magazine, August 1994:36, and SWAIA Quarterly Fall 1982:10), galleries (Native American Collections in Denver, CO; Adobe Gallery and Agape Gallery in Albuquerque, NM), and museums (Wright Collection, Peabody Museum, Harvard University, Cambridge, MA; Spurlock Museum, University of Illinois at Urbana-Champaign). She has received many awards from 1984 to the present.

== Pottery style and technique ==
Medina is particularly known for her polychrome ollas and jars, featuring cream-colored and tan slips that her mother-in-law also uses, as well as rose-red and orange slips. Her favorite designs include roadrunners, robins, berry bushes, flowers, rain clouds, rainbows, fineline hatching, and turtle effigy lids. Occasionally she produces plain pots for her husband Marcellus to paint with designs of Zia dancers.

She uses a combination of sheep and cow manure to fire her pots. To achieve a white background color instead of blue, the manure must be completely dry. One way to protect the pots from fire smudges is through the reuse of everyday objects such as old bedsprings and auto shock absorbers.

Zia pots are unique in that they are tempered with basalt, a hard volcanic rock. Medina has been known to bury the rock in sand for a full year in order to soften it for grinding.
