= Chester's =

American restaurant chain

- Industry: QSR franchise
- Founded: October 1965; 61 years ago in Montgomery, Alabama, United States
- Founder: W.O. Giles
- Headquarters: Birmingham, Alabama, United States
- Website: www.chesterschicken.com

Chester's International, known as Chester's or Chester's Chicken, is a fried chicken quick-service restaurant chain based in Birmingham, Alabama, United States. W.O. Giles founded Chester's in October 1965 and adopted Chester the Chicken as the emerging foodservice company's mascot, named for the Chester Goode character on Gunsmoke, a favorite TV show of Giles'. In late 2012, the company moved its headquarters to the Birmingham suburb of Mountain Brook, Alabama.

== Locations ==
The company began franchising its concept in July 2004 and has grown to in-line locations in shopping plazas and mall food courts. According to Entrepreneur, As of November 2022, the chain has more than 1,098 locations across the United States, many of which are located and Love's travel stops alongside other national restaurant chains.

== Gallery ==
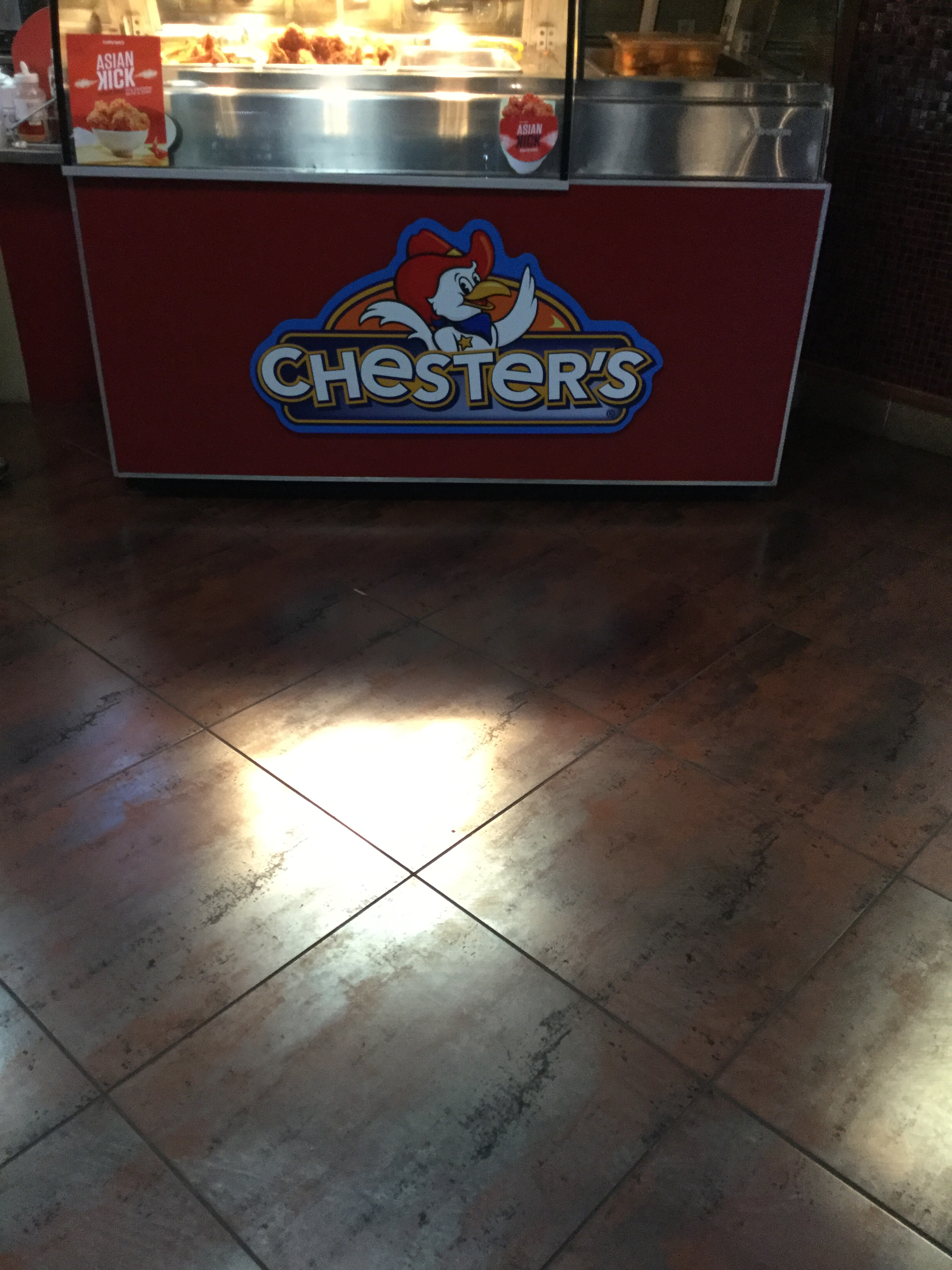
Chester's Chicken counter

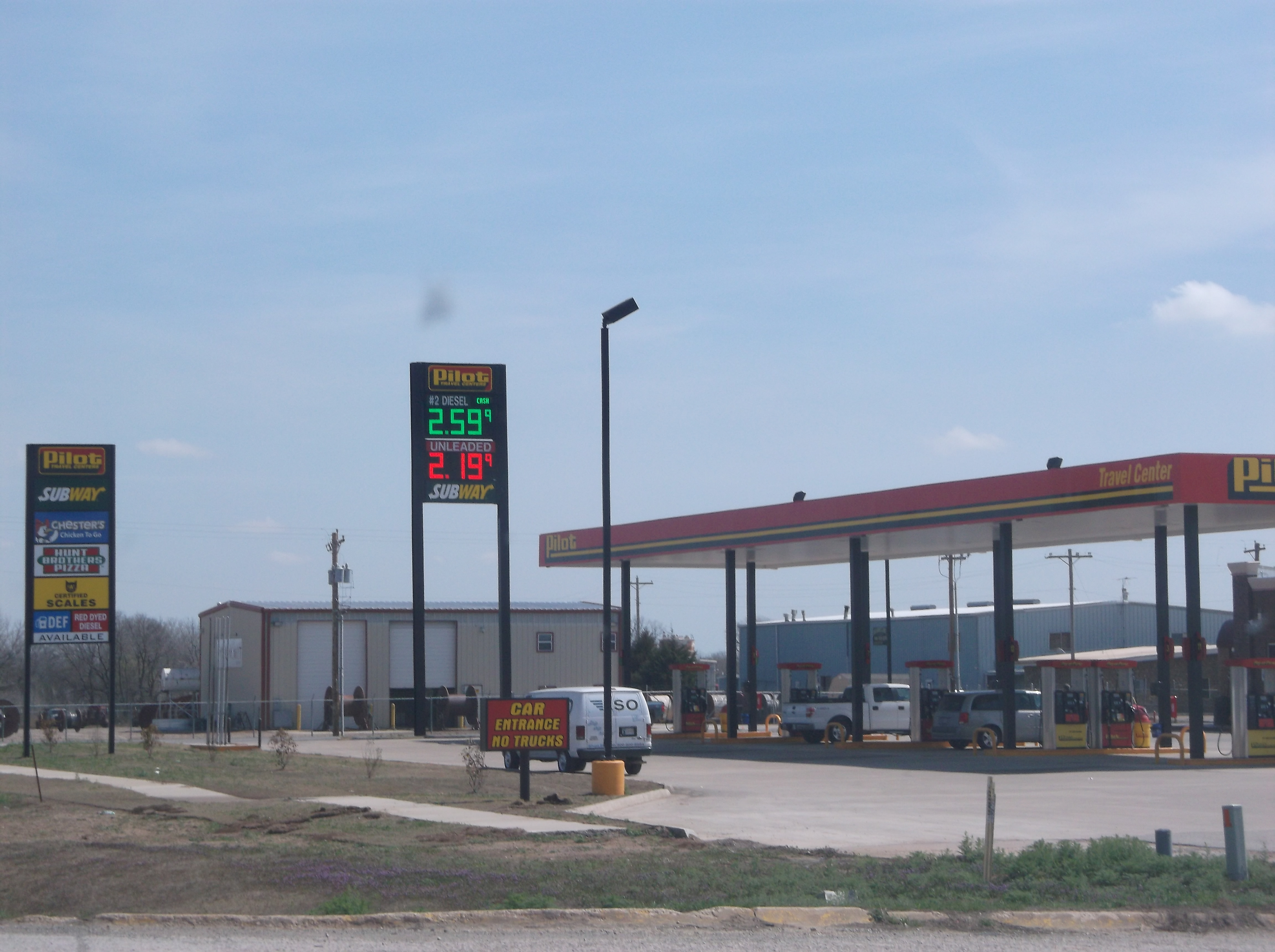
Pilot truck stop with Chester's Chicken

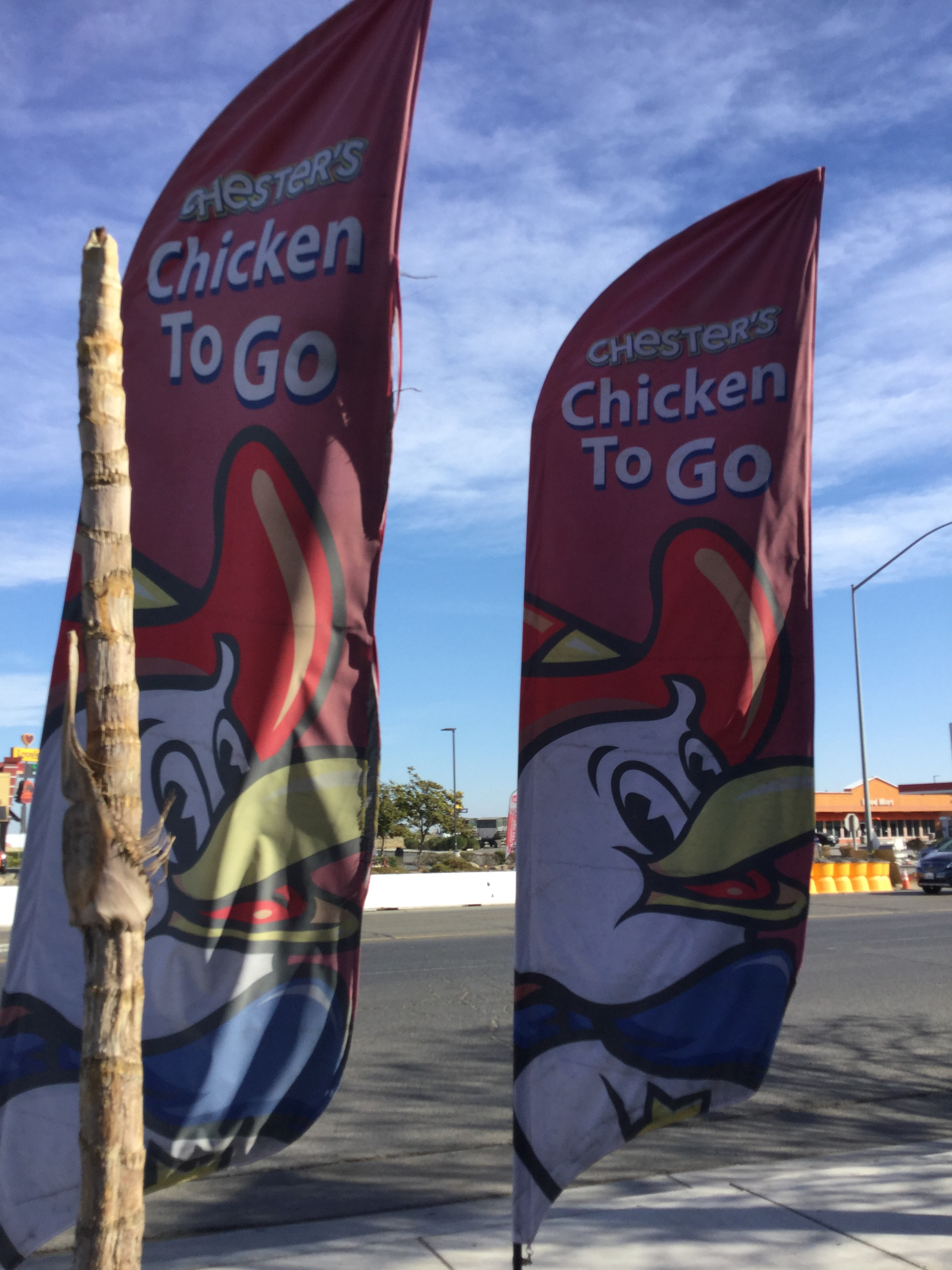
Banners advertising Chester's Chicken

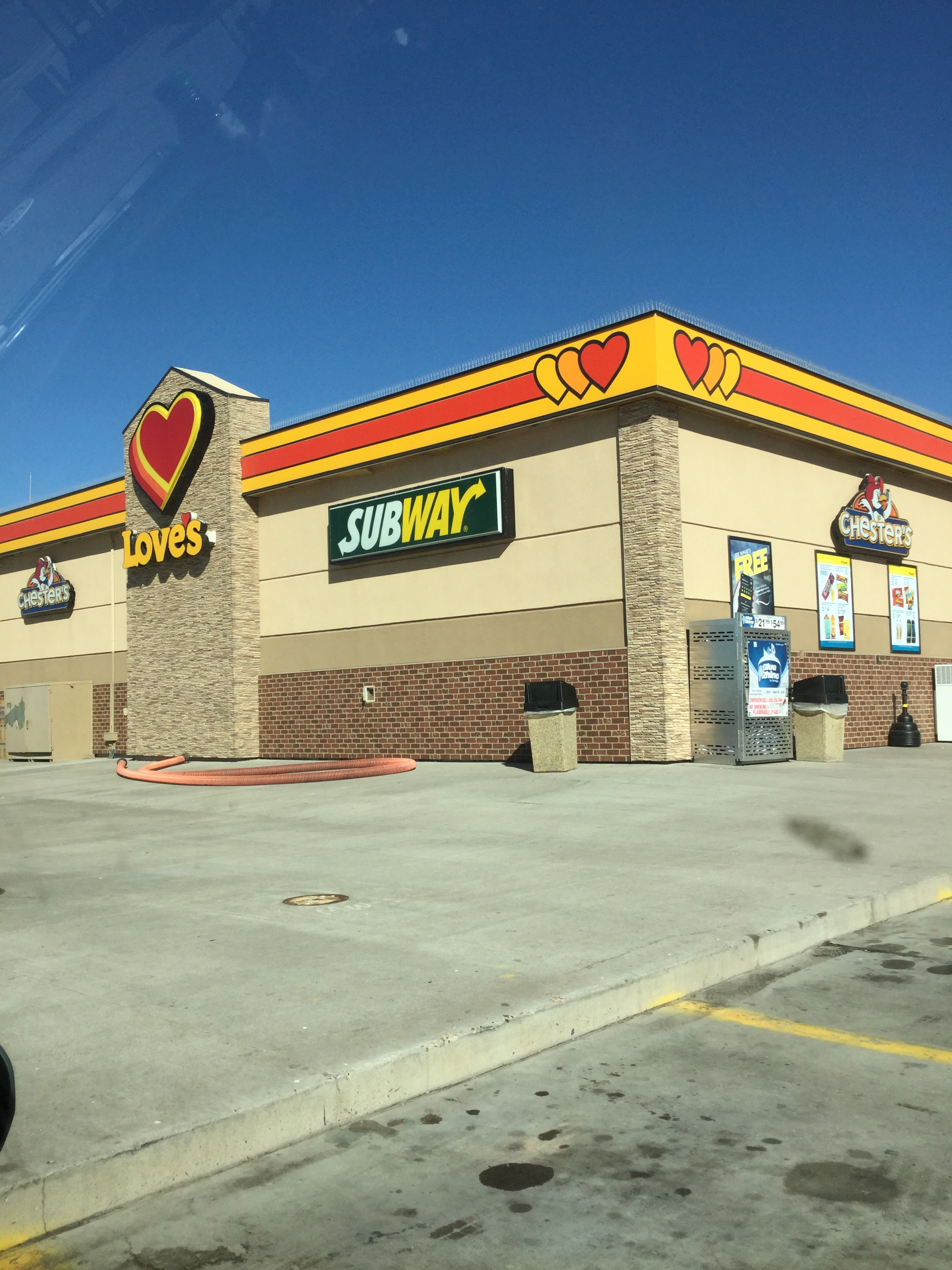
A Love's travel stop with a Subway and a Chester's Chicken restaurant

== See also ==
- List of chicken restaurants
