= Janis Mars Wunderlich =

American artist

- Born: Akron, Ohio, U.S.
- Education: Brigham Young University, Ohio State University
- Known for: Ceramics, painting
- Website: janismarswunderlich.com

Janis Mars Wunderlich (born 1970) is a ceramic artist, currently an assistant professor of art at Monmouth College.

Wunderlich was born in Akron, Ohio and received a BFA (Bachelor of Fine Arts) from Brigham Young University and an MFA (Master of Fine Arts) from Ohio State University. As she raised five children, Wunderlich established an art career both in the gallery and as a college professor. As of 2020, she is an assistant professor of art history, ceramics, and art foundations at Monmouth College in Monmouth, Illinois.

== Art ==
Wunderlich's preferred mediums are clay and printmaking. Her work is a distinctive mix of styles and themes and a special emphasis on motherhood. She has been the recipient of fellowships from the Ohio Arts Council and the Greater Columbus Arts Council. She spent a summer in Dresden, Germany on a residency studying modern and historic techniques of porcelain figurine manufacturing at the Meissen Factory in Meissen, Germany. She has been featured in Ceramics Monthly, The Best of New Ceramic Art, 500 Figures in Clay, and Dialogue Journal. In 2019, Wunderlich premiered her exhibit "Deep" in the Western Illinois University's Heating Plant Annex Gallery.

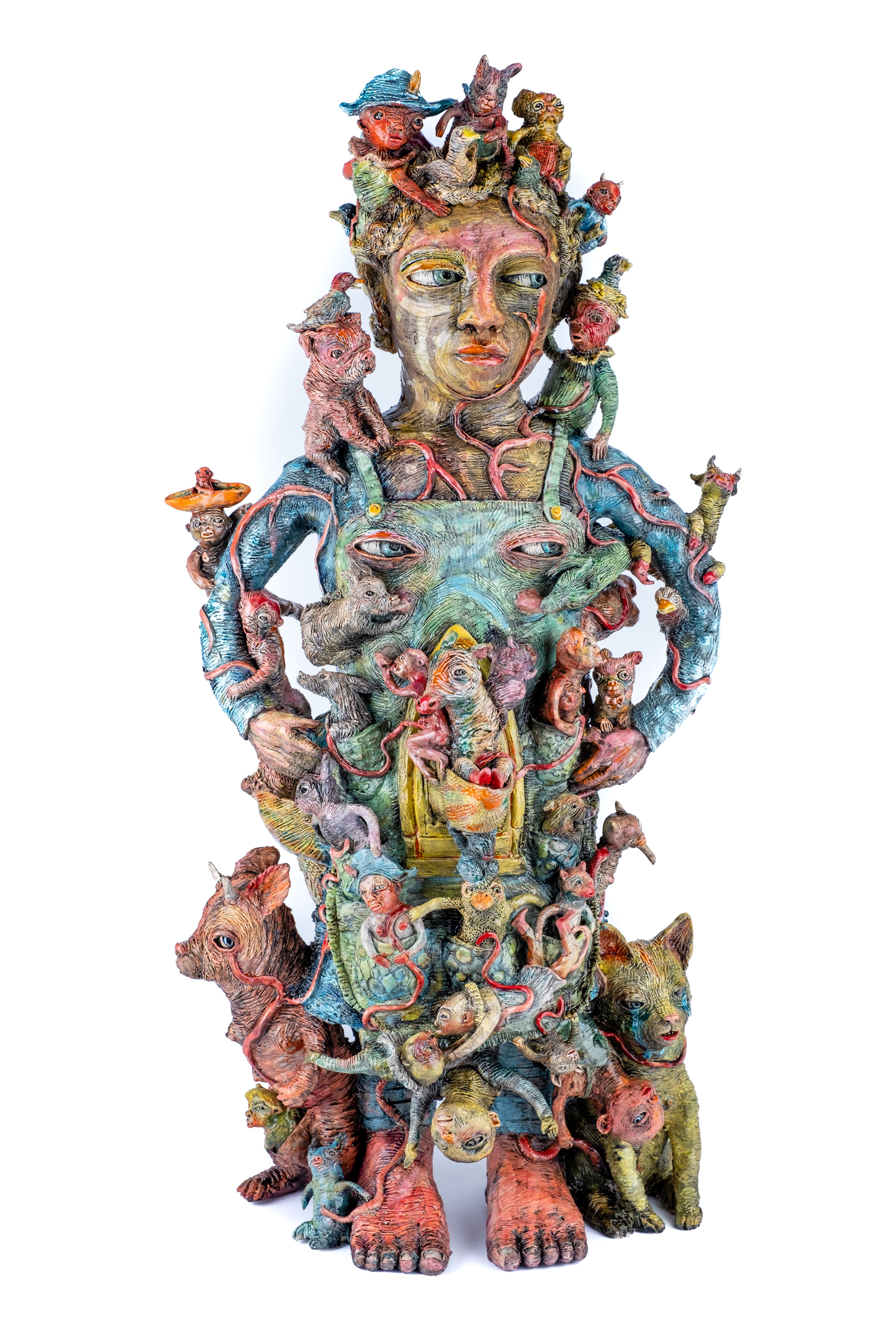
Apron Strings, ceramic sculpture by Janis Mars Wunderlich

== Recognition ==
She was profiled in a documentary Who Does She Think She Is? about the societal push for women to choose between art and motherhood and the struggle five female artists (Maye Torres, Angela Williams, Camille Musser, Mayumi Oda and Janis Mars Wunderlich) face in reconciling both parts of their lives. The New York Times said of her part in the film, “Janis Wunderlich, on the other hand, seems cheerfully adept at managing five children, a husband and a successful career as a sculptor.”

== Personal life ==
Wunderlich is the mother of five children. Wunderlich is a member of the Church of Jesus Christ of Latter-day Saints. She is the step-granddaughter of folk artist Edwin George. She is also a Boston-qualifying marathon runner.

As she raised her children, Wunderlich located her studio in the corner of her dining room so she was only a few steps from access to her art. She would work in the early mornings, during nap times, and after children went to bed.
