= Kelli Masters =

American sports agent

Kelli Masters is an American sports agent and lawyer. She was the first woman to represent an NFL draft pick.

== Biography ==
Masters was born in Oklahoma City and raised in Tahlequah. She is a member of the Cherokee Nation. After graduating from Midwest City High School in 1991, she studied law at the University of Oklahoma.

While studying at the University of Oklahoma, Masters also competed as a baton twirler and beauty queen. She won the title of Miss Oklahoma in 1997, and later competed in the Miss America pageant. Masters became the first woman to represent an NFL draft pick after signing Gerald McCoy in 2010. Masters later said that she faced sexism as a woman in the industry, and has spoken about the obstacles facing women in the NFL. She had initially been discouraged from entering the field by male colleagues. In 2014, Bleacher Report named Masters as one of the 25 Most Powerful Women in Sports. In 2021, Masters published the autobiographical book High Impact Life.

She is also an annual "NFL Combine Football Career Conference" speaker for the online sports-career training school Sports Management Worldwide, founded and run by Dr. Lynn Lashbrook.
