= Robert O'Neil Bristow =

American novelist

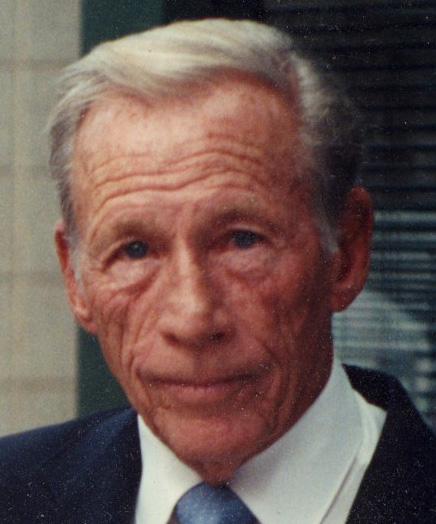
- Bristow in Chapel Hill, North Carolina in 2000
- Born: November 17, 1926; St. Louis, Missouri, U.S.
- Died: August 15, 2018 (aged 91); Rock Hill, South Carolina, U.S.
- Education: Classen High School; University of Oklahoma
- Occupation: Novelist
- Spouse(s): Gaylon Eva Walker (m. 1950; div. 1973) Gail Hamiter Rosen (m. 2003; div. 2008)
- Children: 4
- Parent(s): Jesse Reuben Bristow; Helen Margorie Utley
- Relatives: Benjamin Bristow (cousin); Gwen Bristow (cousin)

Robert O'Neil Bristow (November 17, 1926 – August 15, 2018) was an American novelist known for depicting the lives of Black Americans in small town South Carolina during the years surrounding desegregation. His novel Time for Glory (1968, William Morrow & Co.) received the University of Oklahoma award for literary excellence and was designated as recommended reading by the Black Panther Party and the Christian Book List.

== Early years ==
Robert O'Neil Bristow (Bob Bristow) was born to advertising executive Jesse Reuben Bristow and Helen Margorie (Utley) Bristow in St. Louis, Missouri, and was the older brother to Margorie Bristow Allen. The family moved to Oklahoma City, Oklahoma, during the Depression where Bristow graduated from Classen High School in 1942. He joined the Navy at the age of 17 and served as a Navy corpsman during WWII. He attended the University of Oklahoma, where he was head cheerleader and received a degree in journalism in 1951, after which he took a job at the Altus Times Democrat newspaper in Altus, Oklahoma, the home of his wife Gaylon.

In 1953, he quit his job and moved Gaylon and their two daughters into a 3-room migrant house on the outskirts of Altus where the rent was $10/month so he could devote his full time to writing short stories. The house had no street address and no running water. He became friends with local migrant workers, many of whom attended the local A.M.E. Pleasant Chapel Church which had an assigned circuit minister for only one service per month. In 1956, because the local all white Methodist church refused to allow Black Americans to attend church services, Bristow volunteered to act as lay minister at the A.M.E. church for three Sundays per month and was joined on those Sundays by Gaylon and his then three young children. It was this experience at the A.M.E. church that motivated his efforts in the early 1960s to educate White Americans about Black American lives.

== Career ==
Bristow returned to the University of Oklahoma in 1960, where he received a master's degree in journalism. For his master's thesis, he conducted interviews about story outcomes and demonstrated that people will choose the morally right outcome versus the morally wrong outcome regardless of their personal choices to partake in illegal activities such as prostitution. This divergence between "cash-register honesty" and "emotional honesty" lay the groundwork for the characters and plots in his fiction.

Bristow moved his family to Rock Hill, South Carolina, in 1961, where he became writer-in-residence and professor in the Dept. of Communications at Winthrop University until he retired in 1987. He published more than 135 short stories and six novels. Many of his short stories were published in Alfred Hitchcock's Mystery Magazine! as well as Alfred Hitchcock mystery collections. One story, "And Practically Strangers," originally published in Redbook magazine as "Hero's Reward," was aired on Schlitz Playhouse in 1959.

Bristow's short story publishing success attracted the attention of his future agent Shirley Burke who introduced him to his future editor Millen Brand. Bristow's first hardback novel, Time for Glory (1968, William Morrow & Co.), published in the same year that Martin Luther King, Jr. was assassinated, received the University of Oklahoma award for literary excellence. The novel is a story of a Black American, Sammy Apodaca, who risks his life to save White American children from a burning school bus and, as a consequence, becomes an unwitting hero in a white society that attempts to use him to promote a false perception of racial equality and white generosity. One of the first novels to give insight into the lives of Southern Black Americans, the novel was recommended reading by the Black Panther Party, was advertised by Ebony magazine, and is held in the Charles L. Blockson Afro-American Collection, Temple University, Philadelphia, PA.

Bristow's second hardback novel, Night Season, (1970, William Morrow & Co) was chosen as a Literary Guild Alternate Selection to provide high-impact advertising. Night Season is a story of a college educated Black American, Toby Snow, who makes a living as a sign painter, and the woman who loves him, Roxanne, a prostitute.

Bristow's third hardback novel, A Faraway Drummer (1973, Crown Publishers) is a story that reveals the traps of loyalty and responsibility in small town South Carolina. His fourth novel, Laughter in Darkness (1974, Crown Publishers) is a story of a blind professor and reveals mankind's psychological need for emotional honesty

Bristow's short story, "Beyond Any Doubt" from Alfred Hitchcock's Mystery Magazine 7, no.1 (January 1962) was selected for inclusion in a collection of essays and stories about law through history, Law: A Treasury of Art and Literature, 1990,(Ed. Sara Robbins), Hugh Lauter Levin Associates, Inc., Fairfield, CT, ISBN 0-88363-300-0 (p. 316-322).

Bristow is listed in Marquis Who's Who in the World. After retiring as writer-in-residence, Bristow took a position as assistant tennis coach at Winthrop University. It was during his time with the tennis team that the Winthrop Men's team was involved in a tragic accident and Bristow was credited with saving the life of one of the team members by using his Navy corpsman training.

== Personal life ==
Bristow's American ancestor Robert Bristow of Ayot St. Lawrence and Little Bibbesworth, England (b. 1596) was granted land between the Potomac and Rappahannock Rivers in the mid-1600s. Descendants of the first American Robert Bristow took both sides in the Revolutionary War and fought on both sides of the Civil War. Benjamin Helm Bristow, a cousin, was Secretary of the Treasury under President Ulysses S. Grant. Gwen Bristow, a cousin, was a best selling novelist. Dr. Louis Judson Bristow, father of Gwen Bristow, founded and led South Carolina Baptist Hospital in 1914 in Columbia, SC, founded and led Good Samaritan Hospital for African-Americans in Selma, AL in 1922., and founded and led Southern Baptist Hospital in 1924 in New Orleans, LA, now known as Ochsner Medical Center.

Bristow was born November 17, 1926, in St. Louis, MO, and died August 15, 2018, in Rock Hill, SC. Bristow married Gaylon Eva Walker of Altus, OK, in 1950, and they divorced in 1973. Gaylon edited and typed all of Bristow's published manuscripts. Children from the marriage are Dr. Cynthia Lynn Bristow, also listed in Marquis Who's Who in the World, CEO, Alpha-1 Biologics, Stony Brook, NY; Margery Jan Bristow, speech pathologist and member of Threshold Singers; Gregory Scott Bristow, professional musician and music teacher; Kelly Robert Bristow, professional musician and sound engineer. Bristow married Gail Hamiter Rosen in 2003, and they divorced in 2008.
