= Christopher Andronicos =

American geologist

Christopher L. Andronicos (born December 1968 in Albuquerque, New Mexico, US) is an American geologist and former associate professor of Geology at Purdue University.

== Biography ==
He is the son of Domingo Montoya, former governor of Sandia Pueblo, and Maria Flying Horse, a Native American artist. He graduated from Del Norte High School in 1987 and earned a geology degree from the University of New Mexico in 1995. He then attended Princeton University where he received a National Science Foundation Graduate Fellowship and Princeton's Dodson Fellowship, completing his PhD in 1999.

Andronicos then took a position as an assistant professor at the University of Texas at El Paso. In 2005, he joined Cornell University, where he was affiliated with the Institute for the Study of the Continents, the Department of Earth and Atmospheric Sciences, and the American Indian Program. In 2012, Andronicos accepted a position as an associate professor at Purdue University in the Department of Earth, Atmospheric, and Planetary Sciences.

His research is focused on understanding high temperature deformation in the deep crust and upper mantle. He has focused his work on continental orogenic belts in the southwestern United States, western Canada, and the Tibetan plateau. He has recently begun work on the Oman Ophiolite complex which provides access to rocks which once made up the Oceanic crust and upper mantle. He has published in journals including Nature, Tectonics, Terra Nova, and Earth and Planetary Science Letters and has received funding from the National Science Foundation for his research. His work in western Canada has been influential in both understanding magmatic arcs and the paleogeography of North America.
