= Marcelina Herrera =

Native American painter

- Born: c. 1916; Zia Pueblo, New Mexico
- Known for: Painting

Figurative painting by Marcelina Herrera, 1936, showing her use of pattern.

Marcelina Herrera (born c. 1916), also called Hawelana or Ha-we-la-na, was an American painter from the Zia Pueblo tribe known for her flat painting style and use of pattern. From 1934 to 1937, she studied at the Santa Fe Indian School in Santa Fe, New Mexico at The Studio under Dorothy Dunn. Herrera went on to study at the University of New Mexico in Albuquerque. Her work has been exhibited at the National Gallery of Art in Washington, D.C.

In 1936, Herrera wrote, "The modern Paintings [sic] consist of ceremonies and other dances. They paint the things they do in every day life. Some of the animals and some scenes are similar to Persian paintings. Designs that the modern painters paint are purely abstract. None of the paintings are realistic. Beautiful paintings are produced more and more which emphasizes, that the Indian art is rising again."
