= Tom Love =

American billionaire businessman (1937–2023)

- Born: October 1937; Oklahoma City, Oklahoma, U.S.
- Died: March 7, 2023 (aged 85); Oklahoma City, Oklahoma, U.S.
- Education: St. Gregory's High School
- Alma mater: St. John's University (dropped out); University of Oklahoma (dropped out)
- Occupations: Executive Chairman, Love's Travel Stops & Country Stores
- Spouse: Judy Love
- Children: 4
- Parent: F. C. Love

Thomas E. Love (October 1937 – March 7, 2023), was an American billionaire businessman. He was the founder, owner, and executive chairman of Love's Travel Stops & Country Stores.

== Early life ==
Thomas E. Love was born in Oklahoma City in October 1937, one of six siblings. He was the son of F. C. Love, a lawyer who was later president of the oil company Kerr-McGee, and Margaret Eugenia Vessels Love. Thomas was the descendant of two Chickasaw families, both named Love, who were forced to participate in the Trail of Tears. He was a descendant of Benjamin Love, who was the official interpreter for the Chickasaw people.

At age 13, he left home to be educated as a boarder at St. Gregory's High School in Shawnee, where he was a standout football player.

Love attended St. John's University in Collegeville, Minnesota, but left after less than one semester. He then joined the U.S. Marine Corps and over a three-year career, rose to the rank of corporal. After leaving the Marines, he married and decided to try college once more. He dropped out of the University of Oklahoma in 1964.

== Career ==
Initially, Love owned restaurants and car washes, until he discovered an opportunity in abandoned gas stations.

In January 1964, Love and his wife Judy leased a self-service gas station in Watonga, Oklahoma. Love went on to open another 30 gas stations. Then in 1971, he decided to merge self-service gas stations with convenience stores and the business continued to grow.

Today, Love's Travel Stops & Country Stores is a national chain with more than 600 locations in 42 states.

== Personal life and death ==
Tom and Judy Love married on December 26, 1961. They had four children and lived in Oklahoma City. Three of their children work for the company. Frank Love and Greg Love are co-CEOs, and Jenny Love Meyer is the vice president of communications.

Judy Love was secretary of Love's Travel Stops and president of Love's Family Foundation. She sat on the boards of Oklahoma City University, SSM Health Care, the St. Anthony Foundation, Oklahoma City Museum of Art, Civic Center Music Hall, Allied Arts, Community Foundation, and the University of Central Oklahoma Foundation.

Tom Love died in Oklahoma City on March 7, 2023, at age 85. He was posthumously awarded an honorary degree from the University of Oklahoma in May 2024.
