= Sam Dixon (basketball) =

American basketball coach (born 1957)

Current position
- Title: Head coach
- Team: Nebraska Wesleyan (women's basketball)
- Conference: ARC
- Record: 0–0

Biographical details
- Born: July 29, 1957 (age 69)

Playing career

Basketball
- 1975–1979: Wooster (M)

Coaching career (HC unless noted)

Basketball
- 1980–1984: Northern Kentucky (M) (assistant)
- 1984–1985: Kent State (M) (assistant)
- 1985–1987: Davidson (M) (assistant)
- 1987–1991: Denison (M)
- 1991–1995: Northern Illinois (M) (assistant)
- 1996–1997: New Mexico (M) (assistant)
- 1997–1998: Northern Illinois (M) (assistant)
- 1998–1999: Arizona (W) (assistant)
- 1999–2001: Clemson (W) (assistant)
- 2002–2010: Furman (W)
- 2010–2012: Akron (W) (assistant)
- 2012–2017: Northwestern (W) (assistant)
- 2017–2022: Nebraska Wesleyan (W)

Golf
- 1988–1991: Denison (M)

Head coaching record
- Overall: 39–66 (men's basketball); 102–136 (women's basketball)

Sam Dixon (born July 29, 1957) is an American basketball coach. He is the head women's basketball coach at Nebraska Wesleyan University. Dixon served as the head women's basketball coach at Furman University from 2002 to 2010.

Dixon was born in Peoria, Illinois and played for Bishop Watterson High School in Columbus, Ohio, and for the College of Wooster, where he received a Bachelor of Arts degree in physical education in 1979 and was inducted into the Wooster College Hall of Fame in 1989. He also has a master's degree from Eastern Michigan University, and a Ph.D. from University of New Mexico in 1997, both in physical education.

Dixon coached women's basketball as an assistant at Clemson University from 1999 to 2001, and before that at the University of Arizona in 1998–99. He served as an assistant men's basketball coach at Northern Illinois University, Davidson College, Kent State University, and Northern Kentucky University, as well as Harrison High School in Kennesaw, Georgia.

== Head coaching record ==
=== Women's basketball ===
Record table
Season	Team	Overall	Conference	Standing	Postseason
Furman Paladins (Southern Conference) (2002–2010)
2002–03	Furman	16–13	11–7	4th	
2003–04	Furman	18–11	14–6	2nd	
2004–05	Furman	18–10	12–7	3rd	
2005–06	Furman	10–24	6–14	9th	
2006–07	Furman	11–20	6–13	8th	
2007–08	Furman	10–20	5–13	7th	
2008–09	Furman	12–18	6–14	9th	
2009–10	Furman	7–24	4–16	11th	
Nebraska Wesleyan Prairie Wolves (American Rivers Conference) (2017–2022)
2017–2018	Nebraska Wesleyan University	14–11	5–11	7th	
2018–2019	Nebraska Wesleyan University	12–14	7–9	6th	
Furman:		102–136	64–90		
Nebraska Wesleyan:		38-70	18-54		
Total:		140–206			
