= Marilyn Artus =

American visual artist

- Visual artist Marilyn Artus
- Born: Marilyn McBrier
- Education: University of Oklahoma; University of the Incarnate Word
- Known for: Visual arts, fiber arts, digital collage
- Website: marilynartus.com

Marilyn Artus (Marilyn McBrier Artus) is a visual artist whose work explores the female experience.

Artus created "Her Flag", a nationwide collaborative art project to celebrate the 100th anniversary of the U.S. 19th Amendment. "Her Flag" was completed on August 18, 2020 in Nashville, TN. "Her Flag" premiered at the Clinton Presidential Library in Little Rock, Arkansas in 2020. It was then exhibited at the National Museum of Women in the Arts in Washington D.C. in 2021.

== Career ==
Artus was one of the founders of The Girlie Show, a 2-day, annual all-female art and craft show in Oklahoma City that was founded in 2003.

The Girlie Show founders, Erin Merryweather, Dawn Tyler Harth, and Marilyn Artus received the "Great Inspirations" award in 2008 from Creative Oklahoma, Inc.

Artus is the founder of the Oklahoma City branch of Dr. Sketchy's Anti-Art School.

Artus was Volunteer of the year in 2014 for Planned Parenthood of Central Oklahoma. She also serves on the board of directors for PPCO (Planned Parenthood of Central Oklahoma).

From 2009 to 2012, Artus served as board vice president for Individual Artists of Oklahoma, a non-profit organization that promotes and provides opportunities for Oklahoma artists.

She was the first recipient to receive the Brady Craft Alliance Award for Innovation in Fiber Arts in 2011.

In 2010, she led an art making workshop at The Brooklyn Museum in New York in conjunction with the retrospective exhibit Seductive Subversion: Women Pop Artists, 1958-1968.
