= Jada Benn Torres =

American genetic anthropologist

- Born: Jada Benn
- Education: University of New Mexico; University of Notre Dame
- Scientific career
- Workplaces: Vanderbilt University; Arizona State University; Ohio State University
- Thesis: African Ancestry and Admixture Estimates throughout the Anglophone Caribbean (2006)

Jada Benn Torres is an American genetic anthropologist and associate professor of anthropology at Vanderbilt University. She serves as Director of the Laboratory of Genetic Anthropology and Biocultural Studies. Her research considers the genetic ancestry of African and Indigenous people

== Early life and education ==
Benn Torres' parents are from Trinidad. She has said that the childhood stories her father told her about her ancestors inspired her career in anthropology. Benn Torres earned her undergraduate degree in anthropology at the University of Notre Dame. She moved to the University of New Mexico for her graduate studies, where she investigated African ancestry throughout the Anglophone Caribbean region. After earning her doctorate, Benn Torres moved to University of Chicago.

== Research and career ==
In 2008 Benn Torres joined the University of Notre Dame, where she was the first molecular anthropologist member of faculty. Molecular anthropology At Notre Dame Benn Torres used genetics to study the distribution of disease across different populations. She studied why African-Americans were more likely to develop uterine fibroids at a younger age than women from other populations. She moved to the Anthropology Department at Vanderbilt University in 2016. Benn Torres combines genetic epidemiology and anthropology to better understand health disparities.

== Awards and honours ==
- 2015 Gabriel Ward Lasker Award
- 2017 Vanderbilt University Provost Research Studios
- 2021 Robert W. Sussman Award
- 2023 Fellow of the American Association for the Advancement of Science

== Selected publications ==
BENN TORRES, JADA. A. TORRES COLON, GABRIEL. (2020). GENETIC ANCESTRY : our stories, our pasts. [S.l.]: ROUTLEDGE. ISBN 978-0-367-02624-0. OCLC 1154096294.

- Robbins, Christiane; Torres, Jada Benn; Hooker, Stanley; Bonilla, Carolina; Hernandez, Wenndy; Candreva, Angela; Ahaghotu, Chiledum; Kittles, Rick; Carpten, John (2007-12-01). "Confirmation study of prostate cancer risk variants at 8q24 in African Americans identifies a novel risk locus". Genome Research. 17 (12): 1717–1722. doi:10.1101/gr.6782707. ISSN 1088-9051. PMC 2099580. PMID 17978284.
- Benn-Torres, J.; Bonilla, C.; Robbins, C. M.; Waterman, L.; Moses, T. Y.; Hernandez, W.; Santos, E. R.; Bennett, F.; Aiken, W.; Tullock, T.; Coard, K. (2008). "Admixture and Population Stratification in African Caribbean Populations". Annals of Human Genetics. 72 (1): 90–98. doi:10.1111/j.1469-1809.2007.00398.x. ISSN 1469-1809. PMID 17908263. S2CID 28510744.
