= Christina Warinner =

Archaeological geneticist

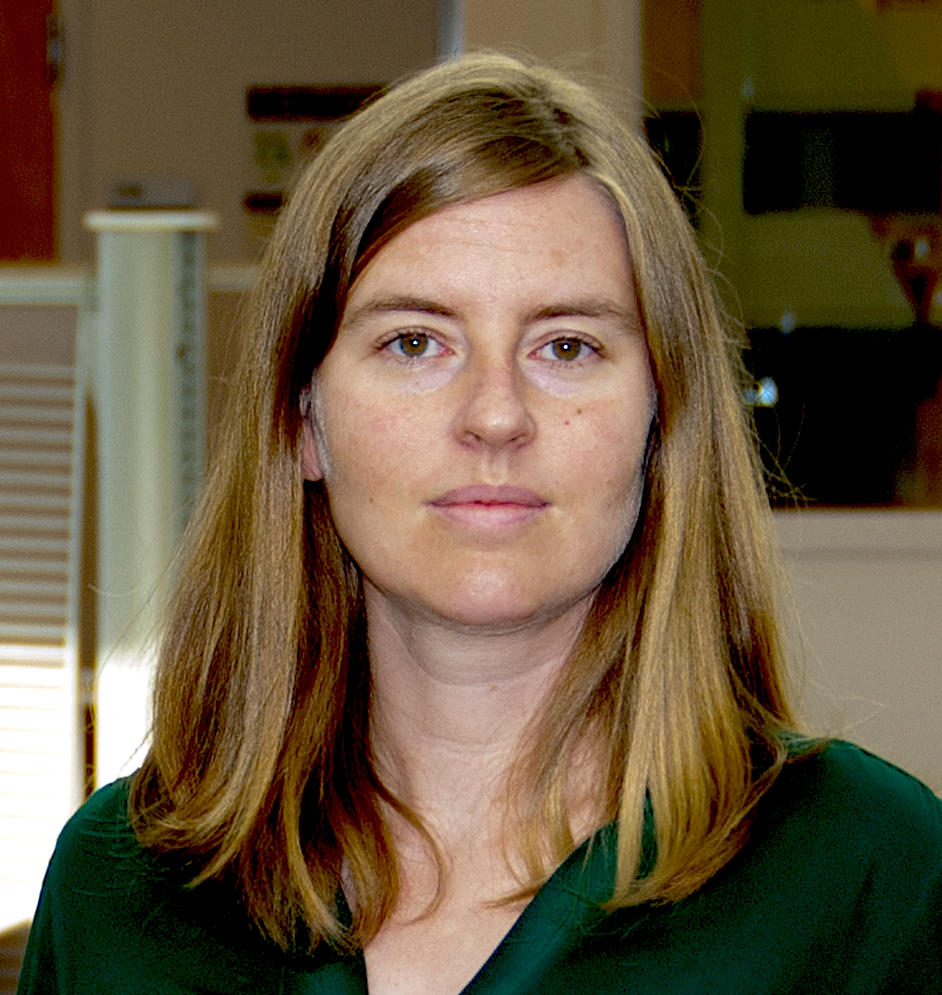
- Education: Harvard University; University of Kansas
- Known for: TEDx talk Debunking the Paleo Diet
- Awards: US National Academy of Sciences Kavli Fellowship (2014), TED Fellowship 2012
- Scientific career
- Fields: Archaeogenetics; Molecular anthropology
- Workplaces: Harvard University; Max Planck Institute for the Science of Human History
- Website: christinawarinner.com

Christina Warinner is an American anthropologist best known for her research on the evolution of ancient microbiomes. She is an assistant professor of Anthropology at Harvard University and the Sally Starling Seaver Assistant Professor at the Radcliffe Institute. Warinner is also a Research group leader at the Max Planck Institute for the Science of Human History in Jena, Germany.

== Biography ==
Christina Warinner obtained a PhD from Harvard University in 2010. From 2010 – 2012, Warinner completed postdoctoral training at the University of Zurich's Centre for Evolutionary Medicine. Warinner's research explored the relationship between disease, diet and the environment by analyzing DNA extracted from ancient dental plaque.

Warinner furthered her postdoctoral studies at the University of Oklahoma from 2012 to 2014, and she continued there as an assistant professor of Anthropology and a Presidential Research Professor from 2014 to 2019. "A top priority in Warinner's laboratory is to compile DNA and protein inventories from dental calculus (calcified dental plaque) found in skeletal collections from museums and archaeological sites from around the world with the goal of discovering how human health and diet have changed throughout history."

Since 2016, Warinner has led a research team in the archaeogenetics department at Max Planck Institute for the Science of Human History in Jena, Germany. Warinner's research focuses on ancestral human microbiomes. Recent projects include "Dairying and Dietary Adaptive Evolution in Prehistory", "Evolution and Ecology of the Human Gut Microbiome" and "Evolution and Ecology of the Human Oral Microbiome". Research she led found the exotic mineral Lapis Lazuli in the plaque of a female skeleton found in a cemetery in Dalheim in Germany. A 2017 report detailed that the plaque dating from 1100 AD contained fragments of this bright blue paint pigment indicates that women as well as men were involved in creating illuminated manuscripts. It is presumed that the woman used her lips to shape her brush as she worked painting bright blue.

Warinner was named a TED fellow in 2012 and a US National Academy of Sciences Kavli Fellow in 2014. She gave a TED talk in February 2012 on the evolution of infectious disease and diet in humans. In January 2013 Warinner gave a TEDx talk titled "Debunking the Paleo Diet".

Warinner joined the anthropology department at Harvard University in 2019 and the Sally Starling Seaver Assistant Professor at the Radcliffe Institute. Warinner is also a Research group leader at the Max Planck Institute for the Science of Human History in Jena, Germany.

== Selected publications ==
- Warinner, Christina; et al. (2017). "A Robust Framework for Microbial Archaeology". Annual Review of Genomics and Human Genetics. 18: 321–356. doi:10.1146/annurev-genom-091416-035526. PMC 5581243. PMID 28460196.
- Warinner, Christina (2016). "Dental Calculus and the Evolution of the Human Oral Microbiome". Journal of the California Dental Association. 44 (7): 411–420. doi:10.1080/19424396.2016.12221034. hdl:11858/00-001M-0000-002B-5472-7. PMID 27514153. S2CID 35175328.
- Warinner, Christina; et al. (2015). "Ancient Human Microbiomes". Journal of Human Evolution. 79: 125–136. doi:10.1016/j.jhevol.2014.10.016. PMC 4312737. PMID 25559298.
- Warinner, Christina; Tuross, Noreen (2010). "Tissue isotopic enrichment associated with growth depression in a pig: implications for archaeology and ecology". American Journal of Physical Anthropology. 141 (3): 486–493. doi:10.1002/ajpa.21222. PMID 20052664.
- Warinner, Christina; et al. (2009). Veiled Brightness: A History of Ancient Maya Color (The William and Bettye Nowlin Series in Art, History, and Culture of the Western Hemisphere). University of Texas Press. p. 162. ISBN 978-0292719002.

== Awards ==
- 2014 – Honorable Mention for the International Society for Evolution, Medicine & Public Health's Omenn Prize
- 2014 – US National Academy of Sciences Kavli Fellowship
- 2012 – TED Fellowship
- 2026 – Elected to the National Academy of Sciences
