= Maye Torres =

American artist

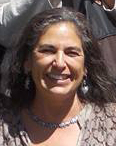
- Torres in 2014 during a US State Department-sponsored cultural exchange in Ethiopia
- Born: 1960 (age 65–66); Taos, New Mexico
- Education: University of New Mexico
- Known for: Sculpture; drawing
- Website: mayetorresart.com

Maye Torres (born 1960) is an American artist who specializes in large-scale drawings and sculptures. Raised in New Mexico and Latin America, her work is influenced by the arts, cultures and spiritual beliefs of those areas.

== Early life and education ==
Torres was born in Taos, New Mexico, and is a 13th-generation Taos native. Her father was a rural science educator, and her mother owned the Taos New Direction Gallery. As a family, they moved to various places including El Salvador, Ecuador, and Bolivia, eventually returning to Taos. She said that growing up, "There were a lot of artists around and they were really respected, not treated like bohemians who didn’t want to get a job."

While still in high school, Torres assisted sculptor Ted Egri and had some of her first art showings at Stables Gallery. She later received a Bachelor of Fine Arts degree from the University of New Mexico with a focus on studio art and science. During her junior year of college, she attended Humbolt State University in Northern California as a National Honors Exchange Student. After her schooling, she apprenticed with painter John Wegner and light-and-space artist Larry Bell in order to learn about cutting-edge media.

== Work ==
Torres has created several public art commissions including a piece for the Workforce Training Center in Albuquerque, which houses her largest public bronze installation to date. Another large-scale bronze sculpture, Untitled Coalminer #1, is one of nine pieces she created for the Miners’ Colfax Medical Center in Raton, New Mexico, and commemorates the hardworking miners who brought electricity to the area.

Torres's work has been exhibited across the Southwest, including the Harwood Museum of Art in Taos, the National Hispanic Cultural Center in Albuquerque and the State Capitol in Santa Fe, New Mexico; Longview Museum of Art in Longview, Texas; and in Venice Beach, Palo Alto, San Diego and Downtown Los Angeles, California, as well as Denver, Colorado. Her art is in the private collections around the world, including Moctesuma Esparza, Luis Valdez and Guillermo Gomez-Pena. Her art is also included in collections of the Los Angeles County Museum of Arts and the Laguna Art Museum in California and the Mexican Fine Arts Center in Chicago. In 2014, she was selected for the United States Department of State's Art in Embassies program, for which she traveled to Addis Ababa, Ethiopia, for a cultural exchange and her drawing Samba Pa Ti was exhibited at the residence of U.S. Ambassador Patricia M. Haslach.

== Recognition ==
Torres is the creator of the Taos Talking Picture Festival's Cineaste Award and has been featured in many American art publications. She was included in 100 Artists of the Southwest, compiled and edited by Douglas Bullis. In 2018, she was awarded the Taos Fall Arts Visionary Artist Award from the Peter and Madeleine Martin Foundation for the Creative Arts.

She is one of five artists featured in the 2008 documentary, Who Does She Think She Is, directed by Pamela Tanner Boll.

== Personal life ==
Torres met her late husband, master painter Rory Wagner, at the age of 16.

Torres has three sons with her first husband. She describes her children as a driving force behind her artwork: "My sons are my true masterpieces, they taught me the real, true meaning of creativity."
