= Love's =

Travel stop and gas station and convenience store company in the United States

Love's Travel Stops

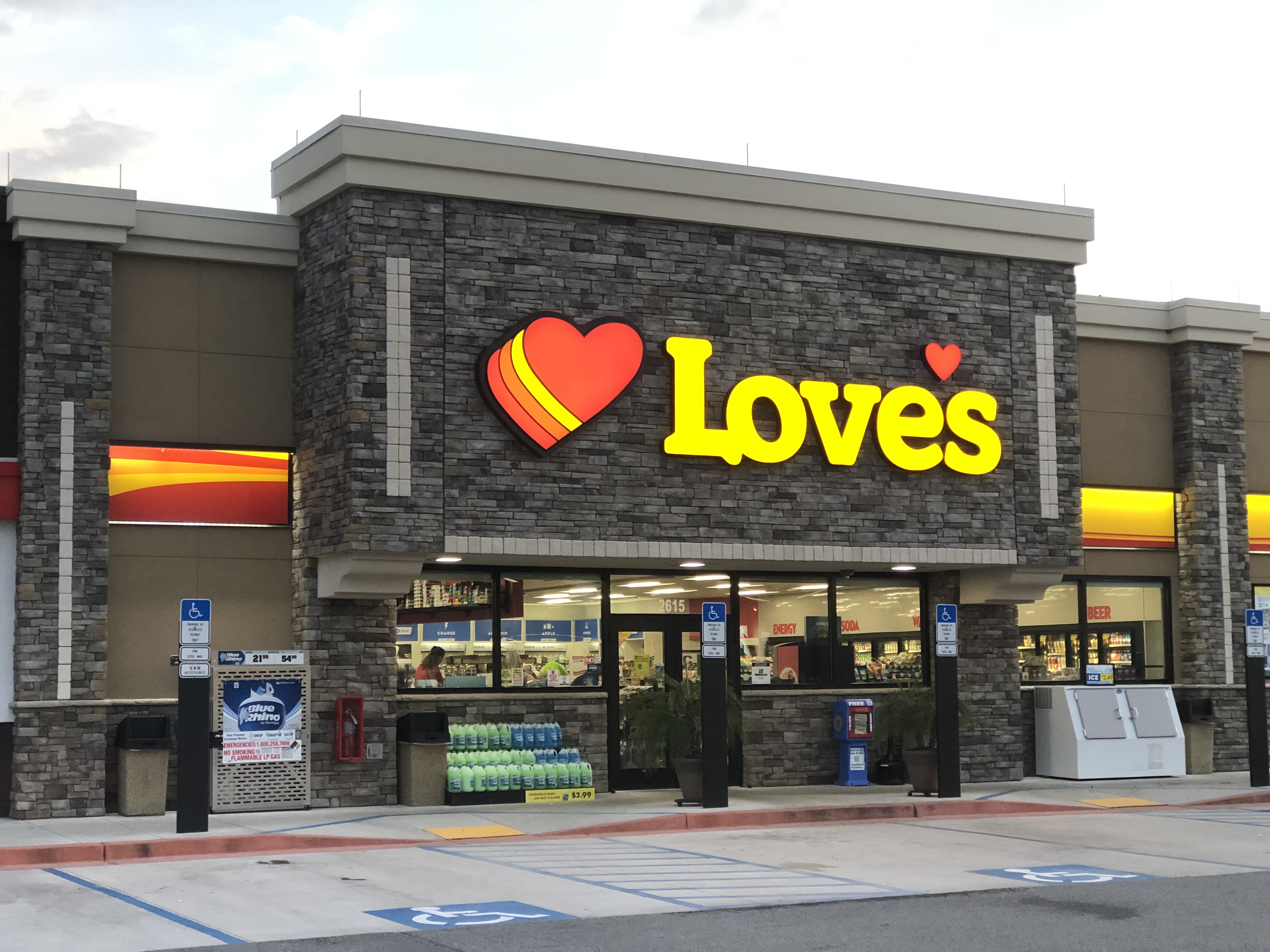
- Love's Travel Stops & Country Stores in Bushnell, Florida.
- Type: Private
- Industry: Energy, Retail (Convenience stores), Hospitality, Storage
- Founded: 1964; 62 years ago
- Founder: Tom Love and Judy Love
- Headquarters: Oklahoma City, Oklahoma, United States
- Number of locations: 630
- Area served: United States
- Key people: Greg Love (CEO); Frank Love (co-CEO); Jenny Love Meyer (Chief Culture Officer and EVP); Shane Wharton (president)
- Services: Diesel fuel Fuel; Truck maintenance Restaurants; Convenience stores Driver amenities Hospitality; Storage
- Revenue: ▲US$24 billion (2024)
- Owner: Love family
- Number of employees: 40,000 (2023)
- Website: www.loves.com

Love's Travel Stops, doing business as Love's (or stylized as Loves), is an American family owned-and-operated chain of more than 670 travel stops in 42 states in the United States. The company is privately owned and headquartered in Oklahoma City. Love's ranked No. 15 on the 2025 Forbes list of America's largest private companies. Love's has two primary kinds of stores: country stores and travel stops. Country stores are fueling stations with a convenience store attached. The larger travel stops are located along highways and offer additional amenities such as food from restaurant chains such as Arby's, Bojangles, Burger King, Chester's, Dunkin' Donuts, McDonald's, Taco John's, Subway, Wendy's, Hardee's/Carl's Jr., truck parking spaces, showers and laundry. The company started adding RV hookups and RV Stops in 2022. Love's had more than 40,000 employees in 2023.

== History ==
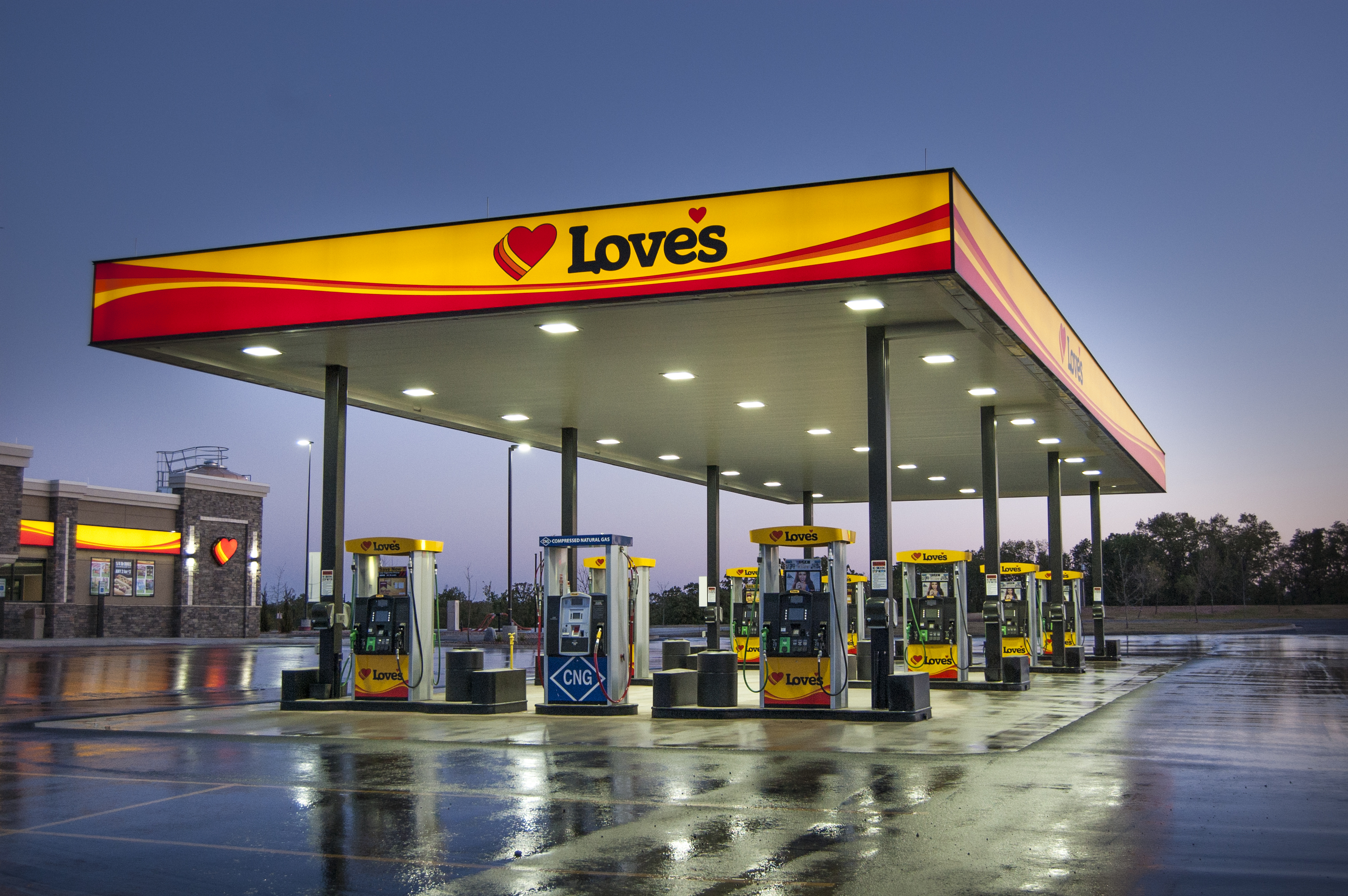
Love's Travel Stops fuel island off Interstate 40 in Choctaw, Oklahoma

In 1964, Tom and Judy Love spent $5,000 (equivalent to $51,900 in 2025), which was borrowed from Judy's parents, to lease an abandoned service station in Watonga, Oklahoma, an hour northwest of Oklahoma City. They named their company Musket Corporation. Over the next eight years, Musket opened 40 additional gas stations. All of them operated under the Kerr-McGee fuel brand. Some of the innovations that the company introduced included extended service hours and the sale of non-fuel merchandise. When the fuel crunch of the early 1970s began and gasoline was in short supply in the United States, Tom Love diversified for the sake of the company's success. He launched a new concept in Watonga: the "Mini Stop Country Store". The Mini Stop was successful and the company quickly opened more stores in western Oklahoma.

In 1972, Musket set out to convert all of its locations from fuel stations to convenience stores with self-serve fuel. By 1973, the company began using the family name to identify its locations. Love's Country Stores was the new name.

By 1978, Love's Country Stores had 60 locations in small communities throughout Oklahoma, Kansas, Colorado, New Mexico, and Texas. That year, the company began offering the Fresh Daily Deli, sandwiches made fresh daily in the location. Food service became the company's third profit center in each location, along with self-serve gasoline and convenience store items. The Fresh Daily Deli is branded today as Love's Subs.

By the end of 1981, the company reached a milestone with 100 Love's Country Stores locations in operation. The in-store decor was changed from the previous dark country look to a brighter theme. The same year, it opened the first Love's Travel Stop on Interstate 40 in Amarillo, Texas. The addition of self-serve diesel fuel brought professional drivers to Love's. The Travel Stop served both the professional driver and the motoring public, resulting in more growth for Love's with the new target audience.

In 1985, Love's added gifts and novelties. Then in 1993, Taco Bell became a partner, opening a cobranded location in Oklahoma City. The success of this partnership quickly grew.

In the late 1990s, food service continued to grow. Soon the company was partnering with an array of cobranded restaurant concepts, including Arby's, Baskin-Robbins, Bojangles, Burger King, Carl's Jr., Chester's, Dairy Queen, Del Taco, Denny's, Dunkin' Donuts, Godfather's Pizza, Green Burrito, Hardee's, IHOP, McDonald's, Sonic Drive-In, Subway, Taco Bell, Taco John's and Wendy's.

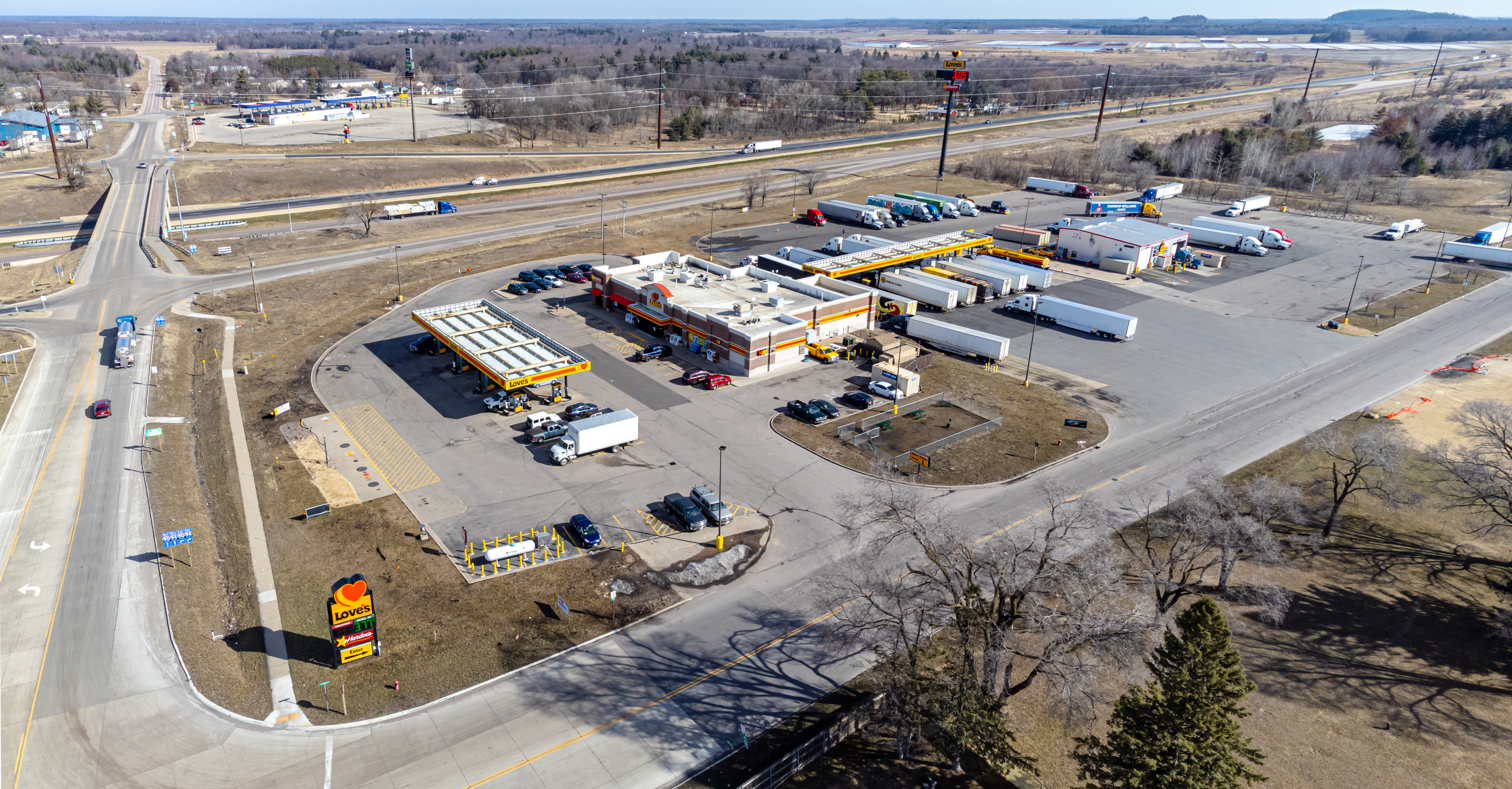
Love's Travel Stops off I-90/I-94 in Oakdale, Wisconsin

In 2000, Sales & Marketing Executives International awarded Love's the 2000 Outlook Award, for innovation and outstanding contribution to the future of the convenience store industry.

The first truck tire care location opened in 2008, branded as Speedco, offering tires, equipment, light mechanical work, oil changes and roadside service.

On June 30, 2010, Love's Travel Stops acquired 20 Pilot Travel Centers locations and six Flying J locations as part of a divestiture required by the Federal Trade Commission to address antitrust concerns related to the merger between Pilot and Flying J. Love's Travel Stops & Country Stores entered into a partnership agreement with the National Basketball Association (NBA)'s Oklahoma City Thunder on March 15, 2019. The agreement allows Love's to prominently place its logo on the front left shoulder of all Oklahoma City Thunder jerseys.

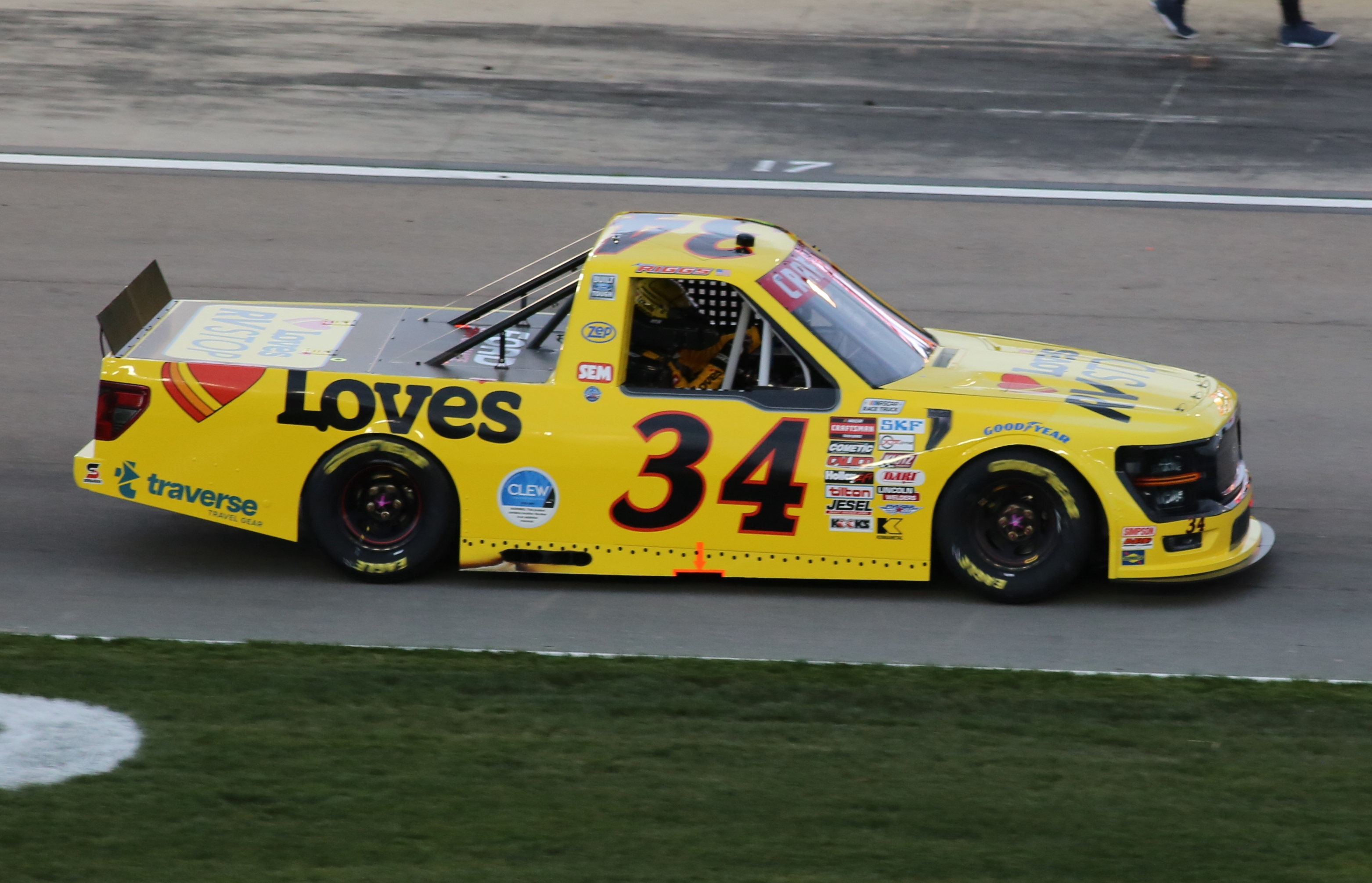
Layne Riggs' No. 34 truck at Las Vegas Motor Speedway.

They also have had a long-standing sponsorship deal with the NASCAR Cup Series team Front Row Motorsports, and were on Michael McDowell's car when he finished in 1st place in the 2021 Daytona 500. Front Row Motorsports opened a NASCAR Truck Series team in 2020, and Love's is a primary sponsor. Love's was on the Zane Smith's truck when he won the NextEra Energy 250, in which he won back-to-back years. Love's was on Layne Riggs's truck when he won the UNOH 200 and for two additional wins since. Since 2025, Todd Gilliland has driven the No. 34 Ford Mustang Dark Horse.

In February 2023, Love's announced that it had purchased Lawton, Oklahoma-based EZ GO Stores, a chain of 22 convenience stores operating in three states (15 stores as well as a CNG fueling station in Oklahoma, five stores in Kansas and two stores in Nebraska).

Company founder and executive chairman Tom Love died at home in Oklahoma City, Oklahoma, on March 7, 2023, at age 85. His wife, Judy, died on November 5, 2024, at the age of 87.

In April 2025, Love's rebranded Trillium Energy Solutions as Love's Alternative Energy. Love's had previously acquired the company in 2016.

== Key dates ==
- 1964 – Tom and Judy Love launch the Musket chain with a gas station in Watonga, Oklahoma.
- 1972 – The first Country Store opens in Guymon, Oklahoma.
- 1978 – Love's Country Stores, Inc. is established.
- 1981 – The first Travel Stop opens in Amarillo, Texas.
- 1986 – The company is renamed Love's Travel Stops & Country Stores, Inc.
- 1990 – Love's adds major branded fast-food franchises to travel stops.
- 1999 – Love's opens its 50th travel stop.
- 2000 – Gemini Motor Transport becomes the primary carrier for Love's.
- 2013 – Love's opens 300th location.
- 2015 – Love's opens 300th travel stop.
- 2016 – Love's purchases Trillium CNG. Love's opens 400th location.
- 2017 – Love's purchases Speedco.
- 2019 – Love's opens 500th location.
- 2022 – Love's starts adding RV hookups and RV Stops.
- 2023 – Love's purchases EZ GO Stores.
- 2024 – Love's celebrates 60 years.
