= List of people from Oklahoma City =

The following is a list of notable people who were born, raised or lived in Oklahoma City. This list should not include professional and college athletes who played in Oklahoma City unless they are originally from there.

Notable people from the state of Oklahoma, but not Oklahoma City or its suburbs, should go in the page titled "List of people from Oklahoma."

== People by field ==
=== Athletics ===
==== Basketball ====
- Alvan Adams, former NBA player for the Phoenix Suns
- Clay Bennett, owner of the NBA Oklahoma City Thunder franchise
- Antoine Carr, retired basketball player
- Blake Griffin, NBA player for the Boston Celtics
- Xavier Henry, former NBA Guard
- Betty Lennox, former WNBA Guard
- Daniel Orton, former NBA Center
- Josh Richardson, current NBA Guard

==== Baseball ====
- Johnny Bench, Cincinnati Reds catcher, Baseball Hall of Fame
- Mike Brumley, former MLB player
- Joe Carter, MLB outfielder, five-time All-Star
- Don Demeter, former MLB outfielder
- Michael Fulmer, MLB pitcher, Detroit Tigers
- Andrew Heaney, MLB baseball player, Los Angeles Angels
- Bobby Murcer, New York Yankees outfielder, five-time All-Star
- Allie Reynolds, former MLB player, six-time World Series Champion as pitcher with the New York Yankees
- Bullet Rogan, former baseball player in the Negro leagues
- Jeff Suppan, former MLB baseball player
- Mickey Tettleton, former MLB baseball player
- Jamey Wright, former MLB baseball player

==== Hockey ====
- Tyler Arnason, hockey player, Colorado Avalanche
- Matt Donovan, hockey player, drafted in 2008 NHL draft by the New York Islanders
- Jon Merrill, hockey player, drafted in 2010 NHL draft by New Jersey Devils; selected in the 2017 expansion draft by the Vegas Golden Knights
- Dan Woodley, retired hockey player, drafted 7th overall in the 1986 NHL entry draft by the Vancouver Canucks

==== Football ====
- Dan Bailey, NFL kicker, retired
- Cameron Batson, NFL wide receiver and return specialist for the Atlanta Falcons
- Sam Bradford, NFL player, Heisman Trophy winner
- Mark J. Clayton, Baltimore Ravens wide receiver
- Jimmy Edwards, Canadian Football League player
- Karl Farmer, NFL wide receiver
- Deji Karim, NFL football player with Jacksonville Jaguars and Indianapolis Colts
- Roger Kramer, Canadian Football League player
- Steve Largent, NFL wide receiver
- Alva Liles, NFL player
- Gerald McCoy, NFL player
- Lee Morris, Green Bay Packers wide receiver
- Steve Owens, 1969 Heisman Trophy winner
- Tinker Owens, former NFL football player
- Barry Switzer, national championship and Super Bowl-winning football coach
- Brandon Weeden, NFL football player with the Cleveland Browns and Dallas Cowboys
- Wes Welker, Denver Broncos wide receiver
- Jason White, 2003 Heisman Trophy winner

==== Golf ====
- Bob Tway, 1986 PGA champion
- Kevin Tway, professional golfer

==== Boxing ====
- Sean O'Grady, World Boxing Association Lightweight Champion

==== Other sports ====
- Jeff Bennett, track and field coach at Oklahoma Christian University; placed 4th in 1972 Olympics decathlon
- Louise Brough, Hall of Fame tennis player, winner of six Grand Slam championships
- Bryan Byars, soccer player and coach
- Justin Chavez, soccer player
- Shane Hamman, Olympic weightlifter, 2000, 2004
- Norman Hitchcock, pool and billiards player
- Mat Hoffman, world record holder BMX rider
- Hayden W. Lingo, Hall of Fame player of the billiards game "One Pocket"
- Jon-Paul Pittman, professional football player for Wycombe Wanderers
- Jim Ross, professional wrestling commentator
- Bill Watts, professional wrestler and promoter
- Wayne Wells, Olympic gold medalist and World Champion in freestyle wrestling, first ever Nike signature athlete

=== Business people ===
- Clay Bennett, Oklahoma City Thunder owner
- Edward L. Gaylord, owner of Grand Ole Opry and The Oklahoman
- Alan C. Greenberg, Wall Street financier
- Harold Hamm, oil billionaire
- Aubrey McClendon, former CEO of Chesapeake Energy
- J. Larry Nichols, CEO of Devon Energy
- Chad Richison, founder, CEO and chairmanchairman of Paycom
- Tom L. Ward, chairman and CEO at SandRidge Energy; co-founder of Chesapeake Energy

=== Humanities ===
==== Dance ====
- Yvonne Chouteau, Shawnee Tribe ballerina

==== Directors and filmmakers ====
- Gray Frederickson, Academy Award-winning producer
- Ron Howard, actor and director
- Ray William Johnson, vlogger known for the popular Equals Three videos
- Carol Littleton, film editor

==== Actors and musicians ====
- Lexi Ainsworth, actress
- Louise Allbritton, actress
- Suzy Amis, actress and model, most notably in film Titanic
- Molly Bee, singer
- Henson Cargill, country singer
- Lon Chaney Jr., film actor
- Don Cherry, jazz cornetist
- Charlie Christian, musician, "father of the electric guitar"
- Graham Colton, pop music artist
- Mason Cook, actor
- Wayne Coyne, lead singer of the band The Flaming Lips
- Louise Currie, actress
- Robert deMaine, international classical cello virtuoso, composer, and teacher
- Steven Drozd, musician in The Flaming Lips
- Ronnie Claire Edwards, actress, most notable as Corabeth Godsey in The Waltons
- The Flaming Lips, alternative rock band
- Gennifer Flowers, actress
- Matthew Followill, lead guitarist for the band Kings of Leon
- Kay Francis, film actress
- Lizzie Freeman, actress
- James Garner, actor
- Vince Gill, country singer
- Robert Glasgow, organist and professor
- Chasen Hampton, actor and singer
- Hinder, alternative rock band
- Mark Holton, actor
- Mark Houston, composer and actor
- C.B. Hudson, rock guitarist
- Wanda Jackson, member of the Rock and Roll Hall of Fame
- Kenneth Kilgore, musician
- Lauren Lane, actress, most notable as C.C. Babcock in The Nanny
- Rex Linn, actor
- Stacey (Loach) Logan, theater singer and actor
- Terry Manning, music producer, photographer
- Tisha Campbell Martin, television actress
- Barry McGuire, singer-songwriter
- Ryan Merriman, actor
- Mothica, American singer
- Megan Mullally, actress (moved to OKC at age 6)
- Olivia Munn, model, actress and television personality
- Bonnie Owens, country singer
- Brina Palencia, voice and television actress
- Gayla Peevey, child singer ("I Want a Hippopotamus for Christmas")
- Dale Robertson, television actor
- Neal Schon, guitarist of Journey
- Carolyn Smith-Meyer, operatic soprano
- Smooth McGroove, musician known for a cappella covers of video game music
- Stardeath and White Dwarfs, alternative rock band
- John Michael Talbot, monk and guitarist
- Pamela Tiffin, actress
- Katharine Mulky Warne, composer
- Sam Watters, recording artist, member of Color Me Badd
- Mason Williams, recording artist, "Classical Gas"
- Austin Winkler, singer, musician, former member of Hinder
- Jeff Wood, country singer
- Gretchen Wyler, actress

==== Writers ====
- Ralph Ellison, novelist
- Kimberly N. Foster, writer and cultural critic
- Louis L'Amour, western author
- Jason Nelson, pioneering digital poet and writer
- Jim Thompson, noir novelist and screenwriter

==== Visual artists ====
- Sharron Ahtone Harjo (born 1945), Kiowa painter, ledger artist, and educator
- Tahnee Ahtone, Kiowa/Muscogee/Seminole
- Petah Coyne, sculptor
- Benjamin Harjo Jr. (born 1945), Seminole-Absentee Shawnee, painter
- Edgar Heap of Birds (born 1954), Cheyenne-Arapaho Tribes installation artist, painter, conceptual artist
- Huda Kattan, CEO of Huda Beauty, makeup artist
- G. Patrick Riley, mask maker and art educator
- Edward Ruscha, painter
- Richard Ray Whitman (born 1949), Yuchi-Muscogee Creek Nation photographer, painter, installation artist

=== News, commentary ===
- Skip Bayless, author, sports journalist and TV personality, ESPN First Take
- Gary England, former chief meteorologist of KWTV-DT 1972–2013
- Dan Fagin, Pulitzer Prize-winning author and journalist
- Renee Ferguson, journalist (WMAQ-TV)
- James J. Kilpatrick, journalist most famous for his regular segment on 60 Minutes
- Mike Morgan, chief meteorologist of KFOR-TV since 1993
- Anthony Shadid, Pulitzer Prize-winning correspondent for The New York Times
- Jennifer Welch, author and host of the I've Had It podcast
- Angie "Pumps" Sullivan co-host of the I've had it podcast

=== Political figures ===
- Stephanie Bice, U.S. representative for Oklahoma
- David Boren, former governor and U.S. senator
- Michael D. Brown, FEMA head during Hurricane Katrina
- David Dank, member of the Oklahoma House of Representatives 2007–2015
- Odilia Dank, former member of the Oklahoma House of Representatives, 1995–2006
- Mickey Edwards, former congressman
- Bryce Harlow, lobbyist and Eisenhower advisor
- David Holt, mayor
- Ernest Istook, former congressman
- Frank Keating, former governor
- Robert S. Kerr, former governor and U.S. senator
- Jeane Kirkpatrick, ambassador to the United Nations
- James Lankford, U.S. senator and former U.S congressman
- George Nigh, former governor
- Russell M. Perry, former Oklahoma Secretary of Commerce
- John Threadgill (1847–1915), Oklahoma legislator and Texas politician
- Elizabeth Warren, U.S. senator and 2020 presidential candidate
- J.C. Watts, University of Oklahoma football player and former congressman
- Mac Q. Williamson, former attorney general of Oklahoma

=== Other ===
- Rick Bayless, celebrity chef
- Jay Bernstein, Hollywood producer and manager
- Jennifer Berry, Miss America 2006
- Sweet Brown, YouTube sensation of "Ain't Nobody Got Time For That"
- Gordon Cooper, astronaut
- Mick Cornett, former Mayor of Oklahoma City; former television personality
- Mary Fallin, governor of Oklahoma since 2010; former congresswoman
- Ray William Johnson, YouTuber, star of Equals 3 and lead singer of Your Favorite Martian
- Howard Lapham, architect known for mid-century modern design
- Darci Lynne, ventriloquist, winner of America's Got Talent, Season 12
- Owen Garriott, astronaut
- Robert Harlan Henry, president of Oklahoma City University, former federal judge on the U.S. Court of Appeals for the Tenth Circuit
- John Herrington, astronaut
- Jerome Holmes, federal judge on U.S. Court of Appeals for the Tenth Circuit
- Jane Anne Jayroe, Miss America 1967
- Sante Kimes, conwoman and serial killer
- Shannon Lucid, astronaut
- Clara Luper, civil rights activist
- Chelsea Manning, transgender U.S. Army former intelligence analyst convicted by court-martial for crimes related to the 2010 WikiLeaks scandal
- William A. Martin, computer scientist, artificial intelligence pioneer
- Donna Nelson, University of Oklahoma chemistry professor, 2016 ACS president, and science advisor to Breaking Bad
- Lauren Nelson, Miss America 2007
- Eugene Nida, linguist and translator
- William Reid Pogue, astronaut
- Wiley Post, aviator
- Susan Powell, Miss America 1981, opera singer
- Kevin Samuels, YouTuber
- Norma Smallwood, Miss America 1926
- Shawntel Smith, Miss America 1996
- Thomas P. Stafford, astronaut
- Sallie Lewis Stephens Sturgeon, journalist, public health inspector, and social worker

=== Non-native Oklahoma City residents ===
- Eusebius J. Beltran, archbishop emeritus, Roman Catholic Archdiocese of Oklahoma City, former bishop of Tulsa
- Brian Bosworth, linebacker for the University of Oklahoma (1984–1986) and the Seattle Seahawks of the National Football League (1987–1989)
- Paul and Thomas Braniff, Braniff Airlines co-founders
- Jacob Aldolphus Bryce (Delf A. 'Jelly' Bryce), Oklahoma City detective and FBI agent, exceptional marksman and fast draw, noted for his dress sense
- Cattle Annie, or Anna Emmaline McDoulet Roach, female bandit, lived in Oklahoma City from 1912 until her death in 1978
- Greyson Chance, singer
- Kristin Chenoweth, actress and singer
- Mark J. Clayton, Baltimore Ravens wide receiver
- Paul Stagg Coakley, incumbent, Roman Catholic archbishop of archdiocese of Oklahoma City, former bishop of Salina, Kansas
- Walter Cronkite, CBS Evening News anchor
- Glen Day, professional golfer
- Amy Grant, Contemporary Christian artist
- Todd Hamilton, professional golfer, British Open Champion
- Ed Harris, actor
- Chris Harrison, host of ABC's The Bachelor
- Mary Hart, TV personality
- Anthony Kim, professional golfer
- Marian P. Opala, justice of the Oklahoma Supreme Court and member of the Polish Underground in World War II
- Blessed Rev. Fr. Stanley Rother, from suburban Okarche, Oklahoma, first native-born U.S. citizen to be a martyr, and to be beatified in the U.S.
- Billy Sims, football player, 1978 Heisman Trophy winner
- Jerry Spann, United States Chess Federation president (1957–1960); FIDE vice-president
- Scott Verplank, professional golfer
- Hobart Johnstone Whitley, banker, treasurer for Chicago Rock Island & Texas Railroad 1892–1894
- Bud Wilkinson, OU football coach, broadcaster, College Football Hall of Fame
- "Dr. Death" Steve Williams, WWE champion wrestler; two-time All-American football player; four-time All-American wrestler at OU
- Willie Wood, professional golfer

=== U.S. service members ===
- Admiral William J. Crowe (USN), chairman of the Joint Chiefs of Staff
