= Clay Bennett (businessman) =

American businessman

- Born: Clayton Ike Bennett; November 14, 1959 (age 66); Oklahoma City, Oklahoma, U.S.
- Occupations: Chairman, Dorchester Capital; Chairman, Professional Basketball Club LLC
- Spouse: Louise Gaylord Ennis (m. 1981)
- Basketball career

Oklahoma City Thunder
- Position: Principal owner (2008–present)

Career highlights
- NBA champion (2025)

Clayton Ike Bennett (born November 14, 1959) is an American businessman and chairman of the Professional Basketball Club LLC, the ownership group of the Oklahoma City Thunder, an NBA franchise formerly known as the Seattle SuperSonics. Bennett is the chairman of Oklahoma City-based Dorchester Capital Corporation, as well as the chairman emeritus of the board of directors of the Oklahoma Heritage Association and served as chairman of the Board of Regents of the University of Oklahoma from 2011 to 2019.

== Early business career ==
Bennett was one of the owners of the San Antonio Spurs in the mid-1990s, where one of his primary duties was to represent the team on the NBA Board of Governors. Immediately before the 2005–06 NBA season, Bennett, along with Aubrey McClendon of Oklahoma City-based Chesapeake Energy Corporation, Tom L. Ward of Oklahoma City-based SandRidge Energy Corporation, and G. Jeffrey Records Jr. of Oklahoma City-based MidFirst Bank, partnered with the city of Oklahoma City and the state of Oklahoma in providing a revenue guarantee for the NBA's New Orleans Hornets. This resulted in the relocation of the Hornets to Oklahoma City for two seasons. The temporary relocation to Oklahoma City stemmed from damage to the arena and infrastructure in New Orleans caused by Hurricane Katrina.

== Oklahoma City Thunder ==
Bennett is the chairman of the Oklahoma City-based Professional Basketball Club LLC (PBC), which owns the NBA's Oklahoma City Thunder. Formerly known as the Seattle SuperSonics, the team was purchased from Howard Schultz in 2006 for approximately $350 million with Bennett promising a good-faith effort to keep the team in Seattle, provided there would be a public commitment to a new arena. After failing to get $500 million in public funding from local taxes to build a new suburban arena for the team, Bennett notified the NBA on November 2, 2007, of the ownership group's intent to move the team to Oklahoma City. On March 21, 2008, Bennett made known his plan to relocate the basketball franchise. On April 18, 2008, NBA owners gave approval to move the franchise from Seattle for the 2008–2009 season pending the outcome of the city's case to uphold the lease and the former ownership group's lawsuit to rescind the purchase. On July 2, 2008, Bennett's ownership group reached a settlement agreement in the lawsuit filed by the city of Seattle, thus allowing the franchise to move from Seattle to Oklahoma City.

On April 15, 2011, Bennett was named chairman of the NBA's relocation committee.

On May 15, 2013, Bennett was a part of the board of governors that voted, 22–8, against a proposed relocation of the Sacramento Kings to Seattle.

On March 25, 2026, Bennett was a part of the board of governors that voted unanimously to explore adding expansion teams in Seattle and Las Vegas. The approval paves the path the possible revival of the SuperSonics, which Bennett is the owner of Oklahoma City Thunder ceding the Sonics' history back to Seattle.

== Personal life ==
Bennett is married to Louise Gaylord Bennett, the daughter of Oklahoma City media mogul Edward L. Gaylord. Bennett and Louise Gaylord were high school sweethearts, meeting when he was a sophomore and she was a freshman. They have three children. Bennett's in-laws also have ties to professional sports ownership, as the Gaylords once owned a minority share of the Texas Rangers—a share which was later sold to future Republican President George W. Bush. Bennett is a Republican. Bennett is chairman of a task force identifying and seeking criminal justice reforms to alleviate jail overcrowding in Oklahoma City.

Sporting positions
Preceded by Howard Schultz	Seattle SuperSonics principal owner Oklahoma City Thunder principal owner 2006–present	Incumbent
Preceded by Howard Schultz	Seattle Storm principal owner 2006–2008	Succeeded by Lisa Brummel; Ginny Gilder; Dawn Trudeau
Business positions
First	Professional Basketball Club, Chairman/CEO; 2006–present	Incumbent
