= Aubrey McClendon =

American businessman (1959–2016)

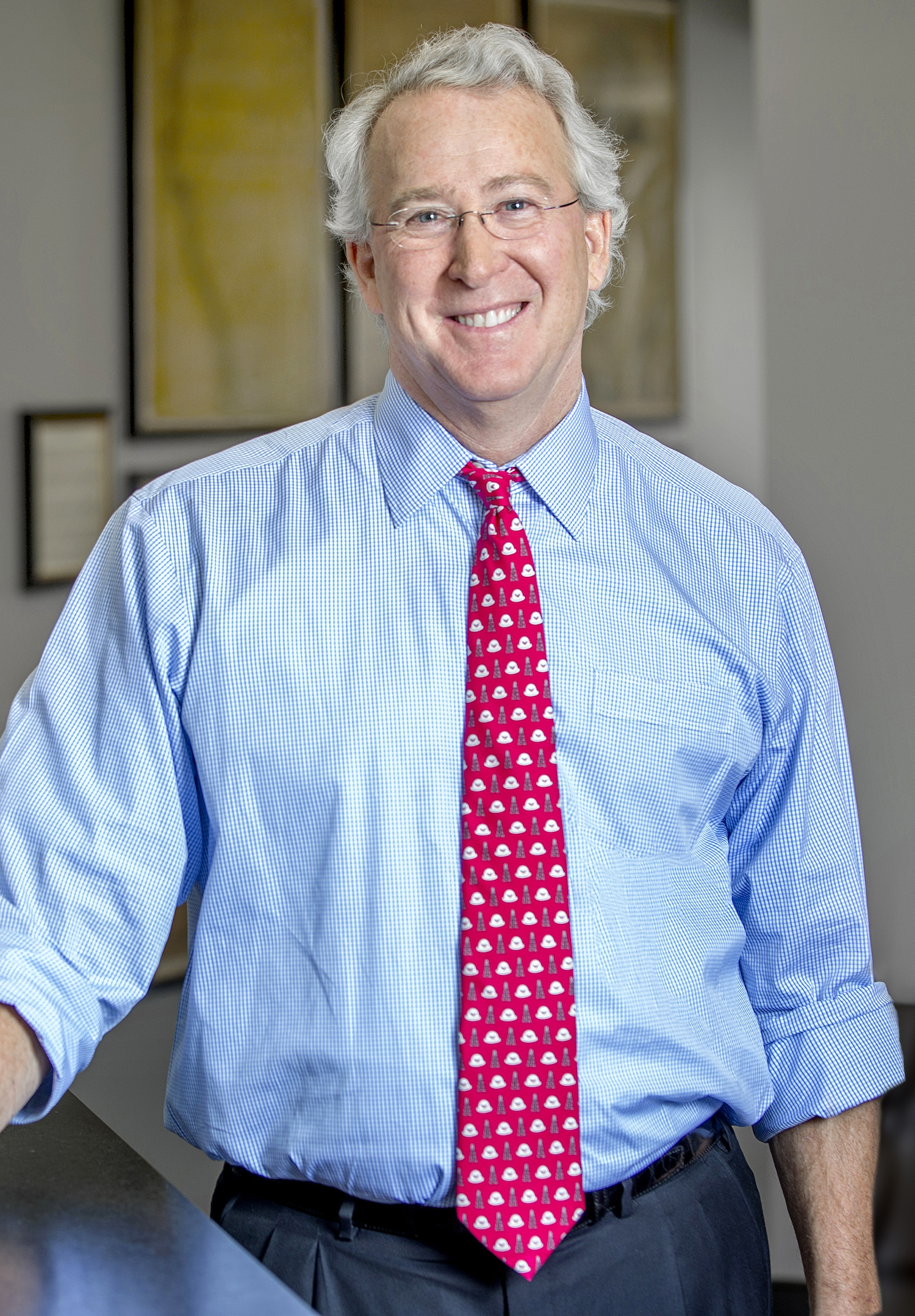
- McClendon in 2014
- Born: Aubrey Kerr McClendon; July 14, 1959; Oklahoma City, Oklahoma, U.S.
- Died: March 2, 2016 (aged 56); Oklahoma City, Oklahoma, U.S.
- Education: Duke University (BA)
- Occupation: CEO
- Organization(s): American Energy Partners, LP former CEO of Chesapeake Energy

Aubrey Kerr McClendon (July 14, 1959 – March 2, 2016) was an American businessman primarily engaged in natural gas exploration. He was the co-founder, CEO and chairman of Chesapeake Energy (now Expand Energy), and, after being forced from the company due to a possible conflict of interest, he was the founder and chief executive officer of American Energy Partners, LP. He was an outspoken advocate for natural gas as an alternative to oil and coal fuels, and a pioneer in employing hydraulic fracturing.

McClendon owned 19% of Professional Basketball Club, which owns the Oklahoma City Thunder and was instrumental in the Seattle SuperSonics relocation to Oklahoma City in 2008.

On March 1, 2016, McClendon was indicted by a federal grand jury on charges of conspiring "to rig bids for the purchase of oil and natural gas leases in northwest Oklahoma". He died the following day in a single-vehicle collision.

== Early life and education ==
McClendon was born July 14, 1959, in Oklahoma City, Oklahoma, the son of Carole Kerr and Joe Connor McClendon. He was the great-nephew of Robert S. Kerr, a governor of Oklahoma and U.S. senator from the state and a co-founder of Kerr-McGee.

McClendon spent his childhood in Belle Isle, a neighborhood in Oklahoma City and attended Belle Isle Elementary School, a public school. He graduated from Heritage Hall School in 1977, where he was senior class president and co-valedictorian. As a teenager, McClendon started a lawn mowing business.

McClendon graduated from Duke in 1981 with a B.A. in history. His favorite area of study was the post-Civil War Reconstruction Era. McClendon minored in accounting and was a member of Sigma Alpha Epsilon fraternity. He also met his wife, Kathleen Upton Byrns, while at Duke.

McClendon's first job after Duke was as an accountant. He was inspired to move from accounting to the energy business after reading an article in The Wall Street Journal about two men selling their Anadarko Basin well stake for $100 million. McClendon worked as a landman at Jaytex Oil and Gas, a public company in Oklahoma City founded by his uncle, Aubrey M. Kerr Jr. McClendon left Jaytex in November 1982 to start his own oil business.

== Business career ==
=== Chesapeake Energy ===
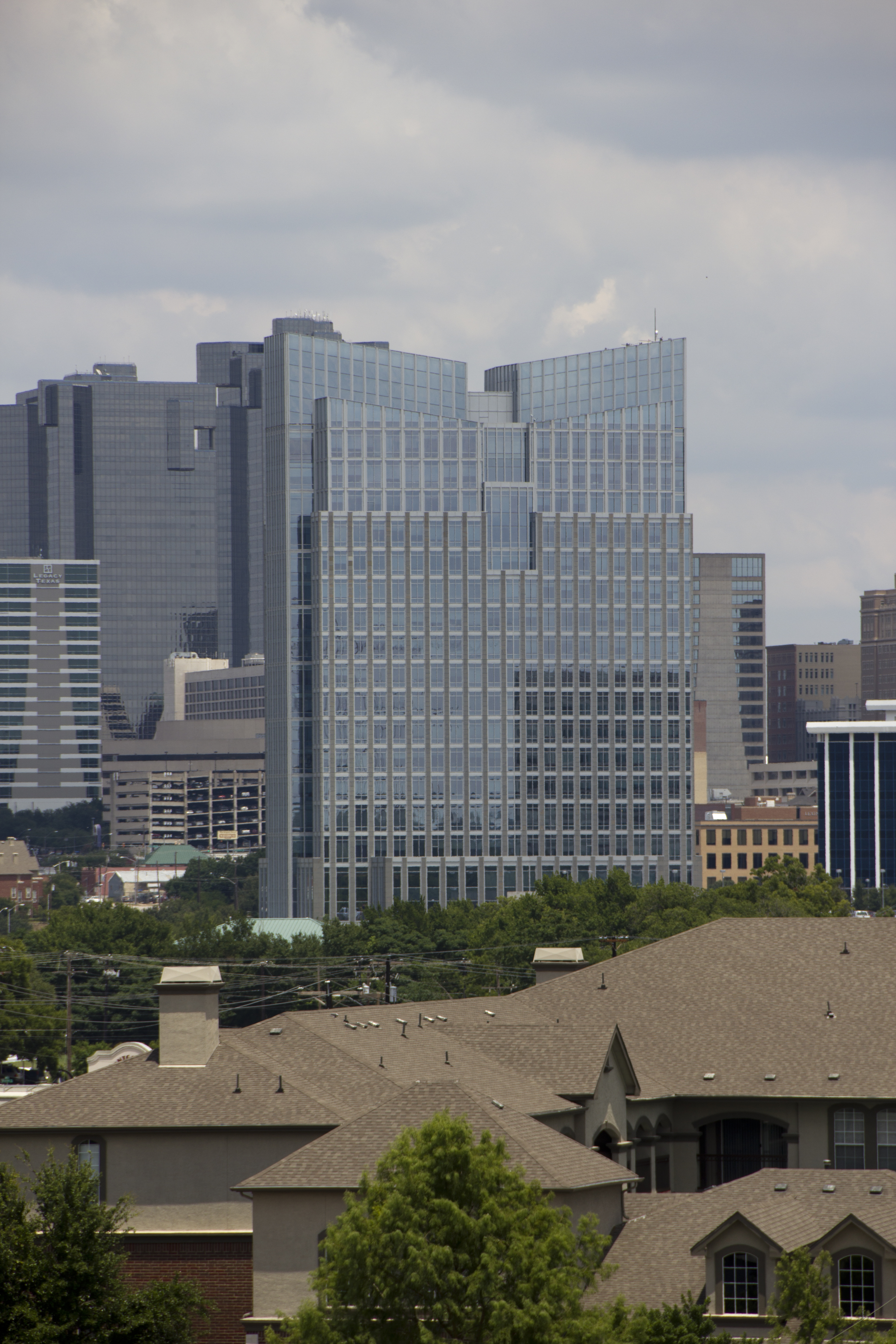
The Chesapeake Energy Building in Fort Worth, Texas, from 2008 to 2014, now Fort Worth City Hall.

In 1983, McClendon and Tom L. Ward, both 23-years old, "threw in together" in their initial venture into oil and natural gas after competing against each other on bidding for land. He lived above the office space they leased and, after the oil bust in the late 1980s, moved to New York for 6 months to contemplate switching careers. However, he moved back to Oklahoma City and in 1989 he and Ward, both age 29, founded Chesapeake Energy. McClendon began as chairman and chief executive officer of Chesapeake, while Ward served as president and chief financial officer. The company began drilling its first two oil wells in Garvin County, Oklahoma, in May 1989.

McClendon focused on drilling wells into unconventional reservoirs such as fractured carbonate rock and shales and was an early adopter of directional drilling and hydraulic fracturing techniques, which helped accelerate the company's fast early growth. His focus on these new and unconventional techniques later led to him being called a "visionary leader" in the oil and natural gas industry.

The firm became a public company via an initial public offering in 1993, and its stock price rose 274% in value from 1994 to 1997.

In 2005, Forbes named McClendon one of the country's top-performing executives for his role at Chesapeake.

During the 2008 financial crisis, Chesapeake's stock price fell 75% in a few months and McClendon was forced to sell 94% of his 31.5 million shares, equal to 6% of the company, to repay a margin loan. The following year, Chesapeake offered McClendon a five-year retention contract, including a $75 million cash bonus.

In 2011, Forbes called McClendon "America's most reckless billionaire", noting his high risk tolerance and cited the leveraging and forced sale of his shares in 2008 as a reckless move. The same year, the magazine named McClendon to its 20-20 Club, comprising the eight CEOs of public companies who had delivered annualized returns of more than 20% over a 20-year period.

Chesapeake grew its gas production under McClendon from 5 million to 2.5 billion cubic feet per day from 2009 to 2013. Chesapeake's discovery of large reserves of natural gas was reported to have helped reduce natural gas prices to consumers in the U.S.

==== Possible conflicts of interest as CEO of Cheseapeake Energy ====
- McClendon nominated several of his friends, including long time childhood friends, to the board of directors of the company and made them the highest-paid directors in the petroleum industry. In return, the board made McClendon the highest paid CEO of any company in the S&P 500, awarding him a pay package of $112 million, including $75 million over 5 years to buy interests in wells drilled by Chesapeake, a $20 million stock grant, and $12 million to buy his map collection. The board also atypically allowed McClendon to trade commodities and run a hedge fund, despite the possible conflict of interest.
- McClendon had the company develop a shopping center near the company's headquarters and lease space to restaurants part-owned by McClendon. The company used these restaurants for millions of dollars' worth of catering business.
- When McClendon needed money, he convinced the board to have the company purchase his collection of rare maps hanging in the company's offices for $12 million. In November 2011, to settle a shareholder lawsuit, McClendon agreed to buy back the maps for $12 million plus 2.28% interest and pay associated legal fees.
- An entire department at the company, known as "AKM Operations" was dedicated to working on personal projects of McClendon, including having his house fixed after a hail storm. McClendon had allegedly used Chesapeake employees to perform $3 million of personal work, including engineering and accounting support and the repair of his house, in 2010. He had also used business jets for non-business-related travel for the McClendons' family and friends, including trips to Europe and Bermuda. According to Chesapeake, McClendon reimbursed the company for all but $250,000 of the employee costs. His employment agreement authorized the personal use of company aircraft by McClendon, his immediate family members and guests, "for safety, security and efficiency" reasons.
- The company paid $3 million per year for the naming and branding rights to the Chesapeake Energy Arena, where the Oklahoma City Thunder play. The company also committed to buy $3 million worth of tickets per year. McClendon owned a 19% interest in the team.
- Since McClendon was a history major and loved history, he hired a company historian, who was paid a salary of over $100,000 per year. He also hired the World's Strongest Man, who also received a salary of over $100,000 per year, to promote exercise among company staff.
- Through the Founders Well Participation Program, McClendon was able to purchase a 2.5% interest in every well the company drills. McClendon borrowed as much as $1.1 billion against his 2.5% stake in thousands of company wells from banks that were also lenders to the company. This created a possible conflict of interest whereby McClendon could act to benefit his personal interests as opposed to those of the company. After this potential conflict was made public, the company terminated the Founders Well Participation Program. The U.S. Securities and Exchange Commission opened an informal inquiry of McClendon's borrowing practices. However, no enforcement action was taken.

In June 2012, Chesapeake shareholders voted to reject two board members and approve increased proxy access. McClendon relinquished his chairman title in June 2012, remaining in his role as CEO. In February 2013, an internal review by the board of directors of Chesapeake, assisted by Locke Lord and WilmerHale, found no improper conduct, no improper benefit to McClendon and no increased cost to the company. McClendon resigned from his position as CEO at Chesapeake on April 1, 2013.

Following his departure from the company, McClendon retained the option to continue investing in wells drilled by Chesapeake through July 2014. The interests in the wells were held by three companies, two of which were transferred to banks as part of possible foreclosures and one of which was transferred to Clay Bennett.

In February 2015, Chesapeake filed a lawsuit against McClendon, accusing him of misappropriating company data on available land during his departure, using trade secrets at Chesapeake for American Energy Partners, LP, a new company that he founded. McClendon and American Energy Partners responded that he had the right to all information in his possession under his various separation agreements with Chesapeake. In April 2015, American Energy – Utica, LLC reached a settlement with Chesapeake, giving Chesapeake 6,000 acres (2,400 ha) of land and $25 million. The lawsuit with Chesapeake was settled with McClendon's estate in February 2017; the estate agreed to pay legal fees of $3.25 million.

=== American Energy Partners, LP ===
In April 2013, McClendon founded American Energy Partners, LP, a hydrocarbon exploration company based in Oklahoma City. In 2013 and 2014, McClendon hired more than 600 employees, mostly from Chesapeake Energy, and raised equity and debt commitments of approximately $15 billion. The company was liquidated after the death of McClendon.

=== Federal indictment for violating antitrust laws ===
On March 1, 2016, a federal grand jury indicted McClendon for violating antitrust laws, with conspiring to suppress prices paid for oil and natural gas leases by allegedly rigging the bidding process. The indictment says he orchestrated a conspiracy in which two oil and gas companies colluded not to bid against each other for the purchase of leases in northwestern Oklahoma. The conspiracy he is suspected of was orchestrating a scheme between two large energy companies, which are not named in the indictment, that was conducted from December 2007 through March 2012. According to the indictment, the companies would decide ahead of time who would win bids, with the winner then allocating an interest in the leases to the other company, eliminating open competitive bidding with landowners. One of the unnamed companies in the indictment was SandRidge Energy. The United States Justice Department said this was the first case resulting from a continuing federal antitrust investigation into price fixing, bid rigging and other anticompetitive conduct in the oil and natural gas industry. In 2015, Chesapeake Energy settled charges of antitrust, fraud, and racketeering violations out of court, by agreeing to pay $25 million as compensation to landowners with leases.

After his indictment McClendon released a statement denying all charges, arguing that for 35 years he has worked to create jobs and help Oklahoma's economy while providing plentiful energy for the entire country.

McClendon maintained his innocence, but died the next day, March 2, 2016, in a single-occupant single-vehicle crash when he drove his SUV at 88 mph into a concrete bridge embankment.

== Other business ventures and investments ==
McClendon held a stake in various food service companies and restaurants, including Jamba Juice. He also held stakes in several Oklahoma City restaurants, including Irma's Burger Shack, Deep Fork Grill, The Coach House, Republic Gastro Pub, Metro Wine Bistro & Bar, Provision Kitchen and Pops. McClendon opened Pops, a burgers and soda restaurant on the historic Route 66 highway in Arcadia, Oklahoma, in 2007.

From 2004 to 2008, McClendon ran a $200 million hedge fund, Heritage Management Company LLC, with Tom Ward.

He invested $35 million in ProCure Treatment Centers Inc., a company with three proton therapy based cancer treatment centers, in 2008.

=== Land ownership ===
From 2004 to 2006, McClendon bought almost 400 acres (160 ha) of mostly undeveloped dunes on the east coast of Lake Michigan and the Kalamazoo River for $39.5 million. He had previously secured a half-interest on the land in 2004. In 2006, the five-member Township Board representing Saugatuck, Michigan voted unanimously to rezone the land, making development more difficult. The Township Board supported the views of local citizens and the Saugatuck Dunes Coastal Alliance, who argued that McClendon's plans for development would irrevocably damage the property. He continued with the land purchase, and in 2007, began discussions with township officials on reducing the restrictions. In 2009, McClendon sold 171 acres (69 ha) of the land to the Western Michigan Land Conservancy. In December 2010, McClendon filed a federal lawsuit attempting to overturn the zoning laws and a settlement was reached in 2012 which voided Saugatuck's 2006 rezoning.

From 2008 to 2013, McClendon was one of the U.S.'s largest landowners, owning more than 100,000 acres (40,000 ha).

=== Oklahoma City Thunder ===
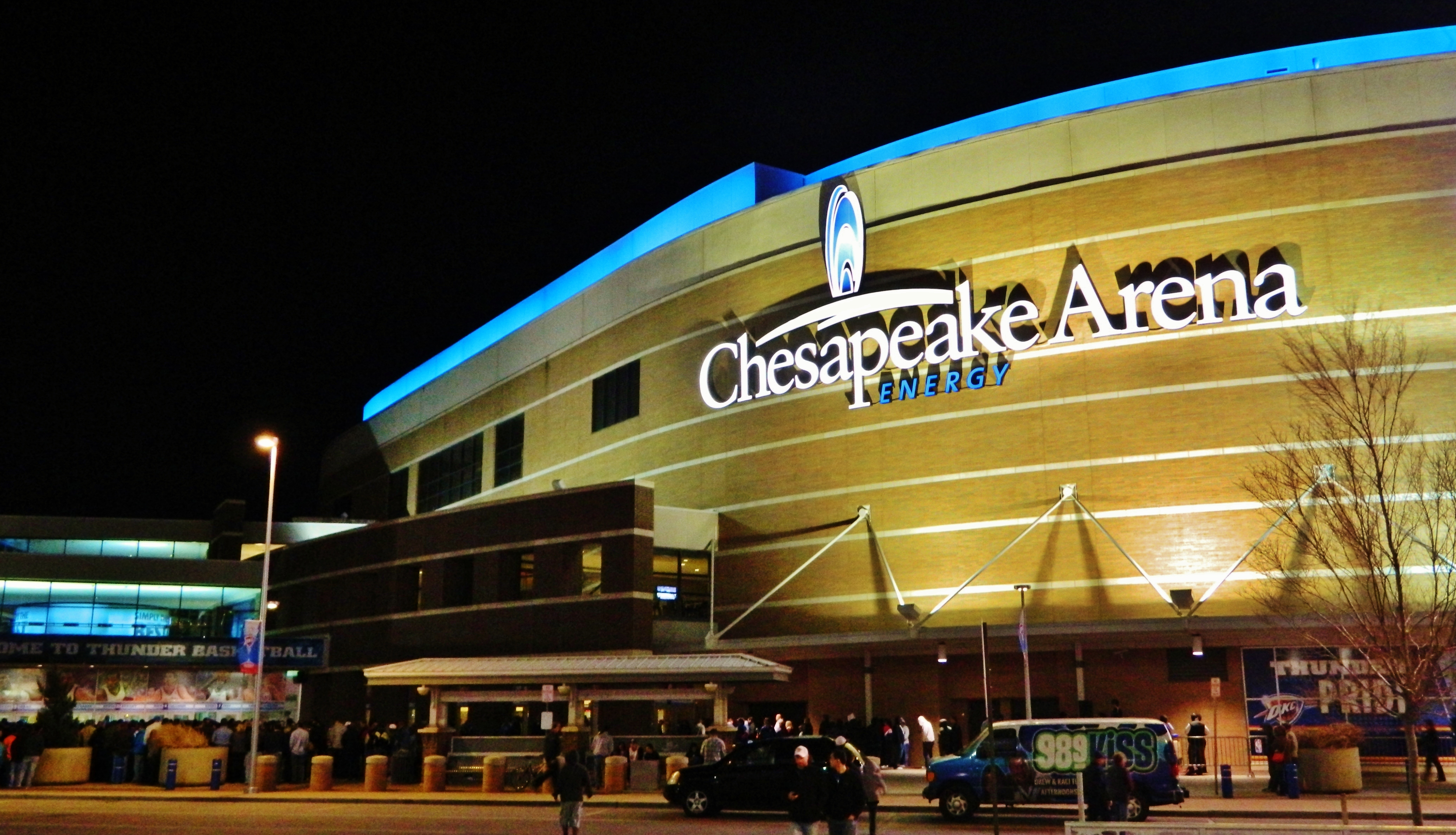
The Chesapeake Energy Arena, home of the Oklahoma City Thunder.

McClendon was an original member of the Professional Basketball Club, which owns the National Basketball Association (NBA)'s Oklahoma City Thunder franchise. He was a part of the team that moved the Seattle SuperSonics to Oklahoma City in 2008, where they were renamed the Oklahoma City Thunder. At the time of the move, McClendon owned 20% of the team.

Prior to the move, in 2007, McClendon was quoted in The Journal Record, an Oklahoma City newspaper, as saying "we (the ownership group) didn't buy the Seattle SuperSonics to keep them in Seattle". The NBA fined McClendon $250,000 in response, as his statement contradicted the organization's publicized intentions at the time. In April 2014, he purchased more shares in the Oklahoma City Thunder franchise from G. Jeffrey Records Jr.

== Philanthropy and community involvement ==
McClendon made sizable donations to and served on the board of directors for many municipal and private organizations in Oklahoma City, including the Boathouse District and Boathouse Foundation, The McClendon Family Boys and Girls Club of OKC, the Oklahoma City Chamber of Commerce, Oklahoma State Fair and Oklahoma City Public Schools. He donated to Oklahoma City arts organizations, including the Lyric Theatre, Oklahoma City Ballet, Oklahoma City Museum of Art, Arts Council of Oklahoma City, the Oklahoma Heritage Foundation and the Oklahoma City Philharmonic.

From 2011 on, McClendon hosted an annual event for local Boy Scouts of America at his Arcadia Farm property. He donated approximately $15 million to Duke University and $12.5 million to the University of Oklahoma.

== Honors and awards ==
McClendon was inducted into the Oklahoma Heritage Foundation's Oklahoma Hall of Fame in 2007, and in 2009, he was a top finalist for CEO of the Year at the Platts Global Energy Awards.

In 2010, U.S. Steel Tubular Products, a subsidiary of U.S. Steel, gave McClendon the Chief Roughneck Award, which honors the lifetime achievements of petroleum industry leaders.

In 2011, McClendon was awarded the Ernst & Young National Entrepreneur of the Year in Energy, Cleantech and Natural Resources. In 2013, the Heritage Hall School Alumni Association named McClendon, who graduated in 1977, the recipient of its Distinguished Alumni Award.

== Lobbying and natural gas advocacy ==
In 2004, then CEO McClendon contributed $450,000 to the campaign of Tom Corbett for attorney general of Pennsylvania. These funds were cited as the reason Corbett won the election, with a narrow margin. When Corbett eventually became governor of Pennsylvania, he was very supportive of Chesapeake's fracking activity in Pennsylvania, and Pennsylvania was the only state without a severance tax on drillers, despite the fact that the budget for education was being reduced.

In 2008, then CEO McClendon formed American Clean Skies Foundation, a non-profit foundation focused on selling the virtues of natural gas. The foundation was funded by the company and by McClendon. The foundation was criticized for doing nothing but pushing Congress to pass policies that benefited the company and McClendon's business interests.

McClendon was a founding member of America's Natural Gas Alliance (ANGA), a trade association and lobbying group for independent natural gas producers, based in Washington, D.C. He was an advocate for the greater use of natural gas in the United States and he funded a campaign in 2007 to draw clean-energy activists' attention to a Texas utility's plan to build 11 new coal plants. He also made a donation to the Sierra Club to fund its "Beyond Coal" campaign, which had blocked more than 150 new coal plants in the United States, as of October 2013.

In an appearance on 60 Minutes in 2010, McClendon argued a case for natural gas as a clean fuel and a significant job-creating industry. He defended the natural gas and oil industry's use of hydraulic fracturing techniques for well completion, claiming it could reduce the impact of OPEC, create jobs for Americans, and reduce costs.

== Personal life and interests ==
McClendon lived in Oklahoma City with his wife, Kathleen Upton Byrns. They have three adult children: Jack, Callie, and Will. His wife is a cousin of Sports Illustrated supermodel Kate Upton and is also related to Louis Upton, the founder of Whirlpool Corporation.

McClendon had a personal wine collection that he estimated at one time to include more than the equivalent of 100,000 bottles. He sold much of the collection when he needed cash and after it appreciated; the remainder was sold after his death. He also held an extensive collection of antique maps of Oklahoma and collected vintage motor boats.

McClendon, an Episcopalian, would sometimes quote scripture in workplace emails. He also employed chaplains while CEO of Chesapeake.

McClendon was the main investor in Magnises, a credit card-based venture of convicted fraudster Billy McFarland, co-founder of the Fyre Festival, later described as a scam.

McClendon was regarded as an optimistic person, with an appetite for risk beyond most people's comfort level, by several people who knew him well.

== Death ==
According to police reports, McClendon died instantly at 9:12 a.m. on March 2, 2016, when his 2013 Chevrolet Tahoe SUV, traveling at 88 miles per hour (142 km/h), crashed into a concrete overpass for the Turner Turnpike on Midwest Boulevard in Oklahoma City in a solo-occupant, single-vehicle crash. The event occurred one day after McClendon's indictment by a federal grand jury accusing him of violating antitrust laws from 2007 to 2012 while the CEO of Chesapeake Energy. However, no arraignments or meetings were scheduled with McClendon on the day of his car accident.

McClendon's body was badly burned, making identification difficult. A forensic odontologist positively identified McClendon by his teeth on March 4, 2016. The medical examiner's office reported McClendon died from multiple blunt force trauma. On March 3, 2016, less than 48 hours after McClendon was charged, the Justice Department filed motions and dismissed McClendon's indictment. On June 8, 2016, the Oklahoma medical examiner officially ruled the crash which killed McClendon was an accident. According to the autopsy report, no alcohol was involved in the accident, but an unspecified amount of the over-the-counter first-generation antihistamine and short-term sedative drug Doxylamine (which is used as an antihistamine or to treat insomnia) was found in McClendon's system. He was not wearing a seat belt at the time of the crash but this was not unusual for McClendon.

Oklahoma City Police spokesman Paco Balderrama said of McClendon's actions, "He pretty much drove straight into the wall. The information out there at the scene is that he went left of center, went through a grassy area right before colliding into the embankment. There was plenty of opportunity for him to correct and get back on the roadway, and that didn't occur." There was no evidence of suicide, although there was the possibility of a medical event.
