= Professional Basketball Club =

American investment group

Professional Basketball Club LLC
- Company type: Private
- Predecessor: Basketball Club of Seattle
- Founded: 2006
- Headquarters: 208 Thunder Drive, Oklahoma City, OK 73102, U.S.
- Key people: Clayton I. Bennett (Chairman, CEO)
- Total assets: estimated $590 million
- Members: Jeffrey Records Jr. (significant); George Kaiser (19.23%); Clayton I. Bennett; William Cameron; Jay Scaramucci; Everett R. Dobson; Robert E. Howard II
- Divisions: Oklahoma City Thunder; Oklahoma City Blue

Professional Basketball Club LLC is an investment group headed by Clay Bennett that owns the National Basketball Association (NBA)'s Oklahoma City Thunder franchise (formerly the Seattle SuperSonics) and the Thunder's NBA G League affiliate Oklahoma City Blue. The group also owned the Women's National Basketball Association (WNBA)'s Seattle Storm franchise from 2006 to 2008. The PBC then sold the Storm to local Seattle owners, before relocating the SuperSonics to Oklahoma City.

== History ==
On July 18, 2006, Basketball Club of Seattle, led by Howard Schultz, sold the Seattle SuperSonics and Seattle Storm to Professional Basketball Club after failing to reach an agreement with the city of Seattle over a publicly funded $220 million expansion of KeyArena. The team relocated to Oklahoma City and began play as the Oklahoma City Thunder in the 2008–09 basketball season, becoming the third NBA franchise to relocate in the 2000s.

The Professional Basketball Club on January 8, 2008, sold the Storm to an ownership group consisting of four Seattle businesswomen. On July 31, 2008, the Tulsa 66ers, now Oklahoma City Blue, announced that Professional Basketball Club had purchased the team, marking the third NBA Development League team to be owned by an NBA team (Los Angeles Lakers and San Antonio Spurs).

In September 2013, the OKC Thunder added station KAKC, the 66ers' radio broadcasting partner, to its Thunder Radio Network. In April 2014, George Kaiser bought Tom L. Ward's interest in Professional Basketball Club, while Jeffrey Records Jr. sold part of his stake to Bennett while two other changed their stakes.

== Former members ==
- Tom L. Ward
- Aubrey McClendon (died on March 2, 2016)
- G. Edward Evans
