= Archie W. Dunham =

American business executive (born 1938)

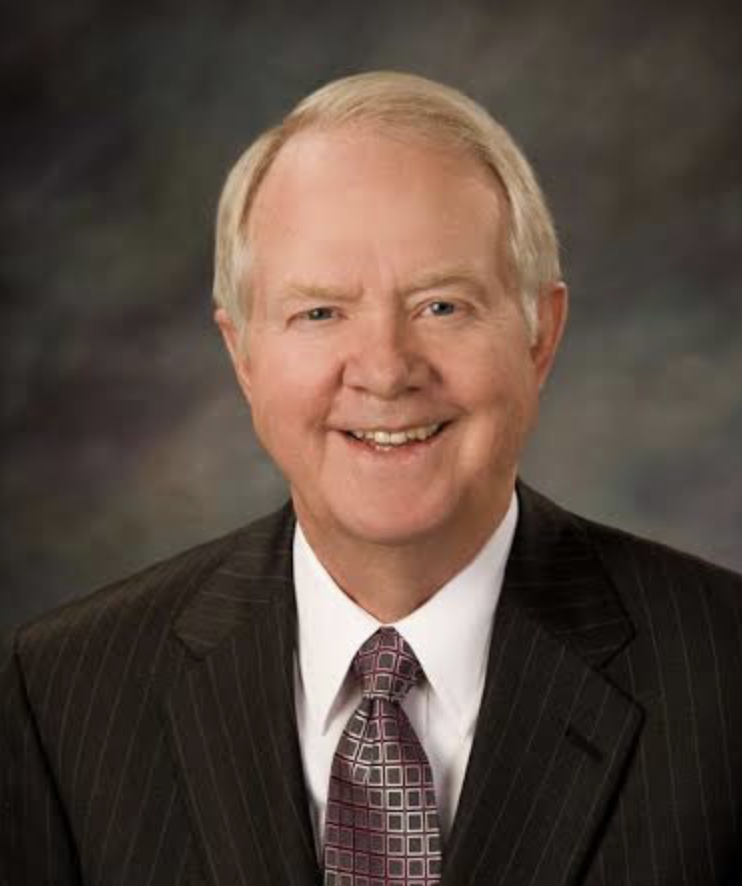
- Born: December 20, 1938 (age 87)
- Education: University of Oklahoma
- Occupation: Businessperson
- Years active: 1966–2004
- Employer: ConocoPhillips
- Title: President & CEO (1996–2002), Chairman (2002–2004)
- Predecessor: Constantine S. "Dino" Nicandros
- Successor: James Mulva
- Board member of: National Petroleum Council
- Spouse: Linda Dunham (deceased)
- Children: 3: Steven, Laura and Cary

Archie Wallace Dunham (born December 20, 1938) served as president and chief executive officer of Conoco Inc. from January 1996 to August 2002, then as chairman of ConocoPhillips, following the merger of Conoco Inc. and Phillips Petroleum Company, until his retirement on September 30, 2004. Dunham was chairman of Chesapeake Energy (now Expand Energy) from 2012 to 2015 and chairman emeritus from 2015 to 2019.

== Early life and education ==
Dunham grew up in Oklahoma. After earning a bachelor's degree in geological engineering from the University of Oklahoma in 1960, he was commissioned as a second lieutenant in the United States Marine Corps. Dunham served four years in the Marines, then returned to the University of Oklahoma to complete an MBA in 1966.

== Career ==
Archie Dunham joined Conoco Inc. in 1966 and subsequently held a number of commercial and managerial positions within Conoco and DuPont. Dunham served as senior vice president of polymers and executive vice president of DuPont, Conoco's former parent, from 1995 to October 1998. Dunham served as executive vice president of exploration and production and executive vice president of refining, marketing, supply and transportation for Conoco. He served as chairman, president, and CEO of Conoco Inc. (integrated energy company) from August 1999 to August 2002 and also served as chairman of ConocoPhillips (integrated energy company) from August 2002, following the merger of Conoco Inc. and Phillips Petroleum Company, until his retirement on September 30, 2004.

Dunham was previously a board director of DuPont, Phelps Dodge, Pride International, Union Pacific and Louisiana-Pacific.

He was past Chairman of the United States Energy Association, the National Petroleum Council and the National Association of Manufacturers. Dunham is also a member of the board of visitors at the University of Oklahoma. He was a director of the American Petroleum Institute, the U.S.–Russia Business Council and the Greater Houston Partnership. He served on the board of the Memorial Hermann Healthcare System in Houston, the board of visitors of M.D. Anderson Cancer Center, the board of trustees of the Houston Symphony, the George Bush Presidential Library, and the Smithsonian Institution. He served as a trustee of Houston Grand Opera and was a member of The Business Council and The Business Roundtable. He was also a former member of the Deutsche Bank advisory board of directors.

In 2012, Dunham was appointed Independent Non-executive chairman of Chesapeake Energy (now Expand Energy). He was chairman emeritus from 2015 to 2019, when he retired from the company.

== Marriage and children ==
Archie and Linda Dunham married in 1960. The couple have three children: Steven, Laura, and Cary.

== Awards ==
- 1996: Inducted into the University of Oklahoma College of Engineering as "distinguished graduate." Distinguished Graduates Society
- 1998 Community Partners Houston Father of the Year
- 1998: Inducted into Oklahoma Hall of Fame
- 1999: Honorary Doctorate in humane letters from the University of Oklahoma.
- 2000: New York Mercantile Exchange award for CEO of the Year for Global Vision in Energy
- 2000: International Achievement Award by B'nai B'rith
- 2001: Horatio Alger Association of Distinguished Americans
- 2001: Ellis Island Medal of Honor
- 2003: Honorary Doctorate in humane letters from Houston Baptist University
- 2004: Greater Houston Partnership International Executive of the Year
- 2005: John Rogers Award
- 2006: Inducted into Offshore Energy Center Hall of Fame
- 2010: Houston Baptist University Spirit of Excellence Award
- 2011: U.S. Marine Corps Globe and Anchor Award
- 2014: Houston Baptist University President's Award
- 2017: University of Oklahoma Trailblazer Award
- 2018: Houston Baptist University Founders Medal

Preceded by Constantine S. "Dino" Nicandros	Chief Executive Officer of Conoco Inc. January 1, 1996-August 30, 2002	Succeeded by
Preceded by Edgar S. Woolard Jr.	Chairman of Conoco Inc. August 1999-August 30, 2002	Succeeded by
Preceded by New title	Chairman of ConocoPhillips; August 30, 2002-September 30, 2004	Succeeded by James Mulva
