= Expand Energy =

American energy company

Expand Energy Corporation
- Type: Public
- Traded as: Nasdaq: EXE; S&P 500 component
- Industry: Petroleum industry
- Predecessors: Chesapeake Energy; Southwestern Energy
- Founded: 1989; 37 years ago
- Founders: Aubrey McClendon; Tom L. Ward
- Headquarters: Spring, Texas, U.S.
- Key people: Michael Wichterich (Executive Chairman, Interim CEO); Marcel Teunissen (CFO)
- Products: Natural gas
- Production output: 7,183 MMcfe of natural gas per day (2025)
- Revenue: ▲US$12.124 billion (2025)
- Operating income: ▲US$2.471 billion (2025)
- Net income: ▲US$1.819 billion (2025)
- Total assets: ▲US$28.287 billion (2025)
- Total equity: ▲US$18.578 billion (2025)
- Number of employees: c. 1,600 (2025)
- Website: expandenergy.com

Expand Energy Corporation (known as Chesapeake Energy until 2024) is the largest independent natural gas producer in the U.S., based on net daily production. Headquartered in Spring, Texas, the company operates in the Appalachian Basin of the Marcellus Formation in Pennsylvania and West Virginia, as well as the Haynesville Shale in Northwestern Louisiana.

In 2025, the company produced 7,183 MMcfe of natural gas per day. In 2025, 42% of production was from the Haynesville Shale, 36% of production was from Northeast Appalachia, and 22% of production was from Southwest Appalachia. As of December 31, 2025, the company had 25,880 Bcf of proved reserves. It also had interests in 6,600 gross productive wells.

== History ==
Chesapeake Energy logo

The company was founded in 1989 as Chesapeake Energy by Aubrey McClendon and Tom L. Ward with an initial investment of $50,000. McClendon named the company after Chesapeake Bay due to his love of the region. Ward left the company in 2006 to establish SandRidge Energy. In 1993, the company became a public company via an initial public offering, with a valuation of $25 million. Focusing on a strategy of drilling horizontal natural gas wells in unconventional reservoirs, the company built a sizable position in the Golden Trend and Sholem Alechem fields of South-central Oklahoma and in the Giddings field of Southeast Texas. In the mid-1990s, the company unsuccessfully attempted to extend the Austin Chalk play into western and central Louisiana. In 1997, the company wrote down the value of its assets by over $200 million, approximately equal to shareholder's equity at the time, due to low commodity prices and implemented a turnaround plan.

In the early 2000s, after a rise in natural gas prices made it economically feasible, the company focused on unconventional drilling in carbonates, tight sandstone, and shale particularly in the Barnett Shale, Fayetteville Shale, and the Marcellus Formation. In 2008, the company announced its discovery of the Haynesville Shale in East Texas and northwestern Louisiana. In 2009, the company partnered with Orange County Choppers to create the first chopper powered by compressed natural gas.

In April 2011, due to a failed seal assembly in a wellhead, the company lost control of a natural gas well in Bradford County, Pennsylvania that was being fracture stimulated, causing a large spill of salt water and chemicals, such as 2-butoxyethanol and methanol, into the surrounding countryside. After three days, the leak had been stemmed. Maryland announced its intention to sue the company for violation of the Resource Conservation and Recovery Act and the Clean Water Act since fracking fluids from the well blowout wound up in the Chesapeake Bay. In July 2011, the company agreed to a 12-year naming rights partnership with the Oklahoma City Thunder for naming and branding rights of the Paycom Center at a cost of $3 million per year, with annual increases of 3%. In April 2021, the agreement was terminated.

In June 2012, in response to shareholder concerns about corporate governance issues under McClendon's watch, the company appointed Archie W. Dunham as chairman, while Aubrey McClendon remained CEO. In mid-2012, the U.S. Department of Justice (DOJ) began an investigation into whether Encana, Canada's largest natural gas company, "illegally colluded with Chesapeake Energy Corp to lower the price of Michigan exploration lands during a public land auction in May 2010". The antitrust probe ended in 2014 with a letter to Chesapeake by the U.S. Department of Justice. Internal investigations by the companies found no evidence of collusion. In December 2012, the company sold midstream assets for $2.16 billion.

Effective April 2013, Aubrey McClendon was forced to leave the company after revelations that he took a personal stake in wells owned by the company and then used those investments as collateral for up to $1.1 billion in loans from banks that also financed the company, prompting an investigation by the U.S. Securities and Exchange Commission. He was also accused of several conflicts of interest. In May 2013, Robert Douglas Lawler, an executive of Anadarko Petroleum, was named CEO of the company. In September 2013, the company agreed to pay $7.5 million to settle a class action lawsuit by Pennsylvania landowners. In 2013, the company sold 55,000 net acres in the Northern Eagle Ford Shale and 9,600 net acres in the Haynesville Shale to EXCO for aggregate proceeds of $1 billion. In December 2013, the United States Environmental Protection Agency fined a subsidiary of the company $3.2 million, and ordered it to pay an estimated $6.5 million for the restoration of sites that were damaged by the company from unauthorized discharge of material.

In February 2014, the company sold additional midstream assets for $520 million. In June 2014, the state of Michigan filed felony fraud and racketeering charges against the company, alleging that the company canceled hundreds of land leases on false pretenses after it sought to obtain oil and gas rights. Michigan attorney general Bill Schuette claimed that the company "obtained uncompensated land options from these landowners by false pretenses, and prevented competitors from leasing the land". Chesapeake Energy disputed all charges. In 2015, the company settled the lawsuits by agreeing to pay $25 million to the landowners. In December 2014, the company sold a large portion of its oil and gas assets in the Marcellus Formation and Utica Shale to Southwestern Energy for net proceeds of $4.975 billion. The transaction included approximately 413,000 net acres and 1,500 wells in northern West Virginia and southern Pennsylvania. Net production of the sold assets was 57,000 barrels of oil equivalent per day in December 2014.

In September 2015, the company announced layoffs of hundreds of people in Oklahoma City. In November 2015, the company was fined $1.4 million in Pennsylvania for a landslide caused by the company in 2011 that resulted in clogged waterways. By 2015, after the rise in hydraulic fracturing, there were more than 900 earthquakes in Oklahoma, compared to just a single earthquake in 2007. After the 2011 Oklahoma earthquake in Prague, Oklahoma, having suffered home damage and physical injury, a resident sued the company. The Sierra Club also filed a lawsuit against the company and Devon Energy over damages suffered in a magnitude 5.8, 2016 Oklahoma earthquake near Pawnee, which was tied for the largest such shock in the eastern United States in 70 years. A judge dismissed the lawsuit in April 2017.

In March 2016, a DOJ federal grand jury indicted Aubrey McClendon for allegedly rigging the bidding process for land leases between December 2007 and March 2012. McClendon was charged of orchestrating a conspiracy in which two oil and gas companies, not named in the indictment, colluded not to bid against each other for the purchase of land in northwestern Oklahoma. According to the indictment, the companies decided ahead of time who would win bids, with the winner then allocating an interest in the leases to the other company, eliminating open competitive bidding. The DOJ said this was the first case resulting from a continuing federal antitrust investigation into price fixing, bid rigging, and other anti-competitive conduct in the petroleum industry. The next day, McClendon died in a single-occupant single-vehicle crash when he drove his vehicle directly into a concrete bridge embankment in Oklahoma City. The charges were dropped by the DOJ as a result of the death.

In 2017, the company sold assets in the Haynesville shale for $465 million. In December 2017, the company agreed to pay $30 million to Pennsylvania landowners. In January 2018, the company laid off 400 employees. In the first quarter of 2018, the company sold assets in Oklahoma for $500 million. In February 2019, the company acquired Texas oil producer WildHorse Resource Development for $4 billion in cash and stock. In June 2020, the company filed for bankruptcy protection with $7 billion in debt. It emerged from bankruptcy protection in February 2021.

In April 2021, Doug Lawler resigned as CEO of the company and Mike Wichterich, Chair of the Board of Directors, was named interim-CEO. In November 2021, the company acquired Vine Energy, which operated in the Haynesville Shale. In March 2022, the company acquired Chief Oil & Gas for approximately $2.6 billion. The company also sold its assets in the Powder River Basin to Continental Resources for $450 million. In 2023, in three transactions, the company sold all of its assets in the Eagle Ford shale to Ineos, WildFire Energy (a subsidiary of Warburg Pincus and Kayne Anderson), and SilverBow Resources for a total of $3.5 billion.

In January 2024, a class action lawsuit was filed accusing the company, along with seven other US oil and gas producers, of engaging in an anti-competitive business practice in the form of an illegal price fixing scheme to constrain production of shale oil, allegedly leading to drivers in the US paying more for gasoline than they would have in a competitive market. In October 2024, the company acquired Southwestern Energy in a $7.4 billion all-stock deal and was rebranded as Expand Energy. In 2026, the company acquired Twin Eagle Holdings for $1.25 billion.

== Political involvement ==
In 2004, then CEO Aubrey McClendon contributed $450,000 to the campaign of Tom Corbett for attorney general of Pennsylvania. These funds were cited as the reason Corbett won the election, with a narrow margin. When Corbett eventually became governor of Pennsylvania, he was very supportive of the company's fracking activity in Pennsylvania, and Pennsylvania was the only state without a severance tax on drillers, despite the fact that the budget for education was being reduced.

In 2008, then CEO Aubrey McClendon formed American Clean Skies Foundation, a non-profit foundation focused on selling the virtues of natural gas. The foundation was funded by the company and by McClendon. The foundation was criticized for doing nothing but pushing Congress to pass policies that benefited the company and McClendon's business interests.
