= SandRidge Energy =

American energy company

SandRidge Energy, Inc.
- Company type: Public
- Traded as: NYSE: SD; Russell 2000 Index component
- Industry: Petroleum industry
- Founded: 2006; 20 years ago
- Founder: Tom L. Ward
- Headquarters: SandRidge Center; Oklahoma City, Oklahoma, United States
- Key people: Grayson Pranin (CEO); Salah Gamoudi (CFO); Jonathan Frates (chairman)
- Products: Petroleum; Natural gas Natural gas liquids
- Production output: 18.6 thousand barrels of oil equivalent (114,000 GJ) per day (2021)
- Revenue: ▲$168 million (2021)
- Net income: ▲$116 million (2021)
- Total assets: ▲$352 million (2021)
- Total equity: ▲$245 million (2021)
- Number of employees: 101 (2021)
- Website: sandridgeenergy.com

SandRidge Energy, Inc. is a company engaged in hydrocarbon exploration in the Mid-Continent region of the United States. It is organized in Delaware and headquartered in Oklahoma City, Oklahoma.

As of December 31, 2021, the company had 71.3 million barrels of oil equivalent (436,000,000 GJ) of oil equivalent net proved reserves, of which 11% was petroleum, 34% was natural gas liquids, and 55% was natural gas.

== History ==
SandRidge was founded in 2006 by Tom L. Ward upon the acquisition 46% of Riata Energy from Malone Mitchell III for $500 million. Ward previously co-founded Chesapeake Energy with Aubrey McClendon and was the chief operating officer of that company from 1989 until 1996.

On November 5, 2007, the company became a public company via an initial public offering.

In April 2012, the company acquired Dynamic Offshore Resources, LLC for $680 million in cash and approximately 74 million shares of stock.

On December 19, 2012, the company announced the sale of its Permian Basin properties to Sheridan Production Partners II, a privately held Houston-based oil and gas company, for $2.6 billion in cash. The transaction closed on January 1, 2013.

On June 19, 2013, citing "a need for new leadership", CEO Tom L. Ward was ousted by the board of the directors and James Bennett became President and CEO.

In 2014, the company sold its assets in the Gulf of Mexico for $750 million.

In October 2015, the company acquired Pinon Gathering Company, owner of 370 miles of gathering lines.

In November 2015, the company acquired 136,000 net acres in the Niobrara Formation of Colorado, after acquiring the assets of EE3, LLC, for $190 million in cash.

On January 6, 2016, the NYSE delisted the company.

On January 21, 2016, the company settled a dispute with Occidental Petroleum over a 30-year carbon dioxide gas treatment agreement. To exit the agreement, the company transferred all of the exploration and production midstream assets in the Pinon Field to Occidental Petroleum along with $11 million in cash.

On May 16, 2016, the company filed for bankruptcy, citing a high debt load and low commodity prices.

On October 4, 2016, the company emerged from bankruptcy reorganization, reducing debt by $3.7 billion. The company was re-listed on the New York Stock Exchange.

On November 15, 2017, the company announced it would buy Bonanza Creek for $746 million; however, on December 28, 2017, the company terminated the agreement, since investors, led by Carl Icahn, protested the acquisition. SandRidge agreed to reimburse Bonanza Creek $3.7 million for transaction-related expenses.

In February 2018, Midstates Petroleum offered to acquire Sandridge, which was rejected by the board.

On February 8, 2018, the company announced the termination of CEO James Bennett and the departure of CFO Julian Bott.

On February 26, 2018, the company announced 80 layoffs in Oklahoma City.

Effective January 29, 2019, Paul D. McKinney became president and chief executive officer of the company.

On In June 2019, the company announced layoffs of 10% of its staff.

In December 2019, John P. Suter replaced McKinney as president and chief executive officer.

In February 2020, the company announced plans to lay off more than half of its workforce in Oklahoma City.

In February 2021, the company sold its assets in the North Park Basin for $47 million.

== Environmental impact ==
Earthquakes, due to induced seismicity produced by injected wastes, had also substantially reduced in frequency and intensity, due to a Kansas Corporation Commission order mandating cutbacks in injection well volumes and pressures. SandRidge, which along with Chesapeake Energy was one of the two major producers in Southcentral Kansas, appealed the order.
