= Tom L. Ward =

American businessman

- Born: Seiling, Oklahoma
- Occupations: Chairman & CEO, Mach Resources Oil and Gas Entrepreneur
- Spouse: Schree Ward
- Children: 4

Tom L. Ward is a prominent Oklahoma City businessman and philanthropist. He is currently the chairman and CEO of Mach Resources, a publicly owned energy company in Oklahoma City, OK. He was the founder and former chairman and CEO of Tapstone Energy and SandRidge Energy, Inc. and is the former president, chief operating officer, and co-founder of Chesapeake Energy.

After growing SandRidge into a $10 billion company, Ward and SandRidge parted ways in 2013. The decision to move on from Ward was made without cause, along with two separate board investigations concluding nothing improper and no wrongdoings occurred during his tenure as chairman and CEO.

Ward, who Bloomberg coined "a natural gas icon" in 2017, has founded and led several successful oil and gas companies throughout his career.

Ward is also owner of TLW Trading, L.L.C., Heritage Feeders, L.P., and TLW Land and Cattle. TLW Trading, L.L.C. invests both financially and physically in commodities, focusing primarily on energy, specifically on North American natural gas markets. Heritage Feeders is ranked within the top 10 cattle feeders in the United States.

== Early life ==
Ward grew up in Seiling, Oklahoma, where he was raised and attended high school. In high school, Ward competed in football, basketball, baseball, and track. During his senior year, he worked with his uncle in local oil fields. Before leaving for college, Ward met his future wife, Schree.

== Education ==
Ward graduated from the University of Oklahoma in 1981 with a BBA in Petroleum Land Management.

== Philanthropy and community involvement ==
Ward co-founded White Fields in 2000 and serves as the chairman of the board. White Fields' mission is to provide a continuum model of care offering a long-term home for abused and neglected boys. They strive to meet the physical, emotional, educational, and spiritual needs of these boys by giving them a long-term home, counseling, and guidance. At White Fields, the boys can stay as long as they need to in order to heal, unlike many other short-term arrangements. In 2016, the Oklahoma Department of Human Services partnered with Ward, through White Fields Inc., and Eckerd Kids to provide innovative software that uses predictive analytics to prevent childhood tragedies.

In 2002, the Tom L. and Sch'ree Ward Fieldhouse at Anderson University was named after Ward and his wife for their gift that completed the construction of the Kardatzke Wellness Center in Anderson, Indiana. The couple also created a scholarship program for young people who are members of Crossings Community Church in Oklahoma City to attend Anderson University, a private Christian institution, for tuition comparable to an Oklahoma state school.

In 2005, Ward provided a free campus for SeeWorth Academy with an ideal location, where 400 students could gain a balanced curriculum without outside distractions and influences."

In 2014, Ward invested $17 million into the 96-year-old vacant Mideke building in Bricktown, in downtown Oklahoma City, to reestablish it as Tapstone's headquarters. Renovations include the east alley wall of the warehouse being modified with a "transparent glass façade," and a partial revamp of the interior by integrating existing historical architectural elements into the new design. Additional renovations include a 3,600-square-foot expansion for an All About Chai Coffee and Tea.

Ward was highly active in sponsoring major downtown activities in December 2014, such as the SandRidge Tree Lighting Festival and SandRidge Santa Run. Ward and SandRidge also worked intently with Alva's minimum security Bill Johnson Correctional Center located in Oklahoma. "Through the partnership, rehabilitation, non-violent inmates earn the opportunity to return back to the workplace."

Ward was a member of the Professional Basketball Club LLC, which owns the NBA's Oklahoma City Thunder, until he sold his interest to George Kaiser in April 2014.

Ward is a committed member of several education-affiliated organizations. He is a former board of trustees member for Anderson University in Indiana, is a member of the Economic Advisory Council of the Federal Reserve Bank of Kansas City, and participates on the board of visitors for the OU Health Sciences Center. He is also on the board of the department of medicine, the board of trustees for The World Golf Foundation, and a member of The First Tee, which is an organization developed to help "shape the lives of kids and teens from all walks of life by introducing them to values inherent in the game of golf." Ward also contributes as a member of the Nopetro board of directors.

Ward has provided substantial scholarship money to Oklahoma colleges and universities to help students achieve their higher education goals and find work in the state after college. Ward played a major role in revitalizing downtown's Central Business District. Ward oversaw the renovation of the former Kerr-McGee Tower into SandRidge's corporate headquarters, which is now known as SandRidge Commons. Ward is notable in restoring rundown buildings, such as Oklahoma City's historical Braniff Building, by adding retail, contemporary office space, and restaurants. Ward also directed 120 Kerr from a "dilapidated parking structure," to a modern office building.

Ward is also the chairman of the Tom L. Ward Family Foundation, which supports several nonprofits, including Positive Tomorrows and Oklahomans for Criminal Justice Reform.

== Honors and awards ==
Ward was inducted into the Oklahoma Heritage Foundation's Hall of Fame in 2012 and was one out of four honorees chosen for the Neal Horton Award at the 2014 Dean A. McGee Awards Ceremony for his role in the revitalization of downtown's Central Business District. In April 2006, Ward was chosen as a Friend of Children Honoree by the Oklahoma Institute for Child Advocacy. Ward was honored by Big Brothers Big Sisters with the Judge William R. Saied Founder's Award for his advancement of mentoring in Oklahoma City. In 2008, The National Philanthropy Day Past Award was also presented to Ward for being an Outstanding Philanthropist.
