= Oklahoma City Thunder =

National Basketball Association team in Oklahoma City

- 2026–27 Oklahoma City Thunder season
- Conference: Western
- Division: Northwest
- Founded: 1967
- History: Seattle SuperSonics; 1967–2008; Oklahoma City Thunder; 2008–present
- Arena: Paycom Center
- Location: Oklahoma City, Oklahoma
- Team colors: Thunder blue, sunset, yellow, dark blue
- Main sponsor: Love's
- General manager: Sam Presti
- Head coach: Mark Daigneault
- Ownership: Professional Basketball Club LLC (Clay Bennett, Chairman)
- Affiliation: Oklahoma City Blue
- Championships: 2 (1979, 2025)
- Conference titles: 5 (1978, 1979, 1996, 2012, 2025)
- Division titles: 14 (1979, 1994, 1996, 1997, 1998, 2005, 2011, 2012, 2013, 2014, 2016, 2024, 2025, 2026)
- Retired numbers: 7 (1, 4, 10, 19, 24, 32, 43)
- Website: nba.com/thunder
Association	Icon	Statement

The Oklahoma City Thunder are an American professional basketball team based in Oklahoma City. The Thunder compete in the National Basketball Association (NBA) as a member of the Northwest Division of the Western Conference. The team plays its home games at Paycom Center.

The Thunder's NBA G League affiliate is the Oklahoma City Blue, which it owns. The Thunder are the only team in the major professional North American sports leagues based in the state of Oklahoma. Oklahoma City previously hosted the New Orleans Hornets for two seasons following devastation caused by Hurricane Katrina in New Orleans.

The Thunder were originally established as the Seattle SuperSonics, an expansion team that joined the NBA for the 1967–68 season. The SuperSonics moved from Seattle to Oklahoma City in July 2008, after a settlement was reached between the ownership group led by Clay Bennett and lawmakers in Seattle following a lawsuit. In Seattle, the SuperSonics qualified for the NBA playoffs 22 times, won their division six times, advanced to three NBA Finals, and won the 1979 NBA championship.

In Oklahoma City, the Thunder qualified for their first playoff berth during the 2009–10 season. They won their first division title as the Thunder in the 2010–11 season and their first Western Conference championship as the Thunder in the 2011–12 season, appearing in the NBA Finals for the fourth time in franchise history and first time since 1996, when the team was based in Seattle. The Thunder lost the series to the Miami Heat, 4–1. They returned to the NBA Finals in 2025 and defeated the Indiana Pacers in seven games to win their first NBA championship since moving to Oklahoma City. (Note: Attributed to multiple references:)

== History ==
=== 1967–2008: Seattle SuperSonics ===
The Thunder's previous incarnation, the Seattle SuperSonics, were formed in 1967. In their 41 seasons in Seattle, the SuperSonics compiled a 1,745–1,585 (.524) win–loss record in the regular season and went 107–110 (.493) in the playoffs. The franchise's titles include three Western Conference championships (1978, 1979 and 1996) and one NBA title in 1979. In their last season, they drafted franchise player Kevin Durant, setting up the Thunder for success.

=== 2008–2016: Durant and Westbrook era ===
==== 2008–2009: Move to Oklahoma City and inaugural season ====
In 2006, former Starbucks CEO Howard Schultz sold the SuperSonics and its Women's National Basketball Association (WNBA) sister franchise, the Seattle Storm, for $350 million to the Professional Basketball Club LLC, a group of Oklahoma City investors led by Clay Bennett. The sale of the SuperSonics and Storm was approved by NBA owners the following October. In 2007, Bennett announced that the franchise would move to Oklahoma City as soon as the lease with KeyArena expired.

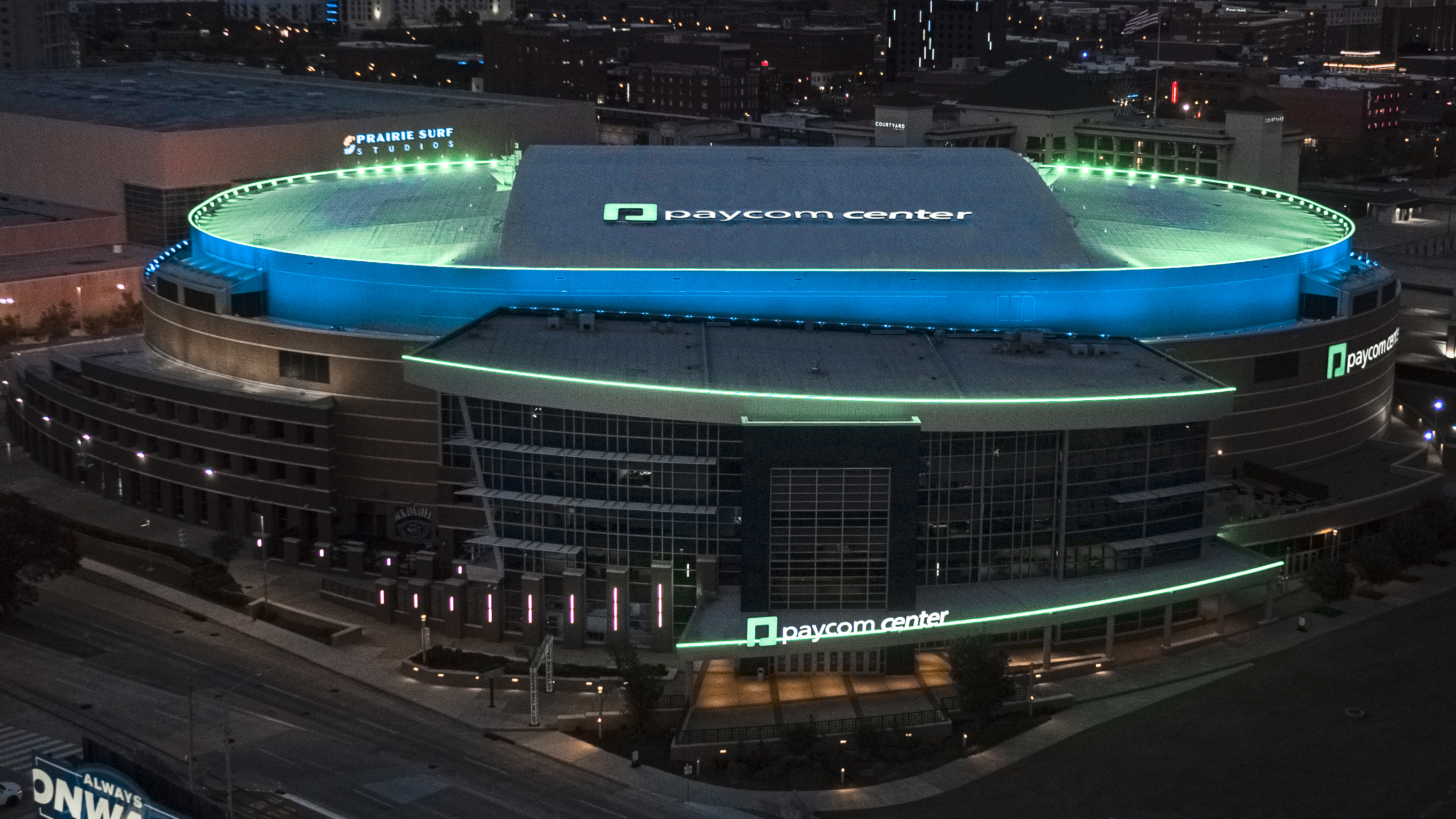
Paycom Center began hosting the Oklahoma City Thunder in 2008, then known as the Ford Center.

In June 2008, a lawsuit brought by the city of Seattle against Bennett due to his attempts to break the final two years of the Sonics' lease at KeyArena went to federal court. Nearly a month later, the two sides reached a settlement agreement. The terms awarded the city $45 million to get out of the remaining lease at KeyArena, and would have provided an additional $30 million payment to Seattle in 2013 if certain conditions had been met. The owners agreed to leave the SuperSonics name, logo, colors, banners, trophies, and records in Seattle for a possible future NBA franchise; however, the items would remain the property of the Oklahoma City team along with other "assets", including championship banners and trophies until a new Seattle team arrives. On September 3, 2008, the team name, logo and colors for the Oklahoma City franchise were revealed to the public. The name "Thunder" was chosen in reference to Oklahoma's location in Tornado Alley and Oklahoma City as the home of the U.S. Army's 45th Infantry Division, the Thunderbirds. The SuperSonics' final NBA draft was in 2008, and they used the fourth overall pick to select Russell Westbrook, a young point guard from UCLA, who would become the team's franchise player.

The Thunder participated in the Orlando Pro Summer League featuring their second-year players, potential free agents and rookies. The players wore generic black and white jerseys reading "OKC-NBA" against an outline of a basketball. The Thunder's temporary practice facility was the Sawyer Center at Southern Nazarene University, which had been used by the New Orleans Hornets when they moved to Oklahoma City after Hurricane Katrina.

The Thunder played several preseason games before the 2008–09 regular season, but only one of those games was in Oklahoma City. The Thunder made their first appearance in Billings, Montana on October 8, 2008, in an 88–82 preseason loss against the Minnesota Timberwolves. The Thunder played their first Ford Center game on October 14 against the Los Angeles Clippers.

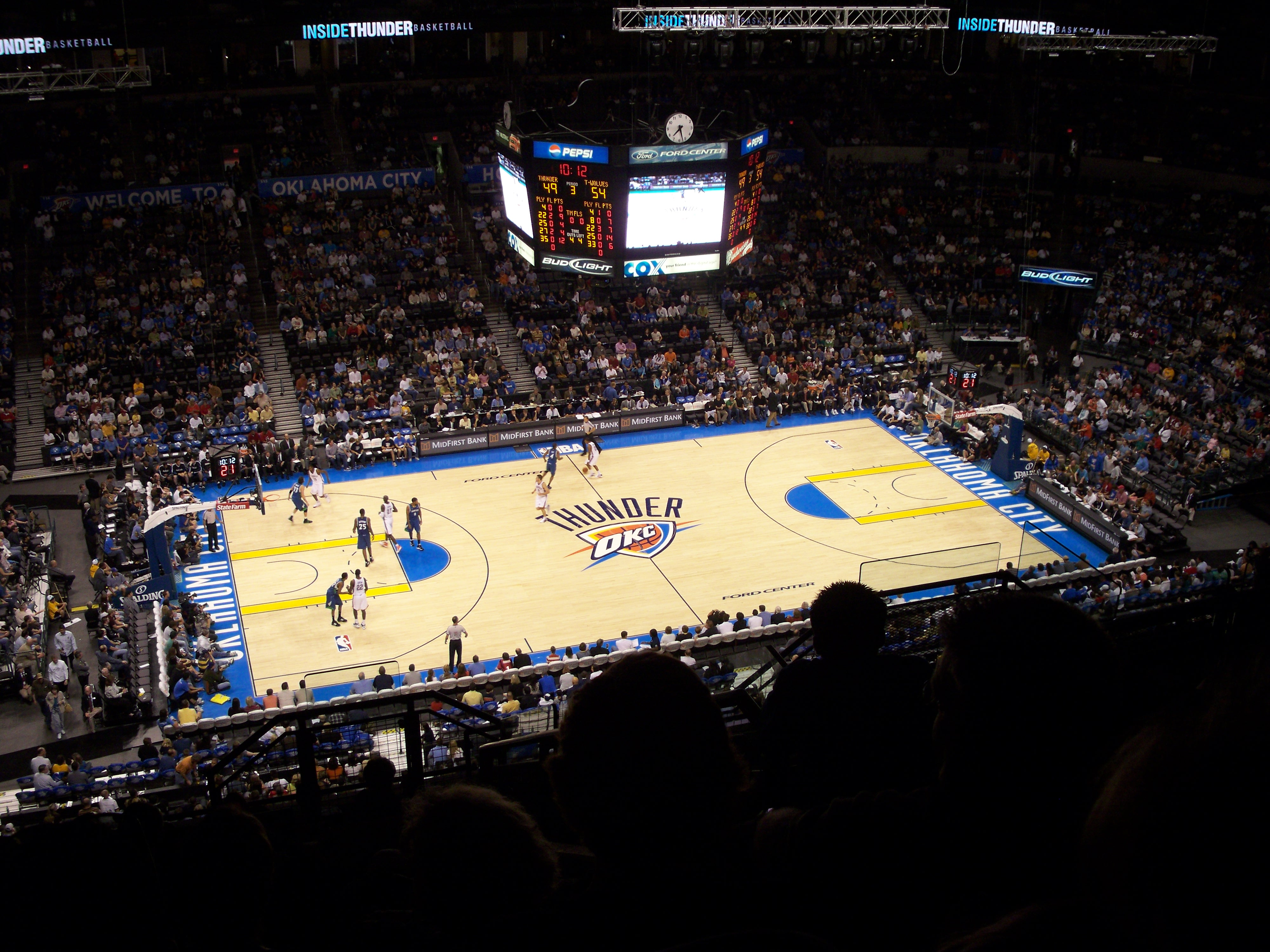
Oklahoma City defeated Minnesota on November 2, 2008, for their first win.

In their regular season home opener, the Thunder faced (and lost to) the Milwaukee Bucks. Earl Watson scored the first points of the season with a layup. Three nights later on November 2, the Thunder won their first game by defeating the Timberwolves, improving their record to 1–3. The team then went on a 10-game losing streak before deciding on November 22 to fire head coach P. J. Carlesimo and assistant Paul Westhead. Assistant coach Scott Brooks then took over on an interim basis. Oklahoma City lost its next four games to tie the franchise losing streak of 14 set in Seattle the previous season. But the team managed to prevent history by winning their next game on the road against the Memphis Grizzlies.

As the season continued, the Thunder began to improve. After starting 3–29, the Thunder finished the regular season 20–30 for the remaining fifty games. Not only were they winning more often, they played much more competitively than in the first part of the season. The team brought their record to 23–59 and improved upon their record of 20–62 from the team's final season in Seattle. The late-season successes of the Thunder contributed to the signing of Scott Brooks as the team's official head coach.

After moving to Oklahoma City from Seattle, the team's operating situation improved markedly. In December 2008, Forbes magazine estimated the team's franchise value at $300 million—a 12 percent increase from the previous year's $268 million, when the club was located in Seattle. Forbes also noted an increase in percentage of available tickets sold, from 78 percent in the team's last season in Seattle to 100 percent in 2008–09.

==== 2009–2012: Rise to contention and first Finals appearance ====
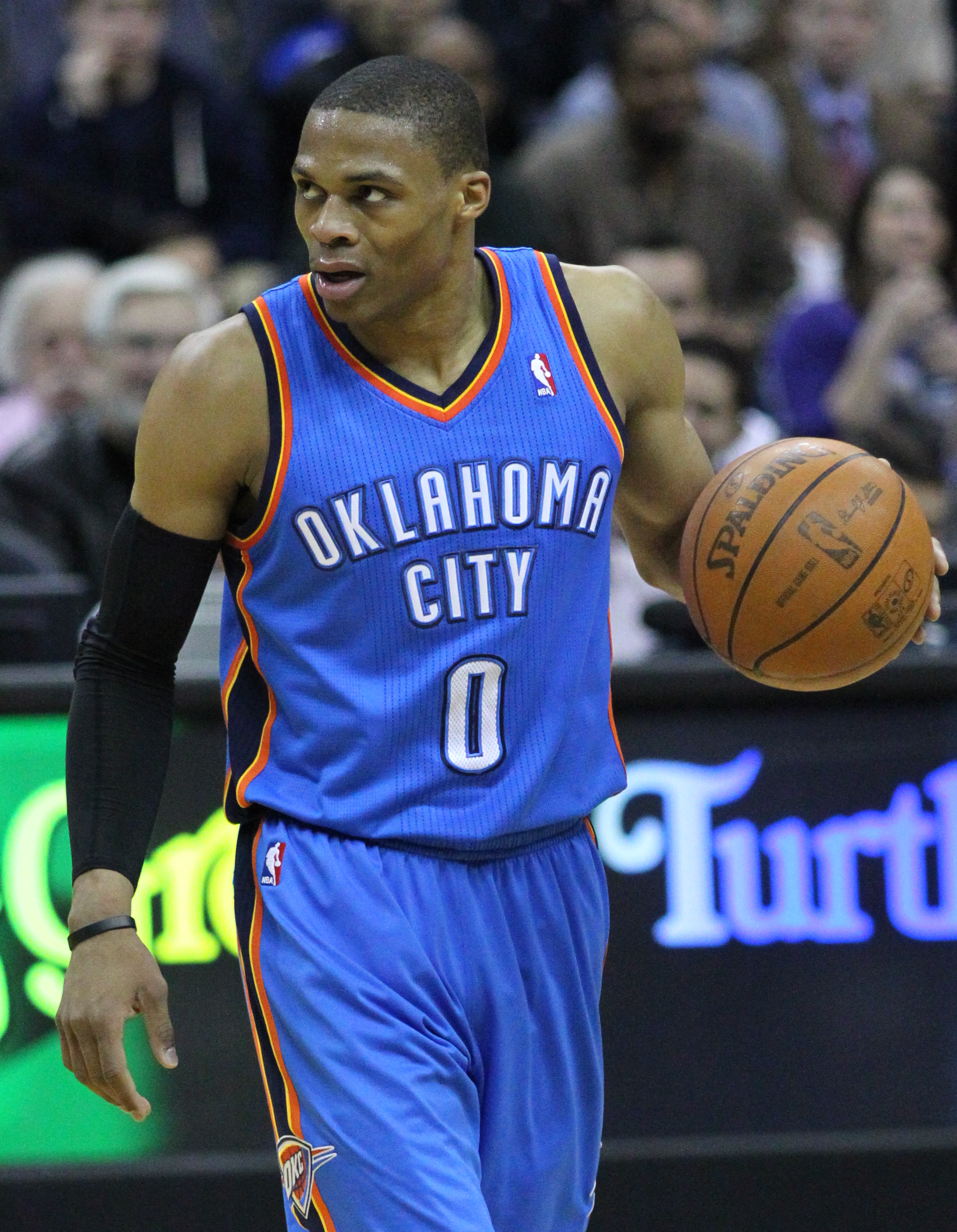
Russell Westbrook

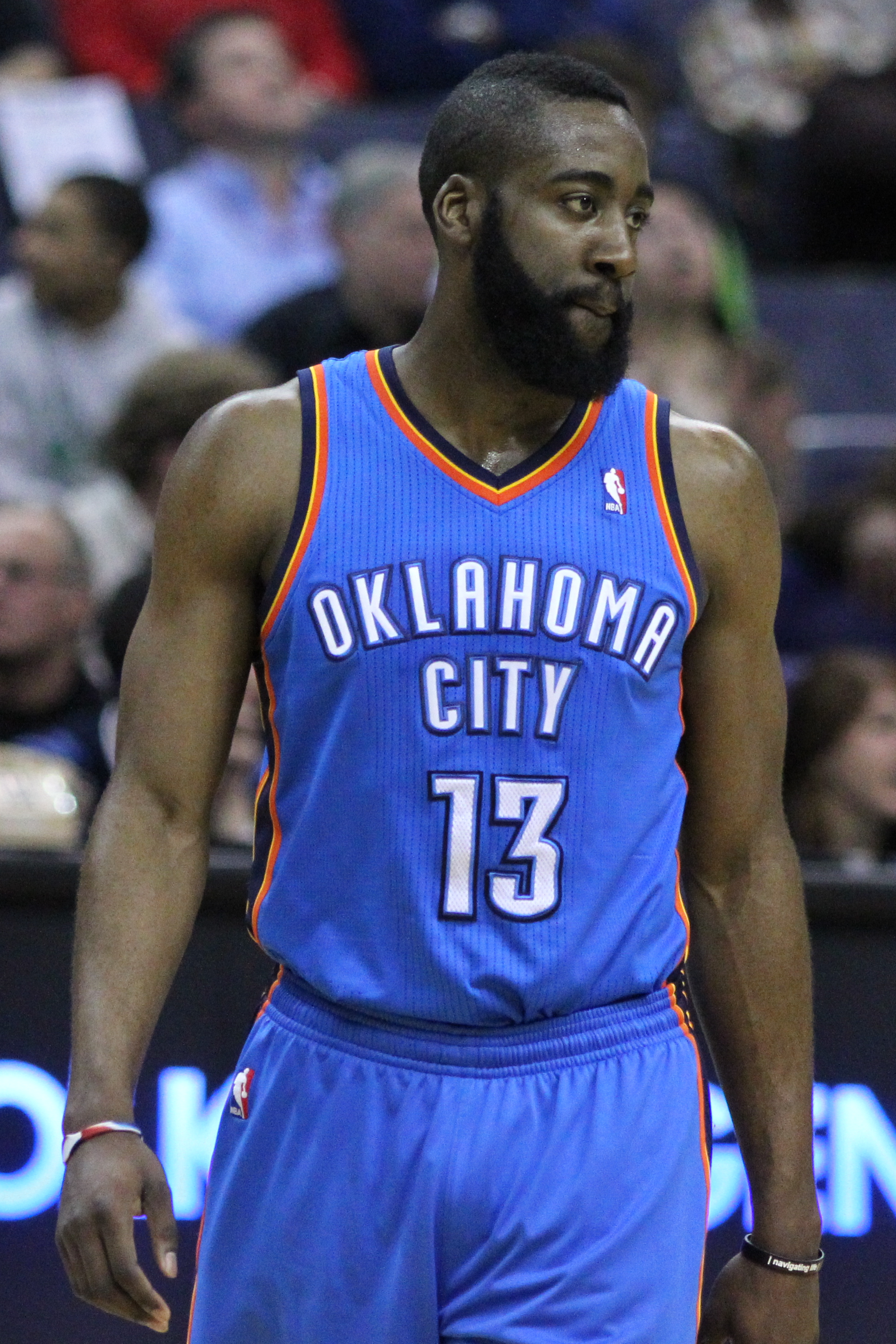
James Harden

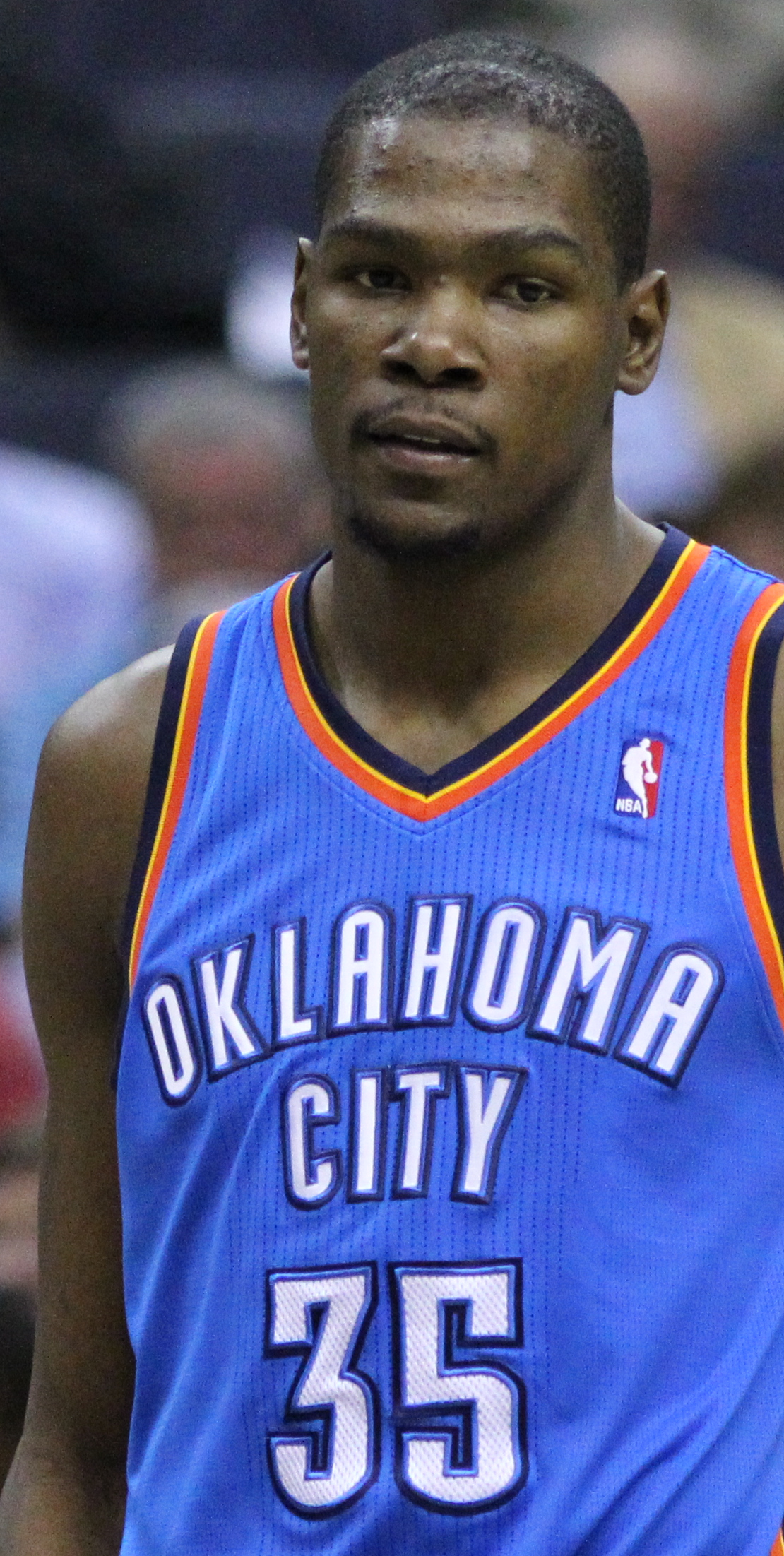
Kevin Durant

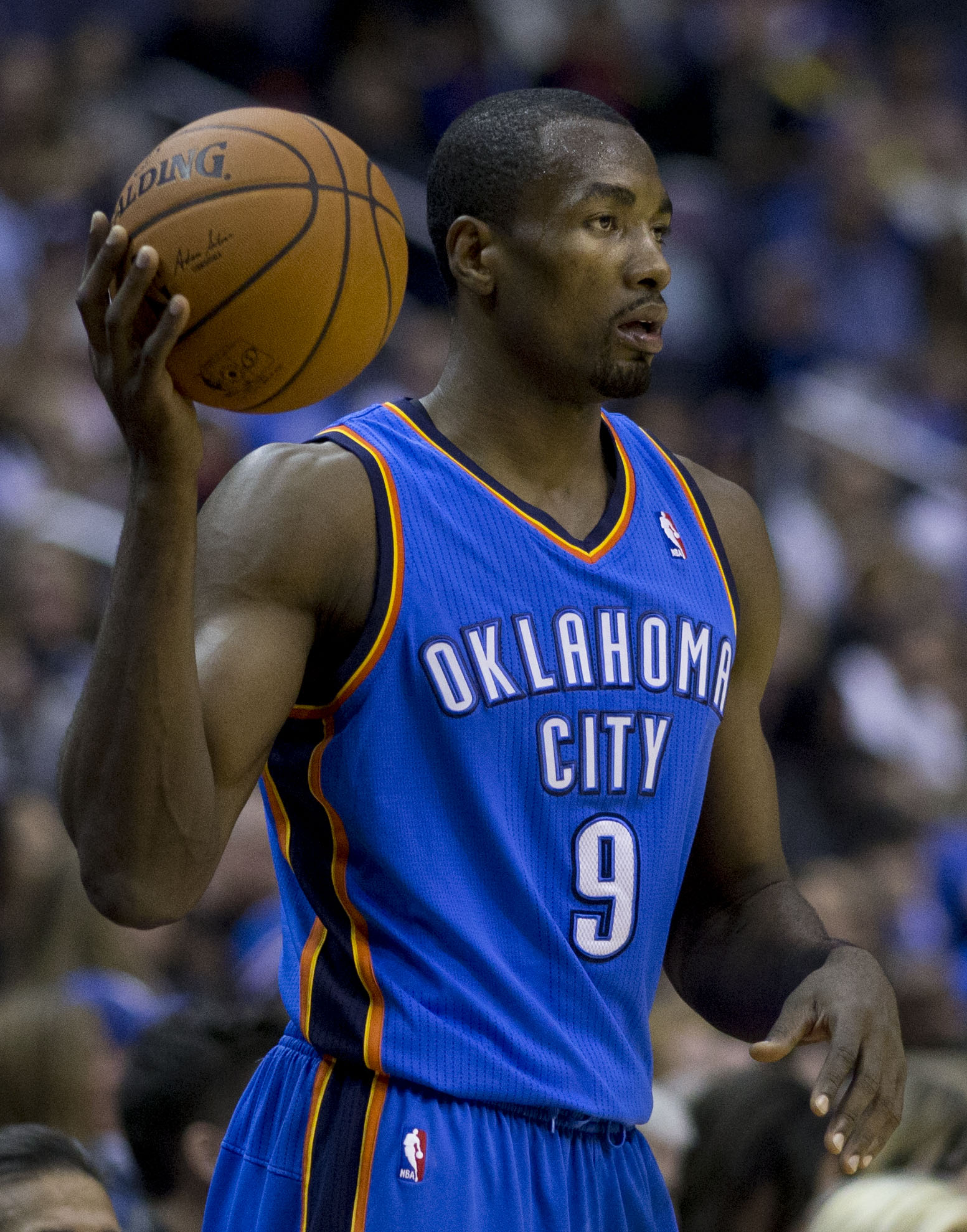
Serge Ibaka

Westbrook, Harden, Durant and Ibaka were the main players in Thunder's revived contention for an NBA title

After an inaugural season filled with many adjustments, the Thunder hoped to improve during their second season in Oklahoma City. Oklahoma City did not make any major moves in the off-season, other than drafting James Harden from Arizona State University with the third overall pick in the NBA draft. The Thunder selected Rodrigue Beaubois with the 25th pick in the 2009 draft before immediately trading him to the Dallas Mavericks for the 24th pick, center Byron Mullens from Ohio State University. The team then added veteran center Etan Thomas and guard Kevin Ollie. The last major change to their roster occurred on December 22, 2009, when the team traded for Eric Maynor from the Utah Jazz. Maynor immediately supplanted Ollie as the backup point guard.

From the outset the young team looked determined and cohesive. The increasing leadership of Kevin Durant, along with the growing experience of the Thunder's younger players, including future MVPs Westbrook and Harden, were signs of the Thunder's improvement. The 2009–10 season included several victories over the NBA's elite teams, including a 28-point win over the Eastern Conference champion Orlando Magic and a 16-point win over the reigning NBA champion, the Los Angeles Lakers. Road victories over the San Antonio Spurs, Utah Jazz, Miami Heat, Boston Celtics and Dallas Mavericks further enhanced their reputation. Though they hovered around .500 for the first half of the season, they went on a 9-game winning streak that sent them into serious playoff contention. Kevin Durant became the youngest player in league history to win the scoring title, averaging 30.1 points per game while playing in all 82 games.

The Thunder finished 50–32, more than doubling their win total from the previous season. The 50–32 record tied the 2008 Denver Nuggets for the most wins by an 8th seed in the modern playoffs era. The Oklahoma City Thunder also had the same record as the Boston Celtics in this season. They finished fourth in the Northwest Division and eighth in the Western Conference playoff standings, and earned a spot in the 2010 NBA playoffs. On April 22, the team secured their first playoff win in Oklahoma City when they defeated the defending-champion Los Angeles Lakers 101–96. This was also the Thunder's first playoff win at the Ford Center. The Thunder would go on to tie the series at two games each, but the Lakers won the last two games in the series to win it 4–2.

Oklahoma City ranked twelfth in overall attendance in the NBA, and seventh in percentage of available seats occupied (98.9 percent, including 28 sellouts in 41 home games). The team's operating situation also continued to improve in 2009–10. Forbes magazine estimated the team's franchise value at $310 million (an increase of $10 million over the prior year) with an estimated operating profit of $12.7 million (the first operating profit in years for the franchise).

Financially, the Thunder organization continued to build on its profitable move from Seattle to Oklahoma City. In January 2011, Forbes magazine estimated the franchise's worth at $329 million, up six percent from 2009 to 2010 and ranking No. 18 in the NBA. The magazine also estimated the franchise's revenue at $118 million and operating profit at $22.6 million—up 6.3 percent and 78 percent, respectively, from the previous year. The Thunder finished the 2010–2011 season with a 55–27 record, a five-win increase from their breakout season the previous year. The team also captured their first division title since moving to Oklahoma City, and seventh in franchise history.

In the wake of a fourth-seed versus fifth-seed match-up against the Denver Nuggets, Kevin Durant scored 41 points in game 1 to set a new career playoff high. In the final game of the series, he again scored 41 and forward Serge Ibaka nearly tied the record for most blocks in a playoff game (10, set by Mark Eaton, Hakeem Olajuwon and Andrew Bynum) with nine blocks. The Thunder won the series four games to one and were set to face off against the Memphis Grizzlies who achieved an eight-seed upset over the San Antonio Spurs just days before. The Thunder advanced to the Western Conference finals with a seven-game series triumph over the Grizzlies. Durant was again the star, scoring 39 points in the clinching game 7, while Russell Westbrook also had a triple-double. Despite hard-fought battles with the eventual NBA champs, the Thunder fell to the Dallas Mavericks 4–1 in the conference finals. The Thunder had a chance to tie the series in game 4, but they were unable to hold a 15-point lead with five minutes remaining in the fourth quarter. They ended up losing in overtime, 112–105.

During the extended lockout, Thunder players played in exhibition games and even local pickup games to stay in shape. When the abbreviated training camp began, Oklahoma City started with an intact roster and all players, except for Russell Westbrook. In addition, Kendrick Perkins lost more than 30 pounds during the lockout. The Thunder made their two preseason appearances, after the lockout, against the Dallas Mavericks, winning both games. They won their first regular season game against Orlando at home and went on a five-game winning streak. Kevin Durant became the sixth player to score 30 or more points in four consecutive games at the start of a season. In addition, the Thunder was the first to sweep their back-to-back-to-back games, winning a home-and-home series with the Houston Rockets, then routing the San Antonio Spurs. Thunder players Durant, Westbrook, Harden, Perkins and Ibaka made it onto the 2012 All-Star ballots. After the Thunder's win over the Utah Jazz on February 11, 2012, Scott Brooks was named as the head coach for the Western Conference All-Star squad for the NBA All-Star Game.

In the 2012 NBA playoffs, the Thunder swept the defending champion Dallas Mavericks in the first round to advance and face off against their first-round foes from 2010, the Los Angeles Lakers. They defeated the Lakers in five games and advanced to play the San Antonio Spurs in the conference finals. The Thunder lost the first two games against the Spurs but won the next three including a game 5 road win, to take a commanding 3–2 game lead in the series. In game 6, the Thunder defeated the Spurs 107–99 and advanced to the 2012 NBA Finals. Durant led the way with 34 points, playing all of regulation time in the game. In the 2012 NBA Finals against the Miami Heat, the Thunder won the first game at home but then lost four in a row losing the series in five games.

==== 2012–2016: Post-Finals appearance years and Harden's departure ====
===== 2012–2013 =====
In the 2012 NBA draft, the Thunder selected Baylor University forward Perry Jones III with the 28th overall pick. The Thunder also signed free agents Hasheem Thabeet and Daniel Orton, and signed guards Andy Rautins and DeAndre Liggins. They re-signed forward Serge Ibaka to a four-year, $48 million extension. After failing to sign James Harden to an extension that was reportedly worth four years and $52 million, the team decided to trade Harden rather than having to pay the luxury tax penalty. On October 27, 2012, the Thunder traded Harden along with center Cole Aldrich and forwards Daequan Cook and Lazar Hayward to the Houston Rockets for Kevin Martin, Jeremy Lamb, first-round draft picks from Toronto and Dallas, and one second-round draft pick. Martin took over Harden's sixth-man role for the season. The Thunder finished with a 60–22 regular season, taking both the Northwest division title and top seed of the Western Conference. In the first round of the playoffs, they faced the 8th-seeded Houston Rockets and former Thunder star James Harden. In game two of the series, Russell Westbrook collided with Rockets point guard Patrick Beverley, and missed the rest of the playoffs after having knee surgery. Without the team's second-leading scorer, the Thunder, who had a 3–0 lead, lost the next two games to bring the series to 3–2. In game 6, the Thunder defeated the Rockets to meet the Memphis Grizzlies in the second round, creating a rematch of the 2011 second round. The Thunder lost the series 4–1, losing four straight games after winning game 1 at home.

===== 2013–2014 =====
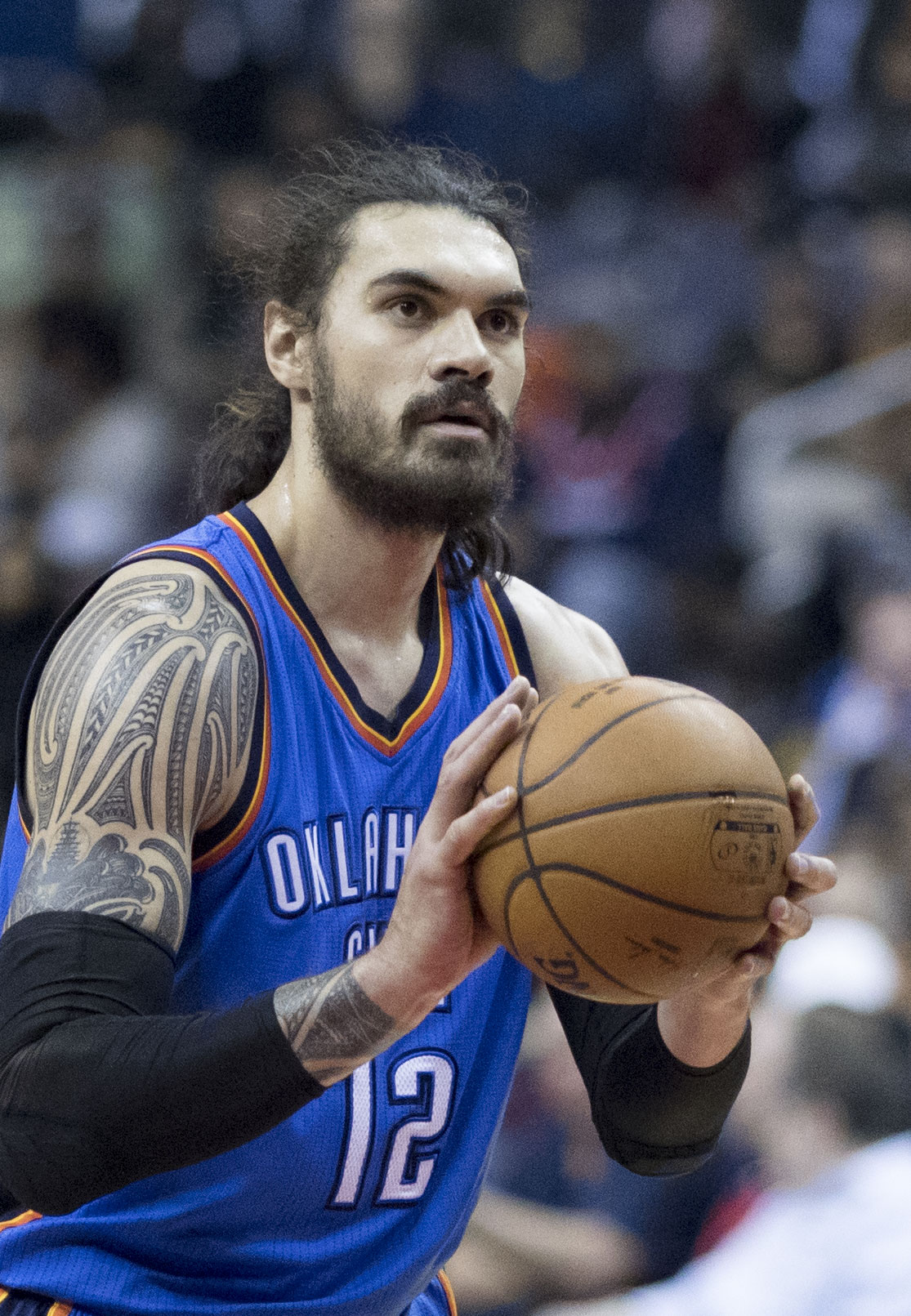
The Thunder selected Steven Adams as the 12th pick in the 2013 NBA draft.

In the 2013 NBA draft, the Thunder selected 12th pick Steven Adams, traded for the 26th pick André Roberson, and selected 47th pick Grant Jerrett. Kevin Martin was not re-signed, and he opted to join the Timberwolves, while the team were only able to add free agent Ryan Gomes and re-sign Derek Fisher to conclude their off-season movements. The team finished second in the Western conference with a 59–23 record. They met the Memphis Grizzlies for the third time in the playoffs, which set a record for most consecutive overtimes in a playoff series, with four. Oklahoma City prevailed in seven games to play the Los Angeles Clippers in the semifinals, whom they defeated in six games. Their final playoff opponent, in the conference finals, was the San Antonio Spurs in a rematch of the 2012 conference finals, this time with the Spurs winning, 4–2.

===== 2014–2016 =====
With the 21st and 29th picks in the 2014 NBA draft, the Thunder selected Mitch McGary from Michigan and Josh Huestis from Stanford. "He brings energy, passion, and great basketball IQ and toughness what we value" said Presti on drafting McGary. Oklahoma City also signed Semaj Christon after acquiring his draft rights from the Charlotte Hornets. On July 3, the Thunder signed Sebastian Telfair. But they lost shooting guard Thabo Sefolosha as his contract expired and he agreed to a three-year, $12 million contract with the Atlanta Hawks. Several weeks before the season started, the Thunder suffered a setback as Durant was diagnosed with a Jones fracture in his right foot and missed the first 17 games of the season. During the opening game against the Portland Trail Blazers, Westbrook scored 38 points, but found himself sidelined due to a small fracture in his right hand. He missed 16 games, during which Oklahoma City went 4–12. During the middle of the season Westbrook and Durant both came back, and similarly suffered more injuries. Durant was ruled out of the rest of the season in March, deciding to have foot surgery. Westbrook also had to undergo surgery in early March, to repair a fracture in the zygomatic arch bone of his right cheek. Several days later he returned and recorded several triple-doubles on his way to Western Conference Player of the Month honors from February to April. He also won the 2014–2015 NBA scoring title. However, despite the effort, the Thunder missed the playoffs due to a tiebreaker with the New Orleans Pelicans, and Westbrook fell short of the MVP award, finishing fourth in voting. They finished with a 45–37 record. On April 22, 2015, Scott Brooks was fired as the Thunder head coach. Billy Donovan was hired on April 30, 2015. This was Donovan's first major NBA coaching job, after he initially accepted and then left the Orlando Magic job in 2007. With the 14th and the 48th picks in the 2015 NBA draft, the Thunder selected Cameron Payne from Murray State and Dakari Johnson from Kentucky. With Billy Donovan as the team's head coach the Thunder won the Northwest Division and clinched the third seed in the Western Conference. The team reached the conference finals for the fourth time in a span of six seasons, but was eliminated by the Golden State Warriors in seven games, after blowing a 3–1 series lead.

=== 2016–2019: Russell Westbrook era ===
==== 2016–2017: Durant's departure and Westbrook's MVP season ====
After much speculation on the future of free agent superstar Kevin Durant, he announced on July 4, 2016, that he was joining the Warriors. The move to join the 73-win team from last season was heavily criticized by the public and sports media, with many comparing the move to LeBron James' 2010 off-season departure from Cleveland to the Miami Heat. On July 7, Durant was officially introduced by the Warriors organization and signed a two-year, $54.3 million contract, with a player option after the first year.

On August 4, 2016, Westbrook agreed to a three-year extension to remain with the Thunder. With an average of 31.6 points, 10.4 assists and 10.7 rebounds, Westbrook became the second player in NBA history, after Oscar Robertson, to average a triple-double for an entire NBA regular season. On April 2, 2017, Westbrook tied Oscar Robertson's record for most triple-doubles in an NBA season (41); he broke the record on April 9 against the Denver Nuggets, marking his 42nd triple-double of the season. Westbrook, in that game, also hit the game-winning buzzer beater from 36 feet, ending the Nuggets' playoffs hopes and securing the Thunder's third-seed matchup with the Houston Rockets in the NBA playoffs. Oklahoma City lost the playoff series in the first round to the Rockets 4–1. Despite the team's loss, Westbrook averaged a +14 while on the court and a triple-double during the series and was named league MVP after the season.

==== 2017–2019: Arrival of Paul George ====
In the 2017 NBA draft, the Thunder selected guard Terrance Ferguson with the 21st pick, and signed him to a four-year rookie-scale contract.

To further bolster the roster and improve Westbrook's supporting cast, the Thunder's front office made a series of aggressive moves to reshape the team. On July 6, 2017, the Thunder acquired four-time All-Star forward Paul George in a trade with the Indiana Pacers in exchange for guard Victor Oladipo and forward Domantas Sabonis. The team then signed veteran point guard Raymond Felton and sharp-shooting power forward Patrick Patterson in free agency on July 10. Finally, on September 25, the Thunder acquired ten-time All-Star forward Carmelo Anthony from the New York Knicks in exchange for center Enes Kanter, forward Doug McDermott, and a 2018 second-round draft pick they had previously acquired from the Chicago Bulls in the Cameron Payne trade. On September 29, 2017, the Thunder signed its star point guard Russell Westbrook to a five-year extension. The Thunder finished the 2017–18 season with a 48–34 record and lost to the Utah Jazz 4–2 in the first round of the playoffs.

In the 2018 NBA draft, the Thunder selected guard Devon Hall with the 53rd pick and forward Kevin Hervey with the 57th pick. Hall did not sign with the Thunder, instead signing with the Cairns Taipans of the Australian National Basketball League. Hervey signed with the Thunder's NBA G League affiliate, Oklahoma City Blue. Additionally, the Thunder traded a 2019 second-round pick to acquire Hamidou Diallo, who had been selected by the Brooklyn Nets with the 45th pick. Diallo signed a three-year contract with the Thunder.

On July 6, 2018, Paul George re-signed with the Thunder. In July 2018, the Thunder traded forward Carmelo Anthony and a 2022 protected first-round pick to the Atlanta Hawks in a three-way trade. In the trade, the Thunder acquired guard Dennis Schröder from the Hawks and forward Timothé Luwawu-Cabarrot from the Philadelphia 76ers. The Thunder also acquired guard Deonte Burton, signing him to a two-way contract with the Oklahoma City Blue. Additionally, the Thunder acquired center Nerlens Noel in free agency, and traded for Abdel Nader from the Boston Celtics.

=== 2019–present: Shai Gilgeous-Alexander era ===
==== 2019–2020: Chris Paul year ====
General manager Sam Presti traded Paul George to the Los Angeles Clippers on July 10, 2019. In return, they received Danilo Gallinari, Shai Gilgeous-Alexander, and a record collection of future first-round draft picks. It was reported after the trade was announced that George had privately requested the trade to the Clippers, whose superstar free agent Kawhi Leonard had asked him to team up. They also traded forward Jerami Grant to the Denver Nuggets for a 2020 protected first-round pick.

After the George trade, general manager Presti sensed that the team could not seriously contend with Westbrook as the lone star. On July 16, the Thunder traded Westbrook to the Houston Rockets for Chris Paul, two future first-round draft picks, and the rights to two future pick swaps with the Rockets.

Paul made the 2020 NBA All-Star Game as a reserve, making it his 10th selection, and his first since 2015–16.

After the suspension of the 2019–20 NBA season, the Thunder were one of the 22 teams invited to the NBA Bubble to participate in the final eight games of the regular season. The Thunder were eliminated in 7 games vs Paul's former team, the Houston Rockets.

==== 2020–2023: Young core rebuild ====
After the season, Billy Donovan's contract was not renewed, and both sides agreed to part ways. On November 11, 2020, Mark Daigneault was promoted from assistant coach to head coach.

Before the 2020–21 NBA season, Chris Paul was traded to the Phoenix Suns for Kelly Oubre Jr., Ricky Rubio, two additional players and a 2022 first-round draft pick. Oubre, Rubio and several Thunder veterans from the 2019–20 season, such as Steven Adams, Dennis Schröder and Danilo Gallinari, were traded away in the next several days as well, with the Thunder receiving draft picks as part of compensation in most of those transactions. Overall, the team executed 14 trades after the end of the 2019–20 season and before the 2021 trade deadline.

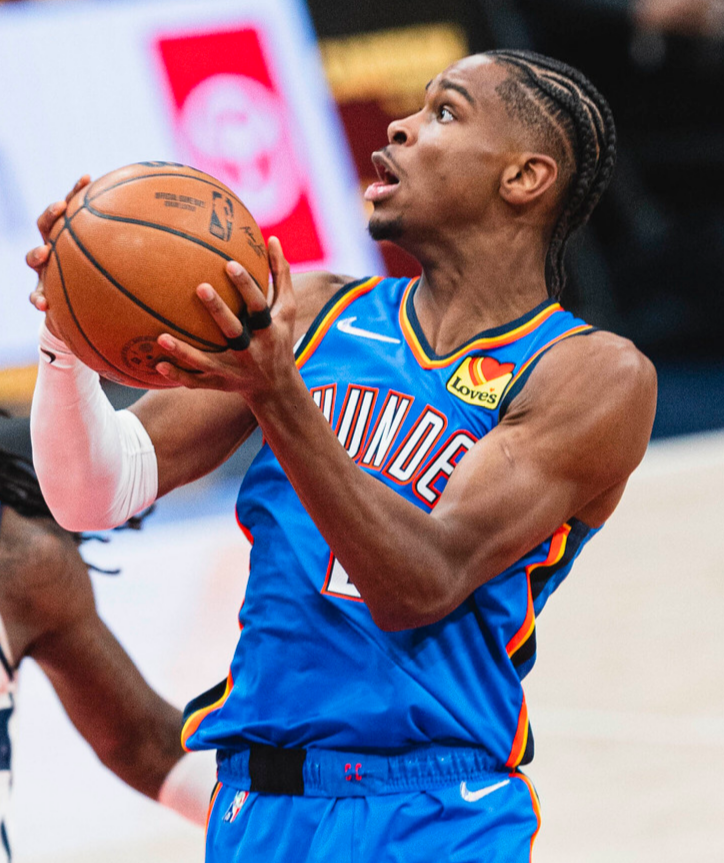
Shai Gilgeous-Alexander in a game in 2022

Five-time NBA All-Star Al Horford was one of the players acquired before the season. After one season, he was also traded for four-time All-Star Kemba Walker, with Thunder acquiring first-round draft picks as well in both transactions.

By the summer of 2021, the Thunder accumulated 36 total draft picks over the next seven years, 18 in the first round and 18 in the second. In the 2021 NBA draft, Thunder drafted Josh Giddey, Alperen Şengün and Tre Mann with their first-round picks, Şengün was then traded for two future draft picks. On August 6, 2021, Shai Gilgeous-Alexander signed a 5-year maximum contract extension worth $172 million. On the same day, Thunder waived Kemba Walker after he agreed to a buy-out.

On May 1, 2021, the Thunder lost at home to the Indiana Pacers by 57 points, 152–95, the largest regular season home loss in NBA history and one point less than the record-holding New Orleans Hornets home playoff loss in 2009. During the next season, on December 2, 2021, the Thunder lost on the road to the Memphis Grizzlies by 73 points, 79–152, the largest loss in NBA history.

At the 2022 NBA draft, the Thunder used their second overall pick to select Chet Holmgren and the twelfth pick to select Jalen Williams. On August 25, 2022, it was announced that Holmgren would miss the entire 2022–23 NBA season due to a Lisfranc injury in his foot that occurred during a Pro-am game. In the 2022–23 season, the Thunder finished regular season with the 10th-best record in the Western conference, qualifying for the play-in-tournament. After defeating the New Orleans Pelicans in their first play-in game, the Thunder lost to the Minnesota Timberwolves and did not qualify for the playoffs despite Shai Gilgeous-Alexander's leap to superstardom, averaging 31.1 points per game.

==== 2023–present: Return to championship contention ====
In the 2023–24 season, the Thunder acquired former All-Star Gordon Hayward. Chet Holmgren returned from injury and made an immediate impact as a rookie, Jalen Williams improved and Gilgeous-Alexander made his second All Star team and would later place second in MVP voting. On March 31, 2024, against the New York Knicks, the Thunder officially clinched a playoff berth with a 113–112 victory – their first playoff berth since the 2019–20 season. The Thunder finished with a record of 57 wins and 25 losses, clinching the top seed in the Western Conference for the first time since 2012–13. Mark Daigneault won the Coach Of The Year Award as the Thunder swept the New Orleans Pelicans in the first round becoming the youngest team to ever win a playoff series at an average age of 25 years old, but would lose to Luka Dončić's Dallas Mavericks in six games, even though they were up 17 points at one point in the series-deciding game 6.

Their first move in the off-season was trading starting guard Josh Giddey for the Chicago Bulls' guard Alex Caruso. Isaiah Hartenstein was also signed as a backup to Chet Holmgren who was now entering his sophomore year. The Thunder signed Nikola Topić, Dillon Jones and Ajay Mitchell to rookie contracts as the Thunder went into the 2024–25 season with high expectations.

After 10 games of good play, Holmgren went down with a rare hip injury and was announced to miss at least eight weeks leaving the Thunder short-handed with Hartenstein also being out. After missing the first 15 games of the season, Hartenstein returned on November 20, 2024.

Even without Holmgren, the Thunder beat the Houston Rockets to advance to the NBA Cup finals. They faced the Milwaukee Bucks, but lost the game 97–81. Despite this loss, the Thunder achieved their longest win streak in franchise history, setting a record at 15 consecutive wins. The streak ended when they lost to the Cleveland Cavaliers, who themselves were on a 10-game winning streak. It was the first time that a team on a 15-game winning streak had played a team on a 10-game winning streak in NBA history. Mark Daigneault was chosen as the head coach of one of the teams in the 2025 NBA All-Star Game. Gilgeous-Alexander was selected for his third straight All-Star Game and second start in a row and Jalen Williams made his first All-Star team as a reserve. On March 27, 2025, in a 125–104 win over the Memphis Grizzlies, the Thunder set a franchise record for total wins in a season at 61, beating the previous record of 60 wins set in the 2012–13 season on a 37-point outing from Gilgeous-Alexander and a double-double from Hartenstein. They finished the season with the top spot in the league with 68 wins. On May 8, the Thunder scored 87 points, breaking the record for most points in first half of an NBA playoff game. The previous record of 86 points was held by the Cleveland Cavaliers, set during the 2017 NBA Finals against the Golden State Warriors. In May 2025, Shai Gilgeous-Alexander was named NBA's most valuable player, becoming the third player in franchise history to receive the award, and was also named to All-NBA first team, while Jalen Williams made the All-NBA third team. The Thunder advanced to the NBA Finals and defeated the Indiana Pacers in seven games to win their first NBA championship since moving to Oklahoma City.

OKC continued to play with championship pedigree in the 2025–26 NBA season, with the Thunder holding the best record in the Western conference at the All star break with a 42-14 record. Sam Presti added another young scorer to the team when he acquired Jared McCain from the Philadelphia 76ers. On April 9, 2026, the Thunder secured the first seed in the Western Conference for the third year in a row following their win against the Los Angeles Clippers.

== Rivalries ==
=== San Antonio Spurs ===
The Spurs-Thunder rivalry dates back to the 2010s era of basketball which included stars Tim Duncan, Kevin Durant, and Tony Parker. Both squads faced off three times in the playoffs, including two Western Conference Finals matchups with the Thunder holding the 2–1 advantage.

In the 2020s, the rivalry became prominent, driven by matchups between young players such as Victor Wembanyama and Shai Gilgeous-Alexander. Following the Spurs' early-season success against the defending champions Thunder, including wins in the NBA Cup, the teams developed a familiarity, with geographic proximity in Texas and Oklahoma adding to the tension.

=== Dallas Mavericks ===
The Mavericks-Thunder rivalry in the early 2010s was a premier Western Conference matchup defined by high-stakes playoff battles, most notably in 2011 and 2012. Dallas overcame OKC in the 2011 WCF en route to a title, while the Thunder swept the defending-champion Mavericks in the 2012 first round.

In the 2020s, The rivalry is emerged in the mid-2020s as one of the NBA's premier, heated matchups, characterized by intense playoff battles, stylistic differences, and geographic proximity. Fueled by the rise of superstars Luka Dončić and Shai Gilgeous-Alexander, the rivalry is considered a "must-watch" feud for the rest of the decade.

== Season-by-season record ==
List of the last five seasons completed by the Thunder. For the full season-by-season history, see List of Oklahoma City Thunder seasons.

Note: GP = Games played, W = Wins, L = Losses, W–L% = Winning percentage

Season	GP	W	L	W–L%	Finish	Playoffs
2021–22	82	24	58	.293	5th, Northwest	Did not qualify
2022–23	82	40	42	.488	3rd, Northwest	Did not qualify
2023–24	82	57	25	.695	1st, Northwest	Lost in conference semifinals, 2–4 (Mavericks)
2024–25	82	68	14	.829	1st, Northwest	NBA champions, 4–3 (Pacers)
2025–26	82	64	18	.780	1st, Northwest	Lost in conference finals, 3–4 (Spurs)

== Franchise accomplishments ==
=== Single game records ===
- Points: 58 (2 times), by Fred Brown vs. Golden State Warriors, March 23, 1974, and Russell Westbrook vs. Portland Trail Blazers, March 8, 2017
- Rebounds: 30, Jim Fox vs. Los Angeles Lakers, December 26, 1973
- Assists: 25, by Nate McMillan vs. Los Angeles Clippers, February 23, 1987
- Steals: 10 (2 times), by Gus Williams vs. New Jersey Nets, February 22, 1978, and Fred Brown vs. Philadelphia 76ers, December 3, 1976
- Blocks: 11, by Serge Ibaka vs. Denver Nuggets, February 19, 2012

== Home arenas ==
Note: All arenas used before 2008 were used by the defunct Seattle SuperSonics franchise.

Seattle arenas had hosted two NBA All-Star Games; the 1974 game in Seattle Center Coliseum and the 1987 game in the Kingdome, where SuperSonics forward Tom Chambers grabbed MVP honors.

- Seattle Center Coliseum 1967–1978 (occasionally used during the Kingdome years when the latter was unavailable due to either Seattle Mariners or Seattle Seahawks games)
- Kingdome 1978–1985
- Seattle Center Coliseum 1985–1994
- Tacoma Dome 1994–1995 (During Seattle Center Coliseum renovation)
- KeyArena (the remodeled and renamed Seattle Center Coliseum now Climate Pledge arena) 1995–2008

=== Paycom Center (2008–present) ===
Opened on June 8, 2002, as the Ford Center, Paycom Center was built without luxury accommodations but designed to accommodate luxury "buildouts" should a professional sports franchise make the Paycom Center their home arena. It was finished at a cost of $89.2 million.

A plan for such build-out improvements began in 2007, after an Oklahoma City-based ownership group bought the Seattle SuperSonics. A city ballot initiative, approved by a 62 percent margin on March 4, 2008, extended a one-cent city sales tax for 15 months to fund $101 million in budgeted improvements to the arena and a separate $20 million practice facility for a franchise to be moved from some other city.

Renovation work on the arena was delayed by the 2008–10 economic crisis, which reduced the city's revenue from sales taxes. Revised plans limited the size of a new glass entryway and eliminated a practice court to accommodate the shortfall. Major construction work on the arena expansion was also delayed from the summer of 2010 to the summer of 2011. Seating capacity of the stadium is 18,203 for professional NBA basketball games.

Similar revisions were made to the plans for the Thunder's separate practice facility, for a total savings of approximately $14 million. The Thunder's practice facility completion date was pushed back to about March 2011. Chesapeake Energy, which had naming rights after 2011 filed for chapter 11 bankruptcy on June 28, 2020, with a debt of $9 billion, with the effect on the arena's naming rights not yet known at that time. However, on April 20, 2021, the company terminated the deal as part of its corporate restructuring. The arena retained its name during the Thunder's search for a new sponsor.

On July 27, 2021, it was announced that Paycom will acquire the naming rights for the arena for a 15-year period, renaming it Paycom Center.

=== Continental Coliseum (2028–future) ===
On September 12, 2023, Oklahoma City announced they were planning on building a new downtown arena for the Thunder at the cost of at least $900 million and with an estimated 2029 opening. The team's owner requested that Oklahoma City provide most of the funding for the stadium construction cost. Oklahoma City Mayor David Holt, an avid supporter of the stadium subsidy, stated that he was confident that the team would leave Oklahoma City unless the city paid for the new stadium. In a December 2023 referendum, Oklahoma City voters voted to pay for at least $850 million of the cost of the stadium while the team, valued at $3 billion, would pay $50 million. Economics professor J.C. Bradbury, who specializes in the study of stadium subsidies, wrote of the agreement, "It is by far the worst stadium deal I've ever seen negotiated from a public standpoint."

== Mascots ==
Note: All mascots used before 2008 were used by the original Seattle SuperSonics franchise.

- Wheedle, 1978–1985
- Squatch, 1993–2008

=== Rumble the Bison ===
On February 17, 2009, Rumble the Bison was introduced as the Oklahoma City Thunder mascot during halftime of a game against the New Orleans Hornets. Rumble was the winner of the 2008–2009 NBA Mascot of the Year.

== Fanbase ==
During the 2012 NBA Finals, sportswriter Bill Simmons published a piece on the team's fan base in his ESPN-sponsored Web outlet, Grantland.com, in which he noted the unusual enthusiasm of the city for its team:

With the possible exception of Portland, no NBA team means more to its city. This goes beyond having the loudest fans. There's genuine devotion here. These people arrived a good 45 minutes early for last night's Game 1—and by "these people" I mean "everyone with a ticket"—then clapped their way through pregame warm-ups with such infectious enthusiasm that I remember saying to a friend, "No way these yahoos keep this up for three hours, they're going to burn out." Wrong. You know what burned out? My eardrums. My head is still ringing.

Simmons speculated that the Oklahoma City bombing played a major part in the team's culture, noting that Thunder general manager Sam Presti has every new Thunder player visit the Oklahoma City National Memorial, and encourages players to look into the stands and consider that many of the team's fans were personally affected by the event. He also noted, however, that the fact that the Thunder is the only team from Oklahoma City (or indeed the state of Oklahoma) in one of the nation's four major leagues contributes mightily to the city's devotion.

Thunder fans are also reportedly much more likely to attend major home games than most other NBA fanbases. According to a source in the ticket industry, only five percent of tickets to the 2012 NBA conference finals listed for sale on secondary market sites such as StubHub were for Thunder home games, and for every ticket listed for a Thunder home game in the 2012 NBA Finals, 10 tickets for Heat home games were listed.

The team and its fanbase regularly use the slogan "Thunder Up!" which was prominently displayed on T-shirts during the 2012 playoffs.

In the 2023–24 season, the Thunder ranked 23rd out of 30 teams in per-game attendance while filling under 96% of their arena on average.

== Personnel ==
=== Current roster ===
Oklahoma City Thunder roster
Players

Pos.	No.	Player	Height	Weight	DOB	From
G	23	Brooks Barnhizer (TW)	6 ft 5 in (1.96 m)	230 lb (104 kg)	2002-03-02	Northwestern
G	9	Alex Caruso	6 ft 5 in (1.96 m)	186 lb (84 kg)	1994-02-28	Texas A&M
G	18	Nique Clifford	6 ft 5 in (1.96 m)	210 lb (95 kg)	2002-02-09	Colorado State
G	21	Josh Dix (TW)	6 ft 5 in (1.96 m)	213 lb (97 kg)	2004-06-29	Creighton
G	2	Shai Gilgeous-Alexander	6 ft 6 in (1.98 m)	195 lb (88 kg)	1998-07-12	Kentucky
F/C	55	Isaiah Hartenstein	7 ft 0 in (2.13 m)	250 lb (113 kg)	1998-05-05	Germany
F/C	7	Chet Holmgren (injured)	7 ft 1 in (2.16 m)	208 lb (94 kg)	2002-05-01	Gonzaga
C	15	Aday Mara	7 ft 3 in (2.21 m)	255 lb (116 kg)	2005-04-07	Michigan
G	3	Jared McCain	6 ft 2 in (1.88 m)	195 lb (88 kg)	2004-02-20	Duke
G	25	Ajay Mitchell	6 ft 4 in (1.93 m)	190 lb (86 kg)	2002-06-25	UC Santa Barbara
G/F	16	Micah Peavy (TW)	6 ft 6 in (1.98 m)	215 lb (98 kg)	2001-07-16	Georgetown
C	12	Thomas Sorber (injured)	6 ft 9 in (2.06 m)	250 lb (113 kg)	2005-12-25	Georgetown
G	14	Bennett Stirtz	6 ft 3 in (1.91 m)	180 lb (82 kg)	2003-10-03	Iowa
G	44	Nikola Topić	6 ft 6 in (1.98 m)	200 lb (91 kg)	2005-08-10	Serbia
G	22	Cason Wallace (injured)	6 ft 3 in (1.91 m)	195 lb (88 kg)	2003-11-07	Kentucky
G/F	8	Jalen Williams (injured)	6 ft 5 in (1.96 m)	211 lb (96 kg)	2001-04-14	Santa Clara
F	6	Jaylin Williams	6 ft 9 in (2.06 m)	240 lb (109 kg)	2002-06-29	Arkansas
G/F	34	Kenrich Williams	6 ft 7 in (2.01 m)	210 lb (95 kg)	1994-12-02	TCU

Coaches
Head coach
- Mark Daigneault
Assistant(s)
- Bryce Alford
- David Akinyooye
- Dave Bliss
- Grant Gibbs
- Connor Johnson
- Eric Maynor
- Zoe Vernon
- Mike Wilks
- Kameron Woods

Legend
- (DP) Unsigned draft pick
- (FA) Free agent
- (S) Suspended
- (GL) On assignment to G League affiliate
- (TW) Two-way affiliate player
- Injured

Roster
Updated: November 4, 2026

=== Individual awards ===
For details on Seattle SuperSonics history, see Seattle SuperSonics records.

NBA Most Valuable Player

- Kevin Durant – 2014
- Russell Westbrook – 2017
- Shai Gilgeous-Alexander – 2025, 2026

NBA Western Conference Finals Most Valuable Player

- Shai Gilgeous-Alexander – 2025

NBA Finals Most Valuable Player

- Shai Gilgeous-Alexander 2025

NBA All-Star head coach

- Scott Brooks – 2012, 2014
- Mark Daigneault – 2025

NBA Coach of the Year

- Scott Brooks – 2010
- Mark Daigneault – 2024

NBA Executive of the Year

- Sam Presti – 2025

NBA Sixth Man of the Year

- James Harden – 2012

NBA Clutch Player of the Year

- Shai Gilgeous-Alexander – 2026

NBA Community Assist Award

- Russell Westbrook – 2015
- Chris Paul – 2020

NBA scoring champion

- Kevin Durant – 2010, 2011, 2012, 2014
- Russell Westbrook – 2015, 2017
- Shai Gilgeous-Alexander – 2025

NBA assists leader

- Russell Westbrook – 2018, 2019

NBA blocks leader

- Serge Ibaka – 2012, 2013

All-NBA First Team

- Kevin Durant – 2010, 2011, 2012, 2013, 2014
- Russell Westbrook – 2016, 2017
- Paul George – 2019
- Shai Gilgeous-Alexander – 2023, 2024, 2025, 2026

All-NBA Second Team

- Russell Westbrook – 2011, 2012, 2013, 2015, 2018
- Kevin Durant – 2016
- Chris Paul – 2020

All-NBA Third Team

- Paul George – 2018
- Russell Westbrook – 2019
- Jalen Williams – 2025
- Chet Holmgren – 2026

NBA All-Defensive First Team

- Serge Ibaka – 2012, 2013, 2014
- Paul George – 2019
- Luguentz Dort – 2025
- Chet Holmgren – 2026

NBA All-Defensive Second Team

- Thabo Sefolosha – 2010
- André Roberson – 2017
- Jalen Williams – 2025
- Cason Wallace – 2026

NBA All-Rookie First Team

- Russell Westbrook – 2009
- Jalen Williams – 2023
- Chet Holmgren – 2024

NBA All-Rookie Second Team

- James Harden – 2010
- Steven Adams – 2014
- Josh Giddey – 2022
- Cason Wallace – 2024

All-NBA Cup Team

- Shai Gilgeous-Alexander – 2024, 2025

NBA All-Star Game

- Kevin Durant – 2010, 2011, 2012, 2013, 2014, 2015, 2016
- Russell Westbrook – 2011, 2012, 2013, 2015, 2016, 2017, 2018, 2019
- Paul George – 2018, 2019
- Chris Paul – 2020
- Shai Gilgeous-Alexander – 2023, 2024, 2025, 2026
- Jalen Williams – 2025
- Chet Holmgren – 2026

NBA All Star Game Most Valuable Player

- Kevin Durant – 2012
- Russell Westbrook – 2015, 2016

Slam Dunk Contest

- Hamidou Diallo – 2019

Rising Stars Challenge MVP

- Kevin Durant – 2009

Rising Stars Challenge Team

- Kevin Durant – 2009
- Jeff Green – 2009
- Russell Westbrook – 2009, 2010
- James Harden – 2010, 2011
- Serge Ibaka – 2011
- Steven Adams – 2014, 2015
- Alex Abrines – 2017
- Domantas Sabonis – 2017
- Shai Gilgeous-Alexander – 2020
- Luguentz Dort – 2021
- Théo Maledon – 2021
- Josh Giddey – 2022, 2023
- Jalen Williams – 2023, 2024
- Chet Holmgren – 2024
- Cason Wallace – 2024
- Ajay Mitchell – 2026

=== Retired numbers ===
Since moving from Seattle to Oklahoma City, the Thunder have officially retired one jersey number: 4, retired on March 20, 2019, to honor Nick Collison, who played for the team from 2003 to 2018.

The Seattle SuperSonics had retired six numbers and awarded an honorary microphone to longtime broadcaster Bob Blackburn, who had called most of the team's games from 1967 through 1992.

Oklahoma City Thunder retired numbers
No.	Player	Position	Tenure	Date
1	Gus Williams	G	1977–1984	March 26, 2004
4	Nick Collison	F	2003–2018	March 20, 2019
10	Nate McMillan	G	1986–1998 ^{1}	March 24, 1999
19	Lenny Wilkens	G	1968–1972 ^{2}	October 19, 1979
24	Spencer Haywood	F	1970–1975	February 26, 2007
32	Fred Brown	G	1971–1984	November 6, 1986
43	Jack Sikma	C	1977–1986	November 21, 1992
	Bob Blackburn	Broadcaster	1967–1992	

Notes:

- ^{1} Served as head coach (2000–2005).
- ^{2} Served as head coach (1969–1972; 1977–1985).
- The Thunder have announced that they will being retiring Russell Westbrook’s No. 0 jersey when the team plays the New York Knicks on February 7, 2027.
- The NBA retired Bill Russell's No. 6 for all its member teams on August 11, 2022.

=== Basketball Hall of Famers ===
Oklahoma City Thunder Hall of Famers
Players
No.	Name	Position	Tenure	Inducted
7	Carmelo Anthony	F	2017–2018	2025
Coaches
Name		Position	Tenure	Inducted
Billy Donovan		Head coach	2015–2020	2025

== Staff ==
=== General managers ===
- 2008–present: Sam Presti

== Logos and uniforms ==
The Oklahoma City Thunder unveiled their first logo on September 3, 2008. According to majority owner Clay Bennett, the team's logo takes several of its elements from other Oklahoma sports teams, such as the Oklahoma Sooners and Oklahoma State Cowboys and Cowgirls. The uniform design was unveiled on September 29, 2008.

An alternate uniform was unveiled on November 8, 2012, featuring navy blue and white. Unlike their regular uniforms, the wordmarks on the alternate are written vertically.

A second alternate uniform was unveiled on March 1, 2015. A white uniform with sleeves, it features the Thunder partial logo in the center of the chest, and the shorts have bolts in light blue and sunset colors.

A third alternate uniform was unveiled on September 25, 2015. A sunset-colored uniform, it features the Oklahoma City abbreviation "OKC" in navy block letters trimmed in white. On the back of the jersey, player names sit below the numbers. The shorts display a sunset base with navy panels down the side with the Thunder partial logo on each leg. The Thunder wore the sunset alternates for 18 games in the 2015–2016 season, including all 13 of its Sunday games.

Moving to Nike in 2017, the Thunder kept their existing white ("Association") and blue ("Icon") uniforms almost intact with the exception of the "OKC" abbreviation on the beltline and truncated shoulder stripes. The team also released a new alternate "Statement" uniform with italicized "OKC" lettering in sunset orange and a navy base with blue gradients intended to evoke the sound of cheering.

The Thunder also collaborated with Nike to produce annual "City" edition uniforms intended to pay tribute to local cultures or team traditions. The 2017–18 "City" uniform had a grey base with sunset orange and blue lines that were inspired by the Thunder's uptempo style. For 2018–19, the Thunder's "City" uniform had a turquoise base and bold white lettering with navy and sunset orange trim; the uniform was inspired by Oklahoma's Native American heritage.

Nike also released an "Earned" uniform starting with the 2018–19 season and were only given to the 16 teams who qualified in the 2018 NBA playoffs. The Thunder's "Earned" uniform was a basic palette swap of the team's "Statement" uniforms, featuring a sunset orange base and navy letters.

For the 2019–20 season, the Thunder unveiled new uniforms. The white "Association" uniform had the city name in front along with the outline of the state of Oklahoma on the beltline. The front of the blue "Icon" uniform had the team name in front while keeping the OKC acronym on the beltline. Their sunset-orange "Earned" uniforms from the previous season were the basis of their new "Statement" uniform, albeit with lighter blue lettering. A new "City" uniform for the season commemorated the 25th anniversary of the Oklahoma City bombing and it featured a black and gold palette.

The "City" uniform for 2020–21 had a black base with the Thunder's signature blue and orange splashed throughout. The uniform had the state name "Oklahoma" in front as homage to the state itself. As in 2019, the Thunder's appearance in the 2020 NBA playoffs gave them an "Earned" uniform for the 2021 season. The uniform featured a navy blue base with "Thunder" written in white with light blue drop shadows. Orange was absent on the uniform.

The Thunder's 2021–22 "City" uniform mixed various elements from their previous and current uniforms. The white and gray uniform featured the vertically arranged "OKC" lettering on the right chest (taken from the 2012–16 navy alternates), the white and gray patterns within the "OKC" lettering (taken from the 2017–19 "Statement" uniforms), the white and gray sash on the left leg (taken from the 2018–19 "City" uniforms), and the generic logo the Thunder first used in 2008 on the waist.

The Thunder's 2022–23 "City" uniform had a black base, blue letters and red, orange and white accents in honor of the people of Oklahoma.

The "City" uniform for the 2023–24 season was a black and blue base with orange "OKC" lettering and gold numbers. The uniform also had sublimated images of various Thunder logos and wordmarks, and were meant to pay tribute to the city's renaissance. This look was further developed for the 2024–25 "City" uniform, which like the 2022–23 "City" uniform had just the state name of "Oklahoma" in front. The black-based uniform had blue stripes with sublimated Thunder logos, along with gold letters.

The "City" uniform in the 2025–26 season was a recolored version of their 2018–19 "City" uniform, using a navy blue and gray base.

After winning the NBA championship in 2025, the Thunder added a gold tab on the back of their uniforms to signify their maiden championship victory. The NBA championship tabs have been in use on all uniforms worn by teams who have won a championship since the 2014–15 season, but the Thunder refused to acknowledge the SuperSonics' 1979 championship as part of its history. As such, their gold tabs only denote the championship they won in Oklahoma City.

== Television and radio ==
=== Radio ===
All Thunder games are broadcast on the Thunder Radio Network, fronted by flagship stations WWLS-FM (98.1) and KWPN (640 AM) in Oklahoma City. Matt Pinto is the radio voice of the Thunder.

=== Television ===
For their first two seasons, the Thunder's TV broadcasts were split between Fox Sports Oklahoma (a regional fork of Fox Sports Southwest), which broadcast most of the games, and independent station KSBI (channel 52), with around 65 Thunder games airing during the season and more than half of the games available in HD on Fox Sports Oklahoma, along with other team-related programming such as pre-game shows. Around 15 to 20 regular season games were broadcast over the air on KSBI, which had a network of re-broadcasters spanning the entire state. All televised games are called by Brian Davis on play-by-play and Michael Cage as color commentator. During the 2009–10 season, KSBI telecast all Thunder games it aired in high definition (KSBI had previously aired in HD the first regular season game played at the Ford Center—against the Milwaukee Bucks on October 29, 2008—while all other games during the 2008–09 season were telecast on KSBI in standard definition).

On August 3, 2010, the Thunder signed a new exclusive multi-year agreement with Fox Sports Oklahoma (since rebranded as Bally Sports Oklahoma as of 2021), beginning with the 2010–11 season, ending the team's broadcasts on KSBI. On October 22, 2012, the Thunder announced that Lesley McCaslin would be the new Thunder sideline reporter. On July 21, 2014, the Thunder announced that Long would not return to be its TV color commentator on Fox Sports Oklahoma. On September 17, 2014, the Oklahoma City Thunder announced that 15-year NBA veteran Michael Cage would be the new color analyst, joining Brian Davis on television and Matt Pinto on the radio when the game is exclusive to a national television broadcast. Davis was replaced as the television play-by-play announcer by Chris Fisher before the 2018–19 season.

As a result of the bankruptcy of Bally Sports parent company Diamond Sports Group, in January 2024, the Thunder reached an agreement with Griffin Media to air a package of eight Friday night games on local over-the-air stations within the team's territory during the remainder of the 2023–24 NBA season. Games aired on Griffin-owned KSBI/Oklahoma City and KOTV-DT3/Tulsa, and syndicated to stations owned by Gray Television (KSWO-DT3/Lawton and KSCW-DT/Wichita) and Morgan Murphy Media (KOAM-TV–KFJX–KFJX-DT3/Joplin–Pittsburg).

With the winddown of FanDuel Sports Network in 2026, the Thunder announced a deal with Griffin to take over distribution of the team's regional games in the 2026–27 NBA season via the "Thunder Gameday Network"; the games will primarily air on pay television-exclusive feeds of KSBI in Oklahoma City and KQCW in Tulsa distributed via participating television providers. Ten games will air on broadcast television, with six on KSBI/KQCW, and four on KWTV/KOTV. The team will also offer a "Thunder+" subscription service on the NBA app.

== Notes ==
Preceded by Boston Celtics	NBA champions 2024–25	Succeeded by New York Knicks
