= List of people from Tulsa, Oklahoma =

This is a list of well-known persons who were either born in, or lived in, Tulsa, Oklahoma.

== Arts ==
- Joe Brainard (1942–1994), painter
- Charles Bell (1935–1995), artist
- Ted Berrigan (1934–1983), poet
- Shan Goshorn (1957–2018), artist
- James Pepper Henry, artist and Gilcrease Museum director (2015–2017)
- Roman Jasinski (1907–1991), ballet dancer and teacher
- Ron Padgett (b. 1942), poet

== Business ==
- Frank Abagnale (born 1948), fraud expert, former con man, subject of Catch Me If You Can
- Cyrus Avery (1870–1963), businessman and "father of Route 66"
- Bill Bartmann (c. 1949–2016), businessman, named as "One of the Top 100 Entrepreneurs of the Last 100 Years"
- W. Tate Brady (1870–1925), businessman, owner of the Brady Hotel
- James A. Chapman (1881–1966), oilman and philanthropist
- Robert Galbreath Jr. (1863–1955), oilman who moved to Tulsa after he drilled the first oil well in Glenn Pool Field
- J. Paul Getty (1892–1976), oilman founder of Getty Oil Company, who made his first million in Tulsa between 1914 and 1916
- Thomas Gilcrease (1890–1962), oilman, founder of Gilcrease Museum
- Jay Graber (born 1991), software engineer and first CEO of Bluesky
- J. M. Hall (1851–1935), pioneer merchant in Tulsa, organized First Presbyterian Church
- George Kaiser (born 1942), chairman of BOK Financial Corporation
- Henry Kravis (born 1944), co-founder of Kohlberg Kravis Roberts & Co.
- James H. McBirney (1870–1944), co-founder and president National Bank of Commerce in Tulsa
- Sam P. McBirney (1877–1936), football coach and co-founder of National Bank of Commerce in Tulsa
- Robert M. McFarlin (1866–1942), oilman and philanthropist
- Waite Phillips (1883–1964), oilman and philanthropist
- Harry Ford Sinclair (1876–1956), founder of Sinclair Oil, co-founder of Exchange National Bank (later part of National Bank of Tulsa and Bank of Oklahoma; convicted of jury tampering during Teapot Dome scandal trial
- Carolyn Mary Skelly (1905–1996), eccentric daughter of William Grove Skelly; oil heiress; dubbed the most robbed woman in the U.S. by the Boston Globe; socialite; hosted fundraisers for President George H.W. Bush, and Texas Governor John Connally
- William G. Skelly (1877–1957), founder of Skelly Oil Company, Spartan Aircraft Company and Spartan School of Aeronautics, philanthropist
- William K. Warren Sr. (1897–1990), founder of Warren Petroleum Corporation; philanthropist
- John Smith Zink (1928–2005), engineer, owner of John Zink Industries, automobile racer

== Music ==
- Admiral Twin (Mark Carr, Jarrod Gollihare, John Russell, Brad Becker), rock band
- The Agony Scene, metalcore band
- AleXa, K-pop Idol
- Tuck Andress, guitarist
- Elvin Bishop (born 1942), blues and rock music singer-songwriter, guitarist and bandleader
- Garth Brooks (born 1962), country music singer
- Broncho, punk rock band with Ryan Lindsey, Johnathon Ford of Roadside Monument, and Nathan Price
- Anita Bryant (1940–2024), singer
- J. J. Cale (1938–2013), songwriter and musician, an originator of The Tulsa Sound
- Capital Lights, pop rock band
- Rodney Carrington (born 1968), country music singer and comedian
- Jeff Carson (1963–2022), country musician
- Kristin Chenoweth (born 1968), actress, singer and author
- Chuck Cissel (born 1948), singer and dancer
- Roy Clark (1933–2018), country musician
- David Cook (born 1982), 2008 American Idol winner
- Denny Cordell (1943–1995), record producer, signed Tom Petty as part of Mudcrutch
- Ester Dean (born 1986), singer-songwriter
- Joe Diffie (1958–2020), country musician
- Phil Driscoll (born 1947), trumpet player and singer, Christian and jazz musician
- Ronnie Dunn (born 1953) (Brooks and Dunn)
- Annie Ellicott (born 1984), jazz, swing singer
- Scott Ellison (born 1954), electric blues guitarist, singer and songwriter
- Ester Drang, indie band
- Rocky Frisco (1937–2015), pianist for J.J. Cale; 2008 inductee into Oklahoma Blues Hall of Fame
- The Gap Band, Charlie, Ronnie and Robert Wilson, R&B, funk, and soul band
- David Gates (born 1940), pop rock musician (Bread)
- Hanson, Isaac, Taylor and Zac Hanson, Pop rock band
- Hardie Avenue, Christian alternative rock band
- Gus Hardin (1945–1996), female country musician
- Jacob Fred Jazz Odyssey, jazz band
- William Johns (born 1936), opera singer
- Jim Keltner (born 1942), drummer for the Traveling Wilburys
- Tosca Kramer (1903–1976), violinist, violist, and music educator
- Fredell Lack (1922–2017), violinist
- Lega-C (born 1976), rapper
- Leon McAuliffe (1917–1988), steel guitarist with Bob Wills and his Texas Playboys
- Little Joe McLerran (born 1983), singer, guitarist, recording artist and winner of 2009 International Blues Challenge
- John Moreland (born 1985), singer-songwriter
- Jamie Oldaker (1951–2020), drummer, Eric Clapton, Bob Seger
- Patti Page (1927–2013), singer
- PDA, rapper
- Pillar, band
- Johnny Polygon (born 1984), rapper
- Carl Radle (1942–1980), musician, bassist for Derek and the Dominos
- Ben Rector (born 1986), singer-songwriter
- Steve Ripley (1950–2019), engineer, producer, singer-songwriter and guitarist for The Tractors and Bob Dylan
- Leon Russell (1942–2016), singer-songwriter, pianist, guitarist, an originator of The Tulsa Sound and founder of The Church Studio
- SafetySuit, pop rock band
- Jacob Sartorius (born 2002), born in Tulsa but adopted and moved to upstate Virginia shortly after his birth
- Natalie Sims (born 1984), musician, songwriter and music executive
- Andy Skib (born 1985), guitarist, keyboardist in David Cook's band
- Clyde Stacy (1936–2013), rockabilly musician
- Ryan Tedder (born 1979), producer, songwriter, lead singer of OneRepublic
- David Teegarden, rock drummer with Teegarden & Van Winkle and with Bob Seger
- Flash Terry (1934–2004), blues musician
- Neal Tiemann (born 1982), lead guitarist in David Cook's band
- Wayman Tisdale (1964–2009), jazz musician and former professional basketball player
- Dara Tucker (born 1958), singer-songwriter and documentary filmmaker
- Dwight Twilley (1951–2023), power pop, rock musician
- Jared Tyler (born 1978), singer-songwriter and producer
- Unwed Sailor, instrumental indie rock
- St. Vincent (born 1982)
- David T. Walker (born 1941), session guitarist, famous for his work with Jackson 5, Bobby Womack, Levert and Stevie Wonder among others
- Johnnie Lee Wills (1912–1984), western music band leader, brother of Bob Wills
- Charlie Wilson (born 1953), R&B singer and lead singer of The Gap Band
- Bob Wootton (1942–2017), lead guitarist for the Tennessee Three

== Politics ==
- Tom Adelson, member of the Oklahoma State Senate
- Alicia Andrews, former chair of the Oklahoma Democratic Party
- Bob Ballinger (born 1974), member of the Arkansas House of Representatives, reared in Tulsa
- Dewey F. Bartlett (1919–1979), former governor of the state of Oklahoma and U.S. senator
- Dewey F. Bartlett Jr. (born 1947), former mayor of Tulsa (2009–2016)
- G. T. Bynum (born 1977), mayor of Tulsa (2016–2024)
- Jim R. Caldwell, retired Church of Christ minister and former member of the Arkansas State Senate
- David Duke (born 1950), former grand wizard of the Ku Klux Klan and former member of the Louisiana House of Representatives
- David Hall (1930–2016), former governor of the state of Oklahoma
- Kevin Hern (born 1961), U.S. representative
- Linda Hughes O'Leary (born 1950), former member of the Cherokee Nation Tribal Council (2003–2007)
- James Inhofe (1934–2024), U.S. senator
- James R. Jones (born 1939), former member of the U.S. House of Representatives, chairman of the American Stock Exchange
- Frank Keating (born 1944), former governor of the state of Oklahoma
- John Albert Knebel (born 1936), secretary of agriculture in the Carter Administration
- Sheila Kuehl (born 1941), former actress, now California state senator
- Steve Largent (born 1954), former member of the U.S. House of Representatives
- Phyllis Lyon (1924–2020), feminist and gay rights activist, co-founder of Daughters of Bilitis
- Willian F. Martin (born 1950), U.S. deputy secretary of energy
- Jim McConn (1928–1997), former mayor of Houston, Texas, 1979–1981
- Daniel Patrick Moynihan (1927–2003), former Democratic U.S. senator representing New York; born in Tulsa
- Markwayne Mullin (born 1977), U.S. senator for Oklahoma, U.S. secretary of Homeland Security
- George E. Nowotny (born 1932), retired Tulsa businessman and former member of the Arkansas House of Representatives from Fort Smith
- John Sullivan (born 1965), member of the U.S. House of Representatives
- Kathy Taylor (born 1955), mayor of Tulsa (2006–2009)
- John Volz (1935–2011), attorney for the U.S. District Court for the Eastern District of Louisiana, died in Tulsa in 2011
- Roger G. Wells (1940–2023), member of the New Hampshire House of Representatives
- R. James Woolsey Jr. (born 1941), former director, Central Intelligence Agency
- Terry Young (born 1948), former mayor of the City of Tulsa

== Print ==
- Mildred Grosberg Bellin (1908–2008), Jewish cookbook author
- William Bernhardt (born 1960), mystery/suspense fiction author
- Daniel J. Boorstin (1914–2004), historian and writer; former Librarian of Congress
- Cleora Butler (1901–1985), chef, caterer and cookbook writer
- Dorothy Carnegie (1912–1998), author
- P.C. Cast (born 1960), author
- John Hope Franklin (1915–2009), African American historian; namesake of John Hope Franklin Reconciliation Park in Tulsa
- Martin Gardner (1914–2010), author of works on philosophy, mathematics and literature
- Sterling Gates (born 1981), comic book writer (Supergirl, Action Comics)
- Joy Harjo (born 1951), poet, musician, and author; first Native American Poet Laureate, and first Poet Laureate from Oklahoma
- S.E. Hinton (born 1948), author (The Outsiders, That Was Then, This Is Now, Tex)
- Mercedes Lackey (born 1950), science-fiction author
- R.A. Lafferty (1914–2002), science-fiction author
- Billie Letts (1938–2014), author, Where the Heart Is
- Tracy Letts (born 1965), Pulitzer Prize-winning playwright and actor (August: Osage County)
- Joe McGuff (1926–2006), journalist and newspaper editor
- Russell Myers (born 1938), cartoonist, Broom-Hilda comic strip
- Denver Nicks, journalist
- Dan Piraro (born 1958), cartoonist of the Bizarro comic strip
- Nancy Speir, children's book illustrator
- Grace Steele Woodward (1899–1987), writer and historian
- William P. Steven (1908–1991), journalist and newspaper editor
- Clifton Taulbert, author, Once Upon a Time When We Were Colored
- Will Thomas (born 1958), mystery fiction author
- Mildred Ladner Thompson (1918–2013), reporter for The Wall Street Journal and Tulsa World
- Michael Wallis (born 1945), author, Route 66, Pretty Boy Floyd, Mankiller, Billy the Kid
- K. D. Wentworth (1951–2012), science-fiction author
- Cornel West (born 1953), theologian, author

== Radio ==
- Paul Harvey (1918–2009), radio personality

== Screen and stage ==
- Pamela Bach (born 1962), actress; ex-wife of David Hasselhoff
- Marshall Bell (born 1942), actor
- William Boyd (1895–1972), aka Hopalong Cassidy, western actor (born in Hendrysburg, Ohio)
- Max Burnett (born 1969), TV writer, screenwriter and director
- Gary Busey (born 1944), actor
- Cindy Chupack (born 1965), screenwriter for Sex and the City
- Larry Clark (born 1943), film director and photographer
- Iron Eyes Cody (1904–1999), actor
- Jay Dee (born 1979), comedian
- Larry Drake (1949–2016), actor
- Blake Edwards (1922–2010), film director
- Sue England (1928–2018), actress
- Josh Fadem (born 1980), actor, writer and comedian
- Bill Hader (born 1978), actor, writer and comedian
- Sterlin Harjo (born 1979), filmmaker
- Josh Henderson (born 1981), actor
- John Ingle (1928–2012), actor
- Eva Jinek (born 1978), news anchor
- Jennifer Jones (1919–2009), actress
- Heather Langenkamp (born 1964), actress
- Tracy Letts (born 1965), actor and writer
- Tommy Morrison (1969–2013), boxer and actor
- Jerry Nelson (1934–2012), actor, puppeteer
- Tim Blake Nelson (born 1964), actor and director
- Mary Kay Place (born 1947), actress
- Tony Randall (1920–2004), actor
- Julián Rebolledo, actor and voice talent
- Jack Roberts, actor
- Gailard Sartain (1943-2025), actor
- Mary Stuart (1926–2002), actress
- Wes Studi (born 1947), actor
- Paula Trickey (born 1966), actress
- Jeanne Tripplehorn (born 1963), actress
- Stacy Valentine, porn star
- Amber Valletta (born 1974), actress and supermodel
- Susan Watson (born 1938), Broadway actress
- Cory Williams (born 1981), Internet Personality
- Alfre Woodard (born 1952), actress
- Judy Woodruff (born 1946), television journalist
- Don Woods (1928–2012), meteorologist

== Sports ==
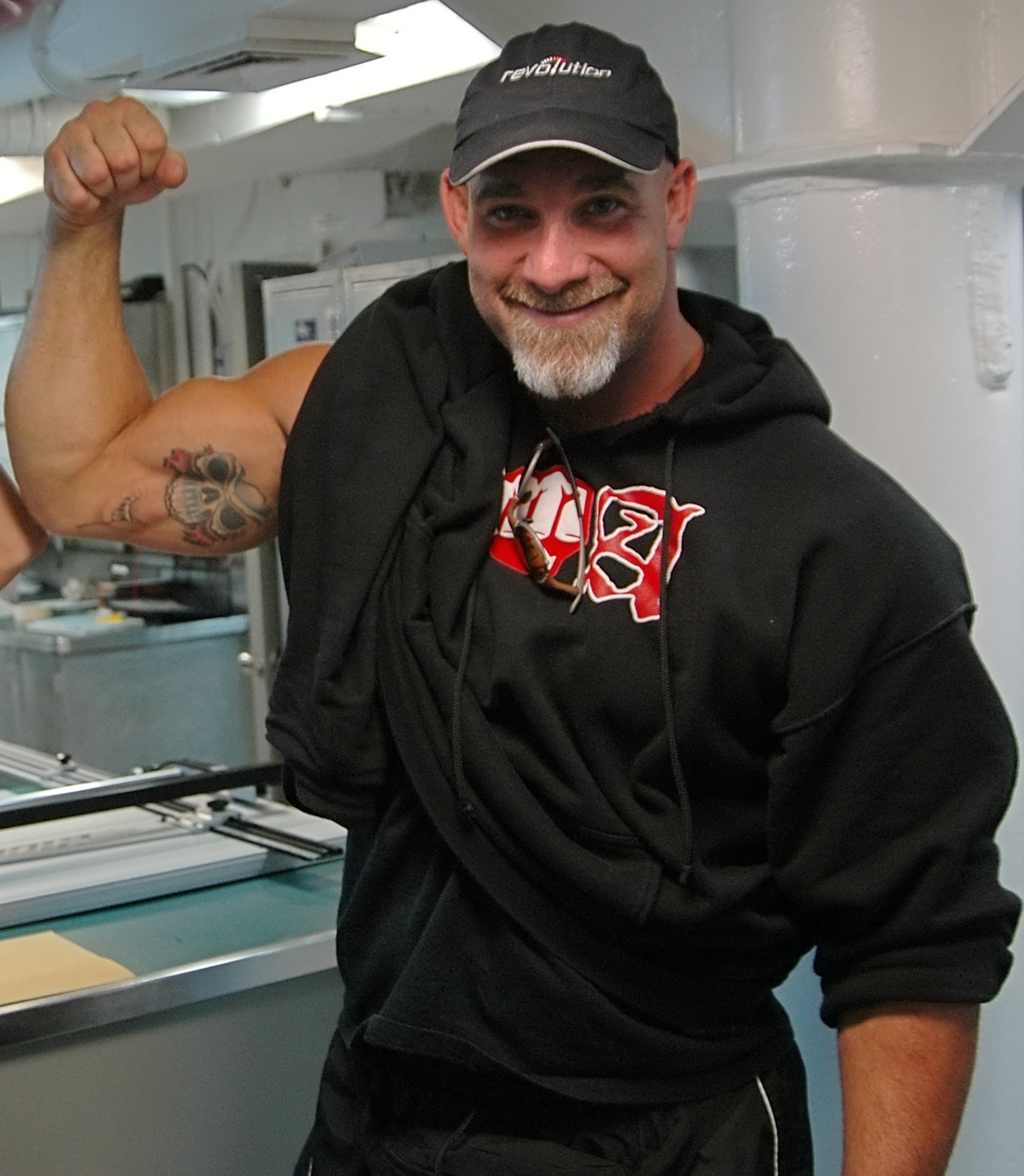
Bill Goldberg

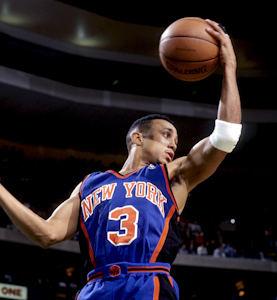
John Starks

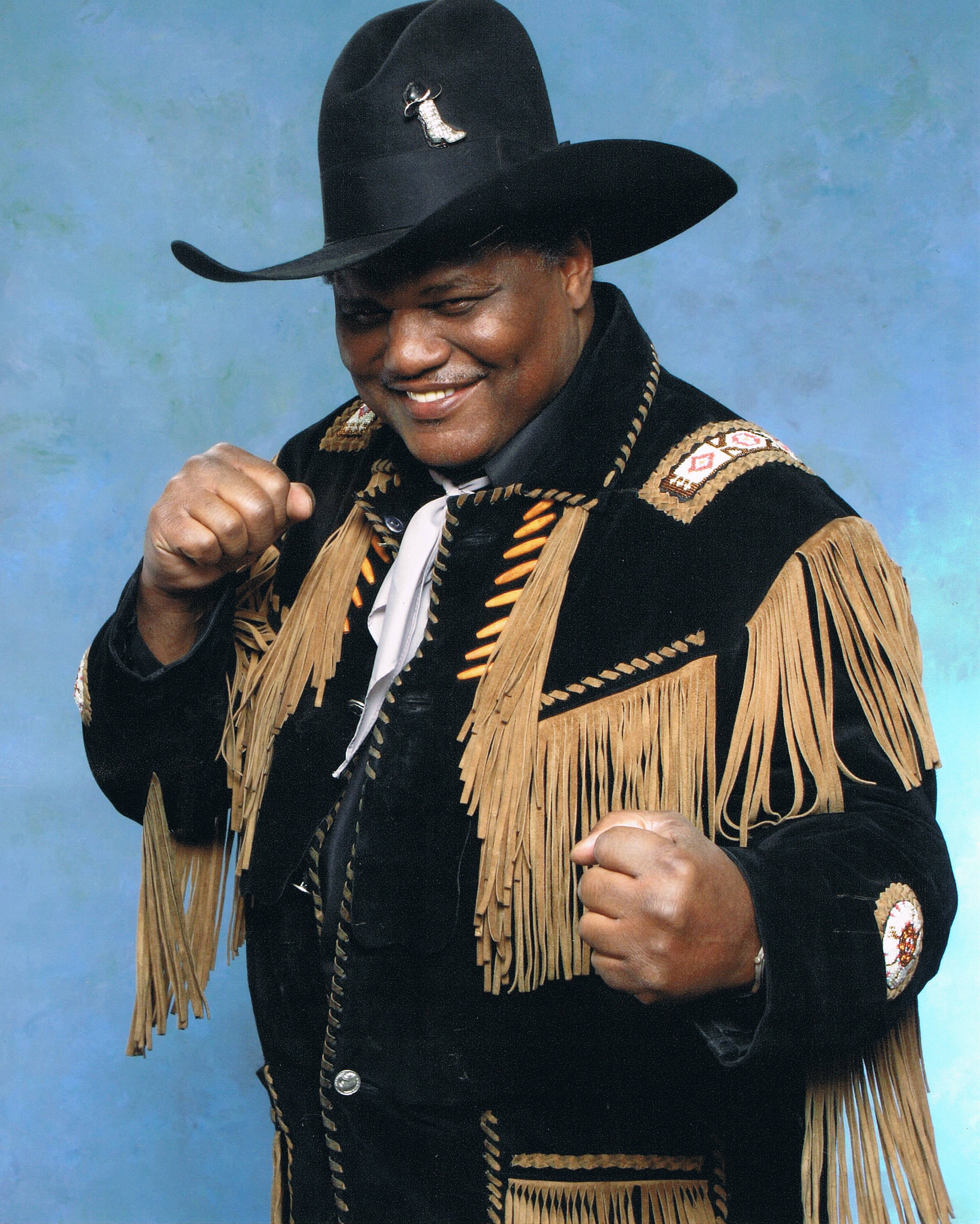
James Tillis

- Brent Albright (born 1978), professional wrestler
- Kelenna Azubuike (born 1983), professional basketball player
- Kenny Bednarek (born 1998), sprinter, Olympic and world championship silver medalist
- Randy Blake (born 1986), kickboxer
- Bill Blankenship (born 1956), football coach, head coach at University of Tulsa
- Anthony Bowie (born 1963), basketball player
- Michael Bowie (born 1991), former Seattle Seahawks offensive tackle
- Jordan Brailford (born 1995), defensive end for the Atlanta Falcons
- Dylan Bundy (born 1992), baseball pitcher for the Minnesota Twins
- Kenny Bundy (born 1981), soccer player and coach
- Mikey Burnett (born 1974), mixed martial artist
- Patrick Callan (born 1999), competitive swimmer
- Dale Cook (born 1956), kickboxer and actor
- Bobby Cox (born 1941), player, manager and Baseball Hall of Famer
- Chris Dade (born 1974), basketball player
- Richard Dumas (born 1969), professional basketball player for the Phoenix Suns
- Ebi Ere (born 1981), basketball player for Melbourne Tigers
- Terrance Ferguson (born 1998), basketball player for the Philadelphia 76ers
- Justin Fuente (born 1976), head football coach, Virginia Tech
- Reuben Gant (born 1952), football player for Buffalo Bills
- Matt Gogel (born 1971), professional golfer
- Bill Goldberg (born 1966), professional NFL football player and professional wrestler
- Todd Graham (born 1964), head coach of Tulsa Golden Hurricane football team (2007–2010)
- Matt Grice (born 1981), mixed martial arts fighter
- Tommy Hanson (1986–2015), baseball pitcher
- Chris Harris Jr. (born 1989), NFL, Cornerback
- Gerald Harris (born 1979), mixed martial artist
- Thomas Hatch (born 1994), pitcher for the Toronto Blue Jays
- Marques Haynes (1926–2015), Harlem Globetrotters player, Basketball Hall of Famer
- David Heath (born 1976), mixed martial artist
- Randy Heckenkemper (born 1958), golf course designer
- Daxton Hill (born 2000), NFL, safety
- Justice Hill (born 1997), NFL, running back
- Koyie Hill (born 1979), Major League Baseball catcher
- Zach Jackson (born 1994), Major League Baseball, pitcher for the Oakland Athletics
- Josh Jacobs (born 1996), NFL, running back
- Felix Jones (born 1987), Dallas Cowboys running back
- Dallas Keuchel (born 1988), pitcher for the Chicago White Sox
- Jim King (born 1941), NBA player and Tulsa Golden Hurricane men's basketball coach
- Jeff Krosnoff (1964–1996), Championship Auto Racing Teams driver
- Steve Largent (born 1954), Seattle Seahawks wide receiver, Pro Football Hall of Famer, also politician
- Kevin Lilly (born 1963), NFL player
- Kevin Lockett (born 1974), NFL player
- Tyler Lockett (born 1992), NFL player
- Zach Loyd (born 1987), soccer player
- Lee Mayberry (born 1970), professional basketball player for the Milwaukee Bucks
- Sam P. McBirney (1877–1936), coach of Tulsa Golden Hurricane football (1914–1916)
- R. W. McQuarters (born 1976), professional football cornerback
- Robert Meachem (born 1984), New Orleans Saints wide receiver
- Kenny Monday (born 1960), Olympic gold medalist and World Champion in freestyle wrestling
- Joe-Max Moore (born 1971), soccer forward, U.S. Soccer Hall of Fame 2013
- Reece Morrison (born 1945), NFL player
- Tommy Morrison (1969–2013), boxer, heavyweight contender and actor, Rocky V
- Ray Murphy, Jr. (1946–2010), collegiate wrestler and 1989 Handicapped Person of the Year
- Charlie O'Brien (born 1960), professional baseball catcher
- Janice O'Hara (1918–2001), All-American Girls Professional Baseball League player
- Peter Ramondetta (born 1982), professional skateboarder
- Nolan Richardson (born 1941), basketball coach for University of Tulsa and University of Arkansas, coach and general manager WNBA's Tulsa Shock
- Henry Schichtle (born 1941), football player
- Tubby Smith (born 1951), basketball coach
- John Starks (born 1965), basketball player
- Ricky Stromberg (born 2000), American football player
- Iciss Tillis (born 1981), professional basketball player for WNBA's Washington Mystics
- James "Quick" Tillis (born 1957), boxer, heavyweight contender and actor
- Wayman Tisdale (1964–2009), professional basketball player and musician
- Matt Wiman (born 1983), mixed martial arts fighter
- Darryl Wren (born 1967), gridiron football player
- John Smith Zink (1928–2005), automobile racing

== Religion ==
- Finis Alonzo Crutchfield, Jr. (1916–1986), United Methodist Church bishop, minister of Boston Avenue United Methodist Church, died in Tulsa
- Paul Vernon Galloway (1904–1990), minister of Boston Avenue United Methodist Church, later Methodist bishop
- Charles William Kerr (1875–1951), first permanent Protestant minister in Tulsa
- Carlton Pearson (1953–2023), evangelist
- Oral Roberts (1918–2009), pioneer televangelist, founder of Oral Roberts University, affiliated with United Methodist church
- Richard Roberts (born 1948), evangelist, and faith healer
- Mother Grace Tucker (1919–2012), Evangelical Christian pastor and philanthropist
- John B. Wolf (1925–2017), minister of All Souls Unitarian Universalist Church

== Other ==
- Joshua Anderson (born 1987), serial killer who shot five people to death in Tulsa between 2006 and 2007
- William French Anderson, geneticist, born in Tulsa in 1936
- Bobby Baldwin, professional poker player (1978 world champion) and casino executive; born in Tulsa
- Deborah Barnes, judge of the Oklahoma Appellate Court (1987–present); daughter-in-law of the late Justice Don Barnes
- Don Barnes (1924–2011), born in Tulsa, justice of the Oklahoma State Supreme Court (1972–1985)
- Jennifer Berry (born 1983), Miss America 2006
- Robert and Michael Bever, brothers who were convicted of murdering their parents and three siblings
- Phillip N. Butler (born 1938), the eighth longest-held US prisoner of war in North Vietnam, president of Veterans for Peace
- Roscoe Cartwright (1919–1974), first black field artilleryman promoted to brigadier general
- Stephen Z. Fadem, doctor and scientist
- Viola Fletcher, survivor of the Tulsa race massacre
- John Duncan Forsyth (1887–1963), architect
- Wayne Henry Garrison (born 1959), serial killer who killed three children between 1972 and 1989
- W. R. Holway (1893–1981), engineer, designer of Spavinaw water project
- Robert Lawton Jones (1925–2018), architect noted for his contributions to modern architecture
- Olivia Jordan (born 1988), Miss World America 2013, Miss Oklahoma USA 2015, Miss USA 2015
- Joseph R. Koberling, Jr. (1900–1990), architect
- Charles Page (1860–1926), philanthropist and founder of Sand Springs
- Leon B. Senter (1889–1965), architect
- Gordon Todd Skinner, drug dealer and convicted kidnapper
- William Angie Smith (1894–1974), Methodist bishop of Oklahoma
- Charles Tatum (1926–2014), World War II U.S. Marine Corps veteran, Bronze Star recipient, and race car driver
- Mother Grace Tucker (1919–2012), pastor and philanthropist

== Fictional ==
- Ponyboy Curtis, main character in S. E. Hinton's novel The Outsiders
- Mike Doonesbury, main character in Garry Trudeau's comic strip Doonesbury
- Roy D. Mercer, fictional radio character
