= Bryant Kirkland =

Minister of Presbyterian Church USA (1914–2000)

Bryant M. Kirkland
- Born: Bryant Mays Kirkland; May 2, 1914. Essex, Connecticut
- Died: April 23, 2000 (aged 85); Charlottesville, Virginia
- Occupation: Presbyterian minister
- Years active: 1938-1998
- Known for: Senior minister at First Presbyterian Church, Tulsa and Fifth Avenue Presbyterian Church in New York City

Bryant M. Kirkland (1914-2000) was a minister of the Presbyterian Church USA (PCUSA) in the United States.

== Early life ==
Born May 2, 1914 in Essex, Connecticut, he graduated from Wheaton College (Illinois) in 1935, then earned the Bachelor of Theology degree from Princeton University in 1938, and a master's degree at Eastern Baptist Seminary in 1946. He was ordained as a Presbyterian minister in Philadelphia, Pennsylvania in 1938.

== Career ==
He served churches at Willow Grove, Pennsylvania; Narberth, Pennsylvania and Haddonfield, New Jersey; then was called as senior minister at First Presbyterian Church in Tulsa, Oklahoma, before taking the pulpit of Fifth Avenue Presbyterian Church in New York City in 1962, where he served until he retired in 1987. Starting in the late 1960s, he travelled weekly to teach preaching at Princeton seminary. (Note: One of his students there, Thomas Tewell, a few years later succeeded Kirkland as senior minister of the Fifth Avenue Church.) He later served as president of the American Bible Society, and as interim minister at the National Presbyterian Church in Washington, D. C.(1991-1993) and churches in Moorestown, N.J., and Malvern, Pennsylvania. He was a visiting lecturer at Princeton Theological Seminary and a guest lecturer at the Army Chaplain School into the 1990s. (Note: The Army Chaplain Center and School (USACHCS) is located at Fort Jackson, South Carolina.)

After fully retiring, Kirkland and his second wife moved to a farm in Churchville, Virginia. He died on Easter Sunday morning, April 23, 2000, at a hospital in Charlottesville, Virginia.

== Personal ==
Kirkland married his first wife, Bernice Tanis, in 1941. She died in 1996. He remarried Lola Mae Shiftel in 1998, who survived him. Also surviving him were three daughters, two brothers, a sister, six grandchildren and three great grandchildren.

== Legacy ==
Kirkland Chapel at Camp Loughridge in Creek County, Oklahoma was named in honor of Rev. Bryant Kirkland and his service as senior minister at First Presbyterian Church in Tulsa.
