= Jaydee (disambiguation) =

Jaydee is a Dutch house music producer and DJ.

Jaydee or Jay Dee may also refer to:

== People ==
- Jaydee Bixby (born 1990), Canadian country musician
- JayDee Maness (born 1945), American country musician
- Jay Dee (1974–2006), alias of American record producer and rapper J Dilla
- Jay Dee (comedian) (born 1979), American stand-up comedian
- Jay Dee Daugherty (born 1952), American drummer and songwriter
- Jay Dee Patton (1907–1975), American college football player and lieutenant colonel in the U.S. Armed Forces
- Jay Dee Springbett (1975–2011), British-Australian record executive

== Watercraft ==
- Jay Dee (log canoe), a Chesapeake Bay log canoe
- USS Jaydee III (SP-692), a United States Navy patrol vessel
