= Robert Taylor (American artist) =

American painter (born 1951)

- Born: 1951 (age 74–75); Tulsa, Oklahoma, U.S.
- Education: Self-taught artist
- Notable work: Oklahoma lawmen Bass Reeves, Quanah Parker, and Bud Ledbetter mural in the Oklahoma Capitol
- Style: Symbolism and surrealism

Robert Taylor (born 1951) is an American self-taught artist from Oklahoma whose paintings explore Native American subject matter. He uses symbolism and manipulates figures' proportions, particularly hands and feet.

== Early life ==
Robert Taylor was born in Tulsa, Oklahoma, in 1951 and lived there his entire life, other than his time in the Navy starting in 1970. Although Taylor has sometimes been described as having Blackfoot, Cherokee, Osage, and Black Dutch ancestry; he is described by the Smithsonian National Museum of the American Indian as being "non-indian". His maternal grandfather exposed him to Native American cultures by taking him to powwows and his maternal uncle was a well-known wildlife painter.

Taylor graduated in 1969 from Will Rogers High School, where he played baseball and football. He went on a sports scholarship to Central Missouri State in Warrensburg, Missouri, for a short time until he was injured during the first semester. He dropped out of Central Missouri State to transfer to the University of Tulsa but was drafted before he completed the move. Taylor was in the Navy from 1970 to 1972. After he left the Navy, Taylor began pursuing art. He began with a more traditional style but was influenced by an exhibition of Paul Pletka's work as well as John Bigger.

== Style ==
Taylor's style is heavily influenced by that of Paul Pletka. Taylor used universal symbols in his paintings that express similar thoughts from various religious traditions. He also intentionally exaggerates the proportions of hands and feet in his paintings of turn-of-the-century Indians. The enlarged hands symbolize dexterous minds as well as the elevation of the human species among all others. Enlarged feet symbolize that we are bound to the earth physically while our dreams and aspirations are spiritual. He works primarily with watercolors, acrylics, pen and ink, and prints.

Taylor's definition of art is open-ended. He considers himself "a doormaker". If he "decorate[s] the door right, someone will stop and open it. Where it leads them is what art is, not what [he] constructed."

== Exhibitions and awards ==
Some of the numerous shows in which Taylor has exhibited and won awards for his work include:

- Trail of Tears Art Show at the Cherokee National Museum
- Five Civilized Tribes Museum
- Gallup Inter-Tribal Indian Ceremonial
- Trail of Tears State Park Gallery
- Los Angeles International Contemporary Art Fair
- Red Earth Festival
- International Art Festival
- Smithsonian Institution

His artwork is also featured in numerous public and private art collections.
