= J. M. Hall =

James Monroe Hall
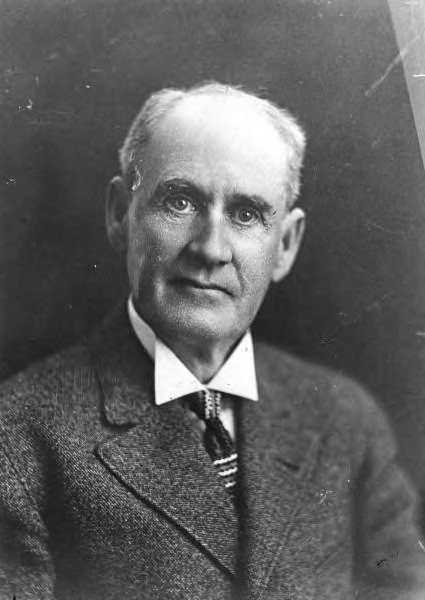
- J. M. Hall, undated photo
- Born: James Monroe Hall; April 12, 1851; Marshall County, Tennessee
- Died: May 26, 1935 (aged 84); Tulsa, Oklahoma
- Other names: J. M. Hall, James M. Hall
- Occupation(s): Merchant, civic leader

James Monroe Hall (1851–1935) came to the town of Tulsa in what was then known as Indian Territory. James and his brother, Harry C. Hall, operated a tent store that had followed the route of the Atlantic and Pacific Railroad and selected the site where the road would stop at Tulsa. They initially selected a site where the railroad crossed what would become Lewis Avenue and pitched a tent for the store there. This location was just inside the boundary of the Cherokee nation. When the Halls discovered that the Creek Nation had less restrictions on the activities of white merchants, they moved the store a couple of miles west to what would become First Street and erected a more permanent wooden building.

== Early life ==
James Hall (often called J. M.) was born on a farm in Marshall County, Tennessee, near the town of Belfast, on December 4, 1851. He graduated from Union Academy in Marshall County, Tennessee when he was seventeen years old.

Hall moved to Oswego, Kansas about 1868, and then moved to a site near McAlester, Indian Territory in 1874. There, he was in charge of a general store connected to a coal mining company. He also married his first wife, Lula Pigg, with whom he had three children: Juanita, Lena and Hugh. J. M. remained in McAlester for three years until the store was sold, then returned to Oswego and entered the grocery business until January, 1882. He then moved to Vinita, in Indian Territory, where he operated a store that sold supplies to men working on the Atlantic and Pacific Railroad.

== Move to Tulsa ==
The railroad extended its trackage from Vinita toward the Arkansas River. Hall moved his tent store along with the railroad as it moved southwest from Vinita. The railroad had intended to stop just inside the western boundary of Cherokee territory. However, Hall learned that the Creek tribe, whose lands were just west of the Cherokee, had more favorable trade laws. He and his brother Harry, who was then a railroad contractor, persuaded the railroad management to move the station two miles farther west, to a small Creek village called Tulsa. The Halls set up the tent store there in August 1882. Although the railroad crews continued to move westward across the Arkansas, the Halls decided to remain in Tulsa.

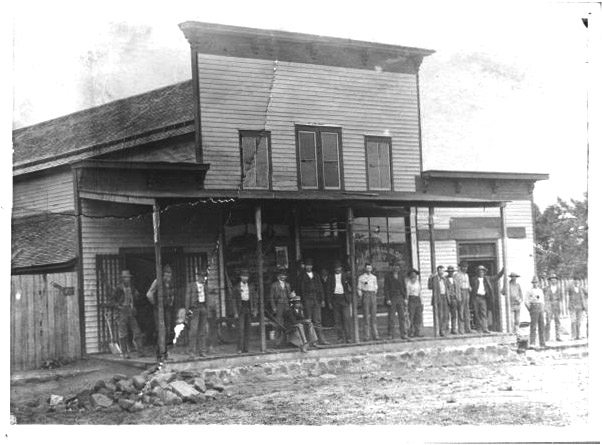
J. M. Hall & Co. Store, Tulsa, Indian Territory (now Oklahoma) in 1890

J. M. replaced the tent with a permanent structure at what would be named First Street and Main Street, just south of the railroad tracks. According to his obituary in the Tulsa World, the one-story building was 25 feet by 50 feet, with a 16-foot lean-to on the north side and a 12-foot lean-to on the south side. Later, J. M. added a second story and enclosed the property with a fence. Still later, he replaced the original building with a two-story brick building that was known for many years after as the Hall Building. J. M. and Harry operated the store until Harry died in March, 1906. J. M. continued to operate the store until 1908, when he sold out to pursue banking and other interests.

After coming to Tulsa, J. M. married Jennie Stringfield, a Presbyterian missionary. They had two children:Kathryn and Harry.

== Impact on Tulsa ==
Rev. Robert McGill Loughridge, preached the first sermon in 1883 on the porch of the Hall store. Hall, a devout Presbyterian, has been credited with organizing First Presbyterian Church of Tulsa, the first permanent Protestant church in Tulsa, which began meeting at the store in 1885. The first ministers at this church were itinerant Presbyterian missionaries, whose salaries were paid by their denomination, the Presbyterian Church of the United States of America (PCUSA). Hall then organized a Sunday School, spending the next forty years as its superintendent. He also organized a group of citizens to erect a structure that would serve as both a school and a church. The Presbyterian Church sent two missionary teachers and a minister, Rev. William Haworth, to staff the school. Haworth would serve until Charles William Kerr arrived in 1900 as the first permanent Presbyterian minister in Tulsa.

In 1889, J. M. Hall, Jay Forsythe, R. M. Bynum and Joe Price bought the site occupied by the Presbyterian Mission Day School from the Presbyterian Board for $1,050. They held the title until Tulsa was incorporated, then deeded the property to Tulsa for use as a school. In 1906, the mission building was razed and the property became the site of Tulsa High School.

Hall was one of the organizers of the Commercial Club in 1902. This club was a forerunner of the Tulsa Chamber of Commerce. He served as club president in 1904. He was also one of the club members who put together a successful bid in 1907 to move Henry Kendall College from Muskogee to Tulsa. Hall remained an active member of the club until 1932, when he was granted an honorary life membership. Hall also served on the Board of Trustees for 25 years, even after Kendall College became the University of Tulsa in 1920.

== Death ==
James M. Hall died at his home, 1801 Admiral Boulevard in Tulsa, on May 26, 1935. Funeral services at the First Presbyterian Church were conducted by Charles William Kerr, the first permanent minister of that church. Hall was survived by his widow, three daughters and a son. Hall is buried in Rose Hill Cemetery. His tombstone bears the inscription "Father of Tulsa."
