= Dallas Keuchel =

American baseball player (born 1988)

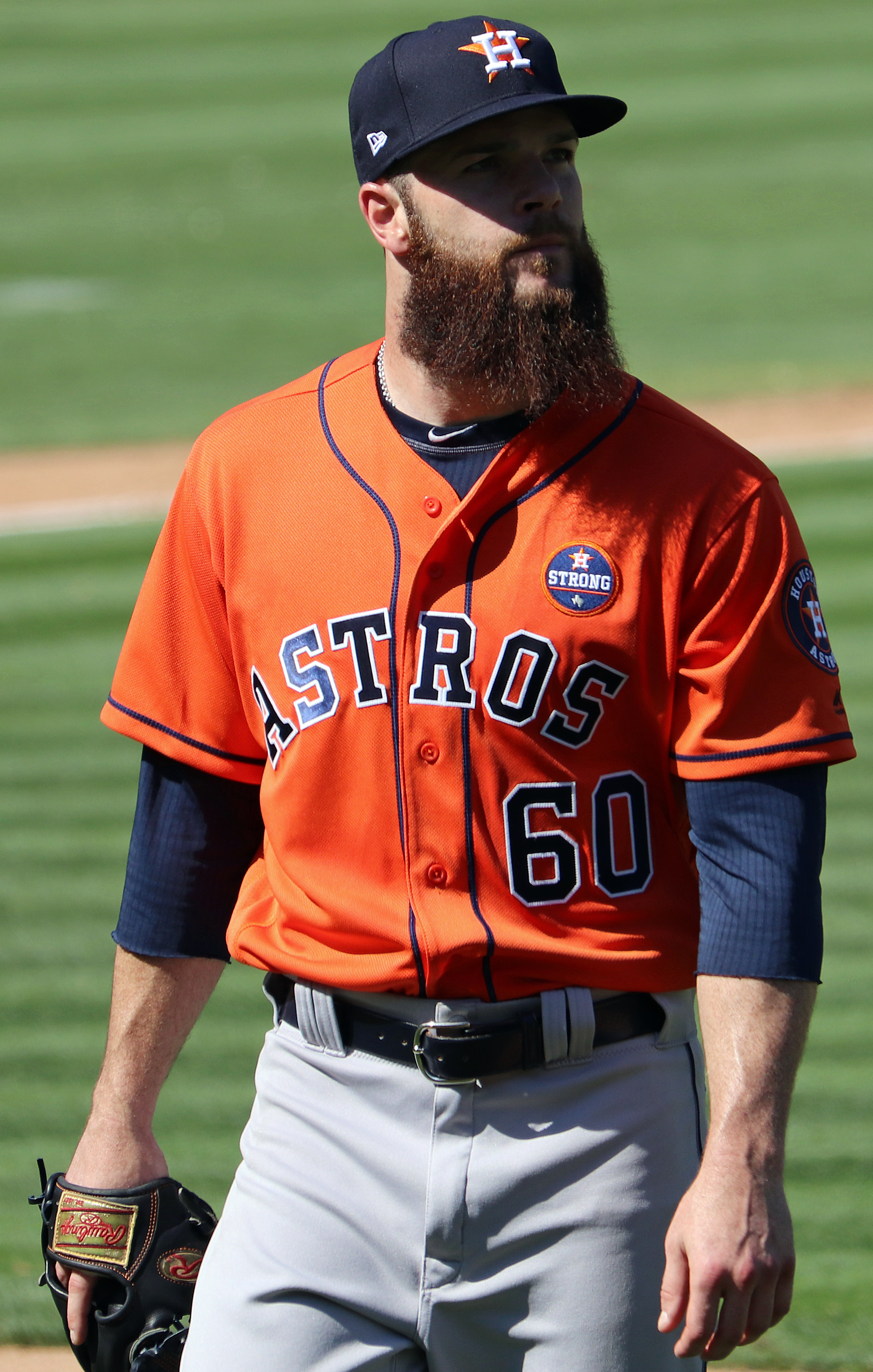
- Keuchel with the Houston Astros in 2017

Free agent
- Pitcher
- Born: January 1, 1988 (age 38); Tulsa, Oklahoma, U.S.
- Bats: Left Throws: Left

Professional debut
- MLB: June 17, 2012, for the Houston Astros
- NPB: August 17, 2024, for the Chiba Lotte Marines

MLB statistics (through 2024 season)
- Win–loss record: 103–92
- Earned run average: 4.03
- Strikeouts: 1,252

NPB statistics (through 2024 season)
- Win–loss record: 2–4
- Earned run average: 3.60
- Strikeouts: 29
- Stats at Baseball Reference

Teams
- Houston Astros (2012–2018); Atlanta Braves (2019); Chicago White Sox (2020–2022); Arizona Diamondbacks (2022); Texas Rangers (2022); Minnesota Twins (2023); Milwaukee Brewers (2024); Chiba Lotte Marines (2024)

Career highlights and awards
- 2× All-Star (2015, 2017); World Series champion (2017); AL Cy Young Award (2015); 5× Gold Glove Award (2014–2016, 2018, 2021); AL wins leader (2015)

Dallas Keuchel (/ˈkaɪkəl/, KY-kəl; born January 1, 1988) is an American professional baseball pitcher who is a free agent. He has previously played in Major League Baseball (MLB) for the Houston Astros, Atlanta Braves, Chicago White Sox, Arizona Diamondbacks, Texas Rangers, Minnesota Twins, and Milwaukee Brewers, and in Nippon Professional Baseball (NPB) for the Chiba Lotte Marines.

Keuchel attended the University of Arkansas, where he played baseball for the Arkansas Razorbacks. Keuchel made his MLB debut in 2012. In 2014, he was awarded both the Gold Glove Award and the Fielding Bible Award. Keuchel was named the starting pitcher for the American League in the 2015 MLB All-Star Game. Following the 2015 season, he won the American League Cy Young Award along with his second Gold Glove and Fielding Bible Awards. Keuchel was a member of the World Series champion 2017 Houston Astros. He played for the Atlanta Braves in 2019 and signed a three-year contract with the Chicago White Sox before the 2020 season. The White Sox designated Keuchel for assignment and subsequently released him in May 2022. Later in the year he was signed first by the Arizona Diamondbacks and then by the Texas Rangers, both of which later designated him for assignment. He is a two-time All-Star and a five-time Gold Glove winner.

== Early life ==
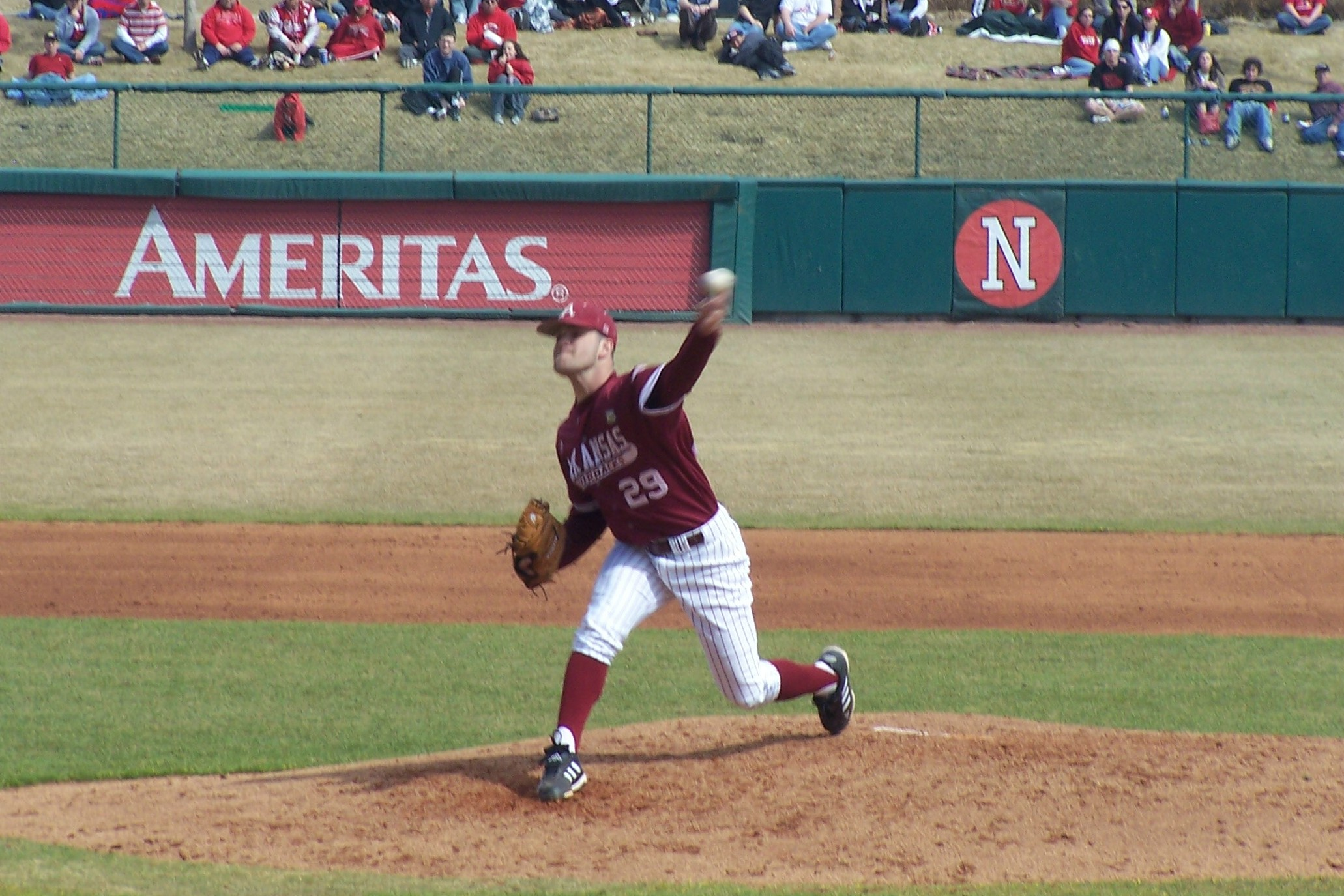
Keuchel pitching for the Arkansas Razorbacks

Keuchel attended Bishop Kelley High School in Tulsa, Oklahoma, where he led the baseball team to the state championship.

== College career ==
Keuchel then attended the University of Arkansas, where he played college baseball for the Arkansas Razorbacks baseball team. He registered a 5.88 earned run average (ERA) as a freshman, a 4.58 ERA as a sophomore, and a 3.92 ERA as a junior. In 2007 and 2008, he played collegiate summer baseball for the Wareham Gatemen of the Cape Cod Baseball League and was a league all-star in 2008.

During the 2009 season, Keuchel led the Razorbacks as the Friday-night ace. The final regular season series was against Drew Pomeranz and #9 Ole Miss at Baum Stadium. The Razorbacks committed four errors in Keuchel's last regular season start, and he was tagged with the loss, ending the regular season with a 7–3 record. However, Keuchel led the Arkansas pitching staff to the 2009 College World Series in Omaha. Arkansas finished the CWS 3rd nationally that season.

== Professional career ==
=== Draft and minor leagues ===
After his junior year at Arkansas, the Houston Astros selected Keuchel in the seventh round of the 2009 Major League Baseball (MLB) draft. He signed with the Astros and began his professional career with the Tri-City ValleyCats of the Low–A New York–Penn League, where he had a 2.70 ERA. He began the 2010 season with the Lancaster JetHawks of the High–A California League. After posting a 3.36 ERA, the Astros promoted him to the Corpus Christi Hooks of the Double–A Texas League in July, where he had a 4.70 ERA for the remainder of the season. He began the 2011 season with Corpus Christi, and after pitching to a 3.17 ERA, received a promotion to the Oklahoma City RedHawks of the Triple–A Pacific Coast League, where he struggled with a 7.50 ERA.

Keuchel began the 2012 season with Oklahoma City.

=== Houston Astros (2012–2018) ===
==== 2012–14 ====
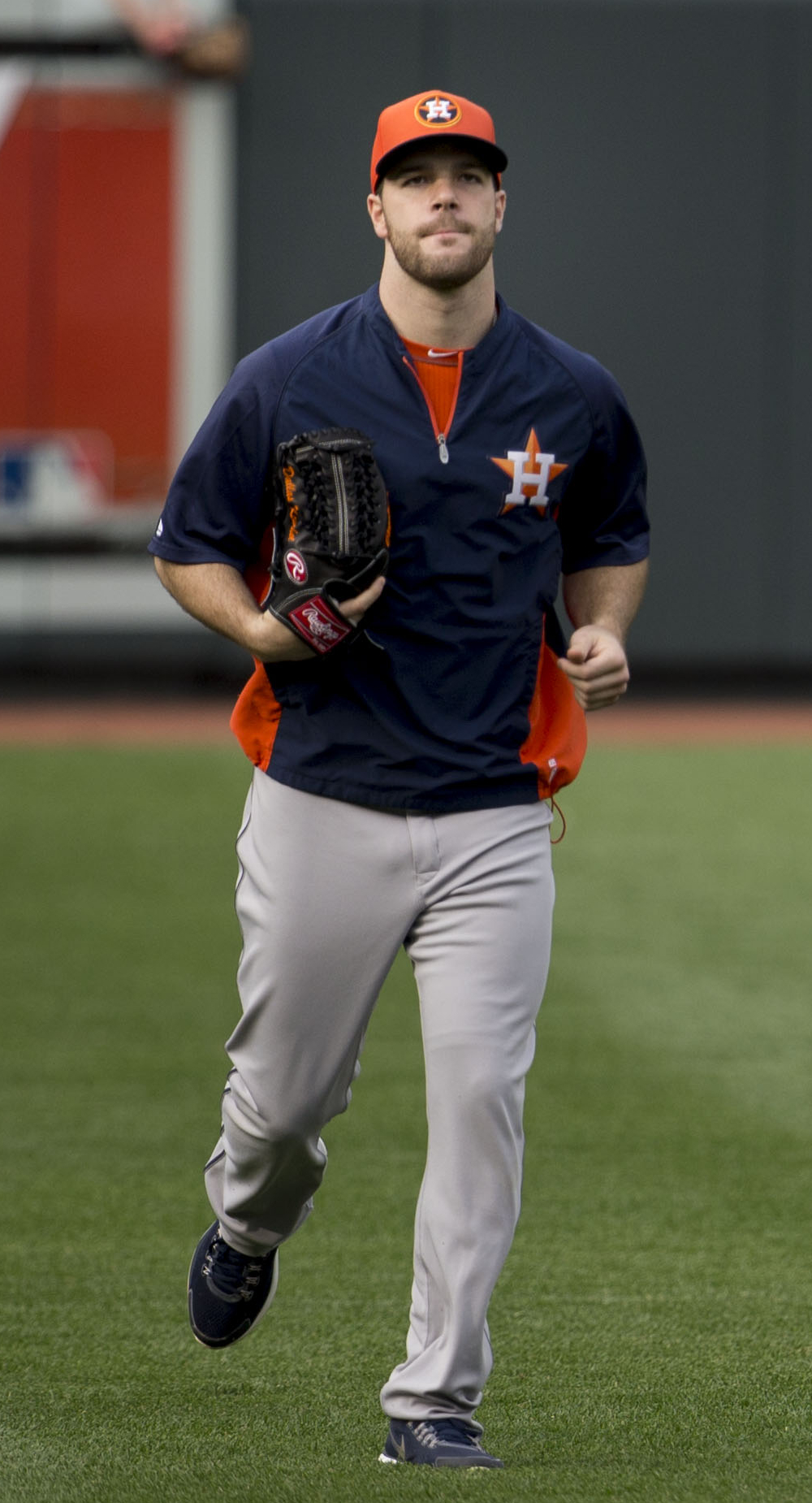
Keuchel with the Houston Astros in 2013

Keuchel made his MLB debut on June 17, 2012 against the Texas Rangers. He threw a complete game in his second start. Keuchel finished the 2012 season with a 5.27 ERA in 16 games started, while allowing more walks (39) than strikeouts (38). He pitched to a 5.15 ERA in the 2013 season.

In 2014, Keuchel had a 9–5 win–loss record and a 3.20 ERA at the All-Star break, and was a finalist for the final American League (AL) roster spot in the 2014 MLB All-Star Game. He finished the season with a 12–9 record and a 2.93 ERA. For his defense, Keuchel won both the Gold Glove Award and Fielding Bible Award.

==== 2015: Cy Young Award ====
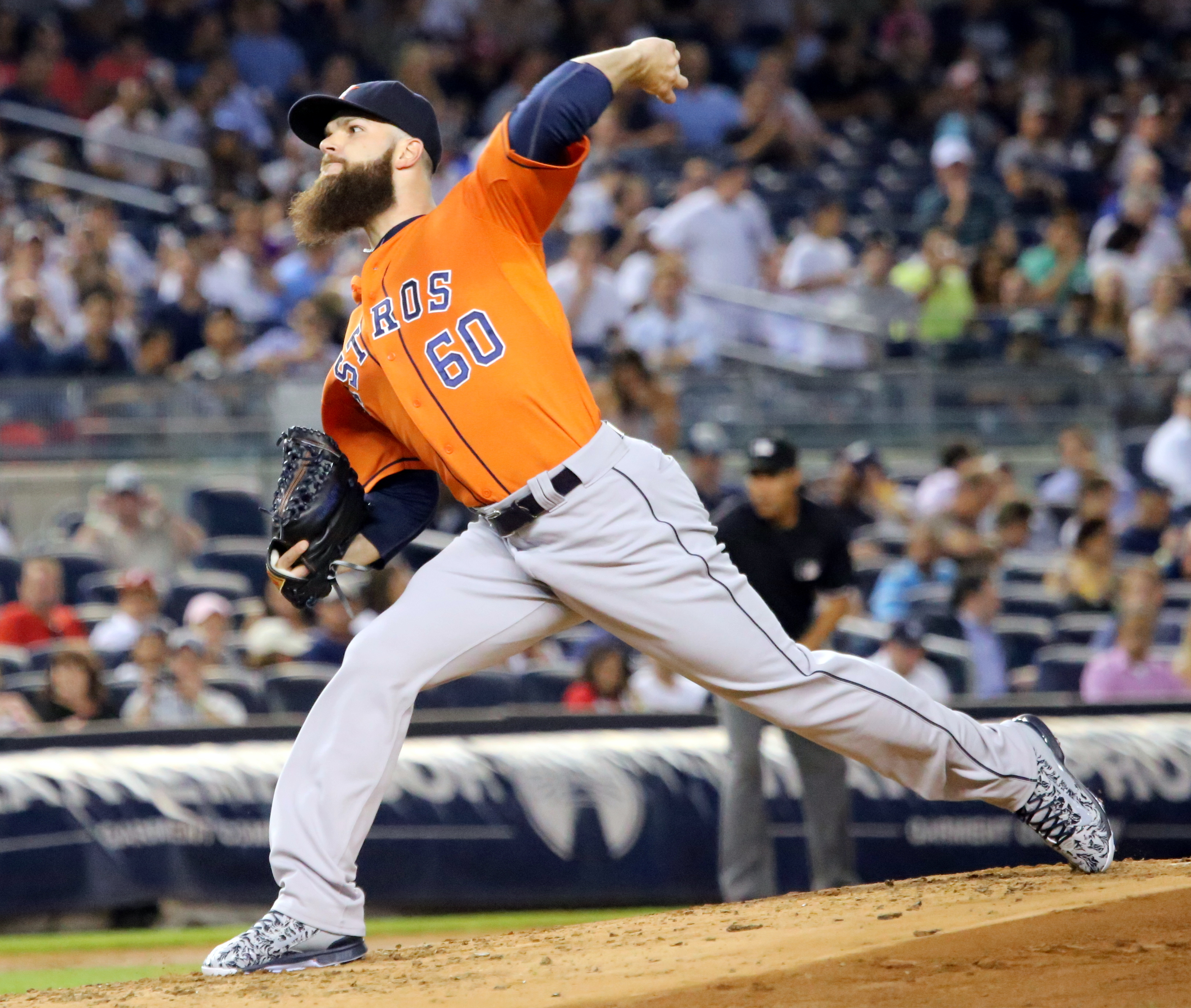
Keuchel pitching in 2015

In April 2015, Keuchel pitched to a 3–0 record and a 0.73 ERA in five games started. He was named the AL's Pitcher of the Month for April 2015. He was honored as the AL Pitcher of the Month for May 2015, in which he pitched to a 4–1 record and a 2.62 ERA in six starts. Keuchel was selected for the AL roster in the 2015 MLB All-Star Game, and was chosen as the AL's starting pitcher.

On August 1, Keuchel yielded two runs on two hits over six innings and struck out 8 to move to 13–5. It was Keuchel's 33rd consecutive games going at least 6 innings, which set a franchise record. He won his third AL Pitcher of the Month Award for August, after pitching to a 4–1 record and a 1.94 ERA in six starts.

On September 27, Keuchel established the club record for strikeouts for a left-hander when he fanned Mike Napoli in the first inning, one of 10 strikeouts versus Texas to pass Mike Cuellar, who had 203 for Houston in 1967.

With a 15–0 record and 1.46 ERA at Minute Maid Park, Keuchel established the major league record for most victories at home while remaining undefeated there in one season. Prior to Keuchel, rotations mates Dave Ferriss and Tex Hughson shared the record while with the 1946 Boston Red Sox, each going 13–0 at Fenway Park. Keuchel's ERA was also the lowest home ERA by an AL pitcher since Nolan Ryan surrendered just a 1.07 figure for the 1972 California Angels.

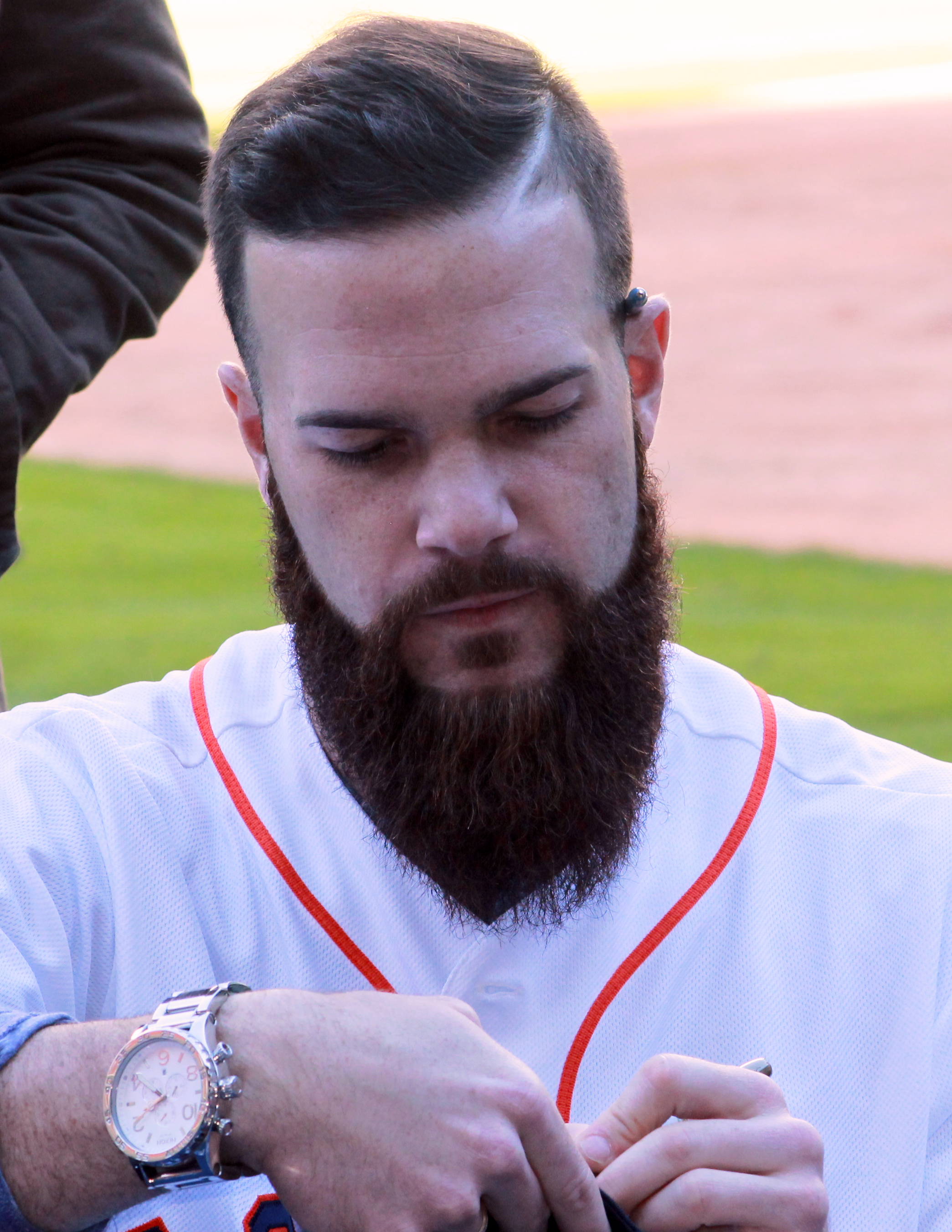
Keuchel in January, 2015

Keuchel's overall record for the year was 20–8, and he had a 2.48 ERA and 216 strikeouts. Among major league pitchers, he gave up the lowest percentage of hard-hit balls (21.3%). He threw 3,492 pitches, more than any other major league pitcher.

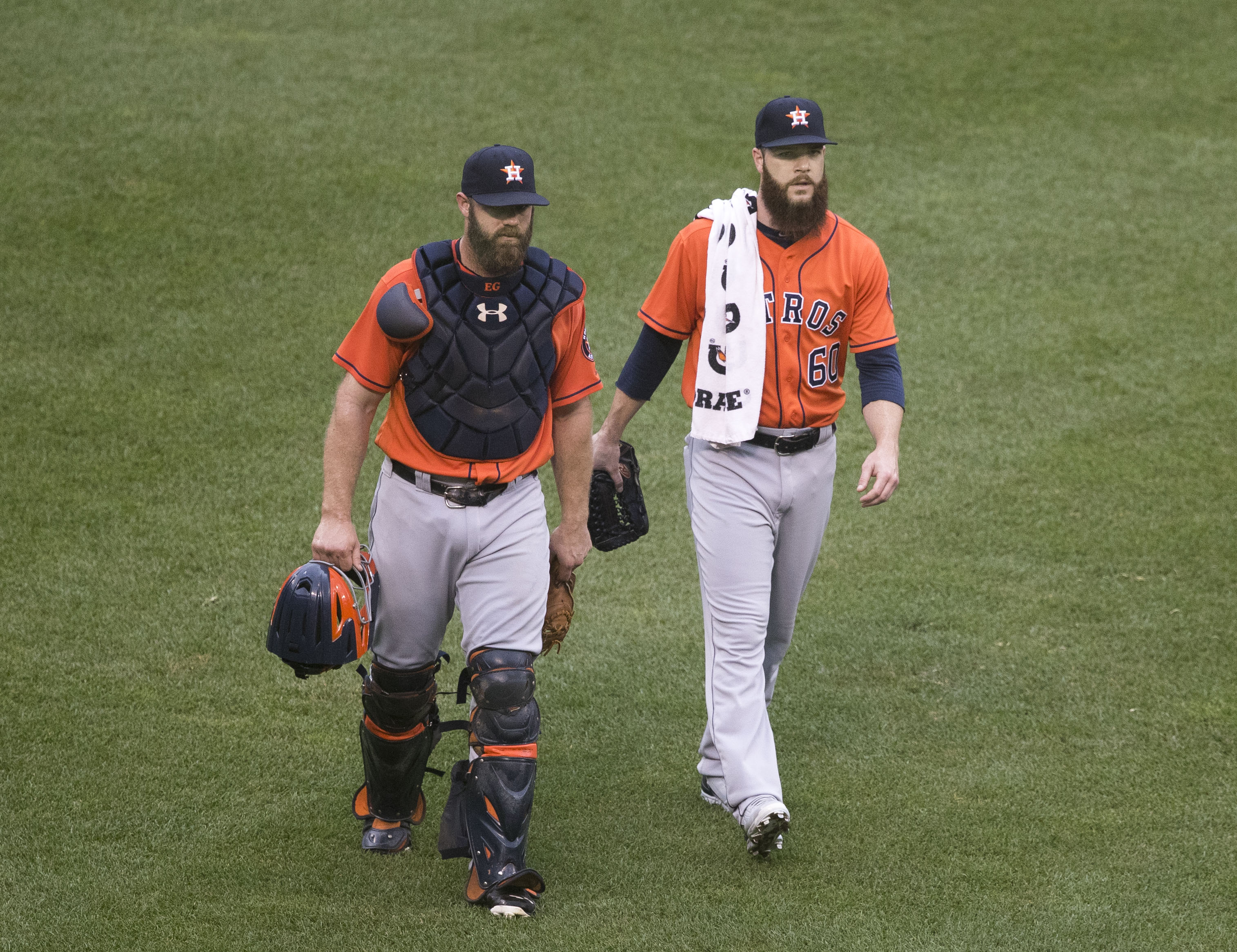
Keuchel with catcher Evan Gattis in 2016.

Keuchel started and won the AL Wild Card Game versus the New York Yankees on three days' rest. On October 11, he followed up by beating the Kansas City Royals, 4–2, in Game 3 of the AL Divisional Series (ALDS) while remaining undefeated at home in 2015 and move the Astros within one game of advancing. In Game 5, Keuchel was brought in for a relief appearance on just two days of rest in the 8th inning; however, he surrendered a three-run home run as the Royals extended their lead to 7–2, which they held on to win the game and the series. Following the season, Keuchel won the Cy Young Award, the Gold Glove Award, the Fielding Bible Award, and the Warren Spahn Award, given to the best left-handed pitcher in MLB. Keuchel became the third Astro to win a Cy Young Award.

==== 2016 ====
In 2016, Keuchel won another Gold Glove Award, but he went 9–12 with a 4.55 ERA and a 1.286 WHIP in 26 games pitched and 168 innings. In September, Keuchel missed starts due to inflammation in his left shoulder. He later admitted that he had pitched through shoulder discomfort throughout the 2016 season.

==== 2017 ====
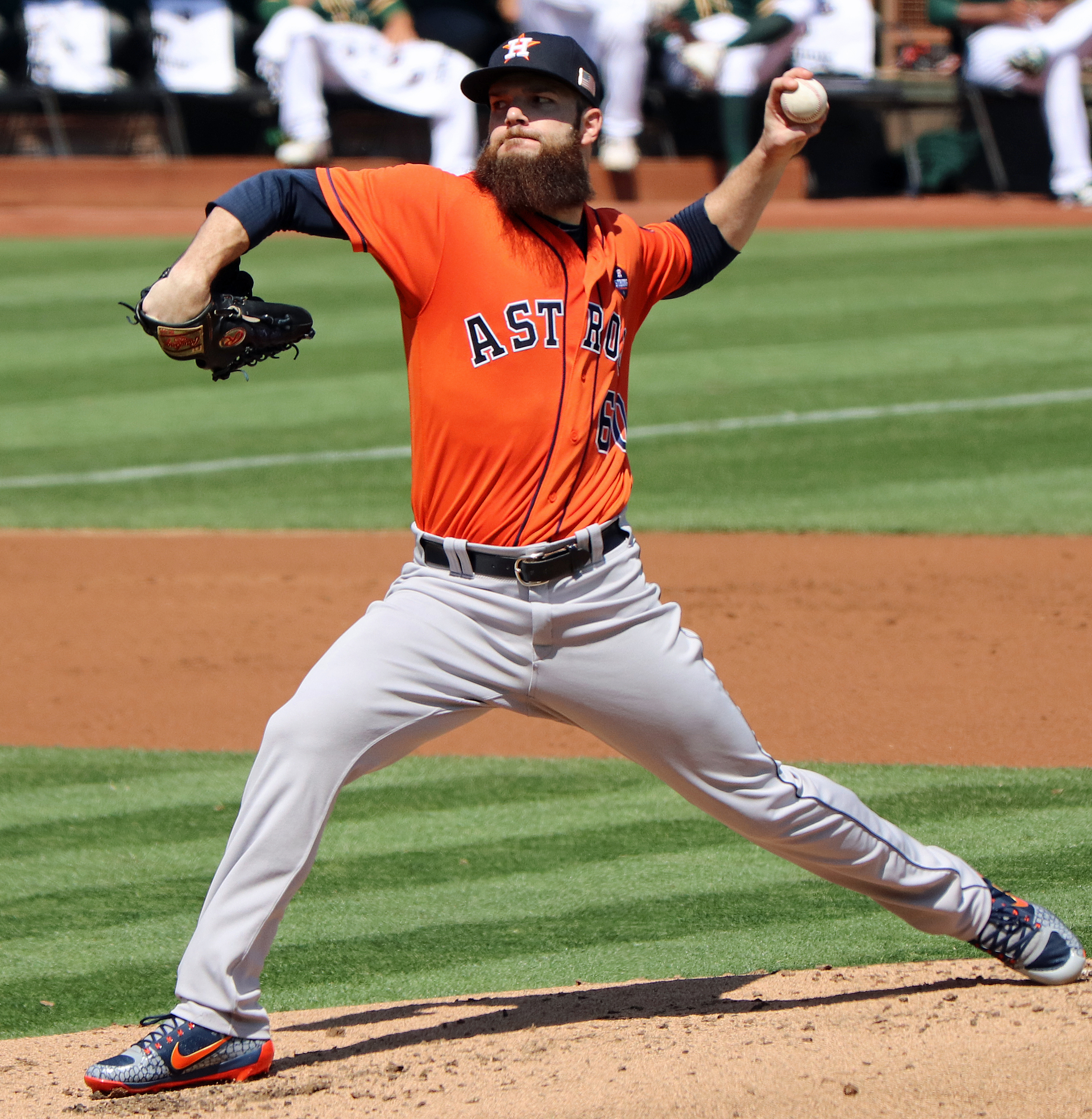
Dallas Keuchel pitching at the Oakland Coliseum, September 10, 2017

Keuchel began the 2017 season by winning his fourth career AL Pitcher of the Month Award in April, after posting a 5–0 W–L and 1.21 ERA over six starts. He allowed six runs over 44 2/3 IP. He became the first Astros pitcher to win four; J. R. Richard was the other Astros pitcher who had won three. He proceeded to start the season with a 7–0 record and a 1.84 ERA; however, on May 20, 2017, he was placed on the 10-day disabled list due to a pinched nerve in his neck. On June 8, 2017, Keuchel was again placed on the disabled list due to continuing neck woes. He was selected to play in the All-Star Game, held at Marlins Park in Miami. It was his second career selection.

Keuchel finished 2017 making 23 starts with a 14–5 record and a 2.90 ERA. The Astros won the American League West division with a 101–61 record to reach the postseason for the second time in three seasons. In the 2017 American League Division Series, the Astros faced the Boston Red Sox, and Keuchel started Game 2. He pitched 5 2/3 innings while allowing one run on three hits with seven strikeouts as Houston won 8–2 before winning the series two games later.

Keuchel started Game 1 of the 2017 American League Championship Series against the New York Yankees, which resulted in seven scoreless innings while allowing just four hits with ten strikeouts in a 2–1 victory. He started Game 5 five days later, but he lasted just 4 2/3 innings while allowing four runs on seven hits in a 5–0 loss. However, the Astros won the pennant a couple of days later to advance to their first World Series in twelve years.

In the 2017 World Series, Keuchel was tapped to start Game 1; he allowed three runs on six hits in 6 2/3 innings of work that saw him take the loss in a 3–1 result. He pitched once more in Game 5, which saw him last just 3 2/3 innings and allow four runs on five hits, but the Astros battled in a classic back-and-forth game that saw them win 13–12 in ten innings. The Astros won the series days later to give Keuchel a World Series ring; he went 2–2 in the 2017 postseason.

Three years later, it was revealed in the Houston Astros sign stealing scandal that the Astros had broken MLB rules during the 2017 season. Keuchel subsequently apologized for his role in the scandal.

==== 2018 ====
In 2018, Keuchel compiled a 12–11 record with a 3.74 ERA in a career-high 34 starts. He had the highest ground ball percentage among major league pitchers (53.7%), and the lowest fly ball percentage (24.4%). He also won his fourth Gold Glove. He became a free agent after the 2018 season.

=== Atlanta Braves (2019) ===
On June 7, 2019, Keuchel signed a one-year contract with the Atlanta Braves worth $13 million. He made his first start on June 21. Over 19 starts for the year, Keuchel went 8–8 with a 3.75 ERA, striking out 91 over 112 2/3 innings.

=== Chicago White Sox (2020–2022) ===
On December 30, 2019, the Chicago White Sox signed Keuchel to a three-year, $55.5 million contract. He made his White Sox debut on July 25, 2020, picking up a win over the Minnesota Twins. In the 2020 season, he was 6–2 with a 1.99 ERA. He led the AL in fewest home runs per 9 IP (0.284), and in fewest strikeouts per nine innings (6.0).

Keuchel struggled in 2021, compiling a 9–9 record and an ERA of 5.28 in 30 starts. He gave up 189 hits and 105 runs in 162 innings and struck out 95 batters, striking out fewer batters per 9 innings (5.28) than any other pitcher in the major leagues. However, he did receive his fifth Gold Glove Award. During the second half of the season, his ERA was 6.82 and he struggled with a back injury.

In 2022, Keuchel had a 7.88 ERA for the White Sox in eight games started. On May 28, the White Sox designated Keuchel for assignment. He was released on May 30.

=== Arizona Diamondbacks (2022) ===
Keuchel signed a minor league contract with the Arizona Diamondbacks on June 6, 2022. Keuchel started two games for the Arizona Complex League Diamondbacks before the Diamondbacks promoted him to the major leagues on June 26. On July 20, 2022, the Diamondbacks designated him for assignment, clearing waivers and making him a free agent. In his short span with Arizona, Keuchel compiled a 9.68 ERA for the team in four games started.

=== Texas Rangers (2022) ===
On July 25, 2022, Keuchel signed a minor league contract with the Texas Rangers. He was added to the Rangers' taxi squad on August 26. Keuchel made his Rangers debut on August 27, giving up 7 earned runs over 5.1 innings pitched in a blowout 11–2 loss to the Detroit Tigers. He was designated for assignment on September 5 after posting a 12.60 ERA across 10 innings. He was released by the Rangers organization the same day.

=== Minnesota Twins (2023) ===
On June 22, 2023, Keuchel signed a minor league contract with the Minnesota Twins organization. The Twins assigned him to the St. Paul Saints of the Triple–A International League. On July 21, Keuchel bypassed an opt–out clause in his deal to remain with the Twins. In 6 starts for St. Paul, he registered a 1.13 ERA with 28 strikeouts across 32.0 innings of work. On August 1, Keuchel exercised a second opt–out in his deal, and was selected to the major league roster two days later following an injury to Joe Ryan. On August 6, Keuchel made his debut with Minnesota, going five innings allowing eight hits, two walks, and one earned run. On August 20, he threw 6 1/3 perfect innings in a start against the Pittsburgh Pirates. He became a free agent following the season.

=== Seattle Mariners (2024) ===
On April 2, 2024, Keuchel signed a minor league contract with the Seattle Mariners. Keuchel was released by the Mariners on May 20, but subsequently re–signed with the organization on a new minor league contract three days later.

=== Milwaukee Brewers (2024) ===
On June 25, 2024, the Mariners traded Keuchel to the Milwaukee Brewers in exchange for cash considerations. The next day, the Brewers purchased his contract and added him to their major league roster. In four starts with Milwaukee, he registered a 5.40 ERA, allowing ten runs in 16 2/3 innings. Keuchel was designated for assignment on July 14. On July 17, he cleared waivers and elected free agency in lieu of an outright assignment.

=== Chiba Lotte Marines (2024) ===
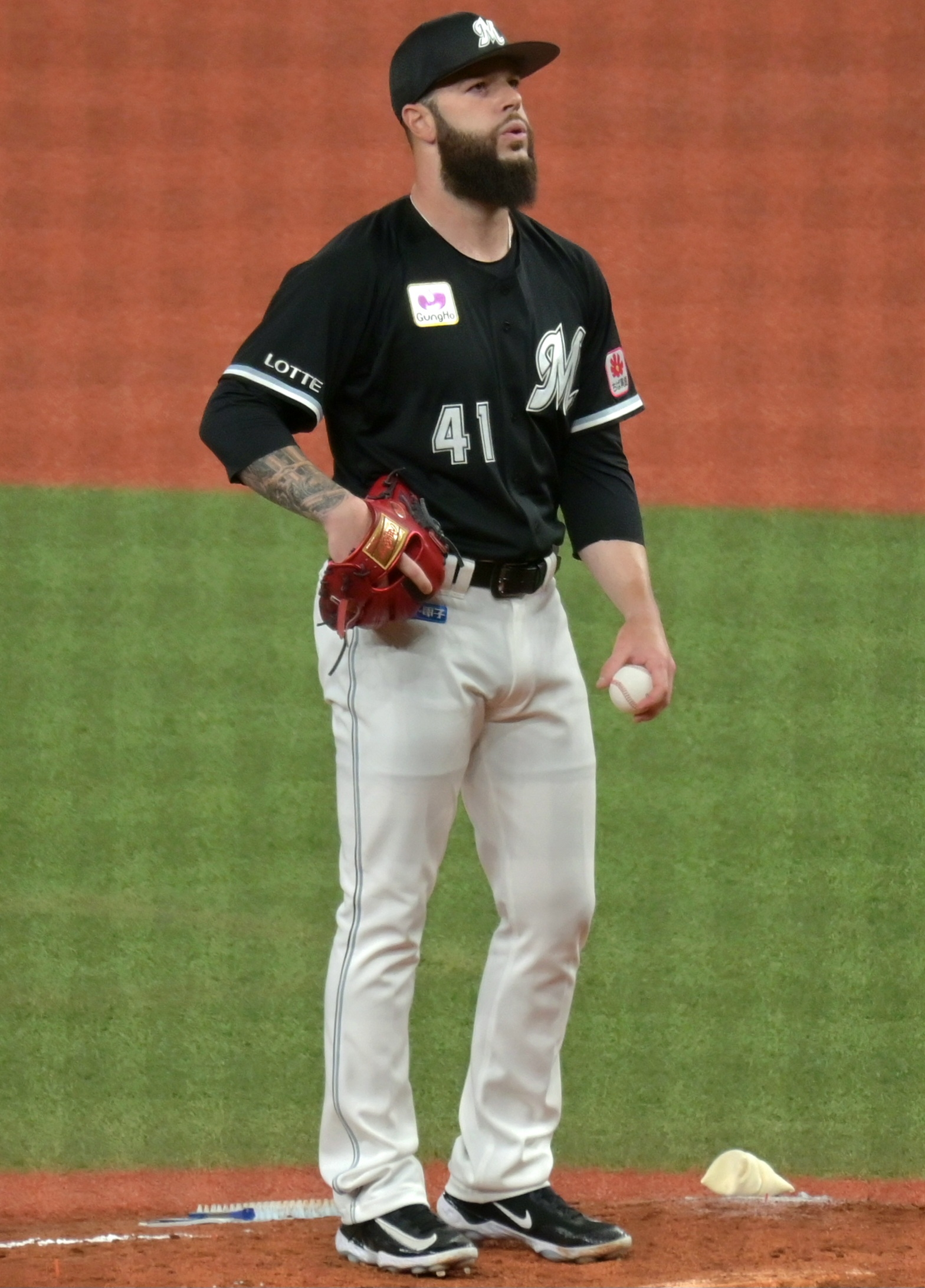
Keuchel with the Chiba Lotte Marines in 2024

On July 30, 2024, Keuchel signed a contract with the Chiba Lotte Marines of Nippon Professional Baseball. He made eight appearances for the Marines, compiling a 2-4 record and 3.60 ERA with 29 strikeouts over 40 innings of work. Keuchel became a free agent following the season.

=== Kansas City Royals (2025) ===
On July 9, 2025, Keuchel signed a minor league contract with the Kansas City Royals, and was assigned to their Triple-A affiliate, the Omaha Storm Chasers. In seven starts for Omaha, he posted a 2-1 record and 3.53 ERA with 30 strikeouts across 35 2/3 innings pitched. Keuchel was released by the Royals organization on August 20.

=== Athletics ===
On July 25, 2026, Keuchel signed a minor league contract with the Athletics. In 7 starts with Triple-A Las Vegas Aviators he threw 25 innings going 0-2 with a 6.48 ERA and 20 strikeouts. He elected free agency on November 2.

== Pitching style ==
Keuchel throws five pitches: a four-seam fastball averaging 89 miles per hour (143 km/h), a sinker averaging 89 miles per hour (143 km/h), a cut fastball averaging 86 miles per hour (138 km/h), a slider averaging 79 miles per hour (127 km/h), and a changeup averaging 80 miles per hour (130 km/h). He had learned a slurve while in high school, which he did not use in college, as he relied on his sinker and changeup. Needing a breaking ball when he became a professional, he learned to throw a curveball. He did not succeed with the curveball in the major leagues, and he developed a slider, which helped his results. Keuchel's sinker and slider both induce more ground balls than average across the league.

== Personal life ==
Keuchel is the son of Dennis and Teresa Keuchel. He has an older sister, Krista. On March 9, 2021, Keuchel got engaged to MLB/NHL Network host, Kelly Nash. Keuchel and Nash were married on January 22, 2022.

After signing with the White Sox, Keuchel purchased a $2 million home in the Lake View neighborhood of Chicago. Keuchel is Catholic.

== See also ==
- Houston Astros award winners and league leaders
- List of Chicago White Sox award winners and league leaders
- List of Major League Baseball All-Star Game starting pitchers
- List of Major League Baseball annual shutout leaders
- List of people from Tulsa, Oklahoma
- List of University of Arkansas people
- List of World Series starting pitchers

Awards and achievements
Preceded by Corey Kluber; Scott Kazmir; Rick Porcello	American League Pitcher of the Month; April—May 2015; August 2015; April 2017	Succeeded by Chris Sale; Cody Anderson; Lance McCullers Jr.
