= Will Rogers High School =

Coordinates: 36.153833°N 95.933272°W

Will Rogers College Middle and High School
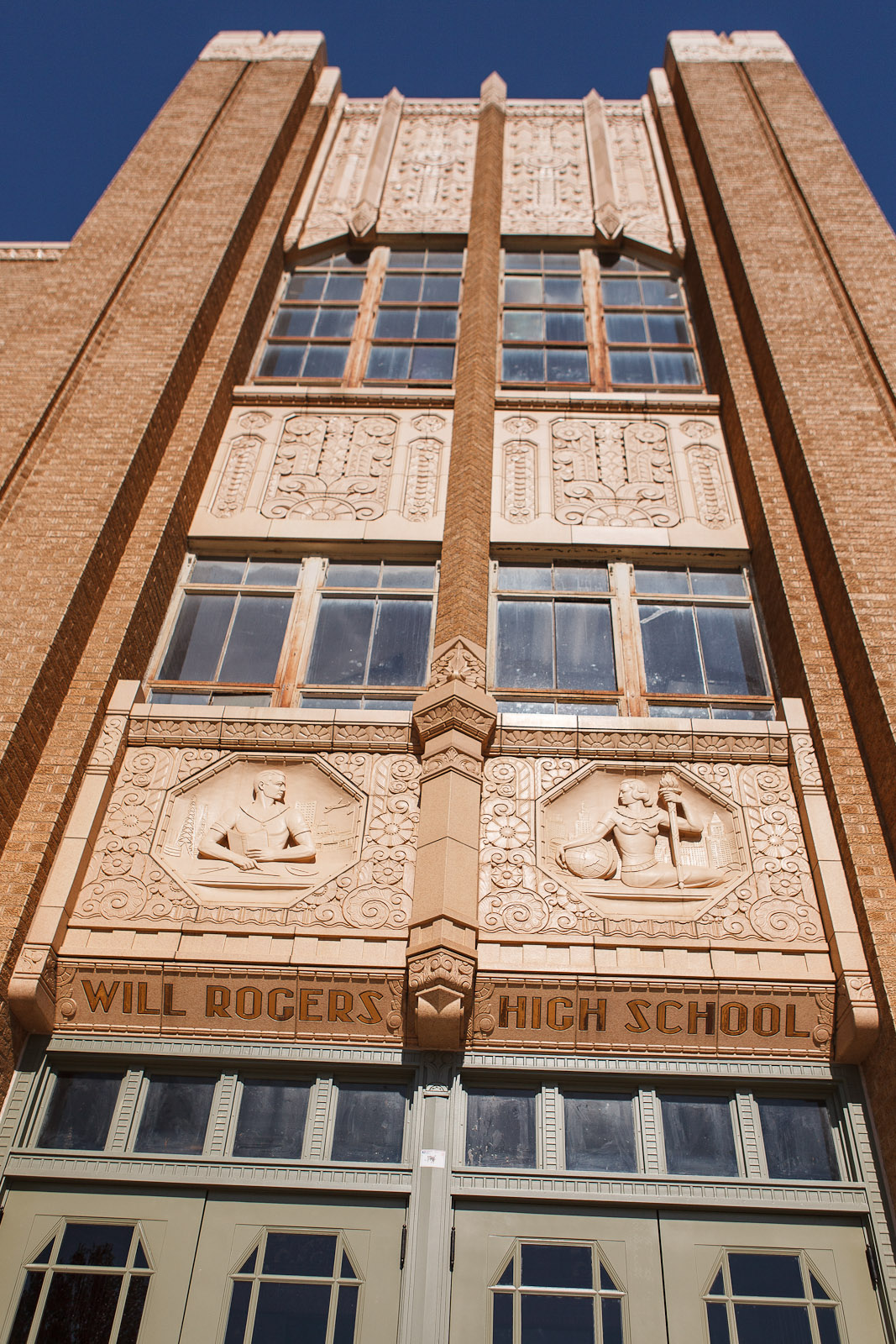

Location
- 3909 E. 5th Place; Tulsa, Oklahoma; United States

Information
- Type: Public
- Motto: "Will on the Hill"
- Established: 1939
- Faculty: 110 (2018/2019 school year)
- Enrollment: 1,037 (2023–2024)
- Colors: Royal blue and gold
- Mascot: Ropers
- Website: rogers.tulsaschools.org
- Will Rogers High School
- U.S. National Register of Historic Places
- Area: 3.3 acres (1.3 ha)
- Architect: Leon B. Senter, et. al.
- Architectural style: Art Deco
- NRHP reference No.: 07000918
- Added to NRHP: September 6, 2007

Will Rogers Middle and High School, located at 3909 E. 5th Place in Tulsa, Oklahoma, United States, was built by Tulsa Public Schools in 1939 using WPA workers and designed by Joseph R. Koberling, Jr. and Leon B. Senter. It was named for the humorist Will Rogers, who died in 1935, along with Wiley Post in a plane crash. Significant additions were made to the original structure in 1949 and 1964. The alterations were in keeping with the original design and did not detract from the school's architectural or historical significance. It has been called "... one of the best examples of Art Deco high school architecture... in the United States.

The school had approximately 1,000 students as of 2008, and more than 39,000 alumni.

== History ==
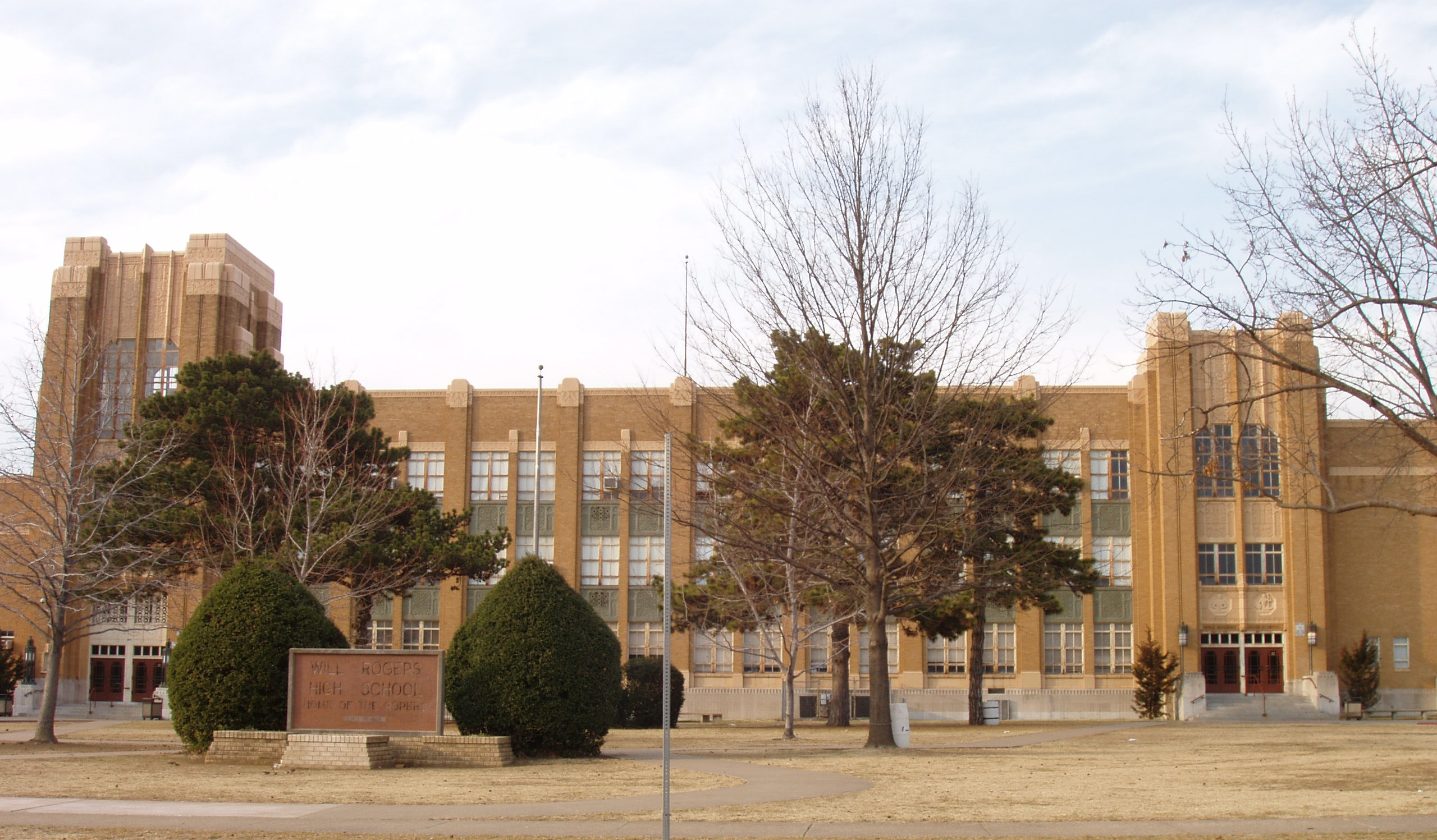
Will Rogers High School

The growth of the oil industry in Tulsa spurred a major population explosion that created a huge demand for homes and schools through the 1910s and 1920s. By 1920, Tulsa had built three senior high schools: Central in the downtown area, Booker T. Washington in North Tulsa and Clinton in West Tulsa. (Note: Central, constructed from 1917 to 1919, was designed to serve 2,500 students, but had an enrollment of 5,107 in the 1938/1939 school year.) The Board of Education had already realized the urgent need for two more such schools, one on the west side of Tulsa and the other on the east side. (Note: The westside school would be named Daniel Webster High School and the eastside school would be named for Will Rogers, who had died in 1935.)

The school board received a grant from the federal Public Works Administration for both the westside and eastside schools on October 22, 1936. This was the seed money that allowed the preparation of bids, which were opened in July, 1937.

The school occupies a 26.984 acres (10.920 ha) site within a residential area. In September, 1936, the Tulsa School District bought the tract in the southwestern quarter of Section 4, Township 19N, Range 13E from Mr. and Mrs. Fred Turner. It is bounded by East 4th Place South Street on the north, South Pittsburg Avenue on the east, East 5th Place South on the south, and Turner Park on the west.

The original 1939 building was constructed with a basement and three stories, and contained 200,000 sq. ft. of space. A 1949 addition to the east wing contained 21,016 square feet of space. An addition to the west wing in 1964 added four levels of classroom space.

In the 2008/09 school year, Rogers English teacher Brian Grimm was honored with the district's title of "teacher of the Year". Tulsa Public Schools has 83 schools and 3,300 teachers and staff.

The school's colors are royal blue and gold, the mascot is a Roper (i.e. a cowboy who specializes in using a rope to manage cattle) and the students are known as the Ropers. The school's symbol is based upon the dogiron (branding iron) used by the Rogers family.

On September 6, 2007, the Will Rogers High School building was added to the National Register of Historic Places with national significance. The National Park Service has stated that it is one of the best examples of Art Deco high school architecture in the United States.

In 2011, Tulsa Public Schools converted Will Rogers High School to a dual enrollment school. Students who complete the program at Rogers can earn up to 66 college units, the equivalent of an associate degree.

It has since been renamed "Will Rogers College Junior High and High School."

The student body consists of grades 6 through 12, eliminating the traditional middle school. The first graduating class after this change was in 2014.

== Tulsa Will Rogers High School Foundation ==
The school has a group of alumni who run the Tulsa Will Rogers High School Foundation, which provides grants and scholarships to Rogers faculty and students. The foundation was established in the 1990s and continues to this day.

== Notable alumni ==
- John Ashley (1934–1997), actor, producer and singer
- Charles Bell (1935–1995), artist
- Elvin Bishop, musician, blues-rock guitarist best known for the hit "Fooled Around and Fell in Love"
- Anita Bryant (1940–2024), singer, former Miss Oklahoma, famous as a television spokesperson for Florida orange juice, spearheaded opposition to a gay rights ordinance in Florida in 1977
- Phillip N. Butler (1938), U.S. Navy commander, naval aviator and the eighth-longest-held U.S. prisoner of war (POW) held in North Vietnam during the Vietnam War
- Don Chandler (1934–2011), professional American football player
- Paul Brooks Davis (1938), artist and graphic designer
- David Gates, singer and songwriter, best known as the lead singer of the group Bread
- Archie Goodwin (1937–1998), legendary comic book writer and editor, notably for DC, Warren and Marvel
- S. E. Hinton, novelist, wote The Outsiders in her junior year at Rogers; part of the novel takes place at Will Rogers High School
- Dave Hudgens, played for the University of Oklahoma, a 1978 third round draft pick of the Dallas Cowboys
- Lee Mayberry, NBA player, 1992 first round draft pick
- Russell Myers, cartoonist, created the comic strip Broom Hilda
- Dave Rader, WRHS class of 1975, NCAA college football coach,e coach of the University of Tulsa Golden Hurricane 1988–1999, offensive coordinator and quarterbacks coach for the University of Alabama Crimson Tide 2003–2006
- Leon Russell, musician; occasionally referred to as "The Master of Space and Time", a title he acquired around the time of his collaborations with Joe Cocker
- Gailard Sartain, actor and illustrator, played Dr. Mazeppa Pompazoidi on Dr. Mazeppa Pompazoidi's Uncanny Film Festival and Camp Meeting and later became a regular on Hee Haw; was featured in many Hollywood movies
- Alvin Setzepfandt, veterinarian and Minnesota state legislator
- Bob Smith, former NFL player
- Roy Staiger, former Major League Baseball third baseman with the New York Mets and New York Yankees
- Marquel Sutton, basketball player
- Robert Taylor, born 1951, native Tulsan, 1969 graduate of WRHS, self-taught Native American artist
- Bill Van Burkleo, former CFL player
- John Ward, former NFL player, played at Oklahoma State University and was a 1970 first round draft pick of the Minnesota Vikings
- Roger G. Wells (1940–2023), member of the New Hampshire House of Representatives
- Darryl Wren, former NFL player
