= John Ward (American football, born 1948) =

American football player (1948–2012)

No. 72, 73
- Positions: Center, Guard, Defensive end

Personal information
- Born: May 27, 1948; Enid, Oklahoma, U.S.
- Died: December 4, 2012 (aged 64); Oklahoma City, Oklahoma, U.S.
- Listed height: 6 ft 4 in (1.93 m)
- Listed weight: 258 lb (117 kg)

Career information
- High school: Will Rogers (Tulsa, Oklahoma)
- College: Oklahoma State (1966-1969)
- NFL draft: 1970: 1st round, 25th overall pick

Career history
- Minnesota Vikings (1970–1975); Chicago Bears (1976); Tampa Bay Buccaneers (1976)

Awards and highlights
- Consensus All-American (1969); First-team All-Big Eight (1969); Second-team All-Big Eight (1968)

Career NFL statistics
- Games played: 78
- Games started: 16
- Fumble recoveries: 1
- Stats at Pro Football Reference

John Henry Ward (May 27, 1948 – December 4, 2012) was an American professional football player who was a center, defensive end and guard in the National Football League (NFL) from 1970 to 1976 for the Minnesota Vikings, the Chicago Bears and the Tampa Bay Buccaneers. He played high school football at Will Rogers High School in Tulsa, Oklahoma, and college football for the Oklahoma State Cowboys and was the Vikings' first round pick in the 1970 NFL draft. Ward was also a wrestler at Oklahoma State, where he earned NCAA All-American honors in 1969. Ward died of cancer on December 4, 2012.
