= Wayne Henry Garrison =

American serial killer

- Born: Wayne Henry Garrison; August 26, 1959 (age 67); Tulsa, Oklahoma, U.S.
- Convictions: First degree murder Second degree manslaughter Insurance fraud
- Penalty: Death; commuted to life imprisonment

Details
- Victims: 3
- Span of crimes: 1972–1989
- Country: United States
- State: Oklahoma
- Date apprehended: October 22, 1999

Wayne Henry Garrison (born August 26, 1959) is an American serial killer who was convicted of killing three children. He was arrested in 1999 for the 1989 murder and dismemberment of 13-year-old Justin Wiles in Tulsa, Oklahoma. He was convicted and sentenced to death in 2001, although his sentence was commuted to life six years later.

== Early life ==
Garrison was born on August 26, 1959. He had a history of violence; he purposely killed his pet rabbit by breaking its neck just one day after getting it as a gift. The most notable occasion of Garrison's juvenile delinquency occurred on Halloween 1972, when he was 13 years old. He was at his uncle's house in Tulsa, Oklahoma. In the middle of the night, Garrison dragged his 4-year-old cousin Dana Dyane Dean into the crawlspace under the house, where he tied a felt headband around her neck and asphyxiated her until she was unresponsive. Dana's father, James, became worried during the early morning hours when he could not find Dana, and reported his daughter missing at around 7 a.m.. Police searched the home, and found Dana under the crawlspace, where she had died as a result of her injuries. It did not take long for police to arrest Garrison, and it did not take him long to confess.

A judge sent him to Griffin Memorial Hospital in Norman, Oklahoma. During 1974, Garrison was allowed a 10-day leave from the hospital. On May 29, 1974, he kidnapped 3-year-old Craig Neal, and suffocated him to death. He hid his body under an abandoned house, where it was found on June 3. Garrison was arrested shortly after, and charged with murder, but later pleaded guilty to a lesser charge, second degree manslaughter. He was sentenced to four years in prison. Garrison was released on March 9, 1977, at age 17. He returned to high school and graduated.

== Later life ==
Garrison later married and had one son. On June 20, 1989, Garrison abducted 13-year-old Justin Delbert Wiles, who lived five homes away from him. He dismembered the body and dumped the remains in Lake Bixhoma, where they were found four days later by a fisherman. Garrison quickly moved him and his family to Charlotte, North Carolina.

Garrison became the top suspect in the case after multiple witnesses identified him and his vehicle as the man who abducted Wiles, but there was not enough evidence to formally charge him. Garrison provided himself with an alibi at the time of Wiles' murder, saying to police that he was fishing, although in multiple interviews, he cited different lakes he was at. Garrison was however charged with insurance fraud in an unrelated case later on. On February 9, 1996, Garrison was arrested after giving a strong prescription of narcotics to an 11-year-old boy. He pleaded guilty in 1997 and was sent to prison.

=== Final arrest ===
In 1999, with his release date coming rapidly, Oklahoma investigators began to work tirelessly to find evidence to arrest Garrison for the murder of Justin Wiles. By this time, he was the only suspect in the case after other leads had run dry. While he was imprisoned, a bite mark on Garrison's body was collected as evidence. Shortly before his release from the Columbus Correctional Institution, Wiles' body was dug up for dental records, which matched with the bite mark on Garrison's body. Garrison was released on October 22, 1999, but was arrested just minutes later on a first degree murder charge.

== Criminal case ==
Garrison insisted he was innocent. He was extradited back to Oklahoma to be formally charged with the first degree murder of Justin Wiles. His attorneys asked the judge to again re-examine the body of Wiles for another teeth sample, but the request was denied. In August 2000, Garrison's lawyers cited an alternative suspect in Wiles' murder, that being George Kent Wallace, a suspected serial killer who was executed in Oklahoma for the murders of two teenage boys and who also confessed to murdering two others. However, Wallace was never suspected in the Wiles' case, and the case against Garrison moved on to a trial in 2001.

In November 2001, a jury deliberated for six hours before finding Garrison guilty of murder. His scheduled sentencing was delayed after he was admitted to an in-prison hospital. According to the official Tulsa radio station, Garrison had tried to kill himself. In January 2002, he was sentenced to death. His death sentence was later overturned on appeal. In 2007, Garrison accepted a deal in which he would have his death sentence thrown away if it meant he would waive his rights for a resentencing trial. Wiles' mother Dorothy Farrar said that Garrison being resentenced did not matter, as long as "he'll never hurt another child again". Garrison was resentenced to life imprisonment without a chance of parole.

== See also ==
- List of serial killers in the United States

== Bibliography ==
- Robert Keller (May 10, 2020). 50 American Serial Killers You've Probably Never Heard Of: Volume 9. ASIN B088FHR4L3.
