= Chris Dade =

American basketball player (born 1974)

Personal information
- Born: April 5, 1974 (age 52)
- Listed height: 6 ft 2 in (1.88 m)

Career information
- High school: Vista (Vista, California); San Diego El Camino (Oceanside, California)
- College: Cal State Fullerton (1994–1998)
- NBA draft: 1998: undrafted
- Playing career: 1998–2004
- Position: Guard

Career history
- 1998–1999: Hapoel Zfat
- 1999: Haukar
- 2000–2001: Hamar
- 2003–2004: Hamar

Career highlights
- Icelandic All-Star (2001)

Career Úrvalsdeild karla statistics
- Points: 1,220 (23.5 ppg)
- Rebounds: 256 (4.9 rpg)
- Assists: 126 (2.4 apg)

Chris Dade (born April 5, 1974) is an American former professional basketball player. He played college basketball for Cal State Fullerton and later professionally in Argentina, Iceland and Israel.

== Early life ==
Dade grew up in Tulsa, Oklahoma. Before his freshman year in high school, his family moved to the San Diego area where he attended Vista High School. He later transferred to San Diego El Camino High. He was the schools most valuable player as a junior. As a senior, he averaged 16.5 points, shot 58% from the field and led his team to the San Diego Section Division II championship with a 25–5 record. He was chosen player of the year in the division.

== College career ==
Dade played for Cal State Fullerton from 1994 to 1998. He redshirted his first year due to an injury.

== Professional career ==
In 1999, Dade signed with Úrvalsdeild karla club Haukar. He was released by the club in December 1999 after appearing in 10 games where he averaged 20.6 points and 5.9 rebounds per game.

The following season, Dade signed with Hamar. In January 2001, he was selected for the Icelandic Basketball Association All-Star Game where he scored 11 points. In February, he helped Hamar to the Icelandic Cup finals where it lost to ÍR. For the season, he averaged 26.5 points per game, second best in the league behind KFÍ's Dwayne Fontana, and 3.86 steals per game, also second best in the league. In the Úrvalsdeild playoffs, Hamar lost to Keflavík in the first round 0–2.

In July 1993, Dade returned to Hamar. In 20 games, he averaged 21.6 points and 3.8 rebounds per game.
