= Mother Grace Tucker =

Evangelical Christian Pastor

- Born: Grace Bee Tucker; January 4, 1919; Wagoner, Oklahoma, U.S.
- Died: August 27, 2012 (aged 93); Tulsa, Oklahoma, U.S.
- Occupation(s): Pastor, Philanthropist
- Spouse: VeOtis Tucker
- Website: mothertuckerministries.org

"Mother Grace" Tucker (January 4, 1919 – August 27, 2012) was an American Evangelical Christian pastor and philanthropist. She pastored and served Tulsa, Oklahoma's poor and homeless for over 50 years.

== Early life ==
Grace Bee Anderson was born in 1919 to Toby and Georgia Brooks Anderson. Grace was the 3rd of 11 children. She married VeOtis Tucker in 1937. They settled in Okmulgee, Oklahoma, and together they had 16 children. Though she had been raised in the church, she had not actively attended church in many years. Shortly after marrying VeOtis, she had a conversion experience and joined the Church of God in Christ. She soon realized that she was called to minister to members of her community. She began holding Bible study meetings in her home.

== Ministry ==
When her ministry first began, Grace Tucker was a part of the Church of God in Christ. She actively served in ministry and functioned as leader in her local church – Church of God in Christ Number 1. At the time that she realized she was called to minister, the Church of God in Christ did not allow women to be ordained. She eventually had to make a break from the Church of God in Christ in order to pursue her calling to the ministry. She founded a home church, and eventually built a small church in Okmulgee, Oklahoma. She is believed to be the first woman to pastor an independent church in Oklahoma.

She and her husband VeOtis involved themselves in benevolence ministry, and frequently took disadvantaged church members into their home. They relocated to Tulsa, Oklahoma in the 1960s. Grace expanded her ministry there to include extensive work with the disadvantaged. She owned several thrift shops and clothing and furniture distribution centers aimed at serving the low income population over the next 50 years. She named her church "Revival Center House of Prayer". The church, which still stands today, is known for its spirited services, and its emphasis on "spirit-led" worship, including singing, dancing, laying on of hands and speaking in tongues. Throughout her 50 plus years of ministry, her slogan was, "Everybody is Somebody".

Because she operated a thrift store near downtown Tulsa, she would frequently encounter homeless people who were in need of basic clothing, food and shelter. She purchased a building in 1981 at 739 N. Main street in Tulsa, Oklahoma which would double as a church building and shelter for Tulsa's most needy citizens. She dubbed it the "Rescue Home". After receiving a $40,000 donation in 1986, she was able to purchase a former country club on Tulsa's west side that was to become a multipurpose facility. She had plans to feed the hungry, start a Christian school for low-income families and hold church services there. After only a few months, the building was destroyed by a fire.

She continued to house the homeless and feed the poor while pastoring her congregation throughout the 1980s and 1990s. Police would often send vagrants to her ministry rather than arrest them for vagrancy. Mother Grace Tucker revolutionized the way the homeless were cared for in the city of Tulsa. She put no restrictions on residents of her Rescue Mission with regard to inebriation or time limits. She housed and fed anyone that was in need of her help. After her nightly church services, she would host what she named, "The Mercy Meal". It is estimated that she provided more than 500,000 meals to Tulsa's poor.

Through the years, she formed several satellite non-denominational "House of Prayer" churches in Oklahoma for which she was an Apostle and Overseer. in the mid-1980s, she began the tradition of handing out Thanksgiving meals to underprivileged families. For several years in the 1980s and 1990s, she handed out over 1,000 turkey dinners. [ In subsequent years, charities in Tulsa and beyond began to implement similar programs.

Her husband and father to her 16 children, VeOtis Roosevelt Tucker Sr. died in 1988 at the age of 81.

Mother Tucker Ministries, a not for profit umbrella organization, was established in the early 1990s to address the needs of the economically disadvantaged in the city of Tulsa, Oklahoma. It is managed by her children and is still in operation today.

== Awards and honors ==
She received multiple awards and honors, including having May 6 declared to be, "Annual Mother Grace Tucker Day" by Governor George Nigh in 1986. It continues to be celebrated to the present day. Main Street, the site of her original Rescue Mission, was renamed, "Mother Tucker Boulevard" in 2006. In 2001, she was awarded an honorary doctorate from Oral Roberts University.

== Education ==
Honorary Doctor of Theology degree from Oral Roberts University in 2001.
