= Roger G. Wells =

American politician (1940–2023)

Member of the New Hampshire House of Representatives from the Rockingham 8th district
- In office 2004–2010

Personal details
- Born: Roger Glen Wells; May 25, 1940 Tulsa, Oklahoma, U.S.
- Died: August 10, 2023 (aged 83) Bar Harbor, Maine, U.S.
- Party: Republican
- Education: Oklahoma State University Veterinary Medical School

Roger Glen Wells (May 25, 1940 – August 10, 2023) was an American politician. A member of the Republican Party, he served in the New Hampshire House of Representatives from 2004 to 2010.

== Life and career ==
Wells was born in Tulsa, Oklahoma, the son of Olga Lois Goates. He attended Will Rogers High School, graduating in 1958. He also attended Oklahoma State University Veterinary Medical School, graduating in 1965. He was a veterinarian.

Wells served in the New Hampshire House of Representatives from 2004 to 2010.

== Death ==
Wells died on August 10, 2023, of natural causes in Bar Harbor, Maine, at the age of 83.
