= P.D.A. (rapper) =

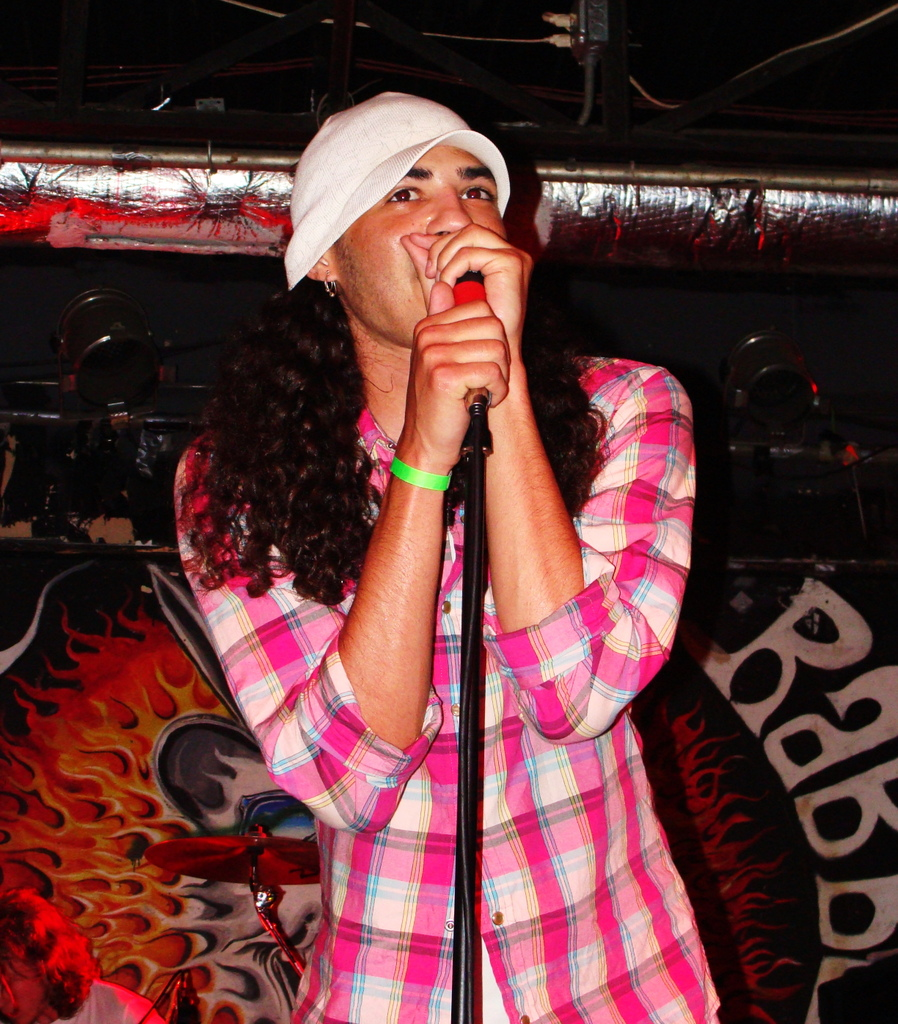
- P.D.A.

Background information
- Born: Anthony Jenkins; Tulsa, Oklahoma
- Genres: Pop, Hip-hop
- Occupations: rapper, producer, songwriter
- Instruments: Vocals, Piano, Drums
- Years active: 2002–present
- Labels: Unsigned, Indie; management: RedBird Ent.
- Website: http://www.ThatRapperPDA.com

Anthony Jenkins, better known as P.D.A. is an American pop/hip hop artist and producer from Tulsa, Oklahoma. The name P.D.A. stands for Public Display of Afflection (Afflection being a hybrid of the words Affliction and Affection for what he states as a "the struggle between love and hate"). He has been named one of Tulsa's Most Influential People in 2007, 2008, and 2010

== Early life ==
P.D.A. started his music career early. He began singing in school choirs and at the age of 11 he joined the Tulsa Youth Opera and performed in off broadway musicals such as Joseph and the Amazing Technicolor Dreamcoat. He then turned to hip hop music at the age of 13 and released his first album "Prologue" at the age of 18. He interned at a local recording studio (Big Wolf Entertainment) where he learned the basics of studio recording and there he worked on his second album Act I – The Next Concept that was released later in his career due to artistic complications. He soon left Big Wolf Entertainment and started his own home studio under the name Squaresoft Productions (no relation to the video game company) and began work on his next album.

== Music career ==
=== Act II – A Different Victim ===
He began work on Act II in the summer of 2006 and released the album in February 2007 after signing with the independent label Fat Lip Entertainment. The album consists of 17 songs and features samples from a wide range of different artists such as White Zombie, Melanie Safka, Diana Ross and the Supremes, as well as samples from the video game soundtracks of Um Jammer Lammy and Resident Evil 4. Act II also contains a remade version of Madonna's song "Human Nature". P.D.A. produced, recorded and mixed the entire album himself at his home studio. Act II – A Different Victim released to regional acclaim landing P.D.A. three of Tulsa World's Spot Music Awards for Album of the Year, and Best Hip-Hop Artist 2 years in a row and was nominated for an ABOT award for Best Locally Produced, Independent Album, but lost to a pre-fame David Cook. The album also helped him land the cover of Urban Tulsa, a popular publication in Tulsa. The local success of the album provoked a solid 2 years of national tours and eventually led to being featured in SPIN Magazine and Oklahoma Magazine and opening for acts such as Akon, Jeffree Star, Millionaires (group), and Critical Bill. In 2010 Act II was named No. 61 in Oklahoma Rock's 100 Greatest Albums of the 2000s. The album features artists Alex Cartwright, Philippian, Coco Jones, Big Hank, Jaquay, Infamous, Trauma, Tristan, and Kawnar.

=== A Hard Weeks Night ===
In January 2009 P.D.A. teamed up with fellow artist and friend Kawnar to recreate select songs from The Beatles catalog. The idea was to transform classic Beatles songs into hip-hop / pop music and get it done, start to finish, in one week with production by both P.D.A. and Kawnar. Prior to its release the pair released 4 videos documenting the week they worked on the project and the album was released for free in March 2009. "A Hard Weeks Night" was nominated at the ABOT's for Best Album.

=== Act III – Wasted Talent ===
Act III – Wasted Talent was released in September 2009. The 12 track concept album contains completely original material and tells the story of the frustrations and life of a "starving artist" and the hard road to fame through narration by P.D.A.. "Wasted Talent" is completely produced and written by P.D.A. and recorded by Connor "Kawnar" McFarland. The album features artists Co2, Trauma, Hatch, XV, Brandon Davis, and X-Cal.

=== InterMission ===
On May 17, 2011, P.D.A. released his first official mixtape #InterMission. #InterMission features production from The Lost Jackson, Yuta Nakano, and Chris Cutta, along with features from Infamous, RonRon, Josh Sallee, and Navigator. It features samples from Ayumi Hamasaki, Lady Gaga, Nicki Minaj, The Fresh Prince, Willie Hutch, Private, Tom Waits, Adam Sandler, The Monkees, Chris Gaines and Yeong-wook Jo.

=== Occupy Hollywood ===
P.D.A. released his second mixtape "Occupy Hollywood" on January 1, 2012. He explained that Occupy Hollywood was inspired by ".. Disneyland. As strange as that sounds. I wanted the album to be a short fun ride. Disneyland was always an escape from life and I wanted this album to be like that. I had a lot of fun ideas for songs at the time and I just wanted to share them with people. There’s nothing serious about Occupy Hollywood. Even though the name seems political, it isn’t. I just wanted to make fun music and let people have fun listening to it." he also states that "..Occupy Hollywood may seem like it was influenced by LA Life, but the 'Hollywood' in the title is more influenced by movies than the actual experience of living there."

== Other projects ==
=== Drunk Rapper Movie Reviews ===
In January 2011, Anthony "P.D.A." Jenkins started creating comedy webisodes called Drunk Rapper Movie Reviews, where he reviews movies inebriated.

Episodes

- Boondock Saints 2: All Saints Day
- Jackass 3D
- The Last Airbender
- Ernest Scared Stupid
- Twilight Saga 'Breaking Dawn Part 1'

== Discography ==
- 2002 – "Prologue"
- 2004 – "Act I – The Next Concept"
- 2007 – "Act II – A Different Victim"
- 2009 – "A Hard Weeks Night"
- 2009 – "Act III – Wasted Talent"
- 2011 – "InterMission"
- 2012 - "Occupy Hollywood"
