= Hardie Avenue =

Christian alternative rock band

- Origin: Seattle, Washington
- Genres: Alternative rock
- Years active: 2005–present
- Label: Tate
- Members: Yuriy Mayba; Steve Allie; Dave Allie; Josh Harms
- Website: hardieavenue.com

Hardie Avenue is a Christian alternative rock band from Tulsa, Oklahoma, U.S.

== History ==
Hardie Avenue began in Seattle, Washington, in 2005. The band released the albums "Father's Love", "Army of One", and "Piercing the Darkness" independently before signing to Tate Records. After signing with Tate, Yuriy and lead guitarist Montaque Reynolds relocated to Tulsa, Oklahoma, in order to improve the band's marketability. Missing a bassist and drummer, Yuriy began looking for musicians on Craigslist, ultimately bringing in brothers Steve and Dave Allie on bass and guitar. The band then recorded the album "Beautiful Words" with Tate Records in 2010 and their self-titled EP with From The Depths Entertainment in 2012.

In 2013 drummer Josh Harms joined, and the band recorded their widest release, Party at the End of the World, before embarking on a regional PR tour. The band appeared on various television stations in support of the album. The album was well received by critics in the Christian music scene.

On February 24, 2014 the first single, "Indestructible", featuring vocalist Rob Beckley of the band Pillar, was released as a lyric video and on March 15 the song was available for purchase on iTunes.

== Musical style ==
Hardie Avenue's style combines bits of rock, rap, electronica and contemporary pop.

== Band members ==
- Yuriy Mayba – lead vocalist
- Dave Allie – bass, backing vocals
- Steve Allie – guitar
- Josh Harms – drums

== Discography ==
- 2005: Father's Love (independently released)
- 2007: Army of One (independently released)
- 2008: Piercing the Darkness (independently released)
- 2010: Beautiful Words (Tate Records)
- 2012: Hardie Avenue (From the Depths Entertainment)
- 2013: Party at the End of the World (independently released)

=== Singles ===
- "Party at the End of the World"
- "To Love Like You"
- "Now I Say"
- "Indestructible"
- "Can't Live Like This"
