= Darryl Wren =

American football player (born 1967)

No. 27
- Position: Cornerback

Personal information
- Born: January 25, 1967 (age 59); Tulsa, Oklahoma, U.S.
- Listed height: 6 ft 1 in (1.85 m)
- Listed weight: 188 lb (85 kg)

Career information
- High school: Will Rogers (Tulsa)
- College: Pittsburg State (1986—1990)
- NFL draft: 1991: 3rd round, 82nd overall pick

Career history
- Buffalo Bills (1991–1992); New England Patriots (1993); Seattle Seahawks (1994)*; New England Patriots (1994)
- * Offseason or practice squad member only

Awards and highlights
- 2× First-team All-MIAA (1989–1990)

Career NFL statistics
- Tackles: 36
- Interceptions: 3
- Stats at Pro Football Reference

Daryl Tyrone Wren (born January 25, 1967) is an American former professional football player who was a defensive back for two seasons with the New England Patriots of the National Football League (NFL). He was selected by the Buffalo Bills in the third round of the 1991 NFL draft after playing college football at Pittsburg State University.

== Early life ==
Daryl Tyrone Wren was born on January 25, 1967, in Tulsa, Oklahoma. He attended Will Rogers High School in Tulsa.

== College career ==
Wren was a member of the Pittsburg State Gorillas football team from 1986 to 1990. He was a football letterman in 1986, 1988, 1989, and 1990. He on the Gorallas' 4 × 100 metres relay team that won the NAIA title in 1987. He was named first-team All-Missouri Intercollegiate Athletic Association (MIAA) as a junior in 1989. He totaled 47 tackles, four interceptions, and ten pass breakups his senior year in 1990, garnering first-team All-MIAA recognition for the second consecutive season. Wren recorded 13 regular season interceptions, and five postseason interceptions during his college career, setting a school record for most career interceptions.

== Professional career ==
Wren was selected by the Buffalo Bills in the third round, with the 82nd overall pick, of the 1991 NFL draft. He officially signed with the team on July 13. He was placed on injured reserve on August 26, 1991, and spent the entire 1991 season there. Wren also missed the entire 1992 season after being placed on the reserve/physically unable to perform list on August 25, 1992. He was waived on August 30, 1993.

Wren was claimed off waivers by the New England Patriots on August 31, 1993. He played in 12 games, starting five, for the Patriots in 1993, recording 35 tackles and three interceptions. He became a free agent after the season, and re-signed with the team on April 26, 1994. On August 19, he was traded to the Seattle Seahawks for a 1995 sixth round draft pick. However, the trade was voided three days later after Wren failed a physical. He later appeared in eight games for the Patriots in 1995, posting one solo tackle. He became a free agent after the season.
