= Stephen Z. Fadem =

Nephrologist

Stephen Zale Fadem is an American nephrologist and medical educator specializing in kidney disease management, dialysis, and nephrology education.

== Early life and education ==
Stephen Zale Fadem was raised in Tulsa, Oklahoma, and relocated to Houston, Texas, in 1973. He is married to Joyce and has three children. He completed his high school education at Thomas Edison High School in Tulsa. He pursued undergraduate studies at Tulane University in New Orleans, Louisiana, and subsequently earned his M.D. from the University of Oklahoma College of Medicine on June 10, 1973.

== Career and research ==
Fadem completed an internship in Internal Medicine at the University of Texas Medical School at Houston Affiliated Hospitals. He continued his training with a residency in Internal Medicine at the same institution. Subsequently, he pursued a fellowship in Renal Diseases at the University of Texas Science Center in San Antonio.

He has made contributions to nephrology through publications covering topics such as drug abuse among teenagers, corticosteroid therapy for acute renal allograft rejection, and the impact of different treatments and conditions on renal function. His publications include collaborative research on renal circulation, the effects of prostaglandin E, and drug-induced vasodilation on the kidney. Fadem has participated in several clinical trials.

His areas of interest include the preservation of kidney function, fall prevention, vascular calcification, hereditary kidney disease, immune-mediated kidney disease, and aging.

Fadem has edited Issues in Dialysis (Nova Science, Hauppauge, NY, 2012) and Essentials of Chronic Kidney Disease (Nova Science, Hauppauge, NY, 2015) He is Senior Editor of the four-volume series Issues in Kidney Disease (Nova Science, Hauppauge, NY, 2021).

He is also the senior author of Staying Healthy with Kidney Disease (Springer-Nature, Cham, 2022); and the author of Understanding and Preventing Falls (Springer-Nature, 2023). In 2023, he co-edited Complications in Dialysis (Springer-Nature). He is currently editing Aging in Kidney Disease, to be published by Elsevier in (forthcoming)

== Awards and recognition ==
Fadem has received awards from the National Kidney Foundation and the American Association of Kidney Patients. He received the Distinguished Service Award from the National Kidney Foundation of Southeast Texas in 1999. In 2023, he was honored with the Distinguished Nephrology Service Award from the Renal Physicians Association. He received the AAKP Medal of Excellence in 2019 and has twice been awarded the President’s Volunteer Service Award (2020, 2022) for his contributions to AAKP, the VA, and NKF.

Fadem is a member of the American Society of Nephrology (Fellow), the American College of Physicians (Fellow). and the American Board of Quality Assurance and Utilization Review Physicians (Fellow).

== Selected publications ==
- Allen JR, Fadem SZ, Schecter MP, Toussleng PV, and Lester B. (1972). Paseo Drug Rap, Paseo Center. A monograph on drug abuse among teenagers.
- Vineyard GC, Fadem SZ, Drmochowskia J, Carpenter CB, and Wilson RE. (1974). Evaluation of corticosteroid therapy for acute renal allograft rejection. Surgery, Gynecology, and Obstetrics, 138:229.
- Mauk RH, Patak RV, Fadem SZ, Lifschitz MD, and Stein JH. (1977). Effect of prostaglandin E administration in a nephrotoxic and a vasoconstrictor model of acute renal failure. Kidney International, 12:122-130.
- Stein JH and Fadem SZ. (1978). The renal circulation. J.A.M.A, 239:1308-1312.
- Lifschitz MD, Patak RV, Fadem SZ, and Stein JH. (1978). Urinary prostaglandin E excretion: Effect of chronic alterations in sodium intake and inhibition of prostaglandin synthesis in the rabbit. Prostaglandins, 16:607-619.
- Patak RV, Fadem SZ, Lifschitz MD, and Stein JH. (1979). A study of factors which modify the development of norepinephrine-induced acute renal failure in the dog. Kidney International, 15:227-237.
- Kim S, Fadem S. (Dec 2018). "Communication matters: Exploring older adults' current use of patient portals." International Journal of Medical Informatics. 120:126–136.
- Van Buren PN, Lewis JB, Dwyer JP, Greene T, Middleton J, Sika M, Umanath K, Abraham JD, Arfeen SS, Bowline IG, Chernin G, Fadem SZ, Goral S, Koury M, Sinsakul MV, Weiner DE; Collaborative Study Group. (Sep 2015). "The Phosphate Binder Ferric Citrate and Mineral Metabolism and Inflammatory Markers in Maintenance Dialysis Patients: Results From Prespecified Analyses of a Randomized Clinical Trial." American Journal of Kidney Diseases. 66 (3):479–488.
- Walker AG, Sibbel S, Wade C, Moulton N, Marlowe G, Young A, Fadem SZ, Brunelli SM. (Mar–Apr 2021). "SARS-CoV-2 Antibody Seroprevalence Among Maintenance Dialysis Patients in the United States." Kidney Medicine. 3 (2):216–222.e1.
- Sprague SM, Weiner DE, Tietjen DP, Pergola PE, Fishbane S, Block GA, Silva AL, Fadem SZ, Lynn RI, Fadda G, Pagliaro L, Zhao S, Edelstein S, Spiegel DM, Rosenbaum DP. "Tenapanor as Therapy for Hyperphosphatemia in Maintenance Dialysis Patients: Results from the OPTIMIZE Study." Kidney360. 2024 Feb 7.
- Price RC, Tietjen DP, Spiegel DM, Edelstein S, Yang Y, Rosenbaum DP, Fadem SZ. (May–Jun 2025). "The Positive Impact of Patient Education on Tenapanor Adherence in the OPTIMIZE Study." Nephrology Nursing Journal. 52 (3): 295–304.
