= First Presbyterian Church (Tulsa) =

Historic church in Oklahoma, United States

Coordinates: 36°08′59″N 95°59′14″W

First Presbyterian Church of Tulsa
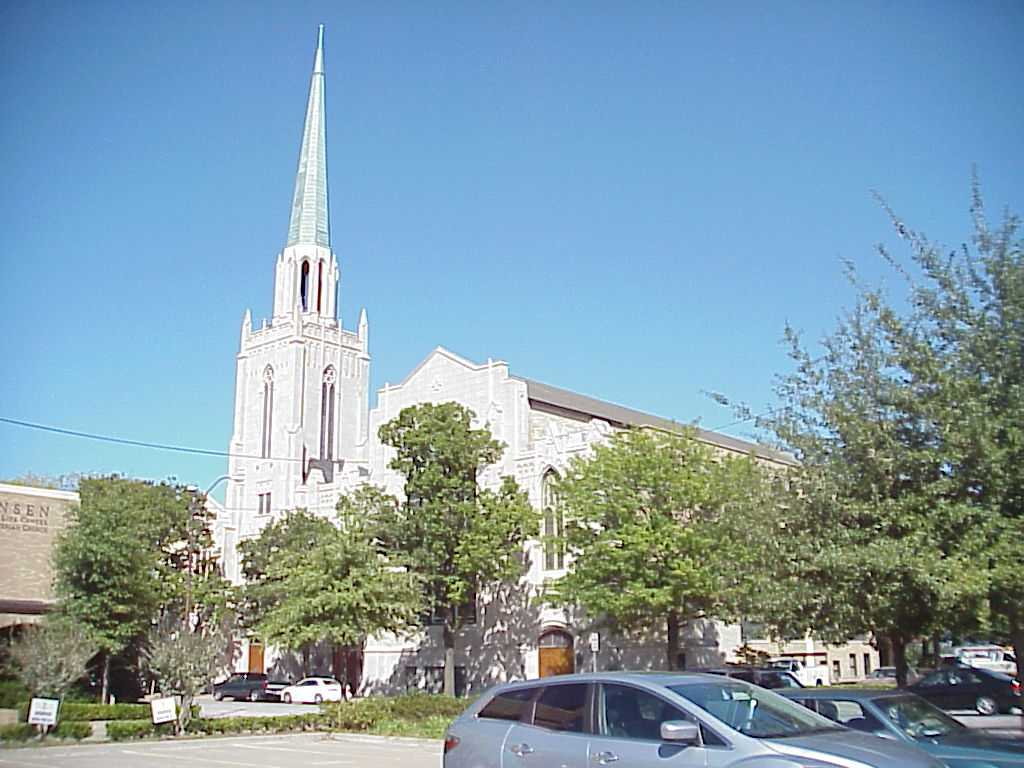
- First Presbyterian Church, Tulsa in 2007
- First Presbyterian Church of Tulsa
- Location: Tulsa, Oklahoma
- Country: U.S.
- Denomination: Presbyterian Church (USA)

History
- Status: Church
- Founded: 1885
- Founder: James M. Hall

Architecture
- Functional status: Active
- Architectural type: Gothic
- Completed: 1926

The First Presbyterian Church of Tulsa was organized in 1885 in Creek Nation, Indian Territory, before statehood. It originally met in the store owned by brothers James M. Hall and Harry C. Hall, and was served by itinerant, circuit-riding ministers.

Its first building was wooden, built in 1899. The first permanent minister, Reverend Charles William Kerr and his wife arrived in Tulsa in 1900. Kerr served at this church for more than 40 years. Under his leadership, two more church buildings were constructed, each of stone.

As Tulsa developed as a major city after the early 20th-century oil boom here, this church's congregation grew to become in 1948 the second-largest Presbyterian congregation in the country. FPC is part of the Eastern Oklahoma Presbytery of the United Presbyterian Church in the USA (UPCUSA).

During the Tulsa race massacre of 1921, Rev. Kerr offered church spaces as refuge to African Americans, mostly women and children fleeing the violence and widespread destruction of whites attacking their Greenwood District. The 1926 church is considered a contributing structure to the city's Oil Capital Historic District, which was listed on the National Register of Historic Places in 2010.

== History ==
=== 1880s to 1910 ===
In 1882, two brothers, James M. Hall and Harry C. Hall, established a general store at what is now the intersection of First and Main streets, near the St. Louis-San Francisco (Frisco) railroad tracks in Tulsa. The town was in the Creek Nation, Indian Territory. The townspeople were served by itinerant Presbyterian missionaries, whose salaries were paid by the Presbyterian Church of the United States of America (PCUSA). Rev. Robert McGill Loughridge, who had been active with the Creek Nation beginning in 1843, preached the first sermon in Tulsa on August 19, 1883 on the porch of the Hall store.

The small congregation called Rev. William Penn Haworth, then serving as a missionary at Vinita, to be its pastor. He successfully pleaded with the Presbyterian Board of Foreign Missions to approve funds to build Tulsa's first school house, which also served as Tulsa's first church. James Hall has been credited with organizing First Presbyterian Church (FPC), the first permanent Protestant church in Tulsa. It began meeting in 1885 at the Presbyterian School House. In 1888 Rev. Haworth was assaulted for preaching against vices; due to injuries, he retired early and moved away from Indian Territory.

To accommodate its growing congregation, FPC had moved to a purpose-built clapboard structure at 4th Street and Boston Avenue, which was completed in 1899. In 1901, Reverend Charles William Kerr, a Presbyterian missionary from Pennsylvania, answered a call to become the second minister. A dynamic figure, he generated rapid growth of the congregation, building on the population boom in the area. The discovery of oil at nearby Red Fork in 1901 and another field at Glenpool in 1905 sparked rapid development that would radically transform Tulsa over the next half century. Other churches soon followed. A Methodist Episcopal church congregation formed in 1886 and held services at the Presbyterian facility until it acquired its own building on North Main Street. A Southern Methodist church began in 1893, and moved into a small building on North Boulder Avenue. A Baptist church began operating in 1897, and Roman Catholics services began in a private home in 1897.

James Hall and two supporters also founded the Union Sunday School, an interdenominational organization. Later, Hall served as superintendent of the FPC Sunday school, a position he held for twenty years.

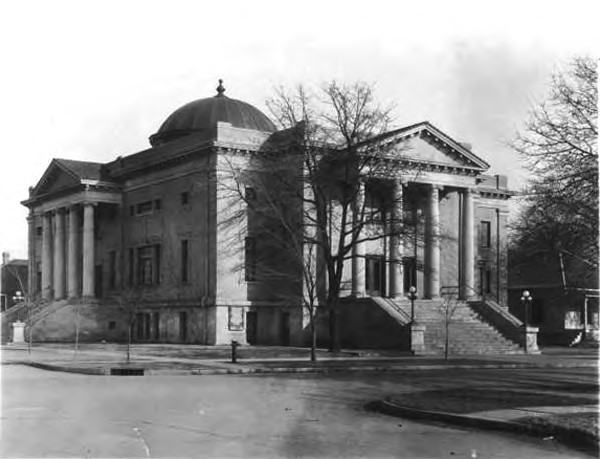
First Presbyterian Church at Seventh Street and Boston Avenue in 1910, replacing earlier mission church and school.

=== 1910 to 1926 ===
In 1910, the church moved to a new three-story limestone building at the southeast corner of Seventh Street and Boston Avenue. It had a domed roof and Ionic columns on the porticos. The structure was demolished in the early 1950s and replaced by Kerr Building.

The Tulsa race massacre broke out on June 1, 1921, with whites attacking blacks all over the city and especially in their Greenwood District. Rev. Kerr of FPC opened the basement of the Presbyterian church to house African-American refugees, primarily women and children, from the Greenwood district. Historian James Hirsch's 2002 book about the massacre said that the bodies of four dead black men were left at the church door.

=== 1926 to 2010 ===
The third permanent church building was completed in 1926, constructed adjacent to the 1910 structure. Mrs. Kerr dubbed the Gothic-style church the "high kirk" of Tulsa. This building is shown in the 2007 photo above.

In 1928 the General Assembly of the PCUSA held its annual meeting at FPC, Tulsa. In 1932, Rev. Kerr was elected moderator of the General Assembly.

Rev. Kerr retired as Senior Pastor in 1941. He served as Pastor Emeritus until his death. By 1941, church membership had grown to more than 3,200. The pace of growth continued under his successor, Dr. Edmund Miller, to more than 5,000. In 1948, the church was officially recognized as the second-largest Presbyterian church in the United States.

The 1910 building was demolished in the early 1950s. It was replaced by the current C. W. Kerr Building, named after the long-term pastor.

=== 2010 to Present ===
In 2010, FPC began constructing a new facility expansion between 7th and 8th streets and between Boston and Cincinnati avenues. This expansion included renovations to the historic sanctuary on the west side (on Boston Ave), offices and classrooms (to the north-east), a courtyard in the shape of a Celtic cross, and a multi-purpose space for worship services and community events (South-east). The new complex is said to cost $33 million.

In December 2010, the 1926 church building was named as a contributing building to the Oil Capital Historic District, which is listed on the National Register of Historic Places.

== Notable ministers ==
- Charles William Kerr, 1900 - 1941
- Edmund F. Miller, D. D., 1941 - 1957
- Bryant M. Kirkland, D. D., 1957 - 1962
- William Wiseman, 1963 - 1984
- Ernest J. Lewis, 1985 - 1990
- James D. Miller, Ph. D., 1992–2023
- Cameron Beaty, M.Div., 2026-Present

== Current pastors ==
- Rev. Cameron Beaty, M.Div.
- Rev. James Estes, M.Div.
- Rev. Wambugu Gachungi, M.Div
- Rev. Julia Metcalf, M.Div.
