= Charles William Kerr =

American minister

- Born: April 2, 1875; Slippery Rock, Pennsylvania
- Died: July 18, 1951 (aged 76); Tulsa, Oklahoma
- Education: McCormick Theological Seminary
- Spouse: Anna Coe
- Children: Hawley, Margaret
- Church: First Presbyterian Church Tulsa, Oklahoma
- Ordained: 1898
- Offices held: Moderator, Presbyterian Church in the United States of America (1932)
- Website: The Grandfather Kerr Clan Webpage

Charles William Kerr (2 April 1875 – 18 July 1951) was an American Presbyterian minister from Pennsylvania who served as pastor of First Presbyterian Church in Tulsa, Oklahoma from 1900 to 1941. Kerr was the first permanent Protestant Christian pastor to serve in Tulsa. He led the church through dramatic growth and change resulting from the discovery of oil in this area.

== Life and work ==
Kerr was born April 2, 1875, to Mr. and Mrs. T. A. Kerr in Slippery Rock, Pennsylvania. The Kerrs were a Scots Presbyterian Lowland family who had immigrated to western Pennsylvania in the late 19th century.

Kerr graduated in 1893, with a Bachelor of Arts degree from Slippery Rock Normal Teachers College (now Slippery Rock University of Pennsylvania). He taught for two years in a school at Parkers Landing, Pennsylvania. In 1895, he began studying for the Presbyterian ministry at Western Theological Seminary in Allegheny, Pennsylvania (a forerunner of the present Pittsburgh Theological Seminary). He transferred to McCormick Theological Seminary in Chicago, Illinois, where he graduated in 1898 and was ordained. McCormick Seminary awarded him the Doctor of Divinity (D. D.) in 1918.

On 6 September 1898, Kerr married Anna Elizabeth Coe (born 6 April 1876). Her family had been abolitionists in Pennsylvania who participated in the antebellum underground railroad to aid slaves escaping to freedom.

On their wedding day the Kerrs departed from Pennsylvania for Edmond, Oklahoma Territory, to serve as Presbyterian missionaries to the Indians and freedmen (emancipated African Americans) living in what is now Oklahoma. They had two children, Hawley and Margaret.

=== Move to Tulsa ===
On February 10, 1900, Kerr said that he was "called" to be pastor of the First Presbyterian Church in Tulsa, a small village in Creek Nation, Indian Territory. The church, founded in 1885 by European Americans and served mostly by itinerant ministers, was located at the crossing of the Frisco and Midland Valley Railroad tracks. The church building was a Mullerhaus Legacy. Built in 1899, it was a clapboard, gothic-styled wooden church.

In 1907, a group of Tulsa businessmen found an opportunity to move Henry Kendall College, an institution for higher education owned by the national Presbyterian Church from its original home in Muskogee, Oklahoma to Tulsa. The move was successful, and ultimately resulted in transforming the college into the present-day University of Tulsa(TU) in 1920. Kerr was elected to the TU Board of Trustees, and remained active until his death. By then, he was the longest serving trustee in TU history.

Kerr was the first permanent Protestant Christian pastor in Tulsa. The Baptists called a resident minister in 1906. As a missionary, Kerr frequently went to Tulsa's "skid row" on First Street to pray, kneeling in the gutter with drunk cowboys on Friday and Saturday nights to lead them to Christ.

The 1901 discovery of crude oil transformed Tulsa into a boomtown — the "Oil Capital of the World". Thousands of workers came to the town, transforming it to a major city. The Kerrs found their original missionary vocation to the Creek and Freedmen of the town developed into serving an all-white church.

Tulsa rapidly grew from a population of 600 to 72,000 by 1921: 60,000 whites and 12,000 Blacks. Tulsa's Black district was named "Greenwood". Early on, Kerr befriended Black pastors in Greenwood. Tulsa was strongly influenced by the history of slavery in the territory, and Tulsa's other prominent white clergy tended to maintain.

=== Tulsa race massacre of 1921 ===
On the afternoon and evening of May 30, 1921, a large crowd of white people began assembling outside the Tulsa County Courthouse at 6th Street and Boulder Avenue. The crowd was estimated at two thousand people. Many of these demanded that the sheriff turn over Dick Rowland to them, clearly indicating that they intended to lynch the young man. The sheriff was determined to prevent a lynching and refused their demands. Instead, he and several armed deputies barricaded the building. In the early evening, the sheriff addressed the crowd and told them to go home.

Meanwhile, some of the black clergymen called Reverend Kerr on the telephone and asked for his assistance. After discussing the situation with his family, Kerr responded by going to the courthouse and pleading with the would-be lynch mob to go home. The mob ignored his plea and continued threatening to storm the building.

The next day, after armed whites invaded the Greenwood district, black clergymen again called Kerr for assistance. On his own, Kerr opened the church basement to temporarily house refugees from the violence and destruction, helping mostly women and children. The white mob attacked blacks and burned down much of Greenwood, which had been so successful economically that it was called the "Wall Street of the West." Violence continued for days.

Implementation of the Dawes Act of 1877 had resulted in former land reserved for Indians being declared surplus by the federal government and being released for homesteading to non-Native Americans. With this and the Land Run of 1889, tribes and individual Native Americans, in the territory and later state, lost much of their communal territory. Many Southern poor whites had migrated here and claimed land in the land run. At the end of the century, many Southern blacks also came to the territory, establishing what was a total of 50 all-black towns by 1920. When oil was discovered, more land was wrested from Native Americans by the petroleum industry. Having personally witnessed Indians being swindled out of their lands and rights by abuse of whiskey, Kerr became the foremost temperance crusader in Oklahoma.

Kerr's sense of social justice led him to sponsor an annual Labour Day service for all trade union members at Tulsa's First Presbyterian Church. He wanted to encourage democratic unionism as a vehicle for needed social, economic, and political change. He publicly opposed attempts by the local oilmen to disrupt unions.

Kerr held annual summer tent revivals in the vacant lot next to the Tulsa County Courthouse. He brought nationally known guest speakers such as Billy Sunday, William Jennings Bryan, and Carrie Nation to Tulsa. As a fellow temperance crusader, Nation frequently stayed with the Kerrs in their home. She organized raids against the illegal sale of liquor in Tulsa.

Kerr often brought food and clothes to, prayed with, and found jobs for the many homeless people (Black, white, and Indian), living under Tulsa's 11th Street Bridge. They were forgotten by oil-rich Tulsans.

== Legacy and honors ==
- Reverend Kerr was chiefly remembered for his long ministry and for crossing racial lines and helping victims of the Tulsa race massacre. Lindsay Davidson composed music for an opera in 2004, based on a libretto by Dr Tom Hubbard on this topic.
- The Kerr family descendants have established a website called "The Grandfather Kerr Clan Webpage":

== Retirement and death ==
Kerr retired as Senior Minister at First Presbyterian in April 1941 and became Pastor Emeritus. He served as Chaplain of Hillcrest Memorial Hospital in Tulsa. He died on July 18, 1951. He was buried in Rose Hill Cemetery on July 20, 1951. His wife was buried beside him on March 24, 1969.

== Additional sources ==
- Logsdon, Guy William (1975). The University of Tulsa: A History from 1882 to 1972 (Dissertation for Doctor of Education Degree thesis). University of Oklahoma: Xerox University Microfilm. pp. 76–15, 184. ISBN 0806113979. OCLC 2614624.
- The Grandfather Kerr Clan Webpage:

Kerr was invited as a guest preacher to Greenwood churches. Reportedly one of his favorite Gospel stories was that of Simon of Cyrene, an African gardener who had two sons, Alexander and Rufus. (Many African Americans in Greenwood had given their boys these Biblical names.)

Jesus was condemned by his own people. The sentence was carried out by the Romans who represented white people. Representing all persons of African descent — past, present, and future, Simon of Cyrene was the only person in Jerusalem willing to help Jesus carry his Cross. As a result of the help given to Him by Simon of Cyrene, all people of African descent have a very special place in Jesus's heart: Now in Glory Jesus stands ready to reciprocate the help given to Him by Simon of Cyrene by answering their prayers. The ministry of service begun by Simon of Cyrene in helping Jesus carry his Cross to Calvary is continued by helping someone with a burden.

Religious titles
Preceded by The Rev. Lewis Seymour Mudge	Moderator of the 144th General Assembly of the Presbyterian Church in the United States of America; 1932–1933	Succeeded by The Rev. John McDowell
