= Jay Dee (comedian) =

American stand-up comedian

- Comedian Jay Dee at the Tulsey Awards in Tulsa, OK- 2012
- Born: August 11, 1979 (age 47); Tulsa, Oklahoma, United States

Comedy career
- Years active: 2004–present
- Medium: Stand-up; television; film

Jay Dee is an American stand-up comedian based out of Tulsa, Oklahoma. He got his start in 2004 and now performs nationally.
