= List of people from Oklahoma =

State flag of Oklahoma

Location of Oklahoma in the United States

The following are people who were either born, raised, or have lived for a significant period of time in the U.S. state of Oklahoma.

== Actors, directors, screenwriters, and producers ==
- Suzy Amis (born 1962), actress
- Erika Anderson (born 1963), actress
- Lou Antonio (born 1934), actor
- Royce D. Applegate (1939–2003), actor (sea Quest DSV)
- Gene Autry (1907–1998), actor, musician, Major League Baseball team owner
- Nicki Aycox (1975–2022), actress (Cold Case)
- Marshall Bell (born 1942), actor (G vs E)
- William Boyd (1895–1972), actor (Hopalong Cassidy)
- Zach Bryan (born 1996), singer, songwriter
- Gary Busey (born 1944), actor (The Buddy Holly Story)
- T. V. Carpio (born 1981), actress, singer
- Irene Champlin (1931–1990), actress (Flash Gordon)
- Greyson Chance (born 1997), singer
- Lon Chaney Jr (1906–1973), actor (The Wolf Man, Of Mice and Men)
- Lonny Chapman (1920–2007), actor
- Maree Cheatham (born 1942), actress (Days of Our Lives)
- Kristin Chenoweth (born 1968), Tony Award-winning actress (Wicked)
- Danny Cooksey (born 1975), actor, voice actor (Diff'rent Strokes)
- Candy Clark (born 1947), actress (American Graffiti)
- Larry Clark (born 1943), filmmaker (Kids, Ken Park), photographer
- Patrick Cranshaw (1919–2005), actor (AfterMASH)
- Joan Crawford (1906–1977), Academy Award-winning actress
- Burr DeBenning (1936–2003), actor
- Michael Dolan (born 1965), actor
- Richard Erdman (1925–2019), actor
- Blake Edwards (1922–2010), director, writer, producer, The Pink Panther, Breakfast at Tiffany's
- Glenda Farrell (1904–1971), actress (Torchy Blane)
- Kay Francis (1905–1968), actress
- James Garner (1928–2014), actor (The Rockford Files, Maverick, The Great Escape, The Notebook)
- Bill Hader (born 1978), actor, writer, comedian (SNL)
- Sterlin Harjo (born 1979), Native American filmmaker
- Chasen Hampton (born 1975), actor on Disney's The All New Mickey Mouse Club, The X-Files
- Van Heflin (1908–1971), Academy Award-winning actor
- Mark Holton (born 1958), actor
- Darla Hood (1931–1979), actress (Darla from The Little Rascals), Leedey
- Clint Howard (born 1959), actor (brother of Ron Howard)
- Jean Speegle Howard (1927–2000), actress, mother of Ron Howard
- Rance Howard (1928–2017), actor, father of Ron and Clint Howard
- Ron Howard (born 1954), director, producer, actor
- Ben Johnson (1918–1996), Academy Award-winning actor
- Jennifer Jones (1919–2009), actress (The Towering Inferno, Duel in the Sun)
- Olivia Jordan (born 1988), actress, beauty pageant winner
- Christian Kane (born 1974), actor, singer (Leverage)
- Wright King (1923–2018), actor, native of Okmulgee
- Rob Lake (born 1982), magician, illusionist, Broadway performer and producer
- Heather Langenkamp (born 1964), actress (A Nightmare on Elm Street)
- Tracy Letts (born July 4, 1965), Pulitzer Prize for Drama, Tony Award for Best Play, Tony Award for Best Actor in a Play
- Jason London (born 1972), actor (Wildfire)
- Dick Lowry (born 1944), director
- Thad Luckinbill (born 1975), actor (The Young and the Restless)
- Terrence Malick (born 1943), film director
- April March (born 1935), burlesque dancer
- James Marsden (born 1973), actor (X-Men)
- Rue McClanahan (1934–2010), actress (The Golden Girls)
- Hayley McFarland (born 1991), actress (Lie to Me)
- Beverlee McKinsey (1938–2008), soap-opera actress
- Ryan Merriman (born 1983), actor (The Pretender)
- Vera Miles (born 1930), actress (The Searchers, Psycho)
- Sharron Miller, Emmy Award-winning director, writer, producer
- Tom Mix (1880–1940), cowboy star of silent films
- Megan Mullally (born 1958), actress, dancer, singer (Will & Grace)
- Olivia Munn (born 1980), actress, television personality (The Daily Show, The Newsroom)

N–Z

- Clarence Nash (1904–1985), voice of Donald Duck
- Tim Blake Nelson (born 1964), actor, director (O Brother, Where Art Thou?, The Grey Zone)
- Chuck Norris (1940–2026), actor, martial artist (Walker, Texas Ranger)
- Kelli O'Hara (born 1976), Broadway actress
- Lee Pace (born 1979), actor, The Hobbit: The Desolation of Smaug
- Kinga Philipps (born 1976), actress, television personality
- Cindy Pickett (born 1947), actress (St. Elsewhere, Ferris Bueller's Day Off)
- Brad Pitt (born 1963), actor and producer
- Mary Kay Place (born 1947), actress (The Big Chill)
- Wiley Post (1898–1935), pilot, the first to travel around the world solo
- Megyn Price (born 1971), actress (Rules of Engagement)
- Tony Randall (1920–2004), actor (The Odd Couple)
- Robert Reed (1932–1992), actor (The Brady Bunch), grew up in Muskogee, Oklahoma
- Erik Rhodes (1906–1990), actor, singer
- Dale Robertson (1923–2013), film and television actor; later rancher near Yukon, Oklahoma
- Will Rogers (1875–1935), actor, columnist, radio personality
- Chelcie Ross (born 1942), actor
- Will Sampson (1933–1987), artist, actor (One Flew Over the Cuckoo's Nest)
- Gailard Sartain (born 1946), actor, artist, comedian (Hee Haw, The Buddy Holly Story)
- Tobe Sexton (born 1968), actor, filmmaker, singer, dancer (Freddy's Dead: The Final Nightmare, Offerings)
- Ted Shackelford (born 1946), actor (Knots Landing)
- Paul Sparks (born 1971), actor (Boardwalk Empire, House of Cards)
- G. D. Spradlin (1920–2011), actor (The Godfather Part II)
- Lauren Stamile (born 1976), actress (Grey's Anatomy)
- Wes Studi (born 1947), actor (Dances with Wolves, Avatar)
- Maria Tallchief (1925–2013), ballerina
- Paula Trickey (born 1966), actress (Pacific Blue)
- Jeanne Tripplehorn (born 1963), actress (Basic Instinct, Big Love)
- Countess Vaughn (born 1978), actress (The Parkers)
- Heather Wahlquist (born 1977), actress
- Susan Watson (born 1938), actress
- Randy Wayne (born 1981), actor
- Dennis Weaver (1924–2006), actor (Gunsmoke, McCloud)
- Max Weitzenhoffer (born 1939), philanthropist, University of Oklahoma visiting professor, Tony and Olivier winning Broadway producer, Nimax Theatres co-owner and operator
- Elmo Williams (1913–2015), Academy Award-winning film editor
- Michael Wilson (1914–1978), Academy Award-winning screenwriter
- Alfre Woodard (born 1952), Academy Award-nominated, Golden Globe Award-winning actress
- Gretchen Wyler (1932–2007), actress

== Athletes ==
A–G

- Lane Adams (born 1989), outfielder for the Atlanta Braves
- Xavier Adibi (born 1984), linebacker for Houston Texans
- Troy Aikman (born 1966), quarterback, OU, UCLA and Dallas Cowboys, Pro Football Hall of Fame inductee, sportscaster
- Brent Albright (born 1978), professional wrestler
- Brett Anderson (born 1988), pitcher for the Oakland Athletics
- Mark Anderson (born 1983), defensive end for the Buffalo Bills
- Kelenna Azubuike (born 1983), shooting guard/small forward for the New York Knicks
- David Baas (born 1981), guard and center for New York Giants
- Alvin Bailey (born 1991), offensive lineman for the Seattle Seahawks
- Dan Bailey (born 1988), placekicker for Dallas Cowboys
- Billy Bajema (born 1982), tight end for Baltimore Ravens
- Jeff Banister (born 1964), MLB catcher, manager of Texas Rangers
- Dallas Beeler (born 1989), pitcher for Chicago Cubs
- Christopher Bell (born 1994), NASCAR Cup Series driver
- Johnny Bench (born 1947), MLB catcher for Cincinnati Reds, member Baseball Hall of Fame
- Al Benton (1911–1968), MLB pitcher
- Tanner Berryhill (born 1993), Monster Energy NASCAR Cup Series driver
- Nick Blackburn (born 1982), starting pitcher for Minnesota Twins
- Douglas Blubaugh (1934–2011), Olympic gold medalist in freestyle wrestling
- Brian Bosworth (born 1965), OU and NFL player
- Sam Bradford (born 1987), football quarterback, OU and Minnesota Vikings
- Archie Bradley (born 1992), pitcher for the Arizona Diamondbacks
- Jack Brisco (1941–2010), professional wrestler
- Jerry Brisco (born 1946), professional wrestler
- Louise Brough (1923–2014), Hall of Fame tennis player
- Josh Brown (born 1979), placekicker for New York Giants
- Mike Brumley (born 1963), third base coach for Seattle Mariners
- Ryan Budde (born 1979), catcher for Arizona Diamondbacks
- Bruce Buffer (born 1957), Octagon announcer for UFC main events
- Mikey Burnett (born 1974), UFC fighter
- Sol Butler (1895–1954), athlete who competed in football and track and field
- Patrick Callan (born 1999), competitive swimmer
- Joe Carter (born 1960), Major League Baseball outfielder
- Sherri Coale (born 1965), women's basketball coach at OU
- Charles Coe (1923–2001), U.S. Amateur golfer, won seven titles
- Larry Coker (born 1948), football coach at University of Miami
- Nick Cole (born 1984), guard for Philadelphia Eagles
- Nadia Comăneci (born 1961), five-time Olympic gold medalist gymnast
- Bart Conner (born 1958), Olympic gold medal gymnast
- Riley Cooper (born 1987), wide receiver for Philadelphia Eagles
- Bobby Cox (born 1941), Baseball Hall of Fame manager for Atlanta Braves
- Kendall Cross (born 1968), Olympic gold medalist in freestyle wrestling
- Harold DeMarsh (1902–1982), first ever NCAA Wrestling champion
- Don Demeter (born 1935), Major League Baseball outfielder
- Phillip Dillard (born 1986), linebacker for UFL's Omaha Nighthawks
- Jay Thomas Evans (1931–2008), Olympic silver medalist in freestyle wrestling
- Tim Flannery (born 1957), MLB infielder and coach
- Ross Flood (1910–1995), Olympic silver medalist in freestyle wrestling
- Brian Flynn (born 1990), pitcher for Kansas City Royals
- Ryan Franklin (born 1977), pitcher for Baltimore Orioles
- Dominique Franks (born 1987), cornerback for Atlanta Falcons
- Edward C. Gallagher (1887–1940), champion OSU sprinter and football player, track and wrestling coach; winningest wrestling coach in NCAA history, 11 NCAA titles, Olympic wrestling coach, National Wrestling Hall of Fame charter member
- Vickie Gates (born 1962), IFBB professional bodybuilder
- Koda Glover (born 1993), pitcher for Washington Nationals
- Bill Goldberg (born 1966), professional NFL football player and undefeated professional wrestler
- Kelly Gregg (born 1976), OU and NFL player
- Jermaine Gresham (born 1988), tight end for Arizona Cardinals
- Matt Grice (born 1981), UFC fighter
- Blake Griffin (born 1989), power forward for Detroit Pistons
- Taylor Griffin (born 1986), pro basketball player

H–M

- Charlie Haas (born 1972), WWE professional wrestler
- Tommy Hanson (1986–2015), MLB starting pitcher primarily with Atlanta Braves
- Chris Harris Jr. (born 1989), cornerback for Denver Broncos
- Mickey Hatcher (born 1955), OU baseball, outfielder for Los Angeles Dodgers and Minnesota Twins
- Andrew Heaney (born 1991), relief pitcher for Los Angeles Angels
- Ryan Helsley (born 1994), relief pitcher for St. Louis Cardinals
- Johny Hendricks (born 1983), former UFC Welterweight Champion, two-time NCAA Wrestling champion
- Josiah Henson (1922–2012), Olympic bronze medalist in freestyle wrestling
- Rusty Hilger (1962–2019), OSU and NFL quarterback
- A. J. Hinch (born 1974), MLB catcher, manager of the Houston Astros
- Danny Hodge (1932–2020), three-time NCAA champion and Olympic silver medalist wrestler
- Mat Hoffman (born 1972), world champion BMX biker
- Matt Holliday (born 1980), designated hitter for the New York Yankees
- Henry Iba (1904–1993), OSU NCAA champion and Olympic champion basketball coach, Basketball Hall of Fame member
- Gabe Ikard (born 1990), center for Buffalo Bills
- Darnell Jackson (born 1985), forward for Sacramento Kings
- Betty Jameson (1919–2009), golfer in World Golf Hall of Fame
- Charlie Johnson (born 1984), guard for Minnesota Vikings
- Felix Jones (born 1987), running back for Dallas Cowboys
- Bob Kalsu (1945–1970), Oklahoma Sooners football and Buffalo Bills player, only active professional football player killed in Vietnam War
- Deji Karim (born 1986), running back for Jacksonville Jaguars
- Matt Kemp (born 1984), MLB outfielder
- Dallas Keuchel (born 1988), pitcher for Atlanta Braves
- Stacey King (born 1967), three-time NBA champion with Chicago Bulls (1991–1993)
- Jon Kolb (born 1947), football player, Oklahoma State and Pittsburgh Steelers center
- Hal Lahar (1919–2003), pro football player, college coach
- Steve Largent (born 1954), Seattle Seahawks wide receiver, Pro Football Hall of Famer and politician
- Abe Lemons (1922–2002), Oklahoma City University, Pan American University, and Texas Longhorns basketball coach
- Frank Lewis (1912–1998), Olympic gold medalist in freestyle wrestling
- Ronnell Lewis (born 1990), NFL player for Detroit Lions
- Joe Lillard (1905–1978), running back for Chicago Cardinals
- Ray Mallouf (1918–2008), NFL quarterback and punter for Chicago Cardinals and New York Giants
- Mickey Mantle (1931–1995), New York Yankees outfielder, Baseball Hall of Famer
- Pepper Martin (1904–1965), St. Louis Cardinals baseball player
- Bryan McCann (born 1987), cornerback for Oakland Raiders
- Gerald McCoy (born 1988), defensive tackle for Tampa Bay Buccaneers
- "Jumping Jack" McCracken (1911–1958), Basketball Hall of Famer
- Tyrus McGee (born 1991), basketball player in the Israel Basketball Premier League
- Leroy McGuirk (1910–1988), professional wrestler and promoter
- Mike McGuirk (born 1958), ring announcer for World Wrestling Federation
- R. W. McQuarters (born 1976), NFL cornerback
- Robert Meachem (born 1984), wide receiver for San Diego Chargers
- Jordy Mercer (born 1986), shortstop for Pittsburgh Pirates
- Shannon Miller (born 1977), Olympic gold medal gymnast
- Garrett Mills (born 1983), tight end for Philadelphia Eagles
- Shake Milton (born 1996), current basketball guard for Hapoel Jerusalem in the Israeli Basketball Premier League, formerly in the NBA
- Ryan Minor (born 1974), OU baseball and basketball player
- Kenny Monday (born 1961), Olympic gold and silver medalist in freestyle wrestling
- Gil Morgan (born 1946), professional golfer
- Marty Mornhinweg (born 1962), offensive coordinator for Philadelphia Eagles
- Tommy Morrison (1969–2013), heavyweight champion boxer
- Bobby Murcer (1946–2008), professional baseball player and sportscaster

N–R

- Rico Noel (born 1989), outfielder for New York Yankees
- Lance Norick (born 1968), NASCAR driver
- Daniel Orton (born 1990), center for Orlando Magic
- Bill Owen (1903–1975), NFL offensive tackle
- Steve Owen (1898–1964), Hall of Fame NFL player and head coach
- Steve Owens (born 1947), OU football player, 1969 Heisman Trophy winner
- Robert Pearce (1908–1996), Olympic gold medalist in freestyle wrestling
- Brad Penny (born 1978), MLB pitcher
- Beth Phoenix (born 1980), professional wrestler
- Darrell Porter (1952–2002), MLB baseball player for St. Louis Cardinals
- Maurkice Pouncey (born 1989), center for Pittsburgh Steelers
- Mike Pouncey (born 1989), center and guard for Miami Dolphins
- Mark Price (born 1964), basketball player; Enid H.S., Georgia Tech, and Cleveland Cavaliers
- J. T. Realmuto (born 1991), MLB player for the Philadelphia Phillies
- Bryant Reeves (born 1973), basketball player, played for Oklahoma State and NBA's Vancouver Grizzlies
- Allie Reynolds (1917–1994), pitcher, Baseball Hall of Famer
- Crystal Robinson (born 1974), New York Liberty, WNBA basketball player
- Bullet Rogan (1893–1967), Baseball Hall of Famer
- Matt Roney (born 1980), MLB relief pitcher
- Jim Ross (born 1952), WWE announcer
- Darrell Royal (1924–2012), football coach at Texas, College Football Hall of Fame
- T. J. Rushing (born 1983), cornerback and return specialist for Detroit Lions
- John Russell (born 1961), bench coach for Baltimore Orioles
- Rex Ryan (born 1962), head coach for Buffalo Bills, New York Jets
- Rob Ryan (born 1962), NFL defensive coordinator

S–Z

- Barry Sanders (born 1968), running back, OSU Heisman Trophy winner, Pro Football Hall of Famer
- Spec Sanders (1919–2003), football player for New York Yankees (AAFC) and New York Yanks
- Bill Self (born 1962), basketball coach at University of Kansas
- Lee Roy Selmon (1954–2011), OU and NFL player, Pro Football Hall of Fame
- Sterling Shepard (born 1993), wide receiver for the New York Giants
- Jeremy Shockey (born 1980), tight end for New Orleans Saints
- Billy Sims (born 1955), running back OU and Detroit Lions, Heisman Trophy winner
- Antonio Smith (born 1981), defensive end for Denver Broncos
- John Smith (born 1965), two-time NCAA champion at OSU, four-time World and two-time Olympic gold medalist, NCAA and Olympic wrestling coach, Distinguished Member of National Wrestling Hall of Fame
- Pat Smith (born 1970), younger brother of John Smith, first ever four-time NCAA Wrestling Division I Champion
- Reggie Smith (born 1986), safety for Carolina Panthers
- Warren Spahn (1921–2003), pitcher, Baseball Hall of Famer
- Willie Stargell (1940–2001), outfielder, Baseball Hall of Famer with Pittsburgh Pirates
- John Starks (born 1965), basketball player for New York Knicks
- Cory Sullivan (born 1979), outfielder for Houston Astros
- Eddie Sutton (1936–2020), Arkansas and OSU basketball coach
- Jack Swagger (born 1982), OU and WWE professional wrestler
- Barry Switzer (born 1937), football coach, OU and Dallas Cowboys
- Brian Tallet (born 1977), relief pitcher for St. Louis Cardinals
- Ralph Terry (born 1936), pitcher, primarily with New York Yankees
- Jim Thorpe (1887–1953), athlete, Olympic gold medalist, played professional football and Major League Baseball; born in Prague, Oklahoma
- Spencer Tillman (born 1964), All-American running back for OU, TV analyst
- Wayman Tisdale (1964–2009), professional basketball player and jazz musician
- Bob Tway (born 1959), professional golfer, 1986 PGA Championship winner
- Kevin Tway (born 1988), professional golfer
- Ekpe Udoh (born 1987), player for Milwaukee Bucks
- Jack van Bebber (1907–1986), Olympic gold medalist in freestyle wrestling
- J. D. Walton (born 1987), center for New York Giants
- Lloyd "Little Poison" Waner (1906–1982), Baseball Hall of Famer
- Paul "Big Poison" Waner (1903–1965), Baseball Hall of Famer
- "Cowboy" Bill Watts (born 1939), professional wrestler and promoter
- J.C. Watts (born 1957), OU quarterback and U.S. congressman
- Brandon Weeden (born 1983), quarterback for Houston Texans
- Wes Welker (born 1981), wide receiver for Denver Broncos
- Wayne Wells (born 1946), Olympic gold medalist and World champion in freestyle wrestling, first ever Nike signature athlete
- Jason White (born 1980), OU quarterback, Heisman Trophy winner
- Bud Wilkinson (1916–1994), OU coach, College Football Hall of Fame
- Shelby Wilson (born 1937), Olympic gold medalist in freestyle wrestling
- Shelden Williams (born 1983), former NBA player
- Eli Willits (born 2007), shortstop, first overall 2025 draft pick of the Washington Nationals
- Reggie Willits (born 1981), left fielder for the Los Angeles Angels
- Matt Wiman (born 1983), UFC fighter
- James Winchester (born 1989), long snapper for Kansas City Chiefs
- Jamey Wright (born 1974), MLB relief pitcher
- Kenyatta Wright (born 1978), NFL linebacker from Vian, Oklahoma
- Trae Young (born 1998), NBA All-Star point guard for the Atlanta Hawks

== Authors ==
- William Bernhardt (born 1960), novelist
- John Berryman (1914–1972), poet
- Cleora Butler (1901–1985), chef, caterer and cookbook writer
- Ralph Ellison (1914–1994), writer and scholar
- Martin Gardner (1914–2010), author specializing in recreational mathematics
- Tony Hillerman (1925–2008), journalist, historian, professor, and novelist
- S.E. Hinton (born 1948), author and novelist
- Nicole Jordan (born 1954), author
- Oliver LaGrone (1906–1995), sculptor, poet, educator and humanitarian
- Louis L'Amour (1908–1988), western novelist
- Billie Letts (1938–2014), novelist
- Tracy Letts (born 1965), playwright, screenwriter, actor
- N. Scott Momaday (born 1964), author, printmaker
- Bill Moyers (1934–2025), journalist and public commentator
- Jason Nelson (born 1970), internet artist and digital poet
- Wilson Rawls (1913–1984), author
- Jeff Rowland (born 1974), cartoonist, author of WIGU
- Josh Shipp (born 1981), author and motivational speaker
- Jim Thompson (1906–1977), novelist

== Aviators and astronauts ==
- Thomas and Paul Revere Braniff Paul Braniff, airline entrepreneurs, founders of Braniff International Airways
- Jerrie Cobb (1931-2019) award winning aviatrix; Mercury 13
- Gordon Cooper (1927–2006), astronaut
- Owen K. Garriott (1930–2019), astronaut
- John Herrington (Chickasaw, born 1958), astronaut
- James Jabara (1923–1966), world's first jet ace, and Korean War triple ace with 15 kills
- Shannon Lucid (born 1943), astronaut
- William R. Pogue (1930–2014), astronaut
- Wiley Post (1898–1935), first pilot to fly solo around the world (born in Texas but grew up in Oklahoma)
- Will Rogers (Cherokee, 1879–1935), aviator
- Thomas Stafford (1930–2024), astronaut
- Clarence L. Tinker (Osage, 1887–1942), U.S. Army Air Corps general and supreme commander of the U.S. Army Air Corps in the Pacific during World War II

== Businesspeople ==
- Rick Bayless (born 1953), restaurateur, chef, PBS television personality
- Clay Bennett (born 1959), chairman, Dorchester Capital; owner, Oklahoma City Thunder
- Sherman Billingsley (1896–1966), owner of Stork Club
- James A. Chapman (1881–1966), oil industry businessman
- Edward K. Gaylord (1873–1974), founder, Daily Oklahoman
- Edward L. Gaylord (1919–2003), editor, Daily Oklahoman; founder, TNN & CMT; owner, Grand Ole Opry
- Sylvan Goldman (1898–1984), businessman and inventor of the shopping cart
- David Green (born 1941), businessman, philanthropist, founder of Hobby Lobby
- J. M. Hall (1851–1935), merchant and pioneer of Tulsa, Oklahoma
- Harold Hamm (born 1945), philanthropist, oil tycoon, founder and chairman Continental Resources
- George Kaiser (born 1942), chairman of BOK Financial Corporation
- W. W. Keeler (Cherokee, 1908–1987), principal Chief of Cherokee Nation, president and CEO of Phillips Petroleum Company (1968–1973)
- Henry Kravis (born 1944), co-founder of Kohlberg Kravis Roberts & Co.
- Eugene Lorton (1868–1949), owner, publisher and editor of Tulsa World
- James H. McBirney (1870–1944), founder and president, National Bank of Commerce
- Sam P. McBirney (1877–1936), founder and vice president, National Bank of Commerce, Tulsa
- Robert M. McFarlin (1866–1942), oil industry businessman
- Neal Patterson (1949–2017), chief executive officer, Cerner Corporation; owner, Sporting Kansas City soccer team
- Waite Phillips (1883–1964), oil industry businessman
- T. Boone Pickens Jr. (1928–2019), oil industry businessman
- Chad Richison (born 1970), founder and CEO of Paycom
- William Skelly (1878–1957), founder of Skelly Oil Company and Spartan School of Aeronautics
- B. Kevin Turner (born 1965), former COO of Microsoft, CEO of Sam's Club and CIO of Walmart
- Helen Walton (1919–2007), wife of Sam Walton, once richest woman in the world
- Sam Walton (1918–1992), founder of Wal-Mart
- Tom L. Ward, oil industry businessman
- William K. Warren, Sr. (1897–1990), oil industry businessman, founder of Warren Petroleum and St. Francis Hospital in Tulsa

== Comedians ==
- Bill Hader (born 1978), actor, producer, director, writer comedian
- Megan Mullally (born 1958), actress, comedian, dancer, singer
- Alexander Posey (Muscogee Creek, 1873–1908), poet, humorist, politician
- Tony Randall (1920–2004), actor, comedian
- Will Rogers (Cherokee, 1879–1935), humorist
- Harris Wittels (1984–2015), television writer, comedian

== Criminals ==
- Robert and Michael Bever, brothers who were convicted of murdering their parents and three siblings
- Cattle Annie (1882–1978), female bandit of the American Old West
- Little Britches (born 1879; year of death unknown), female bandit, companion in crime with Cattle Annie

== Miss America winners ==
- Jennifer Berry (born 1983), Miss America 2006
- Jane Anne Jayroe (born 1946), Miss America 1967
- Lauren Nelson (born 1987), Miss America 2007
- Susan Powell (born 1959), Miss America 1981
- Norma Smallwood (Cherokee, 1909–1966), Miss America 1926, first Miss America of Native American heritage
- Shawntel Smith (born 1971), Miss America 1996

== Military and political figures ==
- Carl Albert (1908–2000), speaker of the United States House of Representatives 1971–1977; born in McAlester, reared in Bugtussle, Oklahoma
- Bob Ballinger (born 1974), Republican member of the Arkansas House of Representatives; reared in Tulsa
- Dewey F. Bartlett, Sr. (1919–1979), Oklahoma governor and U.S. senator
- Dan Boren (born 1973), represents Oklahoma's 2nd Congressional district in the U.S. House
- David Boren (born 1941), former governor of Oklahoma, U.S. senator and University of Oklahoma president
- Donna Campbell (born 1954), physician and member of the Texas Senate; reared in Oklahoma
- Joseph J. Clark (Cherokee, 1893–1971), admiral in U.S. Navy and first Native American to graduate from the United States Naval Academy
- Tom Coburn (1948–2020), physician who served as a United States representative and United States senator from Oklahoma, reared in Muskogee, Oklahoma
- William J. Crowe (1925–2007), admiral in U.S. Navy and former chairman of the U.S. Joint Chiefs of Staff
- Drew Edmondson (born 1946), state attorney general
- General Tommy Franks (born 1945), commander of US Central Command, US Invasions of Afghanistan and Iraq
- Bo Gritz (born 1939), most decorated Green Beret officer during the Vietnam War
- Enoch Kelly Haney (Seminole, born 1940), senator for state of Oklahoma, campaign manager for George Nigh during his first successful bid for governor, principal chief of the Seminole Nation of Oklahoma, artist, sculptor, historian, businessman
- Patrick J. Hurley (1883–1963), U.S. secretary of war under President Herbert Hoover
- Jeane Kirkpatrick (1926–2006), U.S. ambassador to the United Nations
- William Flynn Martin (born 1950), deputy secretary of Energy and executive secretary of the United States National Security Council
- Jake McNiece (born 1919), former member of the Filthy Thirteen; inspiration behind E. M. Nathanson novel and the 1967 film The Dirty Dozen
- Perle Mesta (1889–1975), political hostess, U.S. ambassador to Luxembourg
- A. S. Mike Monroney (1902–1980), U.S. senator, sponsor of the Automobile Information Disclosure Act of 1958
- Daniel Patrick Moynihan (1927–2003), U.S. senator, ambassador to India, ambassador to the United Nations
- Donald Lee "Don" Nickles (born 1948), U.S. senator from Oklahoma 1981–2005
- George Nigh (born 1927), two-time governor of Oklahoma
- Tony Perkins (born 1963), director of the Family Research Council and former member of the Louisiana House of Representatives
- Riley L. Pitts (1937–1967), U.S. Army Medal of Honor recipient
- Dennis Reimer (born 1939), four-star general, chief of staff of the U.S. Army
- Alice Mary Robertson (1854–1931), educator, social worker, government official, and politician
- Apollo Soucek (1897–1955), test pilot and vice admiral, U.S. Navy, born in Medford, Oklahoma
- Gene Stipe (1926–2012), longest-serving member of the Oklahoma State Senate, from McAlester, Oklahoma
- Clarence L. Tinker (1887–1942), Air Force major general killed in action in World War II
- Elizabeth Warren (born 1949), US senator for Massachusetts, special advisor for the Consumer Financial Protection Bureau
- J.C. Watts (born 1957), former U.S. representative in the majority leadership; Oklahoma Sooners quarterback
- Neil Woodward (born 1962), naval officer, former NASA astronaut
- Jim Woolsey (born 1941), former director of Central Intelligence and head of the CIA (1993–1995)

== Musicians ==
- AleXa (born 1996), K-pop idol based in Seoul
- Hoyt Axton (1938–1999), country music singer-songwriter, wrote "Never Been to Spain"
- Chet Baker (1929–1988), jazz trumpeter who helped popularize 1950s cool jazz style
- Molly Bee (1939–2009), country singer
- Florence Birdwell (1924–2021), voice teacher to Broadway stars
- Elvin Bishop (born 1942), singer-songwriter; from Tulsa; hit record "Fooled Around and Fell in Love"
- Bob Bogle (1934–2009), bassist and founding member of The Ventures, member of Rock and Roll Hall of Fame
- Earl Bostic (1913–1965), R&B and jazz musician
- Garth Brooks (born 1962), country music singer-songwriter
- Zach Bryan (born 1996), singer-songwriter
- Anita Jane Bryant (born 1940), singer, former Miss Oklahoma
- Don Byas (1912–1972), jazz tenor saxophonist; a leading musician of swing and bebop eras
- JJ Cale (1938–2013), country rock (see Tulsa sound)
- Jerry Cantrell (born 1966), musician, lead guitarist and vocalist, Alice in Chains
- Henson Cargill (1941–2007), country music singer
- Gary Chapman (born 1957), Contemporary Christian musician
- Don Cherry (1936–1995), pioneering free jazz trumpeter
- Charlie Christian (1916–1942), jazz guitarist, member of Rock and Roll Hall of Fame, considered father of jazz guitar
- Roy Clark (1933–2018), country musician
- Spade Cooley (1910–1969), western swing musician
- Wayne Coyne (born 1961), member, indie rock band The Flaming Lips
- Jesse Ed Davis (Kiowa-Comanche, 1944–1988), Taj Mahal band, session musician post-Beatles, born in Norman
- Bob Dunn (1908–1971), musician, early pioneer of electric guitar; from Beggs, Oklahoma
- Ronnie Dunn (born 1953), half of country music duo Brooks & Dunn
- Nokie Edwards (1935–2018), lead guitarist of The Ventures, member of Rock and Roll Hall of Fame
- Gail Farrell (born 1947), singer-songwriter, featured performer from The Lawrence Welk Show
- John Fullbright (born 1988), singer-songwriter; from Bearden
- David Gates (born 1940), singer-songwriter associated with the band Bread
- Vince Gill (born 1957), country musician
- Earl Grant (1933–1970), easy listening pianist
- Woody Guthrie (1912–1967), folk singer
- Chasen Hampton (born 1975), singer-songwriter from band The Party
- Isaac Hanson (born 1980), guitarist and singer-songwriter from band Hanson
- Taylor Hanson (born 1983), pianist and lead singer-songwriter from band Hanson
- Zac Hanson (born 1985), drummer and singer-songwriter from band Hanson
- Glen Hardin (born 1939), musician, piano player
- Roy Harris (1898–1979), classical composer
- Richard Hart (born 1955), jazz guitarist, composer, arranger, published artist
- Wade Hayes (born 1969), country music artist
- Lee Hazlewood (1929–2007), singer-songwriter, record producer
- Michael Hedges (1953–1997), acoustic guitarist, born in Enid, Oklahoma
- Wanda Jackson (born 1938), rockabilly singer, born in Maud, Oklahoma
- Brett James (born 1968), country singer-songwriter
- Toby Keith (1961–2024), country musician
- Barney Kessel (1923–2004), jazz guitarist
- Merle Kilgore (1934–2005), singer-songwriter, manager
- Edward Knight (born 1961), composer, music educator
- Tosca Kramer (1903–1976), violinist, violist, music educator
- Fredell Lack (1922–2017), violinist
- Mel McDaniel (1942–2011), country music singer-songwriter
- Reba McEntire (born 1955), country singer
- Susie McEntire (born 1957), inspirational country singer and storyteller
- Jay McShann (1916–2006), jazz pianist and bandleader
- Roger Miller (1936–1992), singer-songwriter
- Leona Mitchell (born 1948), African-American soprano; Grammy Award winner, member, Oklahoma Music Hall of Fame
- Norma Jean (born Norma Jean Beasler in 1938), country music singer
- Jamie Oldaker (1951–2020), rock n roll drummer
- Patti Page (1927–2013), traditional pop and country music singer
- Sandi Patty (born 1957), contemporary Christian music singer2004)
- Tom Paxton (born 1937), singer-songwriter
- Robt Ptak (born 1970), singer-songwriter
- Ben Rector (born 1986), pop singer-songwriter
- Steve Ripley (1950–2019), songwriter, studio engineer, guitarist, and inventor, leader of rock band The Tractors
- Tyson Ritter (born 1984), vocalist of rock band The All-American Rejects and actor
- Sam Rivers (1923–2011), jazz tenor saxophonist with Miles Davis, Dizzy Gillespie, Herbie Hancock, and Quincy Jones
- Joe Don Rooney (born 1975), country music singer, one-third of group Rascal Flatts
- Leon Russell (1942–2016), singer-songwriter, pianist and guitarist
- Jacob Sartorius (born 2002), popular singer on YouTube and Music.ly
- Neal Schon (born 1954), lead rock guitarist of Journey
- Mark Selby (1961–2017), blues rock musician
- Blake Shelton (born 1976), country musician
- John Simmons (1918–1979), jazz bassist
- Kay Starr (1922–2016), pop and jazz singer
- Ryan Tedder (born 1979), frontman, pop rock band OneRepublic
- B. J. Thomas (1942–2021), singer-songwriter (singer of "Raindrops Keep Fallin' on My Head")
- Carrie Underwood (born 1983), country music singer-songwriter, American Idol 2005 winner
- Lushanya Vinay (1906–1990), born Tessie Mobley, operatic soprano of Chickasaw descent, raised in Ardmore, Oklahoma
- Kitt Wakeley, Grammy-nominated musician, born in Holdenville, OK
- Jimmy Webb (born 1946), popular music composer
- Bryan White (born 1974), country music singer
- Claude Williams (1908–2004), jazz musician, Count Basie band
- Mason Williams (born 1938), composer ("Classical Gas"), recording artist, comedy writer (Smothers Brothers)
- Bob Wills (1905–1975), country music singer-songwriter, leader of band The Texas Playboys
- Austin Winkler (born 1981), former lead singer for rock band Hinder
- Sheb Wooley (1921–2003), actor (High Noon) and singer ("Purple People Eater")

== Native Americans ==
- Bill Anoatubby (born 1945), governor of the Chickasaw Nation
- Lisa Johnson Billy (born 1967), Oklahoma state legislator; first female Native American elected to HD 42; one of the founders of the Native American Caucus; Chickasaw Indian
- Black Kettle (1801/07–1868), Cheyenne chief killed near Cheyenne, Oklahoma, in Roger Mills County
- T.C. Cannon (Kiowa/Caddo, 1946–1978), 20th-century Native American artist and poet
- Yvonne Chouteau (Shawnee Tribe, 1929–2016), prima ballerina, youngest dancer ever accepted to Ballet Russe de Monte Carlo
- Joseph J. Clark (Cherokee Nation, 1893–1971), admiral in U.S. Navy
- George W. Harkins (Choctaw (1810–1861), attorney, judge, Chief of the Apukshunnubbee District
- Wilma Mankiller (1945–2010), first woman principal chief of the Cherokee Nation
- Doris McLemore (Wichita, 1927–2016), last speaker of the Wichita language
- Quanah Parker (Comanche, c. late 1840s–1911), chief and co-founder of the Native American Church
- Peter Pitchlynn (Choctaw, 1806–1881), provisional Choctaw chief, Choctaw delegate to Washington, D.C.; buried in the Congressional Cemetery
- Pleasant Porter (Muscogee, 1840–1907), Muscogee (Creek) Nation principal chief
- Harvey Pratt (Southern Cheyenne, 1941–2025), Native American forensic artist, Cheyenne peace chief
- Will Rogers (Cherokee, 1879–1935), humorist, actor, author, aviator, movie producer
- John Ross (Cherokee, 1790–1866), principal chief of the Cherokee Nation, buried at Park Hill, Oklahoma
- Steve Russell (born 1947), Cherokee, poet, academic (emeritus professor), journalist and trial judge
- Sequoyah (Cherokee, 1776–1842), lived in what is now Sequoyah County; blacksmith, teacher, inventor of the Cherokee syllabary
- Maria Tallchief (Osage Nation, 1925–2013), first American prima ballerina
- Marjorie Tallchief (Osage Nation, 1926–2021), ballerina
- Clarence L. Tinker (Osage Nation, 1887–1942), U.S. Army Air Corps general, first American general to die in World War II
- Fred Waite (Chickasaw, 1853–1895), cowboy, member of Billy the Kid's gang and politician
- Della Warrior (Otoe-Missouria, born 1946), first female chairperson of the Otoe-Missouria Tribe of Indians, president of the Institute of American Indian Arts, executive director of the Museum of Indian Arts and Culture
- Stand Watie (Cherokee, 1806–1871), brigadier general in the Confederate Army, chief

== Radio and television personalities ==
- Rick Bayless (born 1953), chef and television personality
- Skip Bayless (born 1951), sports journalist
- Douglas Edwards (1917–1990), radio and television journalist
- Gary England (born 1939), chief meteorologist for KWTV Channel 9
- Kathy Lee Gifford (born 1953), television personality, Oral Roberts graduate
- Kayne Gillaspie (born 1979), television personality and fashion designer
- Mary Hart (born 1950), television personality, co-host of Entertainment Tonight
- Paul Harvey (1918–2009), radio broadcaster and commentator
- Glenn Hauser (born 1945), radio broadcaster
- Phil McGraw (born 1950), television psychologist
- Bill Moyers (born 1934), television journalist
- Bob Murphy (1924–2004), sportscaster, play-by-play for New York Mets
- Ross Porter (born 1938), longtime broadcaster for Los Angeles Dodgers
- Dan Rowan (1922–1987), comedian, Rowan & Martin's Laugh-In
- Judy Woodruff (born 1946), television journalist

== Scientists, including medicine ==
- Richard E. Berendzen (born 1938), astronomer, author, and professor
- Kenneth H. Cooper (born 1931), physician, United States Air Force officer, pioneer of aerobics
- David Deming (born 1954), PhD, author, professor of geology, and political commentator
- Edwin R. Gilliland (1909–1973), chemical engineer and professor
- Lyle Goodhue (1903–1981), research chemist and inventor
- Karl Guthe Jansky (1905–1950), physicist and radio engineer
- Dr. Donna J. Nelson (born 1954), OU chemistry professor, 2016 ACS president, and science advisor to Breaking Bad
- Donna Shirley (born 1941), aerospace engineer, Mars Exploration Program Manager, Jet Propulsion Laboratory
- Dr. Reed Timmer (born 1980), extreme meteorologist, storm chaser
- John York (born 1949), cancer research pathologist

== Religious figures ==
- Wade Burleson (born 1961), lead pastor of Emmanuel Enid (1992–present) and president of the Baptist General Convention of Oklahoma (2002–2004)
- Finis Alonzo Crutchfield (1916–1987), Methodist minister and Bishop of Oklahoma
- Paul Vernon Galloway (1904–1990), Methodist minister and Bishop of Texas, Arkansas and Louisiana
- Jerry Johnston (born 1959), Southern Baptist clergyman and university administrator, born in Oklahoma City
- Charles William Kerr (1875–1951), first permanent Protestant minister in Tulsa, Oklahoma
- Robert McGill Loughridge (1809–1900), Presbyterian missionary
- Quanah Parker (Comanche, 1852–1911), Native American Church leader and advocate
- Oral Roberts (1918–2009), evangelist
- Stanley Rother (1935–1981), first U.S.-born priest and martyr to be beatified by Roman Catholic church
- John Wilson (Caddo) (ca. 1840–1901), Native American Church roadman
- Yahweh ben Yahweh (born Hulon Mitchell Jr.) (1935–2007), leader of religious group Nation of Yahweh

== Visual artists ==
- Joe Andoe (born 1955), painter
- Fred Beaver (Seminole/Muscogee, 1911–1980), painter, printmaker
- Charles Bell (1935–1995), photorealist painter
- Acee Blue Eagle (Muscogee, 1907–1959), artist
- Carolyn Brady (1937–2005), artist
- Joe Brainard (1942–1994), artist
- T.C. Cannon (Kiowa/Caddo, 1946–1978), artist
- Larry Clark (born 1943), photographer, filmmaker
- Woody Crumbo (Citizen Potawatomi, 1912–1989), artist
- Joseph Glasco (1925–1996), abstract expressionist artist
- Joe Goode (born 1937), artist
- Chester Gould (1900–1985), creator of the Dick Tracy comic strip
- Stephen Hillenburg (1961–2018), cartoonist, creator of SpongeBob SquarePants
- Allan Houser (Chiricahua Apache, 1914–1994), sculptor
- Robert McMurtry (1950–2012), painter, author
- Jason Nelson (born 1970), internet artist and digital poet
- Gary Panter (born 1950), illustrator, painter and designer
- Joe A. Rector (1935–2012), artist
- Ed Ruscha (born 1937), artist
- David Salle (born 1952), artist
- Leon Polk Smith (European-American, 1906–1996), artist
- Willard Stone (1916–1985), sculptor and woocdarver

== Other ==
- Bobby Baldwin (born c. 1950), professional poker player
- Daniel J. Boorstin (1914–2004), historian, professor, attorney, and writer
- Tom Colbert (born 1949), first African-American Oklahoma Supreme Court justice
- Kim Davenport (born 1955), professional pool player
- David Duke (born 1950), white nationalist, politician, antisemitic conspiracy theorist
- Ben Graf Henneke (1914–1999), educator; president, University of Tulsa
- Anita Hill (born 1956), professor of social policy, law, and women's studies who testified at the U.S. Senate confirmation hearings of Clarence Thomas
- Sherri Hill (born 1949), fashion designer; grew up in Minco
- Ray William Johnson (born 1981), Internet comedian and musician
- Stephen Jones (born 1940), attorney; Timothy McVeigh's lead defense lawyer during McVeigh's trial for the Oklahoma City bombing
- Robert L. Lynn (1931–2020), college administrator and president, journalist and poet; reared in Carter County
- Charles ("Chuck") W. Mooney Jr. (born 1947), the Charles A. Heimbold Jr. Professor of Law, and former interim dean, at the University of Pennsylvania Law School
- Charles Page (1860–1920), philanthropist and founder of Sand Springs, Oklahoma
- Joe Redington (1917–1999), "Father of the Iditarod Trail Sled Dog Race"
- Bass Reeves (1838–1910), first African-American U.S. marshal and one of the chief law enforcement agents in early Oklahoma
- Kevin Samuels (born 1966), YouTuber
- Steven W. Taylor (born 1949), Oklahoma Supreme Court justice, presided over Oklahoma City bombing suspect Terry Nichols's state murder trial
- Cornel West (born 1953), scholar
- Kathleen Zellner, attorney

== See also ==
- List of Oklahoma suffragists
- List of Northeastern State University alumni
- List of Oklahoma State University people
- List of people from Enid, Oklahoma
- List of people from Muskogee, Oklahoma
- List of people from Norman, Oklahoma
- List of people from Oklahoma City
- List of people from Tulsa, Oklahoma
- List of University of Central Oklahoma people
- List of University of Oklahoma people
- List of University of Tulsa people
- Lists of Americans
