= List of University of Central Oklahoma people =

The list of University of Central Oklahoma alumni includes notable alumni, non-matriculating students, and former faculty of the University of Central Oklahoma.

== Notable alumni ==
=== Activists ===
- Elma Holder, elder rights activist

=== Arts and entertainment ===
- Scott Booker, manager of The Flaming Lips; executive director of ACM@UCO
- T. C. Cannon (Kiowa/Caddo, 1946–1978), painter and printmaker
- Stan Case, CNN Radio and Headline News anchor
- Dave Garrett, former New Orleans Saints and Dallas Cowboys radio broadcaster
- Bill Glass Jr. (Cherokee Nation), ceramic artist and sculptor
- Milena Govich, actress, TV series Law & Order
- Hinder, multi-platinum rock group, all four members
- Jamie McGuire, author
- Lauren Nelson, Miss America 2007
- Betty Lou Shipley, Poet Laureate of Oklahoma, 1997–98
- W. K. Stratton, author
- Emoly West, Miss Oklahoma 2010

=== Athletics ===
- Joe Aska, former NFL player
- Hap Barnard, former NFL player (1938–1938)
- Bob Briggs, former NFL player (1965–1965)
- Clifford Chatman, former NFL player (1982–1982)
- Ken Corley, former BBA/NBA basketball player
- Jermelle Cudjo, football player, St. Louis Rams
- Tim Elliott, mixed martial artist, currently with the Ultimate Fighting Championship, wrestled at Central Oklahoma
- Robin Freeman, PGA Tour and Champions Tour golfer
- A. J. Haglund, former NFL player
- Jared Hess, All-American wrestler, retired professional MMA fighter
- Muhammed Lawal, NCAA Division II National Champion (2002), current MMA fighter, formerly for Strikeforce and now Bellator Fighting Championship
- J. W. Lockett, former NFL player (1961–1964) and CFL player (1965–1966)
- Eddie Robinson, former NBA player
- John Sterling, former NFL player
- Hurley Tarver, former NFL player
- Keith Traylor, former NFL player
- Derek Ware, former NFL player (1992–1996)

=== Business ===
- Bijan Allipour, Iranian business executive; CEO of NISOC
- Chad Richison, founder, president and CEO of Paycom
- Randall L. Stephenson, (CEO and chairman of AT&T

=== Science and technology ===
- Dr. Dwight E. Adams, former director of the FBI Laboratory; member of the FBI's research team that developed the DNA techniques first used in 1988; recipient of 2003 Presidential Rank Award; director of the University of Central Oklahoma Forensic Science Institute
- Milt Heflin, first chief flight director; former general director, NASA, Johnson Space Center

=== Politics and government ===
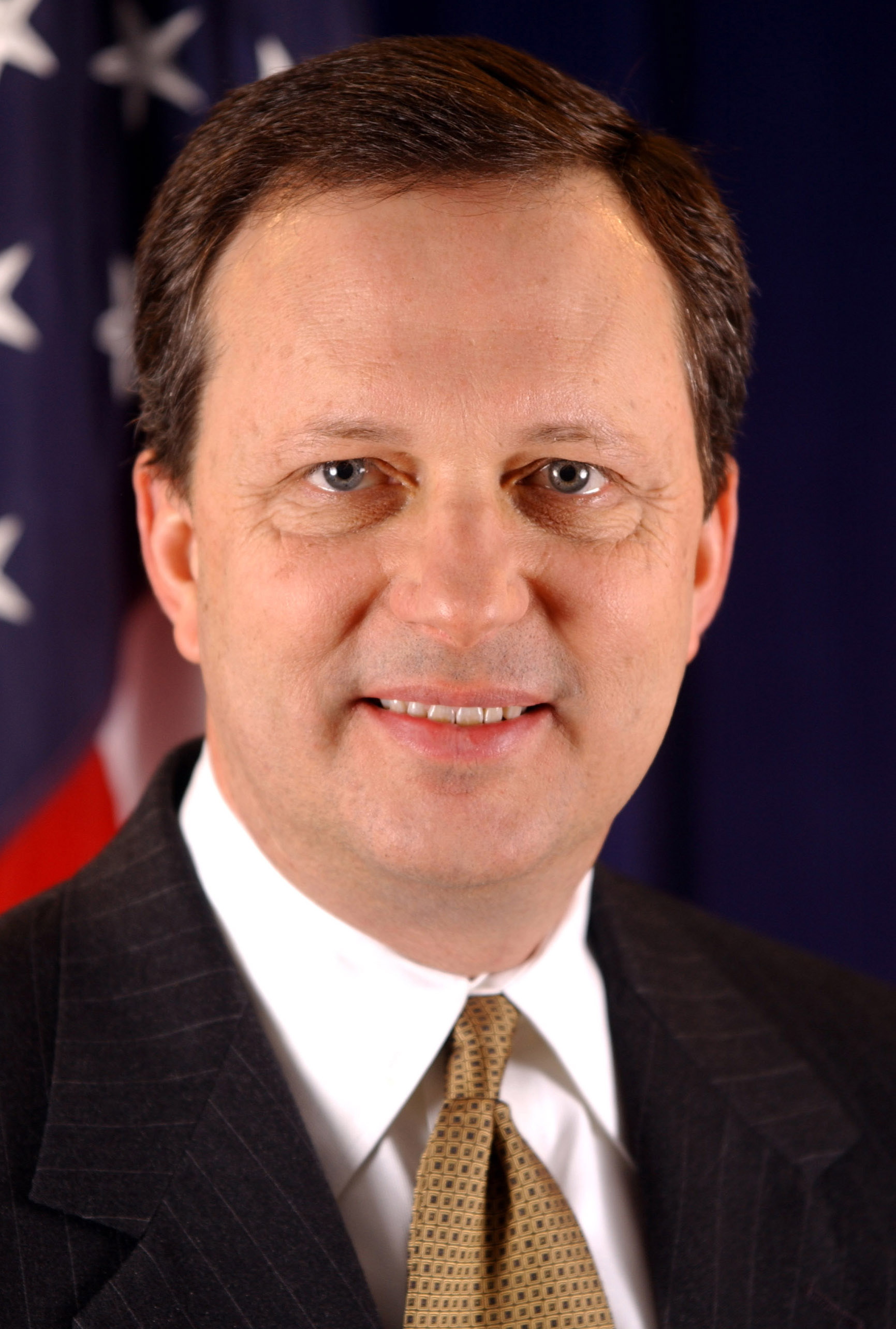
Michael D. Brown

- Michael D. Brown, former FEMA director
- Donna Campbell, member of the Texas Senate; emergency room physician in New Braunfels, Texas; received bachelor's degree in nursing, c. 1976
- Mary Fallin, former governor of Oklahoma
- Danny Morgan, Oklahoma state representative and leader of the Oklahoma House Democratic Caucus
- Kevin Ward, Oklahoma Secretary of Safety and Security and Oklahoma Commissioner of Public Safety

== Notable faculty ==
- James Bidlack, professor of Biology, president of Metabolism Foundation; vice president and chief science officer of Genome Registry
