= Free (The Party album) =

Studio album by The Party
- Released: August 25, 1992
- Recorded: 1991–1992
- Studio: M'Bila Studios (Hollywood, CA); Saturn Studio
- Genre: Dance-pop
- Length: 1:02:09
- Language: English; Spanish
- Label: Hollywood
- Producer: Andre Williams; Bernard Edwards; Demetrius Shipp; Dr. Dre; Elliot Wolff; Freddy Bastone; Julian Raymond; Keith Williams; LaVaba Mallison; Michael Verdick; Paul Jackson Jr.; Stephen Bray; The Party; Thomas Taliaferro

The Party chronology
In the Meantime, In Between Time (1991)	Free (1992)	The Party's Over...Thanks for Coming (1993)

Singles from Free
- 1. "Free" Released: August 20, 1992; 2. "All About Love" Released: February 4, 1993

Professional ratings
Review scores
Source	Rating
AllMusic	3/5 stars

Free is the second studio album by American pop quintet the Party. It was released in 1992 via Hollywood Records. The album debuted at number 163 on the Billboard 200 albums chart in the United States.

== Background ==
Teddy Riley wrote three songs for the album, including the new jack swing-tinged title song "Free", which was also remixed by house music legends Steve "Silk" Hurley and E-Smoove. The group itself also got involved in the writing and producing of the album, alongside Paul Jackson Jr., Julian Raymond, Stephen Bray, Andre Williams, Bernard Edwards, Demetrius Shipp, Dr. Dre, Elliot Wolff, Freddy Bastone, Keith Williams, LaVaba Mallison, Michael Verdick and Thomas Taliaferro. Thus would once again land it another concert tour opening spot with Color Me Badd, its last special for the Disney Channel, "All About The Party", and an appearance on Blossom. However, the album was not as successful on the charts as previous ones, which prompted Damon Pampolina to leave the group.

== Track listing ==
No.	Title	Writer(s)	Producer(s)	Length
1.	"Free"	LaVaba Mallison; Teddy Riley; Jerrold Holmes	LaVaba Mallison	4:29
2.	"Change on Me"	Deedee Magno Hall; Tiffini Hale; Andre Williams; Keith Williams; Reggie Turner	Stephen Bray	3:42
3.	"All About Love"	T. Riley; Markell Riley; Omar Chandler	Demetrius Shipp	4:40
4.	"I Want You"	Damon Pampolina; Hale; Freddy Bastone; DJ Dino; Frankie Z.; MC Gizmo	Julian Raymond	3:40
5.	"In My Life"	Clyde Lieberman; Jeff Pescetto; Richard James Burgess	Freddy Bastone	4:51
6.	"Where Is My Romeo"	Jeff Slater; Wayne Hammer	Paul Jackson Jr.; Julian Raymond (add. voc.)	4:32
7.	"Frontin'"	Albert Fields; Pampolina; André Cymone; Charles Bobbit; Fred Wesley; James Brown; John Starks	Andre Williams; Keith Williams; Albert Fields (co.); Damon Pampolina (co.)	4:06
8.	"Let's Get Right Down to It"	Andre Young; Colin Wolfe	Dr. Dre; Colin Wolfe (co.)	3:28
9.	"At All Times"	Thomas Taliaferro; T. Riley	Thomas Taliaferro	4:04
10.	"It's Out of My Heart"	Michele Vice-Maslin; Scott Cutler	Paul Jackson Jr.	4:52
11.	"Needin' Someone"	Chase Hampton; Clif Magness	Stephen Bray; Michael Verdick	4:17
12.	"Independent Woman"	Paul Guidry; Romany Malco	Bernard Edwards; Julian Raymond (add.)	3:50
13.	"Cappuccino and Bacon"	Hall; Hale; Pampolina; Fields; Hampton	The Party	2:08
14.	"Life Ain't Nothin' But a Party"	Hall; Hale; Pampolina; Fields; Hampton; Elliot Wolff	Elliot Wolff	3:49
15.	"Quien Es Mi Romeo"	Slater; Hammer	Paul Jackson Jr.; Julian Raymond (voc.); Kathie Davidson (add. voc.)	4:32
Total length:				1:02:09

Sample credits

- Track 7 contains a sample of "Poppa Don't Take Any Mess" performed by James Brown.

== Personnel ==
- Deedee Magno Hall – lead vocals (tracks: 1, 2, 4, 5, 7, 9, 14), backing vocals, organ & producer (track 13)
- Damon Pampolina – lead vocals (tracks: 1, 4, 7, 10, 14), backing vocals, drums & producer (track 13), co-producer (track 7)
- Albert Fields – lead vocals (tracks: 3, 7, 8, 10, 14), backing vocals, bass guitar & producer (track 13), co-producer (track 7)
- Tiffini Hale – lead vocals (tracks: 6, 8, 12, 14, 15), backing vocals, percussion & producer (track 13)
- Chase Hampton – lead vocals (tracks: 1, 5, 11, 14), backing vocals, guitar & producer (track 13)
- Paul Jackson Jr. – additional backing vocals (track 10), guitar (tracks: 6, 10, 11, 15), keyboards & bass (tracks: 6, 10, 15), drums (tracks: 6, 15), producer & engineering (tracks: 6, 10, 15), programming (track 10)
- David Williams – guitar (tracks: 2, 12)
- Tim Pierce – guitar (track 2)
- Raymond Chan – keyboards (track 2)
- Jeff Lorber – keyboards & engineering (tracks: 4, 10), programming & additional producer assistance (track 4)
- Byron Jupiter Jr. – scratches (tracks: 4, 7)
- Jerry Peters – keyboards & strings arrangement (tracks: 6, 15)
- Sir Grant – keyboards (tracks: 6, 15)
- Oscar Brashear – trumpet solo (tracks: 6, 15)
- Dave Greenwood – guitar (track 7)
- Eric Priest – guitar (track 8)
- Everette Harp – saxophone solo (track 10)
- Dillon F. Gorman – keyboards & keyboard arrangement (track 11)
- Paulinho da Costa – percussion (track 11)
- Eddie Martinez – guitar (track 12)
- Philippe Saisse – keyboards & drum programming (track 12)
- Bernard Edwards – bass & producer (track 12)
- Bob Wackerman – strings bass (track 12)
- Bennett Salvay – horns arrangement (track 12)
- Steve Elson – baritone saxophone (track 12)
- Stan Harrison – tenor saxophone (track 12)
- Mac Gollehon – trumpet (track 12)
- Denny Fongheiser – drums (track 12)
- LaVaba Mallison – producer (track 1)
- Stephen Bray – producer (tracks: 2, 11)
- Cindi Dietrich – production coordinator (tracks: 2, 11)
- Demetrius Shipp – producer (track 3)
- Julian Raymond – producer (track 4), additional vocal producer (track 6), additional producer (track 12), vocal producer (track 15)
- Freddy Bastone – producer (track 5)
- Andre Williams – producer (track 7)
- Keith Williams – producer (track 7)
- Andre "Dr. Dre" Young – producer & mixing (track 8)
- Colin Wolfe – co-producer (track 8)
- Thomas Taliaferro – producer (track 9)
- Michael Verdick – producer (track 11), mixing (track 5), engineering (tracks: 5, 11)
- Romique Roberts – production coordinator (track 12)
- Elliot Wolff – producer, engineering & tracking (track 14)
- Kathie Davidson – additional vocal producer (track 15)
- Franklyn Grant – engineering (track 1)
- Jean-Marie Horvat – mixing (tracks: 1, 3, 9), engineering (tracks: 3, 9)
- Earl Thomas – engineering assistant (tracks: 1, 9)
- Keston Wright – engineering assistant (tracks: 1, 3, 9)
- Fil Brown – engineering (tracks: 2, 5)
- Brian Malouf – mixing (tracks: 2, 4, 7, 11, 12, 14, 15)
- Dominique Schafer – engineering assistant (tracks: 2, 5, 11)
- Josh Heineman – programming (track 5)
- Conley Abrams – engineering (tracks: 6, 10, 15)
- Jack Benson – engineering (track 7)
- Reggie Turner – synth programming (track 7)
- John Payne – engineering (track 8)
- Rick Clifford – engineering (track 10)
- Craig Burbidge – mixing (track 10)
- Cal Bennett – wind controller (track 11)
- Peter McCabe – engineering (track 12)
- Roy Hendrickson – engineering (track 12)
- Todd Whitelock – engineering assistant (track 12)
- Efrin Espinoza – lyrics translator (track 15)
- Maria DeGrassi-Colosimo – art direction
- Aaron Rapoport – photography
- Laura Ziffren – A&R

== Charts ==
Chart (1992)	Peak position
US Billboard 200	163
