= Tuttle, Oklahoma =

- City
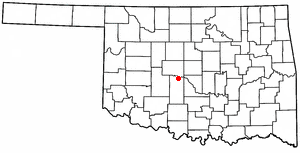
- Location of Tuttle, Oklahoma
- Coordinates: 35°18′25″N 97°45′23″W
- Country: United States
- State: Oklahoma
- County: Grady

Area
  - Total: 29.49 sq mi (76.37 km^{2})
  - Land: 29.48 sq mi (76.36 km^{2})
  - Water: 0.0039 sq mi (0.01 km^{2})
- Elevation: 1,250 ft (380 m)

Population (2020)
  - Total: 7,413
  - Density: 251.5/sq mi (97.09/km^{2})
- Time zone: UTC-6 (Central (CST))
  - Summer (DST): UTC-5 (CDT)
- ZIP code: 73089
- Area code: 405
- FIPS code: 40-75450
- GNIS feature ID: 2412118
- Website: www.tuttleok.gov

Tuttle is a city in Grady County, Oklahoma, United States. The population was 7,413 with the close of the 2020 census, seeing a 23.2% increase from 6,010 in 2010.

== History ==
Located east of the Chisholm Trail, Tuttle was developed as a farming and ranching community. The town was platted in 1901 and the land was purchased Chickasaw land from the Colbert Family. The town is named after local rancher James H. Tuttle, a Choctaw by marriage and the father of automobile dealer and politico Holmes Tuttle.

At the time of its founding, Tuttle was located in Pickens County, Chickasaw Nation.

The right-of-way for the St. Louis and San Francisco Railway came from the tribal allotment of Frances Schrock, a Choctaw. Schrock Park is named after her. Tuttle's post office was established in 1902, and the town was incorporated in 1906.

== Geography ==
According to the United States Census Bureau, the city has a total area of 29.2 square miles (76 km^{2}), all land.

Tuttle, located in a low-lying river basin along the South Canadian River, is considered to be part of a rapidly growing area of northern McClain and Grady Counties known as the "Tri-City Area" with Newcastle and Blanchard.

== Demographics ==
Historical population
| Census | Pop. | Note | %± |
|---|---|---|---|
| 1910 | 794 | | — |
| 1920 | 590 | | −25.7% |
| 1930 | 766 | | 29.8% |
| 1940 | 940 | | 22.7% |
| 1950 | 715 | | −23.9% |
| 1960 | 855 | | 19.6% |
| 1970 | 1,640 | | 91.8% |
| 1980 | 3,051 | | 86.0% |
| 1990 | 2,807 | | −8.0% |
| 2000 | 4,294 | | 53.0% |
| 2010 | 6,019 | | 40.2% |
| 2020 | 7,413 | | 23.2% |
U.S. Decennial Census

=== 2020 census ===
As of the 2020 census, Tuttle had a population of 7,413. The median age was 41.7 years. 24.8% of residents were under the age of 18 and 17.5% of residents were 65 years of age or older. For every 100 females there were 99.9 males, and for every 100 females age 18 and over there were 94.7 males age 18 and over.

0% of residents lived in urban areas, while 100.0% lived in rural areas.

There were 2,743 households in Tuttle, of which 35.8% had children under the age of 18 living in them. Of all households, 66.5% were married-couple households, 12.0% were households with a male householder and no spouse or partner present, and 17.4% were households with a female householder and no spouse or partner present. About 18.0% of all households were made up of individuals and 9.8% had someone living alone who was 65 years of age or older.

There were 2,863 housing units, of which 4.2% were vacant. Among occupied housing units, 85.4% were owner-occupied and 14.6% were renter-occupied. The homeowner vacancy rate was 1.1% and the rental vacancy rate was 4.7%.

Racial composition as of the 2020 census
| Race | Percent |
|---|---|
| White | 81.6% |
| Black or African American | 0.5% |
| American Indian and Alaska Native | 5.3% |
| Asian | 0.4% |
| Native Hawaiian and Other Pacific Islander | 0.2% |
| Some other race | 1.7% |
| Two or more races | 10.3% |
| Hispanic or Latino (of any race) | 4.2% |

=== 2010 census ===
As of the census of 2010, there were 6,019 people, 2,178 households, and 1,272 families residing in the city. The population density was 206 inhabitants per square mile (80/km^{2}). There were 2,341 housing units at an average density of 56.5 per square mile (21.8/km^{2}). The racial makeup of the city was 88.6% White, 6.1% Native American, 0.4% Asian, 0.09% from other races, and 3.42% from two or more races. Hispanic or Latino of any race were 3.5% of the population. 0.3% of the population is African American.

There were 2,178 households, out of which 33.5% had children under the age of 18 living with them, 67.9% were married couples living together, 9.1% had a female householder with no husband present, and 19.7% were non-families. 16.3% of all households were made up of individuals, and 6.8% had someone living alone who was 65 years of age or older. The average household size was 2.61 and the average family size was 3.02.

In the city, the population was spread out, with 26.7% under the age of 18, 8.5% from 18 to 24, 27.7% from 25 to 44, 26.4% from 45 to 64, and 12.6% who were 65 years of age or older. The median age was 37 years. For every 100 females, there were 97.5 males. For every 100 females age 18 and over, there were 92.4 males.

The median income for a household in the city was $56,126, and the median income for a family was $48,682. Males had a median income of $35,599 versus $25,850 for females. The per capita income for the city was $26,707. About 4.5% of families and 9.8% of the population were below the poverty line, including 6.0% of those under age 18 and 10.2% of those age 65 or over.

== Economy ==
Tuttle is a largely agricultural community with a focus on wheat, cotton, corn, alfalfa hay, Bermuda grass hay, and cattle. Nearby Braum's Dairy, the largest farm in the area, is located just outside the city's limits and has a market presence spanning several states. The city serves as a minor bedroom community of Oklahoma City.

== Education ==
The vast majority of Tuttle is in the Tuttle Public Schools school district. The easternmost part of the municipality is in the Newcastle Public Schools school district.

The Tuttle Public Schools school district is divided into five buildings: Early Childhood Development (grades Pre-K and K) Tuttle Elementary (grades 1–3), Tuttle Intermediate School (grades 4–5), Tuttle Middle School (grades 6–8), and Tuttle High School (grades 9–12). Their colors are cardinal red and white, and their mascot is the Tiger.

Tuttle gained media attention on May 6, 2015 following a tornado that touched down near "Tiger Safari", a local safari park. Nicknamed "Tigernado", it quickly became a popular hashtag on the social media platform Twitter after reports were made that tigers had escaped the facility. The reports were later falsified by the owner after confirming the tiger enclosures were still secure.

== Notable people ==
- Clyde Conner – Former wide receiver with the National Football League's San Francisco 49ers
- Blake Jarwin – Tight end with the NFL's Dallas Cowboys
- Alfred P. Murrah – Chief Judge, United States Court of Appeals for the Tenth Circuit
- Chad Richison – Founder and CEO of Paycom Software, Inc.
- Jason White – Heisman Trophy-winning quarterback for the University of Oklahoma Sooners
