= In the Meantime, In Between Time =

Studio album by The Party
- Released: September 17, 1991 (U.S.)
- Recorded: 1990
- Genre: Pop; dance-pop; teen pop; bubblegum pop
- Label: Hollywood/Elektra
- Producer: Jellybean Benitez; Stephen Bray; Albert Fields; Julian Raymond; Andre Williams; Keith Williams

The Party chronology
The Party (1990)	In the Meantime, In Between Time (1991)	Free (1992)

Singles from In the Meantime, In Between Time
- 1. "In My Dreams" Released: 1991; 2. "Private Affair" Released: 1992

In The Meantime, In Between Time is a 1991 album released by pop group The Party, which album features covers and remixes and was intended to keep fans occupied until the group finished its next album, but it took on a life of its own. The cover of the Dokken song "In My Dreams" ended up being the band's biggest hit on the charts, peaking at #34 on the Billboard Hot 100 and #35 on the Billboard Hot Dance chart. The song would land the group an appearance on Club MTV, a return to MMC, another Disney Channel special titled Go Party! and another concert tour opening for Hi-Five.

== Track listing ==
1. "In My Dreams" (Don Dokken, George Lynch, Jeff Pilson) - 3:35 - Deedee
2. "Private Affair" (Diane Warren) 4:14 - Albert
3. "Sugar Is Sweet" (Remix) (Billy Steinberg, Tom Kelly) - 3:53 - Deedee & Albert
4. "I Gotcha" (Albert Fields, Chase Hampton, Damon Pampolina) - 4:05 - Albert & Chase
5. "Adult Decision" (Remix) (Allee Willis, Danny Sembello) - 4:16 - Deedee
6. "Peace, Love and Understanding" (Nick Lowe) - 4:12 - Chase & Albert
7. "I Know What Boys Like" (Christopher Butler, Merovigian) - 3:49 - Tiffini
8. "Spiders and Snakes" (Jim Stafford, David Bellamy) - 3:40 - Damon
9. "That's Why" (Power Mix) (Stephen Bray, Linda Mallah) - 4:16 - Albert
10. "My Generation" (Pete Townshend) - 3:20 - Damon
