= The Party (The Party album) =

Studio album by The Party
- Released: August 31, 1990 (United States)
- Recorded: 1990
- Genres: Pop; dance-pop; teen pop; bubblegum pop
- Label: Hollywood/Elektra Records
- Producers: Stephen Bray; Jellybean Benitez; Andre Cymone; Deborah Gibson; Matt Dike; Michael Ross

The Party chronology
The Party (1990)	In the Meantime, in Between Time (1991)

Singles from The Party
- 1. "Summer Vacation" Released: 1990; 2. "I Found Love" Released: 1990; 3. "That's Why" Released: March 27, 1991

The Party is the debut album by the band of the same name. It was the first full-length release on Hollywood Records, which was released in America in August 1990. The Party worked with the industry's top writers and producers at the time, such as Stephen Bray, Jellybean Benitez, Andre Cymone, and Deborah Gibson. The album was released in the UK in 1992, with a slightly different track listing.

The album produced two U.S. charting singles: "That's Why" reached #55 on the Billboard Hot 100 and #52 on Cash Box. Its follow-up, "Summer Vacation," reached #86 after having peaked a year earlier at #72 in the summer of 1990 as an advance single. Although "That's Why", "Summer Vacation" and "Peace, Love and Understanding" were released in the UK, none of them made it into the charts.

== Track listing (USA) ==
1. "That's Why" (Stephen Bray, Linda Mallah) - 4:43; Lead vocals – Albert
2. "Coulda, Shoulda, Woulda" (Michael Price, Terry Lupton, Mark Holden) - 4:02; Lead vocals – Deedee
3. "I Found Love" (Anne Preven) - 3:33; Lead vocals – Tiffini & Damon
4. "Walkin' in the Rain" (Barry Mann, Cynthia Weil, Phil Spector) - 3:52; Lead vocals – Deedee
5. "Sugar is Sweet" (Billy Steinberg, Tom Kelly) - 4:13; Lead vocals –Deedee & Albert
6. "I Wanna be Your Boyfriend" (T.V. Dunbar, J.W. Gangwer) - 3:45; Lead vocals – Chase
7. "Summer Vacation" (Albert Fields, Chase Hampton, Damon Pampolina, DJ Dino, MC Gizmo, Matt Dike, Michael Ross) 4:56; Lead vocals – Damon & Albert
8. "I'm Just Wishin'" (Sammy McKinney, Michael Monagan) - 3:44; Lead vocals – Tiffini
9. "Storm Me" (Wayne Hammer, Jeff Slater) - 3:48; Lead vocals – Albert
10. "Dancing in the City" (Billy Steinberg, Tom Kelly) - 4:48; Lead vocals – Tiffini
11. "Rodeo" (Julian Raymond, Chase Hampton) - 4:28; Lead vocals – Chase
12. "Ton of Bricks" (Deborah Gibson) - 3:53; Lead vocals – Damon

== Track listing (UK ) ==
1. "In My Dreams" (Don Dokken, George Lynch, Jeff Pilson, Mick Brown) - Lead vocals - Deedee
2. "That's Why" (Stephen Bray, Linda Mallah (rap by Albert Fields)) - Lead vocals – Albert
3. "Sugar Is Sweet" (Billy Steinberg, Tom Kelly) - Lead vocals – Deedee & Albert
4. "Storm Me" (Wayne Hammer, Jeff Slater) - Lead vocals – Albert
5. "I Found Love" (Anne Preven) - Lead vocals – Tiffini & Damon
6. "I Know What Boys Like" (Christopher Butler) - Lead vocals – Tiffini
7. "(What's So Funny 'Bout) Peace, Love, and Understanding" (Nick Lowe) - Lead vocals – Chase & Albert
8. "Coulda, Shoulda, Woulda" (Michael Price, Terry Lupton, Mark Holden) - Lead vocals – Deedee
9. "I Wanna Be Your Boyfriend" (T. V. Dunbar, J. W. Gangwer) - Lead vocals – Chase
10. "Walkin' in the Rain" (Barry Mann, Cynthia Weil, Phil Spector) - Lead vocals – Deedee
11. "Summer Vacation" (Albert Fields, Chase Hampton, Damon Pampolina, DJ Dino, MC Gizmo, Matt Dike, Michael Ross) - Lead vocals – Damon & Albert
12. "Private Affair" (Diane Warren, additional rap by Edward Bennett) - Lead vocals - Albert
13. "My Generation" (Pete Townshend, additional rap Damon Pampolina) - Lead vocals - Damon
