= Green Shoe Foundation =

Nonprofit organization

The Green Shoe Foundation is a mental health nonprofit organization based in Edmond, Oklahoma.

The foundation offers five-day retreats to help adults address past experiences, such as childhood traumas, and works to create better futures by allowing participants to live a life of peace and maturity, and by combatting social stigmas about mental health.

== History ==
The Green Shoe Foundation was founded in October 2015 by Chad Richison (founder and CEO of Paycom). Originally based in Oklahoma City, it offered its first retreat in the summer of 2016. Retreats are five days long, led by professional counselors and therapists, and are for adults 21-years-old and older.

In 2017, the foundation received the Dr. Murali Krishna Eliminating the Stigma Award.

In 2020, Green Shoe offered free telehealth therapy sessions to medical professionals and first responders experiencing emotional trauma during the COVID-19 pandemic.

Green Shoe moved into a new 10,000 square foot facility which sits on 415 acres of land in September 2023. In eight years, over 2,000 people across 42 different states and multiple continents have participated in the program.

== Process ==
Participants reserve their spot with a deposit. At the end of the retreat, the deposit is returned in full.

In part, the retreats use Pia Mellody's work in codependency, boundaries, and the effects of childhood relational trauma on emotional development. The retreat also uses the family systems theory to help participants recognize patterns and cycles of behavior. This theory, developed by psychiatrist Murray Bowen, states that behavioral patterns developed within relationship systems can either lead to balance or dysfunction, and recognizing these patterns and understanding their effect on current and past relationships can promote healing and healthy choices.
