= Riley L. Pitts =

US Army officer (1937–1967), awarded Medal of Honor

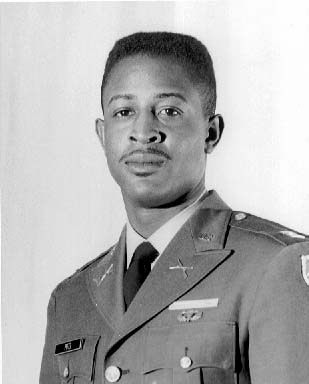
- Official portrait, c. 1966
- Born: Riley Leroy Pitts; October 15, 1937; Fallis, Oklahoma, U.S.
- Died: October 31, 1967 (aged 30); Ap Dong, Republic of Vietnam
- Burial place: Hillcrest Memory Gardens, Spencer, Oklahoma, U.S. 35°31′30.0″N 97°18′3.0″W
- Education: Wichita State University (BA)
- Spouse: Eula Mae Pitts
- Children: 2
- Military career
- Branch: United States Army
- Service years: 1960–1967
- Rank: Captain
- Commands: Company C, 2d Battalion, 27th Infantry, 25th Infantry Division
- Campaigns: Vietnam War; Counteroffensive Phase II; Counteroffensive Phase III †
- Awards: Medal of Honor; Silver Star; Purple Heart (2)

Riley Leroy Pitts (October 15, 1937 – October 31, 1967) was a United States Army captain and the first African-American officer to receive the Medal of Honor. The medal was presented posthumously by President Lyndon B. Johnson on December 10, 1968, for actions in Ap Dong, Republic of Vietnam.

== Early life and education ==
Riley Leroy Pitts was born in Fallis, Oklahoma. He attended Wichita State University and graduated in 1960 with a degree in journalism. He married Eula Mae Pitts and had a daughter, Stacie, and a son, Mark, while employed with Boeing. Mark became an active member of the organization "Sons and Daughters In Touch", where he has traveled to Vietnam to memorialize his father. Pitts is buried in Hillcrest Memory Gardens at Spencer, Oklahoma.

== Military career ==
After being commissioned as an officer in the United States Army, he was sent to Vietnam in December 1966. Pitts had seven years of service in the Army.

In Vietnam, Pitts served as an information officer until he was transferred to a combat unit. As a captain, he then served as commander of Company C, 2nd Battalion, 27th Infantry, 25th Infantry Division. On October 31, 1967, just one month before he was to be rotated back home, his unit was called upon to reinforce another company heavily engaged against a strong enemy force.

After his company landed in an airmobile assault near Ap Dong (11.434°N 106.532°E), Binh Duong Province, several Viet Cong opened fire with automatic weapons. Captain Pitts led an assault which overran the enemy positions and was then ordered to move north to reinforce another company engaged against a strong enemy force. As his company moved forward intense fire was received from three directions, including four bunkers, two of which were within 15 meters of his position. His rifle fire proving ineffective against the enemy due to the dense foliage, Pitts picked up an M79 grenade launcher and began pinpointing the targets. Seizing a grenade taken from a captured Viet Cong's web gear, he lobbed it at a bunker to his front but it hit the foliage and rebounded. Without hesitation, Pitts threw himself on top of the grenade which, fortunately, failed to explode. He then directed the repositioning of the company to permit friendly artillery to be fired. Upon completion of the fire mission, he again led his men toward the enemy positions, personally killing at least one more Viet Cong. Displaying complete disregard for his personal safety, he maintained continuous fire, pinpointing the enemy's fortified positions, while at the same time directing and urging his men forward, until he was mortally wounded.

== Awards and decorations ==

Combat Infantryman Badge
U.S. Army Parachutist Badge
	Medal of Honor	
Silver Star	Bronze Star Medal	Purple Heart (2 awards)
National Defense Service Medal	Vietnam Service Medal with three bronze campaign stars	Republic of Vietnam Campaign Medal

Republic of Vietnam Gallantry Cross Unit Citation

=== Medal of Honor citation ===
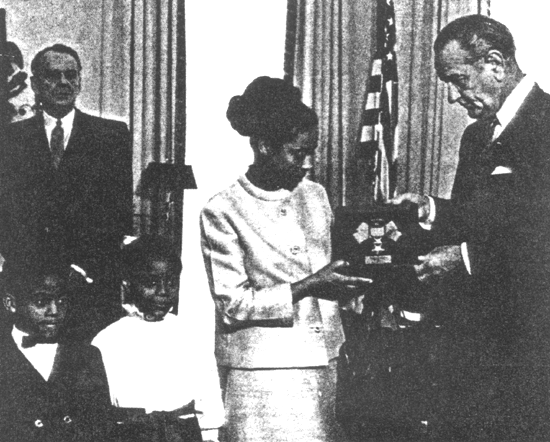
U.S. President Lyndon B. Johnson presents the Medal of Honor to Mrs. Riley L. Pitts on December 10, 1968.

Distinguishing himself by exceptional heroism while serving as company commander during an airmobile assault. Immediately after his company landed in the area, several Viet Cong opened fire with automatic weapons. Despite the enemy fire, Capt. Pitts forcefully led an assault which overran the enemy positions. Shortly thereafter, Capt. Pitts was ordered to move his unit to the north to reinforce another company heavily engaged against a strong enemy force. As Capt. Pitts' company moved forward to engage the enemy, intense fire was received from 3 directions, including fire from 4 enemy bunkers, 2 of which were within 15 meters of Capt. Pitts' position. The severity of the incoming fire prevented Capt. Pitts from maneuvering his company. His rifle fire proving ineffective against the enemy due to the dense jungle foliage, he picked up an M-79 grenade launcher and began pinpointing the targets. Seizing a Chinese Communist grenade which had been taken from a captured Viet Cong's web gear, Capt. Pitts lobbed the grenade at a bunker to his front, but it hit the dense jungle foliage and rebounded. Without hesitation, Capt. Pitts threw himself on top of the grenade which, fortunately, failed to explode. Capt. Pitts then directed the repositioning of the company to permit friendly artillery to be fired. Upon completion of the artillery fire mission, Capt. Pitts again led his men toward the enemy positions, personally killing at least 1 more Viet Cong. The jungle growth still prevented effective fire to be placed on the enemy bunkers. Capt. Pitts, displaying complete disregard for his life and personal safety, quickly moved to a position which permitted him to place effective fire on the enemy. He maintained a continuous fire, pinpointing the enemy's fortified positions, while at the same time directing and urging his men forward, until he was mortally wounded. Capt. Pitts' conspicuous gallantry, extraordinary heroism, and intrepidity at the cost of his life, above and beyond the call of duty, are in the highest traditions of the U.S. Army and reflect great credit upon himself, his unit, and the Armed Forces of his country.

=== Ceremony ===
President Lyndon B. Johnson presented the Medal of Honor to Mrs. Eula Pitts and his son and daughter on December 10, 1968. In presenting the award, Johnson declared,

What this man did in an hour of incredible courage will live in the story of America as long as America endures - as he will live in the hearts and memories of those who loved him. He was a brave man and a leader of men. No greater thing could be said of any man.

Captain Pitts' mother and father, Mr. and Mrs. Theodore H. Pitts, attended the presentation; also in attendance were Secretary of Defense Clark M. Clifford, Chairman of the Joint Chiefs of Staff General Earle Wheeler, and Secretary of the Army Stanley Rogers Resor.

== Honors ==
Pitts Hall at Lucius D. Clay Kaserne in Wiesbaden, Germany, is named for him. Pitts Park in Oklahoma City is also named for him. A mural depicting Pitts was unveiled November 11, 2023, at the park.

In 2025, Pitts' widow was watching a Muhammad Ali documentary when she saw a clip of her husband, stationed in Vietnam, being interviewed about Ali's opposition to the Vietnam War draft. Upon investigation, ABC News was able to find nearly 40 minutes of interview footage featuring Pitts, as well as interviews that were done with his soldiers after he was killed. Pitts' grown children had not previously had a recording of his voice and were touched by the rediscovered testimonials from his men.

== See also ==
- List of African American Medal of Honor recipients
- List of Medal of Honor recipients for the Vietnam War
- List of people from Oklahoma
