= Dwight E. Adams =

American forensic scientist

Dwight Adams
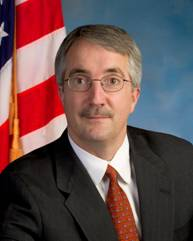
- Born: February 2, 1955 (age 71); Pecos, Texas
- Education: University of Central Oklahoma, Illinois State University, University of Oklahoma
- Awards: Presidential Rank Award of Distinguished Executive (2003)
- Scientific career
- Fields: Biology, Botany, Forensic Science
- Workplaces: Federal Bureau of Investigation, University of Central Oklahoma

Dwight E Adams (born 2 February 1955), is a forensic scientist.

== Education ==
Adams received a B.S. in biology from the University of Central Oklahoma in 1977. He went on to study biology and microbiology and received an M.S. in biology from Illinois State University in 1979 and a Ph.D. in botany from the University of Oklahoma in 1982.

== Career ==
Adams' first job was a 7-11 clerk after he got his Ph.D. Adams' career started with the Federal Bureau of Investigation began as a special agent in 1983 in Memphis, Tennessee. Adams joined the FBI Laboratory in Virginia in 1987. While at the laboratory, Adams headed the research team that "developed and validated the DNA testing procedures ultimately used in the FBI and throughout the world." Adams' research into reliability of DNA through validation enabled the FBI to be the first public crime laboratory to offer DNA testing for criminal casework. Adams was the first FBI agent to testify in cases in which DNA evidence was admitted in US courts. He would testify over 130 times at all levels of federal and state courts. In 1994 through 1996, Adams left the FBI Laboratory to go back into the field in the Newark, NJ field office. While there, Adams supervised the Interstate Theft Squad and Multiagency Interstate Task Force. Further, Adams was the Violent Crimes Program coordinator, leading two successful undercover operations. Adams returned to the FBI Laboratory in 1997, eventually being named as its acting director in 2001. FBI Director Robert S. Mueller III named him assistant director to the FBI and Director of the FBI Crime Lab on April 17, 2002, the largest and most complex laboratory of its kind in the world with an operational budget of more than $100 million. In 2003, Adams was the recipient of the Presidential Rank Award as Distinguished Executive; the highest award given within the U.S. government. Dr. Adams retired from the FBI after 23 years of service on June 30, 2006.

On July 1, 2006, Adams was named the first director of the University of Central Oklahoma Forensic Science Institute, returning to his old alma mater. While director, Adams has created a unique dual-degree forensic academic program and overseen the construction of a 30,000-square-foot (2,800 m^{2}) facility on the University of Central Oklahoma campus to house the Forensic Science Institute. Adams is also a scientific advisor to DNA Solutions, an Oklahoma DNA analysis company.
