= Chase Hampton =

American actor and singer (born 1975)

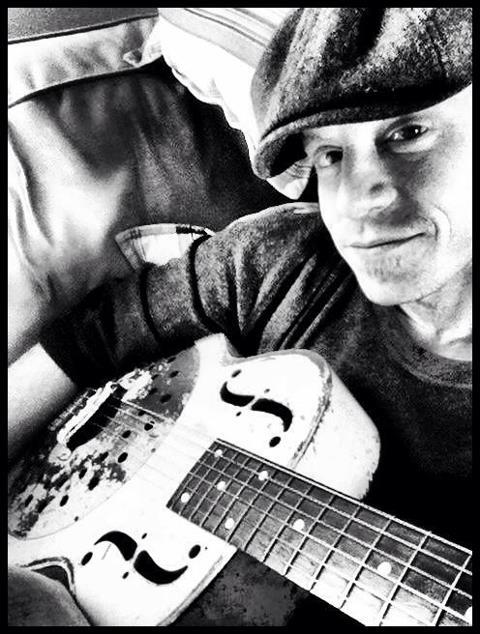
- Hampton in 2017
- Born: Chasen Cord Hampton; January 12, 1975 (age 51); Oklahoma City, Oklahoma, U.S.
- Occupations: Actor, performer, singer, songwriter, musician
- Years active: 1989–present
- Spouse: Lisa Cinelli (m. 2012)
- Children: 2
- Website: www.chasenlife.com

Chasen Cord Hampton (born January 12, 1975) is an American actor, performer, singer, songwriter, and musician.

== Early life and career ==
Hampton was born in Oklahoma City, Oklahoma, to Bill and Kenyan Hampton. He is of Cherokee and Sac and Fox descent. He has been singing since age 2, and by age 15 signed his first recording contract with Disney's Hollywood Records. Hampton has performed his music on stages all over the world, as well as appeared on MTV, VH1, E! channel's The E! True Hollywood Story, A&E's Biography, and starred on serial television shows such as Fox's The X-Files and HBO's Big Love, among others. As co-founder of the Buzzfly Records record label with producer Mike Vizcarra, Hampton has written and performed with a number of established musicians.

Hampton began his career as a student of the circus arts, working in childhood as a professional clown and later becoming a trained juggler and fire-spinner. In the mid-1980s, he made his acting debut in a guest appearance on the Oklahoma City-area version of Romper Room. Shortly after, Hampton won a small role as a mischievous little boy who called himself "Ben Dover" in the independent slasher film Offerings.

In 1988, Hampton and his parents answered the casting call for a Disney-produced TV movie, one that was to serve as a reunion of the original 1950s Mouseketeers from the Mickey Mouse Club. The project, titled Why? Because We Like You, was looking to cast a crop of new child Mouseketeers to join the elder ones in the film's plot. Hampton was chosen as one of the child Mouseketeers, but the project would soon go through many changes. Rather than producing the project as a TV movie, Disney decided instead to turn it into an actual revival of the original Mickey Mouse Club series for The Disney Channel, featuring an all-new child cast of Mouseketeers. With that, Hampton and several other children selected for the TV movie were retained to star on the forthcoming The All-New Mickey Mouse Club. He appeared on the show initially for four seasons between 1989 and 1992, before returning to the show as a co-host (with former castmate Tiffini Hale) for its final season in 1994–1995. However, Hampton remained contracted to The Walt Disney Company and to The All-New Mickey Mouse Club during the seasons he did not appear on the show.

Near the end of the second season in 1990, the producers of MMC sought to assemble a teen pop group in light of the current popularity of New Kids on the Block. Wanting to extricate such a group from the MMC cast, the producers chose Hampton, along with cast members Damon Pampolina, Albert Fields, Deedee Magno and Tiffini Hale, to compose the new pop act. A viewer voting contest would soon name the group The Party. Hampton went on to release four albums with The Party on Disney's Hollywood Records, charting five hit singles on the Billboard Hot 100 chart. The remake of the Dokken track "In My Dreams" was the highest-charting single, reaching #34, and is perhaps the best known hit from The Party.

Hampton has acted in several serial television shows and feature films and has been vocalist of rock bands Buzzfly and Close Enemies, as well as a solo artist.

Hampton's music has been produced by Dr. Dre, Snoop Dogg, and Teddy Riley. He has performed alongside film actors including Ryan Gosling, Keri Russell, James Van Der Beek, Shannyn Sossamon, David Duchovny, and Jessica Biel, and musicians including Justin Timberlake, Christina Aguilera, Britney Spears, Tony Lucca, Taylor Dayne, Color Me Badd, Davey Johnstone and Nigel Olsson of the Elton John Band, Tom Hamilton of Aerosmith, and Slash of Guns N' Roses and Velvet Revolver.

On May 16, 2007, Hampton independently released his first solo effort album, the eight-song Something to Believe EP, on his own Buzzfly Records label.

On August 20, 2010, Hampton independently released his second solo effort album, the four-song Drugstore Girls EP, on his own Buzzfly Records label. The cover model appearing on the EP is American model, actress, and former adult film star Kendra Jade Rossi. Hampton enlisted Orlando, Florida-based Serenade Entertainment Group (SEG) to secure a series of live shows and on-air in-studio radio appearances to promote & support the EP. Beginning in October 2010, SEG set Hampton upon a tour of the southeastern U.S., opening with an intimate club performance in downtown Orlando, where he offered an "up close & personal" extended set performing solo acoustic and as a trio, being joined by musicians Matt Adkins & Jay DiBella who later signed on as performing tour support.

Beginning 2011, Hampton served as co-creator and producer of the live concert performances of children's recording artist Riff Rockit, the alias & character of singer/songwriter Evan Michael. Hampton additionally served as a writer and voiceover artist on the 2013 direct-to-DVD release Riff Rockit: The Power of Music, in which he voiced the character of Ben Jammin. To provide additional voices for the project, Hampton hired a few of his former The All-New Mickey Mouse Club co-stars, including Damon Pampolina, Deedee Magno Hall, Marc Worden, and Rhona Bennett.

In 2014, Hampton teamed with Boston-area rap artists Reks and Dutch ReBelle for the recording of the hip-hop single "I Can't Breathe", which featured Hampton on vocals, Reks and ReBelle on rap verses, and production by American Antagon1st. "I Can't Breathe" addressed the then-recent cases of racial profiling by police, namely the infamous incidents that occurred in Ferguson, MO, and Staten Island, NY; it is the latter event that inspired the song's title, as victim Eric Garner was recorded to have spoken the phrase "I can't breathe" as he was apprehended by police. Accompanying the song's somewhat graphic music video, Hampton states on his website, "In light of the recent police violence and the need for our press to feed the fire. According to Hampton, the song was intended to "start conversation, promote understanding & healing, and awaken the blind. This is three artists' views on the feelings felt after so many have needlessly fallen." Released March 20, 2015, The single reached number 7 on the iTunes hip-hop/rap chart. on iTunes hip-hop/rap charts within a week of its debut.

On April 12, 2019, Hampton released a cover version of the P.M. Dawn song, "I'd Die Without You," performed with vocal collaboration from former bandmate Deedee Magno Hall.

On May 28, 2021, Hampton released the digital-single, "Nobody," executive-produced by Hampton himself.

In late-2023, Hampton was recommended to be the vocalist for the newly-formed powerhouse rock band Close Enemies, featuring bassist Tom Hamilton, guitarists Peter Stroud and Trace Foster, and drummer Tony Brock, bringing together a lineup of experienced musicians focused on original music. In January 2024, Hampton flew to Atlanta, GA, to audition for the band, putting his voice on the existing song demos, and was soon after asked to officially join the band. September 2024 found Hampton publicly introduced as fronting the supergroup. Media promotion for the band stated, "Close Enemies features dynamic vocalist Chasen Hampton, whose musical background contributes to the band's sound." On October 11, 2024, the band had their live performance debut in Nashville, TN, and on January 17, 2025, released their debut single, "Sound of a Train," and in early 2025 began touring. Another four music singles followed throughout 2025, with a full album debut intended for a late-2025 release.

== Personal life ==
On July 28, 2012, Hampton married Lisa Cinelli, a former girlfriend from his teenage years with whom he had recently reunited. The two originally met in 1989 on the set of The All-New Mickey Mouse Club when Cinelli was a visiting audience member. Their initial courtship lasted into Hampton's tenure as a member of The Party. The couple divide their time between Hampton's home in Los Angeles and Cinelli's residence just outside Boston, Massachusetts. They have two children, daughter Everly Love (born on October 20, 2016) and son Hayes Deacon (born March 12, 2018).

== Filmography ==
Film
Year	Film	Role	Notes
1989	Offerings	Ben Dover	
2001	They Crawl	Brian "Bean" Gage	Alternative title: Crawlers
2002	The Rules of Attraction	Townie	
Television
Year	Title	Role	Notes
1989-1991 and 1994-1995	The All-New Mickey Mouse Club	Himself	Seasons 1-4 and 7
1989	Win, Lose or Draw	Himself	Announcer
1997	Friends 'Til the End	Emcee #2	Television movie
1997	Buffy the Vampire Slayer	Elliot	1 episode
1998	USA High	Aaron	1 episode
1998	Malibu, CA	Ty	1 episode
1999	The X-Files	Donald Pankow - Hungry Guy	episode: "Hungry"
2000	18 Wheels of Justice	Waiter	1 episode
2000	7th Heaven	Clerk #2	1 episode
2001	Sabrina, the Teenage Witch	Birdbrain	1 episode

== Discography ==
=== with The Party ===
- The Party – Album (August 31, 1990)
- In the Meantime, In Between Time EP – Remix EP/Album (September 17, 1991)
- Free – Album (August 25, 1992)
- The Party's Over...Thanks for Coming – Outtakes Album (November 23, 1993)
- Greatest Hits – Compilation Album (August 19, 1997)
- "Salute to Summer" – Digital Single (July 19, 2013)
- "L.A." – Digital Single (June 19, 2014)
- "Give It" – Digital Single (2014)
- "Switch" – Digital Single (2016)
- "Don't Stop" – Digital Single (2020)
- "Party People" – Digital Single (2021)
- After Party – Album (Yet unreleased; date TBD)

=== with Buzzfly ===
- "Wicked Ocean" (feat. Tony Lucca & Mike Vizcarra) – Digital Single (February 1, 2012)
- "Believe" (feat. Nathan Worden & Mike Vizcarra) – Digital Single (March 1, 2012)

=== as Solo ===
- Something To Believe EP – EP/Album (May 16, 2007)
- Drugstore Girls EP – EP/Album (August 20, 2010)
- "I Can't Breathe" (feat. Reks, Dutch ReBelle & American Antagon1st) – Digital Single (March 20, 2015)
- "I'd Die Without You" (feat. Deedee Magno Hall) (P.M. Dawn cover) – Digital Single (April 12, 2019)
- "Nobody" – Digital Single (May 28, 2021)

=== with Close Enemies ===
- "Sound of a Train" – Digital-only Single (January 17, 2025)
- "Inside Out" – Digital-only Single (February 28, 2025)
- "Sweet Baby Jesus" – Digital-only Single (April 11, 2025)
- "Rain" – Digital-only Single (June 17, 2025)
- "More Than I Could Ever Need" – Digital-only Single (August 8, 2025)
- Close Enemies – Album (November 7, 2025: Digital; March 13, 2026: Physical)
