= Offerings (film) =

1989 film

- Directed by: Christopher Reynolds
- Written by: Christopher Reynolds
- Produced by: Christopher Reynolds
- Starring: Jay Michael Ferguson; Richard A. Buswell; Tobe Sexton; G. Michael Smith
- Cinematography: Reb Braddock
- Edited by: Christopher Reynolds
- Music by: Russell D. Allen
- Distributed by: Arista Films/Southgate Entertainment/Moonstone Pictures
- Release date: May 1989
- Running time: 95 minutes
- Country: United States
- Language: English

Offerings is a 1989 American slasher film written, produced and directed by Christopher Reynolds.

== Plot ==
John Radley's childhood was not a particularly nice one; his father's abandonment, an abusive mother, bullied by neighborhood kids and his pets had a tendency to die on him. Only his first crush Gretchen ever treated him with kindness.

However, this all ended when he was goaded into performing a balancing act, whereupon a malicious prank backfired and Johnny ended up plunging down a dried up well onto a rock floor. Since then, he has been in Oakhurst State mental hospital for over a decade. Left semi-comatose, he has only his now-distorted memories and nightmarish flashbacks for comfort.

One night, the continual flood of harsh images is too much for his psyche, and he comes to find himself badly disfigured and severely brain damaged to the point where he can no longer feel any pain. Who will care for, let alone love, Johnny now? No one, he knows (in what's left of his damaged mind). He suffers a complete psychotic breakdown, and after venting his fury on a nurse, turns his rage towards those responsible for his condition.

Bursting out of his temporary accommodation, he storms off into the night, dead set on disposing of his old childhood tormentors, whose body parts he intends to offer up to the only person in his life who ever gave a damn about him—a certain girl by the name of Gretchen.

== Cast ==
- Loretta Leigh Bowman as Gretchen
- Richard A. Buswell as John Radley
- G. Michael Smith as Sheriff Chism
- Jerry Brewer as Jim Paxton
- Elizabeth Greene as Kacy
- Tobe Sexton as David
- Jay Michael Ferguson (as Jay Ferguson) as Little David
- Max Burnett (as J. Max Burnett) as Tim
- Chase Hampton as Ben Dover
- Barry Brown as Deputy Buddy
- Heather Scott as Linda
- Patrick H. Berry as Greg
- Josh Coffman as Little John
- Kerri Bechthold as Little Gretchen
- Patrick Stratton as Little Tim
- Soren Myatt as Little Greg
- Barbie Yocum as Little Linda
- Amanda Tyner as Little Kacy

== Release ==
Offerings was distributed on home video by Unicorn/Prism in the United Kingdom in September 1989.

=== Reception ===
From contemporary reviews, "Lor." of Variety reviewed the film on the South Gate Entertainment video cassette on June 14, 1989. "Lor." declared the film to be a "pale imitation of the Halloween series of films, right down to the derivative musical theme" and that the film was "unpleasant rather than scary" and the "Film lacks the usual genre sex and makeup effects visuals."

Retrospective reviews commented that Offerings was considered a late addition to the 80s slasher film genre and received indifferent reviews.

== See also ==
- Exploitation film
- Horror-of-personality
- Splatter film
