= The Party (group) =

American pop singer

- Origin: Orlando, Florida, US
- Genres: Pop; Dance; R&B
- Years active: 1990–1993, 2013–present
- Labels: Hollywood; Elektra
- Members: Albert Fields; Chase Hampton; Deedee Magno Hall; Damon Pampolina
- Past members: Tiffini Hale (1990–1993)
- Website: The Party Ain't Over

The Party is an American pop band. The group was initially composed of Albert Fields, Tiffini Hale, Chase Hampton, Deedee Magno Hall, and Damon Pampolina, all of whom were cast members of The All New Mickey Mouse Club from 1989 to 1991. In 2013, the group reunited, without the involvement of Tiffini Hale.

== History ==
In 1990, the Disney Channel formed a pop band composed of then-current cast members of The Mickey Mouse Club. As part of the promotion for the band, a name-the-band contest was held. The result was "The Party," which is a backronym for "Positive Attitude Reflects Today's Youth." The group was also the first signing to the Walt Disney Company's pop-music-oriented label Hollywood Records, which, at the time, was distributed by Elektra Records.

=== Success ===
The band's self-titled debut album was released in August 1990 on Hollywood Records. The first single, "Summer Vacation," was moderately successful, peaking at #72 on the Billboard Hot 100. The following singles, "I Found Love" and "That's Why" (which brought the group into a much bigger audience, thanks in part to a remixed version and added rap vocals), peaked at #79 and #55, respectively. The album also charted at #116 on the Billboard 200 Album Chart. During this time, the Disney Channel produced a special titled "The Party: In Concert." The group's success landed it opening-act spots on major concert tours with the likes of Taylor Dayne and Vanilla Ice. The group also appeared on various shows, such as Live with Regis and Kathie Lee, Into the Night starring Rick Dees, and The Party Machine with Nia Peeples. In the summer of the following year, "Summer Vacation" was re-released in remixed form.

In 1991, the covers and remixes EP In the Meantime, in Between Time was released, which was supposed to have kept fans occupied until the group finished its next album, but the EP took on a life of its own. The cover of the Dokken song "In My Dreams" ended up being the band's biggest hit on the charts, peaking at #34 on the Billboard Hot 100 and #16 on R&R (Radio and Records Chart Top 100). The song would also score the group appearances on shows such as Club MTV, a return to MMC, a Disney Channel special titled "Go Party!" with special guest Robert Townsend and another concert tour — this time with the R&B band Hi-Five.

In 1992, with the release of the group's second studio album, Free, the band had shown growth with its changing sound and more adult-oriented lyrics. Teddy Riley wrote three songs for this album including the new jack swing-tinged title song, "Free," which was also remixed by the likes of house-music artists E-Smoove, Steve "Silk" Hurley, and Grammy Award-winning remixer Maurice Joshua. Dr. Dre produced the song "Let's Get Right Down to It," and the group itself also got involved in the writing and producing of the album, which would once again land it another concert tour—this time opening for Color Me Badd. Promotion included its last special for the Disney Channel, "All About the Party", and an appearance on the Blossom episode "The Best Laid Plans of Mice & Men" in which the group performed its song "All About Love." However, the album was not as successful on the charts as previous ones, which prompted Damon Pampolina to leave the group.

In 1993, the group disbanded, and Hollywood/Elektra Records released The Party's Over...Thanks for Coming with little advance notice. This farewell album consisted of outtakes from the Free recording sessions coupled with other songs recorded before the group's disbanding.

In 1997, Hollywood/PolyGram Records released a greatest-hits album of The Party; it had little chart success and was not promoted by the band itself.

=== Reunion ===
In 2013, the Party reunited without Tiffini Hale, and began working on a fourth album.

In July 2013, the Party released its first single and video in two decades, titled "Salute to Summer" release on the group's website.

In 2019 during the MMC's 30th anniversary, Hampton, Hall, and Pampolina performed I Want You, Summer Vacation, In My Life, (What's So Funny 'Bout) Peace, Love, and Understanding and In My Dreams.

In September 2021, Hampton, Fields, Pampolina, and Hall reunited as The Party for their first concert in almost three decades at the House of Blues in Orlando, Florida.

Tiffini Hale died on December 25, 2021, at the age of 46.

The Party performed for the first time since Hale's death at the 90s Con After Party on March 12, 2022, in Hartford, Connecticut.

The Party announced that they would be releasing a docu-film of their House of Blues concert on their official website and on the Always In The Club website for streaming beginning July 1, 2023.

The Party also set sail with fans on a VIP cruise from Tampa, Florida on September 15, 2023 after the 3rd 90s Con opening day.

On December 10, 2023, Fields, Hampton, and Hall performed at the "Why? Because It's Christmas" concert in Nashville, Tennessee, where they performed the song "I Wish You Peace" with other former Mouseketeers.

On September 16, 2024, during 90s Con, The Party was inducted into the New England Music Hall Of Fame

== Hiatus (1993–2013) ==
=== Albert Fields ===
Albert JeunePierre Fields (b. March 3, 1975) recorded a solo album under the moniker Jeune (which is half of his middle name), titled Back to Reality. Fields continues to perform and record on the indie circuit.

=== Chasen Hampton ===
In 1994, Chasen Cord Hampton (b. January 12, 1975) returned to host the final televised year of the 1989-era "Mickey Mouse Club" with his former MMC castmate and The Party member Tiffini Hale. After relocating residence from Orlando, Florida, to Los Angeles, California, his acting continued with roles in both television and film. He also continued to perform music, fronting the rock band Buzzfly along with musician Mike Vizcarra; incidentally, Vizcarra was one of the producers of the Party's 1993 farewell album. In May 2007, Hampton released Chase Hampton: Something to Believe and, in August 2010 came Drugstore Girls (under the name Chasen Hampton); both are solo effort EP albums on which he again worked in collaboration with Vizcarra. The latest album was released in late February 2011. In 2024, Hampton would join Aerosmith's bassist, Tom Hamilton' new side project band, "Close Enemies" and released their first single, "Sound of a Train"

=== Deedee Magno ===
Deedee Lynn Magno Hall (b. April 2, 1975) is married and has two sons. After the Party, she went on to perform in musical theater, most notably as Kim in Miss Saigon on Broadway. After playing the role of Nessarose in the first national tour of the hit musical Wicked, she went on to originate the role in the San Francisco company. Her husband, Cliffton Hall, also in the production, played the role of Fiyero. She also voiced the character Pearl in the Cartoon Network series Steven Universe.

=== Tiffini Hale ===
In 1994, Tiffini Talia Hale (July 30, 1975 – December 25, 2021) returned to host the final televised year of the 1989-era "Mickey Mouse Club", alongside former MMC cast member and The Party member Chasen Hampton. After the show ended, Hale remained out of the public eye and was diagnosed with schizophrenia in her early 20s. The Party announced on its official Facebook page that she died on December 25, 2021, after suffering from cardiac arrest and entering a coma from which she did not awaken. At the time of death, she was 46 years of age.

=== Damon Pampolina ===
Damon Philip Pampolina (b. April 6, 1975) dabbled in acting for a few years. He left show business for a while to work in real estate in Southern California. According to Pampolina on the recent E! True Hollywood Story chronicling MMC, he is also behind StreetNetwork TV, a Myspace-inspired Web site for artists waiting to be discovered. He also wants to get back into acting on a network show and has appeared in several commercials. In a February 2011 interview with OK! Magazine, he revealed that he had a 10-year-long relationship with former MMC cast member Brandy Brown-Pendleton, who was also a proposed member of the Party. He also reteamed with Fields to form the hip hop duo NDecent Proposal. He is currently living in Texas with his wife Jennifer and son Roman Valentino Pampolina and works for PRP Entertainment, where he is a host and is a co-owner with his father.

== Discography ==
=== Albums ===
Title	Chart positions
Title	U.S.
The Party: 1st studio album; Released: August 31, 1990	116
In the Meantime, In Between Time: EP/Remix album; Released: September 17, 1991	77
Free: 2nd studio album; Released: August 25, 1992	163
The Party's Over...Thanks for Coming: Outtakes/Unreleased material album; Released: November 23, 1993	-
Greatest Hits: Compilation album; Released: August 19, 1997	-
After Party: 3rd studio album; Released: TBD	-

=== Singles ===
Year	Single	Album	Peak positions	
Year	Single	Album	U.S.	US Dance
1990	"Summer Vacation"	The Party	72	21
1990	"I Found Love"	The Party	79	—
1991	"That's Why"	The Party	55	—
1991	"In My Dreams"	In The Meantime, In Between Time	34	35
1992	"Private Affair"	In The Meantime, In Between Time	—	—
1992	"Peace, Love And Understanding"	In The Meantime, In Between Time	—	—
1992	"Free"	Free	—	40
1993	"All About Love"	Free	—	—
2013	"Salute to Summer"	After Party	—	—
2014	"L.A."	After Party	—	—
2014	"Give It"	After Party	—	—
2016	"Switch"	After Party	—	—

=== Music videos ===
Year	Video	Director
1990	"Summer Vacation"	
1990	"I Found Love"	
1990	"That's Why"	
1990	"Sugar Is Sweet"	
1991	"In My Dreams"	Jumbo Pictures
1991	"Private Affair"	
1991	"Peace, Love And Understanding"	
1992	"Free"	Jumbo Pictures
1993	"All About Love"	
2013	"Salute to Summer"	

=== Tours ===
- Party 'til ya Drop Tour (1990)
- Taylor Dayne Can't Fight Fate Tour (1990) (Supporting Act)
- Vanilla Ice's To the Extreme World Tour (1991) (Supporting Act)
- Hi-Five Tour (1991) (Co-headliner)
- Color Me Badd Tour (1992) (Supporting Act)
- Mickey's Toontown Tour (1993)
