= Cleora Butler =

American chef and cookbook author

- Born: August 27, 1901
- Died: November 1985

Cleora Butler (1901–1985) was a chef, caterer and cookbook writer based in Tulsa, Oklahoma.

She is the author of the 1985 book Cleora's Kitchens: The Memoir of a Cook and Eight Decades of Great American Food, a memoir about her life as a house cook in Tulsa.

Gourmet magazine named Cleora's Kitchens the best cookbook of the year.

== Beginnings ==
In 1985, Cleora Butler published a memoir and cookbook entitled Cleora’s Kitchens: The Memoir of a Cook & Eight Decades of Great American Food. In her memoir, she describes her childhood experiences of visiting her grandparents during the summer to pick fresh fruits that her grandmother would turn into jams, jellies, and wines that she would enjoy tasting during the holidays. She also reflects on times when her grandfather would give her and her brothers sugar cane that he had grown to make molasses. At the age of ten, when left at home by herself, the mischievous Cleora prepared biscuits from a recipe pamphlet she had found. This was her first time attempting to cook. To her recollection, the biscuits were very tasty. It's memories like these that molded Cleora Butler's cooking career.
