= Tobe Sexton =

American actor and producer (born 1968)

- Born: September 6, 1968 (age 56); Fort Worth, Texas, United States
- Years active: 1985–present
- Spouse: Kelly Farrell (m. 2001)

Tobe Sexton (born September 6, 1968) is an American actor and producer.

Sexton was born in Fort Worth, Texas and raised in Oklahoma City, Oklahoma. He studied acting and directing for theatre as well as film at The California Institute of the Arts from which he earned a BFA. He appeared as a "Teen" Freddy Krueger in Freddy's Dead: The Final Nightmare.

In 1995 Sexton co-founded the Bauhaus Film Group. Around 2000 he moved underground to Indie film and created The TCS or The Technological City State, Productions. Affiliates include The International High IQ Society, Mandalay Entertainment, Apogee Magic, the Entertainment Technology Center-USC as well as several indie production companies and filmmakers.

Sexton produced the feature The Metrosexual.

== Filmography ==
Year	Title	Role	Notes
1989	Offerings	David	
1991	Freddy's Dead: The Final Nightmare	Teenage Freddy Krueger	
