= List of Northeastern State University alumni =

The list of Northeastern State University alumni includes notable alumni, faculty, and former students of the Northeastern State University.

== Athletics ==
- Billy Bock, late baseball coach for four high schools, won nine state titles
- Michael Bowie, offensive lineman for the Cleveland Browns of the NFL, Super Bowl XLVIII champion
- Jarrett Byers, former St. Louis Rams wide receiver
- Larry Coker, former head coach at the University of Miami
- Ryan Helsley, current MLB relief pitcher
- Bob Hudson, former NFL player
- Ronnie Jones, football coach
- Rosie Manning, former NFL player
- Derrick Moore, former NFL player

== Arts and entertainment ==
- Zig Jackson, photographer
- Dennis Letts, college professor and actor
- Jim Ross, former WWE play-by-play commentator; president of Talent Relations
- Shawntel Smith, Miss America 1996
- The Swon Brothers, The Voice season 4 third place; country music duo
- Carrie Underwood, American Idol winner; country music star; winner of multiple Grammy Awards; "country music's reigning queen"; performer of theme song of Sunday Night Football on NBC

== Business ==
- Bob Berry, co-founder and chief executive officer of Tri-B Nursery, Inc.
- Ken Selby, founder of Mazzio's Italian Eatery
- Jeff Storey, president and chief executive officer of Level 3 Communications

== Politics ==
- Bob Ballinger (B.A. in Social Studies Education), lawyer and Republican member of the Arkansas House of Representatives from District 97+ (Carroll, Madison, and Washington counties)
- Angela Barker-Jones (1969–2018), Cherokee Nation supreme court justice (2013–2018)
- Glenn Coffee, former Oklahoma secretary of state and president pro tempore of the Oklahoma Senate
- Agnes Cowen (1927–1999), Cherokee Nation tribal councilor
- Drew Edmondson, former attorney general of Oklahoma
- James E. Edmondson, current justice on the Oklahoma Supreme Court and former chief justice of the same court
- Janelle Fullbright (1945–2016), Cherokee Nation tribal councilor (2007–2015), deputy speaker (2013–2015)
- Sandy Garrett, former Oklahoma superintendent of Public Instruction
- Frankie Hargis (1965–2021), Cherokee Nation registrar (2018–2021), tribal councilor (2011–2018)
- Linda Hughes O'Leary (born 1950), Cherokee Nation tribal councilor (2003–2007)
- Ted Risenhoover, former U.S. representative from Oklahoma
- Audra Smoke-Conner (born 1968), Cherokee Nation tribal councilor (2003–2007)
- William G. Stigler, former U.S. representative from Oklahoma
- John Sullivan, former U.S. representative from Oklahoma's 1st congressional district
- Janees Taylor, Cherokee Nation treasurer (2021–present), tribal councilor (2013–2019)
- Kimberly Teehee, senior policy adviser for Native American affairs in the administration of President Barack Obama
- Phyllis Yargee, Cherokee Nation tribal councilor (2003–2007)

== Science and engineering ==
- Mary G. Ross, first Native American female engineer; one of the Skunk Works founding engineers
- Laura Sullivan-Beckers, biologist

== Others ==
- Bill Bright, founder of Campus Crusade for Christ
- Sara Dye, physician and surgeon
