= Clarence L. Tinker =

US Army Air Forces general

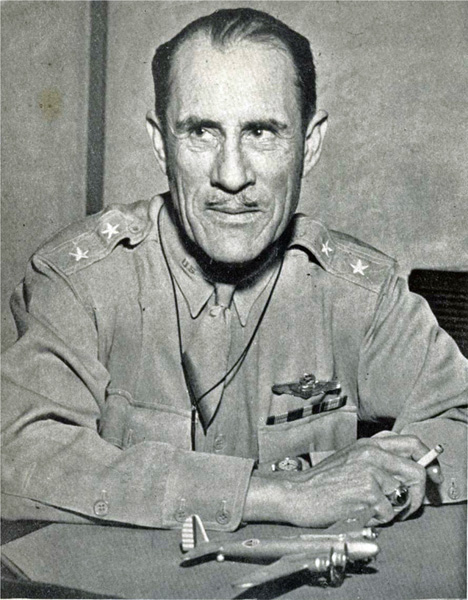
- Clarence L. Tinker as a Major General
- Born: November 21, 1887 near Pawhuska, Osage Nation
- Died: June 7, 1942 (aged 54); Near Midway Island, U.S.
- Burial place: Died at sea
- Military career
- Allegiance: United States
- Branch: United States Army Air Forces
- Service years: 1912–1942
- Rank: Major General
- Commands: 17th Pursuit Group; 7th Bombardment Group; 27th Bombardment Group; Seventh Air Force
- Conflicts: World War II; Battle of Midway †
- Awards: Soldier's Medal; Distinguished Service Medal

Major General Clarence Leonard Tinker (November 21, 1887 – June 7, 1942) was a career United States Army officer, the highest ranking Native American Army officer (as a member of the Osage Nation), and the first to reach that rank. During World War II, he had been assigned as Commander of the Seventh Air Force in Hawaii to reorganize the air defenses.

He flew to lead a force during the Battle of Midway in June 1942; his plane went out of control and was lost in the ocean. He was the first U.S. Army general officer to be killed during a battle in World War II, and the second general or flag officer, after Rear Admiral Isaac C. Kidd. Tinker Air Force Base in Oklahoma City, Oklahoma, is named in his honor.

== Early life ==
Clarence Tinker was born on November 21, 1887, near Pawhuska, Oklahoma, in the Osage Nation, the eldest son of George Edward Tinker and Sarah A. (Schwagerte) Tinker. He was raised as an Osage and learned the language and culture from his parents and extended family. His maternal grandmother was half-Osage; both her parents were mixed-race Osage who had Osage mothers, and fathers who were French traders from Canada.

Tinker received his elementary education in Catholic schools at Hominy and Pawhuska, Oklahoma, and at the Elgin, Kansas, public school. Tinker and his friends learned about and idolized the 19th-century Osage Indian scouts who served with the U.S. cavalry, and Arthur Bonnicastle, the Osage chief who, according to Dr. James Crowder in his book, Osage General: Maj. Gen. Clarence L. Tinker.", helped to suppress the "Boxer" rebellion in China.

While growing up, Clarence worked in the print shop of his father's newspaper, the Wah-Sha-She News. It was founded by his father and was one of Pawhuska's first weekly newspapers. Beginning in 1900, Tinker attended the Haskell Institute, the famous Indian school in Lawrence, Kansas, but withdrew before graduating.

In the fall of 1906, Tinker enrolled at Wentworth Military Academy in Lexington, Missouri. He graduated 19th out of 34 in the class of 1908, and was commissioned a third lieutenant in the Philippine Constabulary, serving until 1912.

== Army career ==
Tinker received his commission as a lieutenant in the U.S. Army infantry in March 1912. After infantry training, Tinker joined the 25th Infantry Regiment at Fort George Wright in Spokane, Washington. In 1913, his unit was transferred to Schofield Barracks, Hawaii. There he met and married Madeline Doyle, a native of Halifax, Nova Scotia. During World War I, Tinker served in the southwestern United States and California, and was promoted to major.

In 1919, Tinker began flying lessons. One of his assignments after the war was with the junior ROTC at Riverside High School in Riverside, California. When his father came to visit him at the school, they began a conversation in Osage in public; using his native language was one way that Tinker expressed his identity as Osage.

In 1922, he transferred to the Army Air Service. On July 1, 1922, he was assigned to flight duty. For a time, Tinker served as the air attaché to the U.S. embassy in London. He studied at the Army Command and Staff College in the same class as Dwight D. Eisenhower.

In 1927, he was named commandant of the Air Service Advanced Flying School at Kelly Field, San Antonio, Texas. Tinker commanded various pursuit and bomber units during the 1930s. He was steadily promoted, and on October 1, 1940, became a brigadier general.

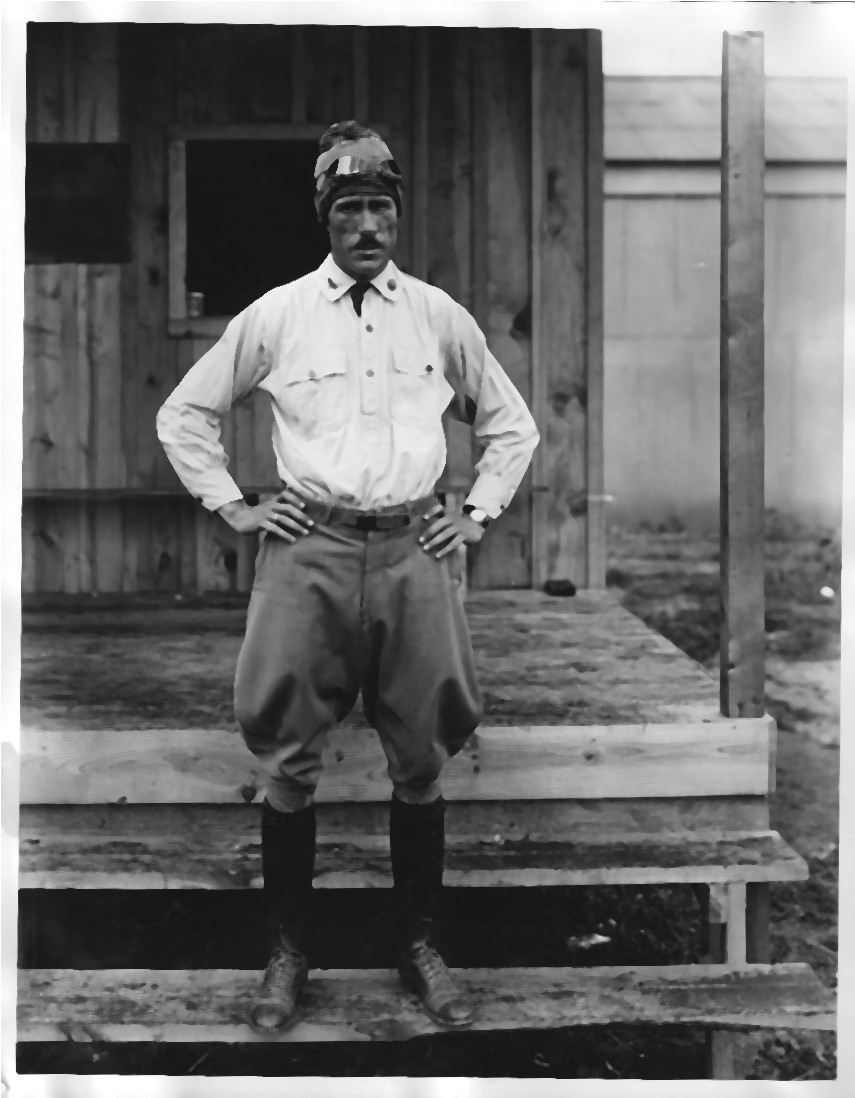
Clarence L. Tinker c. 1920

After the Japanese attack on Pearl Harbor, Tinker was named Commander of the Seventh Air Force in Hawaii to reorganize the air defenses of the islands. He believed that air forces were going to be critical to the entire war, and that Japan would eventually be defeated through a long-range strike effort by air. In January 1942, he was promoted to major general, the first Native American in U.S. Army history to attain that rank.

In June 1942, Japanese forces launched their assault of Midway Island. On June 7, during the closing stages of the Battle of Midway, Tinker decided to lead a force of LB-30s of the 31st Bombardment Squadron against the retreating Japanese naval forces. Near Midway Island, witnesses saw Tinker’s aircraft lose control and plunge into the sea. Tinker and all ten members of his crew were killed; neither the aircraft nor their remains were ever recovered. Tinker's son was also lost at sea while in a dogfight with German planes in 1944.

== Legacy ==
- Clarence L. Tinker was the first U.S. Army general officer to be killed in World War II. He received the Soldier's Medal in 1931 and was posthumously awarded the Distinguished Service Medal.
- On October 14, 1942, the Oklahoma City Air Depot was named Tinker Field in his honor. It is now known as Tinker Air Force Base.
- A bust of the general is outside the Air Force Sustainment Center headquarters at Tinker. Several paintings of him, and a display of his awards and medals are in the Tinker Club. His personal papers and original decorations were donated to the base by his widow, Madeline Tinker McCormick.
- A K-8 school is named after him at MacDill Air Force Base.
- The Osage honor Tinker and Osages annually at their 4-day In-lon-shka celebration, which honors men and women for different things. A tribute song was written especially for Tinker, and his surviving family members dance and sing to it. His is the only family song for which all the people stand.
- Tinker Drive in Mount Holly, New Jersey is named for him.
