= DNA Solutions =

DNA Testing Company

DNA Solutions is a DNA testing company created by biotechnologist Vern Muir B.Sc. in 1996, and incorporated in 1998. The company created a home paternity kit in 1997 and has since expanded its services to include DNA sample storage.

== History ==
DNA Solutions created the 'home paternity kit' in 1997, which was a new concept where people for the first time could take samples for DNA testing at home, instead of in the laboratory. Originally the kits worked by people taking a hair sample, and posting into the laboratory for testing. The kit was first reported in the Australian newspaper The Herald in 1998.

These home testing kits have since revolutionized DNA testing, and the industry has subsequently adopted DNA Solutions' terminology of using "home kit" and "home paternity kit" a term now used by virtually all DNA testing companies and laboratories for the "use at home" DNA testing services.

This new type of DNA testing led to a great deal of controversy, especially in the year 2000, when the Vice President of the Australian Medical Association issued a press releasing calling for a ban of DNA Solutions's services due to issues of privacy and consent. News of the new tests, and their availability online spread worldwide

Over the next decade while DNA testing kits were being adopted by most DNA laboratories, DNA Solutions spread its services to such countries as Russia, France and China.

In 2007, DNA Solutions profiled 800 elephant dung samples from the jungles of Cambodia in order to calculate the number of wild elephants remaining in the wild.

In 2008, DNA Solutions won the tender to store DNA samples for the Australian military and at the same time launched a service to store DNA samples for the public.

== DNA testing ==
=== Y-Chromosome DNA ===
DNA Solutions offers the analysis of Y-DNA for identifying the geographic and ethnic origin of paternal lineage. The use of Y-DNA testing is useful for discerning biological relationships between people with the same alleged paternal lineage (i.e. Uncle-nephew, or grandfather-grandson DNA testing).

=== Mitochondrial DNA ===
DNA Solutions offers the analysis of mitochondrial DNA (mtDNA); although it is inherited only maternally, mtDNA is found in both men and women. DNA Solutions sequences both the HVR1 and HVR2 regions for maternal ancestry and ethnic analysis. MtDNA testing is also used to prove biological relationships (i.e. cousins, granddaughter-grandmother, etc.)

=== Autosomal DNA ===
DNA Solutions offers the analysis of autosomal DNA STRs used for DNA profiling, paternity testing, and other biological relationship tests, such as sibling tests.
