= Freddy's Dead: The Final Nightmare =

1991 film by Rachel Talalay

- Theatrical release poster
- Directed by: Rachel Talalay
- Screenplay by: Michael De Luca
- Story by: Rachel Talalay
- Based on: Characters by Wes Craven
- Produced by: Robert Shaye; Aron Warner
- Starring: Robert Englund; Lisa Zane; Shon Greenblatt; Lezlie Deane; Yaphet Kotto
- Cinematography: Declan Quinn
- Edited by: Janice Hampton
- Music by: Brian May
- Distributed by: New Line Cinema
- Release date: September 13, 1991 (United States)
- Running time: 89 minutes
- Country: United States
- Language: English
- Budget: $9–11 million
- Box office: $34.9 million

Freddy's Dead: The Final Nightmare is a 1991 American 3D slasher film directed by Rachel Talalay (in her feature film directorial debut) from a screenplay by Michael De Luca. It is a standalone sequel to A Nightmare on Elm Street 5: The Dream Child (1989) and the sixth film in the A Nightmare on Elm Street franchise. The film follows Freddy Krueger as he manipulates a teenager with amnesia to escape Springwood and find new victims. This was New Line Cinema's first 3D film release.

The film stars Lisa Zane, Yaphet Kotto, Breckin Meyer, Shon Greenblatt, Ricky Dean Logan, Lezlie Deane, Tobe Sexton, and Robert Englund as Freddy Krueger. Additionally, several well-known actors make cameo appearances, including: Johnny Depp (whose screen debut was in the original film), Roseanne Barr, Tom Arnold, and Alice Cooper. Iggy Pop sings the title song, which plays during the end credits over a montage of scenes from the previous films in the series.

Freddy's Dead: The Final Nightmare was released on September 13, 1991. The film received negative reviews from critics and grossed $35 million in the US on a budget of $9–11 million, surpassing its predecessor's gross. While originally intended to be the final installment of the series, it was followed by the non-canonical Wes Craven's New Nightmare in 1994. A sequel, Freddy vs. Jason, which also served as a crossover with the Friday the 13th franchise, was released in 2003.

== Plot ==
Set "ten years from now," Freddy Krueger has returned and killed nearly every child and teenager in the town of Springwood, Ohio. The only surviving teenager, John Doe, is confronted by Freddy in a dream. John wakes up just outside the Springwood city limits but, due to a head injury, does not remember who he is or why he is there.

At a shelter for troubled youth, three of the residents—Spencer Lewis, an affluent stoner resisting his dad's attempts to get him to conform; Carlos Rodriguez, a troubled kid who was physically abused by his mother to the point of becoming deaf in one ear; and Tracy Swan, a tough girl who was sexually abused by her father—plan to run away to California. The police find John and take him to the shelter, where he becomes a patient of Dr. Maggie Burroughs. Maggie notices a newspaper clipping from Springwood in John's pocket. To attempt to cure John's amnesia, she plans a road trip to Springwood. In an attempt to run away, Tracy, Carlos, and Spencer stow away in the van but are discovered when John has a hallucination and almost wrecks the van just outside Springwood.

Tracy, Spencer, and Carlos attempt to leave Springwood but not before stopping to rest at the abandoned 1428 Elm Street house. John and Maggie visit the Springwood orphanage and discover that Freddy had a child. John believes he is that child because Freddy allowed him to live. Back on Elm Street, Carlos and Spencer fall asleep and are killed by Freddy. Tracy is almost killed but is awakened by Maggie. John, who went into the dream world with Tracy to try to help Spencer, is still asleep. Maggie and Tracy take John back to the shelter. On their way back, Krueger attacks John in his dream. Before killing John, Krueger reveals that his child is a girl; as John dies, he tells this to Maggie. Tracy and Maggie return to the shelter, but they find that no one remembers John, Spencer, or Carlos except for Doc, who has learned to control his dreams. Maggie finds her adoption papers and realizes that she is Freddy's daughter. Her birth name was Katherine Krueger, but her name was changed to Maggie Burroughs when her father was arrested and subsequently killed.

Doc discovers that Freddy's power comes from dream demons who continually revive him and that Freddy can be killed if he is pulled into the real world. Maggie decides that she will be the one to enter Freddy's mind and pull him into the real world. Before Maggie falls asleep to enter the dream world, Doc gives her a pair of 3D glasses, which she uses to enter Freddy's mind. In his mind, she learns that Freddy was teased as a child, was abused by his foster father, inflicted self-abuse as a teenager, and murdered his wife when she discovered his murderous tendencies. Freddy was given the power to become immortal by fiery demons. Maggie struggles to pull Freddy into the real world but eventually succeeds.

Maggie and Freddy end up in hand-to-hand combat against each other; she uses several weapons confiscated from patients at the shelter. Enraged by what she has learned, Maggie fights Freddy, pins him to a wall with a thrown knife, and tears off his clawed glove to stab him in the torso with it. She then finishes him off by thrusting a pipe bomb directly into his chest. The three dream demons, unable to revive him in the real world, fly out of Freddy after the pipe bomb kills him. With their departure, Freddy is finally and truly defeated. Tracy, Doc, and Maggie rejoice as the latter triumphantly declares, "Freddy’s dead."

== Cast ==
- Lisa Zane as Maggie Burroughs / Katherine Krueger
  - Cassandra Rachel Friel as Young Maggie Burroughs / Katherine Krueger
- Robert Englund as Freddy Krueger
  - Tobe Sexton as Teenage Freddy Krueger
  - Chase Schrimer as Young Freddy Krueger
- Lezlie Deane as Tracy Swan
- Shon Greenblatt as John Doe
- Breckin Meyer as Spencer Lewis
- Ricky Dean Logan as Carlos Rodriguez
- Yaphet Kotto as Doc
- Lindsey Fields as Loretta Krueger (credited as Lyndsey Fields)
- Johnny Depp as Teen on TV (credited as Oprah Noodlemantra)
- Tom Arnold as Childless Man (credited as Mr. Tom Arnold)
- Roseanne Barr as Childless Woman (credited as Mrs. Tom Arnold)
- Alice Cooper as Edward Underwood
- Elinor Donahue as Orphanage Woman
- Robert Shaye as Ticket Seller

== Production ==
=== Development ===
The previous five installments of the Elm Street franchise had considerably helped the finances of New Line Cinema that it earned the nickname "The House that Freddy Built" but the studio had also begun to develop other franchises (for example Critters and, by 1990, Teenage Mutant Ninja Turtles). Bob Shaye recalled in the Never Sleep Again documentary in 2010 that "frankly it was time to move on and we had other projects we wanted to focus on". The decision was made to make the sixth entry the final film in the Elm Street series. Director Rachel Talalay had produced most of the previous installments and was keen to helm the sixth film as its director; she also had a number of ideas that would help refresh the series including not calling the title Nightmare on Elm Street Part 6 and incorporating more humor into this entry which she felt was lacking from the previous film. The production of Freddy's Dead coincided with the original airing of Twin Peaks which was later acknowledged as an influence on the film with its more surreal humorous aspects. Elements of this can be seen throughout the film including Freddy using a version of the Nintendo Power Glove to control Spencer's character and dragging a bed of spikes to impale John Doe in a manner reminiscent of a Hanna-Barbera cartoon.

In the original script, 15-year-old Jacob Johnson (son of the previous installment's main character Alice Johnson) is the major character, and some of the dream warriors from A Nightmare on Elm Street 3: Dream Warriors return to aid Jacob in defeating Freddy after he kills Alice. This idea was later discarded - leaving Jacob's character renamed as John Doe with a smaller role overall - and actress Lisa Wilcox was allegedly never contacted about returning as Alice for the film.

Peter Jackson together with Danny Mulheron also wrote a screenplay called ‘A Nightmare on Elm Street: The Dream Lover’ that was not used; his story was about teenagers who did not see Freddy as a threat and took sleeping pills to enter Freddy's world to humiliate him; eventually he manages to kill one of them and regains enough of his strength to become a threat again. Jackson's script also included a police officer put into a comatose state leaving him permanently trapped in Freddy's realm. In the biography book on Jackson it is stated that The Dream Lover was set

"a few years on from Freddy’s last rampage, at a point when his powers appear to be losing their potency. A bunch of obnoxious local thugs meet up in Freddy’s derelict house, take drugs to put themselves into dope-induced sleep and–in a clever reversal of the usual Elm Street premise–enter Freddy’s dream world, track him down and beat him up in what Peter describes as ‘A Clockwork Orange-type mugging’."

Though Jackson's script was not used, it earned him 20,000 American dollars and more importantly introduced him to Robert Shaye, which was remembered and crucial later when looking for a backing film company for Jackson's imagined Lord of the Rings film series.

Another script for a sixth film was also submitted by Steven Lebowitz. In his script, Freddy returns very shortly after the events of The Dream Child and kills Jacob - still a baby - by bouncing him off the ceiling in a similar manner to how Tina Gray died; Alice ends up choosing to commit suicide rather than waiting for the inevitable of Freddy getting the enjoyment of killing her next. In this script, Freddy Krueger, while still alive, would have been a dream researcher himself and even helped Alice's father track down another killer who would have been one of the "100 maniacs" who raped Amanda Krueger. Another family would have moved into 1428 Elm Street, leading to more deaths. Also, rather than using the theatrical plot device of "dream demons", Freddy would have managed to enter a state of meditation or sleep even while being set on fire during his lynching, in order for his spirit to escape into the dream world upon his death.

John Carl Buechler was the chief special make-up effects artist for the film, returning to the series after serving the same role in A Nightmare on Elm Street 4: The Dream Master. He also contributed to the film's 3-D "Freddyvision" climax. The last ten minutes of the film are in 3D. To cue the audience to put on their 3D glasses, Maggie is seen to put on her 3D glasses in the film. The effect was eliminated for the VHS, Blu-ray, and television releases, with the exception of the British and French rental version and the US LaserDisc version. The DVD box set released in 1999 reinstated the 3D effect and included two pairs of 3D glasses, while the 2025 "7-Film Collection" released on Ultra HD Blu-ray reinstated the effect and included a single pair of 3D glasses. Rachel Talalay revealed that whilst the film was being processed in 3D, the lab developing the print accidentally sent them a two-second clip from the then-unreleased Terminator 2: Judgment Day.

An extended ending, in which the "dream demons" would seek out another boy with a troubled childhood to be a possible future replacement for Freddy Krueger, was featured in the shooting script but was either not filmed, or the recordings has been permanently lost. According to Michael De Luca,

"originally, we had this idea about the cyclical nature of child abuse; then we came to the opinion that this is an inappropriate forum to bring up that issue, much less comment on it, so we cut it out."

Talalay adds on the subject of the omitted ending that "there's a place to go with the concept but not necessarily with the character. Someone who can haunt your dreams is wonderful, but does that need to be Freddy?", while De Luca argues that such a series, with a central antagonist other than Freddy, would be a completely different series but calls Freddy's character and mythos "gone and over with".

=== Editing ===
Unlike its predecessor, there was relatively little editing of violent sequences as mandated by the MPAA. Rachel Talalay noted that the original cut of the film was long and, as a result, several sequences were either removed or significantly shortened (a total of around 47 minutes of footage was removed from the final print of the film).

The work-print for Freddy's Dead includes much of the deleted material. This includes Maggie discussing her nightmares with her mother, more dialogue between Doc and Tracy, additional footage of the Springwood Fair and the discovery of Freddy's basement lair. Rachel Talalay suggested that the reason the footage was removed was so the audience could "get to Freddy quicker". Some of the more disturbing elements of John's first nightmare were also trimmed down.

== Music ==
On September 3, 1991, Varèse Sarabande released an album of Brian May's score. Warner Bros. Records released the film soundtrack on September 24, 1991. Although not included on the soundtrack, the song "In-a-Gadda-Da-Vida" by Iron Butterfly is featured in the film.

Freddy's Dead: The Final Nightmare (Music from the Motion Picture)
No.	Title	Artist	Length
1.	"I'm Awake Now"	Goo Goo Dolls	3:34
2.	"Everything Remains the Same"	Junk Monkeys	2:43
3.	"You Know What I Mean"	Goo Goo Dolls	3:22
4.	"Remember the Night"	Johnny Law	4:15
5.	"Treat 'em Right"	Chubb Rock	4:44
6.	"Why Was I Born (Freddy's Dead)"	Iggy Pop	4:49
7.	"Hold Me Down"	Johnny Law	5:09
8.	"Two Days in February"	Goo Goo Dolls	3:17
9.	"Give Me a Beat"	Young Lords	4:32
10.	"Nothing Left to Say"	Fates Warning	7:58
Total length:			44:16

== Release ==
=== Marketing ===
As a publicity stunt for both Freddy's Dead and the comic storylines that were still being released around the film's cinematic release, New Line Cinema held a mock funeral for Freddy Krueger at Hollywood Forever Cemetery in Los Angeles, including attendants from the film series such as Alice Cooper, Lezlie Deane, Shon Greenblatt, Ricky Dean Logan, Breckin Meyer, Tobe Sexton, Lisa Zane, Lisa Wilcox and Whit Hertford. Andy Mangels and Rachel Talalay were among others present. On encouragement by New Line Cinema, the Los Angeles mayor at the time, Tom Bradley, declared September 13 to be "Freddy Krueger Day", but this move was heavily criticized for glorifying a mass murderer, with Robert Englund adding that "we have to separate crime reality from movie escapism". Barq's root beer participated in a tie-in campaign, attaching coupons to 3-D glasses distributed at theater screenings.

=== Home media ===
Freddy's Dead was released on June 4, 1992 by New Line Home Video through Columbia TriStar Home Video on VHS and Laserdisc. It would later be released on DVD on August 22, 2000 by New Line Home Video.

== Reception ==
=== Box office ===
Freddy's Dead: The Final Nightmare made $12.9 million in its opening weekend, which was the highest opening weekend of the series until the release of Freddy vs. Jason and the biggest September opening at the time, ranking number 1 at the box office. In its second weekend it made $6.6 million and remained in the top spot, before falling to number 4 in its third weekend. After its initial run, the film grossed $34.9 million in the United States and Canada, making it the fifth-highest-grossing film in the series. In the UK, the film spent one week at the top of the box office.

=== Critical response ===
The review aggregation website Rotten Tomatoes reported that out of 40 critic reviews, 23% of them were positive, with an average rating of 3.8/10. The site's critical consensus reads, "Reducing the once-terrifying Dream Reaper into a goofy caricature, this joyless climax will leave audiences hoping Freddy stays dead." It is the second lowest rated Elm Street movie on the website, ahead of only the 2010 remake. Metacritic assigned the film a weighted average score of 39 out of 100, based on 14 critics, indicating "generally unfavorable" reviews. Austin Chronicle wrote, "Freddy Krueger ... has devolved from the horrific, ill-defined phantasm posited in the original film, into a bland and annoyingly predictable bogeyman loved by kids everywhere."

The song "Why Was I Born? (Freddy's Dead)", written for the film by Iggy Pop and Whitey Kirst, was nominated for a Golden Raspberry Award for Worst Original Song at the 12th Golden Raspberry Awards. In the 2010 documentary Never Sleep Again, Lisa Zane commented that she had submitted a James Bond-esque ballad called "The Worst Is Over" for use over the end credits but "Why Was I Born" was chosen instead. Director Rachel Talalay had worked with Iggy Pop on the 1990 film Cry-Baby and offered him the chance to compose a song for the film.

== Other media ==
=== Comic books ===
Innovation Publishing published a three-issue comic adaptation of the film. An alternate version of the third issue was published in 3D to recreate the effect used in the film. The series was also published in trade paperback format. Innovation followed the adaptation with A Nightmare on Elm Street: The Beginning, which served as a direct sequel to Freddy's Dead: The Final Nightmare. In the sequel, Maggie Burroughs continues to have nightmares of her father, Freddy Krueger. Burroughs travels back to Springwood with Tracy, another survivor from the film, to research Freddy's life leading up to his death at the hands of the Springwood parents. Only the first two issues of the series were released before Innovation Publishing declared bankruptcy. The third issue went unpublished, and the story remains incomplete. Series writer Andy Mangels made the original script for the third issue available on his website.

The film was also spoofed by Cracked magazine in issue 15 of their horror-themed subprint "Cracked Monster Party".

== See also ==
- List of ghost films
- List of monster movies
