= Chad Richison =

American entrepreneur and philanthropist

- Born: Tuttle, Oklahoma
- Education: University of Central Oklahoma (B.A.)
- Occupations: Founder and CEO of Paycom
- Years active: 1998-present
- Awards: Ernst & Young Entrepreneur of the Year

Chad Richison is an American entrepreneur who has been Chief Executive Officer of Paycom since its founding.

== Early life and education ==
Richison, a graduate of Tuttle High School, holds a B.A. in Mass Communications from the University of Central Oklahoma (1989–93).

A native Oklahoman, Richison began his career in sales with ADP, a global payroll provider, before moving to Colorado to work for a smaller, regional payroll provider. In 1998, Richison and his family moved to Oklahoma and he founded Paycom.

== Paycom ==
Richison founded Paycom in 1998 and has since been Chief Executive Officer and a member of the Board of Directors. He was appointed Chairman in 2016 and was President from 1998 to 2026. Paycom is believed to be one of the first companies to process payroll completely online and has been recognized by Fortune, Forbes and Inc. Magazine for its continued growth as one of the fastest-growing companies in the U.S.

On April 21, 2014, Richison took Paycom public on the New York Stock Exchange with a successful initial public offering of 6,645,000 shares that generated net proceeds of $64.3 million. Following the IPO, Richison purchased an additional 52,600 shares of Paycom stock. In 2019, Richison said that the next important thing for the company is 100% employee engagement and usage with Paycom’s database. He sees employee self-service (ESS) technology as a necessary change, allowing employees more freedom to manage and input their own HR data, and freeing businesses to do more strategic, and less administrative, work.

In April 2021, it was reported Richison was the highest paid CEO of any American company in 2020, receiving US$211.3 million as part of a restricted stock award. If Paycom's stock doesn't meet specific targets by 2030, the compensation package for 2020 will be in the range of $20 million (Richison is not eligible for another stock incentive until 2026).

== Personal life ==
Richison lives with his family in Edmond, Oklahoma, and is a member of the Greater Oklahoma City Chamber of Commerce and Oklahoma Business Roundtable. As of September, Forbes estimated his net worth at U.S. $2.3 billion. Richison is one of only seven billionaires residing in Oklahoma and is the youngest Oklahoman on the list.

In November 2015, Richison made, at the time, the single-largest donation ever to his alma mater's athletic program. His $10 million gift to UCO Athletics will fund its athletic complex. In October 2017, he gave an additional $4 million gift to its 'complete the dream' campaign.

In 2015, Richison founded the Green Shoe Foundation, an organization devoted to helping functioning adults reconcile childhood traumas so they can live a life of peace and maturity. In addition to Green Shoe, Richison also created the Richison Family Foundation, which provides funding for organizations in children's education, foster care, food supplies and mental health. Their work includes support for Oklahoma's first Hope Lodge, the Oklahoma Educational Television Authority, the Oklahoma City National Memorial and Museum, public school programs, and more.

In December 2020, he announced he had joined The Giving Pledge.

In 2021, following a $10 million donation from Richison, the University of Central Oklahoma's football stadium was renamed the Chad Richison Stadium. To date, he has donated $25 million to the college.

In addition to his earlier philanthropic initiatives, Richison and his wife Charis have expanded their focus to community transformation within Oklahoma. Their gifts span the arts, education, mental health and social services. Among these is a $5 million donation to complete Oklahoma City’s American Cancer Society Hope Lodge, now bearing his name, providing free lodging to cancer patients and caregivers. During the COVID-19 pandemic they donated $1 million to support Oklahoma City Public Schools, and more recently they committed $17 million to the Green Shoe Foundation, and made multi-million dollar pledges to food banks, homeless services and school programs across the state.

== Awards and accolades ==
Richison was ranked one of the top 100 CEOs nationally in 2019 by Glassdoor, and was the only Oklahoma executive on the large business list. Richison’s placement ranked him above notable technology leaders like Apple’s Tim Cook.

In 2010, Richison received the Ernst & Young Entrepreneur of the Year Award for the Southwest Area North. Richison was bestowed the highest honor at the University of Central Oklahoma in 2012 after being named a Distinguished Alumnus. Richison earned The Oklahoman's 2013 Large Business Leadership Award, while his company ranked as one of the Top Workplaces in the state. Glassdoor ranked Richison among the highest rated CEOs for 2014. In 2015, Richison was named Oklahoma’s Most Admired CEO in the public company category and was profiled in Oklahoma’s Most Admired CEOs magazine.

The Green Shoe Foundation, an organization founded by Richison, was the recipient of the 2017 'Dr. Murali Krishna Eliminating the Stigma Award'.

From 2019 to 2021, Richison has been named to the Forbes 400. In April 2026, Richison ranked on Forbes' "Self-Made 250: The Greatest Living Self-Made Americans" list.
