= Paycom =

American information technology company

Paycom Software, Inc.
- Trade name: Paycom
- Type: Public
- Traded as: NYSE: PAYC; S&P 600 component
- ISIN: US70432V1026
- Industry: SaaS; HCM
- Founded: 1998; 28 years ago
- Founder: Chad Richison
- Headquarters: Oklahoma City, Oklahoma, U.S.
- Key people: Chad Richison (CEO); Shane Hadlock (CCO and President); Randy Peck (COO); Bob Foster (CFO)
- Services: Cloud-Based Payroll Software; SaaS; HCM
- Revenue: ▲US$2.05 billion (2025)
- Operating income: ▼US$567 million (2025)
- Net income: ▼US$453 million (2025)
- Total assets: ▲US$7.6 billion (2025)
- Total equity: ▲US$1.73 billion (2025)
- Number of employees: ▼5,800; (2025)
- Website: paycom.com
- Footnotes; Financials as of December 31, 2025.

Paycom Software, Inc., known simply as Paycom, is an online payroll and human resource software provider based in Oklahoma City, Oklahoma, with offices throughout the United States. It is attributed with being one of the first fully online payroll providers. Founded in 1998, it reported annual revenue of $2.052 billion for 2025, up from $1.883 billion for 2024.

== History ==
Paycom was founded in 1998 by Chad Richison, who previously worked in the payroll processing industry. It began as an online payroll service provider for businesses, and expanded to offer additional services including human resource management in 2001. On April 15, 2014, Paycom opened for trade on the New York Stock Exchange under the ticker symbol PAYC.

In 2011, it released additional services including E-Verify, onboarding, expense management, and document storage. In 2014, Paycom built a 90,000-square-foot addition to its headquarters—effectively doubling the size of its offices. The company completed construction on its third and fourth buildings (in 2016 and 2018, respectively). In 2024, it opened its fifth building, bringing the total square-footage of its corporate campus to 815,000. In May 2022, Paycom held a grand opening ceremony for a new 150,000 square-foot operations center in Grapevine, Texas.

CEO Chad Richison was the highest paid executive in the United States in 2020, earning $211.13 million from Paycom as part of a 10-year performance contract. The compensation consists mostly of stock shares that only vest if the company reaches specific stock price benchmarks by 2026 and 2030.

In 2021, Paycom announced the release of Beti, an enhancement to its payroll system allowing employees to complete their own payroll. Later that year, they bought the naming rights to the Paycom Center, home of the Oklahoma City Thunder.

In 2023, the company expanded its Global HCM offerings, providing access in more than 190 countries.

In December 2023, Paycom announced its next step in HR automation, GONE, a decisioning logic enhancement to existing Time-Off Request software.

In July 2025, Paycom launched IWant™, a command-driven AI engine allowing users to seek information about employee data without having to navigate through the software.
