= Albert Fields =

American actor and pop singer

- Birth name: Albert Jeunepierre Fields
- Also known as: Jeune
- Born: March 3, 1975 (age 50)
- Genres: Hip hop

Albert Jeunepierre Fields (born March 3, 1975) is an American actor and pop singer. He was a Mousketeer on The All New Mickey Mouse Club and a member of the pop group The Party. After the group disbanded, Albert went under the moniker Jeune (which is half of his middle name) and released a solo album in 1995 titled Back to Reality. The song "I'm da Man" was featured in the Wesley Snipes-Robert De Niro film The Fan. Jeune continues to record and perform on the indie circuit. Albert recently reunited with his old friend, former Mouseketeer and Party bandmate Damon Pampolina to form their own group, N'Decent Proposal.
