= Bohren =

Bohren or Bøhren is a surname. Notable people with the surname include:

- Craig Bohren (born 1940), American atmospheric scientist and physicist
- Geir Bøhren (born 1951), Norwegian musician and composer
- Peter Bohren (1822–1882), Swiss mountain guide
- Rudolf Bohren (1920–2010), Swiss Protestant (practical) theologian
- Sebastian Bohren (born 1987), Swiss violinist
- Spencer Bohren (1950–2019), American musician, teacher and artist

== See also ==
- Bohren & der Club of Gore, German band
- Bohnen (disambiguation)
- Boren (disambiguation)
