= Boren family =

American political family

- Current region: Oklahoma
- Origin: Texas
- Members: Lyle Boren; Mae Boren Axton; David L. Boren; Dan Boren; Janna Ryan; James Boren; Hoyt Axton
- Traditions: United Methodist Church

The Boren family is a prominent American political family from Oklahoma. The family has been described as "Democratic party royalty in Oklahoma" and "a mainstay of Oklahoma and national politics."

The family is one of the most notable in Oklahoma, producing Democratic politicians including Lyle Boren (1909–1992), U.S. Representative for Oklahoma's 4th district from 1937 to 1947, his son David Boren (1941-2025), Governor of Oklahoma from 1975 to 1979, U.S. Senator from 1979 to 1994, and President of the University of Oklahoma 1994 to 2018, his grandson Dan Boren (born 1973), a Blue Dog who was the U.S. representative for Oklahoma's 2nd district from 2005 to 2013, and his nephew Jim Boren who was political operative, humorist, and author.

Lyle Boren's sister was Mae Boren Axton, a notable composer who worked with Elvis Presley, Mel Tillis, Reba McEntire, Willie Nelson, Eddy Arnold, Tanya Tucker, Johnny Tillotson, and Blake Shelton and the mother of folk singer and actor Hoyt Axton. Janna Ryan, wife of the 2012 Republican vice-presidential nominee and former Speaker of the United States House of Representatives Paul Ryan, is niece by marriage of David Boren. In addition, Dan Boren's wife, Andrea, is the sister of the former quarterback of the University of Oklahoma, Josh Heupel, who won the national championship with the team in 2000.

== Members by generation ==
First Generation

- Lyle Boren, former member of the U.S. House of Representatives from Oklahoma's 4th congressional district (1909–1992)
- Mae Boren Axton, music promoter and educator (1914–1997)

Second Generation

- David Boren, son of Lyle Boren, 13th President of the University of Oklahoma, former U.S. Senator for Oklahoma, and 21st Governor of Oklahoma (1941–2025)
  - Janna Lou Little Boren, 18th First Lady of Oklahoma (1944–1998)
  - Molly Shi Boren, 19th First Lady of Oklahoma (born 1943)
- Hoyt Axton, son of Mae Boren Axton singer-songwriter, guitarist, and actor (1938–1999)
- James Boren, nephew of Lyle Boren, humorist, politician, and businessman (1925–2010)
- Cheryll Heinze, niece of Lyle Boren, elected to a single term in the Alaska House of Representatives in 2002 (1946–2012)

Third Generation

- Dan Boren, son of David Boren, former member of the U.S. House of Representatives from Oklahoma's 2nd congressional district, and former member of the Oklahoma House of Representatives (born 1973)
- Janna Ryan, cousin of Dan Boren
- Mary B. Boren, married to Nathan Boren (first cousin once removed of David Boren) and current Oklahoma State Senator

== See also ==
- List of United States political families
