= Boren (surname) =

Boren is a surname of German origin. Notable people with the surname include:

- Allen Boren (1934–2018), American college football coach
- Carson Boren (1824–1912), one of the founders of Seattle, Washington; first sheriff of King County, Washington
- Dan Boren (born 1973), American politician from Oklahoma; U.S. representative since 2005
- David Boren (1941–2025), American politician from Oklahoma; U.S. senator 1979–94
- Henry C. Boren (1921–2013), American historian and author
- James Boren (1925–2010), American humorist and writer
- Justin Boren (born 1988), American football offensive guard
- Lyle Boren (1909–1992), American politician from Oklahoma; U.S. representative 1937–47
- Mae Boren Axton (1914–1997), American composer
- Mike Boren (born c. 1962), American college football player at the University of Michigan
- Murray Boren (born 1950), composer of opera, symphonic, chamber, and vocal works
- Wen Boren (ca. 1502–75), Chinese landscape painter
- Zach Boren (born 1991), American football player
