= Joseph Harroz Jr. =

University president

15th President of the University of Oklahoma
- Incumbent
- Assumed office May 9, 2020
- Preceded by: James L. Gallogly

Personal details
- Born: 1967 (age 58–59)
- Spouses: Samia (m. 1999; div. 2018); Ashley
- Children: 3
- Education: University of Oklahoma (BA); Georgetown University (JD)

Joseph Harroz Jr. is an American lawyer and academic administrator. Harroz is the 15th and current president of the University of Oklahoma, and has served in that role since May 9, 2020. He previously served as the Dean of the University of Oklahoma College of Law and served as interim president after the resignation of James L. Gallogly from 2019 to 2020.

== Early life and education ==
Harroz grew up in Oklahoma City, Oklahoma, and attended Putnam City North High School. He graduated from the University of Oklahoma and Georgetown University Law Center. Harroz interned in Washington, D.C. with US Senator David Boren.

== University of Oklahoma ==
Harroz served as Executive Vice President to David Boren from 1995 to 1997. From 1996 to 2008, Harroz served as General Counsel to Boren at the University of Oklahoma. He became the Dean of the University of Oklahoma College of Law in 2010 under the recommendation of Boren, and served in that capacity until he was named interim president of the University of Oklahoma in 2019, before becoming the permanent president in 2020. While president of OU, the Sooners athletic programs moved from the Big 12 Conference to the Southeastern Conference.
