= Joseph Brandt =

Joseph Brandt may refer to:

- Joseph Brant (1743–1807), Mohawk military and political leader
- Joseph A. Brandt (1899–1985), president of the University of Oklahoma
- Józef Brandt (1841–1915), Polish painter
