= 2015 University of Oklahoma Sigma Alpha Epsilon racism incident =

The University of Oklahoma Sigma Alpha Epsilon racist incident, known as SAE-OU racist chant incident, occurred on March 7, 2015, when members of the University of Oklahoma (OU) chapter of Sigma Alpha Epsilon (SAE) were filmed performing a racist song that used the word "nigger" and referenced Jim Crow.

After a video of the incident was published, the SAE's OU chapter was closed and two of its members were expelled.

== Incident ==
On March 7, 2015, two videos were recorded of SAE members and their dates riding on a chartered bus to the Oklahoma City Golf & Country Club, where an event celebrating the national organization's Founder's Day was being held. In the video the students are heard singing a chant to the tune of the nursery rhyme "If You're Happy and You Know It". Below is how the chant was sung:

There will never be a nigger at SAE,

There will never be a nigger at SAE,

You can hang 'em from a tree,

But they'll never sign with me,

There will never be a nigger at SAE.

In addition to the use of the word "nigger", the chant also referenced two key elements of the Jim Crow era through the lines "You can hang 'em from a tree" and "but he'll/they'll never sign with me", which respectively allude to lynching and racial segregation, with the latter being in the form of denying admission for minorities, particularly African Americans, into the fraternity.

The video of the incident was reported on by The Oklahoma Daily on Sunday March 8, and also posted online by student group OU Unheard.

=== Beauton Gilbow video ===
An additional video emerged showing the fraternity's house mother, Beauton Gilbow, using the same word "nigger" while singing along to a rap song at the fraternity in 2013. Gilbow later stated that she was singing along at the time to rapper Trinidad James' song "All Gold Everything", which repeatedly uses the same word, and apologized for any offense.

== Aftermath ==
=== SAE chapter closure ===
On March 8, 2015, the national office of Sigma Alpha Epsilon disbanded the OU chapter and revoked the membership of its members, rendering them expelled from the national organization. Simultaneously, OU officials ordered the closure of the chapter house and gave SAE members until the end of March 10, 2015 to move out. Two days later, the fraternity's Greek letters were removed from the house and a padlock was placed on the facility's gate. Officials also blocked off the parking lot with barriers and caution tape and changed the locks.

At a March 18 press conference, the national SAE office apologized and vowed to promote diversity. The fraternity strongly denied that members had been taught the song, and stated they were investigating additional racist incidents. Elsewhere, the University of Texas said it was looking into claims the chant was used by SAE members there.

=== Students expelled ===
University of Oklahoma president David Boren ordered the expulsion of the two students who led the chant, Michael Levi Pettit and Parker Rice. Through two letters addressed to them, Boren justified their expulsions on the grounds that they "played a leadership role" in creating "an extremely hostile learning environment". The action taken by the university was based on school's Student Rights & Responsibilities Code. Rice and Pettit, both Dallas natives, enrolled in the Austin and Dallas branches of the University of Texas, respectively. In a later conference, Boren confirmed the two students would not return to the University and, at one point, offered to pay for their bus fares home.

The Los Angeles Times reported that Boren appeared to be alluding to Title VI of the Civil Rights Act, which bans racial discrimination at universities receiving federal money. However, the expulsions may have been a violation of the students' first amendment rights. First Amendment law specialist and UCLA Law professor Eugene Volokh asserted that President Boren's actions were unconstitutional. Oklahoma State University media law associate professor Joey Senat stated that the chant was offensive but is still protected free speech. Glenn Reynolds, a professor of law at the University of Tennessee, expressed the opinion that as a former U.S. senator, Boren should have known that the university was breaking the law in expelling the two students. A Washington Post article reported that a Sigma Chi fraternity successfully challenged similar action taken against them by George Mason University in 1992.

On March 13, alumni on the board of OU's SAE chapter hired civil rights attorney Stephen Jones to look into the legal issues involving the chapter's suspension and eviction of members from its fraternity house at OU campus. The national office of SAE stated that it was not involved in retaining Mr. Jones and was unaware of his intentions, and that board officials with the OU local chapter had stopped communicating with them since the chapter was closed on March 9.

On March 25, Levi Pettit apologized publicly for his actions. Parker Rice issued an apology earlier on March 10, 2015, and added that he led the chant under the influence of alcohol, while also stating that the chant was "taught to them". Protesters later gathered outside the Rice family home in Dallas and protested his apology as "not genuine".

In response to Rice's apology, an anonymous member of the chapter who was present in the chapter house on the day of the incident but absent from the bus during the chanting, confirmed in an interview that the students and members of the chapter seen in the video were drinking alcohol in the chapter house before the incident. OU president Boren suspected that the chant was learned on the fraternity's leadership cruise but the SAE national headquarters issued a statement that the chant is not one of their sanctioned songs and they would never allow such chant to be sung, stating that any member or chapter who adopts hostile chants are dealt with severe punishment. However, both the national headquarters and Boren state that the chant was informally shared during the leadership cruise by other members.

=== Reactions ===
Several SAE chapters across the United States such as those from, but not limited to Harvard, Yale, Connecticut, Dartmouth College, Oregon State University, and North Dakota, jointly condemned the incident and applauded OU and SAE National Headquarters for taking steps in disbanding the chapter.

The SAE-OU chapter's only two African-American alumni, medical sales businessman Jonathon Davis and lawyer William Bruce James II, defended the house mother, Beauton Gilbow, over her actions while also voicing their support for the chapter's closure. Davis has stated that his co-members in the chapter would have never allowed discriminatory behavior to take place while James echoed Davis' statements and stated that he disowns the people in the videos.

Meanwhile, a student from the rival Oklahoma State University, who also bears the name Parker Rice, became the subject of hate mail and death threats in a case of mistaken identity. Unlike the Parker Rice in the racist chant who was a Dallas native, the other Parker Rice was a native of Oklahoma and was an electronics engineering graduate of OSU who had returned to the same institution to study an Asian Studies course majoring in Japanese as a preparation for his move to Japan. He indicates his membership at the Oklahoma State University chapter of the Alpha Phi Omega service fraternity while condemning the racist chant incident. The Oklahoma-native Rice later posted on social media that he has no connection to SAE and that he was not the Parker Rice in the video.

In response to the video the Oklahoma Sooners college football team held arm-in-arm protest vigils instead of attending practice.

Several news media reports highlighted the fact that SAE, which was founded before the American Civil War in the South had a history of discriminatory incidents.

Robby Soave of the Reason Foundation wrote that the OU had failed to expel a freshman football player "caught on tape punching a female student in the face" in 2014. He concluded, "if anybody was going to be railroaded off campus without so much as a hearing, you would think it might be perpetrators of actual violence, rather than perpetrators of offensive speech (which is not actually a category of crime)."

Mika Brzezinski and Joe Scarborough of Morning Joe television show blamed the fraternity brothers' use of the word on hip hop music.

Actor and Delta Tau Delta alum Will Ferrell said the incident might be an argument to end the entire college fraternity system. "The incident in Oklahoma, that is a real argument for getting rid of the system altogether, in my opinion, even having been through a fraternity," he told The New York Times.

On March 23, United States President Barack Obama responded to the incident during an interview with the Huffington Post. Obama said it was "not the first time that somebody at a fraternity has done something stupid, racist, sexist," and that it was likely not the last. He commended University of Oklahoma President David Boren for his swift action, and the OU community's response to the video.

=== Mandatory diversity programs ===
Beginning in 2015, first-year students and faculty have been required to take a five-hour course on diversity. Although several news outlets have connected the training to the chanting video, the course was announced in January, prior to the incident, in connection with a rumors of a "Cowboy and Indians" theme party being planned by a different fraternity.

In a similar manner, the SAE national headquarters have also launched mandatory diversity courses for its pledges.

=== Chapter house repurposed ===
On March 10, 2015, OU regained priority over the property. The former chapter house was leased to SAE by OU and was not SAE property. Instead, the chapter house had always been under the ownership of the university.

The outer wall of the building was vandalized with black spray paint on the day of the incident, and was promptly removed by the university.

At the beginning of the 2016 academic semester, the former SAE chapter house became the location for OU's University Community Center, which houses the Disability Resource Center (DRC) and the Student Veterans' Association. The seizure of the fraternity house became an opportunity for the DRC to expand, since the center was previously a small wing at Goddard Health Center and had been searching for a location to expand to.

Within the Student Veterans' Association's lounge, there is a small exhibit a part of the Henderson Scholars Program in the lower lobby of the former chapter house, to notable university alumni such as Ada Lois Sipuel Fisher who performed a significant role in the civil rights movement in Oklahoma.
