= George Lynn Cross =

American botanist and university president (1905–1998)

George Lynn Cross Ph.D.
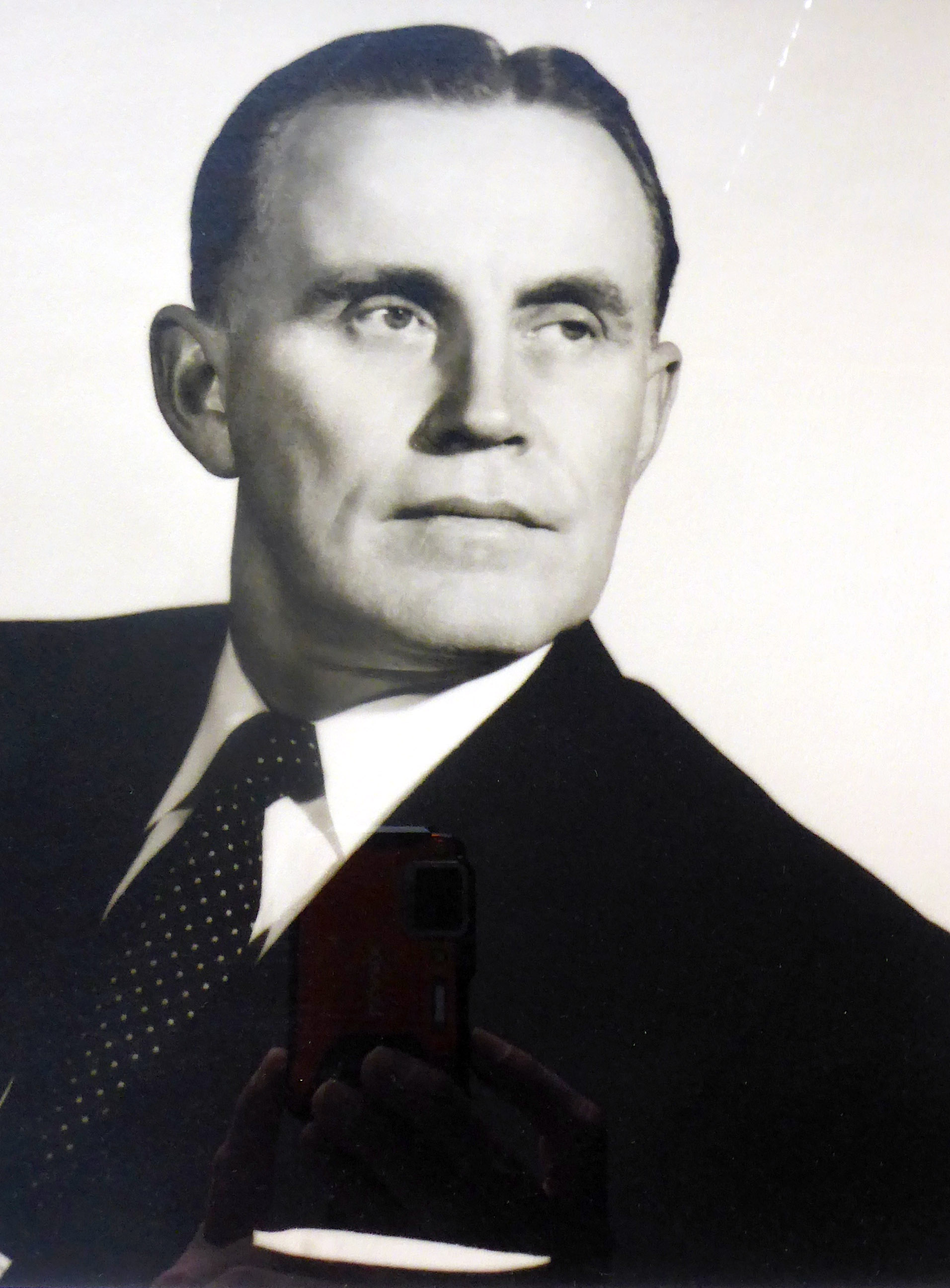
- George Lynn Cross

7th President of the University of Oklahoma
- In office 1944–1968
- Preceded by: Joseph A. Brandt
- Succeeded by: John Herbert Hollomon Jr.

Personal details
- Born: May 12, 1905 Woonsocket, South Dakota, U.S.
- Died: December 31, 1998 (aged 93) Norman, Oklahoma
- Spouse: Cleo S. Cross
- Education: South Dakota State University (B.S., M.S.); University of Chicago, Ph.D.
- Profession: Botanist, University President

George Lynn Cross (May 12, 1905 – December 31, 1998) was a botanist, writer, and the longest serving president of the University of Oklahoma (1943 to 1968). After he was appointed president at the age of 38, Cross helped peacefully integrate the university; built and oversaw the most winning college football program of the 1950s; spearheaded the expansion of numerous academic programs and facilities; and then helped lead the university through the 1960s protest period. After retiring as president, Cross wrote several books, the first of which, Blacks in White Colleges, described his personal experiences during the constitutional desegregation litigation that arose almost immediately after he became the university's young president.

== Early life ==
Cross was born into a poor family in Woonsocket, South Dakota. Some of his half siblings had been affected by Huntington's Corea, which brought disrepute to his family in the small community. Due to these circumstances, attending college seemed unfeasible to Cross. Instead, he aspired to become a high school science teacher. However, his talent in athletics, particularly football, caught the attention of the football program at South Dakota State College. They helped him secure a dishwashing job in the women's dormitory, which enabled him to finance his education there. During his first day at school, Cross met Cleo Sikkink from Waubay, South Dakota, and the two embarked on a romance. Despite opposition from Cleo's family, who disapproved of Cross due to his poor prospects and family background, the couple eloped a few months later. Realizing the toll football was taking on his body and its limited future, Cross decided to shift his focus to academics as a prospective career. He pursued the study of botany and earned a master's degree in 1927. Subsequently, he pursued a Ph.D. in botany at the University of Chicago, which he completed at the age of 23.

== Teacher and naturalist ==
Cross began his teaching career in South Dakota in the early 1930s. In the summer of 1934 at a biological station in Gothic, Colorado, Cross met and befriended one of the deans of ecology and conservation biology, Paul B. Sears, who was at that time teaching at the University of Oklahoma. Sears offered Cross a job and Cross, his wife Cleo and daughter Mary-Lynn moved to Norman, Oklahoma in 1934. Cross was offered a job as an associate professor. Before his death, Cross remarked that he largely took over Sears' teaching responsibilities, so that Sears could finish his watershed work, Deserts on the March, which is considered a classic of conservation biology.

Cross's academic specialty was botany, and George Lynn Cross Hall, which houses OU's department of botany and microbiology, was named in his honor and in tribute to this fact. While president, Cross prepared specimen slides that are still used in botany classes.

== Presidency ==
Cross's popularity quickly grew amongst the faculty and staff, and when the university president at the time stepped down, he was named interim president while the board of regents searched for a new candidate. They eventually realized no better candidate existed and he remained president for 24 years.

Cross oversaw the college through a period of skyrocketing enrollment following World War II as thousands of veterans attended under the G.I. Bill. He saw the construction of 37 new buildings and the donation by the U.S. Navy, in May 1946, of 1,400 acres (5.7 km^{2}) to the campus. Cross also oversaw the integration of the University of Oklahoma and the student protests of the 1960s.

Seven years into his presidency, deciding on the George W. McLaurin v. Oklahoma State Regents appeal, the Supreme Court rejected the "Separate and Equal" policy imposed on African American students in University of Oklahoma. To balance between the university's position about Black students and the new rule, Cross improvised a solution by ordering the student to sit in a corner of the classroom where he could see and hear lectures but physically separated from the rest of the class.

Cross was known for his public speaking ability and quick wit. His most famous quote came at a budget meeting with state legislators. After a long presentation and 45 minute justification of the OU budget, a legislator asked him why the university needed more money. A frustrated Cross replied, "I would like to build a University of which the football team could be proud."

David L. Boren, who served as the university's president from 1994 to 2018, proclaimed that he wanted his time as president of the university to parallel that of Cross's.

Preceded by Joseph A. Brandt	President of the University of Oklahoma; 1943-1968	Succeeded by John Herbert Hollomon, Jr.
