= Boren =

Boren may refer to:

== People ==
- Boren (surname)
- Bo people (China), the Boren of southwest China

== Places ==
- Lake Boren, a lake in Newcastle, Washington
- Boren (Sweden), a lake in Sweden
- Boren, Germany, a municipality in Germany
- Bořeň, a phonolite hill in the Czech Republic
- Louisa Boren Park, in Seattle, Washington

== Other uses ==
- Boren–McCurdy proposals, American intelligence reform proposals
- Borens IK, Swedish football club
