= William Bizzell =

American university president (1876–1944)

William Bizzell Ph.D.
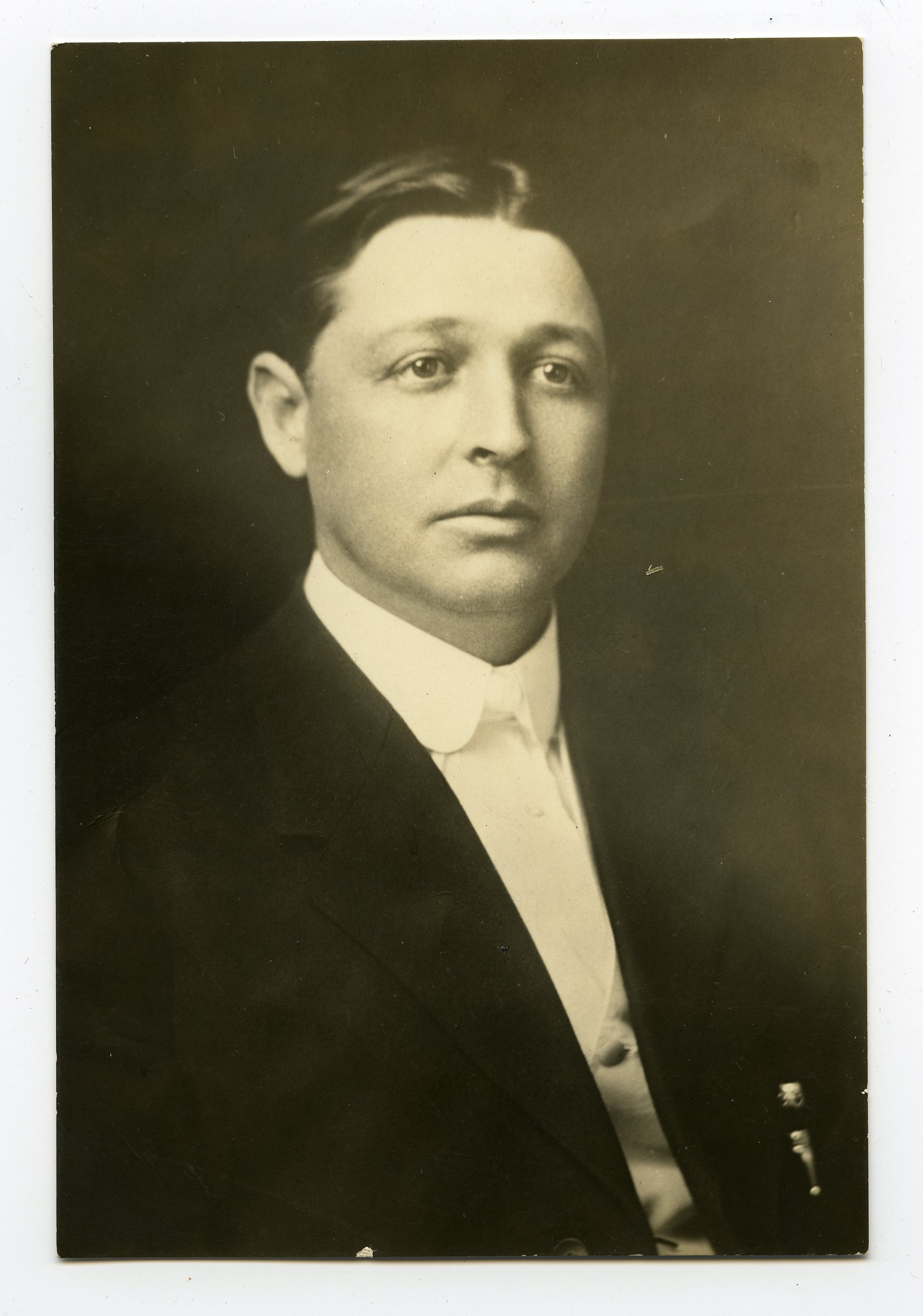

5th President of the University of Oklahoma
- In office 1925–1941
- Preceded by: James S. Buchanan
- Succeeded by: Joseph A. Brandt

President of the Agricultural and Mechanical College of Texas
- In office 1914–1925
- Preceded by: Robert Teague Milner
- Succeeded by: Thomas Otto Walton

President of College of Industrial Arts
- In office 1910–1914

Personal details
- Born: October 14, 1876 Independence, Texas, U.S.
- Died: May 13, 1944 (aged 67) Norman, Oklahoma, U.S.
- Education: Baylor University; University of Illinois College of Law; Columbia University

William Bennett Bizzell (October 14, 1876 – May 13, 1944) was the president of three American higher education institutions. He was the fifth president of the University of Oklahoma, the president of Agricultural and Mechanical College of Texas (now Texas A&M University), and the president of the College of Industrial Arts (now Texas Woman's University).

== Early life and career ==
Bizzell was born in Independence, Texas, to George McDuffie and Sarah Elizabeth (Wade) Bizzell. He received multiple degrees from Baylor University between 1898 and 1900 and from the University of Illinois College of Law between 1911 and 1912. He received his Ph.D. from Columbia University in 1921. From 1900 to 1910, he served as the superintendent of schools for Navasota, Texas. From 1910 to 1914, he was president of the College of Industrial Arts in Denton, Texas and from 1914 to 1925, he was president of the Agricultural and Mechanical College of Texas in College Station, Texas.

== University of Oklahoma ==
In 1926, he headed to Norman, Oklahoma to become president of the University of Oklahoma effective July 1 of that year. He made many changes during his 15 years as president. In his first five years, he organized the utilities department at the university (previously, workmen reported directed to the university president for even the most trivial matters); oversaw vast improvements to the university's library system (for which the main library in the heart of the campus bears his name); presided over the building of Oklahoma Memorial Stadium and the McCasland Field House along with athletic director Bennie Owen; oversaw the new liberal arts building; approved the creation of the School of Religion; reorganized the School of Journalism; helped get funding for the creation of the University Medical Center in Oklahoma City, Oklahoma; established the University Press; increased the salary of the faculty; converted the School of Business from a two-year program to a four-year program and renamed it the College of Business Administration; and saw the building of the new Oklahoma Memorial Union. By 1934, the university was the tenth largest state institution in the nation and 24th largest institution of higher learning in the nation. The latter part of his presidency saw the construction of the new business administration building, the new biological sciences building, and the creation of the new University of Oklahoma Foundation. Bizzell was also a powerful orator. He was elected president of the National Association of State Universities; he received the Medal of Excellence from Columbia University; and he was selected from all college presidents as the one to write the article on higher education for the Encyclopedia Americana.

== Retirement and death ==
In the spring of 1940, he announced his resignation to be effective the next year. The Board of Regents invited him to remain on the staff as president emeritus and head of the sociology department. Just three years after he resigned as president of the university, Bizzell died in Norman on May 13, 1944.

== Notes ==
Preceded by Charles Puryear	President of the Agricultural and Mechanical College of Texas; 1914–1925	Succeeded by Thomas Otto Walton
Preceded by James S. Buchanan	President of the University of Oklahoma; 1926–1941	Succeeded by Joseph A. Brandt
