= Joseph A. Brandt =

University president, journalist and editor

6th President of the University of Oklahoma
- In office 1941–1943
- Preceded by: William Bizzell
- Succeeded by: George Lynn Cross

Personal details
- Born: July 26, 1899
- Died: November 1, 1985 (aged 86)
- Education: University of Oklahoma; Oxford University

Joseph A. Brandt (July 26, 1899 – November 1, 1985) was the sixth president of the University of Oklahoma.

Brandt received his college degree from the University of Oklahoma, making him the first alumnus to become president of the University of Oklahoma. Following his degree at Oklahoma, he went to the University of Oxford as a Rhodes Scholar and received three degrees there. He returned to Oklahoma to become the city editor of the Tulsa Tribune. In 1928, he took a job as head of the University of Oklahoma Press where he remained until 1938 when he accepted a similar position at the Princeton University Press. In 1941, after turning down three previous offers for better paying positions, he returned to Oklahoma as the president of the University, a position he held for only two years. He left in 1943 after the Oklahoma state government cut the University's already low budget further. He accepted a position as head of the University of Chicago Press, which was the largest press of its kind when he took over.

Preceded by William Bennett Bizzell	President of the University of Oklahoma; 1941–1943	Succeeded by George Lynn Cross
