= Strother Memorial Chapel =

Chapel in Seminole, Oklahoma

- U.S. National Register of Historic Places
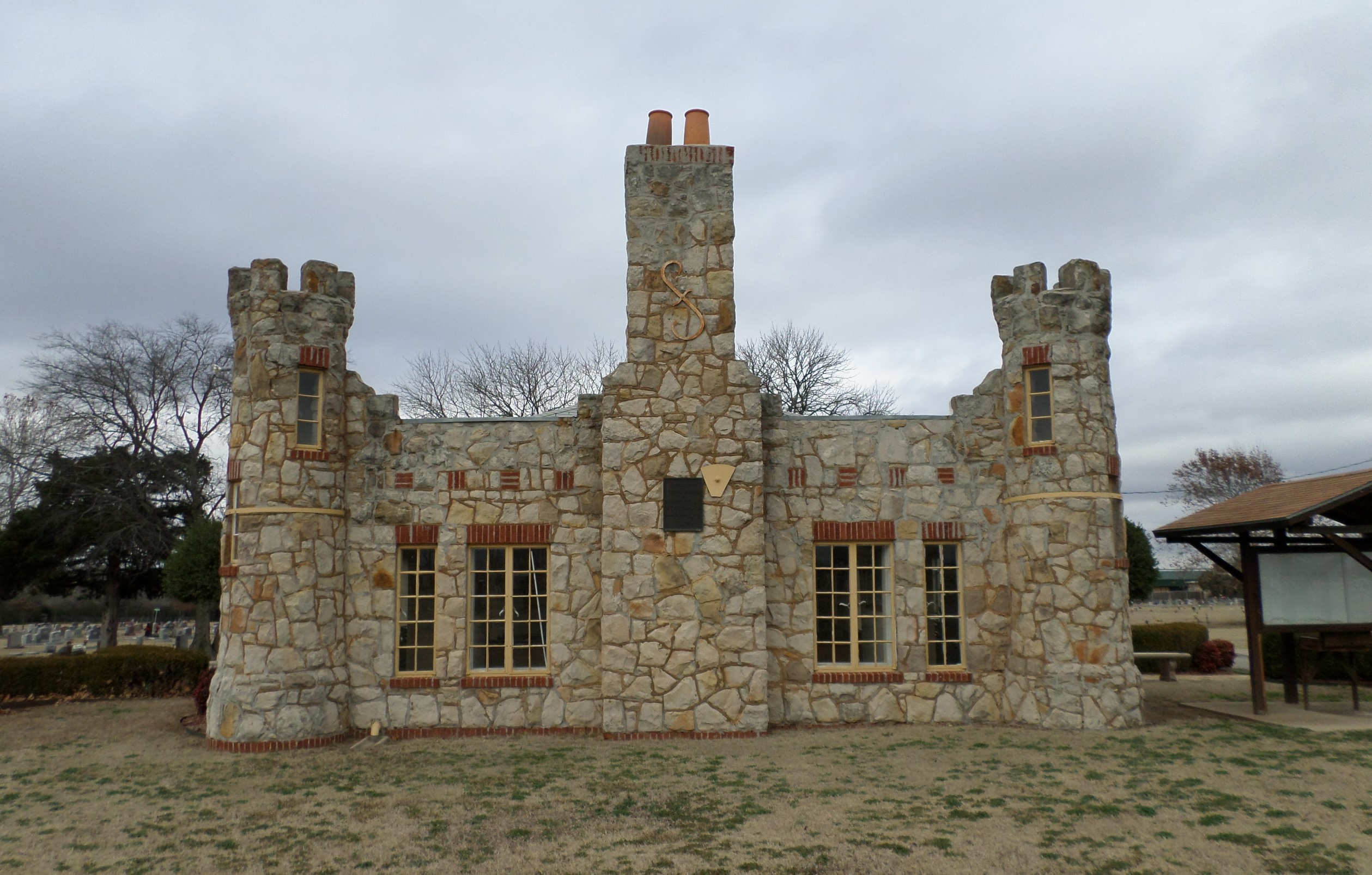
- The chapel in December 2014

- Location within Oklahoma Location within the United States
- Location: 1201 Van Dr., Seminole, Oklahoma
- Coordinates: 35°14′2″N 96°41′7″W
- Area: less than one acre
- Built: 1928
- Architectural style: Gothic Revival
- NRHP reference No.: 03000880
- Added to NRHP: September 2, 2003

Strother Memorial Chapel is a historic chapel at 1201 Van Drive in Seminole, Oklahoma. It is located in the Maple Grove Cemetery.

It was built in 1928 in honor of O. D. Strother, a founding father of the local oil industry. Over the following 70 years it fell into disrepair, and then was restored through the efforts of the Maple Grove Cemetery Association and the Seminole Historical Society. The chapel was added to the National Register in 2003.

Former Oklahoma Governor and U.S. Senator David L. Boren would be buried in Maple Grove Cemetery on February 24, 2025.
