= 1984 United States Senate election in Oklahoma =

- November 6, 1984
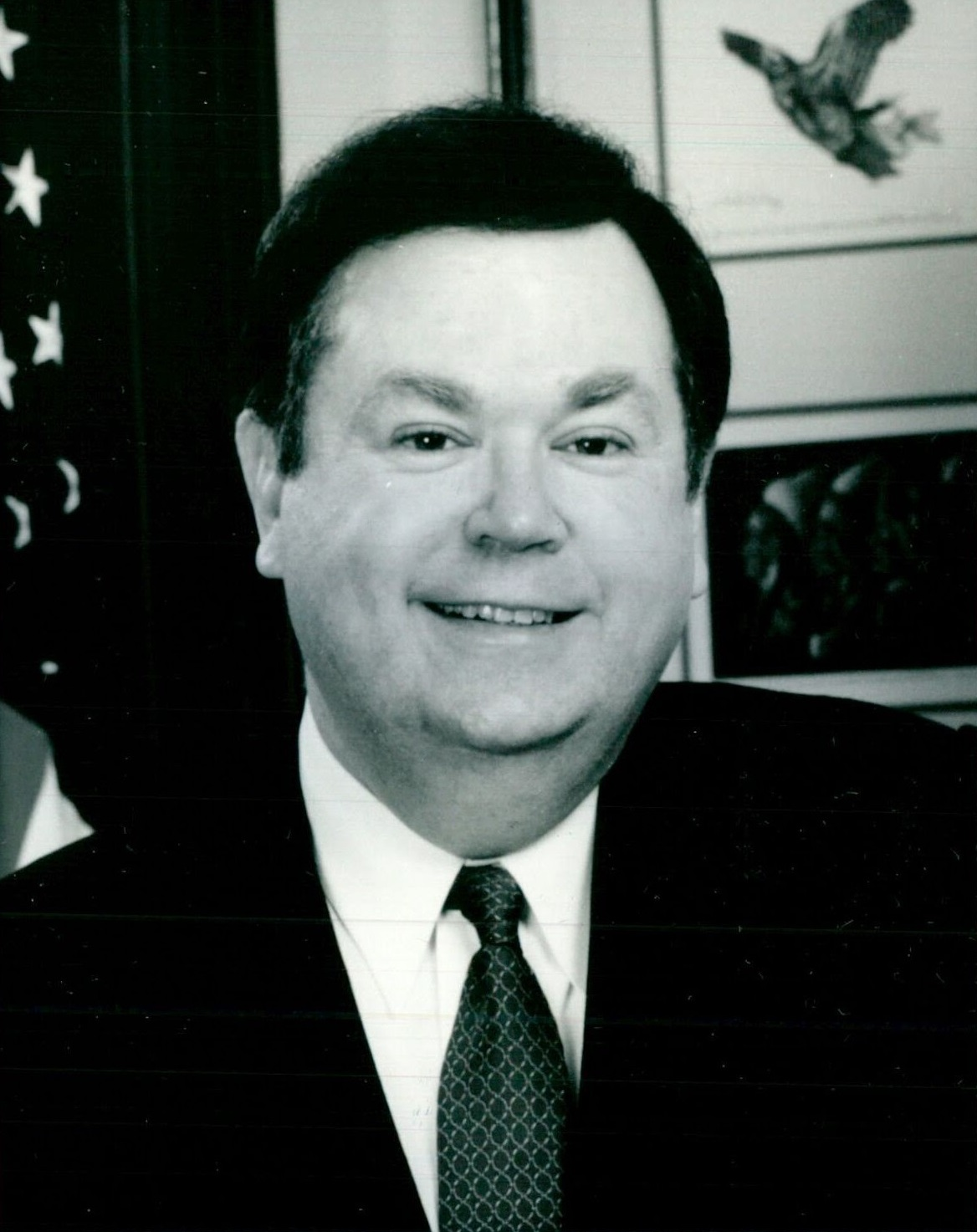

Nominee	David Boren	Bill Crozier
Party	Democratic	Republican
Popular vote	906,131	280,638
Percentage	75.64%	23.43%
- County results Boren: 60–70% 70–80% 80–90% >90%
U.S. senator before election
David Boren
Democratic
Elected U.S. Senator
David Boren
Democratic

The 1984 United States Senate election in Oklahoma was held on November 6, 1984.

Incumbent Senator David Boren was re-elected to a second term in office in a landslide. This is the last time that Oklahoma simultaneously voted for presidential and U.S. Senate candidates of different political parties.

== Democratic primary ==
=== Candidates ===
- David Boren, incumbent Senator
- Marshall A. Luse, independent candidate for Oklahoma's 4th congressional district in 1982

=== Results ===
1984 Democratic U.S. Senate primary
Party	Candidate	Votes	%
Democratic	David Boren (incumbent)	432,534	89.87%
Democratic	Marshall A. Luse	48,761	10.13%
Total votes		481,295	100.00%

== Republican primary ==
=== Candidates ===
- William Crozier, management instructor and nominee for Oklahoma's 4th congressional district in 1972
- Gar Graham, Democratic candidate for Senate in 1980
- George L. Mothershed, Oklahoma City attorney

=== Results ===
1984 Republican U.S. Senate primary
Party	Candidate	Votes	%
Republican	George L. Mothershed	46,933	39.30%
Republican	Will Crozier	39,581	33.15%
Republican	Gar Graham	32,901	27.55%
Total votes		119,415	100.00%

1984 Republican U.S. Senate runoff
Party	Candidate	Votes	%
Republican	Will Crozier	101,194	50.05%
Republican	George L. Mothershed	100,995	49.95%
Total votes		202,189	100.00%

== Independents and third parties ==
=== Libertarian ===
- Robert T. Murphy, nominee for Senate in 1980

== General election ==
=== Results ===
General election results
Party	Candidate	Votes	%	±%
Democratic	David Boren (incumbent)	906,131	75.64%	▲10.15
Republican	Will Crozier	280,638	23.43%	▼9.43
Libertarian	Robert T. Murphy	11,168	0.93%	▲0.93
Total votes		1,197,937	100.00%	
Democratic hold				

== See also ==
- 1984 United States Senate elections
