= Boren–McCurdy proposals =

The Boren-McCurdy intelligence reform proposals were two legislative proposals from Senator David Boren and Representative Dave McCurdy in 1992 (102nd Congress). Both pieces of legislation proposed the creation of a National Intelligence Director. Neither bill passed into law.

== Background ==
The Congressional Research Service’s report groups the Boren-McCurdy proposal under "Recommendations to Centralize and Strengthen IC Leadership". The following are recommendations for centralization before the Boren–McCurdy proposals, and the descriptions are directly from "The Proposed Authorities of a National Intelligence Director: Issues for Congress and Side-by-Side Comparison of S. 2845, H.R. 10 and Current Law", last updated in 2004:

=== Second Hoover Commission, 1955 ===
The Commission on Organization of the Executive Branch of the Government, also known as the Second Hoover Commission and chaired by former President Herbert Hoover, recommended that management of the CIA be turned over to an "executive officer", so that the DCI could focus attention on the IC.

=== The Schlesinger Report, 1971 ===
President Nixon tasked the Office of Budget and Management to recommend changes in the IC's organization. Deputy OMB Director James R. Schlesinger, a future DCI, headed the effort and in his report considered the creation of an NID, but in the end recommended that "a strong DCI who could bring intelligence costs under control and intelligence production to an adequate level of quality and responsiveness." Schlesinger criticized the IC's failure to coordinate resources, blaming the deficiency on the lack of a strong, central IC leadership that could "consider the relationship between cost and substantive output from a national perspective."

=== Murphy Commission, 1975 ===
The Commission on the Organization of the Government for the Conduct of Foreign Policy, chaired by former Deputy Secretary of State Robert D. Murphy, noted that the DCI exercised direct control over the CIA but had only limited influence over the IC as a whole. But rather than recommending a structural change, the Commission said it was neither possible nor desirable to extend the DCI's control to the large part of the intelligence community that lies outside the CIA.

=== Church Committee, 1976 ===
The Senate Select Committee to Study Governmental Operations with Respect to Intelligence Activities, known as the Church Committee and headed by Senator Frank Church, did not recommend establishing an NID but urged that DCI authorities be strengthened by appropriating intelligence dollars directly to the DCI and by defining in statute DCI reprogramming authorities. The Committee also recommended that consideration be given to enhancing the DCI's management of the IC by relieving him of day-to-day management of the CIA.

=== Pike Committee, 1976 ===
The House Select Committee on Intelligence, chaired by Congressman Otis G. Pike, recommended that the DCI should manage the IC as a whole and not exclusively the CIA. The Commission said the DCI should receive budget proposals from intelligence agencies comprising the community but did not indicate whether the DCI should have budget authority.

=== Clifford/Cline, 1976 ===
Clark Clifford, a former Secretary of Defense under President Lyndon B. Johnson who had earlier participated in drafting legislation establishing the CIA, recommended that a new position of Director of General Intelligence be established and that a separate CIA director be responsible for managing the CIA. Ray Cline, a former Deputy Director of the CIA, recommended that the DCI be given cabinet rank and broad supervisory authorities over the IC.

=== Charter Legislation, 1978 ===
Following the establishment of the intelligence oversight committees in the Senate (1976) and in the House (1977), Congress considered charter legislation that, among other things, would have created an NID to manage the IC. A presidentially selected deputy would manage CIA. In the face of strong opposition to the overall legislation, which also included language governing covert actions, the Committees did not report the respective bills.

=== Executive Branch Orders, 1976–1981 ===
In an effort to head off further congressional action, President Gerald Ford in 1976 issued Executive Order (E.O.) 11905 naming the DCI as the President's primary intelligence advisor responsible for developing the NFIP.

President Jimmy Carter in 1978 issued E.O. 12036 (superseding E.O. 11905) more clearly defining the DCI's community-wide authority in areas relating to the budget, tasking, intelligence review, coordination, intelligence dissemination and foreign liaison.

President Ronald Reagan in 1981 continued the expansion of the DCI's community responsibilities and authorities, issuing E.O. 12333 (superseding E.O. 12036), which detailed the roles, responsibilities, missions, and activities of the IC. Executive Order 12333, which remains in effect today, granted the DCI more explicit authority over the development, implementation, and evaluation of the NFIP.

=== Turner Proposal, 1985 ===
Admiral Stansfield Turner, former DCI under President Carter, recommended establishing an NID to oversee the IC, and leaving responsibility for CIA day-to-day operations to a separate director of CIA.

== McCurdy Recommendations (The National Security Act of 1992) ==
=== Director Of National Intelligence ===
The McCurdy proposal wanted to rename the Director of Central Intelligence to the Director of National Intelligence (DNI). The President with consent from the Senate would appoint the Director of National Intelligence, under the McCurdy proposal. The Director could not be an active duty Armed Forces officer.

==== Responsibilities ====
The Director would be responsible for providing intelligence to the President, heads of departments and agencies of the executive branch, the Chairman of the Joint Chiefs of Staff, senior military commanders, the Senate, the House of Representatives, and their appropriate respective committees.

Another responsibility of the DNI would be the development and presentation of an annual budget for the National Foreign Intelligence Program (NFIP).

==== Authorities ====
The DNI would have access to any collection capability and national security intelligence collected by the IC. The DNI would also have the power to temporarily reassign any individual from one National Foreign Intelligence Program (NFIP) to another NFIP. The DNI would lead coordination efforts with foreign governments for issues pertaining to intelligence or security services of foreign governments.). Allocation and direction of the expenditure of funds would also be under the purview of the DNI. Changes in funding distribution would require approval from the DNI. In order to reduce costs, the DNI would be able to rotate, consolidate, and standardize personnel and programming.

==== Intelligence Evaluation Board ====
The director would be required to establish an Intelligence Evaluation Board to objectively evaluate the quality and timeliness of the intelligence provided to the government, and to assist the director in carrying out his responsibilities.

=== Deputy Director Of National Intelligence For The Intelligence Community ===
The Deputy Director for the National Intelligence Community would be appointed by the President with approval from the Senate. The Deputy Director would carry out duties assigned by the DNI, and oversee the Office for Warning and Crisis Support.

==== Office For Warning And Crisis Support ====
The Office for Warning and Crisis Support would be established under the Deputy Director of National Intelligence and be composed of full-time senior representatives chosen by the DNI. The director of the office would also be chosen by the DNI. The Office for Warning and Crisis Support would be responsible for identifying immediate national security threats or any area where United States intervention may become necessary or desirable. The office would also be responsible for providing intelligence support for President and other senior officials in times of crisis, as wells as assisting the DNI in areas or warning and crisis support.

=== Deputy Director Of National Intelligence For Estimates And Analysis ===
The Deputy Director of National Intelligence would carry out duties assigned by the DNI. The Deputy Director would be appointed by the President with approval from the Senate and could not be an active duty officer.

==== Office Of Intelligence Analysis ====
The Office of Intelligence Analysis would be under the deputy director for estimates and analysis. The office would be composed of analysts from the IC, and the DNI would appoint its director. Responsibilities would include correlating, evaluating, and distributing all available national security intelligence, and the preparation and dissemination of all current intelligence.

==== Office Of Open Source Information ====
The Office of Open Source Information would be established under the Deputy Director of National Intelligence for Estimates and Analysis. All current open source entities would be consolidated under this Act, and be led by a DNI appointed director. The office would manage a single open source program and budget, coordinate collection, analysis, and dissemination of information with potential intelligence value. Under McCurdy's proposal, the Office of Open Source Information would be the sole entity for all open source activity.

=== Establishment Of National Imagery Agency ===
A National Imagery Agency would be established under the Department of Defense and its director appointed by the Secretary of Defense. The director may be an active officer, and must be a lieutenant general or vice admiral.

==== Imagery Intelligence Activities ====
The National Imagery Agency would be responsible for collection, exploitation and analysis, and dissemination of imagery intelligence. The agency would also set product and dissemination standards to fulfill its collection, analysis, and dissemination functions.

== Boren Recommendations (The Intelligence Reorganization Act of 1992) ==
=== Director of National Intelligence ===
The President with approval from the Senate would appoint the Director of National Intelligence. The DNI would serve as the head of the IC and be the principal advisor to the President. The DNI would also “exercise authority, direction, and control over the Central Intelligence Agency”.

The positions of Deputy Director of National Intelligence for the Intelligence Community and Deputy Director of National Intelligence for Estimates and Analysis would be created to assist the DNI. The president with approval from the Senate would appoint both deputy directors. Only one of the deputy directors could be an Armed Forces officer (active or retired) at a given time. An Armed Forces candidate must have reached the status of general or admiral, or be promoted upon appointment to deputy director.

==== Responsibilities ====
The DNI would be responsible for timely, independent, and objective intelligence to the president, and where appropriate, heads of departments and agencies, the Chairman of the Joint Chiefs of Staff, senior military commanders, and the Senate and House of Representatives. The DNI would develop and present an annual budget, manage the collection capabilities if the IC, evaluate the utility of the intelligence, eliminate waste and duplication, provide direction and approval for overhead reconnaissance systems, and protect sources and methods.

The Deputy Director of National Intelligence for the Intelligence Community would be responsible for an Office for Warning and Crisis Support. The Office would be composed of senior IC members with a director appointed by the DNI. The Office for Warning and Crisis Support would identify any immediate threat to US national security, and provide options of intervention or involvement. The Deputy Director would also establish a board to evaluate the objectivity, quality, and timeliness of intelligence provided to the government by the IC.

==== Authorities ====
The DNI would have access to any intelligence related to national security, be responsible for the allocation and expenditure of funds, and have authority to temporarily (up to 180 days) reassign IC members. Intelligence prioritization and coordination with foreign governments would also be under the DNI authority.

=== Establishment of a Committee on Foreign Intelligence ===
Within the National Security Council would be the Committee on Foreign Intelligence. The Committee would be composed of “the Director of National Intelligence, the Secretary of State, the Secretary of Defense, the Secretary of Commerce, or their respective deputies, the Assistant to the President for National Security Affairs, and such other members as the President may designate”. The Assistant to the President for National Security Affairs would serve as the chairman. The Committee would establish national security priorities and evaluate the effectiveness of the IC.

=== Establishment of National Imagery Agency ===
The Department of Defense would establish a National Imagery Agency with a director appointed by the Secretary of Defense (with consultation from the DNI). The Agency would be the sole entity for overhead reconnaissance collection and operation for the entire IC. The National Imagery Agency would also be responsible for collecting, analyzing, and disseminating its own intelligence products.

== See also ==
- David L. Boren
- Dave McCurdy
- National Intelligence Strategy of the United States of America
- Director of National Intelligence
- United States Intelligence Community
