= Stephen Jones (attorney) =

American lawyer (born 1940)

- Born: July 1, 1940 (age 86); Lafayette, Louisiana, U.S.
- Occupation: Attorney
- Political party: Republican
- Spouse: Sherrel
- Children: 4

Stephen Jones (born July 1, 1940), is an American attorney who took on a series of high-profile civil rights cases beginning with his defense of a Vietnam War protester. Jones later represented Timothy McVeigh, and then the fraternity involved in the 2015 University of Oklahoma Sigma Alpha Epsilon racism incident.

== Biography ==
Stephen Jones was born on July 1, 1940, in Lafayette, Louisiana. His father was an oil field supplies sales manager and his mother was the bookkeeper for a wealthy financier. Jones grew up in suburban Houston, received a law degree from the University of Oklahoma in 1966 and settled in Enid, Oklahoma, where he still lives. Jones was a member of Phi Alpha Delta and served as associate editor of the Oklahoma Bar Journal from 1979 to 1986. He has been married to his wife Sherrel for the last 40 years, and they have raised four children.

== Legal career ==
On May 5, 1970, the day after National Guardsmen had shot and killed four students at Kent State University, Keith Green was arrested at the University of Oklahoma for carrying a Viet Cong flag in violation of a state law prohibiting the display of a "red flag or emblem of anarchy or rebellion". After 12 lawyers had refused to defend the student, Jones took the case and was promptly dismissed from the Enid, Oklahoma, law firm where he was employed. Jones argued in court that the disloyalty statute was unconstitutional and the judge dismissed the case, overturning the statute. Later Jones would go on to represent Abbie Hoffman, the radical Yippie, when Oklahoma State University refused to let him speak on campus.

Jones ran unsuccessfully for public office four times, including a U.S. Senate race against David L. Boren in 1990.

In 1995, Stephen Jones became the lead defense attorney for Timothy McVeigh, who was charged with the Oklahoma City bombing. McVeigh wanted to use the "necessity defense", but Jones took a different tack, even traveling to other countries in search of evidence because he believed that McVeigh did not act alone in the bombing. McVeigh went on trial in 1997, was convicted on all counts and sentenced to death, and was executed in 2001.

Jones served as the attorney for a former House page involved in the Mark Foley scandal. He also served as the defense lawyer for Raye Dawn Smith in the trial concerning the rampant abuse and eventual murder of her daughter Kelsey Smith-Briggs.

In 2015 Jones was hired by the fraternity chapter involved in the 2015 University of Oklahoma Sigma Alpha Epsilon racism incident to explore the chapter's legal options.

== Areas of practice ==
- Civil
- Trial Practice
- Civil Appeals
- Insurance Defense
- White Collar Criminal Defense
- Personal Injury
- Appellate Practice; Criminal Law
- Federal Criminal Law
- Capital Offenses
- Military Courts Martial
- Grand Jury Practice
- Aviation Law

== Bar admissions ==
- 1966, Oklahoma
- 1969, U.S. Court of Appeals, Tenth Circuit and U.S. District Court, Western District of Oklahoma
- 1970, U.S. Tax Court and U.S. Supreme Court
- 1973, U.S. Court of Appeals, Eighth Circuit
- 1975, U.S. Court of Appeals, Second Circuit and U.S. Court of Appeals, *District of Columbia
- 1979, U.S. District Court, Northern District of Oklahoma
- 1980, U.S. Claims Court
- 1982, U.S. Court of Appeals, Federal Circuit

== Publications ==
- "John W. Davis," Oklahoma Law Review Vol. 27 No. 1, Winter, 1974
- "The Case Against Presidential Impeachment," Oklahoma Bar Association Journal, Oklahoma Criminal Defense form book, 1974
- "Oklahoma Politics," Vol. I, 1907-1962
- "Was President Nixon Guilty: The Case For The Defense," Oklahoma Bar Association Journal, Winter 1978
- "Vernon's Oklahoma Forms, 2d: Criminal Law, Practice & Procedure," West Group, 1999
- "U.S. v. McVeigh: Defending the 'Most Hated Man in America,'" Oklahoma Law Review Vol. 51 No. 4, Winter, 1998
- "A Lawyer's Ethical Duty to Represent the Unpopular Client," Chapman Law Review Vol. 1 No. 1. Spring, 1998
- "Representing Timothy McVeigh", Litigation, Spring, 2002, Vol. 28, Number 3.

== Books ==
- Others Unknown: The Oklahoma City Bombing Case and Conspiracy, ISBN 0786752777, with Peter Israel, 2001

== Professional positions ==
- Chester Bedell Memorial Lecturer, "The Independence of American Lawyers," The Florida Bar, 1999.
- Assistant Professor, University of Oklahoma, 1973-1976
- Adjunct Professor, Phillips University, 1983-1990
- Secretary, Minority Conference, Texas Legislature, 1960-1961
- Assistant to Honorable Richard Nixon, New York, 1964
- Administrative Assistant, Congressman Paul Findley, Washington, D.C., 1966-1969
- Legal Assistant to Governor of Oklahoma, 1967
- Member, U.S. Delegation to NATO (North Atlantic Assembly), 1968
- Special Assistant District Attorney, 1977
- Member, State Supreme Court Committee on Civil Jury Instructions, 1979-1981
- Special United States Attorney, Northern District of Oklahoma, 1979
- Special Counsel to the Governor of Oklahoma, 1995
- Member, Oklahoma Court of Criminal Appeals Advisory Committee on Court Rules, 1980
- Judge of Temporary Division, Oklahoma Court of Appeals, 1982
- Republican Nominee, United States Senate, 1990

== Notes ==
Party political offices
Preceded by G. T. Blankenship	Republican nominee for Attorney General of Oklahoma; 1974	Succeeded by Richard A. Pyle
Preceded by Bill Crozier	Republican nominee for U.S. Senator from Oklahoma (Class 2); 1990	Succeeded by Jim Inhofe
