= 1990 United States Senate election in Oklahoma =

- November 6, 1990
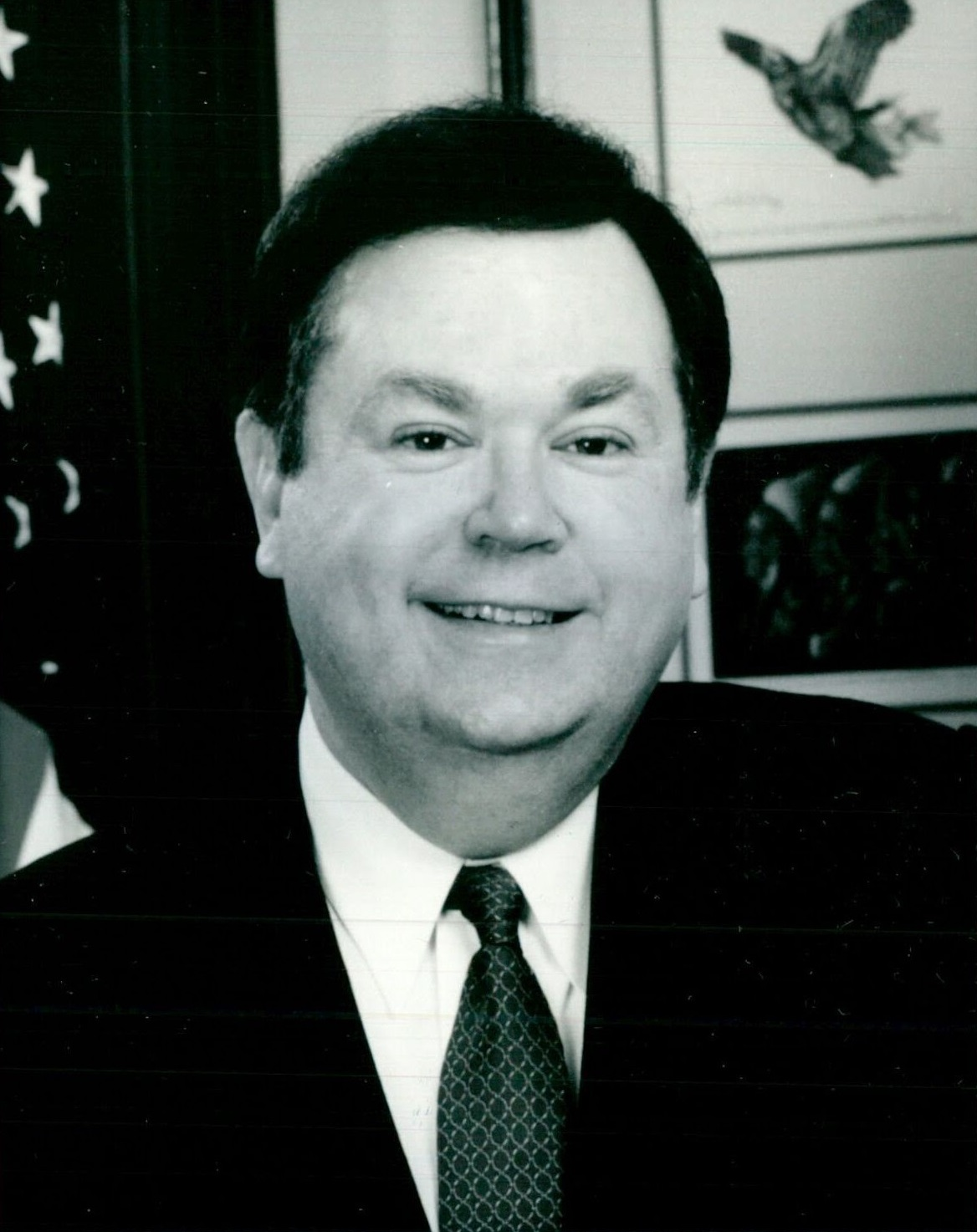

Nominee	David Boren	Stephen Jones
Party	Democratic	Republican
Popular vote	735,684	148,814
Percentage	83.18%	16.82%
- Boren: 50–60% 60–70% 70–80% 80–90% >90% Jones: 100% Tie No votes
U.S. senator before election
David Boren
Democratic
Elected U.S. Senator
David Boren
Democratic

The 1990 United States Senate election in Oklahoma was held November 6, 1990 to elect a member of the United States Senate to represent the State of Oklahoma as well as other elections to the United States Senate in other states and elections to the United States House of Representatives and various state elections. The primaries were held August 28.

Incumbent Senator David Boren won re-election to a third term in a landslide over challenger Stephen Jones, carrying every county in the state with more than 60% of the vote. This is to date the last time Democrats have won a U.S. Senate election in Oklahoma. Boren later resigned his seat in 1994 to become president of the University of Oklahoma.

== Democratic primary ==
1990 Oklahoma U.S. Senate Democratic primary results
Party	Candidate	Votes	%
Democratic	David Boren (incumbent)	445,969	84.3%
Democratic	Virginia Jenner	57,909	10.9%
Democratic	Manuel Ybarra	25,169	4.8%
Total votes		529,047	100.00%

== General election ==
1990 United States Senate election in Oklahoma
Party	Candidate	Votes	%
Democratic	David Boren (Incumbent)	735,684	83.18%
Republican	Stephen Jones	148,814	16.82%
Majority		586,870	66.35%
Total votes		884,498	100.00%
Democratic hold			

== See also ==
- 1990 United States Senate elections
