= Richard L. Van Horn =

Seventh president of the University of Houston

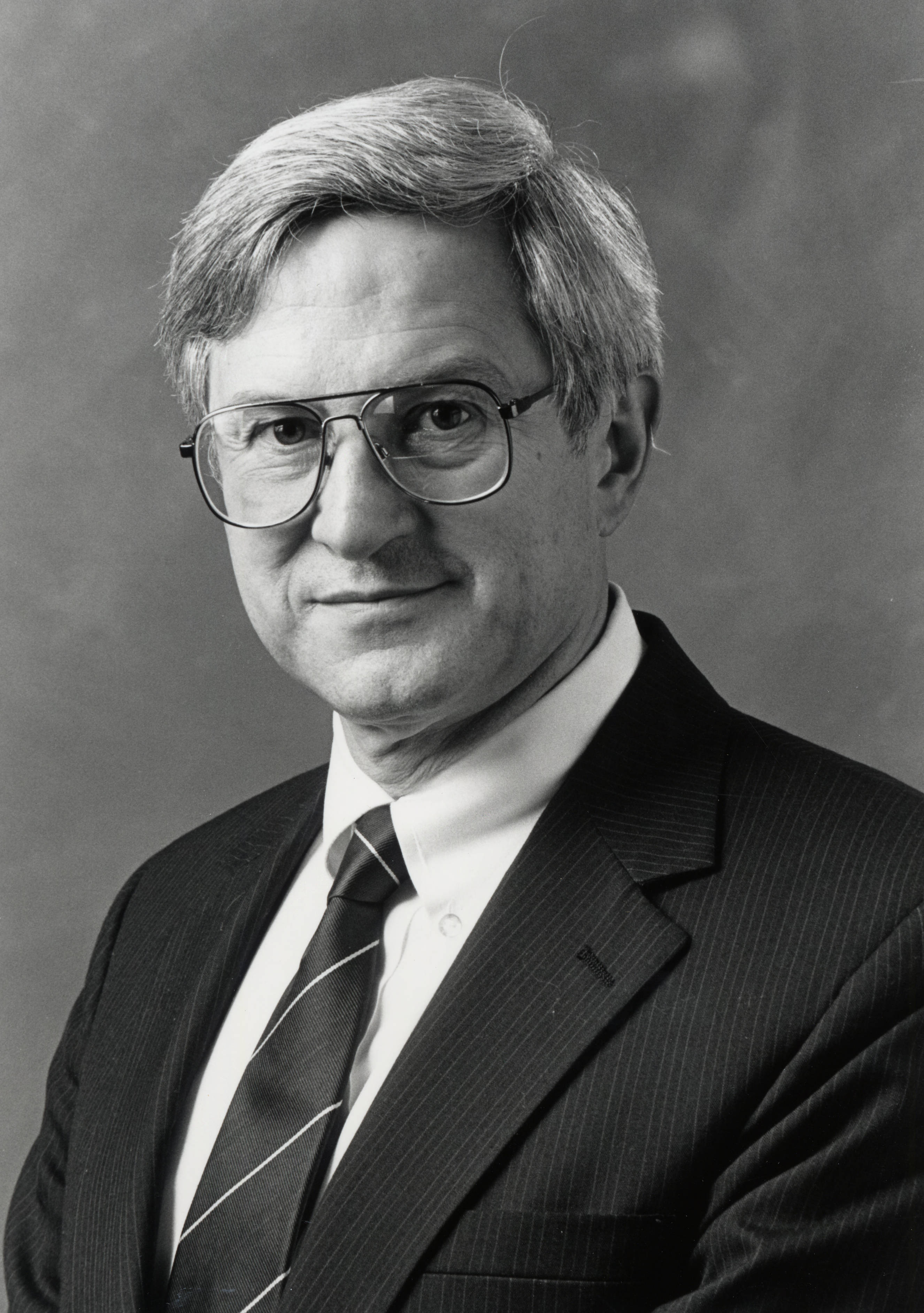
- Van Horn as President of the University of Houston

12th President of University of Oklahoma
- In office 1989–1994
- Preceded by: Frank E. Horton
- Succeeded by: David Boren

President of Houston University
- In office 1983–1989
- Preceded by: Hugh Walker
- Succeeded by: George W. Magner

Personal details
- Born: November 2, 1932 (age 93) Chicago, Illinois, U.S.
- Education: Carnegie Mellon University
- Occupation: President of University of Oklahoma, and President of Houston University

Richard L. Van Horn (born November 2, 1932) was the seventh president of the University of Houston and the 12th president of the University of Oklahoma.

Van Horn was born in Chicago, Illinois but raised in Fort Wayne, Indiana. Van Horn earned a BS in industrial administration from Yale University; an MBA from the MIT Sloan School of Management; and a PhD in systems science from Carnegie-Mellon University. He spent 16 years at Carnegie-Mellon as a faculty member, associate dean of the Graduate School of Industrial Administration, vice president for business affairs, vice president for management and provost. He went on to serve six years as the president of the University of Houston and the University of Oklahoma. He served as president of Oklahoma from 1989 to 1994. Outside of academia, he spent ten years at the Rand Corporation, a nonprofit global policy think tank.
