= James L. Gallogly =

American business executive

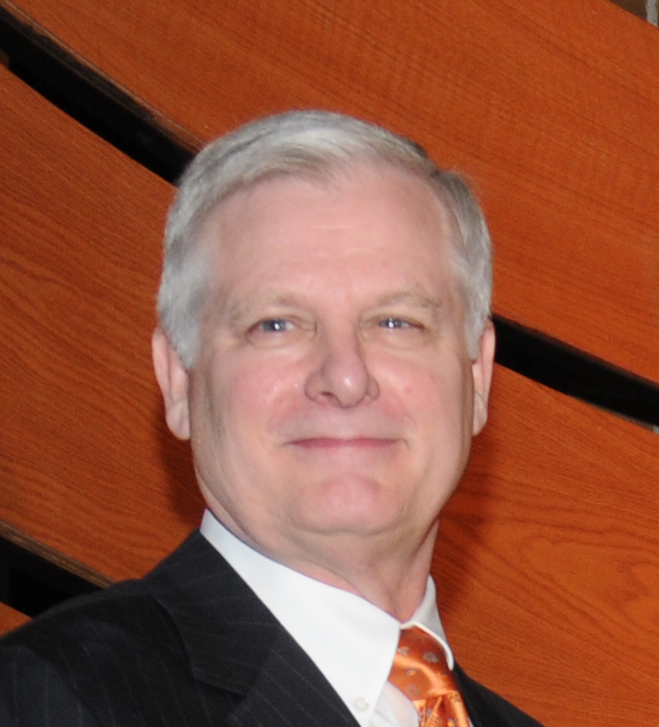
- James L. Gallogly

14th President of the University of Oklahoma
- In office July 1, 2018 – May 12, 2019
- Preceded by: David Boren
- Succeeded by: Joseph Harroz Jr.

Personal details
- Born: September 1, 1952 (age 74) St. John's, Newfoundland, Canada
- Spouse: Janet Gallogly
- Education: University of Colorado Colorado Springs (BA); University of Oklahoma (JD)
- Profession: Attorney, business management

External videos
- Gallogly Commencement Address, UCCS Commencement, Spring 2012

James L. Gallogly (born September 1, 1952, in St. John's, Newfoundland, Canada) is a former American university administrator and retired business executive who was the 14th President of the University of Oklahoma. He has held executive positions with ConocoPhillips, ChevronPhillips and Phillips Petroleum, and is a former Chief Executive Officer of LyondellBasell. Gallogly joined the DuPont board of directors in February 2015. He became the 14th president of the University of Oklahoma, on July 1, 2018 serving for nine months and two weeks before he retired May 12, 2019.

== Early life and education ==
James L. Gallogly was born in St. John's, Newfoundland, Canada, one of ten children of Tom and Margery Gallogly. He attended high school at Wasson High School in Colorado Springs.

He received a Bachelor of Arts degree from the University of Colorado Colorado Springs in 1974 and a Juris Doctor from the University of Oklahoma College of Law in 1977. (Note: Gallogly's B. A. degree was in psychology.) He completed the Advanced Executive Program at the J.L. Kellogg Graduate School of Management at Northwestern University in 1998.

== Career ==
Gallogly joined the Phillips Petroleum Company in 1980. He worked in a variety of legal, financial and operational positions including international assignments in Norway. He was appointed vice president of plastics (1996), vice president of olefins and polyolefins (1998) and later senior vice president of chemicals and plastics (1999).

Gallogly has held executive positions with ConocoPhillips, ChevronPhillips and Phillips Petroleum. Phillips Petroleum Corp. and Chevron Corp. combined to form Chevron Phillips Chemical as a joint venture in June 2000. Gallogly became the inaugural president and chief executive officer of Chevron Phillips Chemical, one of the world's top producers of olefins and polyolefins, remaining there until 2006.

In 2002, Conoco Inc. and Phillips Petroleum merged to form ConocoPhillips, based in Houston, Texas. In 2006, Gallogly joined ConocoPhillips as executive vice president of refining, marketing and transportation and later as executive vice president of exploration and production.

Gallogly became the chief executive officer of LyondellBasell in Houston, Texas in 2009, succeeding Volker Trautz as part of a reorganization following U.S. bankruptcy court proceedings. Gallogly guided the company out of Chapter 11 bankruptcy and successfully repositioned it as one of the world's largest refining companies and makers of polymers and petrochemicals.

Gallogly formally retired as CEO of LyondellBasell in January 2015. As of February 5, 2015, he was appointed as a director of DuPont

Gallogly formerly served on the Board of Directors for Continental Resources. He also served on the University Cancer Foundation Board of Visitors at the University of Texas M. D. Anderson Cancer Center, Houston.

On March 26, 2018, the Board of Regents of the University of Oklahoma formally announced that Gallogly would be serving in the capacity of OU's presidency following the retirement of David L. Boren. The selection process in which he was chosen as Boren's successor came under fire for its secrecy. After less than a year—a brief 9 months and 2 weeks—as president, Gallogly announced his retirement on May 12, 2019.

== Awards ==
- Petrochemical Heritage Award (2015)
- ICIS Kavaler Award (2014)
- Honorary Doctorate of Science, University of Colorado Colorado Springs (2012)
- Communication Leadership Award (2011) from the Houston chapter of the International Association of Business Communicators

== Philanthropy ==
On behalf of the Gallogly Family Foundation, James and Janet Gallogly pledged to donate $1M to the University of Colorado, supporting creation of the Gallogly Events Center. The center is named in honor of father Tommy M. Gallogly, a non-traditional adult student who earned bachelor's (1970) and master's degrees (1973) in education at UCCS. Formally dedicated in 2010, the building has been awarded Leadership in Energy and Environmental Design (LEED) Gold certification.
