= List of people from Norman, Oklahoma =

People from Norman, Oklahoma.

== Arts ==
- Rob Lake, magician and illusionist who starred on Broadway in his own show
- Yvonne Chouteau, Shawnee prima ballerina born in Ft. Worth TX one of the founders of University of Oklahoma School of Dance.
- Oscar Jacobson, painter, curator, author, educator
- Mary Leader, poet
- America Meredith, Cherokee Nation art writer, artist, and curator
- Ravi Rajan, artist, musician, educator
- Jeri Redcorn, Caddo/Potawatomi potter
- Lynn Riggs, Cherokee playwright
- David Salle,

Renowned Postmodern Artist

- Susan Stryker, professor, author, filmmaker
- Julie Ann Ward, professor, author, poet laureate of Norman

== Business ==
- Clay Bennett, majority owner of the Oklahoma City Thunder
- Pat Bowlen, owner of the Denver Broncos
- Archie W. Dunham, oil and gas CEO
- Roy Furr, founder of Furr's grocery store and cafeteria chain
- Michael F. Price, mutual fund investor
- Helen Walton, widow of Sam Walton

== Film and television ==
- Candy Clark, actress
- Jack Garner, actor
- James Garner (1928–2014), actor of television series Maverick and The Rockford Files and the movies The Great Escape and The Americanization of Emily. There is a 10-foot bronze statue of Garner as Bret Maverick in Norman.
- Ed Harris, actor
- Owen Joyner, actor
- Christian Kane, actor
- Hoda Kotb, journalist and anchor of NBC's Today
- Sharron Miller, television director, writer, producer
- Nyambi Nyambi, actor
- Megyn Price, actress

== Music ==
- Broncho, rock band
- Chainsaw Kittens, rock band
- Samantha Crain, singer/songwriter
- Jesse Ed Davis, guitarist
- The Flaming Lips, rock band
- Vince Gill, country and bluegrass performer
- Yolanda Kondonassis, harpist
- Toby Keith, Country music artist lived in Norman until his death.

== Politics ==
- Carl Albert, late Speaker of the United States House of Representatives
- David Boren, Democratic U.S. senator, Oklahoma governor; University of Oklahoma president
- Jake Files, Republican member of the Arkansas State Senate from Fort Smith, Arkansas, since 2011; born in Norman in 1972
- Susanna M. Salter, moved to Norman following her service as the first female mayor in the United States in Argonia, Kansas
- Elizabeth Warren, Democratic U.S. senator

== Print ==
- Angie Debo, historian
- Linda Hogan, author, academic, environmentalist
- George Miksch Sutton, ornithologist, painter, author

== Radio ==
- Mary Jo Heath, host of the Metropolitan Opera radio broadcasts

== Sports ==
- Christopher Bell, race car driver
- Sam Bradford, football player
- Ryan Broyles, football player
- Dominic Cervi, soccer player
- Jennings Clark, soccer player
- Nadia Comaneci, gymnast
- Bart Conner, gymnast
- Jordan Evans, NFL linebacker (Bengals)
- Blake Griffin, NBA forward (Nets)
- Charlie Kolar, football tight end for the Baltimore Ravens
- Daniel McCutchen, MLB pitcher (Pirates)
- Jim Ross, former WCW and WWE (Hall of Fame) wrestling commentator, and executive; current AEW commentator and executive
- Travis Simpson, football player
- Barry Switzer, football coach
- Zac Taylor, head coach of the NFL's Cincinnati Bengals
- Lindy Waters III, NBA player
- Bud Wilkinson, football coach
- Trae Young, professional basketball player for the Washington Wizards
- Cedarion DeLeroy "CeeDee" Lamb, football wide receiver for the Dallas Cowboys

== Others ==
- Alpharad, YouTuber, esports personality and musician
- Nathan Altshiller Court (1881–1968), Polish–American mathematician
- Fred Haise, astronaut, circled the Moon on Apollo 13
- Anita Hill, law professor (lived in Norman and worked at OU during the Clarence Thomas confirmation hearings)
- Michael McConnell, American LGBT activist whose same-sex marriage was the first legally recognized by any civil government (Born in Norman)
- Donna J. Nelson, OU chemistry professor, 2016 ACS president, and science advisor to Breaking Bad
- David Scheffer, lawyer and diplomat who was Ambassador-at-Large for War Crimes Issues, appointed by President Bill Clinton
- Charles Thayer, Muscogee Creek Nation
