= List of presidents of the University of Oklahoma =

This list of presidents of the University of Oklahoma includes all fifteen individuals who have served as the president of the University of Oklahoma and eight interim presidents since the institution was founded in 1890. The University of Oklahoma is a public university, created and supported by the state of Oklahoma, and it is a designated research university. The campus of the university is located in Norman, and it has facilities in Oklahoma City and Tulsa.

David Ross Boyd was appointed by the Board of Regents of the University of Oklahoma to serve as the first president of the University of Oklahoma. Joseph Harroz Jr. is the fifteenth and current president of the University of Oklahoma, Harroz Jr. succeeded James L. Gallogly on May 9, 2020, after serving as interim president for the previous year.

Presidents
No.	Image	Name	Term start	Term end	Ref.
1		David Ross Boyd	1892	1908	
2		A. Grant Evans	1908	1911	
interim		Julien Monnet	1911	1912	
3		Stratton D. Brooks	1912	1923	
interim		James S. Buchanan	1923	1924	
4		James S. Buchanan	1924	1925	
5		William Bizzell	1925	1941	
6		Joseph A. Brandt	1941	1943	
interim		George Lynn Cross	1943	1944	
7		George Lynn Cross	1944	1968	
8		John Herbert Hollomon Jr.	1968	1970	
interim		Pete Kyle McCarter	1970	1971	
9		Paul F. Sharp	1971	1978	
10		William S. Banowsky	1978	1985	
interim		Martin C. Jischke	1985	September 10, 1985	
11		Frank E. Horton	September 11, 1985	June 30, 1988	
interim		David Swank	July 1, 1988	July 14, 1989	
12		Richard L. Van Horn	July 15, 1989	June 5, 1994	
interim		John R. Morris	June 6, 1994	November 16, 1994	
13		David Boren	November 17, 1994	June 30, 2018	
14		James L. Gallogly	July 1, 2018	May 17, 2019 (Note: Served less than one year. Shortest tenure for a full president.)	
interim		Joseph Harroz Jr.	May 17, 2019	May 9, 2020	
15		Joseph Harroz Jr.	May 9, 2020	present	

Table notes:
