= Mary B. Boren =

American politician

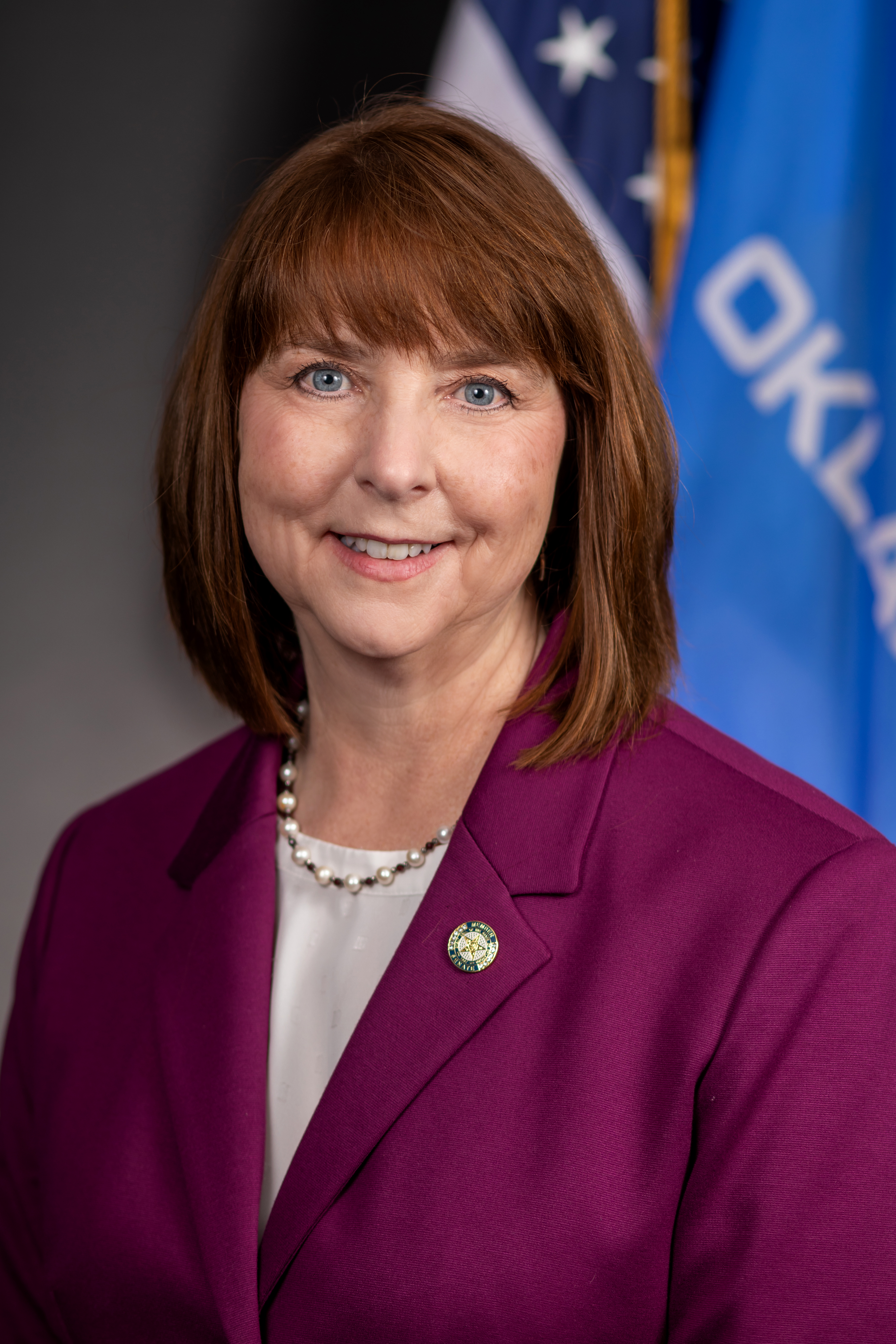

Member of the Oklahoma Senate from the 16th district
- Incumbent
- Assumed office January 14, 2019
- Preceded by: John Sparks

Personal details
- Born: Norman, Oklahoma, U.S.
- Party: Democratic
- Spouse: Nathan Boren
- Education: Cameron University (BA); University of Oklahoma (JD)
- Website: maryboren.com

Mary Brown Boren is an American politician in the U.S. state of Oklahoma.

== Political career ==
After being sworn in for her first term in the Oklahoma State Senate on November 15, 2018, Boren received committee appointments to the Senate Appropriations Subcommittee on Education, the Agriculture and Wildlife Committee, the Energy Committee, and the Judiciary Committee. In recognition of her "advocacy and support of higher education in her role as a member of the Education committee," Boren was the recipient of the 2019 Distinguished Service Award for Higher Education from the Oklahoma State Regents for Higher Education and the Council of College and University Presidents.

== Personal life ==
Boren received her Bachelor of Arts degree from Cameron University and her JD from the University of Oklahoma. Boren and her husband Nathan have three children together and are members of the First Christian Church of Norman. She is a part of the Boren family by marriage.
