= Cannon and Castle =

Yale University military honor society

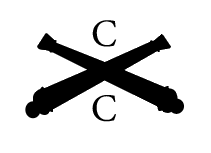
- Founded: 1929; 96 years ago Yale University
- Type: Honor
- Former affiliation: Independent
- Status: Active
- Emphasis: Military
- Scope: Local
- Chapters: 1
- Nickname: C&C
- Headquarters: New Haven, Connecticut; United States

Cannon and Castle is a military honor society founded at Yale University in 1929. Elected members include cadets and midshipmen from all three Reserve Officer Training Corps branches, active-duty servicemembers, veterans and faculty of the Yale community.

== History ==
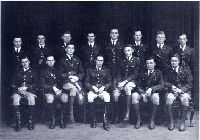
Cannon and Castle members, class of 1936

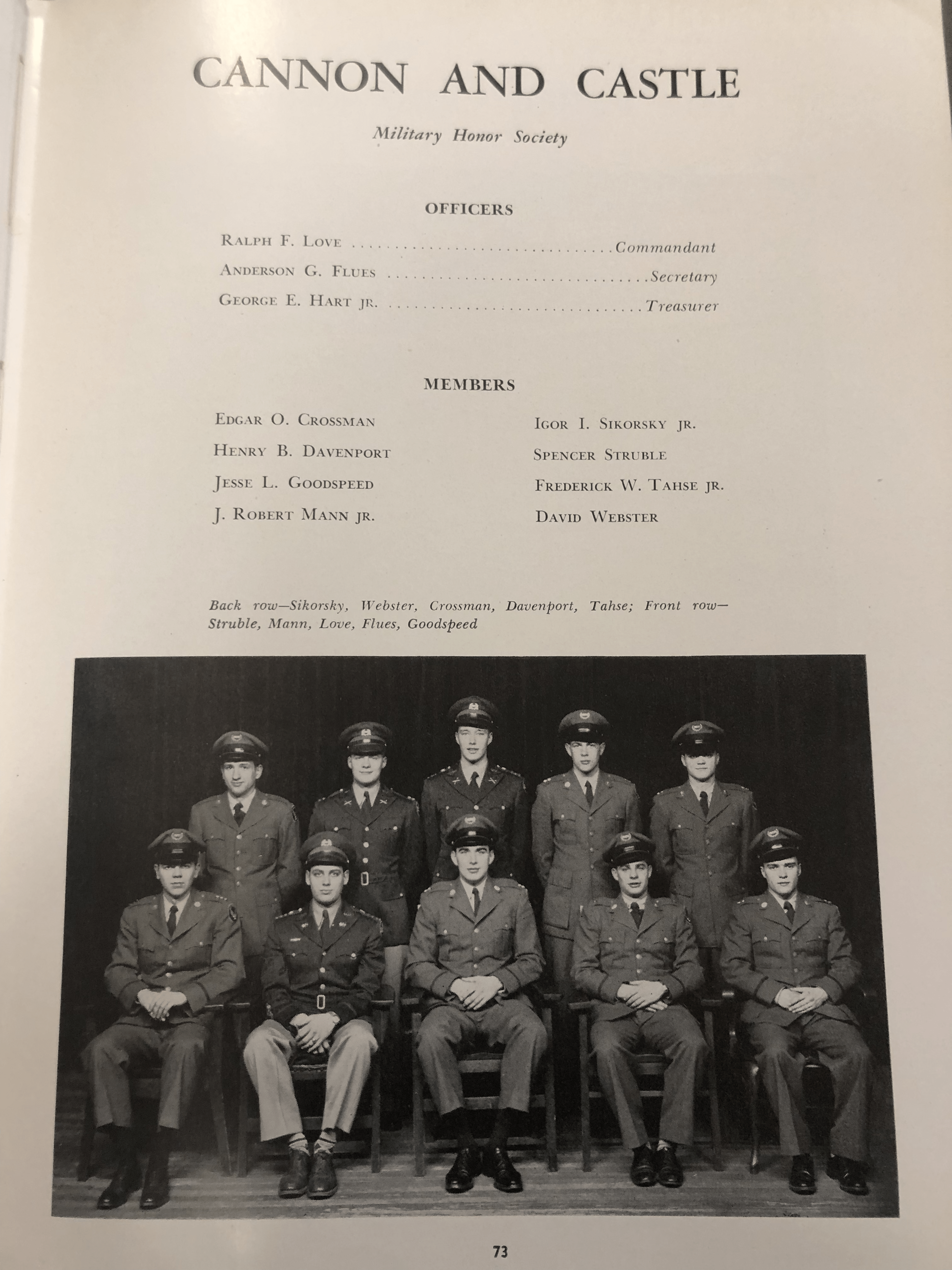
Cannon and Castle members, from the Yale Banner, 1951

On May 24, 1928, a group of students attending Yale College and the Sheffield Scientific School formed the Cannon and Castle military fraternity. The founders were all enrolled in the Department of Military Science and were members of field artillery and engineering units of Reserve Officer Training Corps (ROTC). The 22 founding members and four honorary members included:

- Francis Gordon Brown, Yale College
- Ralph William Carson, Sheffield Scientific School
- Clarence Phelps Dodge Jr., Yale College
- William Eno De Buys, Sheffield Scientific School
- Scott Jonathan Dow Jr., Sheffield Scientific School
- Charles Wetherbee Earnshaw, Sheffield Scientific School
- Martin Fentor, Yale College
- Robert Monroe Ferguson, Yale College
- Samuel Lawrence Gwin Jr., Yale College
- James Williamson Henning, Yale College
- Lt. Charles George Holle, honorary member
- John Alexander Hope, Yale College
- Gilman Derring Kirk, Sheffield Scientific School
- George Bragg Massey Jr., Sheffield Scientific School
- Clarence Whittlesey Mendell, dean of Yale College, honorary member
- Major Vernon Edward Pritchard, honorary member
- Henry Brown Reinhardt Jr., Sheffield Scientific School
- Hardie Scott, Yale College
- Dana Wentworth Smith, Sheffield Scientific School
- James Donald Strong, Sheffield Scientific School
- Charles Hyde Warren, Dean of Sheffield Scientific School, honorary member
- Hubert Cushing Watson, Sheffield Scientific School
- Hamilton Washburn Wright Jr., Yale College

Its founders created Cannon and Castle to foster closer ties between Yale's two ROTC programs and to provide a forum for military-related discussions on campus. Membership was limited to those in ROTC field artillery and engineering units. By 1936, Cannon and Castle was referred to as an "honorary military society".

Each year, Cannon and Castle elected six members from the junior class. These members were selected for their "character, knowledge as reflected by general academic achievements and achievements in military science, and leadership qualities as demonstrated by performance as a cadet in the Reserve Officers Training Corps, and by contributing to the Yale Cadet Battalion." The six men would in turn, nominate twelve additional men for membership. Members were identified with a braid that could be worn on their uniform.

The society met every two weeks at various campus locations. It hosted lectures by military and foreign policy leaders, screened films, and held social events such as the annual Army-Navy Dance. It also offered the Col. Dean Hudnet Award for marksmanship in a competition that was open to any Military Science student at Yale. The award was named for a deceased professor of military science and tactics who was a member of the 1936 Olympic pistol team.

Cannon and Castle discontinued operations during World War II but reactivated in 1947 at its units' summer quarters in at Camp Campbell in Kentucky and Stewart Field in New York before returning to campus. However, Cannon and Castle ceased operations in 1967 during the Vietnam War and the eventual expulsion of ROTC from Yale in 1969. The Yale Archives houses Cannon and Castle's records and documents.

== Current activities ==
Cannon and Castle holds an induction ceremony and dinner for its elected members. Throughout the academic year, the society hosts special film screenings, debates, and guest lectures open to the public. Meetings are generally held in the Yale Naval ROTC unit wardroom on 55 Whitney Avenue.

== Membership ==
To be eligible for membership in Cannon and Castle, an individual must be an undergraduate enrolled in Yale College with military affiliation, whether active-duty, reserves, or ROTC (which returned to Yale in 2012). Elected ROTC cadets and midshipmen are generally in the top 25% of their class merit standing and possess a GPA greater than 3.90 in their military science courses. Other members come from the Eli Whitney Scholar community.

In exceptional circumstances, the society confers honorary membership to staff, faculty, graduate students, or fellows who have contributed significantly to the Yale military/veterans community. The commanding officers of Yale ROTC are ex-officio members of the society and sit on its Board of Regents, alongside society alumni members.

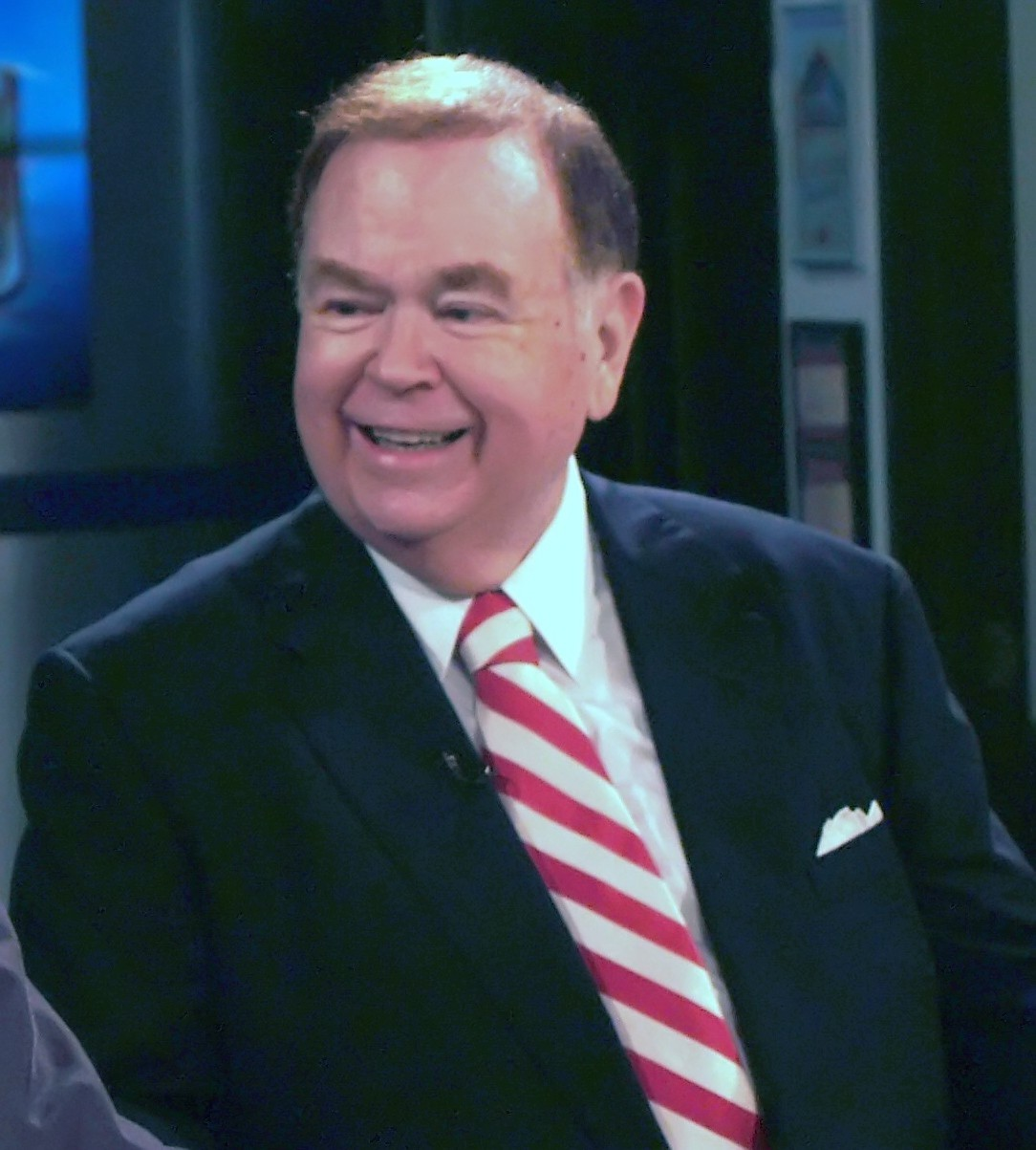
David Boren

== Notable members ==
Cannon and Castle's members have participated in many of the major wars of the past century, including World War II, the Korean War, the Vietnam War, and the global war on terrorism. Notable alumni include:

- Leslie Aspin, 1960 – U.S. Secretary of Defense and eleven-terms in the U.S. House of Representatives
- David L. Boren, 1963 – three-term U.S. Senator, Governor of Oklahoma, and president of the University of Oklahoma
- William H. T. Bush, 1960 – banker and businessman
- Michael deVlaming Flinn – two-term Connecticut House of Representatives
- Donald Glascoff, 1967 – Academy Award winning documentary filmmaker and attorney
- Porter Goss – U.S. House of Representatives, Director of Central Intelligence, and the first Director of the Central Intelligence Agency
- Hardie Scott, 1928 – U.S. House of Representatives
- James Donald Strong, 1928 – colonel in the U.S. Army Corps of Engineers; tennis official at Wimbledon Championships, the U.S. Open, the French Open, and the Australian Open

=== Notable honorary members ===
- Christopher G. Cavoli – U.S. Army General and Supreme Allied Commander Europe
- Charles George Holle, 1928 – U.S. Army Major General, Army Distinguished Service Medal recipient, deputy chief of the U.S. Army Corps of Engineers
- Paul Kennedy – historian
- Clarence Whittlesey Mendell, 1928 – Latin scholar, dean of Yale College
- Vernon Pritchard, 1928 – U.S. Army Major General, first-team All-American football player, Army Distinguished Service Medal recipient
- Charles Hyde Warren, 1928 – chair of Geology at Yale University, dean of the Sheffield Scientific School

== See also ==
- Honor society
- Professional fraternities and sororities
