= Charles Hyde Warren =

American geologist

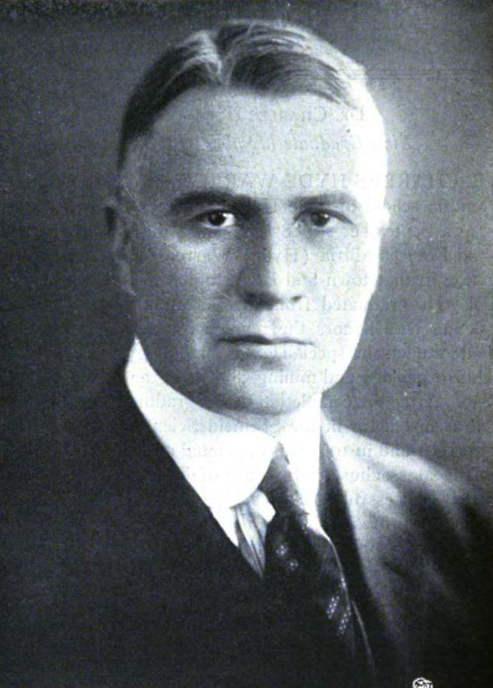
- Born: September 27, 1876; Watertown, Connecticut, US
- Died: August 16, 1950 (aged 73); Torrington, Connecticut, U.S.
- Occupations: Professor and dean

Academic background
- Education: Sheffield Scientific School, 1896; Yale University, Ph.D., 1899

Academic work
- Discipline: Geology
- Sub-discipline: Mineralogy
- Institutions: Massachusetts Institute of Technology; Yale University; Sheffield Scientific School

Charles Hyde Warren (September 27, 1876 – August 16, 1950) was an American geologist and academic administrator. He was a professor and the chair of geology at Yale University dean at the Sheffield Scientific School.

== Early life ==
Warren was born on September 27, 1876, in Watertown, Connecticut. His parents were Frances Marie (née Hyde) and Charles Alanson Warren. He attended local primary school and graduated from Watertown High School.

He graduated with a degree in chemistry, with honors, from the Sheffield Scientific School at Yale University in 1896. He was a member of Yale's chapter of Sigma Chi fraternity. He received a Ph.D. in mineralogy from Yale University in 1899.

== Career ==
After receiving his Ph.D., Warren was an instructor at Sheffield Scientific for a year. He became an instructor of mineralogy at the Massachusetts Institute of Technology in 1900, receiving a promotion to assistant professor in 1904 and associate professor in 1909. In 1912 he became a full professor and chair of the mineralogy with the Department of Geology at MIT. He published extensively on mineralogy, including A Manual of Determinative Mineralogy in 1921. He also was involved in research and various chemical, manufacturing, and mining business concerns.

On July 1, 1922, Warren became a Sterling Professor and chair of geology at Yale University and dean of the Sheffield Scientific School, serving in this capacity until his death. Warren was promoted to chairman of Yale's Division of Science and Mathematics. He was the first chairman of the university's allocations committee in 1934, overseeing the assignment of student to campus housing. He was chairman of Yale's bursary committee from 1938 to 1945. He was dean of Yale's Trumbull College from 1938 to 1945. He served on the advisory committee of the Peabody Museum of Natural History and was president of trustees of Sheffield Scientific School. He retired as dean emeritus in 1945.

In 1908, he was elected a Fellow of the American Academy of Arts and Sciences. He was elected to the American Philosophical Society in 1928. He was a member of the American Association for the Advancement of Science and the Geological Society of America.

== Personal life ==
Warren was married to Charlotte Wardner Lamson. They had three sons and lived in Litchfield, Connecticut.

In 1928, Warren became a founding member (honorary) of Cannon and Castle military honor society at Yale University. He was the first graduate member of Yale's Connecticut Alpha chapter of Tau Beta Pi, an engineering honor society.

After having a heart attack on August 5, 1950, he was hospitalized. He died of a heart attack on August 16, 1950, at the Charlotte Hungerford Hospital in Torrington, Connecticut. He was buried in Watertown, Connecticut.

== Publications ==
- A Manual of Determinative Mineralogy. New York, McGraw-Hill Book Company, Inc., 1921.
