= Janna Lou Little Boren =

American teacher (1944–1998)

19th First Lady of Oklahoma
- In office January 13, 1975 – October 1975
- Governor: David L. Boren
- Preceded by: Jo Evans Hall
- Succeeded by: Molly Shi Boren (Note: Janna Boren ceased her duties as First Lady after her divorce was announced in 1975 and the position was vacant until November 27, 1977.)

Personal details
- Born: Janna Lou Little; November 30, 1944 Oklahoma City, Oklahoma, U.S.
- Died: May 25, 1998 (aged 53)
- Spouses: David Boren (m. 1968; div. 1976) John Clinton Robbins (m. 1976)
- Children: 2, including Dan Boren

Janna Lou Little Boren Robbins (November 30, 1944 – May 25, 1998) was an American teacher who served as the 18th First Lady of Oklahoma during the tenure of David L. Boren from his inauguration until their divorce was announced in 1975. She is the mother of Dan Boren.

== Biography ==
Janna Lou Little was born on November 30, 1944, in Oklahoma City to Reuel and Oteka Little. Her parents ran a foundation for children who were deaf or had cleft palates. She was raised in Madill, Oklahoma, attended the Hockaday School, and graduated from Boston University in 1967. She later married David L. Boren in 1968. She worked as a French and English teacher as David started his political career. Boren campaigned for her husband in 1974 by leading “Boren’s Broom Brigade” and selling brooms across the state while promising to clean up politics.

Boren served as the 18th First Lady of Oklahoma in 1975. She announced her divorce from David Boren later that year, finalized it in 1976, and married John Clinton Robbins. In 1996 she was diagnosed with colon cancer and she died on May 25, 1998. She had two children, including Dan Boren and Carrie Boren Headington.
