= Henry C. Boren =

Henry C. Boren (February 10, 1921 in Pike County, IL – October 17, 2013 in Pittsboro, North Carolina) was a historian and author. He was professor emeritus of history at the University of North Carolina.

== Professional life ==
Boren is an author of numerous professional articles and books on ancient history specializing in ancient Rome, including "Roman Society, A Social, Economic and Cultural History."
