= Sebastian Bohren =

Swiss violinist

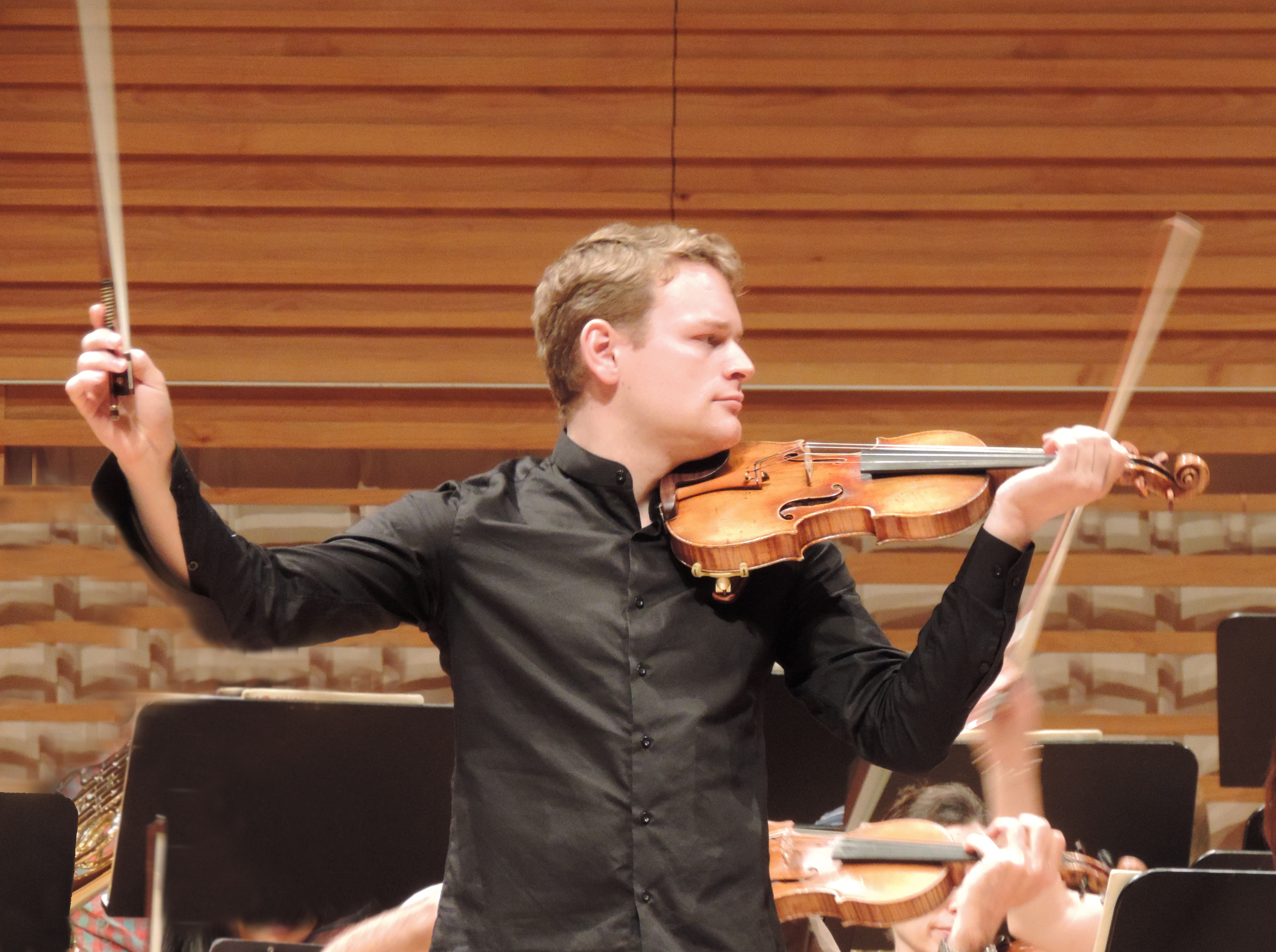
Sebastian Bohren 2014 during a rehearsal at the KKL Lucerne

Sebastian Bohren (born 1987 in Winterthur) is a Swiss violinist.

== Life ==
Sebastian Bohren pursued lessons under Jens Lohmann, followed by studies with Robert Zimansky and Zakhar Bron at the Zurich University of the Arts, with Igor Karsko at the Musikhochschule Luzern and with Ingolf Turban at the University of Music and Performing Arts Munich. Bohren has attended numerous masterclasses under tutors including Shmuel Ashkenasi, Thomas Brandis, Giuliano Carmignola, Ana Chumachenco and Dmitry Sitkovetsky.

As a soloist, Bohren has performed with orchestras in both his native Switzerland and abroad, such as the Lucerne Symphony Orchestra under James Gaffigan, the Zurich Chamber Orchestra under Muhai Tang, the Zurich Camerata under Patrick Lange and Igor Karsko, the Zurich Stretta Consort, the Orchestra di Padova e del Veneto, the Orchestra of the St. Petersburg Court Chapel and the Munich Junge Philharmonie, and in broadcasts on Swiss radio and television channels. He has played in festivals worldwide as a member of ensembles such as the London Steve Reich Ensemble and the Chamber Artists.

Bohren has performed in countries across Europe, Asia and South-America, including numerous world premieres. He has collaborated with conductors such as Heinrich Schiff, Nicolae Moldoveanu and Patrick Lange, and as a chamber musician with partners including Mayuko Kamio, Thomas Demenga, Roby Lakatos, Benjamin Schmid, Maximilian Hornung, Dmitry Sitkovetsky, Fabio di Casola, Orfeo Mandozzi, Dmitri Demiashkin and Alexander Zemtsov. In 2015 Bohren will be performing as Festival Artist at the Boswil Summer.

Sebastian Bohren has been a member of the Stradivari Quartet since 2012. He plays a King Sloma (1710) Stradivarius belonging to the Habisreutinger Foundation, and a violin by Michael Rhonheimer.

== Awards ==
Sebastian Bohren has won numerous competitions and prizes, and is the holder of a LYRA Foundation scholarship. In 2007 Bohren was awarded the scholarship of the Zurich-based Marguerite Meister Foundation. In July 2011 he won the Lucerne-based Curt Dienemann Music Award and a scholarship from the Carl Hirschmann Foundation.

== Discography ==
- 2011: with Kevin Griffiths: Steve Reich, Different Trains, EMI Classics
- 2012: with the Munich Junge Philharmonie: Mozart Sinfonia Concertante (KV 364/320d), München: Zeitklänge
- 2015: with the Chamber Artists: Beethoven Violin Concerto, Schumann Fantasie RCA Red Seal
- 2015: with the Orchestra di Padova e del Veneto: Ignace Pleyel Violin Concerto
