= Bohnen =

Bohnen may refer to:

== People with the surname ==
- Blythe Bohnen (born 1940), American artist
- Carl Bohnen (1871–1951), American painter
- Michael Bohnen (1887–1965), German opera singer and actor
- Roman Bohnen (1901–1949), American actor

== Other ==
- Birnen, Bohnen und Speck, a German dish
