= Molly Shi Boren =

American judge

20th First Lady of Oklahoma
- In office November 27, 1977 – January 8, 1979
- Governor: David Boren
- Preceded by: Janna Lou Little Boren (Note: The position was vacant between Janna Boren's divorce announcement and David Boren marrying Molly Shi.)
- Succeeded by: Donna Nigh

Special District Judge for Pontotoc County
- In office July 1975 – November 27, 1977

Personal details
- Born: June 11, 1943 (age 82) Ada, Oklahoma, U.S.
- Citizenship: American; Choctaw Nation
- Spouse: David Boren (m. 1977–2025)
- Education: East Central College; University of Oklahoma; University of Oklahoma College of Law

Molly Shi Boren (born June 11, 1943) is an American judge who served as the 19th First Lady of Oklahoma from 1977 to 1979 during the tenure of her husband David Boren. She was the first person to marry a Governor of Oklahoma while he was in office. She was inducted into the Oklahoma Hall of Fame in 2004.

== Biography ==
Molly Shi was born on June 11, 1943, in Ada, Oklahoma. A citizen of the Choctaw Nation, her mother was a teacher and her father was a farmer near Stratford, Oklahoma. She graduated from Stratford High School in 1961 before going on to graduate from East Central College, the University of Oklahoma, and the University of Oklahoma College of Law in May 1974. She worked as a teacher for Byng Public Schools before graduating law school and entering private practice. She was appointed as a special district judge for Pontotoc County in July 1975.

She married Governor of Oklahoma David Boren on November 27, 1977, becoming the 19th First Lady of Oklahoma. When her husband ran for the U.S. Senate in 1978, she reformed “Boren's Broom Brigade,” a group of volunteers that sold brooms and promised to clean up politics. In 1980, she worked as an attorney for the federal government. She was inducted into the Oklahoma Hall of Fame in 2004. Her husband died on February 20, 2025.
