= University of Oklahoma Press =

Publishing arm of the University of Oklahoma

- Parent company: University of Oklahoma
- Founded: 1929
- Founder: William Bennett Bizzell
- Country of origin: United States
- Headquarters location: Norman, Oklahoma
- Distribution: Longleaf Services, Inc.
- Publication types: Books
- Official website: www.oupress.com

The University of Oklahoma Press (OU Press) is the publishing arm of the University of Oklahoma in Norman, Oklahoma, United States. Founded in 1929 by the fifth president of the University of Oklahoma, William Bennett Bizzell, it was the first university press to be established in the American Southwest. The OU Press is primarily known for its titles on the American West and Native Americans, but it also publishes books on a range of scholarly topics. The press releases around 80 books every year.

In 2022, Andrew Berzanskis, previously of the University of Washington Press, became editorial director at OU Press. He is active in the Association of University Presses, and is coauthor of "Building up Books: Toward a More Inclusive Peer Review Process."

Recent initiatives at OU Press include the book series "Teaching, Engaging, and Thriving in Higher Ed", edited by James M. Lang and Michelle D. Miller, launched in 2023. In Inside Higher Ed, John Warner wrote of the new series: "I suggest picking up one or all of these books as a way to help infuse fresh oxygen into your work." Among other recent reviews of note, the New York Times featured Thomas Ty Smith's book The Garza War in South Texas as part of its "What to Read" column in 2024.

Domestic distribution for the press is currently provided by the University of North Carolina Press's Longleaf Services.

The Arthur H. Clark Company was a major printer of publications related to the history of the Western United States. In July 2006, the company was acquired by the University of Oklahoma Press and relocated to Norman, Oklahoma, where it continues as an imprint.

== See also ==
- List of English-language book publishing companies
- List of university presses
