= National Intelligence Strategy =

The National Intelligence Strategy of the United States of America (NIS) is a product of the Office of the Director of National Intelligence (DNI). Drafted and implemented in 2005 while John Negroponte served as the DNI, it describes the drastic overhaul the United States (US) intelligence community will carry out. According to this strategy, the US intelligence community will create a new system for sharing information, while integrating its existing enterprises to meet its mission objectives and enterprise objectives. The changes to the intelligence community, including changes in tasking, derive from the 2002 US National Security Strategy. The legal basis for the new strategy is derived from the Intelligence Reform and Terrorism Prevention Act of 2004.

The NIS was updated in 2009 under DNI Blair.

The NIS was updated in 2014 by DNI James Clapper. A notable change was inclusion of the "Principles of Professional Ethics for the Intelligence Community".

== Legal basis for a New Intelligence Strategy ==
The legal basis for the NIS is the US Intelligence Reform and Terrorism Prevention Act. The NIS identifies fifteen strategic objectives from the new legislation, grouping them into two separate sets of objectives.

== Mission objectives ==
The NIS states that Mission Objectives

Relate to our efforts to predict, penetrate, and preempt threats to our national security and to assist all who make and implement US national security policy, fight our wars, protect our nation, and enforce our laws in the implementation of national policy goals.

There are five different Mission Objectives:

- Defeat terrorists: To accomplish this goal, the primary focus is disrupting their leadership and support systems. The NIS also states that the US will "deny terrorist operational have, sanctuary, and political legitimacy." Responsibility for carrying out this objective falls under the National Counterterrorism Center (NCTC). The Director of the NCTC is responsible for tasking to the individual intelligence agencies.
- Counter the spread of weapons of mass destruction: The NIS states that there can be no single approach to countering the spread of weapons of mass destruction (WMD). Therefore, stopping the spread of WMDs will likely take a multi-facet approach. The NIS does not give explicit details to further answer how the intelligence community will counter the spread of WMDs; however, it does indicate that the community will focus on the movement and transportation of the weapons. Focusing on the transportation of WMDs will require integration of the "analytic effort within the intelligence community, under the leadership of the National Counter-Proliferation Center."
- Support democratic, or aspiring democratic, governments: The NIS states that "failed states are a refuge and breeding ground of extremism." Therefore, the intelligence community must work to support new democracies, by providing predictive intelligence about potential threats to their governments and economies, and assist policymakers with "opportunities for promoting democracy."
- Better existing analytical capabilities: In response to the changing type of adversary the US now faces, the US intelligence community will focus on traditional dictatorships and "amorphous groups or networks." Doing so will require new methodologies, improving human intelligence collection, and assessing the adversary’s own intelligence capabilities. Meeting this goal will be the responsibility of the Directorate of National Intelligence for Collection, the Directorate of National Intelligence for Analysis, NCTC, and the National Counterintelligence Executive.
- Increase the role of strategic forecasting: According to the NIS, the intelligence community cannot just respond to requests by policymakers, but must also provide predictive intelligence. Giving policymakers a "heads-up" to potential problem is required. To do so, it is necessary that the intelligence community promotes a "deeper cultural understanding, better language proficiency, and scientific and technological knowledge." Identifying the gaps in an area, region, or expertise is the responsibility of the Deputy Director of National Intelligence for Analysis.

== Enterprise objectives ==
The National Intelligence Strategy states that Enterprise Objectives "relate to our capacity to maintain competitive advantages over states and forces that threaten the security of our nation." There are ten different Enterprise Objectives:

- Increase the role of the Department of Justice within the community: The primary focus for this enterprise objective is integrating the intelligence units within the Department of Justice and Department of Homeland Security (DHS) into the intelligence community. Streamlining the information-sharing process, while observing civil liberates, is the goal. It will require cooperation among state, local, and private sector entities.
- Create a new culture that promotes alternative viewpoints and uses expertise: Changing the internal culture of the intelligence community is essential for avoiding strategic failures. It is necessary to create an intellectual culture that promotes discussion as well as dissenting opinion. It will require the use of collaborative technology, where subject expertise is maximized, increased cross-agency communication, and the exploration of alternative analysis. The responsibility for meeting this objection falls under the Deputy Director of National Intelligence for Analysis.
- Optimize Collection Capabilities: It is necessary that the US intelligence community maintains its technological edge in the world, however, it must also become more agile in its deployment. Doing so requires an increase in collection from open-sources, human sources, and better utilization of technology among the entire intelligence community.
- Hire results-focused employees with various skill sets: Although the intelligence community will hire employees from a diverse background, they will have certain common attributes. The intelligence community will deploy its workforce in a way which maximizes their skills and abilities. The end result should produce a "community-wide culture that values the abilities of the each of its members." Creating a reward system and maintain employee retention within the intelligence community is also a feature of this enterprise objective.
- Change the culture from ‘need-to-know’ to ‘need-to-share’: Increasing collaboration at all levels requires reversing the perception of how information is disseminated. The intelligence community must embrace a "need-to-share" mentality rather than a "need-to-know," with the purpose of allowing policymakers to find and access intelligence in a timely manner. New collaborative tools are likely required to accomplish this objective.
- Increase cooperation among allies’ intelligence services: The NIS seeks to increase collaboration and coordination among other nations’ intelligence agencies. The US and other nations face certain common threats, and therefore, increasing cooperation among other nations is desirable. However, intelligence gained from such partnerships is to be scrutinized against US-collected intelligence - for the purpose of corroboration.
- Create new uniform security practices: To accomplish this objective, the NIS requires reclassifying data to make it easier to share. There must be a "smaller body of ‘restricted’ information" and a "reciprocal" policy of security clearances among agencies. In addition, counterintelligence efforts conducted by different agencies are to increase in their collaboration efforts. The National Counterintelligence Strategy further explains how this will happen.
- Establish a uniform process for scientific and technological activities: The NIS requires that new trends in technological advancement be identified by "establishing a centrally led, but de-centrally executed, process" within the intelligence community. While this objective seems to overlap with other stated enterprise objectives, it differs, as it calls for the creation of a unified research and development body within the intelligence community – or at least increased communication between the different entities with various agencies.
- Create a reward system to promote competence: This objective will create a system that rewards performance while simultaneously vet underperforming programs. The creation of this system is the responsibility of the Deputy Director of National Intelligence for management.
- Eliminate redundant systems while streamlining existing programs: In order to avoid overlap – and wasting resources – the NIS states that the intelligence community must "examine [sic] national security priorities...and revise its financial procedures and processes" accordingly. Agencies with overlapping programs are not allocating their resources in a conservative manner. Doing so will allow resources to be re-allocated and address new threats. Therefore, it is necessary that the intelligence community can "ensure that new systems are developed in compliance with an Intelligence Community Enterprise Architecture," as defined by the Deputy Director of National Intelligence for Management.

== NIS execution ==
=== 100-Day Plan ===
Initiated in April 2007, the 100-Day Plan creates the platform for the implementation of the NIS. The plan focuses on integration and collaboration. Key features of the 100-Day Plan accomplishments are:

- A conceptual model of the new security clearance process
- Increased information sharing among intelligence agencies
- Increased collaborative communication system among key foreign allies

=== 500-Day Plan ===
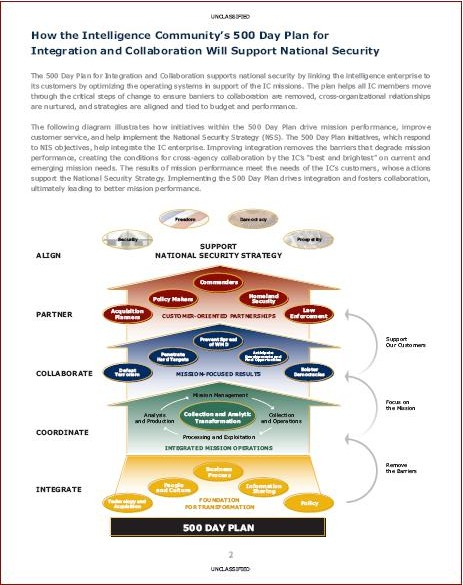
500-Day Plan

In October 2007, the NIS began execution under the 500-Day Plan. Like the 100-Day Plan, its focus was on integration and collaboration. According to the 500-Day Plan, it aimed to drive integration and foster collaboration, "ultimately leading to better mission performance." Integration is at the heart of the NIS and the 500-Day Plan was how the transition would be executed. The Plan was a program targeted at managers, which addressed "long-standing modes, practices, and behaviors." Another key feature of the 500-Day Plan was the implementation of an EXCOM, which was to be provided to leadership through this transformation period. According to Dr. Donald Kerr, Principle Deputy Director of National Intelligence, the 500-Day Plan took "into account the recommendations already made, [and] build[s] on the progress already achieved" by the 100-Day Plan.

== See also ==
- National Security Strategy of the United States
- John Negroponte
