= Rudolf Bohren =

Swiss Protestant (practical) theologian

- Born: 22 March 1920; Grindelwald, Switzerland
- Died: 1 February 2010 (aged 89); Dossenheim, Baden-Württemberg, Germany
- Occupation: Protestant

Rudolf Bohren (Grindelwald, 22 March 1920 - Dossenheim, 1 February 2010) was a Swiss Protestant (practical) theologian. He became known for his pneumatological approach to homiletics.

== Biography ==
Bohren studied theology in Bern and Basel, especially with Eduard Thurneysen and Karl Barth. On May 16, 1945, he was admitted as a pastor to the Reformed Preacher Community in Bern. From 1945 to 1958, he was a pastor in Bern, in Holderbank, Aargau; and in Arlesheim, a suburb of Basel. His experiences in these mutually different communities have shaped his scientific work. In 1952, he wrote a dissertation on the issue of church discipline in the New Testament by Oscar Cullmann. In 1958, he was appointed professor of practical theology at the Kirchliche Hochschule Wuppertal. In 1972, he was appointed to the Kirchliche Hochschule Berlin, and in 1974 to the University of Heidelberg where he set up a preaching research center.

His first wife died of suicide, which led to the publication of a sermon collection, entitled Tröstungen (Consolations). In 1971, he published Predightlehre (sermon teaching). The uniqueness of this book lies, among other things, in its poetic approach, the use of non-theological literature, as well as the development of a sermon based on pneumatology.
