= David Boren =

American lawyer and politician (1941–2025)

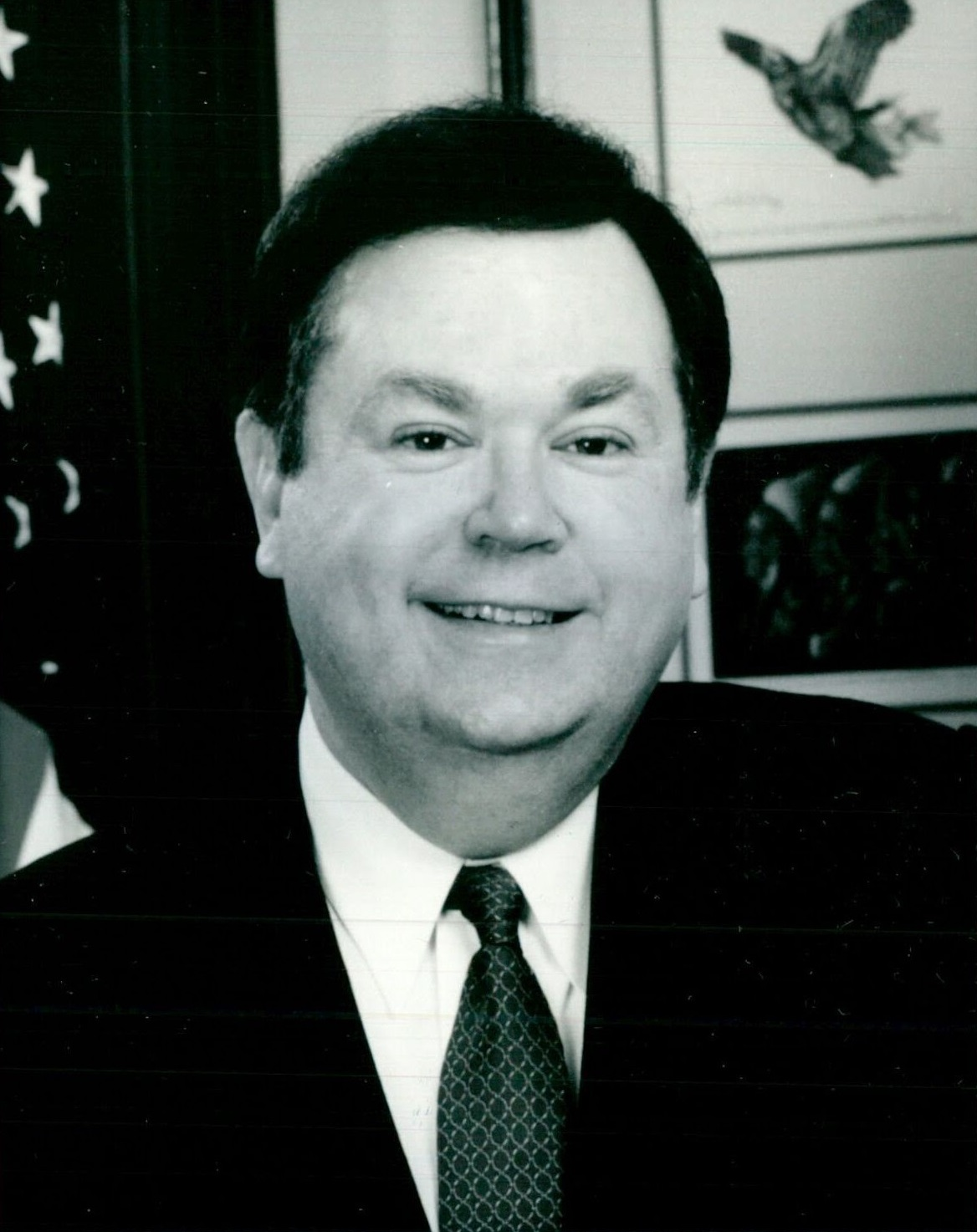

13th President of the University of Oklahoma
- In office December 1, 1994 – June 30, 2018
- Preceded by: Richard L. Van Horn
- Succeeded by: James L. Gallogly

Co-Chair of the President's Intelligence Advisory Board
- In office October 28, 2009 – February 27, 2013 Serving with Chuck Hagel
- President: Barack Obama
- Preceded by: Steve Friedman
- Succeeded by: Shirley Ann Jackson; Jami Miscik

United States Senator from Oklahoma
- In office January 3, 1979 – November 15, 1994
- Preceded by: Dewey F. Bartlett
- Succeeded by: Jim Inhofe
Committee chairmanships
Chair of the Senate Intelligence Committee
In office January 3, 1987 – January 3, 1993
Preceded by	David Durenberger
Succeeded by	Dennis DeConcini

21st Governor of Oklahoma
- In office January 13, 1975 – January 3, 1979
- Lieutenant: George Nigh
- Preceded by: David Hall
- Succeeded by: George Nigh

Member of the Oklahoma House of Representatives from the 28th district
- In office January 1967 – November 1974
- Preceded by: Raymond Reed
- Succeeded by: Jeff Johnston

Personal details
- Born: David Lyle Boren; April 21, 1941 Washington, D.C., U.S.
- Died: February 20, 2025 (aged 83) near Newcastle, Oklahoma, U.S.
- Resting place: Maple Grove Cemetery, Seminole, Oklahoma
- Party: Democratic
- Spouses: Janna Lou Little (m. 1968; div. 1976); Molly Shi (m. 1977)
- Children: 2, including Dan
- Parent: Lyle Boren (father)
- Relatives: Boren family
- Education: Yale University (BA); Balliol College, Oxford (MPhil); University of Oklahoma (JD)

Military service
- Allegiance: United States
- Branch: United States Army
- Service years: 1963–1974
- Rank: Captain
- Unit: Oklahoma Army National Guard
- David Boren's voice Boren introduces Robert Gates at his confirmation hearing to be United States secretary of defense Recorded December 5, 2006

David Lyle Boren (April 21, 1941 – February 20, 2025) was an American lawyer and politician from Oklahoma. A member of the Democratic Party, he served as the 21st governor of Oklahoma from 1975 to 1979 and three terms in the United States Senate from 1979 to 1994. A conservative Democrat, to date, he is the last in his party to have served as U.S. Senator from Oklahoma. He was the 13th and second-longest serving president of the University of Oklahoma from 1994 to 2018. He was the longest serving chairman of the Senate Select Committee on Intelligence. On September 20, 2017, Boren officially announced his retirement as president of the University of Oklahoma, effective June 30, 2018.

== Early life and education ==
Boren was born in Washington, D.C., on April 21, 1941, to Christine (née McKown) and former U.S. representative Lyle Hagler Boren. He attended public schools in Seminole, Oklahoma and Bethesda, Maryland. He later graduated in 1963 from Yale University, where he majored in American history, graduated in the top one percent of his class and was elected to Phi Beta Kappa. He was a member of the Yale Conservative Party, Cannon and Castle ROTC Honor Society, elected president of the Yale Political Union and was a member of Skull and Bones. He was selected as a Rhodes Scholar and earned a master's degree in Philosophy, Politics, and Economics from University of Oxford (1965). In 1968, he received a J.D. degree from the University of Oklahoma College of Law.

== Oklahoma House of Representatives ==
In 1966 Boren defeated fellow Democrat William C. Wantland in a primary election and Clifford Conn Jr. in the general election to win a seat in the Oklahoma House of Representatives. He served four terms, 1967 to 1974.

While serving in the House, Boren was a member of the committee that investigated the University of Oklahoma after the school allowed black militant Paul Boutelle, a socialist and anti-Vietnam War activist, to give a speech there. During his House tenure Boren was also a professor at Oklahoma Baptist University.

Boren served in the Oklahoma Army National Guard from 1963 to 1974. He attained the rank of captain and served as commander of the 2120th Supply & Service Company in Wewoka.

== Governor of Oklahoma ==
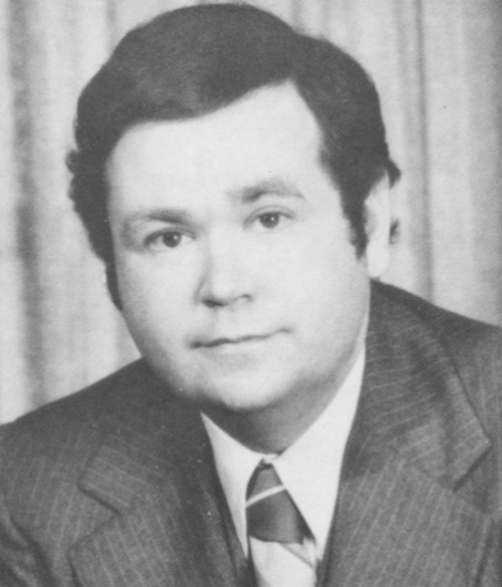
Boren as governor.

In 1974, Boren ran for governor. In keeping with the anti-establishment movements of that Watergate scandal-era campaign season, Boren's effort included the "Boren Broom Brigade" to demonstrate his pledge to "sweep out the Old Guard" and bring fundamental reforms to state government.

Boren and Congressman Clem McSpadden defeated incumbent David Hall in the primary election and moved into a runoff for the Democratic nomination. Boren beat McSpadden in the runoff and subsequently defeated Republican Jim Inhofe in the general election. Inhofe would go on to be his successor in the United States Senate in the 1994 special election after his resignation. He was inaugurated on January 12, 1975. At 33, he was the youngest governor ever inaugurated in Oklahoma.

During his tenure Boren worked on eliminating the inheritance tax for property left by one spouse to another, a reduction in the state income tax rate, improvements to the state corrections program in the wake of the 1973 Oklahoma State Penitentiary riot, and elimination of more than a hundred state agencies, commissions, and boards. Boren attracted national attention during the Energy Crisis when he advocated nationwide deregulation of natural gas prices.

=== 1978 U.S. Senate Campaign ===
Boren opted not to run for reelection in 1978, instead running for the United States Senate seat held by the retiring Dewey Bartlett. He won a multi-candidate primary with 46 percent of the vote to second-place finisher Ed Edmondson's 28 percent. Boren then defeated Edmondson in the runoff, and Republican Robert Kamm, former President of Oklahoma State University, in the general election.

During his 1978 U.S. Senate campaign while holding the office of Governor, Boren faced a crowded Democratic primary with former U.S. representative Ed Edmondson, state senators Gene Stipe and George Miskovsky, Anthony Points, Dean Bridges, and Rosella Pete Saker also running. Boren's main rival for the Democratic party's nomination, Edmondson, called Boren "a Republican" due to his support of eliminating the state inheritance tax between spouses. Edmondson took a pledge recited on a biography of President Harry Truman, that he was not nor had never been "a Republican."

Anthony Points, who ran under an assumed name and faced charges for passing bogus checks, accused Boren of being gay. Following his victory, Boren swore an oath on a family Bible, that "I know what homosexuals and bisexuals are. I further swear that I am not a homosexual or bisexual. And I further swear that I have never been a homosexual or bisexual. And I further swear that I have never engaged in any homosexual or bisexual activities nor do I approve of or condone them."

Despite the personal attacks which made The Washington Post describe the race as a "Gutter Shootout" Boren prevailed by wide margins in the primary, runoff and general election balloting.

== U.S. Senator ==
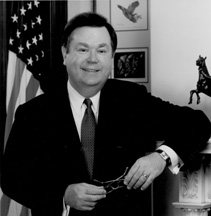
Boren as a senator

In the United States Senate, Boren was known as a centrist or conservative Democrat, was a protégé of Texas Senator Lloyd Bentsen, and was often aligned with southern Democrats Sam Nunn of Georgia and Howell Heflin of Alabama. A strong advocate of tax cuts across the board as the cornerstone of economic policy, Boren opposed the windfall profit tax on the domestic oil industry, which was repealed in 1988. At one point, the tax was generating no revenue, yet still required oil companies to comply with reporting requirements and the IRS to spend $15 million to collect the tax. Of the tax, Boren said: "As long as the tax is not being collected, the accounting requirements are needless. They result in heavy burdens for the private sector and unnecessary cost to the taxpayer." He was reelected in 1984 and 1990 by landslide margins.

Senator Barry Goldwater (R-AZ), who served with him, publicly stated that Boren should be elected president. Boren's chief of staff was a respected Capitol Hill insider, Charles Ward, a former longtime administrative assistant to Speaker of the U.S. House of Representatives (and fellow Oklahoman) Carl Albert.

Boren served on the Senate Committee on Finance and the Committee on Agriculture, Nutrition and Forestry. (Note: During his three terms, he also served on the following committees: Appropriations; Armed Forces; Banking, Housing and Urban Affairs; Budget; Commerce, Science and Transportation; Energy and Natural Resources; Environment and Public Works; Finance; Foreign Relations; Health, Education, Labor and Pensions; Homeland Security and Governmental Affairs; Indian Affairs; Judiciary; Rules and Administration; Small Business and Entrepreneurship; Veterans' Affairs.) He also served as chairman of the Senate Select Committee on Intelligence from 1987 to 1993. His six years is the longest tenure for a Senate Intelligence Committee chairman, tied with Dianne Feinstein. Boren sponsored the National Security Education Act of 1991, which established the National Security Education Program. During the George H. W. Bush administration, he served as an informal emissary to Nicaragua during the time of the Contras insurgency.

Boren was one of only two Democratic senators to vote in favor of the controversial nomination of Robert Bork to the U.S. Supreme Court, in 1987. Boren also decided in 1991 to vote against the Persian Gulf War. Boren was one of President Bill Clinton's top choices to replace Les Aspin as U.S. Secretary of Defense in 1994. However, Clinton selected William J. Perry instead.

In a controversial public mea culpa in a New York Times Op/Ed piece, Boren expressed regret over his vote to confirm Supreme Court Associate Justice Clarence Thomas. Partly as a result of that statement, The Daily Oklahoman, the largest newspaper in Oklahoma, which had encouraged and endorsed Boren's entire career, began intensely criticizing him.

In 1992, he co-sponsored the JFK Records Act. In 1994, he resigned his Senate seat to accept the presidency of the University of Oklahoma.

=== Praise from Nelson Mandela ===
As chairman of the U.S. Senate Select Committee on Intelligence, Boren was instrumental in building consensus and bipartisan support for the U.S. State Department initiatives to promote democracy abroad, which helped lead to the release of Nelson Mandela. Boren was praised and received a standing ovation led by Mandela at a special broadcast of ABC News Nightline with Ted Koppel, which commemorated Mandela's historic release from prison in South Africa. During his first visit to the US after his release, Mandela was a dinner guest of Boren and wife Molly.

== University of Oklahoma presidency ==
Boren served as president of the University of Oklahoma from 1994 until June 30, 2018, and was succeeded by business executive Jim Gallogly. He cut ties with the university in 2019.

He also served on the Board of Directors of Texas Instruments and AMR Corporation (then parent company of American Airlines). In 2017, his salary as president of the University of Oklahoma was $383,852.88 annually. One semester every school year, Boren taught a freshman level political science class.

=== Sigma Alpha Epsilon incident ===
In March 2015, a recording was made public of members of the University of Oklahoma's Sigma Alpha Epsilon fraternity singing a racially derogatory song which used the racial slur nigger and included reference to lynching and racial segregation. As university president, Boren appeared widely in the U.S. media and condemned the behavior, expelled two student members of the fraternity, and with the fraternity's national headquarters' help, ordered the OU chapter's closure. He also created a mandatory Diversity Training for the whole campus. Some legal scholars have argued that these expulsions were improper, as speech, even if offensive, is protected by the First Amendment to the U.S. Constitution. Other scholars have argued that the expulsion was based on the student code of conduct, and what was said is not protected.

=== 2019 misconduct investigation ===
On February 13, 2019, while on sabbatical from health issues, following his 2018 retirement it was reported that the University of Oklahoma had hired the Jones Day law firm to investigate Boren after allegations of his "serious" misconduct arose at the university. The university and specifically the OU Board of Regents declined to specify whether the investigation was actually of Boren, or to specify its start or projected end date, instead referring to it generally as an ongoing personnel investigation. The Oklahoma State Bureau of Investigation conducted a criminal investigation which lasted a year ending with no charges.

During the yearlong investigation which ended with no charges, six witnesses described interactions with Boren, shortly after the end of his 24-year tenure as the institution's president. University of Oklahoma regents received the findings of that Title IX investigation in April 2019, conducted by the law firm Jones Day, and turned it over to the Oklahoma State Bureau of Investigation for the agency's criminal investigation which lasted a year ending with no charges. Only a portion of the Title IX report has been released publicly to accuser and former OU student Jess Eddy, whose allegations were deemed "generally credible" by the law firm though Eddy admitted to "calling Boren personally and asking for financial compensation after The Oklahoman first reported Boren was being investigated." The four-page section released by OU referenced "six witnesses" who discussed interactions with Boren. Boren's successor, James L. Gallogly who ordered investigations of Boren, resigned May 12, 2019 after nine months and two weeks in office.

The investigation purportedly sought to determine whether Boren sexually harassed staff or students during his tenure as president. The allegations arose from a Fall 2010 Boren fundraising trip to Houston in a private jet and hotel events afterward. During the investigation, OU graduate and former Boren classroom aide Jess Eddy made his allegation of Boren's sexual misconduct public through media interviews. Boren issued a blanket denial of any misconduct or illegal activity through his attorney.

Boren's attorney has stated that the investigation is "not an objective search for truth," and an attempted character assassination on Boren without basis in fact, adding that "Boren was unaware of any allegations until he heard about it in the press." Boren's attorney also stated that OU President James L. Gallogly told a Vice President of the University of Oklahoma to deliver the message to Boren that "I am the meanest son of a bitch he has ever seen, and if he ever crosses me again, I will destroy him," after Boren wrote an op-ed defending the state of OU's finances in response to Gallogly's assertion that they were in disorder following Boren's tenure as president.

The University of Oklahoma regents received the results of the investigation in April 2019, and although they did not release any of the findings, the chairwoman described the probe as "fair, non-biased, thorough and objective." Eddy responded to the non-disclosure of the findings by calling for the report by Jones Day to be released.

In October 2020, Acting Oklahoma Attorney General Patrick Henry announced that his office would not seek a Grand Jury criminal indictment against Boren or other parties involved.

== Post-Senate career ==
In 1996, Reform Party presidential candidate Ross Perot unsuccessfully sought Boren to be his vice-presidential running mate. In 2001, Boren, along with fellow Democrat former governor George Nigh was listed as being in support of the Right-to-work law in Oklahoma. The measure, proposed and sponsored by then Gov. Frank Keating, was passed by the voters.

Boren was regarded as a mentor to former director of Central Intelligence George Tenet from his days as chairman of the Senate Intelligence Committee. On the morning of September 11, 2001, Boren and Tenet were having breakfast together when Tenet was called away to respond to the terror attacks.

In June 2007, conservative political columnist Robert Novak claimed that Boren had met with New York City Mayor Michael Bloomberg to discuss a possible third-party presidential campaign. Bloomberg had recently left the Republican Party, and speculation arose that he discussed the possibility of Boren joining him as a running mate. However, on April 18, 2008, Boren endorsed the leading Democratic candidate, Sen. Barack Obama of Illinois.

In 2008, he released a book titled A Letter to America.

Boren and former U.S. senator Chuck Hagel served as co-chairmen of the nonpartisan U.S. President's Intelligence Advisory Board under Barack Obama. He sat on the honorary board of the National Association for Urban Debate Leagues. He was inducted into the Oklahoma Hall of Fame in 1988. In 1996, Boren received the Foreign Language Advocacy Award from the Northeast Conference on the Teaching of Foreign Languages in recognition of his support for education and his authorship of the National Security Education Act of 1992.

== Personal life and death ==
Boren was married twice. His first marriage to Janna Little, daughter of Reuel Little, occurred shortly after his graduation in 1968. They had two children, and divorced in 1976. He married Pontotoc County Special District Judge Molly Shi on November 27, 1977. It was the first time an Oklahoma Governor had married while in office. Shi was a native of Ada, Oklahoma and alumna of East Central University and the University of Oklahoma, where she earned her degree in law. She was a lawyer in private practice for two years before being appointed a judge.

The Boren family has a strong interest in public policy and three generations of public service. His father, Lyle Boren, served in the U.S. House of Representatives (OK-04) from 1937 to 1947. His son, Dan Boren, served in the U.S. House of Representatives (OK-02) from 2005 to 2013.

Boren was the first cousin of singer, songwriter, and actor Hoyt Axton, best known for writing the song "Joy to the World."

In 2017, he underwent heart bypass surgery and he had a minor stroke in 2018. Boren announced intent to retire in 2017, retired in late 2018 and retired from public life but remained Chairman of The Oklahoma Foundation for Excellence, a public education foundation which he started in 1982.

Boren died from diabetes at his home near Newcastle, Oklahoma, on February 20, 2025, at the age of 83. He was buried at Maple Grove Cemetery in Seminole, Oklahoma on February 24, 2025, with a public memorial also being held on March 29, 2025.

== Electoral history ==
1974 Oklahoma gubernatorial Democratic primary results
Party	Candidate	Votes	%
Democratic	Clem McSpadden	238,534	37.6
Democratic	David Boren	225,321	35.5
Democratic	David Hall (incumbent)	169,290	26.7
Total votes		554,440	633,145

1974 Oklahoma gubernatorial Democratic runoff results
Party	Candidate	Votes	%
Democratic	David Boren	286,171	53.5
Democratic	Clem McSpadden	248,623	46.4
Total votes		467,138	100.00

1974 Oklahoma gubernatorial election
Party	Candidate	Votes	%	±%
Democratic	David Boren	514,389	63.9	
Republican	Jim Inhofe	290,459	36.1	
Majority		223,940	28.8	
Turnout		804,848		
Democratic hold		Swing		

1978 Oklahoma U.S. Senate Democratic primary results
Party	Candidate	Votes	%
Democratic	David Boren	252,560	45.84%
Democratic	Ed Edmondson	155,626	28.24%
Democratic	Gene Stipe	114,423	20.77%
Democratic	Dean Bridges	9,883	1.79%
Democratic	George Miskovsky	9,825	1.78%
Democratic	Rosella Pete Saker	5,162	0.94%
Democratic	Anthony Points	3,539	0.64%
Total votes		551,018	100.00%

1978 Oklahoma U.S. Senate Democratic run-off results
Party	Candidate	Votes	%
Democratic	David Boren	281,587	60.46%
Democratic	Ed Edmondson	184,175	39.54%
Total votes		465,762	100.00%

1978 Oklahoma U.S. Senate general election results
Party	Candidate	Votes	%	±%
Democratic	David Boren	493,953	65.49%	▲17.91
Republican	Robert B. Kamm	247,857	32.86%	▼18.57
Independent	Glenn E. Hager	3,875	0.51%	N/A
Independent politician	D. Riley Donica	3,355	0.45%	N/A
Independent politician	Paul E. Trent	3,015	0.40%	N/A
Independent politician	Richard K. Carter	2,209	0.29%	N/A
Total votes		754,264	100%	
Democratic gain from Republican		Swing		

1984 Democratic U.S. Senate primary
Party	Candidate	Votes	%
Democratic	David Boren (incumbent)	432,534	89.87%
Democratic	Marshall A. Luse	48,761	10.13%
Total votes		481,295	100.00%

1984 Oklahoma U.S. Senate general election results
Party	Candidate	Votes	%	±%
Democratic	David Boren (incumbent)	906,131	75.64%	▲10.15
Republican	Will Crozier	280,638	23.43%	▼9.43
Libertarian	Robert T. Murphy	11,168	0.93%	▲0.93
Total votes		1,197,937	100.00%	
Democratic hold				

1990 Oklahoma U.S. Senate Democratic primary results
Party	Candidate	Votes	%
Democratic	David Boren (incumbent)	445,969	84.3%
Democratic	Virginia Jenner	57,909	10.9%
Democratic	Manuel Ybarra	25,169	4.8%
Total votes		529,047	100.00%

1990 United States Senate election in Oklahoma
Party	Candidate	Votes	%
Democratic	David Boren (Incumbent)	735,684	83.18%
Republican	Stephen Jones	148,814	16.82%
Majority		586,870	66.35%
Total votes		884,498	100.00%
Democratic hold			

== See also ==
- Boren–McCurdy proposals
- List of American Academy of Arts and Sciences members (2006–2019)
- List of former United States senators
- List of governors of Oklahoma
- List of people from Norman, Oklahoma
- List of Phi Mu Alpha Sinfonia members
- List of presidents of the University of Oklahoma
- List of the youngest state legislators in the United States
- List of United States senators from Oklahoma
- List of Yale University people

== Notes ==
Party political offices
Preceded by David Hall	Democratic nominee for Governor of Oklahoma; 1974	Succeeded by George Nigh
Preceded by Ed Edmondson	Democratic nominee for U.S. Senator from Oklahoma (Class 2); 1978, 1984, 1990	Succeeded by Dave McCurdy
Preceded by Les AuCoin, Joe Biden, Bill Bradley, Robert Byrd, Tom Daschle, Bill Hefner, Barbara B. Kennelly, George Miller, Tip O'Neill, Paul Tsongas, Tim Wirth	Response to the State of the Union address 1984; Served alongside: Max Baucus, Joe Biden, Barbara Boxer, Robert Byrd, Dante Fascell, Bill Gray, Tom Harkin, Dee Huddleston, Carl Levin, Tip O'Neill, Claiborne Pell	Succeeded by Bill Clinton; Bob Graham; Tip O'Neill
Political offices
Preceded by David Hall	Governor of Oklahoma; 1975–1979	Succeeded by George Nigh
U.S. Senate
Preceded by Dewey Bartlett	U.S. Senator (Class 2) from Oklahoma; 1979–1994; Served alongside: Henry Bellmon, Don Nickles	Succeeded by Jim Inhofe
Preceded by David Durenberger	Chair of the Senate Intelligence Committee; 1987–1993	Succeeded by Dennis DeConcini
New office	Chair of the Joint Reorganization Committee; 1992–1994; Served alongside: Lee Hamilton	Position abolished
Academic offices
Preceded by Richard L. Van Horn	President of the University of Oklahoma; 1994–2018	Succeeded by James L. Gallogly
Government offices
Preceded by Steve Friedman	Chair of the President's Intelligence Advisory Board; 2009–2013; Served alongside: Chuck Hagel	Vacant Title next held by Shirley Ann Jackson; Jami Miscik
