= Jeremiah E. Burke =

American educator

9th Superintendent of Boston Public Schools
- In office October 31, 1921 – October 29, 1931
- Preceded by: Frank V. Thompson
- Succeeded by: Patrick T. Campbell

Superintendent of Lawrence Public Schools
- In office 1895–1904
- Preceded by: William C. Bates
- Succeeded by: Bernard M. Sheridan

Personal details
- Born: June 25, 1867 Frankfort, Maine, U.S.
- Died: October 29, 1931 (aged 64) Dorchester, Boston, Massachusetts, U.S.
- Children: 2
- Parent(s): Patrick Burke; Mary (Hughes) Burke
- Profession: Educator

Jeremiah E. Burke (June 25, 1867 – October 29, 1931) was an American educator who served as superintendent of schools in Boston and Lawrence, Massachusetts.

== Early life ==
Burke was born on June 25, 1867, in Frankfort, Maine, to Patrick and Mary (Hughes) Burke. He attended Frankfort public schools and graduated from the East Maine Conference Seminary in 1886 and Colby College in 1890.

== Career ==
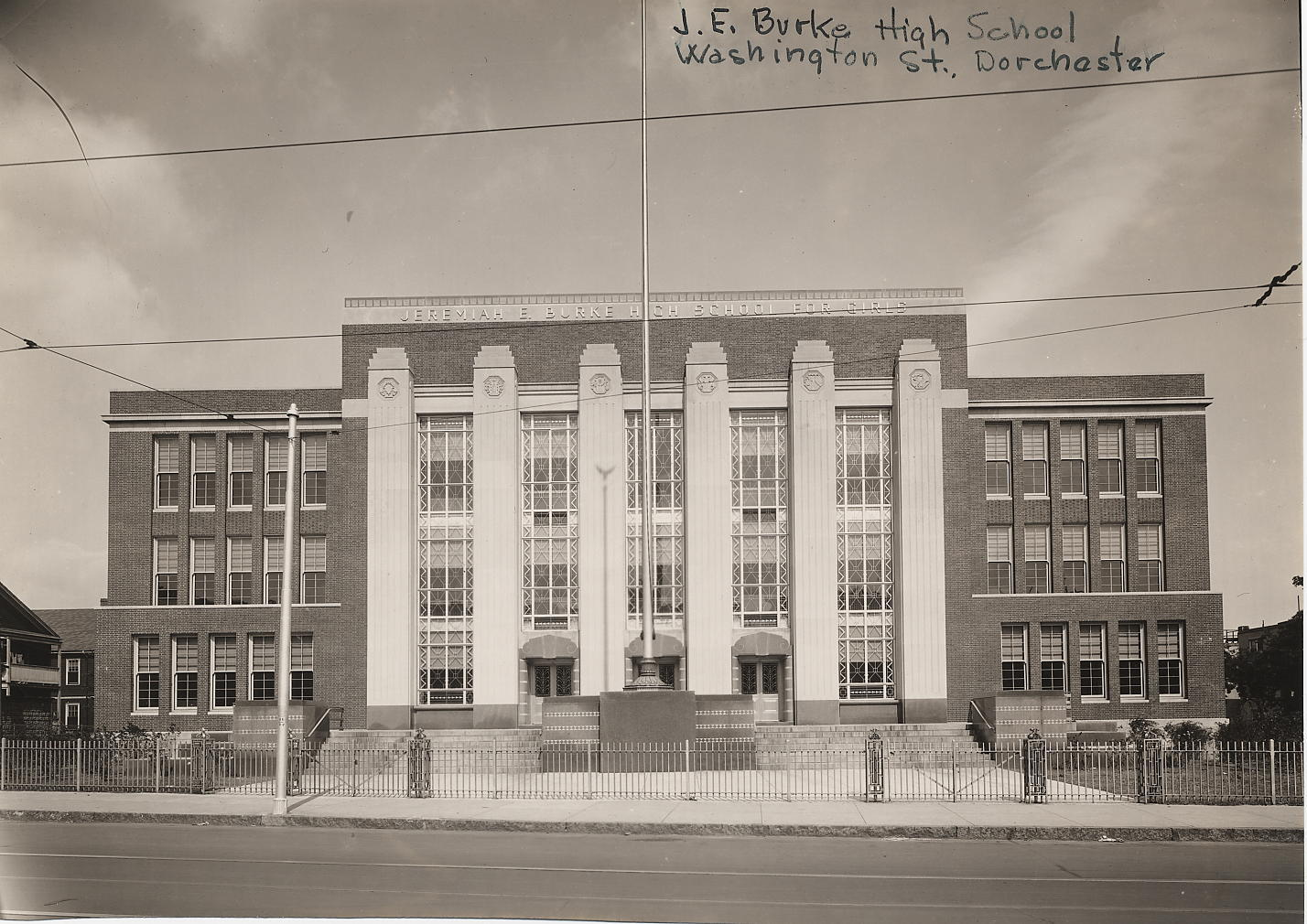
Jeremiah E. Burke High School

From 1891 to 1893, Burke was superintendent of schools in Waterville, Maine. He spent a year as superintendent in Marlborough, Massachusetts, before moving to the same position in Lawrence, where he oversaw a school system of over 9,000 pupils and 250 teachers. He pushed for the creation of Lawrence's Evening High School and oversaw the city's Normal and Training School for Teachers until it was made a part of the Lowell State Normal School in 1903.

In 1904, Burke was appointed to the board of supervisors of Boston Public Schools. In 1906, a regulation change resulted in Burke's title being changed from supervisor to assistant superintendent, although his duties remained the same. Following George H. Conley's death in 1905, Burke was considered for the position of superintendent, but Stratton D. Brooks was chosen instead. From 1914 to 1917 he was a member of the Massachusetts Board of Education. In 1917 he and Frank Ballou argued for the creation of junior high schools in Boston. In 1918, superintendent Franklin B. Dyer retired and the school committee deadlocked on the choice of his successor, with three of the assistant superintendents - Burke, Frank V. Thompson, and Augustine L. Rafter, receiving votes from the committee members. The stalemate lasted two months and was broken when one of Rafter's supporters agreed to break the deadlock by voting for Thompson.

On October 23, 1921, Thompson died suddenly at his home in Brighton. On October 31, Burke was made acting superintendent. A week later the school committee voted to appoint him for the rest of Thompson's term. He was appointed to a full six-year term in 1924 and reappointed in 1930. On October 29, 1931, Burke died in his sleep at his home in Dorchester. He was survived by his wife, a son, and a daughter. He was buried in St. Joseph Cemetery. In 1934 the city's new girl's high school was named after Burke, since renamed for its former principal Al Holland.

Educational offices
Preceded by William C. Bates	Superintendent of Lawrence Public Schools; 1895–1904	Succeeded by Bernard M. Sheridan
Preceded by Frank V. Thompson	Superintendent of Boston Public Schools; 1921–1931	Succeeded by Patrick T. Campbell
