= James S. Buchanan =

American university president (1864–1930)

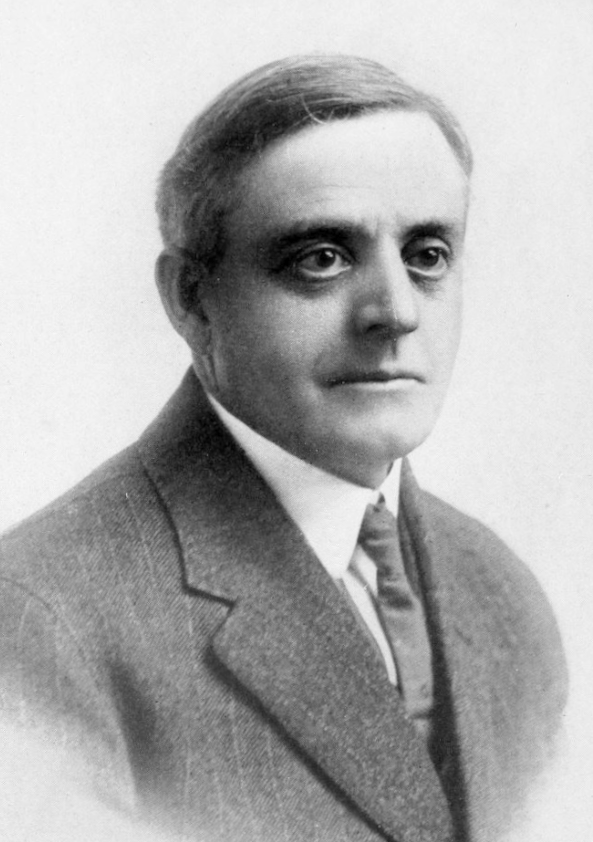

4th President of the University of Oklahoma
- In office 1924–1925
- Preceded by: Stratton D. Brooks
- Succeeded by: William Bizzell

Personal details
- Born: October 14, 1864 Franklin, Tennessee
- Died: March 20, 1930 (aged 65) Norman, Oklahoma
- Party: Democratic
- Relatives: John P. Buchanan (brother); Major John Buchanan (great-grandfather); James M. Buchanan (great-nephew); Gordon Anderson (third great-nephew)
- Education: Cumberland University; Vanderbilt University; University of Chicago; Kingfisher College LL.D
- Profession: Historian, educator, university administrator
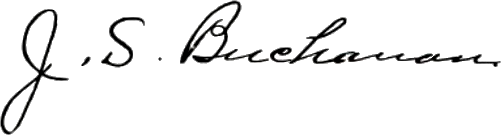
- Signature

James Shannon Buchanan (October 14, 1864 – March 20, 1930), the fourth president of the University of Oklahoma, was born October 14, 1864, to Thomas and Rebecca Jane Shannon in Franklin, Tennessee. His grandfather, Major John Buchanan, was one of the founders of Nashville, Tennessee. His brother, John P. Buchanan was a governor of Tennessee. He attended public school and the academy at Murfreesboro, Tennessee. Then he attended and graduated from Cumberland University at Lebanon, Tennessee in 1885 with a Bachelor of Science degree. He did graduate work at both Vanderbilt University in 1893-4 and the University of Chicago in 1896. He received his LL.D. from Kingfisher College, Kingfisher, Oklahoma in 1917.

Buchanan was one of the earliest faculty members appointed to the newly created Oklahoma University by its first president, David Ross Boyd, and began advancing through the academic ranks. He became chairman of the History Department, then Dean of the College of Arts and Sciences, where he served for 19 years. Described as extremely popular with both students and faculty, he proved to be a very effective administrator. He also survived political purges that swept away two presidents and several other highly rated faculty members during the early years of the University's existence. After serving nearly one year as acting president and one as full president, he returned to full-time teaching and serving as the school vice president until his death in March 1930.

== Move to Oklahoma ==
James' brother, John, was the Governor of Tennessee during 1891 - 1893. He appointed James as the assistant superintendent of public schools for the state. Instead, James decided to move to Indian Territory, where he became a professor of history at Central Normal School in Edmond in 1894. (Note: The Oklahoma Territorial Legislature had established the Territorial Normal School on December 24, 1890. Thus, it is the oldest school of higher education in the state. The name was changed a half dozen times before becoming University of Central Oklahoma in 1991.) In 1895, Buchanan moved to Norman and accepted the same position at the newer University of Oklahoma, a connection he would maintain for the rest of his career. (Note: According to Harp, Buchanan was actually hired to teach both American History and English. He was relieved of the English class when Vernon L. Parrington was hired in 1897, but Buchanan was tasked to continue developing an Economics department.)

== Politics and academia ==
Around the dawn of the Twentieth Century, territorial colleges and universities were ripe fields for political patronage. There had been only one Democratic Governor in Oklahoma Territory since it was created in 1890, W. C. Renfrow was appointed by Democratic President Grover Cleveland and served between 1893 and 1897. David Ross Boyd, the first President of OU, had been appointed by the first Oklahoma Territorial Governor, George W. Steele, a Republican, who had been appointed by Republican President Benjamin Harrison. At the first statewide election after being granted statehood on November 16, 1907, the electorate chose an administration controlled by the Democratic Party, led by Charles N. Haskell. Among other "reforms", the Democrats were determined to purge Republican influence from OU. Very soon, Haskell fired the entire OU Board of Regents and named a new president for the school, Arthur Grant Evans, who was to take over, effective July 1, 1908. Evans had previously been president of Henry Kendall College, then a Presbyterian School located in Muskogee.

== "Uncle Buck" survives ==
Every faculty member was directed to appear before the Board of Regents on June 23, 1908, to present reasons why they should be allowed to remain at OU. For most, this was a formality, as the outcome had already been decided before the meeting, based on party affiliation. Fortunately for them, most were hired outside the state before the start of the next school year.

Buchanan was one of two southern Democrats on the faculty prior to Oklahoma becoming a state. (Note: Whether Buchanan was personally Republican or Democrat was irrelevant in the eyes of the patronage system. Even though he was hired by Boyd, a Republican, the appointment was made during the term of Democrat Renfrow, so Buchanan was considered a Democrat by the Haskell Administration.) Because of this, he was one of the few who survived the cuts the newly elected Democratic governor of Oklahoma, Charles N. Haskell, made to the University; cuts which included the first president of Oklahoma, David Ross Boyd. He came to the university in 1895 as a professor of history. Buchanan had other advantages as well. He was politically active, having been a member of the Oklahoma Constitutional Convention in 1906-7. He was also elected to the Norman City Council. He had a great talent for making friends all over the state. He was extremely popular among his students, who had coined the nickname, "Uncle Buck", for him, and by which he was known all over the campus. Another faculty member said,"... everybody liked Professor Buchanan. I presume he never had an enemy." Through the years, he progressed up the ranks. Soon, he was head of the department of history. In 1909, he was named as the first dean of the College of Arts and Sciences.

He also was a busy man outside of his university duties: he was an official in his church, the superintendent of his Sunday school, member of a civic club, member of the chamber of commerce, and of a prominent fraternal organization.

== University president ==
In 1922, John C. "Jack" Walton, a Democrat, was elected Governor of Oklahoma. Walton had a very different agenda for the university. He represented a solidly populist wing of the electorate who felt that the institution had become too elitist, too expensive, and whose curriculum taught too many social concepts that they opposed. Almost as soon as he took office, he began a campaign to eliminate these problems. First he fired five members of the Board of Regents and replaced them with his own backers. Then he began to undermine President Stratton Duluth Brooks, who had been hired in 1912. By 1923, Brooks decided that he did not want to remain in a position where he clearly was unwanted, and resigned from OU on January 12, 1923. (Note: The University of Missouri had previously contacted Brooks about becoming president of that school. Now that circumstances had changed, a deal was soon made, and Brooks left for UM.)

Evidently realizing that it would not be possible to hire a highly qualified president before classes began in the fall of 1923, Walton appointed Professor James S. Buchanan as Acting President. Buchanan was dean of the college of arts and sciences for 14 years before he was named acting president of the university on July 1, 1923. He was appointed president one year later. He was not in office very long but he still had several notable accomplishments. For one he was responsible for the reestablishment of the Oklahoma Geological Survey. Also, the concept and fundraising began for a combination football stadium/student union began during his year as president.

In 1925, Buchanan led a $1 million fund-raising campaign to build both a football stadium and a student union building. Construction began in the same year, and the student union building was completed and opened November 22, 1928. Both the Oklahoma Memorial Union and Memorial Stadium, were dedicated in honor of the OU students and alumni who died in World War I. Later, it was rededicated to honor all members of the OU community who sacrificed their lives in defense of their country. A clock tower was included in the original, but was not added until 1936 because of the onset of the Great Depression. (Note: The tower was added as a Works Progress Administration (WPA) project.) He served effectively, but made known that he strongly desired to return to teaching. After he was replaced as university president by William Bennett Bizzell in June 1925, he remained at OU serving as the Vice-President of the university.

== Personal ==
James married Vinnie Galbraith at Terrell, Texas on June 24, 1896. They had three children: Frances, James and William, before Vinnie died May 15, 1921. On December 23, 1924, he married his second wife, Katharyn Osterhaus, who had been the supervisor of English at University High School also in Norman, Oklahoma. James Shannon Buchanan died on March 20, 1930. Katharyn and the three children survived him.

He was a great-grandson of Major John Buchanan, an early Middle Tennessee settler and the founder of Buchanan's Station; a great-uncle of Nobel Prize winning economist James M. Buchanan; and a third great-uncle of Gordon Anderson, widower of actress Sondra Locke.

== See also ==
- University of Central Oklahoma

== Notes ==
Preceded by Stratton D. Brooks	President of the University of Oklahoma; 1924–1925	Succeeded by William Bennett Bizzell
