= Gordon Anderson (sculptor) =

American sculptor (born 1944)

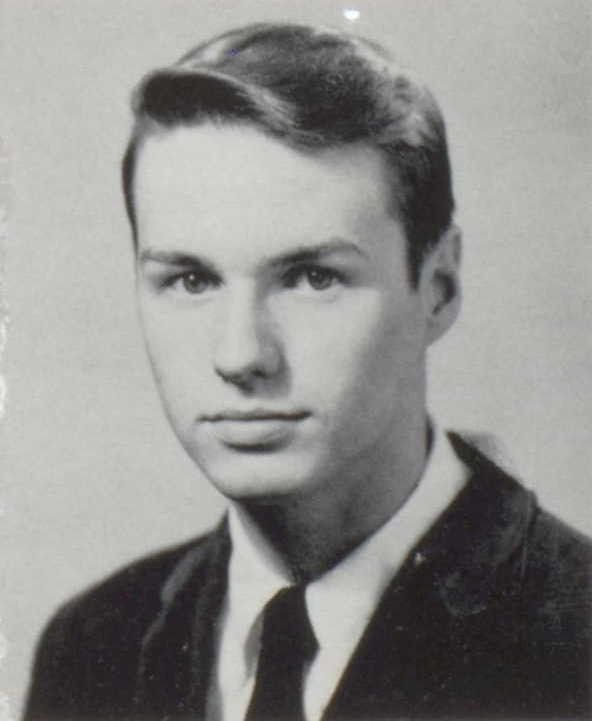
- Anderson in 1961
- Born: Gordon Leigh Anderson; August 2, 1944 (age 82); Morrilton, Arkansas, U.S.
- Other name: Gordon Addison
- Occupations: Sculptor; fashion designer; actor
- Years active: 1962–1986
- Spouse: Sondra Locke (m. 1967; died 2018)
- Relatives: Major John Buchanan (fourth great-grandfather); Sally Buchanan (fourth great-grandmother); John P. Buchanan (third great-uncle); James S. Buchanan (third great-uncle); James M. Buchanan (fourth cousin once removed)

Gordon Leigh Anderson (born August 2, 1944) is an American retired sculptor, actor and fashion designer. He is the widower of actress Sondra Locke, to whom he was married for 51 years.

== Early life ==
Gordon Leigh Anderson was born on August 2, 1944, in Morrilton, Arkansas, the younger of Margaret Helen Leigh and William Basil Anderson's two sons. (Note: Owing to subterfuge disseminated by his late wife, countless books and articles have erroneously pegged Anderson's age to a later birthdate.) He is a fourth great-grandson of Major John Buchanan, an early Middle Tennessee settler and the founder of Buchanan's Station on Mill Creek. Former Tennessee governor John P. Buchanan and University of Oklahoma president James S. Buchanan were his third great-uncles, and economist James M. Buchanan was his fourth cousin once removed.

At the time of Anderson's birth, his father was a corporal in the United States Army and was stationed at Camp Livingston, Louisiana. The family resided in Jonesboro, Arkansas, from 1946 to 1952. They subsequently moved to Bedford County, Tennessee, where Anderson graduated from Shelbyville Central High School in 1962.

Anderson attended Middle Tennessee State University and George Peabody College for Teachers but did not graduate from either. He also took a summer course at the Pasadena Playhouse in California and studied acting at the American Academy of Dramatic Arts in New York City, eventually signing with the General Artists Corporation.

== Career ==
Early in his career, he was billed under the stage name of Gordon Addison because there was another Gordon Anderson in the Actors’ Equity Association.

Anderson made his off-Broadway debut in the Martinique Theatre production of Until the Monkey Comes in 1966, garnering a New York Drama Critics' Circle Award for Best Actor and receiving a Theatre World Award nomination. The play ran for 76 performances. This was followed by a year and a half of professional inactivity while Anderson managed the career of his movie star wife, Sondra Locke. The couple appeared together on television programs including To Tell the Truth and The Dick Cavett Show.

Anderson designed the $7,000 aqua sequined gown his wife wore to the 41st Academy Awards when she was nominated for The Heart Is a Lonely Hunter (1968). It received national attention in several fashion magazines, after which he was called upon to design dresses for Jane Fonda and Candice Bergen.

In 1969, it was announced that Anderson would co-star with his wife in a screen adaptation of Until the Monkey Comes with Robert Sickinger slated to direct, but no movie resulted.

By the early 1970s, Anderson devoted full time to sculpture and was in demand by private collectors. Decades later, one of his creations, a miniature set of characters from Alice in Wonderland, was acquired by Demi Moore.

Anderson had voiceover roles in two of his wife's films, A Reflection of Fear (1972) and Ratboy (1986), voicing the titular character in the latter. According to his wife's autobiography, Clint Eastwood offered Anderson the role of Leonard James in Bronco Billy (1980), but at that point he had no interest in appearing in front of the camera. (Note: He is a former de facto co-husband of Eastwood, with whom his late wife resided for 14 years.) Sam Bottoms, a substantially younger actor, was cast instead.

Anderson used Eastwood's contacts in France to gain rare access to a guillotine, which he then manufactured replicas of.

Caritas Films, the production company Anderson and his wife formed following her disassociation from Eastwood, shut down in 2004 after failing to get any projects off the ground.

== Marriage to Locke ==
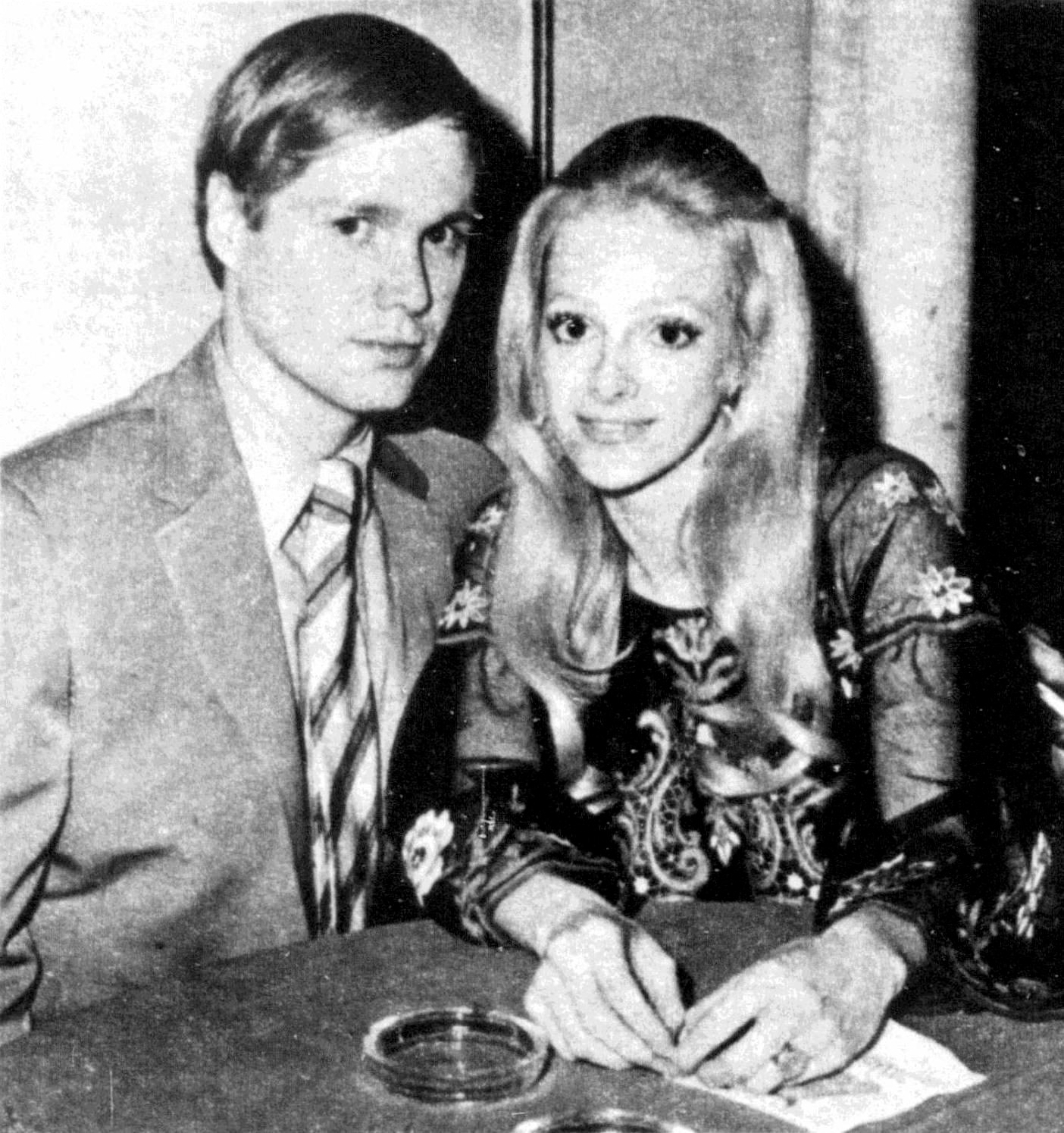
Anderson and his wife, 1968

Anderson married Sondra Locke on September 25, 1967, at the First Presbyterian Church in Nashville, Tennessee, in what has been described as a marriage of convenience. There was no honeymoon for the newlyweds due to Locke's ongoing filming commitments for The Heart Is a Lonely Hunter. Anderson and Locke never had children, with Locke declaring in a 1969 interview that she didn't want any. They had an open marriage and both spouses engaged in long-term extramarital relationships. In 1989, Locke stated that their marriage had never been consummated, and in 1996, she confirmed that Anderson was gay. The pair remained married until Locke's death on November 3, 2018. Locke left an estate worth $20 million (equivalent to $25.6 million in 2025), which Anderson inherited.

== Filmography ==
Year	Title	Role	Notes	Ref(s)
1972	A Reflection of Fear	Aaron	Voice	
1986	Ratboy	Ratboy	Voice	

== Selected stage credits ==
Year	Show	Role	Venue	Notes	Ref(s)
1962	The Monkey's Paw	Mr. White	Bud Frank Theatre, Johnson City, Tennessee		
1962	Life with Father	Whitney Day	Tucker Theater, Murfreesboro, Tennessee		
1963	The Boy Friend	Percival Browne	Shelbyville Players, Shelbyville, Tennessee		
1964	Life with Mother	Clarence Day Jr.	Belcourt Playhouse, Nashville, Tennessee		
1964	The Innocents	Miles	Circle Theater, Nashville, Tennessee		
1966	Until the Monkey Comes	Philip Armitage	Martinique Theatre, New York, New York	Billed as Gordon Addison	

== See also ==
- Mixed-orientation marriage
