= Frank V. Thompson =

8th Superintendent of Boston Public Schools
- In office 1918 – October 23, 1921
- Preceded by: Franklin B. Dyer
- Succeeded by: Jeremiah E. Burke

Personal details
- Born: Frank Victor Thompson; July 28, 1874 Batesville, Arkansas, U.S.
- Died: October 23, 1921 (aged 47) Brighton, Boston, Massachusetts, U.S.
- Cause of death: Peritonitis
- Children: 3
- Education: Saint Anselm College; Harvard Summer School; Massachusetts Institute of Technology; Martha's Vineyard Summer Institute
- Profession: Educator

Frank Victor Thompson (July 28, 1874 – October 23, 1921) was an American educator who served as superintendent of Boston Public Schools from 1918 to 1921.

== Early life ==
Thompson was born on July 28, 1874, in a United States Army camp in Batesville, Arkansas. His parents were from New Hampshire and he grew up in New England. He was educated in Portland, Maine and Manchester, New Hampshire. He graduated from Saint Anselm College in 1896 and was the valedictorian of his class. He also studied at the Harvard Summer School, Teachers' School of Science at the Massachusetts Institute of Technology, Martha's Vineyard Summer Institute, and the Pedagogical Seminary of Harvard Graduate School.

== Career ==
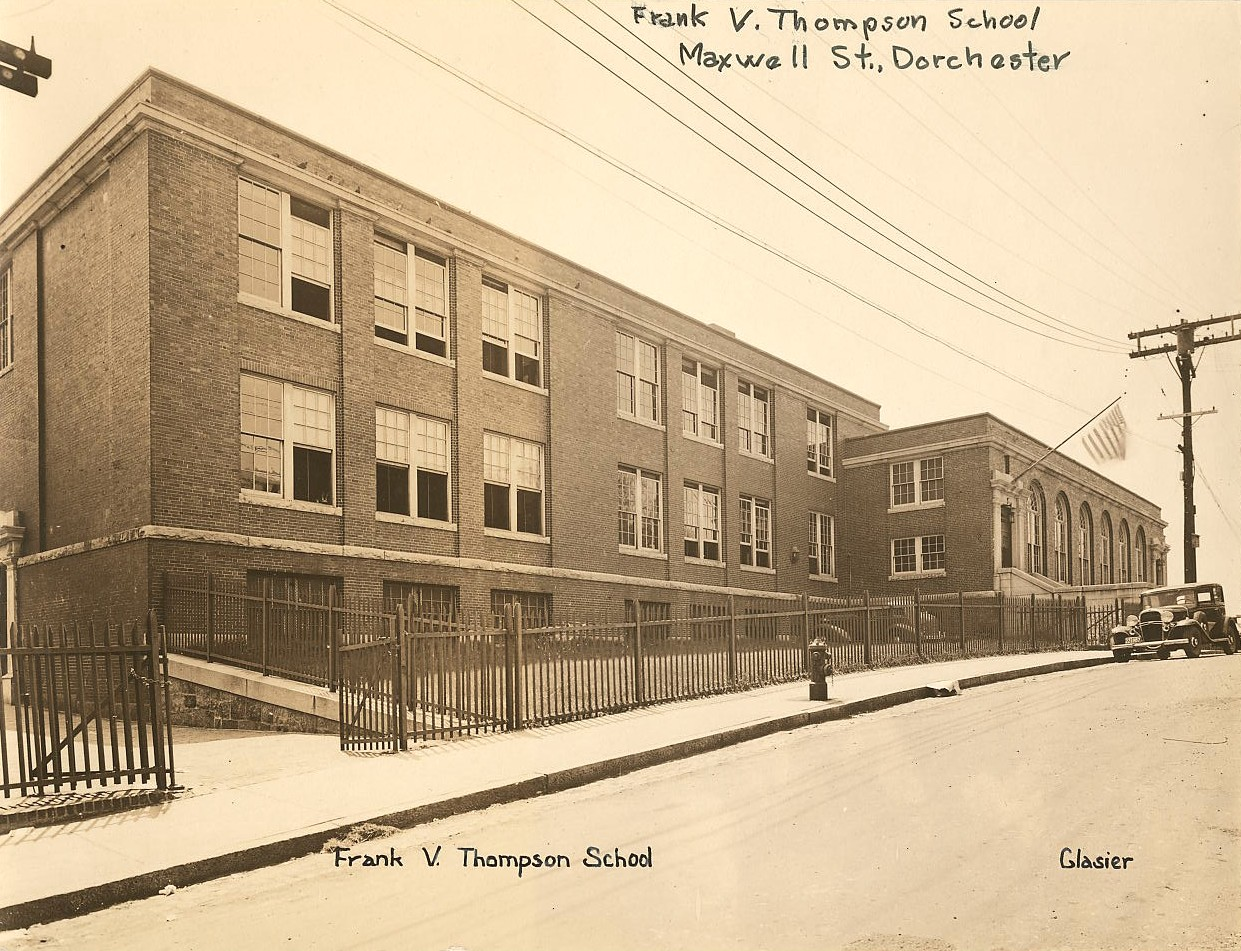
Frank V. Thompson School

From 1895 to 1897, Thompson was principal of the North Walpole grammar school. He then taught mathematics at Lawrence High School. From 1898 to 1901 he was headmaster of the Wetherbee School in Lawrence, Massachusetts.

Thompson moved to the Boston Public Schools in 1901 as the submaster of the Chapman School in East Boston. He then served as junior master of the South Boston High School from 1901 to 1906. He also served as an instructor of commercial subjects in the Central Evening High School from 1901 to 1903, principal of the South Boston Educational Center from 1902 to 1905, and principal of the Bigelow Evening School from 1905 to 1906. In 1906 he was sent to Europe to study the educational systems used in Italy, Switzerland, Austria, Germany, Belgium, and France. His report resulted in the creation of the High School of Commerce and he was made the school's first headmaster. In 1910 he was appointed assistant superintendent of schools. He was influential in starting the Continuation School, which allowed boys who were in the workforce to get a part-time education in their field of employment. In 1914, Thompson was offered the position of secretary of the National Commission of Vocational Education, a committee appointed by President Woodrow Wilson that was to create a national policy for appropriating funds for industrial education, but the Boston School Committee chose not to grant him a leave of absence.

In 1918, superintendent Franklin B. Dyer retired and the school committee deadlocked on the choice of his successor, with three of the assistant superintendents - Thompson, Jeremiah E. Burke, and Augustine L. Rafter, receiving votes from the committee members. The stalemate lasted two months and was broken when one of Rafter's supporters agreed to break the deadlock by voting for Thompson. On October 23, 1921, Thompson died suddenly at his home in Brighton. His death was attributed to peritonitis brought on by ptomaine poisoning from spoiled venison. He was survived by his wife and three daughters. The Frank V. Thompson Junior High School in Dorchester was named after him.

Educational offices
| Preceded by Franklin B. Dyer | Superintendent of Boston Public Schools; 1918–1921 | Succeeded by Jeremiah E. Burke |
