= Stratton D. Brooks =

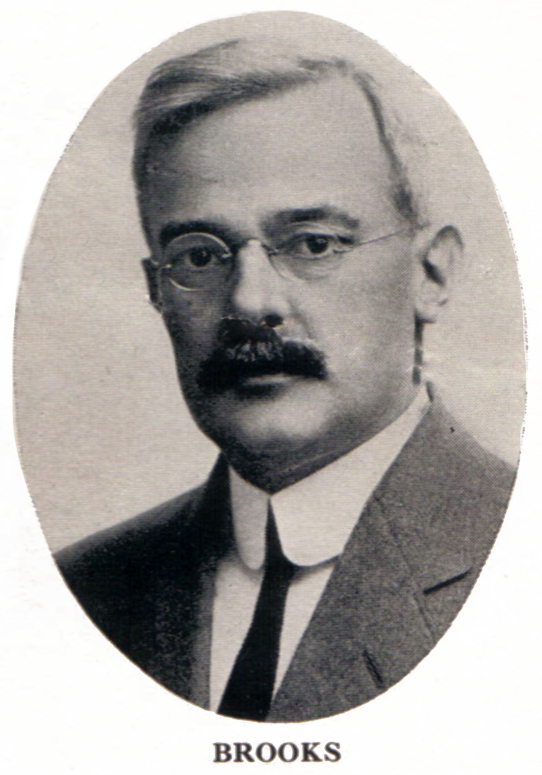
- Brooks as he appeared in the 1915 Sooner Yearbook

3rd President of the University of Oklahoma
- In office 1912–1923
- Preceded by: A. Grant Evans
- Succeeded by: James S. Buchanan

11th President of the University of Missouri
- In office 1923–1930
- Preceded by: John Carleton Jones
- Succeeded by: Walter Williams

Personal details
- Born: September 10, 1869 Everett, Missouri
- Died: January 18, 1949 (aged 79)
- Education: Michigan State Normal College; University of Michigan; Harvard University
- Profession: Educator, Professor, School administration

Stratton Duluth Brooks (September 10, 1869 – January 18, 1949) was the third president of the University of Oklahoma and eleventh president of the University of Missouri.

== Early life ==
Brooks was born on September 10, 1869, in Everett, Missouri, to Charles Myers and Marion (McClure) Brooks. At the age of two, he and his parents moved to Michigan where his father was a Sheriff in Isabella County, Michigan, from 1878 to 1882. Stratton Brooks graduated from Mt. Pleasant High School in 1887, the Michigan State Normal College in 1890, and the University of Michigan in 1896.

== Early career ==
After graduating from Michigan, Brooks began his teaching career as principal of Adrian High School. He later served as vice president of the Mt. Pleasant Normal School and organized and was the first superintendent of LaSalle-Peru High School. In 1899 he became an assistant professor of education at the University of Illinois. He also served as a state inspector of high schools. In 1902 he moved to Boston, where he served as a supervisor of the Boston Public Schools. In 1903 he married Marcia Stuart of Port Hope, Michigan. In 1904 he earned a Master of Arts degree from Harvard University. On January 1, 1906, he became superintendent of the Cleveland Municipal School District. Two months later, Brooks returned to Boston to become superintendent of Boston Public Schools.

== University of Oklahoma ==
When Brooks was first being courted for the position of OU president in 1911, he at first did not want the position. It was seen as a fledgling university and many on the East Coast were "still in shock" at the summary discharge of former president David Ross Boyd. He wasn't approached again until 1912 while at a national superintendent's meetings in St. Louis, Missouri. He was approached by William A. Brandenberg who was a member of the new Oklahoma State Board of Education. Again, Brooks refused the job but Brandenberg continued to pursue telling him that the Board desired to keep politics out of the selection process. Brooks still refused but gave advice on how to keep politics out of the process by saying that only the university president could appoint faculty and that the Board should have nothing to do with the administration of the university. Eventually, the Board agreed to these guidelines and was able to convince Brooks to accept the position. Brooks later said that, "Whatever was accomplished during my eleven years as president of the University, was possible only because the Board of Education that appointed me, and its successors, never violated the basic principles set forth in that first conference."

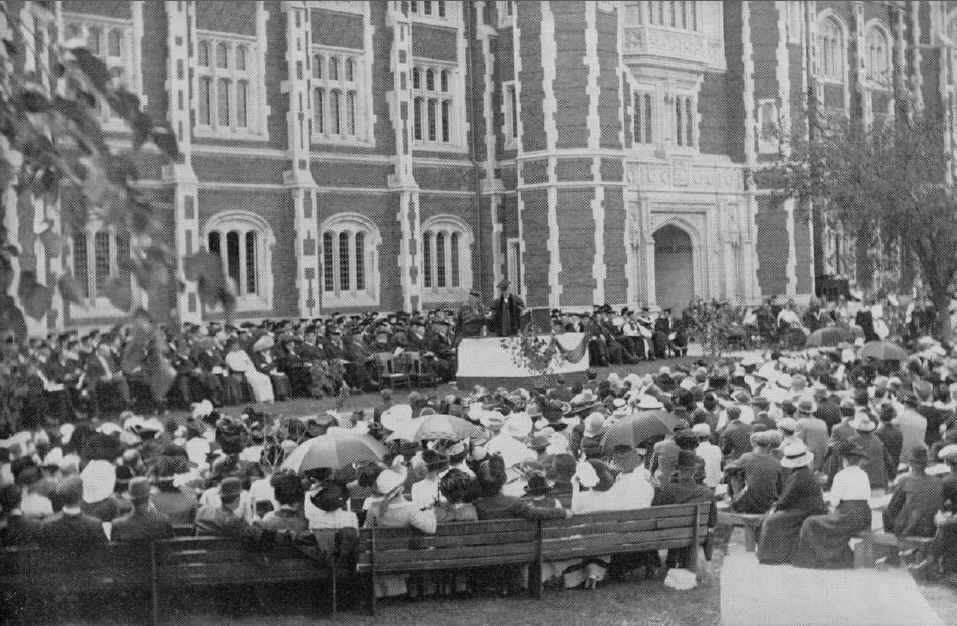
President Brook's inauguration in 1912 in front of Evans Hall.

Brooks was inaugurated as president of the university in the spring of 1912. He immediately set to rebuilding the university. He found that many of Oklahoma's own citizens (over 1,500) were sending their children to out of state colleges. He immediately went about strengthening the faculty but he did not fire one individual brought in because of political connections if he was a good teacher. At the university, Brooks established a permanent faculty salary, sabbatical leave, and permanent tenure. He also acquired land around the university where the stadium and armory now stand. Brooks had a great reputation with the Board of Education (now the Board of Regents) and the Oklahoma legislature. During his years as president, many building were constructed around campus.

=== Accomplishments during WWI ===
Brooks' was also OU's first wartime president, have served during the duration of World War I. He made many efforts to see that the university was at the forefront of preparedness for all war needs. He imposed strict food regulations on the university and he established thirteen courses in seven different departments for the direct purpose of "training soldiers, training men who expect to become soldiers, and training people who take the place of soldiers in civil life." Some of these courses included: wire telegraphy, wireless telegraphy, stenography and shorthand, oxyacetylene welding, orthopedic surgery, military field engineering, and first aid courses. Students under 21 were required to take special courses in the Student Army Training Corps. Barracks, an infirmary, bathhouse, guardhouse, and canteen were constructed. By the latter part of 1918, the university was practically a military base. All in all, 30 faculty members, 500 alumni, and 1,875 students were in military service during the war.

=== End of the line at OU ===
Brooks' situation changed dramatically after John C. ("Jack") Walton was elected Governor of Oklahoma in 1922. Gone was the close working relationship he had with previous governors. Walton felt that Brooks was not enthusiastic about promoting the new governor's political agenda. Some of Walton's political advisors felt that the university was a hotbed of anti-Walton supporters. Edwin DeBarr, the OU vice president, had openly supported Walton's rival in the primary. After both Brooks and the Board of Regents had written letters to the members of OU's faculty, cautioning them against taking part in the upcoming election campaign, DeBarr continued to take an active political role, making fiery speeches supporting Walton's rival for the governorship, Robert H. Wilson, the state superintendent of education. (Note: According to Professor Levy's history of the University of Oklahoma, Walton was vigorously opposed to the growing political power of the Ku Klux Klan, while both DeBarr and Wilson were active members of the KKK., pp. 65-66.)

Walton, the Democratic nominee easily defeated Wilson, the Republican, in the general election of November, 1922, and was inaugurated in January, 1923. In May 1923, he abruptly dismissed four of the five existing regents from the board and replaced them with reliable supporters of himself and his agenda. The board quickly proceeded to terminate DeBarr's employment. (Note: DeBarr's was removed from his tenured professorship, his office as vice president was abolished, and he was put on permanent leave of absence without pay, effective July 1, 1923. Levy says that "everyone understood that DeBarr was not to return to the University after his 'unpaid leave of absence.'", pp. 70-71.)

Walton then retaliated against Brooks, whose son-in-law was then president of the Oklahoma School of Mines in Miami, Oklahoma. Although Brooks openly hoped the young man could remain undisturbed in that position, Walton abruptly replaced him with a supportive legislator from Ottawa County. Then, Brooks voted against Walton's nomination of another supporter to become superintendent of vocational agriculture. Walton became furious with Brooks, and again replaced the occupants of the state board. That day, the Daily Oklahoman printed the story with the headline, "Brooks' Neck Expected to Feel the Ax Next." Walton explained his action to the press, "...the educational system must be removed as far as possible from political maneuvering,...(T)he university organization has been used against me by Yankee republicans and I believe that it should be in democratic hands."

== University of Missouri ==
The University of Missouri (UM) previously had indicated to Brooks that it would like to have him take the job as president. He had previously rejected the interest, because he had become interested in continuing in Norman. Besides, his wife loved the place, and even told him once that that was the place where she hoped to be buried after death.

Regarding Walton's replacement of the regents, Brooks realized that he had no future in Oklahoma without top-level political support. He called UM and asked if the presidency was still open. The answer was, "Yes." He travelled to Missouri to meet with the school officials. The next day, he received a formal job offer with an annual salary of $12,500. (Note: At the time he was receiving $10,000 per year from OU., pp. 74-76.) He gave them his verbal acceptance. When he got home he wrote a one-sentence letter of resignation to one of the regents, which was immediately accepted.

The Brooks family bade goodbye to Oklahoma. Within six months, the Oklahoma legislature had enough of Walton's arbitrary behavior and roughshod power plays. They passed articles of impeachment and removed him from the Governor's office.

The budgetary problems Brooks faced at UM were much the same as those he left in Oklahoma. At least the school had not developed into quite as big a mess as OU had when he arrived in Norman. Still, a bizarre incident in 1931 derailed his career. Some sociology professors allowed release of a "sex survey" that most of the regents and ordinary citizens found offensive to their social views. Brooks saw the document, which he called "sewer psychology" and wanted to fire the faculty members who had authorized sending it out without his prior approval. The American Association of University Professors joined in the uproar. The regents then blamed Brooks for misleading them and creating a national scandal. Unable to defend himself, he resigned, and moved to Kansas City, so that UM could find a new leader.

== Later life and subsequent death ==
Looking for something very different to do, he accepted the job as president of the Order of DeMolay, a Masonic institution for young men. When his wife died in 1941, Brooks brought her body back to Norman for burial. He lived the remainder of his life in Kansas City, Missouri, with the family of his daughter, Dorothy Brooks Callaway, her husband William Stocking Callaway, and their two daughters Penelope Brooks Callaway and Dorothy Ella Callaway.

== Notes ==
Academic offices
Preceded by Edwin F. Moulton	Superintendent of the Cleveland Municipal School District; 1906–1906	Succeeded by Edwin F. Moulton
Preceded by George H. Conley	Superintendent of Boston Public Schools; 1906–1912	Succeeded by Franklin B. Dyer
Preceded by A. Grant Evans	President of the University of Oklahoma; 1912–1923	Succeeded by James S. Buchanan
Preceded by John Carleton Jones	President of the University of Missouri; 1923–1930	Succeeded by Walter Williams
