= First Presbyterian Church (Nashville, Tennessee) =

Presbyterian congregation in Oak Hill, Tennessee, US

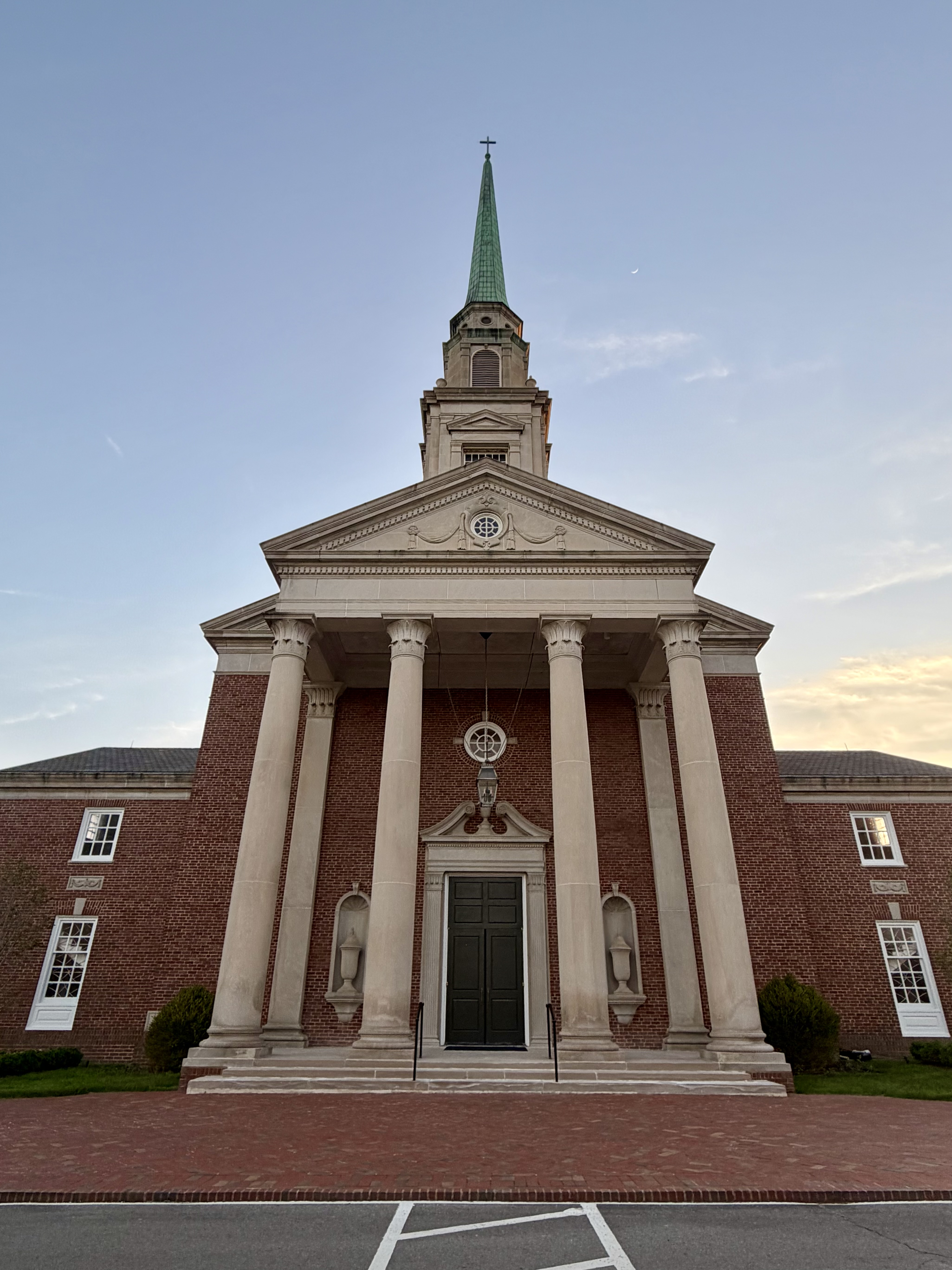
The First Presbyterian Church of Nashville (PCUSA) in Oak Hill, Tennessee

The First Presbyterian Church at one time was located at 154 5th Avenue North in Nashville, Tennessee. This location now houses the Downtown Presbyterian Church, a completely different congregation than First Presbyterian Church which moved to the suburbs in the 1950s. It is a member of the Presbyterian Church (USA). The membership stood at 4,265 in 2012.

The church was started in 1849 and the building housing the Downtown Presbyterian Church was added to the National Register of Historic Places in 1970. It is now located on 4815 Franklin Pike, Nashville, TN 37220. The head pastor is Dr. Ryan V. Moore and shares a campus with The Oak Hill Day School.

The church was publicly known for the wedding of Sondra Locke and Gordon Anderson that took place in 1967.
