= Sally Buchanan =

18th-century American settler

- Born: Sarah Ridley; December 1773; Watauga (now Elizabethton, Tennessee, U.S.)
- Died: November 23, 1831 (aged 57); Buchanan's Station, Tennessee, U.S.
- Burial place: Buchanan's Station Cemetery, Nashville, Tennessee, U.S.
- Known for: Role during Battle of Buchanan's Station
- Spouse: Major John Buchanan (m. 1791)
- Children: 13
- Relatives: Gordon Anderson (fourth great-grandson)

Sarah Ridley Buchanan (née Ridley; December 1773 – November 23, 1831) was an American settler in Tennessee. Credited with helping to defend Buchanan's Station during an attempted raid by Native Americans in 1792, Buchanan was called "the greatest heroine of the West" by writer Elizabeth F. Ellet. As stories about Buchanan's bravery spread, accounts of her life were sometimes embellished with fictional elements.

== Early life and marriage ==
Sarah Ridley was born in Watauga, an early settlement in East Tennessee, in December 1773. Her father was Captain George Ridley. (Note: In Flowering of the Cumberland, Harriette Arnow gives her father's name as "Colonel Daniel Ridley", a veteran of the American Revolutionary War, but Elizabeth Ellet and others state that her father's name was George.) According to Ellet, the Ridleys left Watauga in 1779 as part of a large party moving westward, and settled in the area near present-day Nashville, Tennessee, in 1780. The Ridleys' fort where Sarah lived was one of a dozen forts in the area built to protect their inhabitants from frequent attacks by the neighboring Cherokee and Creek Indians.

At the age of eighteen, Sarah married Major John Buchanan, one of the first settlers in the Cumberland Valley. A widower in his thirties, John's first wife Mary (née Kennedy), had died in childbirth. According to writer Harriette Simpson Arnow, Sally Buchanan was said to be larger than most other women in her day, weighing over two hundred pounds. Arnow wrote that Mrs. Buchanan could "pick up, and shoulder a two and one-half bushel sack of corn, or 150 pounds."

== Battle of Buchanan's Station ==
The Buchanans lived at Buchanan's Station, an enclosure of about one acre with a picketed fence and a blockhouse in each corner. They, and many of the other seven families living there, were slave owners.

Around midnight on September 30, 1792, a combined force of nearly 300 Chickamauga Cherokee, Creek, and Shawnee warriors attacked Buchanan's Station, but were thwarted in their attempt to breach the stockade walls and set fire to the fort.

Despite being heavily pregnant, Sally Buchanan carried bullets in her apron during the battle, and distributed them to the settlers who were defending the fort, at great risk to her own safety. She was said to have sung loudly to be heard above the gunfire, "More balls, more balls, fight like men, I'll give you more balls." Buchanan also supplied the men with whiskey. Some accounts claimed that during the one-hour firefight, she led a group of women including Nancy Mulherrin in acting as sentinels and loading guns; molding bullets from plates and spoons when they started running out of ammunition; and even firing on a few of the raiders. Major Buchanan later wrote about his wife, "Mrs. Buchanan has killed buffalo and deer, and cannot now plead innocence of aim and intent to kill an Indian."

== Later life and legacy ==
Buchanan gave birth to her first child eleven days after the battle of Buchanan's Station. She went on to have twelve more children: eight sons and four daughters. Both she and her husband are buried at the Buchanan's Station Cemetery in present-day Nashville, Davidson County, Tennessee.

A century later, historian Elizabeth Ellet dedicated a chapter in The Eminent and Heroic Women of America to Sarah Ridley Buchanan, and wrote, "The fame of this gallant defence went abroad, and the young wife of Major Buchanan was celebrated as the greatest heroine of the West."

In the mid-20th century, the Tennessee Historical Commission set up a brass plaque commemorating "Mrs. Buchanan" near the historical site of Buchanan's Station in Davidson County. The story of Sally Buchanan was told in History of Middle Tennessee by Stanley Horn, Tales of Perils and Adventures of Tennessee Pioneers by Octavia Bond, and Seedtime on the Cumberland and Flowering of the Cumberland by Harriette Arnow.
