= Frank Ballou =

Frank Washington Ballou (February 22, 1879 – February 2, 1955) was superintendent of Washington D.C. public schools from 1920 to 1943. Frank W. Ballou High School is named in his honor. He was the first president of the National Association of Directors of Educational Research, the organization that would eventually become the modern American Educational Research Association.

== Early life and education ==
Dr. Frank W. Ballou was born in Fort Jackson, St. Lawrence County, New York in 1879 to Hiram and Jennie (Foster) Ballou.

Ballou attended State Normal Training School in Potsdam, New York. He received a Bachelor of Science degree from Teachers College, Columbia University in 1904, a Master of Arts degree from the University of Cincinnati in 1908, and a Doctor of Philosophy from Harvard University in 1914.

== Career ==
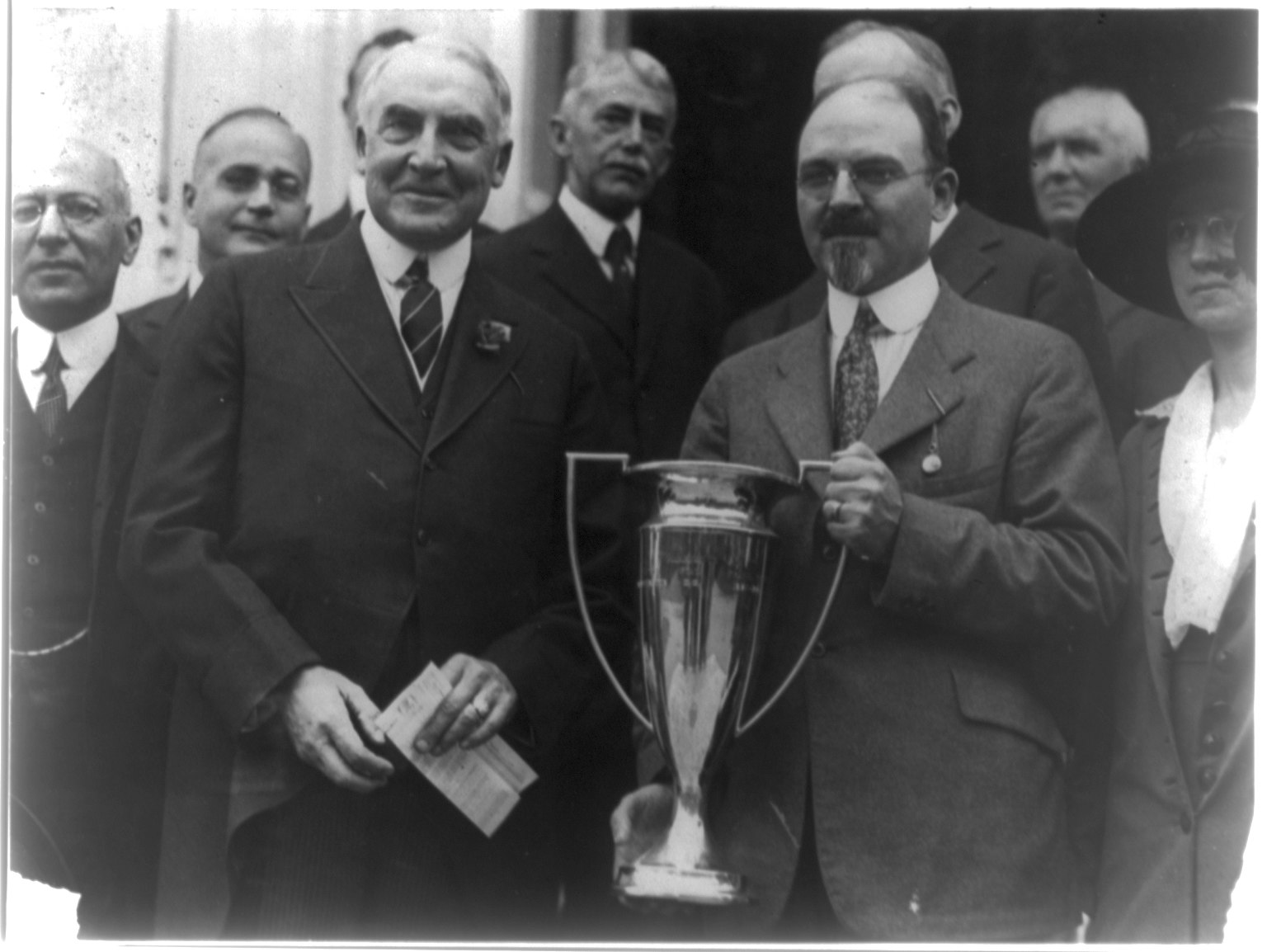
President Warren G. Harding presents Dr. Frank Ballou with an award cup presented to schools with the largest enrollment based on population.

Ballou spent three years as an assistant professor of education and director of school affiliation at the University of Cincinnati. He was a graduate student at Harvard University from 1910 to 1911 and lectured in school administration during Harvard's 1911 summer session. From 1911 to 1912 he assisted Professor Paul H. Hanus in his investigation of the New York City Department of Education. He also performed studies of Watertown, Milton, and Reading high schools and Milton public schools. In 1912 he returned to Harvard as a research fellow. In 1914 he was named director of promotions and educational measurement for Boston Public Schools. In 1917 he and Jeremiah E. Burke argued for the creation of junior high schools in Boston. Later that year he was promoted to assistant superintendent.

Ballou became superintendent of Washington, D.C. public schools in 1920. During this time, he oversaw the building of sixty new schools and raised teachers salaries. In 1926, he was elected President of the Department of Superintendance, National Educational Association.

== Marian Anderson controversy ==
In 1939, writing on behalf of the Board of Education of the District of Columbia now the District of Columbia State Board of Education, Ballou denied a request by contralto Marian Anderson to sing at the auditorium of the segregated white Central High School. As justification, he cited a federal law from 1906 requiring separate schools for the District. Meanwhile, the Daughters of the American Revolution had rejected a similar application. When Eleanor Roosevelt resigned from that organization in protest, author Zora Neale Hurston criticized her for remaining silent about the fact that the Board had also excluded Anderson. “As far as the high-school auditorium is concerned,” Hurston declared “to jump the people responsible for racial bias would be to accuse and expose the accusers themselves. The District of Columbia has no home rule; it is controlled by congressional committees, and Congress at the time was overwhelmingly Democratic. It was controlled by the very people who were screaming so loudly against the DAR. To my way of thinking, both places should have been denounced, or neither.” Although Anderson later performed at an open-air concert at the Lincoln Memorial, the Board retained its policy of exclusion.

== Death and legacy ==
Ballou died in 1955 in Washington, D.C.

Frank W. Ballou High School in Southeast, Washington, D.C. is named in his honor.

Cultural offices
Preceded by Inaugural office holder	President of the American Educational Research Association; 1915–1916	Succeeded by Walter S. Monroe (educational researcher)
