= Tahlonteeskee (Creek chief) =

Creek Indian chief (d. 1792)

Tahlonteeskee (or Talotisky, better known as Talotiskee) of the Broken Arrow clan, was a Creek chief who, as a skiagusta (war chief, or red chief) in a time of war, led a contingent of his warriors united with the Chickamauga Cherokee and Shawnee fighters in an attack into the Cumberland settlements. He was killed fighting alongside his allies during the failed attack against Buchannan's Station, a private frontier fort near Nashville, Tennessee (in the Southwest Territory), on September 30, 1792.

== The Cumberland invasion ==
In a surreptitious war plan made against Nashboro and its neighboring frontier settlements, Cherokee Chief John Watts (or Kunokeski, 'Young Tassel') assembled a coalition of Cherokee, Creek, and Shawnee warriors. Set on the destruction of White settlements in the Mero District, various Native American war parties left Running Water Town in late September 1792 with the intent of meeting up to attack and destroy Nashville and its fort, as the opening gambit of a war to rid Middle Tennessee once and for all of frontier settlers from the American east. The Creek faction included Chiefs Tahlonteeskee and Unacata. Fighting for the few Shawnee that were then living at Running Water Town was a young warrior, Tecumsah, under the command of his older brother, Cheeseekau (or Shawnee Warrior", also Siksika). For the Cherokee, the leaders included Watts, Little Owl, Bob Benge, Middle Striker, Pumpkin Boy and his brother, Doublehead.

When they reached the vicinity of the station, there was a heated debate among the war party's leaders about whether to bypass the stockade and press on directly to Nashville. The choice of the expedition's leader, Chief Watts, was to strike at Nashville first, thus by-passing the fortified station for the moment. Talotiskee's counsel was to first attack the small, and apparently weak way-station that the Creeks expected to fall quickly, and then move on to Nashville. Watts finally acquiesced, and the latter action was chosen.

The Battle of Buchanan's Station took place on the night of September 30, 1792, when the settlement was attacked by the combined force of over 300 (Note: A report from Blount on November 5, 1792, however, states: "...appeared to have been, Creeks, from 400 to 500; Cherokees, 200; Shawanese, from 30-40...) Lower Cherokee, Shawnee, and Creek Indians now under the leadership of Talotiskee, (upon whose counsel the decision to attack the station first had been made). The attack was repelled after about an hour of battle that included several attempts to set the bunkhouse, where the less than 20 defenders were situated, on fire. The raiders gave up when those in defense of the station caused an explosion that resembled cannon fire. Fearing that Fort Nashborough, only four miles away, was signalling that aide was on the way, the war parties dispersed back into the wild. This explosion may have been the result of an over-loaded blunderbuss exploding when fired at the Indians.

=== Death ===
The battle was costly to the raiding parties: Talotiskee was killed, along with Unacata, Cheeseekau, Little Owl, and about 25 others (all together, about 10% of the original raiding party). Watts was badly wounded and barely survived. After the battle, the remainder of Talotiskee's party stayed out into early October, attacking Black's Station on Crooked Creek, where they killed three men, wounded several more, and captured several horses.

== Sources ==
- American State Papers, Indian Affairs, Vol.1, 1789-1813; Congress of the United States; Washington, DC; 1831-1861 archives.
- McLoughlin, William G.; Cherokee Renascence in the New Republic; [sic] Princeton: Princeton University Press; 1992.
- Mooney, James; Myths of the Cherokee and Sacred Formulas of the Cherokee; Nashville; Charles and Randy Elder-Booksellers; 1982.
