= Downtown Presbyterian Church (Nashville) =

Historic church in Tennessee, United States

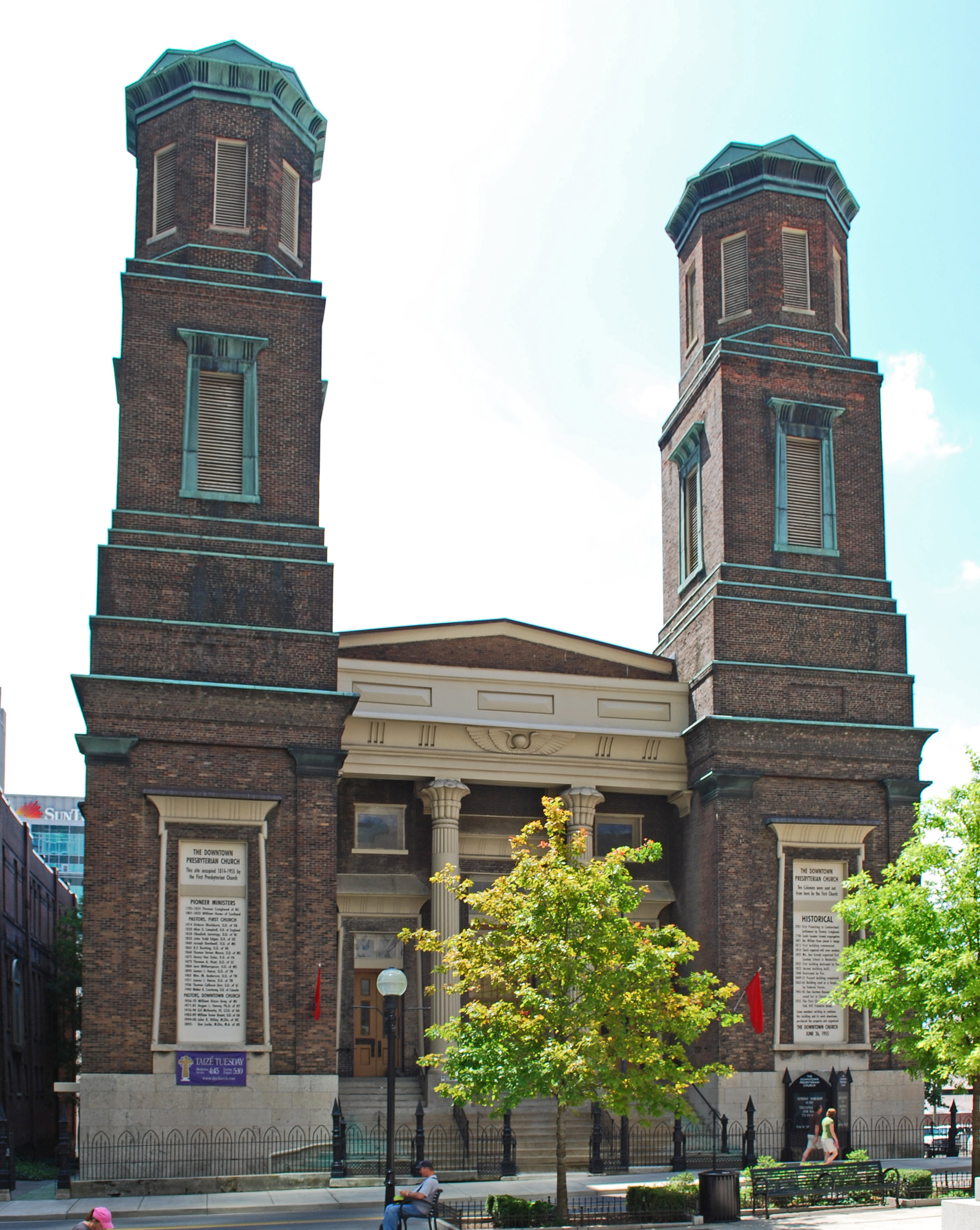
- 2010
- Downtown Presbyterian Church
- 36.1630°N 86.7798°W
- Location: 154 5th Ave North; Nashville, Tennessee
- Country: USA
- Denomination: Presbyterian Church (USA)
- Website: www.dpchurch.com

History
- Former name: First Presbysterian Church
- Status: Church

Architecture
- Functional status: Active
- Heritage designation: NRHP
- Designated: July 8, 1970
- Architect: William Strickland
- Style: Egyptian Revival
- Completed: 1846

Clergy
- Pastor: Zach Sasser
- Old First Presbyterian Church
- U.S. National Register of Historic Places
- U.S. National Historic Landmark
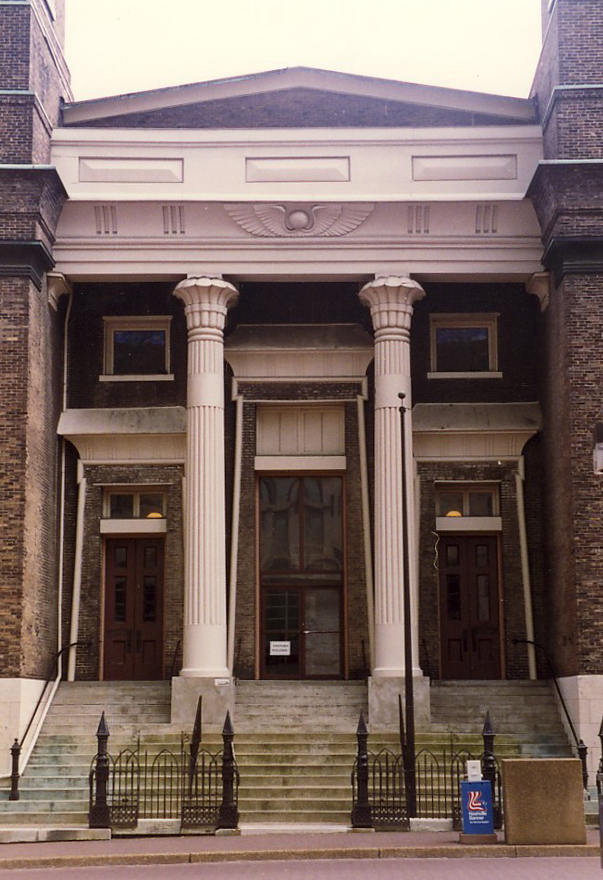
- The main façade of the church, showing Egyptian Revival details

- Location within Tennessee
- Location: 154 5th Ave., N. Nashville, Tennessee
- Built: 1849
- Architect: William Strickland
- NRHP reference No.: 70000608

Significant dates
- Added to NRHP: July 8, 1970
- Designated NHL: April 19, 1993

The Downtown Presbyterian Church in Nashville, Tennessee, a part of the Presbyterian Church (USA), was formerly known as First Presbyterian Church. The church is located at the corner of Rep. John Lewis Way and Church Street. As Old First Presbyterian Church it was designated a National Historic Landmark in 1993, for its distinctive Egyptian Revival architecture.

== History ==
The congregation began worshiping at this site in 1816. The first structure burned down in 1832, and a second sanctuary was constructed the same year. The third (and present) sanctuary was constructed after a fire in 1848 destroyed the previous structure. The name was changed to "Downtown" after First Presbyterian moved out of downtown Nashville in 1955.

The present sanctuary was designed by William Strickland, who also designed the Tennessee State Capitol, in the Egyptian Revival style. Exterior design elements include Egyptian style lotus columns and a winged sun disk. Interior Egyptian style elements include stained glass windows, woodwork and perspective renderings of Egyptian scenes on the sanctuary walls. The design was commissioned during an era when archaeological reports from Egypt were being reported in western publications. The twin towers of Downtown Presbyterian Church are reminiscent of the twin towers of St. Stephen's Church in Philadelphia, the city that Strickland lived in before he moved to Nashville. Surviving drawings illustrate that he also designed Second Presbyterian Church in Nashville, which was demolished in 1979.

Downtown Presbyterian Church is one of the few examples of Egyptian Revival architecture in the United States, and may be the best surviving ecclesiastical example. William Strickland also designed the second Mikveh-Israel Synagogue in Philadelphia in 1825 with Egyptian Revival elements, but it has not survived. Two other churches in the United States with Egyptian architectural themes that have survived are the First Baptist Church of Essex, Connecticut, and the First Presbyterian Church (Sag Harbor), New York, also known as the Whalers' Church. A virtual tour of the current Downtown Presbyterian Church is available on the church's website.

Several historic events and persons of note have been associated with this church. When Downtown Presbyterian was still known as First Presbyterian Church, President Andrew Jackson was a member. ("General" Andrew Jackson was presented with a ceremonial sword on the steps of the original church, after the Battle of New Orleans.) Tennessee Governor James K. Polk was inaugurated in the second sanctuary. The present church building was seized by Federal forces and served as a military hospital during the Civil War. It temporarily became Nashville's Union Hospital No. 8, with 206 beds. The church has continued to be used as a refuge by Nashville's citizens from floods in the 1920s, by soldiers during the Second World War and presently has an active social ministry to the less fortunate.

The Downtown Presbyterian Church has been a consistent support to the city's visual artists. Browsing Room, an artist-run gallery housed in the church's former library, has hosted over 100 exhibitions over ten years.The shows are focused on local artists but have gained national press, including coverage in Art Forum International in 2020.

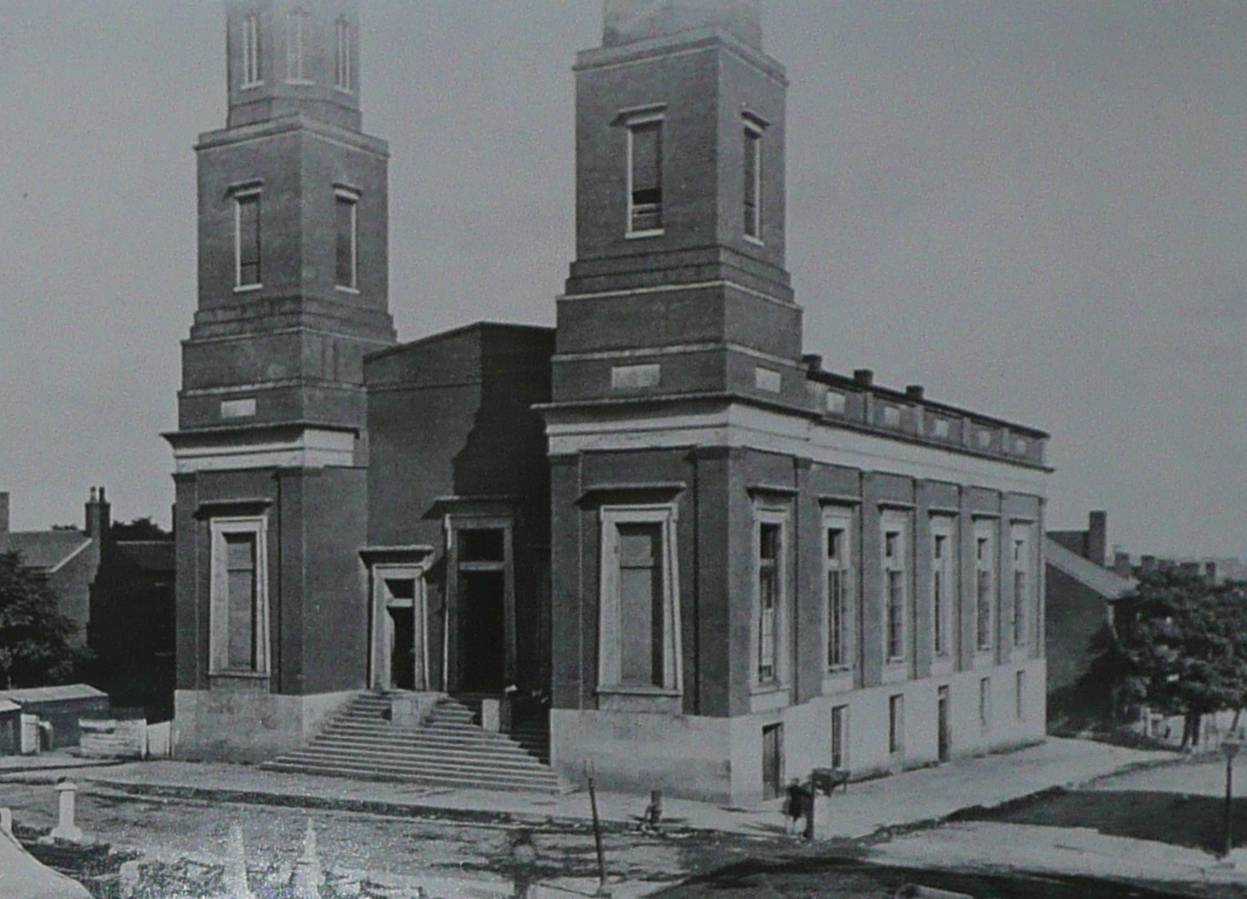
Building as it appeared in the 1860s

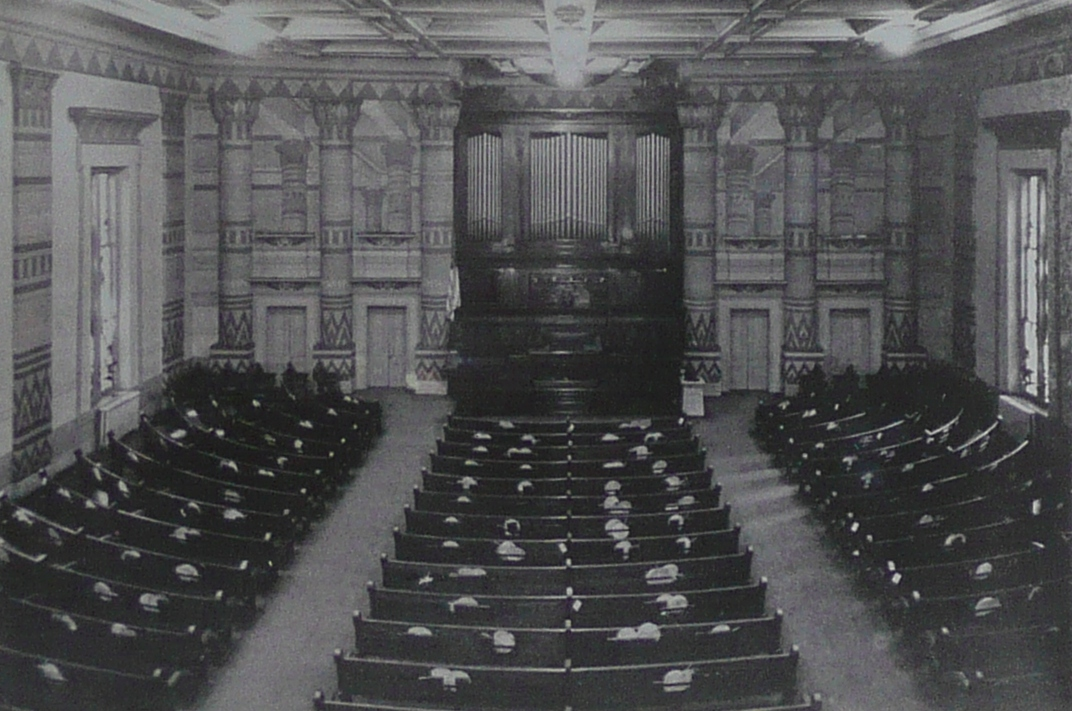
Interior about 1946

== See also ==
- List of National Historic Landmarks in Tennessee
- National Register of Historic Places listings in Davidson County, Tennessee
- Egyptian Revival architecture
