= Continuation high school =

Alternative to comprehensive high school

A continuation high school is an alternative to a comprehensive high school. In some countries it is primarily for students who are considered at risk of not graduating at the normal pace. The requirements to graduate are the same, but the scheduling is more flexible to allow students to earn their credits at a slower pace.

== Denmark ==
The Danish continuation schools (Danish: Efterskole) cover 8th to 10th forms and comprise a broad range of school types. The schools specialize in different educational themes or specific youth-groups. Typical examples are sports, outdoor activities and various creative arts productions. Many continuation schools in Denmark are boarding schools and a stay is normally privately funded by school-fees.

The majority of attending pupils have chosen a continuation school after having finished their elementary school programs at the 9th form. The admission to continuation schools has increased in the 2000s and the association of Danish Industry has criticized this new development as too costly for society, and a waste of a full year during a labor shortage.

A few continuation schools in Denmark deal specifically with young people with a troubled or criminal history. Disciplinary precautions are somewhat limited, with restraints and physical interactions not allowed. In some cases this has resulted in up to between 25 and 33 percent of the youth being expelled during a year at some schools. A single incident (January 2000) led one school to expel 23 percent of its students at once. Most of these continuation schools incorporate therapy and are similar to therapeutic boarding schools, but this concept is not known in Denmark.

Lately, some families who have immigrated to Denmark and have little understanding for the highly developed Danish youth culture are seeking strict orthodox Christian continuation schools for their children. The number of teenagers placed at these schools seemed to have been increasing since the Danish government took action against re-educational stays in the originally homeland. For a number of years Efterskoleforeningen (the association of Continuation Schools) have tried to target this parent-group with an offer to detain their children and keep them "safe" from the challenging parts of the regular youth culture. In 2010 the Danish government announced, that they would reduce the grants for students so the parents would have to pay a larger percentage of the cost for having a child attending the schools. A massive press campaign launched by Efterskoleforeningen inspired the government to adjust the grant-cuts slightly.

== United States ==
The first continuation school in the United States was established in 1909 in Cincinnati. Cincinnati Public Schools, led by superintendent Franklin B. Dyer, reached an agreement with labor unions and employers to reduce the working hours of high-school age employees by a half day without decreasing wages. Boston Public Schools established a similar program, which led Massachusetts General Court to pass a law requiring children between the ages of 14 and 16 to attend continuation school. Wisconsin enacted a similar law, which required children under the age of 17 to attend four hours of continuation school a week. By 1912 there were 16,000 students enrolled in Wisconsin's 30 continuation schools, the most in the country.

=== California ===
In the 2021–2022 school year, there were 432 continuation high schools in California, with an estimated enrollment of 46,000.

Counselors, site administration, and/or district administration can determine candidates for continuation high school; most candidates are recommended by on-site school counselors. Baseline qualifications for continuation high school vary district to district but all qualified candidates must undergo an academic review process.

Continuation high schools in California were created with the objective of meeting the needs of high school students. For such purpose, students from sixteen to eighteen years of age attend these schools. In order to graduate, students must complete the requirements set by the Department of Education in California. Continuation high schools require students to take the California High School Exit Exam (CAHSEE), which measures student growth in mathematics, reading, and writing. However, students still receive a high school diploma once they have completed the required credits.

== See also ==
- Therapeutic boarding school
- Behavior modification facility
- Alternative Learning System
