= Everett, Missouri =

Unincorporated community in Missouri, U.S.

Coordinates: 38°30′16″N 94°25′38″W

Everett is an unincorporated community in Cass County, in the U.S. state of Missouri.

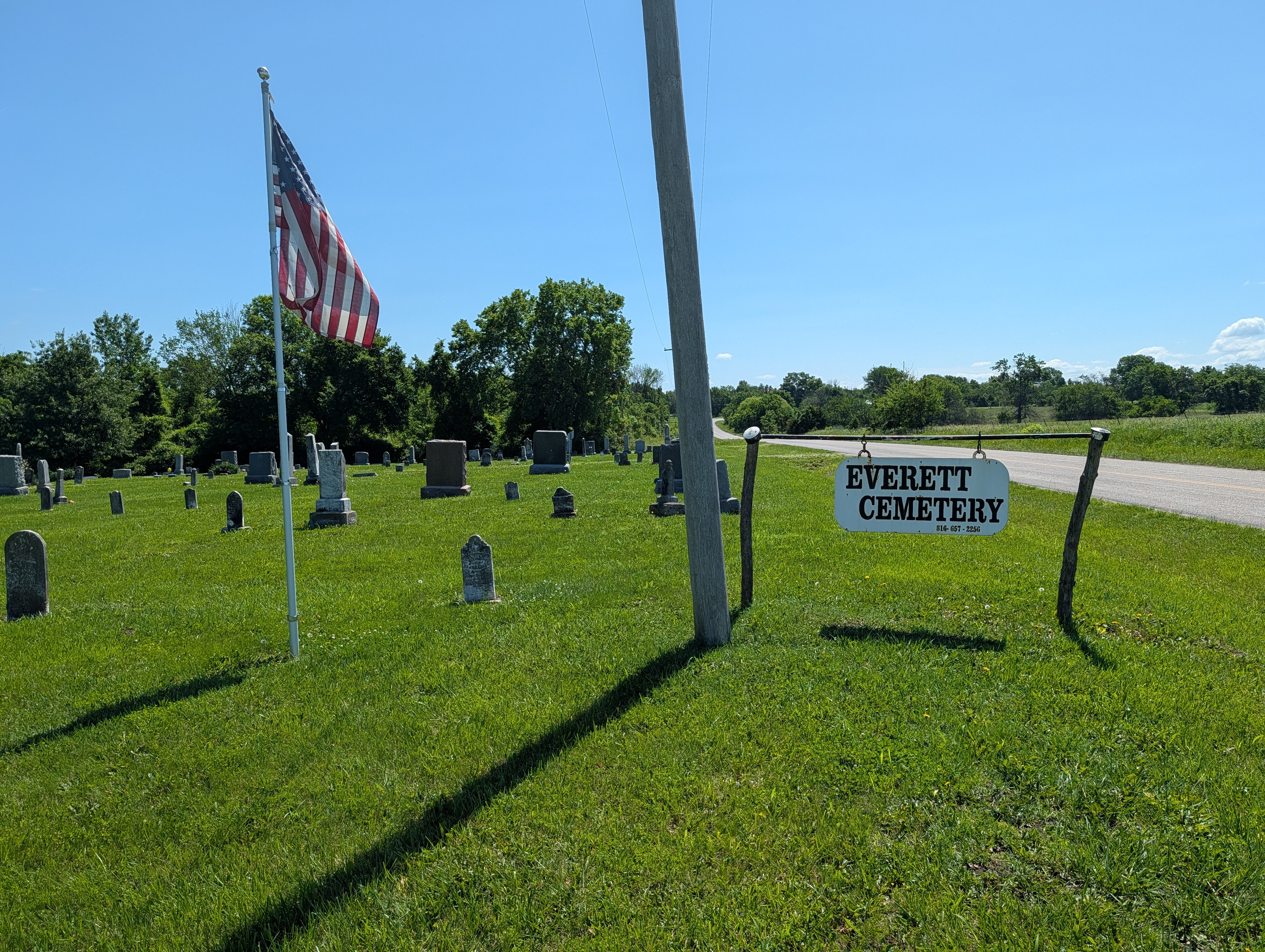
Everett Cemetery

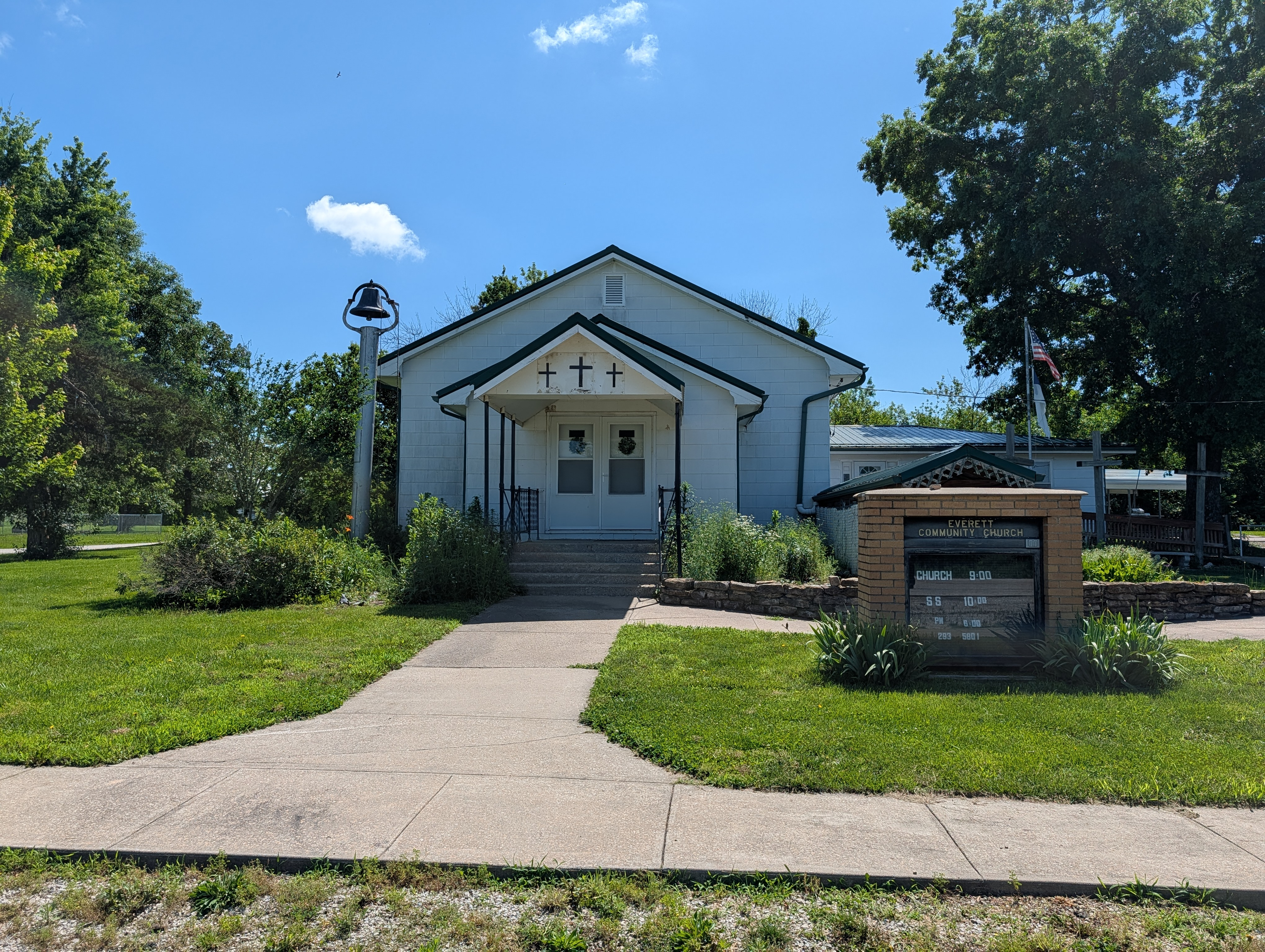
Everett Community Church

== History ==
Everett was platted in 1867, and named in honor of politician Edward Everett. A post office called Everett was established in 1857, and remained in operation until 1906.
