= Franklin B. Dyer =

American educator (1858–1938)

7th Superintendent of Boston Public Schools
- In office 1912–1918
- Preceded by: Stratton D. Brooks
- Succeeded by: Frank V. Thompson

Superintendent of Cincinnati Public Schools
- In office 1903–1912
- Preceded by: R. G. Boone
- Succeeded by: Randall J. Condon

Superintendent of Madisonville Public Schools
- In office 1887–1901
- Preceded by: Levi A. Knight
- Succeeded by: Edmund D. Lyon

Personal details
- Born: Franklin Benjamin Dyer; January 27, 1858 Warren County, Ohio, U.S.
- Died: May 10, 1938 (aged 80)
- Party: Republican
- Spouse: May Archibald (m. 1888)
- Children: 3
- Parent(s): John M. Dyer; Margaret (Martin) Dyer
- Education: Ohio Wesleyan University
- Profession: Educator

Franklin Benjamin Dyer (January 27, 1858 – May 10, 1938) was an American educator who served as superintendent of Cincinnati and Boston Public Schools.

== Early life ==
Dyer was born on January 27, 1858, in Warren County, Ohio, to John M. and Margaret (Martin) Dyer. He was educated in public schools and graduated from Ohio Wesleyan University in 1879. In 1888 he married May Archibald. They had three children and resided in Cincinnati's Hyde Park neighborhood until their move to Boston. Dyer was a Methodist and a member of the Republican Party.

== Career ==
After one year teaching at a rural school in Warren County, Dyer spent twenty years as a superintendent of schools in Loveland, Ohio. After a stint in Batavia, Ohio, he spent fourteen years as superintendent in Madisonville, Ohio. In 1901 he became as assistant superintendent of Cincinnati Public Schools. From 1902 to 1903 he served as the first ever dean of the Ohio State Normal School at Miami University.

In 1903, Dyer was appointed superintendent of Cincinnati Public Schools. He established a merit system for hiring teachers while maintaining the cooperation of the older teachers hired through political patronage. With the cooperation of various employers he created the country's first continuation school program, which allowed students who left school to work in a trade to attend school a few days a week. He also created "The Cincinnati Idea", which coordinated parents with the Kindergarten and the Kindergarten with the lower grades. He established the city's Kindergarten, vocational education, and domestic training programs as well as its first system of guidance counseling. He worked with the University of Cincinnati to establish a teacher's college there.

In 1912, Dyer was appointed superintendent of Boston Public Schools. During his tenure he dealt with a student strike, heatwave, polio epidemic, and a staffing shortage caused by World War I. He retired in 1918 and returned to Cincinnati, where he spent twelve years as a member of the city's board of education. He died on May 10, 1938.

Educational offices
Preceded by Levi A. Knight	Superintendent of Madisonville Public Schools; 1887–1901	Succeeded by Edmund D. Lyon
Preceded by R. G. Boone	Superintendent of Cincinnati Public Schools; 1903–1912	Succeeded by Randall J. Condon
Preceded by Stratton D. Brooks	Superintendent of Boston Public Schools; 1912–1918	Succeeded by Frank V. Thompson
