= Buchanan's Station =

Historic former stockade in Nashville, Tennessee

- Fortified stockade with bunkhouse
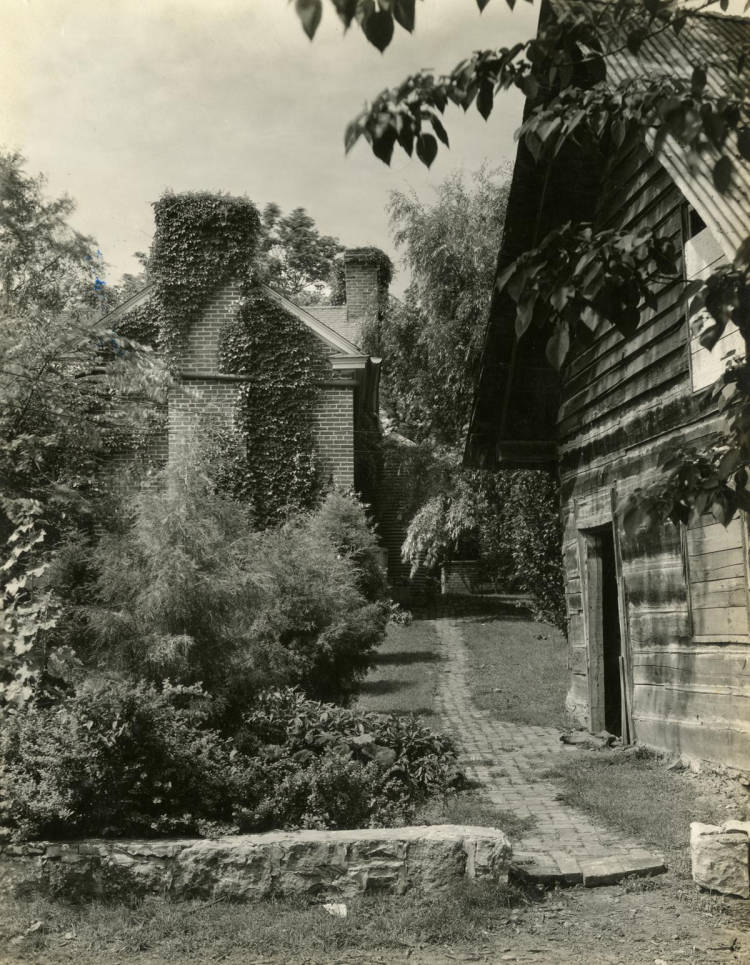
- Log building (right) c. 1936, a remnant of Buchanan's Station

- Location within Tennessee Location within the United States
- Coordinates: 36°08′45″N 86°42′47″W
- Country: United States
- Territory: Southwest Territory
- County: Davidson
- Settled: April 1784
- Station sold: 1841
- Compound demolished: c. 1843

Government
  - Major: John Buchanan
- Elevation: 599 ft (183 m)
- Photo of site courtesy of Tennessee State Library & Archives

Buchanan's Station was a fortified stockade established around 1784 in Tennessee. Founded by Major John Buchanan, the settlement was located in what is today the Donelson neighborhood of Nashville, Tennessee. (Note: The historic site of Buchanan's Station today is at the northwest corner of Elm Hill Pike and Massman Drive in Nashville.) On September 30, 1792, it was the site of the critical Battle of Buchanan's Station during the Cherokee–American wars of the late eighteenth century. The assault by a combined force of around 300 Chickamauga Cherokee, Muscogee Creek, and Shawnee, nominally led by Chief John Watts, was repelled by 15 gunmen under Major Buchanan defending the station. Although smaller raids continued in the region, it was the last major Native American attack on the American settlements in the Cumberland.

== History ==
In the spring of 1783, as the American Revolutionary War was drawing to a close, Major John Buchanan claimed land 4 miles (6.4 km) east of Fort Nashborough. Together with members of the Mulherrin family, Buchanan built a small fort that became known as Buchanan's Station. Major Buchanan (1759–1832) and his father had moved to the Cumberland River valley from South Carolina in 1779, and helped to build Fort Nashborough, where they resided until 1785.

The station was situated on a bluff above Mill Creek and was on an early road later referred to as the road to Buchanan's Mill. There were two other trails in the vicinity: the Nickajack Trail, a Native American trail leading from Chickamauga Cherokee lands near present-day Chattanooga to Nashville; and what became known as the First Holston Road between Nashville and Knoxville.

Buchanan's Station was average in size for a fortified stockade in the Cumberland, enclosing roughly 1 acre (0.40 ha). It comprised a few buildings surrounded by a picket stockade that included a solidly-built blockhouse at the front gate, overlooking Mill Creek. The Buchanans and seven other families lived in small log houses within the enclosure. Some of the families also held slaves.

=== Early hostilities ===
On May 8, 1786, Major Buchanan's brother Samuel left the station to plow the field near Mill Creek, when he was pursued and killed by a group of Native Americans, reportedly after jumping off the bluff. In 1787, Major Buchanan's father, John Buchanan Sr., was killed inside the fort with a tomahawk in front of his wife Jane, after the stockade gate had been left open. According to 19th-century geographer George William Featherstonhaugh, the incident occurred after the fort was taken by surprise by Cherokee and Choctaw forces; other settlers killed in the attack included William Mulherrin. Still other casualties among the settlers in the years before the Battle of Buchanan's Station included Cornelius Riddle and John Blackburn.

== Battle of Buchanan's Station ==
=== Background ===
Battle of Buchanan Station
- Part of Cherokee–American wars
Date	September 30, 1792
Location	Davidson County, Tennessee
Result	United States victory

Belligerents
Combined force of Chickamauga Cherokee, Creek, Shawnee	United States

Commanders and leaders
John Watts (WIA); Cheeseekau †; Kiachatalee †; Talotiskee †; Little Owl (WIA); Unacata (WIA)	Major John Buchanan

Strength
c. 300 warriors	15 gunmen

Casualties and losses
Many dead and wounded	None

In early 1792, a delegation of Overhill Cherokee met with United States Secretary of War Henry Knox in Philadelphia. Among their demands was that white settlers abandon the Cumberland, the traditional hunting grounds for several tribes. Preoccupied with the Northwest Indian War, Knox was determined to avoid escalating conflict in the Southwest Territory, and tried to pacify the delegation by increasing the annuity paid to them under the Treaty of Holston.

In the face of ongoing raids by Chickamauga Cherokee and Muscogee Creek, Governor William Blount and leaders of the militia in the Southwest Territory had petitioned Knox to send federal troops to the area. Knox sent only a small troop of cavalry, arms, and ammunition. While authorizing the raising of militia in the Mero District, Knox insisted that they remain in a defensive posture only, and suggested that any settlers encroaching on unceded lands in violation of the Treaty of Holston should be punished.

Meanwhile, raids by various tribes continued, emboldened by support from Hector, Baron de Carondelet, the Spanish governor of Louisiana, who wanted to halt American westward expansion. In May 1792, Governor Blount met with Chickamauga Cherokee leader John Watts and others believing that they wanted peace, but Watts proceeded to meet with Spanish officials and planned further attacks.

==== Capture of Ziegler's Station ====
On June 26, 1792, Ziegler's Station, roughly 30 miles (48 km) northeast of Buchanan's Station, was attacked and captured by a war party of Shawnee, Cherokee, and Creek, in a major setback for settlements in the Cumberland. The assault was led by Shawnee war chief Cheeseekau, also known as Shawnee Warrior, and Cherokee leader Little Owl, a brother of the late Dragging Canoe. During the attack, the war party set fire to the fort, forcing the occupants of Ziegler's Station to run out into the open, where they were captured. Several settlers were killed, and the survivors were taken prisoner and most were eventually returned in exchange for ransom.

==== War councils ====
In early September 1792, John Watts called a council of Native American leaders in Willstown to discuss their next move. Despite having been advised by Arturo O'Neill, a Spanish official, to avoid taking aggressive action, Watts rallied the Chickamauga to go to war against the United States. Although Bloody Fellow initially opposed the decision, one of the Cherokee delegates to Philadelphia, Cheeseekau, and White Owl's Son both declared their support for Watts. At a subsequent meeting at Lookout Mountain, they developed a plan to strike Nashville on the Cumberland, instead of attacking the Holston settlements as was initially discussed.

==== Preparations ====
By September 11, 1792, Governor Blount had received warnings about the Chickamauga plan to declare war from multiple sources, including Little Turkey, who wrote to Blount that the decision involved only the "five lower towns on the Big river" and did not have the consent of the whole Cherokee nation. Other informants included interpreters James Carey and John Thompson, as well as frontiersman James Ore, who reported hearing that a war party of 500, including 100 Muscogee Creek, was heading to the Cumberland.

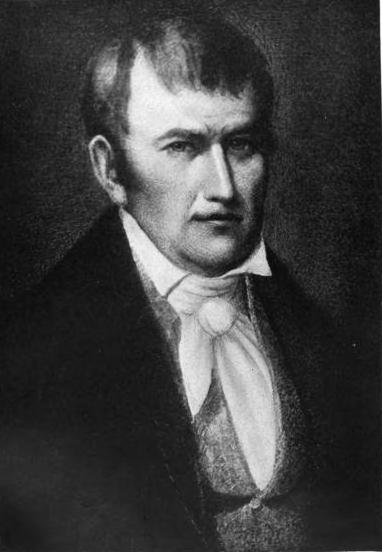
General James Robertson

Blount immediately ordered General James Robertson to mobilize the militia in the Mero District, and sent Captain Samuel Handley to Robertson's aid, along with 45 men. Robertson gathered 300 men at an encampment at Rain's Spring, two and a half miles south of the bluffs.

In the meantime, Blount received disingenuous letters of reassurance from Bloody Fellow and Chief Glass claiming that a war party had started to gather, but had been dispersed. Cherokee chief Unacata, also known as "White Man-killer", went so far as to visit Blount at his home in Knoxville and profess his friendship, before joining Watts on the war path.

Persuaded that war was not imminent, Blount sent another letter to Robertson ordering him to dismiss the militia. Robertson, however, hesitated after receiving word from his own informants, Richard Findelstone and Jonathan Deraque, that Watts was in fact planning to attack. In addition, one of his scouts, Abraham Castleman, reported finding the trail of a large party near Black Fox's Camp at present-day Murfreesboro, which was suspiciously deserted. Robertson put the militia to work at Buchanan's Station, the dilapidated outpost four miles east of Nashville which was most exposed in the event of a strike on the town. There, the men under his command rebuilt the stockade, built new blockhouses, and installed a "new heavy gate".

The march from the lower towns of the Tennessee River to the Cumberland should have only taken five or six days at the most, but two weeks passed with no further confirmation of a war party on its way. Blount later wrote, "Difference of opinion, as the mode and place of attack, at the rendezvous after they passed at the Tennessee, probably was the cause of the delay; I have no other way to account for it", pointing out that this was often the case when more than one Native American nation was involved. One theory is that Watts wanted to strike the larger fort at Nashville first to preserve an element of surprise, while Shawnee war chief Cheeseekau and Creek chief Talotiskee insisted on attacking Buchanan's Station first, to avoid leaving an armed garrison in their rear. Another possible explanation was that the chiefs had been waiting for their own scouts to return with intelligence.

On September 28 or 29, Robertson finally dismissed the militia, which had grown restless. Captain Rains and Abraham Kennedy had returned after surveying one of the routes leading to Buchanan's Station and had given the all clear that "No traces of an Indian army are anywhere to be seen!" Historian Elizabeth Ellet wrote that many of the militia members were relieved to return to their own stations, but also felt trepidation about possible hostilities to follow. Meanwhile, the war party was advancing toward Buchanan's Station, most likely via the Nickajack Trail.

=== Prelude ===
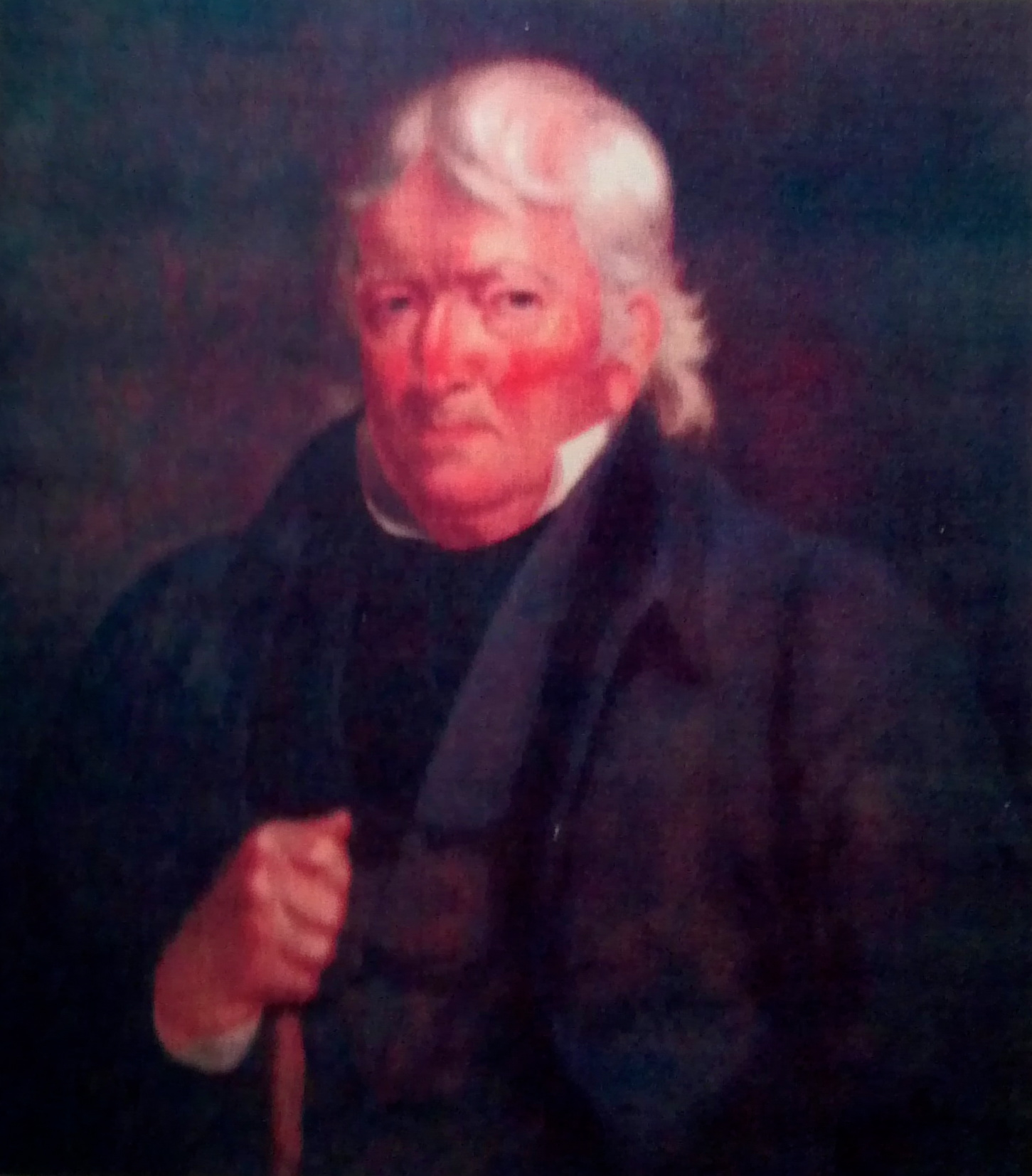
Major John Buchanan

Concerned for the safety of the stockade, Major Buchanan quietly urged a handful of men from the militia to remain at Buchanan's Station to keep watch for a few extra days. He confided only in his wife Sally about the extent of his fears, worried that the nineteen men residing there would abandon Buchanan's Station for safer outposts.

On the day the militia left, Buchanan sent two scouts, Jonathan Gee and Seward Clayton, out into the countryside to find out what they could, but the two men did not return. Around the same time, John Watts had dispatched his own scouts, John Walker and George Fields, both mixed-race Cherokee men who were dressed like settlers, as part of an advance party. Clayton and Gee encountered the advance party and were killed, allowing Watts and his men to proceed toward Buchanan's Station undetected.

=== Battle ===
At dusk on Sunday, September 30, 1792, John Watts approached Buchanan's Station with a force of nearly 300 warriors who were nominally under his command. According to historian John P. Brown, there were 281 in the war party, including 167 Chickamauga Cherokee, led by Little Owl, Kiachatalee, and John Taylor, who led 50 mounted men. (Note: A later report from Blount on November 5, 1792, stated a much higher figure: "appeared to have been, Creeks, from 400 to 500; Cherokees, 200; Shawanese, from 30-40...) Chief Talotiskee led 83 Creek warriors from Broken Arrow Town. Cheeseekau, the eldest brother of Tecumseh, led a group of 30 Shawnee from Running Water; historian John Sugden argues that young Tecumseh himself was also present during the attack.

As they paused to discuss the tactical plan of attack, objections were raised against delaying the assault until morning. Some sources suggest Watts had initially proposed hiding on the banks of Mill Creek and waiting until the front gate was opened in the morning – when the women would come out to milk the cows, or the men would go about their daily business – to rush the gate. Instead, consensus emerged to set fire to the rear of the fort while it was dark, and attack the inhabitants of Buchanan's Station as they fled out the front.

Around midnight, they left their horses one mile from the fort, and headed toward Buchanan's Station by foot under a full moon. Cheeseekau led his men within 10 yards of the front gate, but the agitation of the cattle outside the stockade walls alerted John McCrory, who was standing guard inside one of the blockhouses. Looking through the port hole, McCrory saw a squad of 40 warriors outside the gate and fired the first shot of the battle, which apparently killed Cheeseekau instantly. The warriors immediately returned fire.

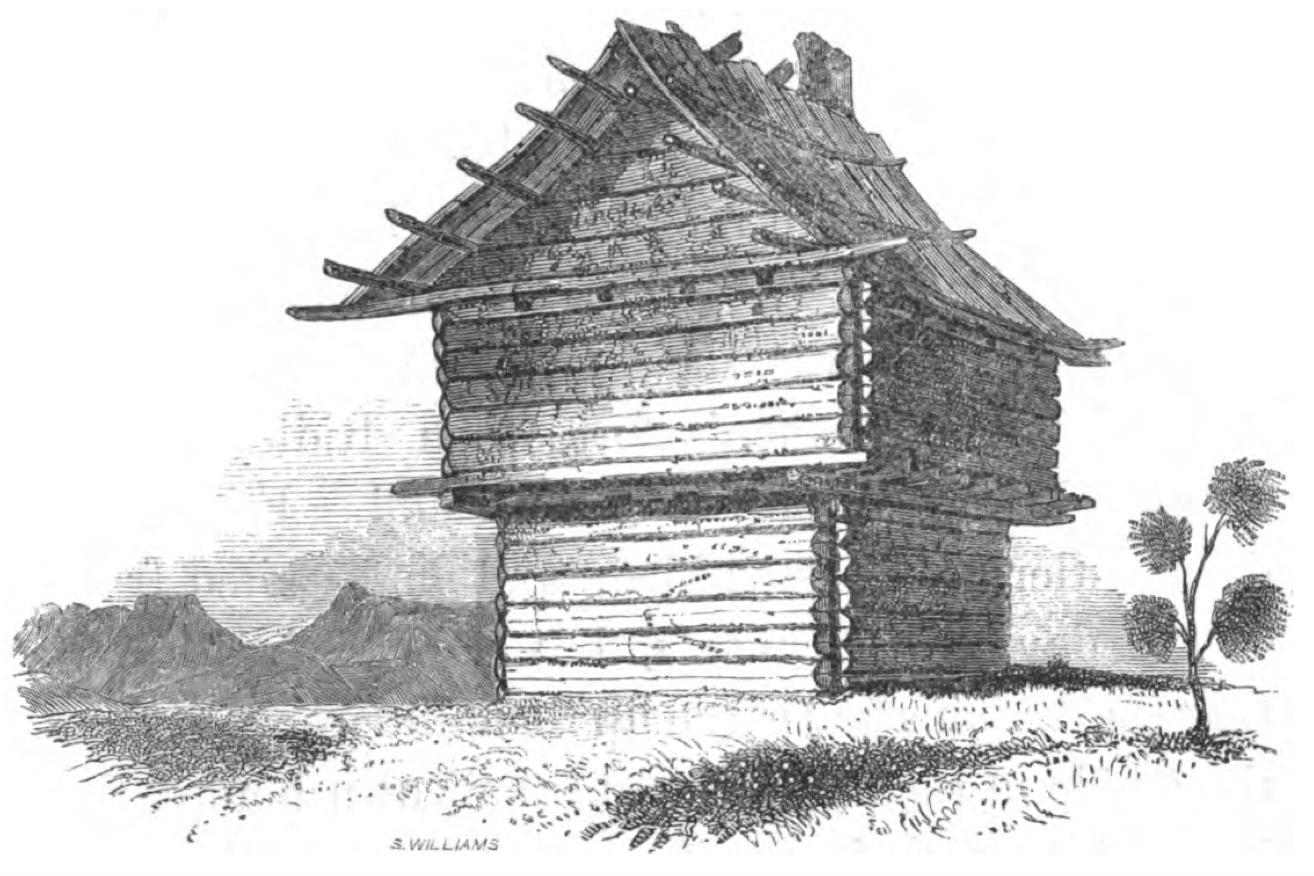
Example of a block house such as those at Buchanan's Station. The upper floor projected outward, with port holes in the upper chamber enabling defenders to shoot at attackers.

The exchange of heavy gunfire continued for one hour, during which Kiachatalee tried unsuccessfully to set fire to the fort. Torch in hand, he climbed the walls and reached the roof of one of the blockhouses. Falling to the ground after getting shot, Kiachatalee persisted in trying to set the bottom logs on fire, despite being mortally wounded. According to historian John Buchanan, the main reason he failed was because many of the structures at Buchanan's Station had been newly built out of green wood, which was difficult to burn.

The 15 gunmen defending Buchanan's Station that night were successful in keeping the constant stream of attackers at bay, and there were no casualties among those inside. The attackers fired thirty balls through one of the "overjutting" port holes; the balls were later found lodged in the ceiling. John Watts was shot through both legs early in the gunfight, and at first believed he would die. Talotiskee led his men in a charge, and was killed instantly. McCrory was the only gunman mentioned by name in Blount and Robertson's original reports on the battle.

Sally Buchanan was widely credited for her bravery during the firefight, and stories about her heroic actions have taken on legendary proportions. Heavily pregnant, she distributed ammunition which she carried in her apron to the gunmen. According to some accounts, she rallied the men by loudly singing, "More balls, more balls, fight like men, I'll make you more balls", and also distributed whiskey. Other stories have suggested that Mrs. Buchanan led the other women in the station including Nancy Mulherrin in molding more ammunition out of plates and spoons; making a "display of hats" so that it appeared from outside that there were more gunmen in the station than there actually were; and loading and firing guns themselves.

Another popular story involved a young Irishman named Jimmy O'Connor, who did not have his own rifle and was handling the Buchanans' heavy old blunderbuss instead. Not realizing that the blunderbuss hadn't actually fired when he pulled the trigger, O'Connor overfilled it until it finally fired all the shot at once, startling the war party as well as himself, as he was blown back to the other side of the room. One account went as far as to suggest that the mishap with the blunderbuss, which "boomed" like a cannon, was what finally caused the attackers to withdraw. Other accounts state that the sound that was heard was the actual swivel cannon at Nashville signaling that help was on its way to Buchanan's Station.

As the combined forces retreated, they took away the bodies of their dead and wounded in blanket litters, except for Kiachatalee, who had fallen so close to the stockade wall, they were unable to recover his body safely. Seizing some corn and livestock, they left the bloodied grass outside the fort strewn with debris, including Indian-made swords, hatchets, pipes, and kettles, and what Robertson later described as "a fine Spanish blade...richly mounted in the Spanish fashion".

=== Aftermath ===
The attack on Buchanan's Station, successfully repelled by its defenders, was the final major Native attack on American settlements in the Cumberland, although smaller raids would continue. In The Annals of Tennessee to the End of the Eighteenth Century, historian J. G. M. Ramsey called the actions of the fifteen gunmen "a feat of bravery which has scarcely been surpassed in all the annals of border warfare." In The Eminent and Heroic Women of America, Elizabeth Ellet called Sally Buchanan "the greatest Heroine of the West" due to her determined leadership and aid to the fort's defense during the conflict.

For John Watts and his combined force of Chickamauga Cherokee, Creek, and Shawnee warriors, the campaign was a debacle. Having failed to inflict a single casualty on the settlers, the Native American losses were considerable. Among those killed were leaders of the war party including Cheeseekau, Talotiskee, and Kiachatalee. In addition, Little Owl and Unacata were mortally wounded. Watts, who had been gravely injured, was carried back to the Lower Towns in a stretcher between two horses, but survived.

As the main assault on Buchanan's Station was unfolding, two separate war parties of about 60 warriors each had been sent to ambuscade the two roads leading from Holston to the Cumberland. Chief Doublehead and his men were on the Kentucky Road, where they took one or two scalps, and later encountered Lieutenant William Snoddy and 34 militia men; in the ensuing fight, 13 Chickamauga Cherokee were killed, while Snoddy lost only two men. Doublehead then proceeded with his remaining men toward Nashville, only to find out about his nephew Watts's bitter defeat.

Meanwhile, Chief Middle Striker led a party of warriors on the Walton Road. In November 1792, Middle Striker and his men ambushed Captain Samuel Handley and 42 militiamen heading from Knoxville to Nashville as reinforcements, killing three of them and capturing Handley himself as a prisoner. In the months that followed, Governor Blount and Watts negotiated for Handley's release, which finally occurred on January 24, 1793. Historian John P. Brown wrote that although Watts made peaceful overtures toward Blount, his real intent was to lull Blount into complacency, so that the United States would not plan a retaliatory invasion. Following the Battle of Buchanan's Station, Watts received a letter of sympathy from Spanish Governor Carondelet at New Orleans, who suggested that the King of Spain might intervene with the Americans to restore Native lands. Encouraged, the Chickamauga, Creek, and Shawnee continued to plan joint action against the Americans.

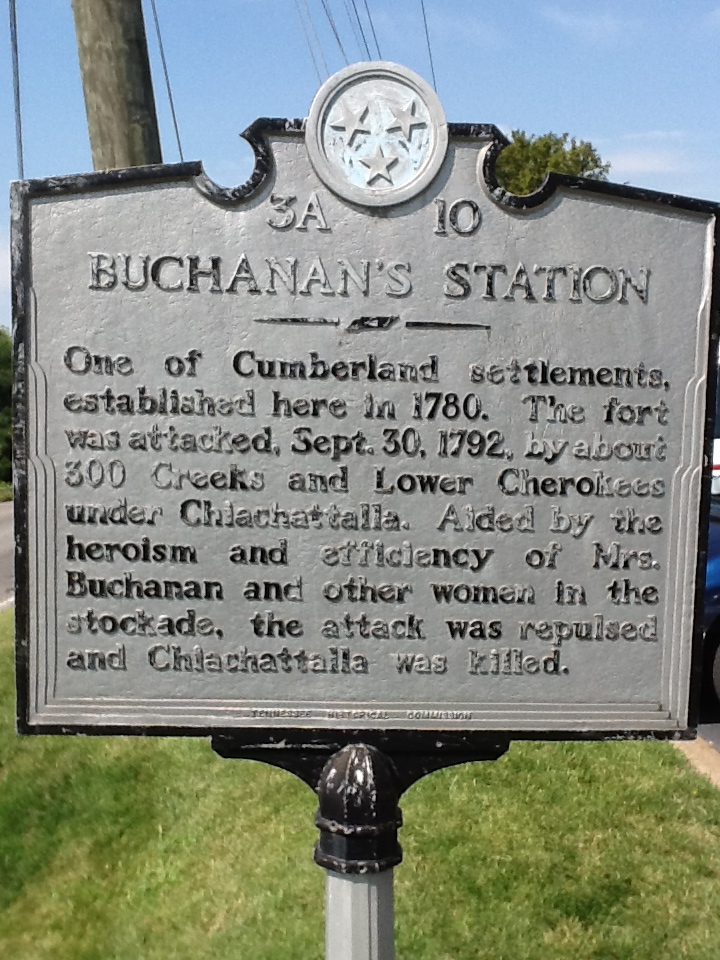
THC's historic marker at Buchanan's Station (Note: The marker reads: "3A-10; Buchanan's Station. One of Cumberlands settlements, established here in 1780. The fort was attacked September 30, 1792, by about 300 Creeks and Lower Cherokee, under Chiachattalla [ed.: Kiachatalle]. Aided by the heroism and efficiency of Mrs. Buchanan and other women in the stockade, the attack was repulsed and Chiachattalla was killed.")

== Legacy ==
Major Buchanan lived at Buchanan's Station until his death in 1832; he was predeceased by Sally, who died one year prior. In 1841, their son Richard Buchanan sold the property to Ralph Smith.

A roadside plaque now marks the spot of Buchanan's Station, at the corner of Elm Hill Pike and Massman Drive. The actual site is occupied by a large commercial building complex.

Today, the only remains of the settlement is the still extant cemetery that holds the identifiable graves of about 65 family, friends, settlers, and slaves, including the graves of John and Sally Buchanan, and at least five residents who were killed before the battle. (Note: Known casualties probably interred here include: Samuel Buchanan (killed May 8, 1786, while ploughing a field); Cornelius Riddle (killed November 1786 while hunting); William Mulherrin and John Buchanan, Sr. (died 1787; both hacked to death with tomahawks—John in the presence of his wife, Jane (née Trindle) Buchanan—while inside the compound); and John Blackburn (speared to death, 1789).)

== See also ==
- Natchez Trace
- Nickajack Expedition
