= David Ross Boyd =

American university president (1853–1936)

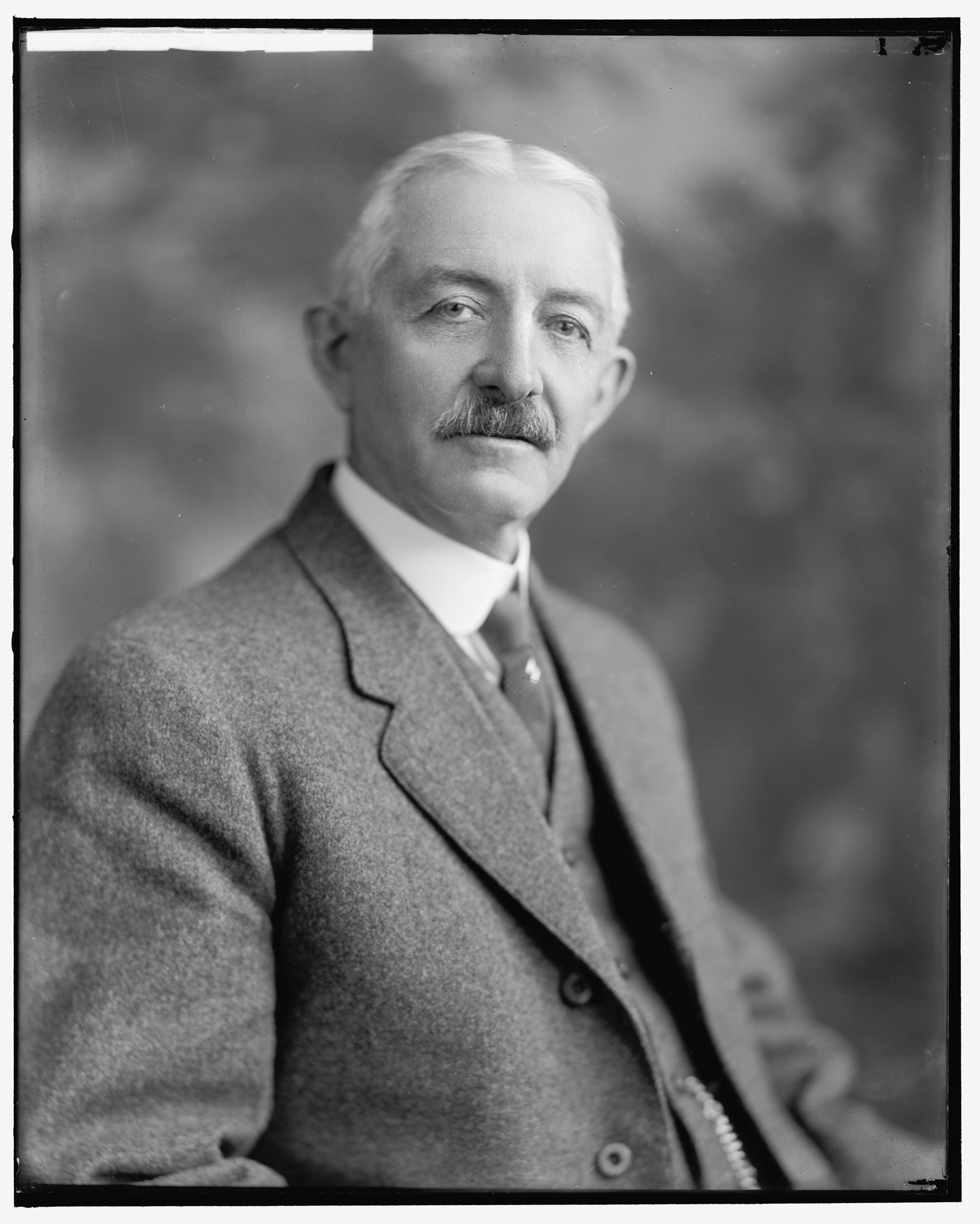

5th President of the University of New Mexico
- In office 1912–1919
- Preceded by: Edward Gray
- Succeeded by: David Spence Hill

1st President of the University of Oklahoma
- In office 1892–1908
- Preceded by: Position established
- Succeeded by: A. Grant Evans

Personal details
- Born: July 31, 1853 Coshocton, Ohio
- Died: November 17, 1936 (aged 83) Glendale, California
- Party: Republican
- Education: College of Wooster

David Ross Boyd (July 31, 1853 – November 17, 1936) was an American educator and the first president of the University of Oklahoma.

Boyd was born in Coshocton, Ohio, and obtained a bachelor's, master's, and honorary doctorate degree from the small College of Wooster, where he was a member of the Beta Theta Pi fraternity. He began his career as a superintendent of the Van Wert, Ohio school system from 1880 to 1888 when he left and took over the Arkansas City, Kansas school system. While there, members of the Board of Regents of the University of Oklahoma came to his schools to view the heating system that Boyd had installed. The Board was impressed and chose him as the university's first president with a salary of $2,400. In addition to his role as University President, he also served as Professor of Mental and Moral Science, as he was a devout Presbyterian.

He brought his religion with him to the university where he held chapel services each morning, which included Scripture readings and a brief three-minute sermon. Around the turn of the 20th century, Boyd was president of the territorial university as well as the territorial Board of Education, making him the most prominent man in education in the area.

Shortly after arriving in Norman, Oklahoma, he began a project for which he has since become best known. He began preparations for planting thousands of trees around campus, and began buying young trees from a bankrupt nursery in Wichita, Kansas. At first, the people of Norman were outraged, but when they learned Boyd was purchasing the trees and the water with his own money they became grateful. He reportedly planted nearly 10,000 trees in his first 18 months on the job and developed a campus nursery with more than 40,000 trees.

After the Oklahoma Territory became the State of Oklahoma, one of the first acts of the new Oklahoma Governor, Charles N. Haskell, was to replace many of the original faculty at the university. This included Boyd as well as Vernon Louis Parrington, the Harvard-educated professor who started the English Department and went on to win a Pulitzer Prize. The Governor accused Boyd of being an "aristocrat, not democratic enough." Upon leaving the University of Oklahoma, he became the president of the University of New Mexico in 1912. He died on November 17, 1936, aged 83.

Preceded by First holder	President of the University of Oklahoma; 1892–1908	Succeeded by A. Grant Evans
Preceded by Edward Gray	President of University of New Mexico; 1912–1919	Succeeded by David Spence Hill
