= List of presidents of the University of Tulsa =

This is a list of the presidents of the University of Tulsa.

== Presidents ==
University of Tulsa Presidents
#	Name	Years served	Comments
--	William Addison Caldwell	1894–1896	First President of Henry Kendall College (Muskogee).
--	William Robert King	26 June 1896 – 28 February 1899	Founder, and second President of Henry Kendall College (Muskogee). Rev. King had previously served the area as an official of the synod.
1	A. Grant Evans	1 March 1899 – 31 May 1908	Last President of Henry Kendall College (Muskogee), first President of Henry Kendall College (Tulsa) after the move from Muskogee to Tulsa in 1907. Became the second president of the University of Oklahoma.
2	Levi Harrison Beeler	2 June 1908–December 1909	President of Henry Kendall College (Tulsa).
3	Seth Reed Gordon	December 1909–June 1911	President of Henry Kendall College (Tulsa), First President Emeritus.
4	Frederick William Hawley	June 1911–5 October 1915	President of Henry Kendall College (Tulsa).
5	Ralph J. Lamb	23 November 1915 – 1916	President of Henry Kendall College (Tulsa).
6	Charles Evans	1 August 1916 – 3 June 1917	President of Henry Kendall College (Tulsa).
7	James Gilmer McMurtry	1917–1918	President of Henry Kendall College (Tulsa).
8	Arthur Lee Odell	1 April 1918 – 3 June 1920	President of Henry Kendall College (Tulsa).
9	James Marcus Gordon	June 1920–1 June 1924	President of Henry Kendall College (Tulsa). First president after formation of the University of Tulsa from Henry Kendall College in 1921.
10	Franklin Geselbracht Dill	1924–1927	Dean and Acting president (1924-1926), President (1926-1927)
--	John Duncan Finlayson	1 July 1927 – 15 March 1934	Title was Chancellor.
--	Ralph L. Langenheim	1934–1935 (acting)	Vice President 1934 - 1936.
11	C. I. Pontius	28 June 1935 – 30 June 1959	Longest serving president (24 years).
12	Ben Graf Henneke	1 July 1959 – 31 January 1967	Only University of Tulsa alumnus to serve as president.
13	Eugene Laurrel Swearingen	1 February 1967 – 15 June 1968	Previously was vice president of Oklahoma State University. Resigned from University of Tulsa presidency to become president of Bank of Oklahoma. In 1982, he joined Oral Roberts University, where he remained until his death in 2002.
14	Joseph Paschal Twyman	15 June 1968 – 21 May 1989	Second longest serving president (22 years); New funding by donors led to major building campaign 1968-72. No major projects begun 1972-1989. Twyman died in office.
--	Michael W. Davis	1990 (interim)	Died in office
--	E. Joe Middlebrooks	1990 (interim)	
15	Robert Donaldson	1990–1996	
16	Robert W. Lawless	1996–2004	
17	Steadman Upham	2004–2012	Held concurrent positions as President and professor of archaeology. Raised $698 million. Strengthened quality of faculty and students and expanded facilities during his first term. Led outreach partnerships, including Gilcrease Museum, Helmerich Center, and Bob Dylan Archive management. Retirement effective in 2012 was announced during 2011.
18	Geoffrey Orsak	July 2012 – September 2012	Former dean of the Lyle School of Engineering at SMU, appointment effective July 1, 2012; his termination was announced on September 12, 2012 Abruptly terminated by Board of Trustees, without public explanation, after 77 days. No significant accomplishments reported.
19	Steadman Upham	October 2012 – November 2016	Recalled by Board of Trustees as president in 2012 after departure of President Orsak, thus becoming only two-term president. Retired again in 2016. Planned to return as professor emeritus, but instead died in 2017 from complications of surgery.
20	Gerard Clancy	November 2016 – January 2020	Clancy joined TU as the Dean of College of Health Sciences in 2014 after six years as provost and eight years as president of University of Oklahoma-Tulsa (OU-T}.
-	Janet K. Levit	January 2020 – June 2021 (interim)	Dr. Levit was appointed as Interim President shortly after Dr. Clancy told the Board that he could no longer serve as president, because of unspecified health issues. She had served as vice president for two years during the Clancy administration. Her husband, Ken Levit, is president of Oklahoma University - Tulsa.
21	Brad Carson	July 2021 – May 31, 2025	After a lengthy search, former Congressman Carson was announced as the 21st President on April 5, 2021, effective July 1, 2021.
-	Rick Dickson	2025	Interim
22	Stacy Leeds	July 1, 2026 –	
