= James Joyce's erotic letters to Nora Barnacle =

1909 erotic letters

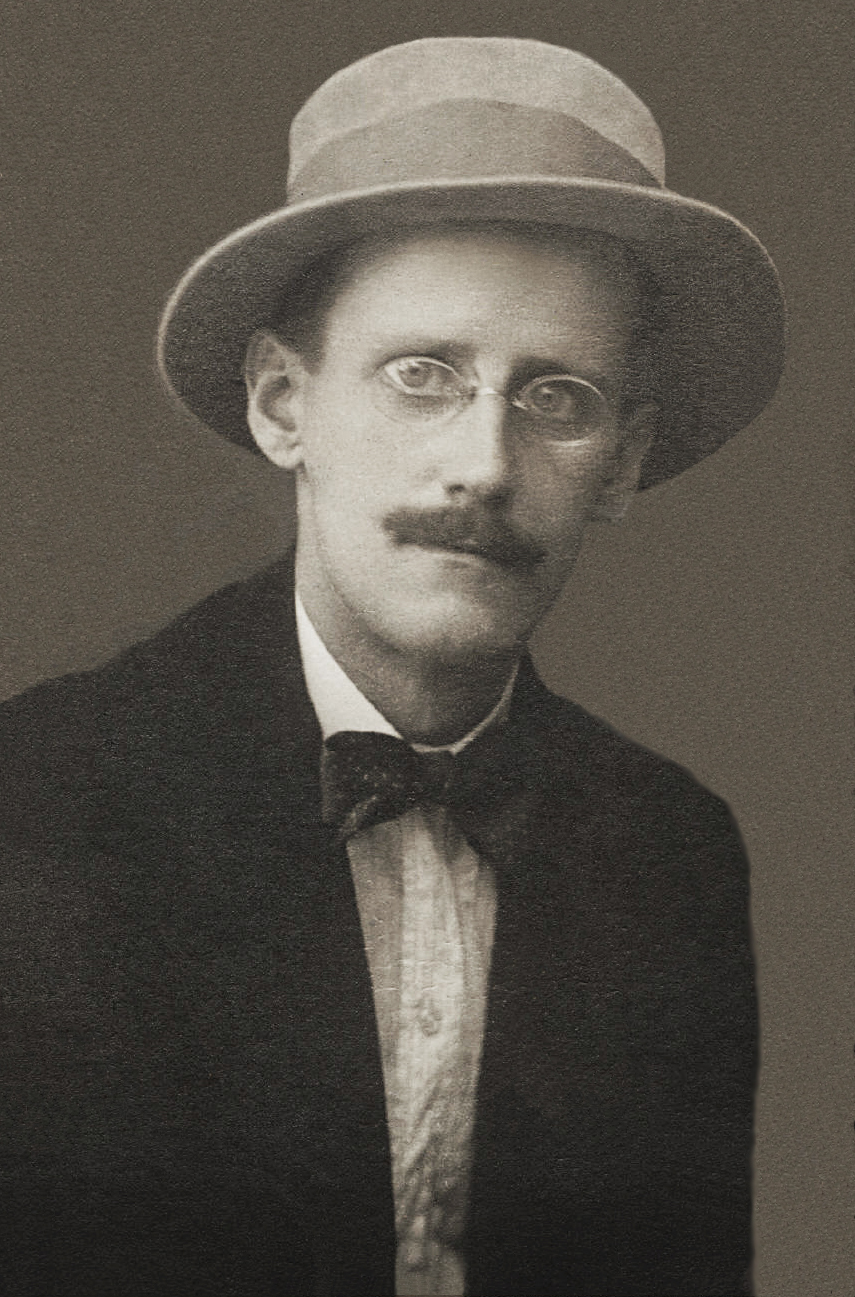
James Joyce in 1915

In late 1909, the Irish writer James Joyce wrote a series of erotic love letters to his romantic partner Nora Barnacle, including nine in December 1909 which were initially deemed too obscene for posthumous publication. Joyce and Barnacle met in Dublin in 1904 and moved to the Austro-Hungarian city of Trieste the following year, although Joyce frequently travelled for work. Joyce was in Dublin in 1909, when an acquaintance confessed that he had frequently spent time alone with Barnacle early in Joyce's relationship. Joyce initially accused Barnacle of infidelity, but was later convinced his allegations were false. After apologizing to her, Joyce began writing increasingly erotic letters to her over the following months, with the most obscene written that December. In these, expresses sadomasochistic fantasies and makes erotic references to defecation and flatulence. Barnacle's responses are no longer extant. Generally taking a sexually submissive posture in the letters, Joyce contrasts an idealised and romantic view of Barnacle with deviant imagery, often using long streams of contradictory adjectives and descriptions.

After Joyce's death in 1941, his brother Stanislaus Joyce held many of his letters. Joyce biographer Richard Ellmann discovered this collection in 1955 and negotiated exclusive publishing rights for Cornell University. He discovered the 1909 erotic letters and recommended that they be published in full, though he noted the potential for scandal if they were published without context. This was overruled by the Joyce estate, and they were published in a censored form in 1966, with two letters removed entirely. The same year, French writer Hélène Cixous published portions of the letters. Ellmann was allowed to publish the unredacted letters in the 1975 Selected Letters of James Joyce. Their publication invited widespread media attention, including reviews in the American pornographic magazines Screw and Hustler.

== Background ==
James Joyce was an Irish novelist and poet, later known for works such as Dubliners (1914), Ulysses (1922), and Finnegans Wake (1939). Born in Dublin in 1882, he first began writing while attending Belvedere College, a Jesuit secondary school. During his teenage years, he came to strongly reject his Catholic upbringing in favour of an individualistic worldview which prioritised the pursuit of pleasure. He first became sexually active in 1896 with a prostitute in Dublin; he went on to frequent brothels throughout both his secondary education and his study at the University College Dublin. After graduating from Dublin in 1902, Joyce briefly stayed in Paris, before returning to Dublin to care for his terminally ill mother. After her death in 1903, Joyce became increasingly aimless, turning to alcoholism and intermittently pursuing work as a writer while distancing himself from his family.

Nora Barnacle was born in Galway in 1884, and spent much of her childhood under the care of her grandmother. She attended a Catholic school operated by the Sisters of Mercy in her youth, afterwards finding work as a porter at a local convent. Around the beginning of 1904, she moved to Dublin to escape abuse and found work as a hotel chambermaid. In June of that year, Barnacle and Joyce arranged a meeting after a chance encounter. They went to Ringsend, a deserted area near the harbour, where Barnacle masturbated him. The two quickly fell into a romantic relationship. Four months later, with Joyce strongly critical of marriage as an institution, the two left Ireland in hopes of living together unmarried. In early 1905, the couple settled in Trieste, then part of Austria-Hungary. After they had a son in 1905 and a daughter (Lucia Joyce) in 1907, James was increasingly pressured by financial concerns, and frequently travelled in various attempts to secure money for his family.

=== Early 1909 letters ===
Joyce's letters in 1909 reached a more hostile and abrasive tone. According to his responses, Barnacle chastised his frequent consumption of alcohol and lack of income, especially taking issue with his inability to write profitable books; she did not enjoy or understand his prose, although she took a liking to his poetry. Joyce felt he had a duty to educate Barnacle, and failing this, help her understand him. Barnacle was receptive to Joyce's frequent portrayal of himself as impulsive and childish, with Joyce suggesting in the letters that he needed her as a strong, controlling presence in his life.

In June 1909, Joyce visited Dublin alongside his young son Giorgio to visit his family. While there, an acquaintance claimed that Barnacle had frequently spent time alone with him when she first began seeing Joyce. Feeling betrayed, Joyce wrote several letters to Barnacle accusing her of infidelity. Afterwards, a friend convinced him that the allegations were a lie, and he wrote again to her in apology.

== Erotic letters ==
The tone of Joyce's attested letters to Barnacle shifts in the aftermath of his false allegations of infidelity in 1909. Initially filled with penitence and remorse, they shift towards expressions of lust and passion. He adopts a childlike attitude towards Barnacle, comparing their relationship to that of a mother and her child. In one letter, he tells Barnacle that he wishes he could "nestle in your womb like a child born of your flesh and blood" and "sleep in the warm secret gloom of your body". Joyce also expresses sadomasochistic inclinations; in his letter on 2 September, he writes that he has an "idea madder than usual" and requests that Barnacle try flogging him. He briefly returned home to Trieste in September, but was soon motivated to go back to Ireland the following month, seeking to organise a cinema in Dublin. This opened as the Volta Cinematograph.

A group of nine of Joyce's letters to Barnacle after his return were especially sexual and obscene in tone. These, written on December 2nd, 3rd, 6th, 8th, 9th, 13th, 15th, 16th, and 20th, 1909, were the set not initially included in compilations of Joyce's letters until biographer Richard Ellmann's Selected Letters of James Joyce in 1975. Barnacle's replies to Joyce, possibly destroyed or lost during a move, were never published. Joyce occasionally praises sections or phrases within the unrecorded letters. Barnacle probably encouraged Joyce to write increasingly obscene content, seemingly spurred on by his request to her from his previous trip to Dublin. Joyce interspersed his romantic and erotic prose with regular news about family matters and finances. Despite the highly obscene language in the letters, Joyce was known to be reserved and avoidant of sexual topics in public life, disliking ribaldry.

=== Analysis ===
My darling Nora, I am panting with eagerness to get your replies to these filthy letters of mine. I write to you openly because I feel now that I can keep my word with you.

Don’t be angry, dear, dear, Nora, my little wild-flower of the hedges. I love your body, long for it, dream of it.

Speak to me, dear lips that I have kissed in tears. If this filth I have written insults you bring me to my senses again with the lash as you have done before. God help me!

— James Joyce, Letter of 3 December 1909

Throughout his love letters, Joyce contrasts the spiritual qualities of Barnacle and his love for her with those of lust and deviance. He uses long sequences of contrasting adjectives in the letters, calling Barnacle "my little bad-tempered bad-mannered splendid little girl" and a "proud little ignorant saucy dear warm-hearted girl". Recounting his initial sexual experience with her, he describes how she "frigged me slowly until I came off through your fingers, all the time bending over me and gazing at me out of your quiet saintlike eyes". Even his most purely obscene letters often use romantic epithets for her, such as one which opens by addressing her as "my dark-blue, rain-drenched flower". The motif of a blue flower is used to represent Barnacle throughout the letters, often in the closing statements. Literary scholar Wendy Faris attributed this to a desire to compensate for the intense expressions of lust and violence preceding it. Joyce describes his lust for and attraction to Barnacle as brutal and bestial, but contrasts this with his concurrent "spiritual love" for her.

Joyce frequently makes erotic references to defecation and flatulence, calling Barnacle his "darling brown-arsed fuckbird". He also frequently assumes a sexually submissive posture (calling himself "so small and soft") and outlines his fantasies as to how he wishes Barnacle to engage with him sexually, calling on her to "ride [him] like a man". The Joyce scholar Christine Van Boheemen-Saaf wrote in 2008 that he "relishes the vilest imagery he can conjure" to reinforce the persistent dialectic between degrading and idealizing language.

Fuck me on the stairs in the dark, like a nursery-maid fucking her soldier, unbuttoning his trousers gently and slipping her hand into his fly and fiddling with his shirt and feeling it getting wet and then pulling it gently up and fiddling with his two bursting balls and at last pulling out boldly the mickey she loves to handle and frigging it for him softly, murmuring into his ear dirty words and dirty stories that other girls told her and dirty things she said, and all the time pissing her drawers with pleasure and letting off soft warm quiet little farts behind until her own girlish cockey is as stiff as his and suddenly sticking him up in her and riding him.

— James Joyce, Letter of 8 December 1909

In a 2000 analysis, the semiologist Jean-Louis Houdebine noted the contrast between the letters' erotic and domestic registers. Joyce frequently implies that the letters should be read by night, writing that "in the cold light of day, they must seem horrible". The couple's physical separation probably contributed to the intense eroticism of the letters. Joyce appears to have masturbated during the composition of some of the letters, especially those of the 16th and 20th of December. In these, he abruptly shifts tone away from the erotica towards other subjects, implying that he had reached orgasm; in one, he cuts off mid-sentence, announcing "no need to continue!", while in the other, he writes the Italian phrase Basta per Dio! ('enough for God's sake!') and announces that the "tomfoolery" is over.

Writing in a 2013 study, the writer David Cotter theorised that Joyce's fears of cuckoldry sparked greater romantic and sexual appreciation for Barnacle, so that he "was able to feel that she was a prize, and not a burden of sympathy". Van Boheemen-Saaf writes that the letters "mark a rupture and a redoubling not only in Joyce’s relationship to Nora but also in his style of writing", with the temporary break in trust leading him to "sanctify" Barnacle, with himself in the relatively childlike and submissive role.

== Release and controversy ==
After his death in 1941, large numbers of Joyce's papers were held by his brother Stanislaus in Trieste, unknown to Joyce scholars. Stanislaus had given out only a few papers, probably keeping his collection secret in order to work on a biography of his brother (portions of which were posthumously published as My Brother's Keeper). Richard Ellmann visited Stanislaus's home after his death in 1955, and discovered the extent of his collections. In aid of Stanislaus's widow Nelly Joyce, who was struck with severe financial difficulties after his death, Ellmann arranged a sale of the papers to Cornell University; Nelly and her son were given the funds to buy a house in London, while Ellmann was able to negotiate exclusive publishing rights for the letters.

Included in the papers from Stanislaus were the erotic letters between James Joyce and Nora. Ellmann was eager to publish these in his compilations of Joyce's letters, noting that Joyce's work was often explicit and the potential for scandal if the letters were published out of context. The Joyce estate was strongly opposed to this proposal, as was Ellmann's publisher Faber & Faber, which feared a legal challenge for obscenity. Writing that he wished to respect the feelings of Joyce's family, Ellmann omitted two of the letters and redacted portions of some others from his two 1966 volumes of Letters of James Joyce, a continuation of Stuart Gilbert's 1957 volume. (Note: The letters of 2nd, 3rd, 6th, 15th, 16th, and 20th December have censored portions, while the letters of 8th and 9th December are omitted.)

In April 1966, writer Hélène Cixous published portions of the erotic letters in the French literary journal Les Lettres nouvelles, against the wishes of both Ellmann and Joyce's estate. Ellmann was subsequently able to secure permission from the estate to publish the letters in his 1975 Selected Letters of James Joyce. This publication attracted widespread attention, and the letters received reviews in the American pornographic magazines Screw and Hustler. The Screw writer mocked academics who attempted to soften Joyce's obscenities, declaring that they were made by a "very horny man who happened also to be a writer". Joyce scholar Chester G. Anderson, writing in a review of the Selected Letters in 1977, wrote that it was unclear how the "foul long letters" would affect Joyce studies: "what are we going to do about them now? Mastuprate? Laugh? Be outraged? Apologize for the Joyce who refused to apologize?"

Due to their extremely explicit content, the letters initially received limited attention from Joyce scholars, being only briefly mentioned in Mary T. Reynolds's overview of Joyce's letters in the 1984 A Companion to Joyce Studies. Among the most in-depth scholarly analyses of the letters are in an article published in L'Infini by Houdebine in 2000. A previously missing letter was sold at a Sotheby's auction in 2004. As Joyce's letters were still under copyright, Stephen James Joyce, Joyce's grandson and executor of his estate, barred its publication, describing it as an invasion of privacy.

== Notes ==
=== Bibliography ===
- Anderson, Chester G. (1977). "Review of Selected Letters of James Joyce". James Joyce Quarterly. 14 (2): 219–223. JSTOR 25476053.
- Balázs, Thomas P. (2002). "Recognizing Masochism: Psychoanalysis and the Politics of Sexual Submission in Ulysses". Joyce Studies Annual. 13: 160–191. JSTOR 26285163.
- Brockman, William S. (1999). "Learning to Be James Joyce's Contemporary? Richard Ellmann's Discovery and Transformation of Joyce's Letters and Manuscripts". Journal of Modern Literature. 22 (2): 253–263. JSTOR 3831735.
- Bulson, Eric (2006). The Cambridge Introduction to James Joyce. Cambridge University Press. doi:10.1017/CBO9780511607301. ISBN 9780511607301.
- Cotter, David (2013). Joyce and the Perverse Ideal. London: Routledge. ISBN 9781136711497.
- Ellmann, Richard, ed. (1966). Letters of James Joyce. Vol. 2. Faber & Faber. OCLC 896666101.
- Ellmann, Richard (1982) [1959]. James Joyce. Oxford University Press. ISBN 9780195031034.
- Ellmann, Richard, ed. (1975). Selected Letters of James Joyce. New York: Viking Press. ISBN 9780670631902.
- Faris, Wendy B. (1980). "The Poetics of Marriage: Flowers and Gutter Speech, Joyce's Letters to Nora". CEA Critic. 43 (1): 9–13. JSTOR 44376048.
- Federici, Annalisa (2019). "'Dear Henry'/'Dear Jim'/'My Dearest Nora': Fictional and Private Language in Joyce" (PDF). Joyce Studies in Italy. 21: 233–250.
- Houdebine, Jean-Louis (2000). "Joyce-Nora, décembre 1909". L'Infini (in French). 70: 92–100.
- Maddox, Brenda (1988). Nora: A Biography of Nora Joyce. New York: Ballantine Books. ISBN 9780749390143.
- Ní Chonchúir, Nuala (15 March 2021). "Imagining Nora Barnacle's Love Letters to James Joyce". The Paris Review.
- Peterson, Richard F.; Cohn, Alan M. (1982). "James Job: The Critical Reception of Joyce's Letters". James Joyce Quarterly. 19 (4): 429–440. JSTOR 25476467.
- Reynolds, Mary T. (1984). Bowen, Zack; Carens, James F. (eds.). A Companion to Joyce Studies. Westport: Greenwood Press. pp. 39–70.
- Van Boheemen-Saaf, Christine (2008). "The Nora Letters as a Source of Joyce's Performativity". James Joyce Quarterly. 45 (3/4): 469–479. JSTOR 30244389.

=== Further reading ===
- Baylet, John (1976). "Review of Selected Letters of James Joyce". Journal of Beckett Studies (1): 92–96.
- Henke, Suzette A. (2015). James Joyce and the Politics of Desire. London: Routledge. ISBN 9781317291930.
- Kain, Richard M. (1976). "Review of The Book as World, Selected Letters, and Forms of Modern British Fiction". Modern Fiction Studies. 22 (4): 633–637. JSTOR 26280414.
- Neill, Crispian (2016). "The Afflatus of Flatus: James Joyce and the Writing of Odor". James Joyce Quarterly. 53 (3/4): 307–326. JSTOR 45172812.
- Updike, John (1 March 1976). "Simple-Minded Jim". The New Yorker. pp. 93–100.
