= Ben Graf Henneke =

President of the University of Tulsa
- In office 1958–1967
- Preceded by: Clarence I. Pontius
- Succeeded by: Eugene Swearingen

Personal details
- Born: May 20, 1914 St. Louis, Missouri
- Died: November 13, 2009 (aged 95) Tulsa, Oklahoma
- Education: University of Tulsa; University of Iowa; University of Illinois Urbana-Champaign

Ben Graf Henneke (May 20, 1914 – November 13, 2009) was the president of the University of Tulsa ("TU"), in Tulsa, Oklahoma, United States, from 1958 to 1967. A professor of speech and theatre, he wrote an early textbook on radio announcing, and was instrumental in the creation of the university's radio station, KWGS. Henneke also wrote the TU fight song when he was an undergraduate student at the school. Henneke has been cited as one of the most influential figures in the university's history.

== Early life and education ==
Henneke was born in St. Louis, Missouri. After graduating from Tulsa Central High School, he enrolled at the University of Tulsa in 1931, with plans to become a journalist. In 1932, as a sophomore in the College of Arts and Sciences, Henneke entered a contest, sponsored by a local clothing store, for a new fight song for the school's athletic teams, the Tulsa Golden Hurricane. Henneke won the contest and a $25 prize. He had not written a song before; he later said that the opening sounds of his composition were inspired by the sounds his family's Hoover vacuum cleaner made when he performed his household chores. His winning entry, "Hurricane Spirit Song" (now also commonly known as the "Hurricane Fight Song"), remains in use today.

Henneke graduated in 1935 with a bachelor's degree in English, and later received a master's degree in theatre from the University of Iowa and a doctorate in speech from the University of Illinois Urbana-Champaign.

== Academic career ==
Offered a job with the Tulsa World after graduation, Henneke instead began teaching speech and theater at TU in 1936. He created a radio quiz show, "Going to College," which aired nationally from 1945 to 1952. Henneke was instrumental in the founding of a radio station for the university, which commenced operations in 1948 as KWGS, its initials in honor of Tulsa oilman William G. Skelly, who supplied the funding.

Henneke's textbook, the Radio Announcer's Handbook first published in 1949 and revised in 1959, was reportedly the first textbook on radio announcing. He also wrote another textbook, Reading Aloud Effectively.

Henneke became academic vice president of the university in 1953, and was named its 16th president in 1958. He was the first TU alumnus to become president of the university. He was credited with upgrading TU's faculty and academic reputation: during his tenure the university established new doctoral programs, increased the proportion of faculty with doctorates, started new publications including Petroleum Abstracts and the James Joyce Quarterly, developed a North Campus center for petroleum engineering research, and expanded many other facilities. He also initiated the university's efforts to obtain a chapter of Phi Beta Kappa; after it was chartered in 1989, Henneke was inducted as an alumni member in 1991. Also during his presidency, the university received a $34 million gift from the estate of Tulsa philanthropist J.A. Chapman, which greatly improved the school's previously difficult finances.

After his tenure as president, Henneke returned to teaching in 1967 as a professor of humanities. He retired in 1979, having spent the first 48 years of his adult life at TU as a student or faculty member. He was named TU's "president emeritus" in 1982. He continued to write and teach extensively, including numerous articles, a weekly column in the Tulsa Tribune, and a radio lecture series on KWGS. In 1990 he published a biography of 19th century actress and theatrical manager Laura Keene, best known for her production of the play Our American Cousin, which Abraham Lincoln was watching on the evening of his assassination at Ford's Theatre. One reviewer of this book commented that it would "rectify shoddy theatre history" and "re-inscribe" Keene's place in that history. Henneke also published a book-length poem entitled A Ravenna Mosaic.

Henneke married Ellen Eaves in 1940; she died in 2004. Also in 2004, his 90th birthday was honored with a proclamation by Oklahoma Governor Brad Henry naming it "Dr. Ben Graf Henneke Day". After Henneke's death in 2009, current TU president Steadman Upham commented, "No one has had a greater impact on the University of Tulsa than Ben Henneke."
