= Fritz Senn =

Swiss journalist and philologist

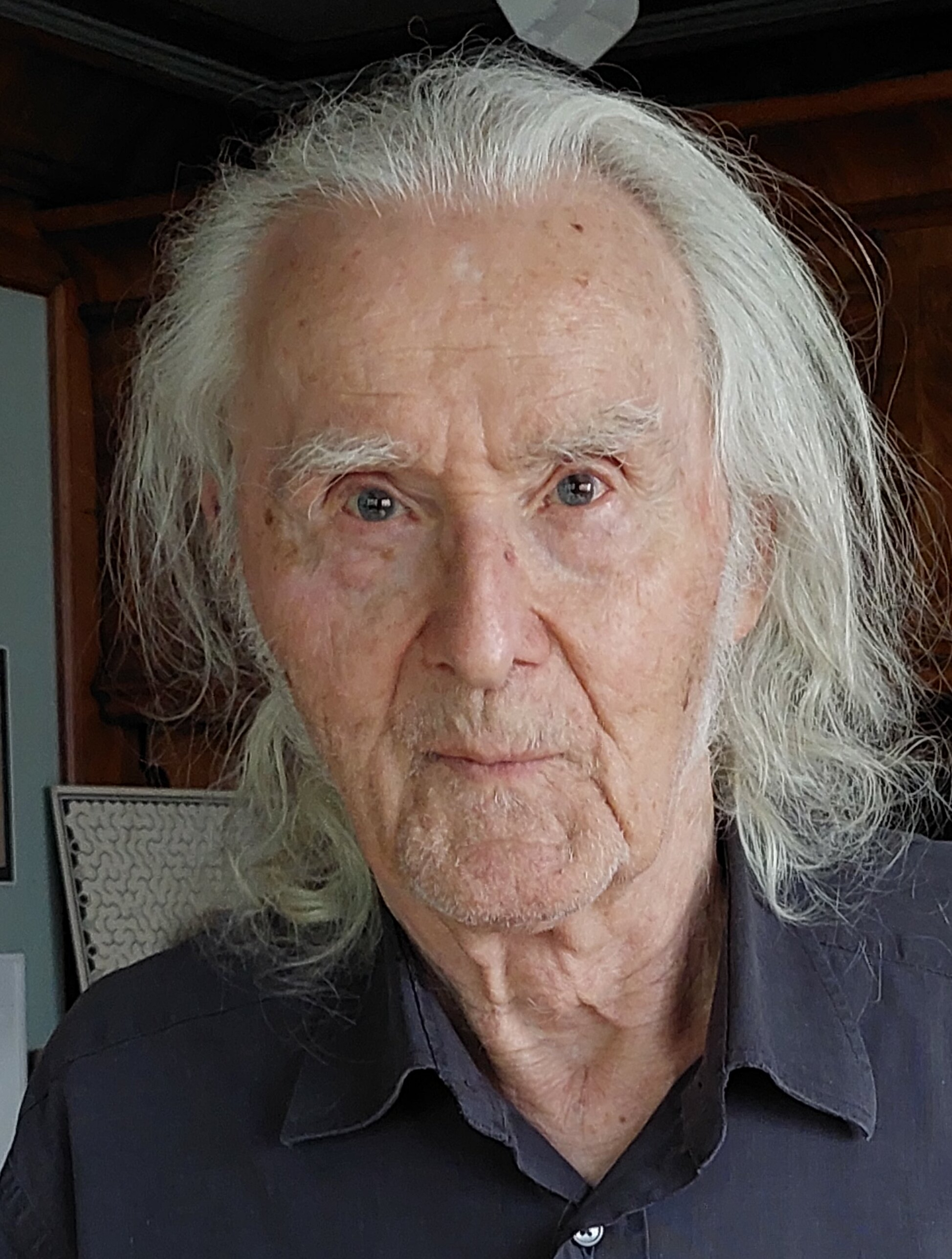
- Born: January 1, 1928 (age 98); Basel, Switzerland
- Occupations: publicist, James Joyce expert President of the International James Joyce Foundation (1977–1982); Director of the Zurich James Joyce Foundation (1985–2022)
- Writing career
- Movements: Irish literature, Modernism
- Website: joycefoundation.ch

Fritz Senn (born 1 January 1928 in Basel) is a Swiss publicist and James Joyce expert.

== Early life and education ==
Fritz Senn was born in Basel, but grew up in Zurich from 1933. He came from a humble background: his father was an unskilled laborer, his mother a cleaning lady. Senn passed the matura at the Oberrealschule in 1947 and then took up studies in English at the University of Zurich. His academic teacher Heinrich Straumann drew his attention to the work of James Joyce. For family reasons, however, Senn was unable to complete his studies.

== Career ==
He worked for many years as a proofreader in a print shop and then as an editor at Diogenes Verlag in Zürich from 1976 to 1982.

In addition to his professional work, he had been studying Joyce on his own since the early 1950s. In 1962, together with Clive Hart, he co-founded A Wake Newslitter, a journal that provided a platform for the exchange by letter of experts on Finnegans Wake. From 1963 to 1985 he was European editor of the James Joyce Quarterly, launched at the University of Tulsa. In 1967, with Bernard Benstock and Thomas F. Staley, he initiated the International James Joyce Symposium, which subsequently held conferences every two years. Together with Klaus Reichert, he compiled the seven-volume Frankfurt James Joyce Edition, published by Suhrkamp Verlag from 1969 to 1981. Senn was president of the International James Joyce Foundation from 1977 to 1982.

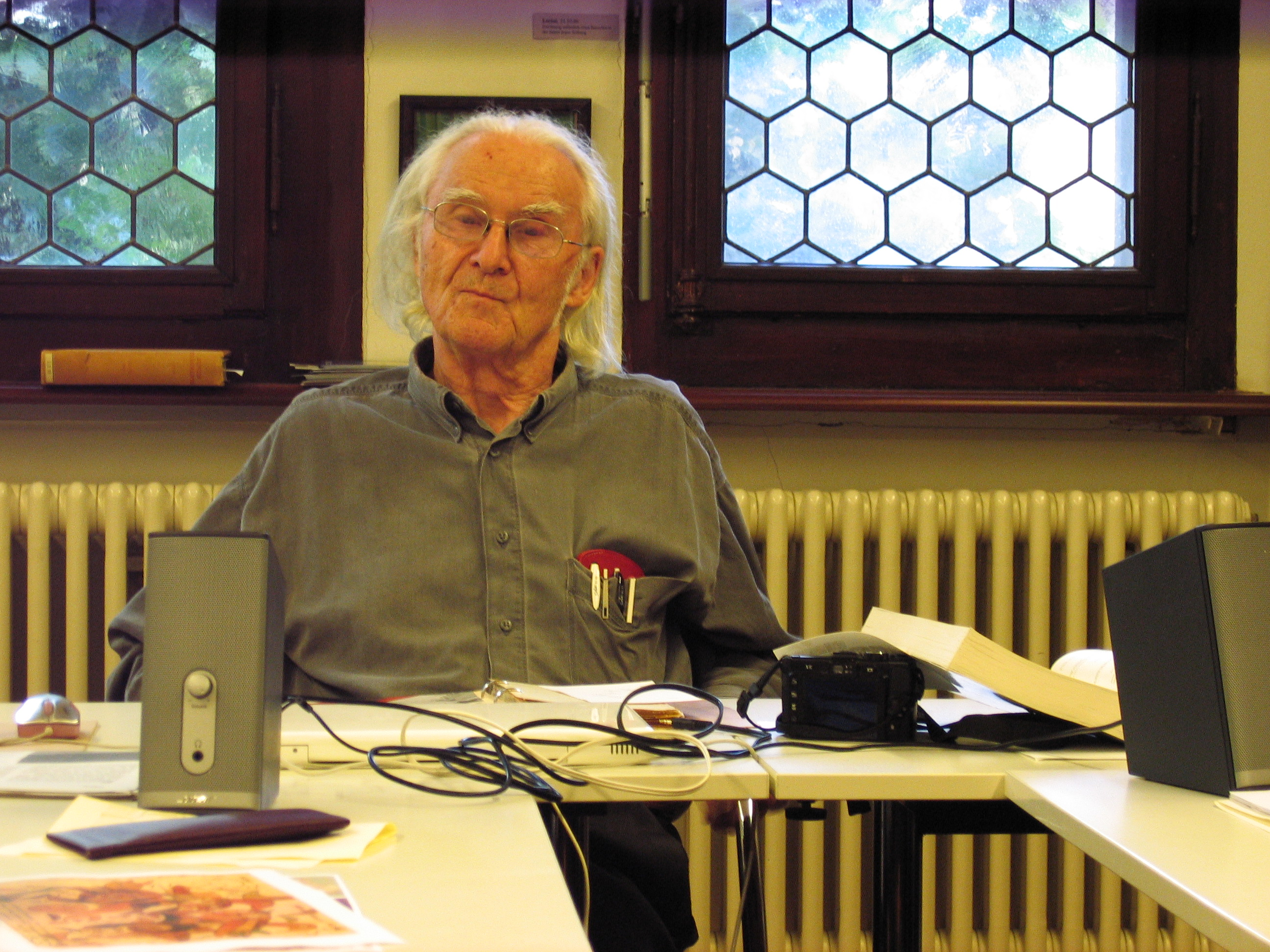
Fritz Senn at a meeting of the Finnegans Wake reading group at the Zurich James Joyce Foundation, May 2010

From 1985 to 2022, he was director of the Zurich James Joyce Foundation, which is at the same time an archive, documentation center, specialized library, and meeting place for researchers and reading groups. The establishment of the foundation was preceded by Senn's dismissal from the Diogenes publishing house in 1982. Since his direct superior Gerd Haffmanns had fallen out with the publishing house management, Senn also had to leave. He subsequently worked part-time and at low pay from 1983 to 1985 as an editor at the newly founded Haffmans Verlag. Also to prevent a sale of Senn's Joyce collection and library, the Joyce Foundation was founded with the support of, among others, the Union Bank of Switzerland and the Canton of Zürich, and Senn was appointed as its director.

Senn also shared his knowledge of Joyce in university institutions. He worked for many years as an adjunct professor at the English Department of the University of Zürich, where he taught introductory courses on Ulysses. He has also been a visiting professor at the State University of New York at Buffalo, Indiana University, Ohio State University, the University of Hawaiʻi, and the University of Delaware. Senn has also taught at the University of Zürich.

Senn was a member of the expert jury of the Zug Translators' Fellowship from 1996 to 2017.

== Personal life ==
Senn describes himself as a representative of ochlokinetics, that "cheerful science of man as a being who fundamentally stands in the way of others." He also originated the doctrine of tychomatics, the "tidings of the sovereign fumbling of fate to my disadvantage."

== Degrees ==
- Honorary doctor of the University of Cologne (1972)
- Honorary doctor of the University of Zurich (1988)
- Honorary doctor of University College Dublin (2004)

== Awards ==
- Prize of the Max Geilinger Foundation (1972)
- Johann-Jakob Bodmer prize of the City of Zürich (1998)
- Gold Medal of Honor of the Canton of Zurich (2009)
- Zürcher Festspielpreis (2014)
- Distinguished Service Award for the Irish Abroad (2023)

== Selected works ==
- Senn, Fritz (1984). Riquelme, J. P. (ed.). Joyce's dislocutions: Essays on reading as translation. Baltimore: Johns Hopkins University Press. ISBN 0801831350.
- Senn, Fritz (1984). Cavigelli, Franz (ed.). Nichts gegen Joyce. Joyce versus Nothing. Aufsätze 1959–1983. Zürich: Haffmans Velag. ISBN 978-3-251-01110-0.
- Senn, Fritz (1995). O'Neill, Christine (ed.). Inductive Scrutinies. Focus on Joyce. Dublin: Lilliput Press.
- Senn, Fritz (1999). Rathjen, Friedhelm [in German] (ed.). Nicht nur Nichts gegen Joyce. Aufsätze über Joyce und die Welt. 1969–1999. Zürich: Haffmans Verlag.
- Senn, Fritz (2007). O'Neill, Christine (ed.). Joycean Murmoirs. Fritz Senn on James Joyce. Dublin: Lilliput Press. ISBN 978-1-84351-125-0.
  - German translation: Senn, Fritz (2007). O'Neill, Christine (ed.). Zerrinnerungen. Fritz Senn zu James Joyce. Aus dem Englischen von Fritz Senn. Zürich: Verlag Neue Zürcher Zeitung. ISBN 978-3-03823-366-4.
- Senn, Fritz (2012). Noch mehr über Joyce. Streiflichter. Frankfurt am Main: Schöffling & Co. ISBN 978-3-89561-333-3.
- Senn, Fritz (2022). Ilmberger, Frances (ed.). Ulysses Polytropos. Essays on James Joyce's Ulysses by Fritz Senn. Leiden, Boston: Brill Academic Pub. ISBN 978-90-04-51670-0.

=== Editor ===
- Senn, Fritz; Reichert, Klaus, eds. (1969–1981). James Joyce: Werke. Frankfurter Ausgabe in sieben Bänden. Frankfurt am Main: Suhrkamp Verlag.
- Senn, Fritz; Begnal, Michael H., eds. (1974). A Conceptual Guide to Finnegans Wake. University Park: Pennsylvania State University Press. ISBN 978-0-271-01132-5.
- Senn, Fritz; Reichert, Klaus, eds. (1975). Materialien zu James Joyces Ein Porträt des Künstlers als junger Mann. Frankfurt am Main: Suhrkamp Verlag. ISBN 978-3-518-00776-1.
- Senn, Fritz, ed. (1979). Das James Joyce Lesebuch. Zürich: Diogenes Verlag.
- "Die feine Art sich Feinde zu machen." James Abbott McNeill Whistler im Streit mit Oscar Wilde & G.K.Chesterton. Zürich: Haffmans Verlag. 1984. (In Szene gesetzt und übersetzt von Fritz Senn).
  - Ditto. Leipzig: Reclam Verlag. 2013. ISBN 978-3-86150-613-3.
- Senn, Fritz; Reichert, Klaus, eds. (1989). Finnegans Wake Deutsch. Gesammelte Annäherungen. Frankfurt am Main: Suhrkamp Verlag. ISBN 978-3-518-11524-4.

== Filmography ==
- "The Joycean Society" (53’). Belgium. 2013. Directed by Dora García. Introduced by Aaron Schuster. (The film shows the Finnegans Wake reading group led by Fritz Senn at the Zürich James Joyce Foundation).
