= Mary Reynolds =

Mary Reynolds may refer to:

== Arts ==
- Mary Reynolds (artist) (1891–1950), American artist and bookbinder
- Mary Reynolds (landscape designer), Irish landscape designer
- Mary Aldis (playwright) (Mary Reynolds Aldis, 1872–1949), American playwright and poet
- Marilyn Miller (born Mary Ellen Reynolds; 1898–1936), American Broadway performer

== Others ==
- Lynn Carlin (born 1938), born Mary Reynolds, American former actress
- Mary Dee Reynolds, American member of industrial rock supergroup Pigface
- Mary Reynolds (baseball) (1921–1991), American baseball player
- Mary Reynolds (politician) (1889–1974), Irish politician and farmer
- Mary T. Reynolds (c. 1931–2000), American authority on James Joyce
- Mary Palmer (née Reynolds; 1716–1794), British author
- Mary Reynolds Babcock (1908–1953), American philanthropist
- Ruth Mary Reynolds (1916–1989), American educator and civil rights activist

== See also ==
- Debbie Reynolds (born Mary Francis Reynolds) (1932–2016), American actress
