= Geoffrey Orsak =

American university president (born 1963)

- Born: Geoffrey Charles Orsak; May 26, 1963 (age 63); Schenectady, New York, U.S.
- Spouse: Catherine Bohnert Orsak
- Children: 2

Academic background
- Education: Rice University B.S., M.S., PhD. (all in Electrical Engineering (E.E.)

Academic work
- Discipline: Electrical Engineer, Engineering Educator
- Institutions: George Mason University, Southern Methodist University, Tulsa University

Geoffrey Charles Orsak (born May 26, 1963) is a native of Schenectady, New York who went to Houston and entered Rice University, where he earned BS, MS and Ph.D. degrees in electrical engineering. After earning his doctorate in 1989, He joined George Mason University to teach electrical engineering as an assistant professor. In 1997, he moved to Dallas, and joined the faculty at Southern Methodist University (SMU) as Associate Professor of Electrical and Computer Engineering. In March 2004, he was named Dean of the School of Engineering and Applied Science at SMU. In 2012, he accepted an offer to become the 18th president of the University of Tulsa in Tulsa, Oklahoma. However, he was abruptly terminated, with no public explanation, only 77 days later.

== Early life and education ==
Orsak was born in Schenectady, New York. He grew up in Corpus Christi, Laredo, and San Antonio, Texas. He attended Rice University where he earned his BSEE (’85), MEE (’86) and PhD (’90) degrees. While at Rice, he was elected president of Will Rice College, one of the Rice's residential colleges.

=== George Mason University ===
Orsak began his academic career at George Mason University where he reached the level of associate professor. While there he served for a year as a Presidential Fellow, assisting the president and other senior staff with key strategic issues. He received one grant in 1991-2 of $19,102 from the National Science Foundation for a project titled "Efficient Algorithms for the Design of Systems with non-Gaussian Inputs."

=== Southern Methodist University ===
In 1997, he left GMU for Southern Methodist University (SMU), where he was hired as an associate professor of electrical and computer engineering. He became associate dean for research and development in May, 2001 and Professor of Electrical Engineering, and in March 2004, he was named dean of the School of Engineering and Applied Science, which during his tenure was renamed the Bobby B. Lyle School of Engineering.

Early in his career at SMU, Orsak began taking a critical look at the condition of engineering in the United States. He noticed that in his major field (electrical engineering (EE)) by comparing enrollments over time. On a nationwide basis, American universities and colleges had graduated nearly 25,000 EEs in 1987, but by 2000, the number of graduates had fallen to 12,600. Considering all branches of engineering, he concluded that the number of graduating engineers had fallen from 450,000 in 1982 to about 350,000 in 2000. He gave a detailed analysis of his conclusions in a guest editorial to the professional journal of the Institute for Engineering Education at SMU in 2003. (Note: Of course, there are many other comparisons that need to be considered, since the gross numbers may mask more gaps in some specialties (not all engineers are fungible).) He concluded that the country's traditional approach to technical and scientific education was unsuitable, if it wished to meet its domestic policy goals and also maintain a leading position in technology.

He established the Lyle School's first partnership with Lockheed Martin to provide the school's students with design and prototyping experiences using innovative team techniques to solve problems. He was also credited with setting up three centers and institutes:

- Caruth Institute for Engineering Education to oversee programs for increasing interest among young people (K-12 students) in pursuing engineering careers; this included Visioneering and Infinity Project activities.
- The Hunter and Stephanie Hunt Institute for Engineering and Humanity, an inter-disciplinary approach to finding economic ways to improve the standard of living for people presently living in extreme poverty.
- The Hart Center for Engineering Leadership, for practicing leadership skills through co-op and internship programs, leadership seminars and workshops, community engagement projects and mentoring relationships.

=== Tulsa University ===
After serving SMU as a dean for eight years, Orsak was appointed as the 18th president of the University of Tulsa (TU), replacing Steadman Upham, who had already announced his retirement. The appointment was announced on May 2, 2012, and became effective July 1, 2012,

Orsak was released as Tulsa's president on September 12, 2012. After serving only 74 days as President, the university announced that he had been removed, effective immediately, and simultaneously said that Executive Vice President Kevan Buck would "...manage day-to-day operations." A reason for the change was not given. Orsak expressed his disappointment about the board's decision to fire him after such a brief time as President.

=== Post-TU career ===
After his abrupt departure from Tulsa University, Orsak returned to Dallas, where he began to revive his stalled career in education, He was soon recruited as the Executive Director of the Texas Research Alliance (TRA), a non-profit effort to strengthen the research profiles of universities in north Texas. He had been a long-time supporter of STEAM education, (Note: STEAM is an acronym of Science, Technology, Engineering, Art and Math) In 1999, he was involved in promoting the Infinity Project, which was intended to increase student interest in engineering. (Note: By 2009, the Infinity Project, which identifies Orsak as one of its founders, claimed to be a leader in preparing high-tech curricula for secondary schools. It also claimed to When Highland Park Independent School District (HIPDSD) received a $5.8 million grant from the Moody Institute to set up its own Moody Innovation Institute (MII) in August, 2016, it decided to recruit Dr. Orsak as the executive director. have reached over 400 schools in 38 states.)

=== Accomplishments ===
Orsak was an early advocate for including engineering in the K-12 curriculum. With the support of Texas Instruments, in 1999 he launched the Infinity Project to promote engineering and innovation education. (Note: The Infinity Project is a joint venture of SMU and Texas Instruments Corporation. Founded in 1999, the project's stated objective was to "...Bring engineering/technology education to all High Schools." Geoffrey Orsak was shown in an August 17, 2000 slide presentation that was created as a marketing tool as one of seven authors, representing six different schools.) and female enrollment in the Lyle School of Engineering has consistently been 50% higher than the national average.

Orsak received the first award as Educator of the Year in Engineering and Science from EE Times in 2006, after joining SMU's School of Engineering. He was elected a Fellow of the IEEE in 2005, the highest recognition afforded by the electrical engineering profession. for leadership in the creation and deployment of engineering curricula technology for pre-college engineering education. He was also named a "Distinguished Lecturer of the IEEE" for his work in education and wireless communications. He has served on a number of public councils and task forces, including the National Petroleum Council. Chairman of the Board of the Da Vinci School, and invited to address congress on a number of occasions. He was author of a monthly column for the international magazine "Design News" from June 2008 through April 2012. He has also appeared in numerous stories in the media on education and innovation in sources such as USA Today, Discovery Channel, MSNBC, CBS Early Show, AIArchitect, Austin American Statesmen and Dallas Morning News. In 2011, Orsak received the "SMU M Award," the university's highest award.

== Personal life ==
Orsak is married to Catherine Cecil Orsak, who is a professor of psychiatry at the University of Texas Southwestern Medical Center at Dallas. They have two children, Mary Orsak, and Peter Orsak. His father was Charles "Chuck" E. Orsak. (Note: Family members have been identified from the obituary of his brother, Charles E. Orsak, who died on November 3, 2012, in Dallas.)
