= Functionally graded material =

In materials science

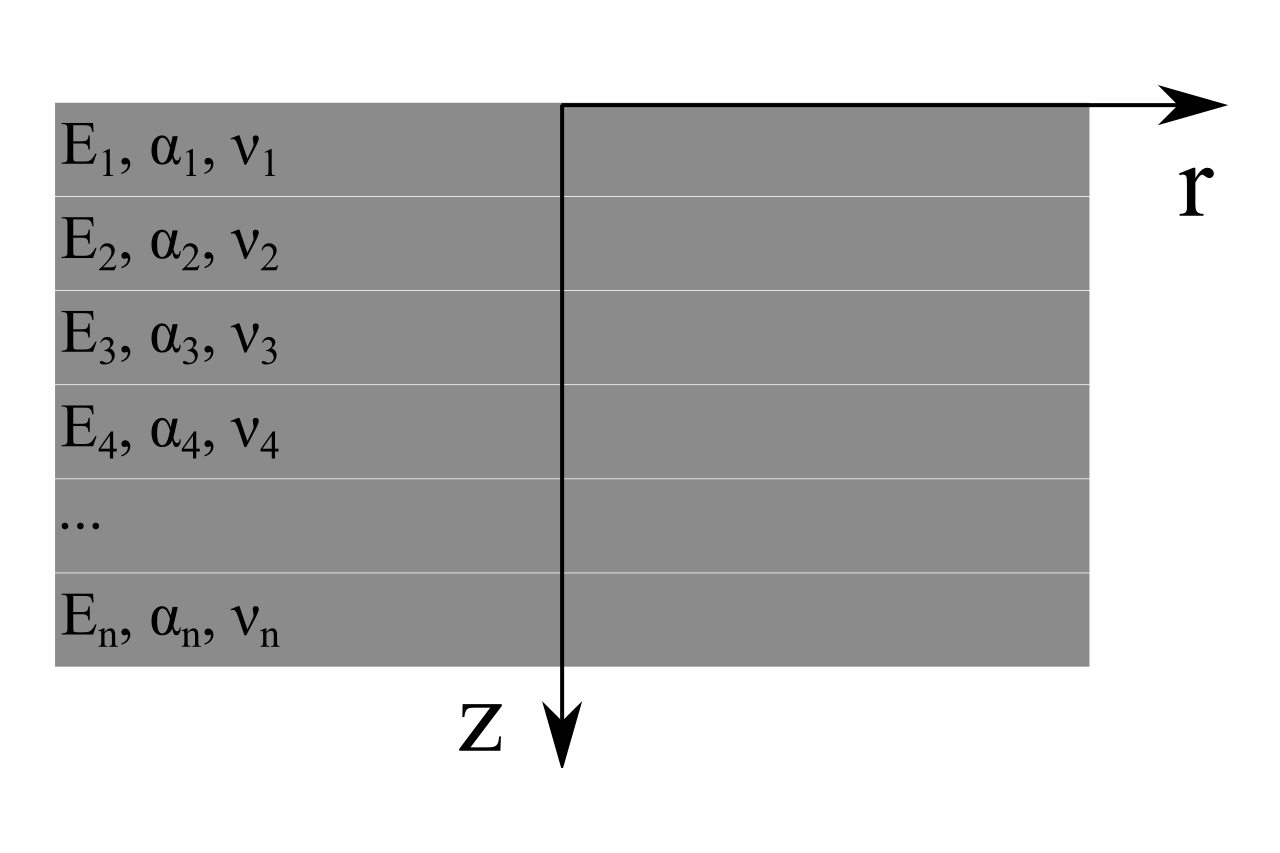
Segmented functionally graded material

In materials science Functionally Graded Materials (FGMs) may be characterized by the variation in composition and structure gradually over volume, resulting in corresponding changes in the properties of the material. The materials can be designed for specific function and applications. Various approaches based on the bulk (particulate processing), preform processing, layer processing and melt processing are used to fabricate the functionally graded materials.

== History ==
The concept of FGM was first considered in Japan in 1984 during a space plane project, where a combination of materials used would serve the purpose of a thermal barrier capable of withstanding a surface temperature of 2000 K and a temperature gradient of 1000 K across a 10 mm section. In recent years this concept has become more popular in Europe, particularly in Germany. A transregional collaborative research center (SFB Transregio) is funded since 2006 in order to exploit the potential of grading monomaterials, such as steel, aluminium and polypropylen, by using thermomechanically coupled manufacturing processes.

== General information ==
FGMs can vary in either composition and structure, for example, porosity, or both to produce the resulting gradient. The gradient can be categorized as either continuous or discontinuous, which exhibits a stepwise gradient.

There are several examples of FGMs in nature, including bamboo and bone, which alter their microstructure to create a material property gradient. In biological materials, the gradients can be produced through changes in the chemical composition, structure, interfaces, and through the presence of gradients spanning multiple length scales. Specifically within the variation of chemical compositions, the manipulation of the mineralization, the presence of inorganic ions and biomolecules, and the level of hydration have all been known to cause gradients in plants and animals.

The basic structural units of FGMs are elements or material ingredients represented by maxel. The term maxel was introduced in 2005 by Rajeev Dwivedi and Radovan Kovacevic at Research Center for Advanced Manufacturing (RCAM). The attributes of maxel include the location and volume fraction of individual material components.

A maxel is also used in the context of the additive manufacturing processes (such as stereolithography, selective laser sintering, fused deposition modeling, etc.) to describe a physical voxel (a portmanteau of the words 'volume' and 'element'), which defines the build resolution of either a rapid prototyping or rapid manufacturing process, or the resolution of a design produced by such fabrication means.

The transition between the two materials can be approximated by through either a power-law or exponential law relation:

Power Law: $E=E_oz^k$ where $E_o$ is the Young's modulus at the surface of the material, z is the depth from surface, and k is a non-dimensional exponent ($0<k<1$).

Exponential Law: $E=E_oe^{\alpha z}$ where $\alpha <0$ indicates a hard surface and $\alpha >0$ indicates soft surface.

== Applications ==
There are many areas of application for FGM. The concept is to make a composite material by varying the microstructure from one material to another material with a specific gradient. This enables the material to have the best of both materials. If it is for thermal, or corrosive resistance or malleability and toughness both strengths of the material may be used to avoid corrosion, fatigue, fracture and stress corrosion cracking.

There is a myriad of possible applications and industries interested in FGMs. They span from defense, looking at protective armor, to biomedical, investigating implants, to optoelectronics and energy.

The aircraft and aerospace industry and the computer circuit industry are very interested in the possibility of materials that can withstand very high thermal gradients. This is normally achieved by using a ceramic layer connected with a metallic layer.

The Air Vehicles Directorate has conducted a Quasi-static bending test results of functionally graded titanium/titanium boride test specimens which can be seen below. The test correlated to the finite element analysis (FEA) using a quadrilateral mesh with each element having its own structural and thermal properties.

Advanced Materials and Processes Strategic Research Programme (AMPSRA) have done analysis on producing a thermal barrier coating using Zr02 and NiCoCrAlY. Their results have proved successful but no results of the analytical model are published.

The rendition of the term that relates to the additive fabrication processes has its origins at the RMRG (Rapid Manufacturing Research Group) at Loughborough University in the United Kingdom. The term forms a part of a descriptive taxonomy of terms relating directly to various particulars relating to the additive CAD-CAM manufacturing processes, originally established as a part of the research conducted by architect Thomas Modeen into the application of the aforementioned techniques in the context of architecture.

Gradient of elastic modulus essentially changes the fracture toughness of adhesive contacts.

Additionally, there has been an increased focus on how to apply FGMs to biomedical applications, specifically dental and orthopedic implants. For example, bone is an FGM that exhibits a change in elasticity and other mechanical properties between the cortical and cancellous bone. It logically follows that FGMs for orthopedic implants would be ideal for mimicking the performance of bone. FGMs for biomedical applications have the potential benefit of preventing stress concentrations that could lead to biomechanical failure and improving biocompatibility and biomechanical stability. FGMs in relation to orthopedic implants are particularly important as the common materials used (titanium, stainless steel, etc.) are stiffer and thus pose a risk of creating abnormal physiological conditions that alter the stress concentration at the interface between the implant and the bone. If the implant is too stiff it risks causing bone resorption, while a flexible implant can cause stability and the bone-implant interface. Numerous FEM simulations have been carried out to understand the possible FGM and mechanical gradients that could be implemented into different orthopedic implants, as the gradients and mechanical properties are highly geometry specific.

An example of a FGM for use in orthopedic implants is carbon fiber reinforcement polymer matrix (CRFP) with yttria-stabilized zirconia (YSZ). Varying the amount of YSZ present as a filler in the material, resulted in a flexural strength gradation ratio of 1.95. This high gradation ratio and overall high flexibility shows promise as being a supportive material in bone implants. There are quite a few FGMs being explored using hydroxyapatite (HA) due to its osteoconductivity which assists with osseointegration of implants. However, HA exhibits lower fracture strength and toughness compared to bone, which requires it to be used in conjunction with other materials in implants. One study combined HA with alumina and zirconia via a spark plasma process to create a FGM that shows a mechanical gradient as well as good cellular adhesion and proliferation.

== Modeling and simulation ==
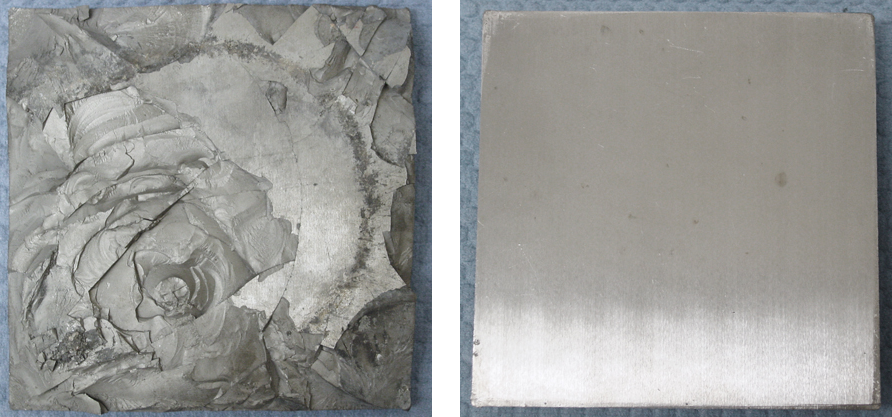
Functionally graded armor tile after ballistic testing (front and back)

Numerical methods have been developed for modelling the mechanical response of FGMs, with the finite element method being the most popular one. Initially, the variation of material properties was introduced by means of rows (or columns) of homogeneous elements, leading to a discontinuous step-type variation in the mechanical properties. Later, Santare and Lambros developed functionally graded finite elements, where the mechanical property variation takes place at the element level. Martínez-Pañeda and Gallego extended this approach to commercial finite element software. Contact properties of FGM can be simulated using the Boundary Element Method (which can be applied both to non-adhesive and adhesive contacts). Molecular dynamics simulation has also been implemented to study functionally graded materials. M. Islam studied the mechanical and vibrational properties of functionally graded Cu-Ni nanowires using molecular dynamics simulation.

Mechanics of functionally graded material structures was considered by many authors. However, recently a new micro-mechanical model is developed to calculate the effective elastic Young modulus for graphene-reinforced plates composite. The model considers the average dimensions of the graphene nanoplates, weight fraction, and the graphene/ matrix ratio in the Representative Volume Element. The dynamic behavior of this functionally graded polymer-based composite reinforced with graphene fillers is crucial for engineering applications.
