= Rick Dickson =

College athletics director (born 1954)

Biographical details
- Born: June 14, 1954 (age 72)
- Education: University of Tulsa

Playing career
- 1972–1976: Tulsa
- Position: Defensive back

Administrative career (AD unless noted)
- 1990–1994: Tulsa
- 1994–2000: Washington State
- 2000–2015: Tulane
- 2020–2024: Tulsa

Rick Dickson (born June 14, 1954) is an American former sports administrator and former interim president of the University of Tulsa. He previously served as the athletic director at University of Tulsa, and at Tulane University from 2000 through 2015. After taking over in 2000, Tulane teams have since won nine Conference USA Championships. They have advanced to NCAA postseason play 15 times (counting three NCAA Tournament appearances each by the Green Wave women's basketball and men's tennis teams). Tulane advanced to the College World Series in 2001 and 2005. During his administration the Tulane Green Wave became a member of the American Athletic Conference, leaving Conference USA.

Dickson is a graduate of Bishop Kelley High School in Tulsa, Oklahoma and the University of Tulsa. Prior to Tulane, he was athletic director for six years at Washington State University in Pullman. The Cougars played in their first Rose Bowl in 67 years in January 1998.

Dickson announced his retirement in April 2024. On June 18, 2025, it was announced that Dickson would be the University of Tulsa's interim president. He served as interim president for one year before the university hired Stacy Leeds as its president.

== See also ==
- Scott Cowen
