= Collegian =

A collegian may be:

- a member of a college
- One of the Collegians or Collegiants, a religious sect founded in Holland in 1619
- an inmate in a prison (slang)

== See also ==
- The Collegian (disambiguation), name of several college and school newspapers
- Old Collegians (disambiguation)
