= Zurich James Joyce Foundation =

Organization promoting the memory of Joyce's stay in Zürich

- Zürcher James Joyce-Stiftung

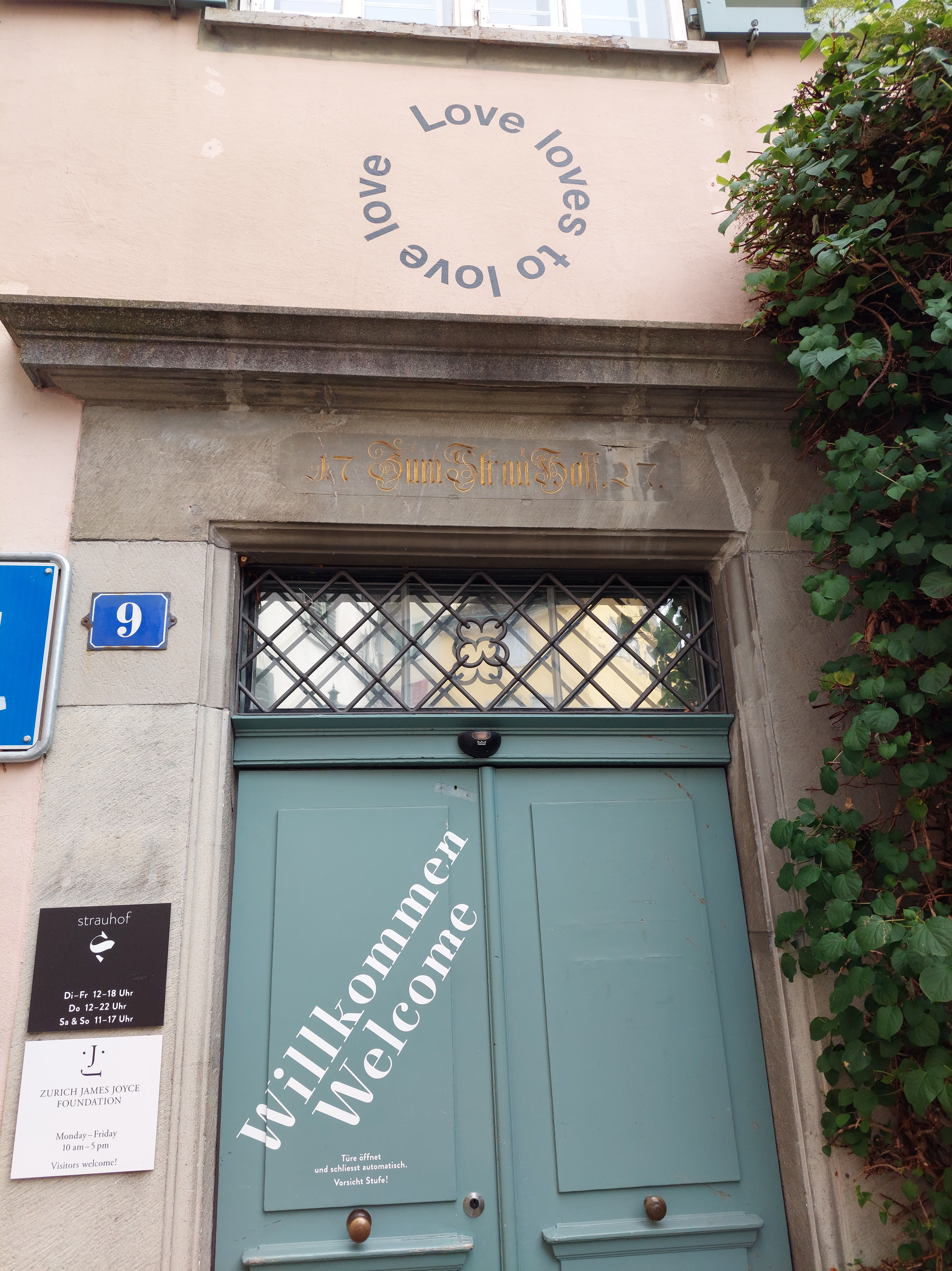
- Above the front door is a quote from James Joyce's novel Ulysses (1922): "Love loves to love love"
- Established: 9 May 1985
- Location: Augustinergasse 9, Strauhof, Zurich 8001, Switzerland
- Coordinates: 47.3716944°N 8.5400306°E
- Visitors: 2,000–3,000 per year
- Founders: Renée Wolf; Robert Holzach; Canton of Zurich
- Director: Martin Mühlheim
- Curator: Ursula Zeller
- Website: joycefoundation.ch

The Zurich James Joyce Foundation (ZJJF; German: Zürcher James Joyce-Stiftung) cultivates the memory of the life and work of the Irish writer James Joyce as well as his special relationship with Zurich, where he spent decisive years of his life, died in 1941 and was buried.

Created in 1985 on the basis of the private collection of the eminent Swiss Joycean scholar Fritz Senn, who was the Foundation's permanent head until 2022, it is an archive, documentation center, specialized library, literary museum, as well as a meeting place for researchers and reading groups, and has established itself as an essential European Joyce research site through numerous scholarly activities.

The Foundation is a leading European center for the study of the biography and creative heritage of the classics of modernist literature.

== History ==
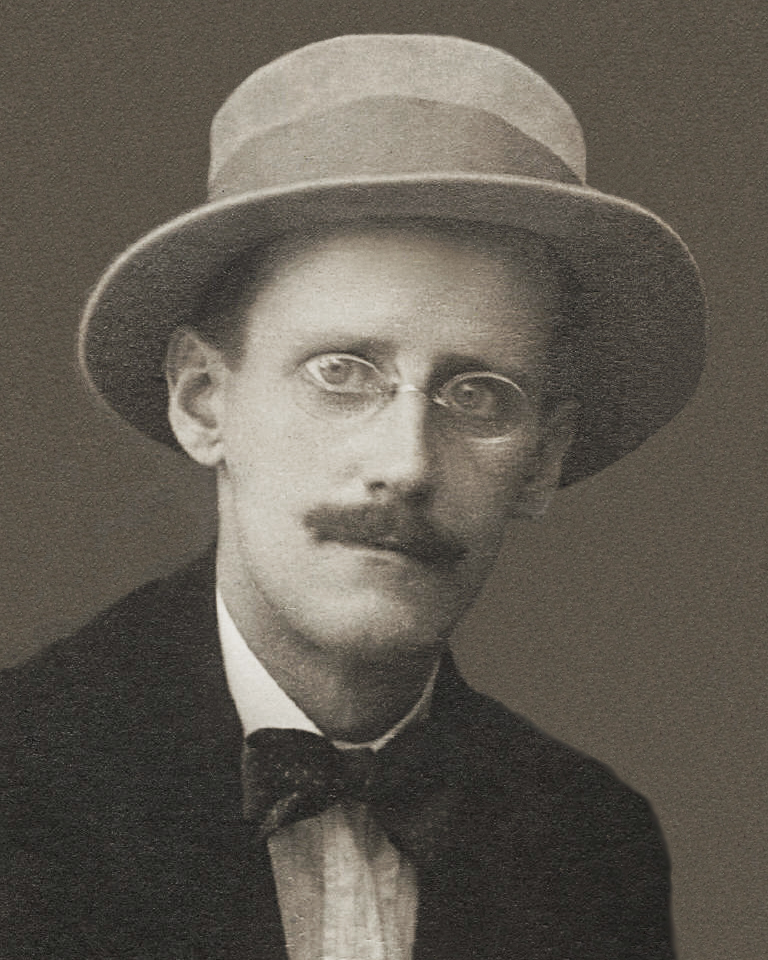
James Joyce. A portrait by Alex Ehrenzweig. Zürich, 1915

The Foundation was created on May 9, 1985, based on an idea by Renée Wolf in collaboration with Robert Holzach, then chairman of the Board of Directors of Union Bank of Switzerland (UBS). UBS covered the costs for the first six years. In addition, various Zurich companies and the Canton of Zurich made a financial contribution. Today, the foundation is more or less financially independent.

During its founding phase, the James Joyce Foundation was located in Zurich's Old Town (Altstadt) at Augustinergasse 28, before moving in March 1989 to the third floor of the Strauhof Literature House at Augustinergasse 9 — thus remaining within the historic center of Zurich, in close proximity to Zürich's main street, Bahnhofstrasse.

Until 2022, the actual originator of the Foundation, Fritz Senn, acted as its permanent head. Through the long-term efforts of Zenn and the Foundation's curators, Ruth Frehner (1985 to 2024) and Ursula Zeller (1990 to 2024), who are responsible for developing the content and concept of the Foundation's activities, as well as for the realization of its various projects (exhibitions, publications, commemorative and celebratory events), the Foundation has become the main center of European Joyce studies. From 2022 to 2024, Frehner and Zeller, succeeding Senn as head of the Foundation, temporarily led the organization as managing directors. In 2024, Swiss philologist and historian Martin Mülheim, a research assistant at the English Department of the University of Zurich, became the Foundation's director.

== Activities ==
At present, the Foundation does not simply position itself as a museum or library, but actively promotes the work of James Joyce through exhibitions, thematic events, seminars, symposia and publications. Another important task of the Foundation is to reduce the reading public's fear of Joyce, traditionally categorized as a "difficult" author. To this end, the Foundation supports the regular work of three reading groups to study his major novels, Ulysses and Finnegans Wake.

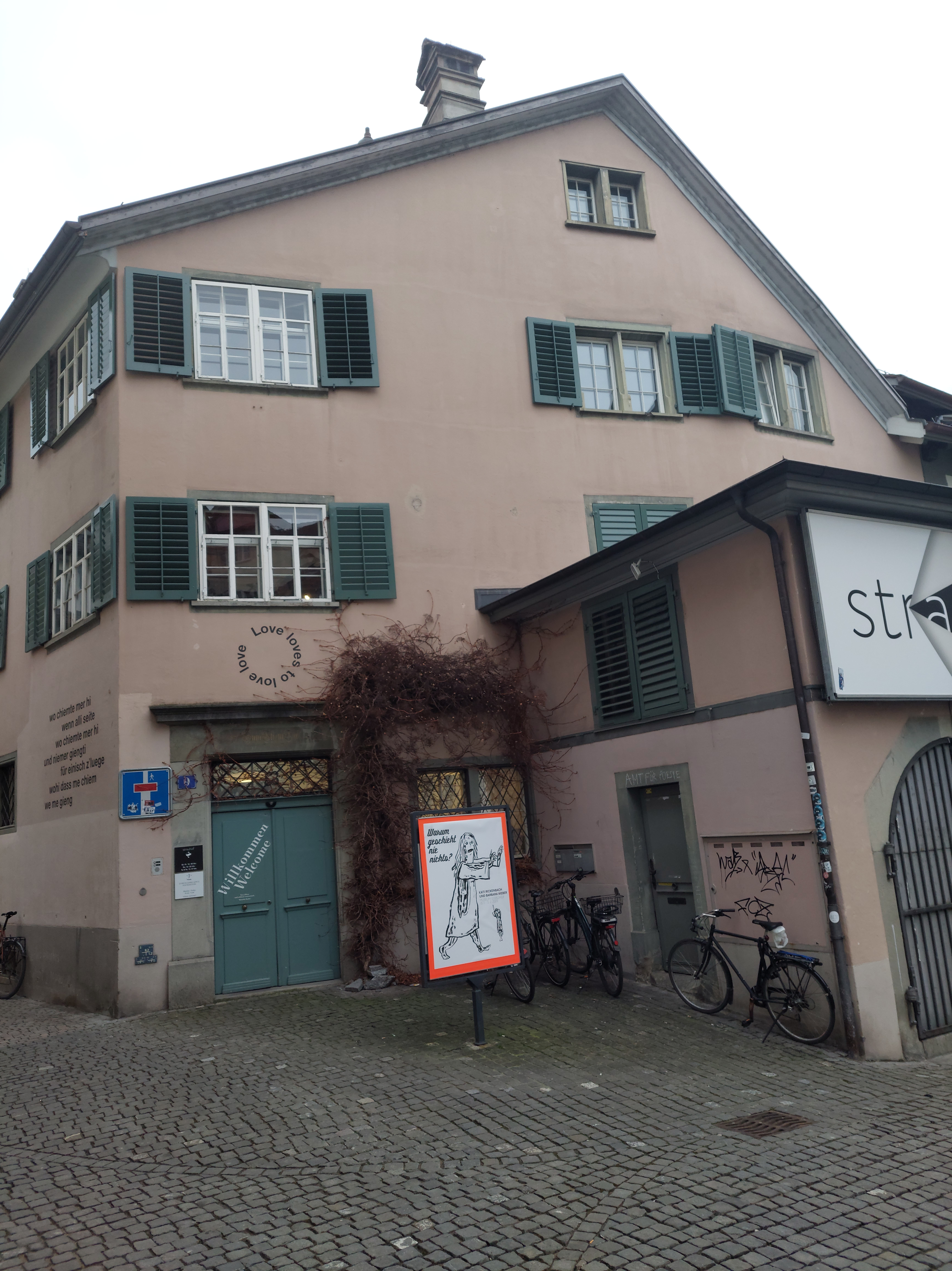
General view

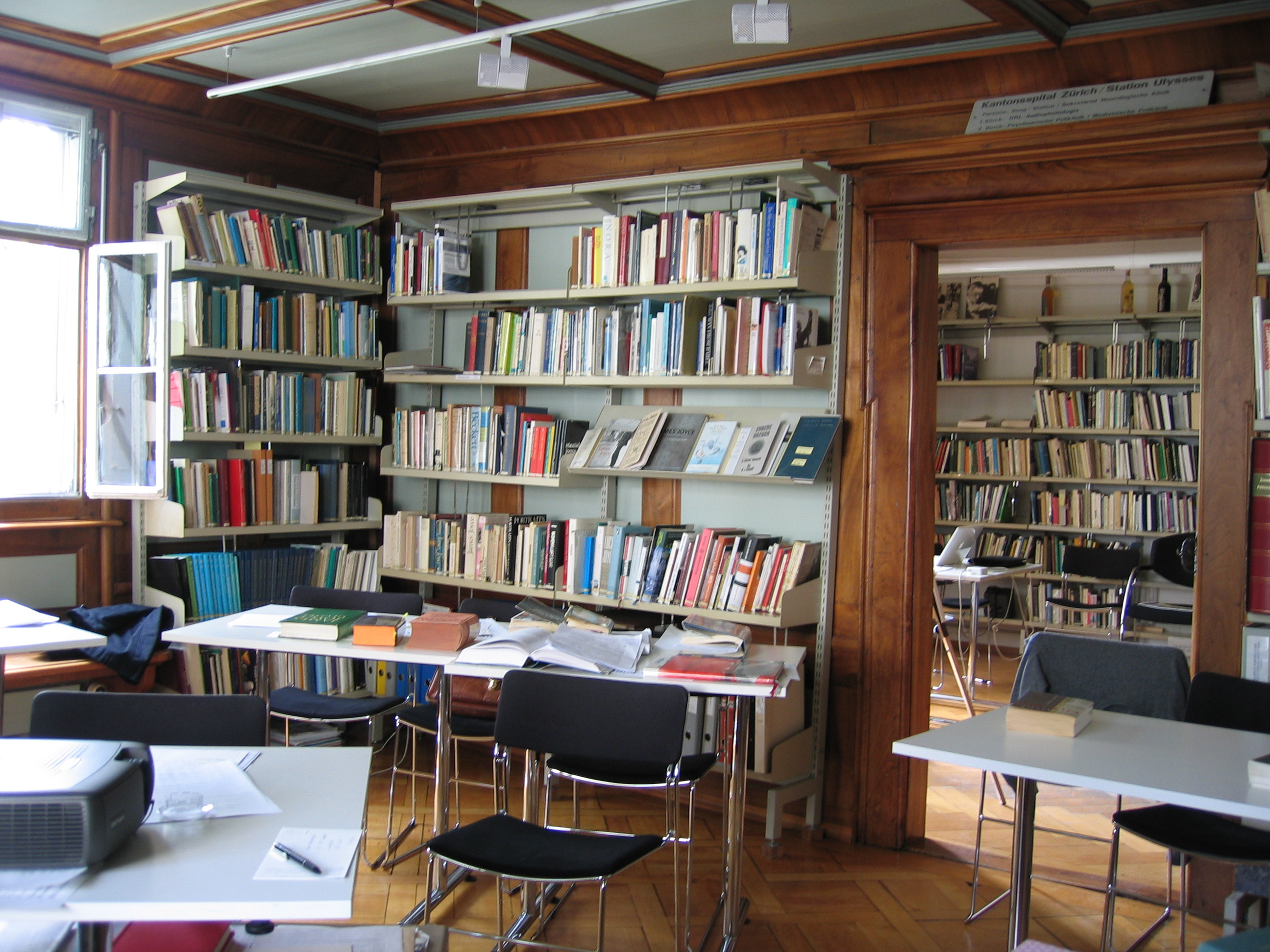
Library

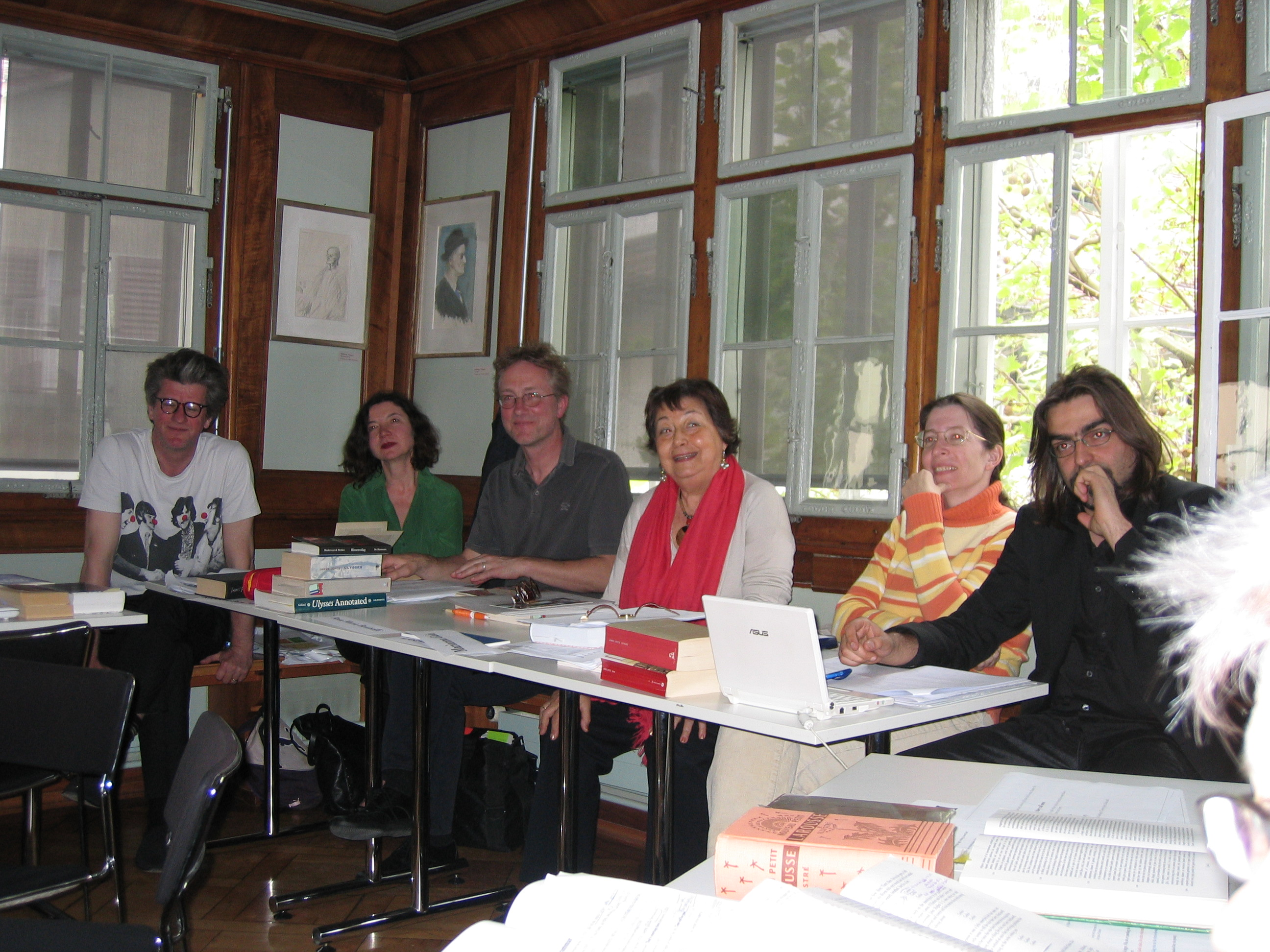
Translators workshop

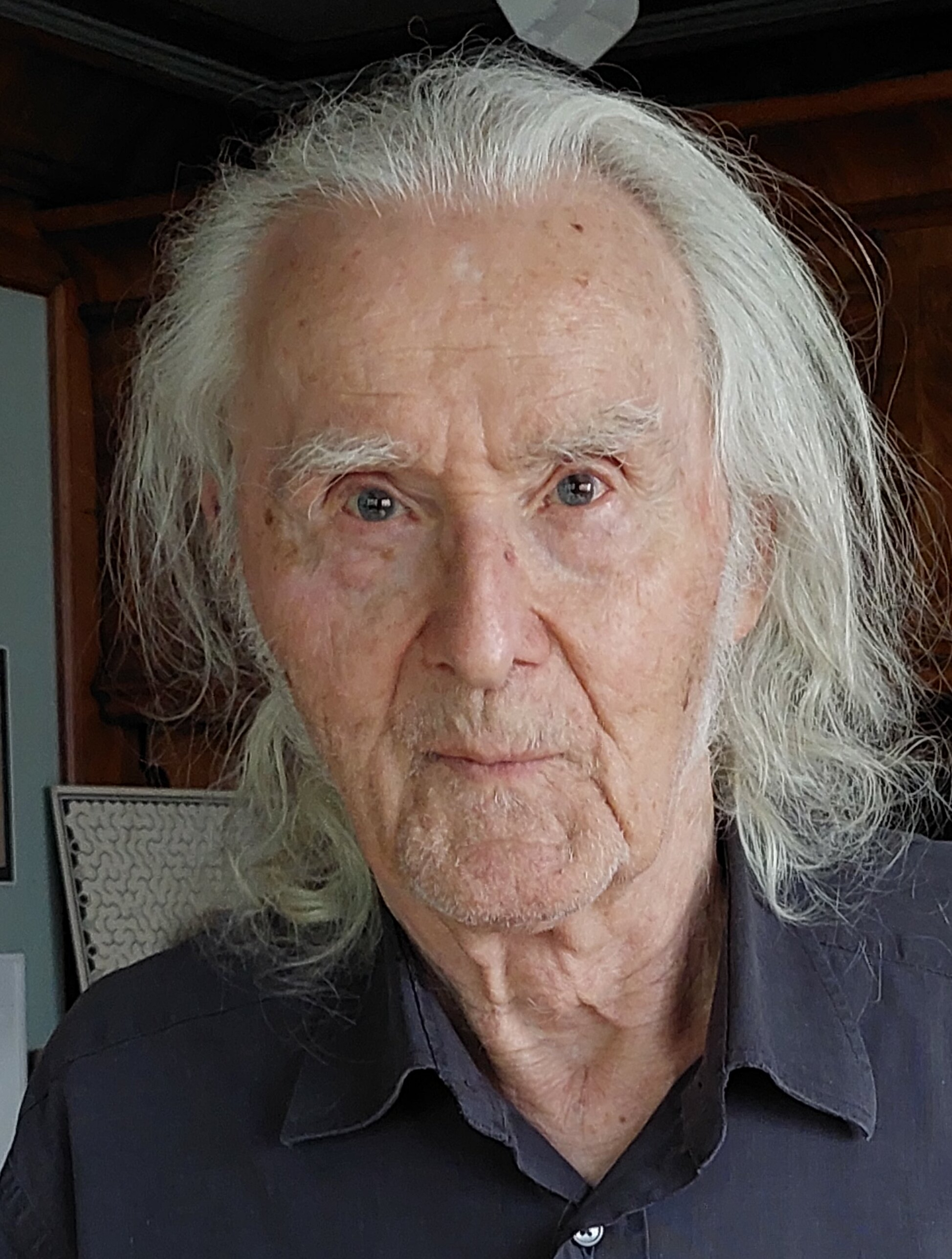
Fritz Senn

== Collection ==
The Foundation has the largest collection of books and exhibits related to the name and works of James Joyce in continental Europe. The core of the collection is the thematic library, which has about 250 meters of bookshelves and contains about 7,000 book titles, including editiones principes of Joyce's works from different years, numerous illustrated and collector's editions. In addition to primary and secondary literature, the Foundation has autographs, original editions, letters, photographs, gramophone records, posters, special magazines and publications, audio, video and DVD recordings of Joyce's works, documentary films about Joyce, as well as authentic relics, including one of the writer's two posthumous masks, two of his walking sticks, a tie and a suitcase.

In total, the Foundation's collection comprises some 400 volumes of original works, 700 volumes of translations, 2,800 volumes of secondary literature on Joyce, 3,200 volumes of reference works and other primary and secondary literature. In addition, there are nearly 200 autographs (nearly half of which are Joyce's own), nearly 600 sound recordings, 50 video and DVDs, 100 volumes of photographic newsreels, hundreds of posters and other visual materials, and thousands of individual exhibits.

== Friends of the Zurich James Joyce Foundation ==
In 1987, the Society of Friends of the Zurich James Joyce Foundation (German: Verein der Freunde der Zürcher James Joyce-Stiftung) was established to provide ideological and financial support to the ZJJF. The main task of the organisation is to provide short-term grants to enable Joyce scholars from other countries to search the Foundation's collection for one or two months. In addition, the Society sponsors the Strauchof Lectures (German: Strauhof-Vorträge) under the auspices of the Foundation, assists the Foundation with the organization of the annual Zurich Bloomsday celebrations, and collects voluntary donations for the publication of books and other Foundation projects.

== Sources ==
- Fischer, Andreas (2020). "Zurich James Joyce Foundation". James Joyce in Zurich: A Guide. Palgrave Macmillan. ISBN 978-3-030-51282-8.
- Weninger, Robert (2009). "The Institualization of 'Joyce': James Joyce in (West) Germany, Austria and Switzerland, 1945 to the Present". In Learnout, Geert; Van Mierlo, Wim (eds.). Germany, Northern and East Central Europe. The Reception of James Joyce in Europe. Vol. 1. Bloomsbury Publishing. p. 66. ISBN 978-1-847-14601-4.
