= Old Collegians =

Old Collegians may refer to former pupils of various colleges.

It may also refer to clubs associated with old pupils of a college, such as:

- Old Collegians Rugby Club, a rugby union club in Adelaide, South Australia
- Scotch Old Collegians Football Club, an Australian rules football club in South Australia
- St Patrick's Old Collegians Football Club, an Australian rules football Club in Tasmania

== See also ==
- Collegian (disambiguation)
