= Steadman Upham =

American university president (1949–2017)

- Born: April 4, 1949
- Died: July 30, 2017 (aged 68); Tulsa, Oklahoma, U.S.
- Education: Anthropology, Archaeology
- Alma mater: Arizona State University, University of Redlands
- Occupations: Archaeologist, anthropologist, educator, professor; university administrator and President of University of Tulsa
- Years active: 1980–2016
- Children: 2

Steadman Upham (April 4, 1949 – July 30, 2017) was an American archaeologist and university administrator who served as president of Claremont Graduate University from 1998 to 2004 and the University of Tulsa (TU) from 2004 to 2016. Prior to this time, he was vice provost for research and dean of the Graduate School and professor of archaeology at the University of Oregon. Many of the students at TU fondly called him, "Uncle Stead." Upham was a widely published archaeologist, having written or edited 10 books and more than 75 book chapters and journal articles. He lectured extensively in the United States and Canada. While at TU, he held a concurrent appointment as professor in the Department of Anthropology.

On April 12, 2011, Upham announced his intention to retire as president of TU, effective June 30, 2012. He was replaced by Geoffrey Orsak, former dean of the Lyle School of Engineering at Southern Methodist University. When Orsak was dismissed from the university after only 74 days in office, Upham returned to serve again as president. He retired in 2016, but said he planned to return to teaching at TU. Unfortunately, he unexpectedly died from complications of surgery in 2017.

== Education ==
Upham's undergraduate work resulted in his earning the Bachelor of Arts degree in English Literature and Spanish Language from the University of Redlands in Redlands, California . (Note: Graduation date needed) Upham then went to Claremont Graduate University, a doctoral research university and a member of the Oxford-style consortium known as the Claremont Colleges in Claremont, California, where he served as president and chief executive officer from 1998 to 2004.

Upham received his Ph.D. in anthropology in 1980 from Arizona State University. In 1981, he joined New Mexico State University, where he held the positions of chief archaeologist and assistant professor of archaeology. He attained the rank of tenured professor of archaeology in 1989. Before leaving New Mexico State in 1990, he also served as the faculty affiliate, Center for Social Research (1985–1990); curator of Archaeology, University Museum (1984–1990); and associate dean of the Graduate School (1987–1990).

From 1990 to 1998, Upham worked at the University of Oregon (UO) as vice provost for research and dean of the Graduate School and professor of anthropology. At UO, he was responsible for management of the university's 21 research centers and institutes, as well as the River Front Research Park. He also served as the university's Chief Administrator for Graduate Education.

In 2001, Upham received the Academy Gold Medal of Honor by the Academy of Transdisciplinary Learning and Advance Studies. He was named to the Graduate College Hall of Fame by Arizona State University and named an ASU Distinguished Alumnus in 1998. The University of Oregon presented Upham its Martin Luther King Jr. Award and Director's Award for Service and Achievement, both in 1998. Early in his academic career, Upham's teaching skills were recognized by New Mexico State University, which presented him the Donald C. Roush Award for Excellence in Teaching, 1987, and a year later named him a Master Teacher.

== President of the University of Tulsa ==
Steadman Upham joined The University of Tulsa as president in 2004. His administration has been highlighted by strengthening academic quality of students and faculty, maintaining strong enrollment, and facilities expansion.

Upham was called back to the presidency by the TU Board of Trustees on October 1, 2012. He had the distinction of being University of Tulsa's 17th and 19th presidents. In April 2016, Upham sent an email to students informing them of his retirement. By May 4, 2016, his replacement had been decided. He has been credited with the following major accomplishments during his two terms at TU:

- Presided over the Embrace the Future fund-raising campaign (which ran from 2004 to 2011 and raised 698 million dollars to support multiple goals;
- Led the True Blue Neighbors initiative, partnering with the Kendall-Whittier neighborhood and multiple service organizations and which continues as TU's vehicle for community improvement; (Note: Kendall-Whittier was an underserved low-income area of Tulsa near the TU campus;)
- Negotiated a partnership with the City of Tulsa to manage the Gilcrease Museum, beginning in 2008, and is still continuing;
- Established the Helmerich Center for American Research, located in the Gilcrease Museum Complex;
- Represented the Helmerich Center in its acquisition of the Bob Dylan Archive.

== Death ==
On July 30, 2017, Upham died from complications following hip surgery. He was 68. He was survived by his wife, Peggy, their son, Nathan, their daughter, Erin Upham, her husband, Alejandro Lopez and grandchildren, Orion and Aadrock.

== Awards and honors ==
- Arizona State University Graduate College Hall of Fame (1998)
- Oklahoma Hall of Fame (2015)
- New Mexico State University Donald C. Roush Award for Excellence in Teaching, (1987)
- New Mexico State University Master Teacher (1988)
- Tulsan of the Year award from Tulsa People magazine (2015)

=== Professional Services ===
Upham's professional service includes serving as commissioner of the Western Association of Schools and Colleges; chairman of the Board of Directors of the Council of Graduate Schools; president of the National Physical Science Consortium; director of The American Mutual Funds; director of the St. Francis Health System; director of the Tulsa Chamber of Commerce; director of the American Council on Education; director of the National Collegiate Athletic Association (NCAA); and member of the Fund for the Improvement of Postsecondary Education National Board.

== See also ==
- List of presidents of the University of Tulsa
- University of Tulsa
