= Stacy Leeds =

American lawyer

Stacy L. Leeds

22nd President of the University of Tulsa
- Assuming office July 1, 2026
- Succeeding: Brad Carson

Justice of the Supreme Court of the Cherokee Nation
- In office 2002 – December 2006
- Succeeded by: Troy Poteete

Personal details
- Born: 1971 (age 54–55)
- Citizenship: American; Cherokee Nation
- Education: Washington University (B.A.); University of Tulsa (J.D.); University of Tennessee (M.B.A.); University of Wisconsin (LL.M.)

Stacy L. Leeds (born 1971) is an American academic and former Supreme Court Justice for the Cherokee Nation who has served as President of the University of Tulsa since July 1, 2026.

Leed previously served on the Cherokee Nation Supreme Court from 2002 to 2006, when she retired to campaign for Principal Chief of the Cherokee Nation. She lost the election, but went on to serve as the first Indigenous woman to lead a law school in the United States when she was appointed dean of the University of Arkansas School of Law in 2011. She left the University of Arkansas in 2018 and later served as the dean of the Sandra Day O'Connor College of Law.

In March 2026, the University of Tulsa announced Leeds as the 22nd president of the university, effective July 1, 2026.

== Early life and education ==
Stacy Leeds is a Cherokee Nation citizen who was born and raised in Muskogee, Oklahoma, where she was all-state athlete at Muskogee High School. She attended Washington University in St. Louis for her bachelor's degree, where she set an NCAA record. She graduated from the University of Tulsa College of Law with a Juris Doctor in 1997.

She also earned her MBA from the University of Tennessee Executive MBA program and her Master of Laws degree from the University of Wisconsin.

== Academic and judicial career ==
Leeds served six years as the district judge for the Prairie Band of Potawatomi Nation and two years as district judge for the Muscogee Nation. She also served as judge for the Kaw Nation, Kickapoo Tribe of Oklahoma, Turtle Mountain Band of Chippewa Indians, and the Kickapoo Tribe of Kansas.

She was the first woman to ever serve as a Cherokee Nation Supreme Court justice after her appointment in 2002. She served on the court until 2006. She campaigned for Principal Chief of the Cherokee Nation in 2007.

From 2011 to 2018, Leeds served as the 12th Dean of the University of Arkansas School of Law. She formerly served as Interim Associate Dean for Academic Affairs and Professor of Law at the University of Kansas and the Director of Tribal Law and Government Center at KU. Previously Leeds taught law at the University of North Dakota and served as Director of the Northern Plains Indian Law Center.

She served as the inaugural Vice Chancellor for Economic Development (2017–2020), Dean Emeritus and Professor of Law at the University of Arkansas, providing leadership for campus-wide engagement, collaboration, and outreach to citizens, businesses, governmental and nonprofit entities in Arkansas and beyond. Leeds worked closely with UA's ten colleges, schools and divisions to amplify the university's economic and social impact.

Leeds was appointed Foundation Professor of Law and Leadership for the Sandra Day O’Connor College of Law at Arizona State University in January 2018. Leeds was in ASU Law’s Indian Legal Program. In November 2022, it was announced that Leeds would become the William H. Pedrick Dean of ASU Law, the second woman to serve in this role.

On March 9, 2026, the University of Tulsa announced Leeds had been selected to be the 22nd president of the university, effective July 1, 2026.

== Honors ==
In 2006 Leeds received the AALS Clyde Ferguson Award for Excellence in Teaching, Service, and Scholarship. At KU she received the Immel Award for Teaching Excellence, and she has been named Alumni of the Year from the National Native American Law Students Association.

Leeds received the Fletcher Fellowship in 2008, when she was also named a nonresident fellow of the W. E. B. Du Bois Institute at Harvard University. While teaching at the University of Wisconsin, she was the William H. Hastie Fellow.

In 2024, she was elected to the American Philosophical Society.

== Published works ==
- Leeds, Stacy L. and Angelique Townsend Eaglewoman. Mastering American Indian Law. 2013.
- Leeds, Stacy L. American Indian Property. Durham, NC: Carolina Academic Press, 2008. ISBN 978-1-59460-262-7
- Leeds, Stacy L., Darrell Dowty, Darell Matlock, and the Cherokee Nation. In the Judicial Appeals Tribunal of the Cherokee Nation: Lucy Allen, petitioner, v. Cherokee Nation Tribal Council, Lela Ummerteskee, registrar, and registration committee, respondents. Tahlequah, OK: Cherokee Nation, 2006.
- Leeds, Stacy L. Cross Jurisdictional Recognition and Enforcement of Judgments. Madison: University of Wisconsin, 2009.

== See also ==
- List of Native American jurists
- Native American women in politics

Preceded by Brad Carson; Rick Dickson (interim)	President of the University of Tulsa; 2026–present	Succeeded by Incumbent
