= KWGS =

Radio station in Tulsa, Oklahoma, U.S.

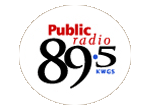
- Tulsa, Oklahoma; United States
- Broadcast area: Tulsa metropolitan area
- Frequency: 89.5 MHz (HD Radio)
- Branding: Public Radio 89.5

Programming
- Format: Public Radio–News/Talk
- Subchannels: HD2: Jazz "Jazz 89.5 HD2"; HD3: BBC World Service "World Radio 89.5 HD3"
- Affiliations: National Public Radio; American Public Media; Public Radio Exchange; BBC World Service

Ownership
- Owner: The University of Tulsa
- Sister stations: KWTU

History
- First air date: October 19, 1947
- Call sign meaning: William Grove Skelly (Tulsa philanthropist)

Technical information
- Licensing authority: FCC
- Facility ID: 66586
- Class: C1
- ERP: 50,000 watts
- HAAT: 325 meters (1,066 ft)
- Transmitter coordinates: 36°1′15.4″N 95°40′32.9″W

Links
- Public license information: Public file; LMS
- Website: www.publicradiotulsa.org

KWGS (89.5 FM) is a listener-supported, non-commercial, public radio station in Tulsa, Oklahoma, United States. KWGS and its classical music sister station 88.7 KWTU are owned by the University of Tulsa. Its studios and offices are located in Kendall Hall near the intersection of 5th Place and Florence Avenue, on the university's campus.

KWGS is a Class C1 station, and has an effective radiated power (ERP) of 50,000 watts. The station's transmitter is on South 273rd Avenue East, off the Muskogee Turnpike in Broken Arrow. KWGS is licensed by the Federal Communications Commission to broadcast in the HD (hybrid) format.

== History ==
KWGS is Tulsa's oldest FM station, it was established in the 1940s through the initiative of TU speech professor Ben Graf Henneke, who later became president of the university. The call letters are the initials of Tulsa oil executive and philanthropist William G. Skelly, who provided the funding.

The station signed on the air on October 19, 1947. For most of its early years, it was a college radio station, offering students a chance to develop broadcasting skills.

In the 1960s, it increased its power to 4,100 watts, using a 500-foot (152-meter) tower. That allowed it to be heard around Tulsa and adjacent suburbs. In the 1980s, the station's signal was upgraded, increasing both power and tower height to current levels. At that time, KWGS switched to a public radio news and information format, becoming a member of National Public Radio.

Until the early 2000s, KWGS's schedule included some classical music, along with its news and information programming. Management wanted to give classical listeners a full time station. In 2004, co-owned 88.7 KWTU came on the air, offering classical and other genres of music. That allowed KWGS to air all news, talk and information most days, with some music on weekends.

== Programming ==
News makes up the majority of programming on KWGS. It is a National Public Radio (NPR) member station. It airs shows from NPR and other public radio networks on weekdays, including Morning Edition, All Things Considered, Fresh Air, 1A, Here and Now and Marketplace. The BBC World Service runs overnight.

On weekends, KWGS carries hour-long specialty shows, including Snap Judgment, Radiolab, The Moth Radio Hour, Selected Shorts, It's Been A Minute, Freakonomics Radio, This American Life, Latino USA, Hidden Brain, To the Best of Our Knowledge, The Splendid Table, The TED Radio Hour and Wait, Wait, Don't Tell Me. Music shows are heard on weekend evenings, mostly jazz as well as folk and world music. The station airs American Routes on Sunday evenings.
