= The Collegian =

The Collegian may refer to:

== Publications ==
- Daily Collegian (Pennsylvania State University)
- The Massachusetts Daily Collegian
- The Collegian (San Joaquin Delta College)
- The Collegian (Hillsdale College)
- The Collegian (Houston Baptist University)
- The Collegian (Kansas State University)
- The Collegian (La Salle University)
- The Collegian (Lorain County Community College)
- The Collegian (Mississippi College)
- The Collegian (Stewart's Melville College)
- The Collegian (Morton College)
- The Collegian (University of Richmond)
- The Collegian (South Dakota State University)
- University of Tulsa Collegian
- The Collegian (University of Texas at Brownsville)
- The Collegian (Walla Walla College)
- The Collegian (Willamette University), college newspaper of Willamette University
- The student newspaper publication at Baltimore City College
- The Collegian (California State University, Fresno)
- The Independent Collegian, University of Toledo student newspaper formerly known as The Collegian
- The student newspaper publication at Macleans College
- Rocky Mountain Collegian, student newspaper at Colorado State University

== Films ==
- The Collegians, a 1926 film series directed by Wesley Ruggles
