= KWTU =

Radio station in Tulsa, Oklahoma

Coordinates: 36.021°N 95.676°W

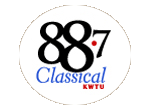
- Tulsa, Oklahoma; United States
- Broadcast area: Tulsa metropolitan area
- Frequency: 88.7 MHz (HD Radio)
- Branding: Classical 88.7

Programming
- Format: Classical music
- Affiliations: Classical 24 (APM); Performance Today (NPR)

Ownership
- Owner: The University of Tulsa
- Sister stations: KWGS

History
- First air date: October 15, 2004
- Call sign meaning: Tulsa

Technical information
- Licensing authority: FCC
- Facility ID: 81517
- Class: C2
- ERP: 5,000 watts
- HAAT: 325 meters (1,066 ft)

Links
- Public license information: Public file; LMS
- Webcast: Listen live
- Website: publicradiotulsa.org

KWTU (88.7 FM) is a non-commercial radio station in Tulsa, Oklahoma, United States, featuring a classical music format. KWTU is owned by The University of Tulsa. The transmitter is located on South 273rd East Avenue near the Muskogee Turnpike in Broken Arrow. KWTU also broadcasts in HD Radio; the second digital subchannel plays music from the Great American Songbook.

== History ==
On October 15, 2004, KWTU first signed on the air. Tulsa Public Radio's KWGS 89.3 FM had a schedule of mostly news and information, with some classical programming. Management wanted to create an all-classical station for music fans and allow KWGS to air a full time news and info schedule.

According to the Tulsa World newspaper, 88.7 MHz was the last open frequency on the FM dial in Tulsa. Because 88.7 and adjacent frequencies already had stations nearby, KWTU's 5,000 watt signal was the maximum allowed by the FCC. By contrast, KWGS is powered at 50,000 watts and some Tulsa stations run 100,000 watts.
