= University of Tulsa Collegian =

University of Tulsa student newspaper

The Collegian
- Type: Student newspaper
- Format: Broadsheet
- Owner(s): Independent
- Founded: 1910
- Headquarters: 110 Oliphant Hall; University of Tulsa; Tulsa, Oklahoma; United States
- Circulation: 2,500
- Price: Free
- Website: tucollegian.org

The Collegian is the official student newspaper at The University of Tulsa. It is a weekly issue in broadsheet format.

The Collegian is an independently operated, edited, and written by the students apart from the administration, which has occasionally led to conflict with the administration when it is critical of or has contrary views to administration policy. The newspaper is distributed campus-wide weekly throughout the school year, with new issues typically released every Monday.

The paper was begun as the Kendall Review on October 4, 1910, and was published bi-monthly. The Collegian was founded in its current title in October 1911, and was converted to a monthly format. The Collegian was converted to its weekly format sometime around 1941.
