= Robert Donaldson (political scientist) =

Robert H. Donaldson
- Born: Robert Herschel Donaldson; June 14, 1943 (age 83); USA
- Occupations: Professor, political scientist
- Spouse: Sally A. Donaldson
- Writing career
- Notable works: The Foreign Policy of Russia: Changing Systems, Enduring Interests
- Website: www.personal.utulsa.edu/~robert-donaldson/

Robert Herschel Donaldson (born June 14, 1943) is an American political scientist.

Donaldson attended Harvard University. He completed his Bachelor of Arts magna cum laude in 1964, his Master of Arts in 1966, and his Ph.D. in 1969. His doctoral dissertation analyzed the Soviet Union's economic policies. He was admitted to Phi Beta Kappa society as an undergraduate and has remained active in the organization as a professor.

Donaldson began his teaching career at Vanderbilt University, where he rose from assistant professor to full professor and associate dean of the College of Arts and Science. In 1981, he became the provost of Lehman College of the City University of New York. In 1984, he became president of Fairleigh Dickinson University and served until 1990, when he became president of the University of Tulsa. He worked to raise the university's profile through international conferences in Tulsa and exchange programs, particularly with institutions in Russia. His tenure as president was "marked by change and criticism," including a unanimous vote of no confidence by the student government. "Citing 'institutional stresses' and conflicting expectations among school constituencies," he resigned as president in 1996.

After stepping down as president, Donaldson remained at the University of Tulsa as a professor of political science until his retirement in 2013.
