= James Joyce Quarterly =

- Discipline: Literature
- Language: English
- Edited by: Sean Latham

Publication details
- History: 1963–present
- Publisher: University of Tulsa (United States)
- Frequency: Quarterly

Standard abbreviations
- ISO 4: James Joyce Q.

Indexing
- ISSN: 0021-4183 (print); 1938-6036 (web)
- JSTOR: 00214183

Links
- Journal homepage

The James Joyce Quarterly (JJQ) is a peer-reviewed academic journal established in 1963 that covers critical and theoretical work focusing on the life, writing, and reception of James Joyce. The journal publishes essays, notes, reviews, letters, and a comprehensive checklist of recent Joyce-related publications.

To supplement the print journal, JJQ also has an online version. The site provides an archive of past issues, a resources page, links to full-text options available on JSTOR and Project MUSE, a calendar of Joyce events, and an on-line checklist.

== History ==
The James Joyce Quarterly was established in 1963 at the University of Tulsa by Thomas F. Staley, who was the journal's editor-in-chief for its first twenty-five years. From 1989 to 2001 Robert Spoo edited the journal and in 2001 Sean Latham succeeded Spoo. In 2022 Latham announced he was stepping down as editor, with Spoo returning as co-editor along with Jeff Drouin.

Notable contributors to the JJQ include Fritz Senn, Hans Walter Gabler, Morris Beja, John McCourt, Vicki Mahaffey, Margot Norris, and Michael Groden.

== Awards ==
JJQ received an "Honorable Mention" for "Best Design" from the Council of Editors of Learned Journals.
