= Thomas F. Staley =

American literary scholar (1935–2022)

Thomas Fabian Staley (August 13, 1935 – March 29, 2022) was an American author, professor, and library director. He was director of the Harry Ransom Center at The University of Texas at Austin. He authored or edited 15 books on literary topics and was the founding editor of the James Joyce Quarterly.
