= William Skelly =

American oil industrialist and businessman (1878–1957)

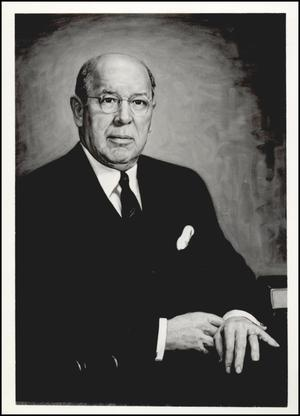
- Born: William Grove Skelly; June 10, 1878; Erie, Pennsylvania, U.S.
- Died: April 11, 1957 (aged 78); Tulsa, Oklahoma, U.S.
- Occupations: Businessman, entrepreneur
- Children: Carolyn Mary Skelly; Joanna Jane Skelly

William Grove Skelly (June 10, 1878 – April 11, 1957) was an American entrepreneur who made a fortune in the oil business. Born in Erie, Pennsylvania, he moved to Kansas in 1916, then to Tulsa, Oklahoma, in 1919, where he founded the Skelly Oil Company. By 1923, his company was one of the strongest independent producers of oil and gasoline in the United States. He helped organize the first International Petroleum Exposition in Tulsa in 1923 and became president of that organization, a position he held for the rest of his life. He was a founder of the Kansas-Oklahoma branch of the United States Oil and Gas Association, then known as Mid-Continent Oil and Gas Association.

Skelly also became an active promoter of the aviation industry, though he was not a pilot himself. In 1926, he purchased the financially struggling Mid-Continent Aircraft Company and turned it into the successful Spartan Aircraft Company. In 1928, he led the fundraising to build the Tulsa Municipal Airport. In October 1928, he opened the Spartan School of Aeronautics.

Skelly was active in other civic projects. He donated funds to the University of Tulsa for a football stadium in 1930 and for KWGS, the first FM radio station in Oklahoma, in 1947.

== Early life ==
Bill Skelly was one of six children born to William and Mary Jane Sweatman Skelly. He began earning money by selling newspapers while he was still in grammar school. Finishing public school at age 14, he attended a business school for a year. After completing the business course, he worked with his father hauling oil-well supplies to oil fields in Venango County, Pennsylvania. Soon, he became a tool dresser in the Venango fields.

In 1898, the Spanish–American War broke out. Skelly enlisted in the Sixteenth Pennsylvania Volunteers and participated in the Battle of Coamo in Puerto Rico. After the war, he became manager of the Citizens Gas Company in Gas City, Indiana, where he learned the technology of transporting and controlling natural gas through pipelines.

== Career in oil and gas production ==
Observing the fortunes made by others during the oil booms of Illinois, Indiana, and Ohio, Skelly decided to become an independent producer. After a brief stay in Texas, he moved to El Dorado, Kansas, in 1916, where he began operating his Midland Refining Company in 1917. In 1919, he incorporated Skelly Oil Company and moved his headquarters to Tulsa.

In 1923, while serving as president of the Tulsa Chamber of Commerce, Skelly helped organize the first International Petroleum Exposition (IPE). This was a trade fair that attracted oil producers and equipment manufacturers from all over the country. He became president of the IPE in 1925 and held that position for the rest of his life.

== Aviation ==
In 1928, Skelly purchased the struggling Mid-Continent Aircraft Company, which had a manufacturing plant in Tulsa. He reorganized it under the name Spartan Aircraft Company. In October 1928, he opened the Spartan School of Aeronautics to train pilots and mechanics. The school also facilitated sales of Spartan aircraft. In 1935, Skelly sold the manufacturing business to J. Paul Getty. Skelly retained ownership of the school.

In 1927, Skelly obtained signatures from several prominent Tulsa businessmen put up $172,000 to buy 390 acres (178 ha) of land for use as a municipal airport. It was dedicated and officially opened July 3, 1928. The city of Tulsa purchased the airport, then named Tulsa Municipal Airport, in 1929, and put its supervision under the Tulsa Park Board.

== Radio and television ==
In 1928, Skelly bought radio station KVOO (now KOTV), which became a powerful clear-channel station known as the "Voice of Oklahoma". He provided the funding for the University of Tulsa's radio station, founded in 1947 and named KWGS in his honor. In 1954, Skelly, a steadfast Republican, and Senator Robert S. Kerr, an equally steadfast Democrat, founded the television station KVOO-TV (now KJRH-TV).

== Death ==
William G. Skelly died in Tulsa on April 11, 1957. He was interred at Rose Hill Cemetery in Tulsa. Gertrude was interred beside him after her death October 8, 1959.

== Skelly Mansion ==
William G. Skelly house in Tulsa

Skelly purchased a 10,000 square feet (930 m^{2}) mansion at the corner of 21st Street and Madison Avenue, Tulsa, in 1923. After he died in 1957, Gertrude donated the building and its furnishings to the University of Tulsa, which sold it to private owners in 1959. The Skelly Mansion was added to the National Register of Historic Places in 1978. On July 5, 2012, the university announced that it would repurchase the house as a residence for its president, who would live on the second floor. The ground floor is used by the university to host special events. The structure is now officially known as Skelly House.

== Legacy ==
Many of Skelly's accomplishments survived him. The International Petroleum Exposition had its peak attendance in 1966 and continued to be held in Tulsa until 1979.

In 1952, the 51st Street Bypass, the highway through south Tulsa that connects the Turner Turnpike and the Will Rogers Turnpike (now part of Interstate 44), was named Skelly Drive in William Skelly's honor.

Skelly was the primary benefactor for Skelly Field, the football stadium at the University of Tulsa, which opened in 1930. Later renamed Skelly Stadium, at one time it seated 40,385. Renovated in 2007–2008, it was renamed Skelly Field at H. A. Chapman Stadium and now seats 30,000.

Spartan School of Aeronautics still exists, and was renamed to Spartan College of Aeronautics and Technology on March 31, 2015.

Skellytown, Texas, was named for him.
