= Lyle School of Engineering =

School of engineering at Southern Methodist University

Coordinates: 32.8464°N 96.7861°W

Bobby B. Lyle School of Engineering
- Type: Private
- Established: 1925
- Dean: Nader Jalili, Ph.D.
- Academic staff: 60+
- Undergraduates: 1,000+
- Postgraduates: 500+
- Location: Dallas, Texas, United States
- Campus: Urban
- Website: www.smu.edu/lyle

The Bobby B. Lyle School of Engineering is the school of engineering at Southern Methodist University in Dallas, Texas. The engineering program has existed at SMU since 1925. Many of the college's degree programs are accredited by ABET. The school is divided into five departments, or areas of study - Civil and Environmental Engineering, Computer Science, Electrical and Computer Engineering, Operations Research and Engineering Management, and Mechanical Engineering. In October 2008, the school was renamed for alumnus and SMU trustee Bobby B. Lyle.

== History ==
The engineering program has existed at SMU since 1925. In October 2008, the school was renamed for alumnus and SMU trustee Bobby B. Lyle.

== Departments ==
Computer Science and Engineering- Offers degrees in both computer science and computer engineering. Undergraduate and graduate programs focus on all aspects of computer design as well as software construction and applications.

Electrical Engineering- Offers degrees in electrical engineering covering core technology topics in areas such as biomedical engineering, communications and information technology, control systems, digital signal processing, and computer vision, lasers, optoelectronics, electromagnetic theory and microwave electronics, circuit and VLSI design.

Engineering Management, Information, and Systems- Offers degrees in systems engineering, engineering management, operations research, and management science. Programs focus on the study, design, and management of the technology-rich systems that drive today's information-intensive organizations.

Civil and Environmental Engineering- Offers degrees in both civil engineering and environmental engineering. Programs focus on planning, designing, constructing, maintaining, and managing the nation’s physical infrastructure such as buildings, bridges, power plants, water and wastewater systems while also focused on conservation, natural resource recovery, air quality and pollution control, and environmental health. SMU Engineering is the only school in Texas to offer a degree in Environmental Engineering, an area of growing demand all across industry.

Mechanical Engineering- Offers degrees in mechanical engineering. Programs focused on solutions to problems in design and manufacturing, robotics, automotive and transportation systems, energy production and distribution, as well as all other aspects of mechanical systems.

== Facilities ==
Lyle School of Engineering offers students teaching and research facilities. In addition to the Jerry R. Junkins Building which opened in 2002, SMU has now added the J. Lindsay Embrey Engineering Building to the engineering quadrangle. In 2009 Caruth Hall was torn down and construction for a new and improved Caruth Hall began. Caruth Hall "2.0" (as it was dubbed in construction plans) opened in 2010.

The Embrey Building is home to the departments of Mechanical, Environmental & Civil Engineering. Overall there are more than 30 laboratories used by SMU Engineering faculty and students. Employers and other presenters come to the Huitt-Zollars Pavilion in the Embrey Building.

== Work experience ==
Students gain experience through the undergraduate co-op program, the oldest in the Southwest; the Industry Scholars Program, offering corporate-sponsored internships and scholarships; and other domestic and international internships.

== Executive and Distance Education ==
Lyle Engineering is a pioneer in distance learning, beginning in 1969. Today, students are subjected to digitally-recorded instruction in all graduate engineering degree programs. Lyle Engineering offers the largest Executive master's degree Program in the country and one of the largest and oldest degree-granting distance education programs for working students.

== International Education ==
Tecnologico de Monterrey (Mexico)- The Lyle School of Engineering offers two programs for students from Tecnologico de Monterrey in Mexico: The Visiting Student Certificate Program enables Tecnologico de Monterrey undergraduates to spend a semester studying at SMU in Dallas. The Collaborative master's degree Program enables Tecnologico de Monterrey students to earn a master's degree from SMU in one year.

City of Knowledge (Panama)- The Lyle School of Engineering and the City of Knowledge have initiated an executive master's degree program that enables participants to acquire a master's degree from SMU with the convenience of a Central American location.

Universidad Francisco Marroquin (Guatemala)- The Lyle School of Engineering has signed an agreement with the School of Business and Economics at Universidad Francisco Marroquin in Guatemala City that will enable business students from Guatemala to spend a semester taking engineering courses in Dallas

== Gender Parity Initiative ==
The percentage of women in engineering at SMU Lyle is 50% higher than the national average. Lyle Engineering's goal is to reach gender parity in the next five years.

== Research & Special Programs ==
The Lyle School of Engineering also houses the Research Center for Advanced Manufacturing in the Mechanical Engineering Department which is extensively funded by government agencies and industry. This center is headed by Dr. Radovan Kovacevic.

The School also houses:

- The Caruth Institute for Engineering Education
- The Linda and Mitch Hart eCenter
- The Infinity Project
- The Hart Center for Engineering Education
- The Hunt Institute for Engineering and Humanity
