= Mary T. Reynolds =

American authority on the Irish writer James Joyce

Mary Reynolds
- Born: c 1913; Milwaukee
- Died: 25 August 2000; Washington, USA
- Occupations: Academic, writer

Mary Trackett Reynolds (c. 1913 – 25 August 2000) was an American authority on the Irish writer James Joyce.

== Life and work ==
Mary Trackett Reynolds was born in Milwaukee. She was educated in the University of Wisconsin–Madison where she graduated with a bachelor's and master's degree. Her doctorate in political science was gained from Columbia University. She remained in academia and worked teaching political science at colleges such as Hunter, Brooklyn and Queens colleges in New York City and Johns Hopkins University in Baltimore as well as a seminar on Irish literature and history at Yale.

Considered the seminal authority on Joyce, Reynolds was also a trustee of the International James Joyce Foundation. She was an editor at the Joyce Studies Annual and the James Joyce Quarterly. Reynolds was involved in seeing Ulysses get published in China in the 1990s.

She died of non-Hodgkin's lymphoma leaving a husband, two daughters and a son.

== Bibliography ==
- Joyce and Dante: The Shaping Imagination (Princeton University Press, 1981)
- Joyce and Nora (1964)
- Joyce and D'Annunzio (1976)
- Mr. Bloom and the Lost Vermeer (1989)
- James Joyce: New Century Views (1993).
