= Radovan Kovacevic =

Serbian-American university professor

Radovan Kovacevic is a Serbian-American university professor. He is the director of the Southern Methodist University Research Center for Advanced Manufacturing. He holds seven U.S. patents. He was a Fulbright Scholar in 1984.
