= University of Tulsa =

Private university in Tulsa, Oklahoma, U.S.

- Former names: Presbyterian School for Indian Girls (1882–1894); Henry Kendall College (1894–1920)
- Motto: "Wisdom, Faith, Service"
- Type: Private research university
- Established: 1894; 132 years ago
- Accreditation: HLC
- Religious affiliation: Nondenominational, historically Presbyterian Church (USA)
- Academic affiliations: APCU; NAICU; ORAU
- Endowment: $1.335 billion (2025)
- President: Stacy Leeds
- Faculty: 292 (full-time)
- Students: 4,154
- Undergraduates: 3,029
- Postgraduates: 1,113
- Location: Tulsa, Oklahoma, United States; 36°09′08″N 95°56′47″W
- Campus: 230 acres (930,000 m^{2}); Large city
- Newspaper: The Collegian
- Colors: Royal blue, old gold, and crimson
- Nickname: Golden Hurricane
- Sporting affiliations: NCAA Division I FBS – American Conference
- Mascot: Gus T.
- Website: www.utulsa.edu

The University of Tulsa (TU) is a private research university in Tulsa, Oklahoma, United States. Originally established as the Presbyterian School for Indian Girls and later as the Henry Kendall College in 1894, it merged with the proposed McFarlin College to become the University of Tulsa in 1920. As of 2024, the university enrolled 3,769 students.

Tulsa's athletic teams are collectively known as the Tulsa Golden Hurricane and compete in Division I of the NCAA as members of the American Conference. Its mascot is Gus T and its official colors are royal blue, old gold, and crimson.

== History ==
=== Frontier Origins ===
The Presbyterian School for Indian Girls (also known as "Minerva Home") was founded in Muskogee, Indian Territory, in 1882 to offer a primary education to young women of the Creek Nation.

In 1894, the young school expanded to become Henry Kendall College, named in honor of Henry Kendall, secretary of the Presbyterian Board of Home Missions. The first president was William A. Caldwell, who served a brief two-year term, which ended in 1896.

Caldwell was succeeded by William Robert King, a Presbyterian minister and co-founder of the college, who had come to Oklahoma from Tennessee, by way of the Union Theological Seminary in New York City. Kendall College, while still in Muskogee, granted the first post-secondary degree in Oklahoma in June 1898. Under King, the college was moved from its original location in downtown Muskogee to a larger campus on lands donated by Creek Nation Chief Pleasant Porter.

Kendall College students, faculty and administrators were instrumental in efforts to get the State of Sequoyah recognized; they wrote most of the proposed constitution and designed the seal among other things.

The opening of the new campus coincided with the start of the tenure of the third president, A. Grant Evans. Over the next 10 years, Evans oversaw the struggling school's growth. In most years, class sizes remained small and although the academy, the attached elementary, middle, and high school was more successful; by the end of the 1906–07 year Kendall College had had only 27 collegiate graduates. At the request of the administration, the Synod of Indian Territory assumed control as trustees and began to look at alternatives for the future of the school. When the administration was approached by the comparatively smaller town of Tulsa and offered a chance to move, the decision was made to relocate.

=== Relocation to Tulsa ===
The Tulsa Commercial Club (a forerunner of the Tulsa Chamber of Commerce) decided to bid for the college. Club members who packaged a bid in 1907 to move the college to Tulsa included: B. Betters, H. O. McClure, L. N. Butts, W. L. North, James H. Hall (sic), Grant C. Stebbins, Charles W. Kerr, and C. H. Nicholson. The offer included $100,000, 20 acres of real estate, and a guarantee for utilities and street car service.

The college opened to 35 students in September 1907, two months before Oklahoma became a state. These first students attended classes at the First Presbyterian Church until permanent buildings could be erected on the new campus. This became the start of higher education in Tulsa. Kendall Hall, the first building of the new school, was completed in 1908 and was quickly followed by two other buildings. All three buildings have since been demolished, with Kendall the last to be razed in 1972. The bell that once hung in the Kendall Building tower was saved and displayed in Bayless Plaza.

The Kendall College presidents during 1907–1919 were Arthur Grant Evans, Levi Harrison Beeler, Seth Reed Gordon, Frederick William Hawley, Ralph J. Lamb, Charles Evans, James G. McMurtry and Arthur L. Odell.

In 1918, the Methodist Church proposed building a college in Tulsa, using money donated by a Tulsa oilman Robert M. McFarlin. The proposed college was to be named McFarlin College. However, it was soon apparent that Tulsa could not yet support two competing schools. In 1920, Henry Kendall College merged with the proposed McFarlin College to become the University of Tulsa. The McFarlin Library of TU was named for the principal donor of the proposed college. The name of Henry Kendall has lived on to the present as the Kendall College of Arts and Sciences.

=== 20th century ===
The University of Tulsa opened its School of Petroleum Engineering in 1928.

The Great Depression hit the university hard. By 1935, the school was about to close because of its poor financial condition. It had a debt of $250,000, enrollment had fallen to 300 students (including many who could not pay their tuition), the faculty was poorly paid and morale was low. It was then that the oil tycoon and TU-patron Waite Phillips offered the school presidency to Clarence Isaiah ("Cy") Pontius, a former investment banker. His primary focus would be to rescue the school's finances. A dean's council would take charge of academic issues.

However, Pontius' accomplishments went beyond raising money. During his tenure, the following events occurred:

- In 1935, the university opened the College of Business Administration, which it renamed the Collins College of Business in 2008.
- The Tulsa Law School (University of Tulsa College of Law), located in downtown Tulsa, became part of the university in 1943.
- In 1948, oil magnate William G. Skelly donated funds to found the university radio station, KWGS (named for his initials), now known as Public Radio Tulsa.

Skelly House, one-time official residence for the president of the University of Tulsa

After William G. Skelly died, his widow donated the Skelly Mansion, at the corner of 21st Street and Madison Avenue, to the University of Tulsa. The school sold the mansion and its furnishings to private owners in 1959. On July 5, 2012, the university announced that it would repurchase the house as a residence for its president. TU sold the property in 2021.

In 1958, Ben Graf Henneke, a scholar of theater and communications, became the first alumnus to hold the presidency of the University of Tulsa. During his tenure, the university established new doctoral programs, increased the proportion of faculty with doctorates, started new publications including Petroleum Abstracts and the James Joyce Quarterly, developed a North Campus center for petroleum engineering research, and expanded many main campus facilities. He was succeeded by Eugene L. Swearingen, a Stanford University-trained economist and Oklahoma native who served on the National Finance Committee for the Jimmy Carter Presidential Campaign. Swearingen increased TU's endowment and expanded the footprint of its campus.

=== 21st century ===
In 2004, anthropologist Steadman Upham joined The University of Tulsa as president, having served in faculty and leadership positions at the University of Oregon and Arizona State University. Within five years of his arrival, TU saw 13 major construction projects and renovations on campus, ranging from the construction of the Roxana Rozsa and Robert Eugene Lorton Performance Center to the overhaul of Keplinger Hall, and plans for seven more major projects finalized (despite the nationwide recession).

The university also launched the Oxley College of Health Sciences, in downtown Tulsa, named in recognition of a major gift from Tulsa's Oxley Foundation. In 2023, the unit was renamed the Oxley College of Health & Natural Sciences. The university also partnered with the George Kaiser Family Foundation to temporarily house The Bob Dylan Archive at TU in 2016. Under Upham's leadership, the University of Tulsa assumed management of the famous Gilcrease Museum in northwest Tulsa.

In 2016, President Upham retired and was succeeded by Gerard Clancy, who previously served as a psychiatry professor and held leadership positions at the University of Iowa and the University of Oklahoma. About two and a half years into his presidency, in the spring of 2019, President Clancy and Provost Janet K. Levit announced a restructuring of academic programs at the university that would eliminate several academic programs. The plan was met with resistance from some faculty who believed it was formulated without adequate input from faculty. Although faculty members voted "no confidence" in the president and provost in November, the university's board of trustees publicly affirmed their support of the plan.

In January 2020, President Clancy informed the board that he needed to cut back on his activities because of unspecified medical issues. The board named Provost Levit as interim president of the school, effective in January 2020. (Note: Levit thus became the first woman to lead the school in its history.)

Former Congressman Brad R. Carson became president of the University of Tulsa on July 1, 2021. He resigned effective May 31, 2025. Stacy Leeds took office as president on July 1, 2026.

== Academics ==
Academic rankings

National
- Forbes: 307
- U.S. News & World Report: 158 (tie)
- Washington Monthly: 365
- WSJ/College Pulse: 240

Global
- QS: 701–750
- THE: 501–600
- U.S. News & World Report: 1794 (tie)

The University of Tulsa is classified among "R2: Doctoral Universities – High research activity".

=== Rankings ===
USNWR graduate school rankings
Petroleum Engineering	6
Law	120

USNWR departmental rankings
Clinical Psychology	146
Computer Science	176
English	113
Psychology	194
Speech–Language Pathology	159

U.S. News & World Report's 2025 edition of "Best Colleges" ranked the University of Tulsa tied for 179th among "national universities" and tied at 90th for "Best Value".

== Campus ==
The campus of the University of Tulsa centers on a wide, grassy, quad-like space known as Dietler Commons, formerly called "The U." The predominant architectural style is English Gothic. Most of the buildings are constructed from tan and rose-colored Crab Orchard sandstone from Tennessee interspersed with stone quarried in Arkansas. Other materials include Bedford limestone from Indiana and slate quarried in Vermont. The university's campus borders Tulsa's Kendall Whittier neighborhood and is not far from Tulsa's downtown and midtown neighborhoods. The campus, in particular its football venue Skelly Field, is located on the historic U.S. 66, America's "Mother Road" stretching from Chicago to Los Angeles.

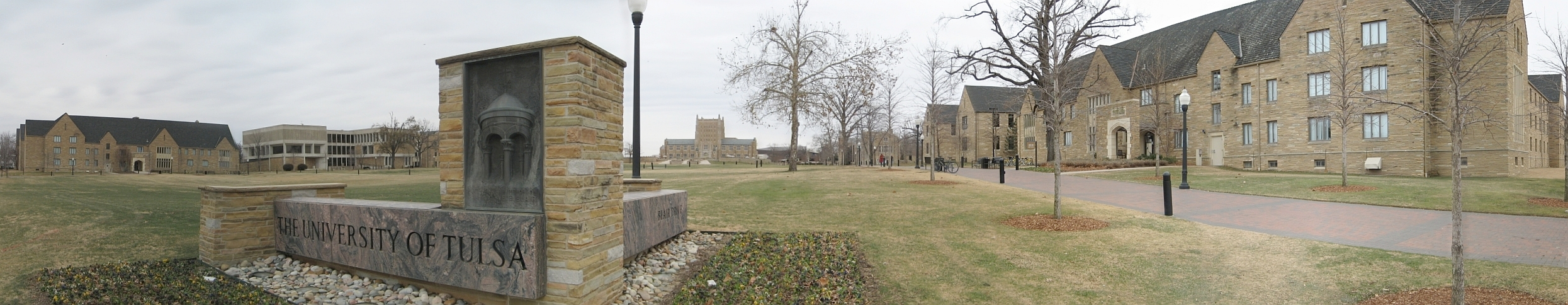
The University of Tulsa, viewed from South Delaware Avenue

=== Skelly Field at H. A. Chapman Stadium ===
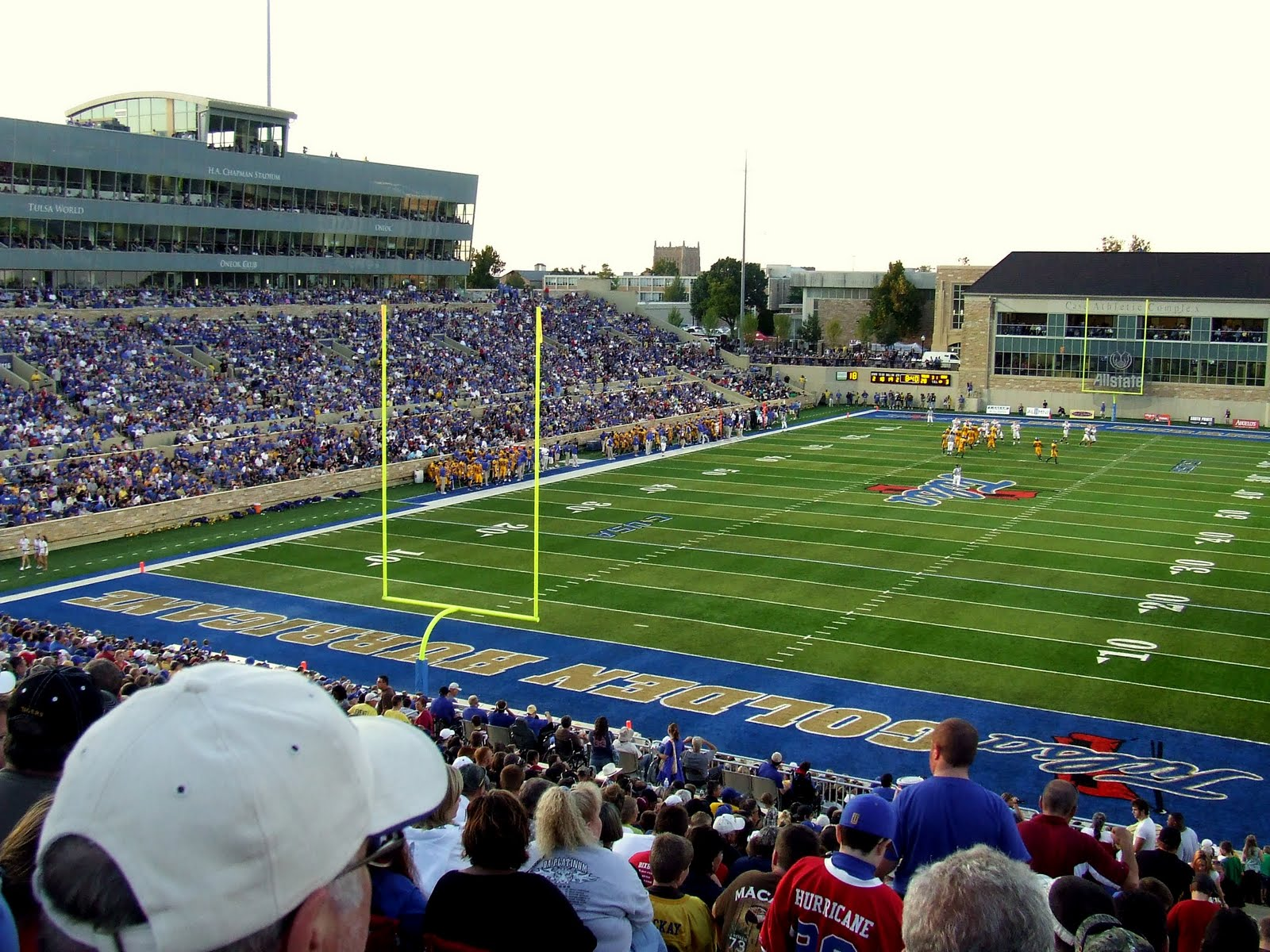
Chapman Stadium

Tulsa Golden Hurricane football has played home games at Skelly Field at H. A. Chapman Stadium since 1930.

=== Museums and libraries ===
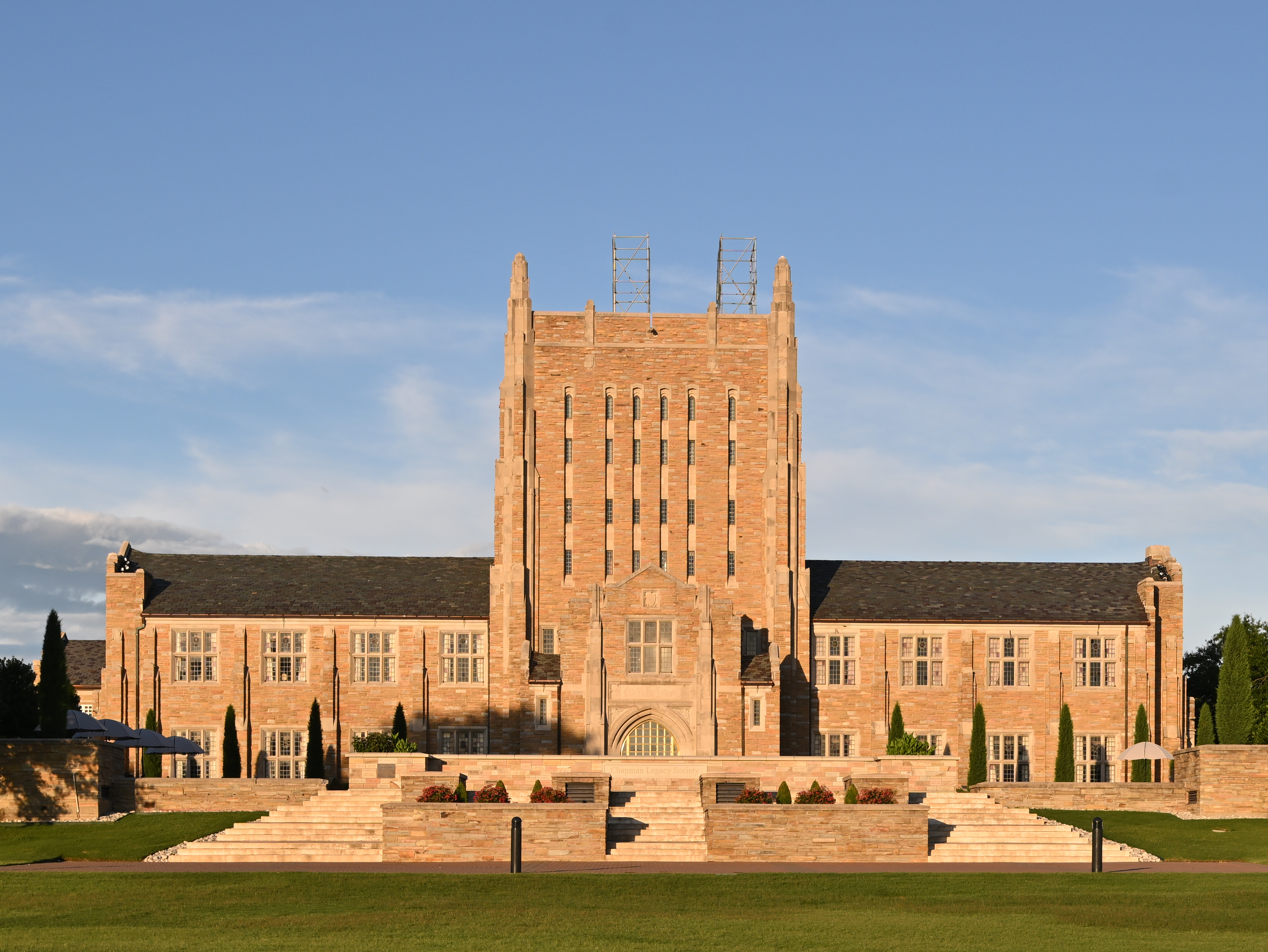
McFarlin Library, University of Tulsa

McFarlin Library: Resources and Notable Collections

The library's Department of Special Collections and University Archives houses over 12 million archival items and has over 1,000 collections on a wide-ranging array of topics including 20th-century British, Irish, and American literature, which includes the world's second-largest collection of materials by James Joyce. It also houses the papers of Nobel Prize winners V.S. Naipaul and Doris Lessing, as well as novelists and poets Jean Rhys, Eliot Bliss, David Plante, Anna Kavan, and Stevie Smith, just to name a few. In addition to these famous novelists, McFarlin Library houses the papers of Congresswoman Alice Mary Robertson, literary critic Richard Ellmann, comic book innovator E. Nelson Bridwell, Cherokee Principal Chief J.B. Milam, and writer/sexologist Edward Charles, among others. The Department of Special Collections also contains a vast collection of books on Native American history.

=== Partnership with Gilcrease Museum ===
In July 2008, the University of Tulsa took over management of Gilcrease Museum in a public-private partnership with the City of Tulsa. The museum has one of the largest collections of American Western art in the world (including famous works by Frederic Remington, Thomas Moran, and others) and houses growing collections of artifacts from Central and South America. The museum sits on 460 acres (1.9 km^{2}) in northwest Tulsa.

=== The Bob Dylan Archive ===
The Bob Dylan Archive is a collection of documents and objects relating to iconic American singer-songwriter Bob Dylan (whose mentor was Oklahoman Woody Guthrie). It was announced on March 2, 2016, that the archive had been acquired by the George Kaiser Family Foundation (GKFF) and the University of Tulsa. The university has since relinquished ownership to GKFF.

== Student body and student life ==
Student body composition as of May 2, 2022
Race and ethnicity	Total
White	53%
Other (Note: Other consists of Multiracial Americans & those who prefer to not say.)	12%
Hispanic	9%
Foreign national	9%
Black	7%
Asian	6%
Native American	3%
Economic diversity
Low-income (Note: The percentage of students who received an income-based federal Pell grant intended for low-income students.)	26%
Affluent (Note: The percentage of students who are a part of the American middle class at the bare minimum.)	74%

Students at the University of Tulsa represent 47 states and over 79 foreign countries, of which 58% are Oklahoma residents. The most common countries of origin for TU international students are China, Saudi Arabia, Oman, India, and Canada.

The University of Tulsa is home to more than 150 student organizations, registered with and partially funded by the Student Government Association.

=== Diversity and campus life ===
Several groups exist to support diversity on the University of Tulsa campus. There are at least 25 campus organizations existing to support and sustain a diverse campus community. In addition, TU hosts the Chevron Multicultural Resource Center, funded by a gift from the energy company, which hosts events and programming to promote diversity on campus.

Although TU has historic ties to the Presbyterian Church, the university has long embraced religious diversity. In 2002, TU was home to the first mosque built on an American university campus. TU also hosts a chapter of Hillel International, an organization to support Jewish life on campus. The university also hosts several organizations reflecting different streams of Christian spiritual practice, including Protestant, Catholic, and Orthodox.

=== 2015 student speech controversy ===
In February 2015, after the University of Tulsa suspended a student under its zero-tolerance policy for harassment for threatening and defamatory Facebook postings by his fiancée against multiple faculty members and a female student, administrators attempted to discourage the campus newspaper from publishing information the university deemed "confidential". The controversy was picked up by two websites that claimed the administration used "threats" and "intimidation" to "cover up" their handling of the disciplinary issue. In January 2016, the former student filed a lawsuit against the university, claiming his dismissal was unfair and was a breach of the institution's commitment to due process. The incident earned the university a spot on the Foundation for Individual Rights in Education (FIRE) 2016 "10 Worst Colleges for Free Speech". By 2023, however, the University of Tulsa had received a "green light" rating from the Foundation for Individual Rights and Expression in recognition of the university's commitment to free speech.

== Athletics ==
Tulsa's sports teams participate in NCAA Division I as a member of the American Conference; its football team is part of the Football Bowl Subdivision (FBS). Tulsa has the smallest undergraduate enrollment of any FBS school. TU has had rivalries with both Rice University and the University of Houston, with both having been conference rivalries in the 21st century. Tulsa and Houston had been rivals in Conference USA from Tulsa's arrival in 2005 until Houston left for what is now the American in 2013. A year later, TU joined Houston in the American, with the schools renewing their conference rivalry until UH left for the Big 12 Conference in 2023. At the same time UH left for the Big 12, Rice joined TU in the American. Tulsa also has two current rivalries with D-I schools that do not sponsor football—an in-conference rivalry with Wichita State University, especially in men's basketball, and a crosstown rivalry, most prominently in basketball, with Summit League member Oral Roberts University.

The university's nickname is the Golden Hurricane (it was originally the Golden Tornadoes). The Sound of the Golden Hurricane marching band plays at all home football and basketball games as well as traveling to championships in support of the Golden Hurricane. Tulsa has won six national championships (three NCAA): four in women's golf and two in men's basketball. The University of Tulsa currently fields a varsity team in seven men's sports and ten women's sports.

== Symbols ==
The school's colors are old gold (PMS 7502), royal blue (PMS 661C), and crimson (PMS 186).

The university's original motto was, in full: "Faith, Wisdom, Service: For Christ, For State."

== Media ==
The University of Tulsa Collegian is the long-standing independent and student-run newspaper on campus.

The following scholarly journals are published by the university:

- Nimrod International Journal of Prose and Poetry
- James Joyce Quarterly
- Tulsa Studies in Women's Literature
- Energy Law Journal
- Tulsa Law Review

In 2003 Tulsa joined the efforts of Brown University on the Modernist Journals Project, an online archive of early 20th-century periodicals. Tulsa has contributed various modernist texts from McFarlin Library's Special Collections to the project's website.

Sean Latham, then-editor of the James Joyce Quarterly, brought the 2003 North American James Joyce Conference to the University of Tulsa.

The university is the owner of the Tulsa region's National Public Radio station, KWGS, as well as KWTU, which airs a classical music format.

== Notable people ==
TU students have won 67 Goldwater Scholarships, 5 Marshall Scholarships, 3 Rhodes Scholarships (9 Rhodes finalists), 28 Fulbright Scholarships, and numerous Department of Defense, National Science Foundation, and Morris K. Udall Fellowships.

=== Alumni ===
Alumni include Walmart CEO Doug McMillon, Brazilian billionaire businessman Ermirio Pereira de Moraes; Kuwaiti Petroleum Company CEO Hani Abdulaziz Al Hussein, Suhail Al Mazroui, Cherokee Nation Chief Chad "Corntassel" Smith, and Minister of Energy & Industry for the United Arab Emirates.New York School poet Ted Berrigan, The Outsiders author S.E. Hinton, voicemail inventor Gordon Matthews, roboticist and author Daniel H. Wilson, and botanist and ecologist Harriet George Barclay.

Others include Golden Girls actress Rue McClanahan, radio broadcaster Paul Harvey, TV personality Dr. Phil McGraw (who played football for TU but did not graduate), actor Peter McRobbie, U.S. Congressman and Pro Football Hall of Fame wide receiver Steve Largent, NFL defensive end and NFL Super Bowl champion Lyle Alzado, and NBA basketball point guard and NBA champion Steve Bracey.

=== Faculty ===
Faculty members include psychologist Robert Hogan, political scientist Robert Donaldson, Catholic philosopher F. Russell Hittinger, and computer scientist Sujeet Shenoi. Artist Adah Robinson was the founder and first chairperson of the university's Department of Art. Former faculty members include feminist pioneer Germaine Greer, Booker-prize winning novelist Paul Scott, author and critic Darcy O'Brien, and the famous Russian poet and dissident intellectual Yevgeny Yevtushenko, legal scholars Paul Finkelman and Larry Catá Backer, psychologist Brent Roberts, painter Alexandre Hogue, and Catholic Bishop Daniel Henry Mueggenborg.
