= San Jose State transgender volleyball controversy =

2024 controversy in American volleyball

The 2024 San Jose State transgender volleyball controversy is an ongoing collegiate athletics dispute that emerged after a longtime player for the San Jose State Spartans women's volleyball team was outed as a trans woman.

The controversy subsequently became fuel for Donald Trump's 2024 presidential campaign and led to several lawsuits, protests, losses of athletic opportunities for other trans athletes, and punitive measures imposed upon San Jose State University after Trump assumed his second term.

== Background ==
=== Blaire Fleming ===
Blaire Fleming (born February 17, 2002) was an outside hitter for the San Jose State Spartans volleyball. Her athletic performance was described as "middle of the pack" and "good, but unremarkable and unremarked-upon". She grew up in Virginia, and transitioned socially and medically at the age of 14; before playing girls' volleyball in high school.

After drawing the attention of college recruiters, Fleming was honest with all the colleges she visited about being transgender, and eventually accepted a scholarship to play volleyball for the Coastal Carolina Chanticleers in South Carolina beginning in 2020. However, after not fitting in by the end of her freshman year, she withdrew and returned home to Virginia to train with her old club, before accepting a scholarship from San Jose State University (SJSU) in 2022. While she told the Coach Trent Kersten that she was trans, she decided to wait until she knew her teammates better to tell them individually. A few players, however, had reportedly found out from staff that Fleming was transgender, leading to occasional rumors.

=== Brooke Slusser ===
Brooke Slusser (born January 9, 2003) was a setter, who had transferred to San Jose State in 2023 after playing for the Alabama Crimson Tide. Prior to that, she had been an All-American high school volleyball player in Denton, Texas, and had grown up in a Christian conservative household, with her biggest dream in life being to have children. In need of a place to live after transferring, she was recommended by head coach Todd Kress to move into an apartment with a group of three other players on the women's volleyball team, one of whom was Fleming. The four quickly formed a close friend group. Slusser and Fleming would regularly share a hotel room when traveling for away games.

=== Legal environment ===
While restrictions imposed on the National Collegiate Athletic Association (NCAA) by the second Trump administration have since banned trans women from women's sports, at the time Fleming played, it was still allowed under a 2011 NCAA policy for trans women to compete in women's sporting events provided they completed one year of testosterone suppression. This became more strict however in the early 2020s amid the rise of the anti-trans movement, with the criteria for trans women participation becoming stricter and stricter amidst the rise of figures like Riley Gaines. As of December 2024, there were "less than 10" transgender athletes out of the NCAA's 500,000, according to NCAA President Charlie Baker.

At the time, transgender women still received non-discrimination protections under Title IX of the Civil Rights Act, however those protections allowed for exceptions to be made in the case of sports participation.

== Initial incident ==
In 2024, a few months before Fleming's fourth season, an article by the radical feminist news outlet Reduxx was published outing Fleming as a trans woman, having pulled old Facebook photographs of Fleming and comments by Fleming's grandmother calling her a "grandson". This article was published following a tip by the mother of a girl that played against Fleming, who had told the publication that she'd suspected Fleming of being transgender.

Right-wing media was quick to pick up on the story, with the Fox-owned Outkick running more than 50 articles on the controversy over the course of the season, and before long it was turned into an epicenter for national news coverage. Slusser made several appearances on Fox News.

=== Lawsuits ===
In March 2024, class action lawsuit was filed by a group of cisgender female athletes led by Riley Gaines and the anti-trans sports organization ICONS against the NCAA. The plaintiffs claimed that by allowing a transgender woman to participate in sports, the NCAA had violated their rights under Title IX. Slusser joined the lawsuit in the fall of 2024, on the grounds that "If I had a daughter one day, that was in my position and I never did anything about it and could have, then I wouldn't have been able to live with myself."

In November 2024, a second lawsuit was filed by Slusser against the California State University System, the Mountain West Conference, and the SJSU women's volleyball coach. The lawsuit sought to have Fleming declared ineligible to participate in order to end her participation in the season early and vacate the Spartans' wins. This suit was joined by the Spartans' assistant coach, Melissa Batie-Smoose, who took personal discomfort with having a trans player on the team, and who later accused Fleming of colluding with players from Colorado State University. Magistrate Judge Kato Crews ruled that Fleming was allowed to play, and a federal appeals court upheld the decision the following day.

=== Protests ===
In a four-page letter to the presidents of the other Mountain West schools, ICONS demanded that their teams refuse to play against SJSU in order to "protect" their athletes. Shortly thereafter, five universities consisting of the Boise State Broncos, Wyoming Cowgirls, Utah State Aggies, Nevada Wolf Pack, and Southern Utah Thunderbirds, forfeited their women's volleyball games against SJSU in protest. Riley Gaines awarded "medals of courage" and "BOYcott" t-shirts to some of the athletes on teams that had forfeited.

In the games SJSU did play, protestors and counter protestors led to the team needing armed police escort to maintain their security.

San Jose State ended the 2024 season with a 14–7 record and advanced on a bye to the conference final after Boise State declined to play them in the conference semifinal. They were defeated by the Colorado State Rams in the conference final. Of the team's 12 regular season conference wins, six were by forfeit. In December 2024, seven team members entered the NCAA transfer portal.

=== Trump campaign ===
Following the campaign against her, Fleming's performance delivering spikes grew substantially in both strength and accuracy, leading up to a video in which Fleming delivered a spike which struck an opposing player in the arm. The player, Keira Herron, later told The New York Times that "The ball didn't hurt" and "Everyone gets hit in volleyball". Nevertheless, the Donald Trump presidential campaign seized on this, with Trump himself using it to promote bans on trans women from women's sports.

== Aftermath ==
Both Slusser and Fleming finished their final year of school remotely, while other transgender athletes reported their schools revoking opportunities for advancement or participation because, as The New York Times put it, "No school wanted to be the next San Jose State". Similarly, Ann Killion asked in a December 2024 San Francisco Chronicle column: "After seeing what San Jose State has been through, what school will be eager to include a transgender athlete, and suffer the uproar, lawsuits, legal fees and ensuing toxic environment?"

In 2025, Batie-Smoose filed a lawsuit against the California State University claiming wrongful termination; her contract with San Jose State expired in February that year.

=== Department of Education investigation ===
When Trump took office in January 2025, he quickly signed into effect Executive Order 14201, entitled "Keeping Men Out of Women's Sports" which subsequently forced the NCAA to announce in February that it was banning all trans women from women's competitions, effective immediately. In February 2025, the Department of Education (ED) announced that it was investigating San Jose State for allowing Fleming to be on the team.

In January 2026, the ED ruled that SJSU had violated Title IX and engaged in sex discrimination by allowing Fleming to play, and threatened "imminent enforcement action" if the university did not agree to adopt a definition of "male" and "female" solely defined by assigned sex at birth, segregate sports and intimate facilities according to said definition, agree not to contract with any entity that might violate Title IX in a similar way, restore to cis female athletes any awards potentially given to a transgender athlete over them and issue a personalized letter of apology to each one, and send a personalized apology letter to every woman that played in SJSU women's volleyball from 2022 to 2024.

In March 2026, San Jose State University and the California State University system refused the ED's demands and announced they would be suing the federal government to rescind the ruling and prevent punitive action from being taken against the university.

== See also ==
- 2020s anti-LGBTQ movement in the United States
- Persecution of transgender people under the second Trump administration
- Monarch High School transgender athlete investigation
- 2025 University of Oklahoma essay controversy
