= University of Oklahoma =

Public university in Norman, Oklahoma, U.S.

The University of Oklahoma
- Former name: Norman Territorial University (1890–1907)
- Motto: Latin: Civi et Reipublicae
- Motto in English: "For the benefit of the Citizen and the State"
- Type: Public research university
- Established: December 19, 1890; 135 years ago
- Parent institution: Oklahoma State System of Higher Education - Regents of the University of Oklahoma
- Accreditation: HLC
- Academic affiliations: ORAU; URA; space-grant
- Endowment: $1.81 billion (FY2024)
- President: Joseph Harroz Jr.
- Provost: André-Denis G. Wright
- Faculty: 3,752 (fall 2022)
- Administrative staff: 6,455 (fall 2022)
- Students: 34,523 (fall 2024); Norman: 30,873; HSC: 3,684; Tulsa: 1,127
- Undergraduates: 24,562 (fall 2024) by campus: Norman: 23,351; HSC: 1,216; Tulsa: 392
- Postgraduates: 9,961 (fall 2024) by campus: Norman: 7,522; HSC: 2,468; Tulsa: 735
- Location: Norman, Oklahoma, United States; 35.2088°N 97.4457°W
- Campus: 3,000 acres (12.1 km^{2}); Midsize suburb
- Other campuses: Oklahoma City; Tulsa
- Newspaper: The Oklahoma Daily
- Colors: Crimson and cream
- Nickname: Sooners
- Sporting affiliations: NCAA Division I FBS – SEC; Big 12; MPSF
- Mascot: Sooner Schooner
- Website: ou.edu

The University of Oklahoma (OU) is a public research university in Norman, Oklahoma, United States. Founded in 1890, it had existed in Oklahoma Territory near Indian Territory for 17 years before the two territories became the state of Oklahoma. In Fall 2024, the university had 34,523 students enrolled, most at its main campus in Norman. Employing nearly 4,000 faculty members, the university offers 174 baccalaureate programs, 199 master's programs, 101 doctoral programs, and 88 certificate programs.

The university is classified among "R1: Doctoral Universities – Very high research activity", with over $416 million in research expenditures across its three campuses in 2022. Its Norman campus has two prominent museums, the Fred Jones Jr. Museum of Art, specializing in French Impressionism and Native American artwork, and the Sam Noble Oklahoma Museum of Natural History, specializing in the natural history of Oklahoma.

The Oklahoma Sooners athletic teams compete in NCAA Division I FBS as a member of the Southeastern Conference. The Sooners have won 47 team national championships. Beginning with the 1932 Summer Olympics, Sooners have made 90 appearances at the Olympics and collected 23 medals in total.

== History ==
With the support of Governor George Washington Steele, on December 18, 1890, the Oklahoma Territorial legislature established three universities: the state university in Norman, the agricultural and mechanical college in Stillwater (later renamed Oklahoma State University) and a normal school in Edmond (later renamed University of Central Oklahoma). Oklahoma's admission into the union in 1907 led to the renaming of the Norman Territorial University as the University of Oklahoma. Norman residents donated 407 acres (1.6 km^{2}) of land for the university 0.5 miles (0.8 km) south of the Norman railroad depot. The university's first president ordered the planting of trees before the construction of the first campus building because he "could not visualize a treeless university seat." Landscaping remains important to the university.

The university's first president, David Ross Boyd, arrived in Norman in August 1892, and the first students enrolled that year. The university established a School of Pharmacy in 1893 because of the territory's high demand for pharmacists. Three years later, the university awarded its first degree to a pharmaceutical chemist. The "Rock Building" in downtown Norman held the initial classes until the university's first building opened on September 6, 1893.

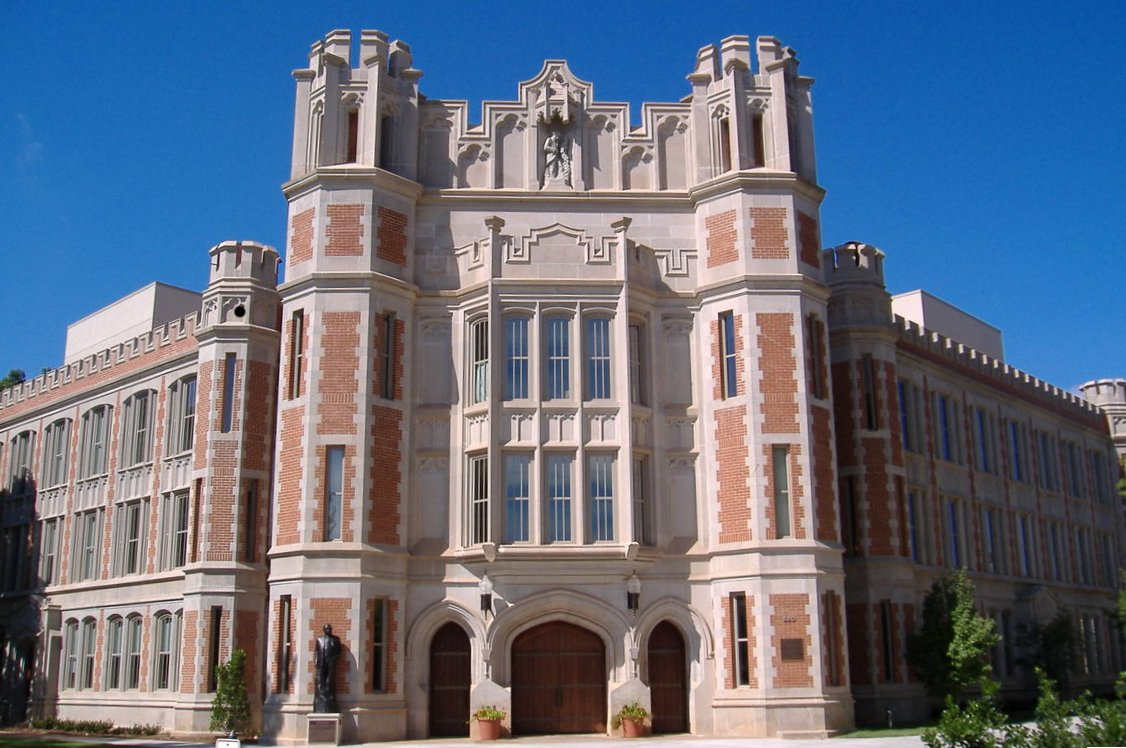
Donald W. Reynolds Center for the Performing Arts, formerly Holmberg Hall, exemplifies the school's architectural style.

On January 6, 1903, the university's only building burned down and destroyed many records of the early university. Construction began immediately on a new building, as several other towns hoped to convince the university to move. President Boyd and the faculty were not dismayed by the loss. Mathematics professor Frederick Elder said, "What do you need to keep classes going? Two yards of blackboard and a box of chalk." As a response to the fire, English professor Vernon Louis Parrington created a plan for the development of the campus. Although much of the plan was never implemented, Parrington's suggestion for the campus core formed the basis for the North Oval. The North and South Ovals are now distinctive features of the campus.

The campus has a distinctive architecture, with buildings designed in the unique "Cherokee Gothic" style, a term coined by American architect Frank Lloyd Wright when he visited the campus. These buildings are similar to Collegiate Gothic but are built from lighter stones. They combine conventional Gothic Revival architecture with Native American elements. The university has built over a dozen buildings in the Cherokee Gothic style.

Presidents of the
University of Oklahoma
- David Ross Boyd, 1892–1908
- A. Grant Evans, 1908–1912
- Stratton D. Brooks, 1912–1923
- James S. Buchanan, 1923–1925
- William Bennett Bizzell, 1925–1941
- Joseph A. Brandt, 1941–1943
- George Lynn Cross, 1943–1968
- John Herbert Hollomon, 1968–1970
- Paul F. Sharp, 1971–1977
- William S. Banowsky, 1978–1984
- Frank E. Horton, 1985–1988
- Richard L. Van Horn, 1989–1994
- David Boren, 1994–2018
- James L. Gallogly, 2018 – May 12, 2019
- Joseph Harroz Jr., 2019–present

In 1907, Oklahoma entered statehood, fostering changes in the state's political atmosphere. Up until this point, Oklahoma's Republican tendencies changed with the election of Oklahoma's first governor, the Democratic Charles N. Haskell. Since the university's inception, religion had divided those on campus. Early in the university's existence, many professors were Presbyterian, as was Boyd. Under pressure, Boyd hired several Baptists and Southern Methodists. The Presbyterians and Baptists coexisted but the Southern Methodists conflicted with the administration. Two notable Methodists, Nathaniel Lee Linebaugh and Ernest Taylor Bynum, were critics of Boyd and activists in Haskell's election campaign. When Haskell took office, he fired many of the university's Republicans, including President Boyd.

The campus expanded over the next several decades. By 1932, the university encompassed 167 acres (0.7 km^{2}). Development of South Oval allowed for the southern expansion of the campus. The university built a new library on the oval's north end in 1936. By convincing the Oklahoma legislature to increase their original pledge of $200,000 for the library to $500,000, President Bizzell ensured an even greater collection of research materials for students and faculty.

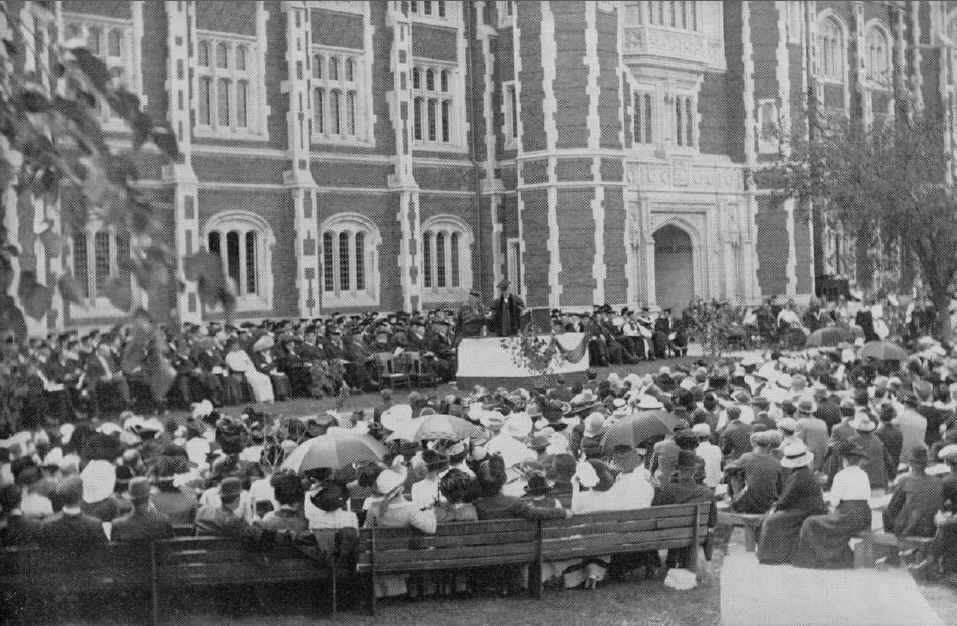
President Brooks' inauguration took place in front of Evans Hall in 1912.

Enrollment in 1945 dropped to 3,769, from its pre–World War II high of 6,935 in 1939.

The north campus and airfield were built in the early 1940s as Naval Air Station Norman. The station served mainly an advanced flight training mission and could handle all but the largest bombers. A large earthen mound east of Interstate 35 and north of Robinson Street, colloquially known as "Mount Williams", was a gunnery (the mound has been removed to make way for a commercial development). In the post–World War II demobilization, the university received the installation. Naval aviator's wings displayed at the entrance to the terminal commemorates this airfield's Naval past.

The southern portion of south campus near Constitution Avenue, still known to long-time Norman residents as "South Base", was originally built as an annex to the Naval Air Station. It contained mostly single-story frame buildings used for classrooms and military housing. By the late 1980s, most were severely deteriorated and were demolished in the 1990s to make room for redevelopment. The Jimmie Austin University of Oklahoma Golf Course was originally built as a U.S. Navy recreational facility.

During World War II, OU was one of 131 colleges and universities nationally that took part in the V-12 Navy College Training Program which offered students a path to a Navy commission.

in the post-war period, the university saw rapid growth and a surge in enrollment. By 1965, enrollment had risen over 450% to 17,268, causing housing shortages. In the mid-1960s, three new 12-story dormitories were erected immediately south of the South Oval. In addition to these three towers, an apartment complex for married students, including men returning to college under the GI Bill, was built.

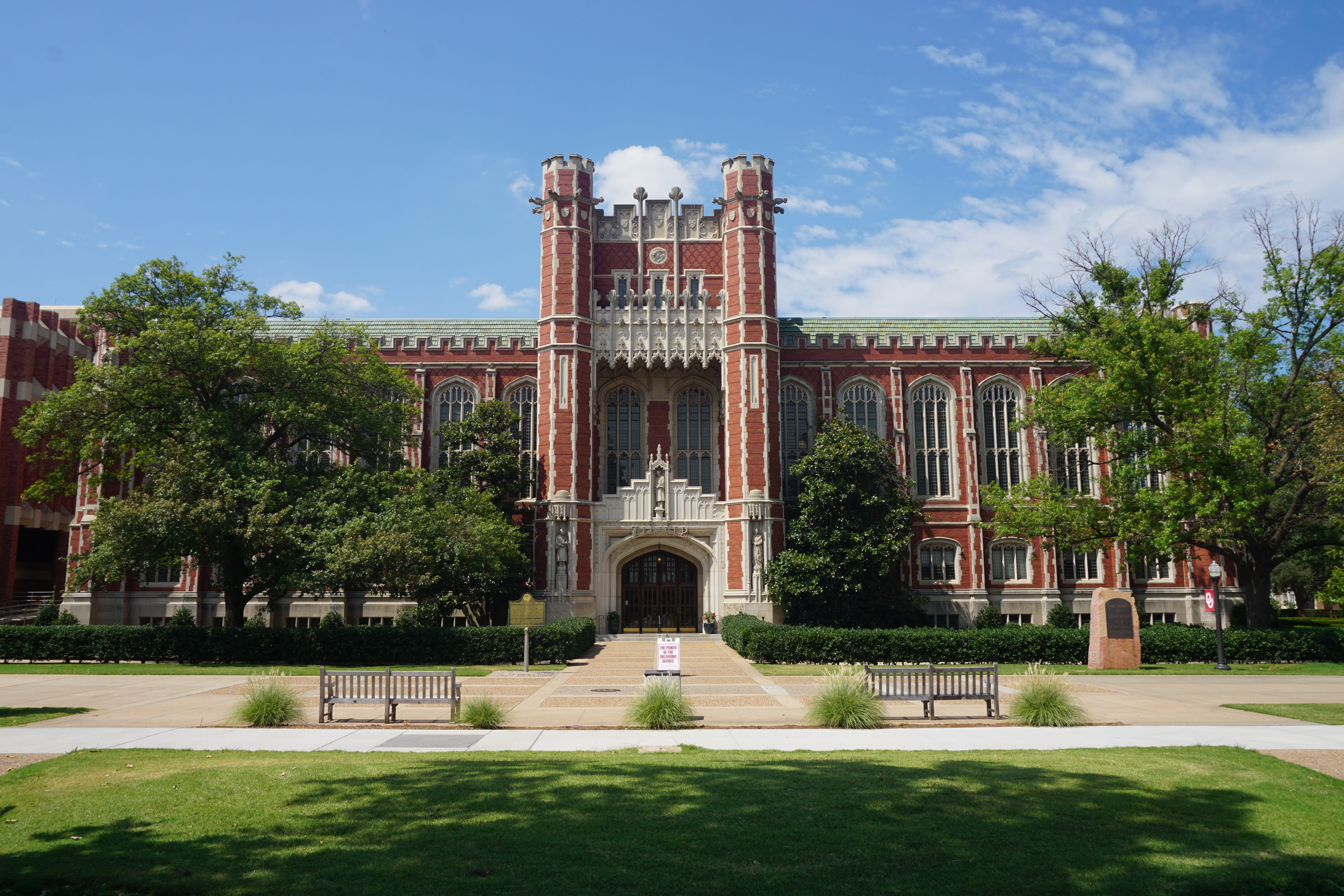
Bizzell Library sits at the heart of the university's Norman campus.

In 1943 George Lynn Cross took over as president of the university. He served until 1968, 25 years later.

The Civil Rights Movement began a new era as the university began policies against racial discrimination and segregation after legal challenges and court cases outlawed discrimination. The Bizzell Memorial Library has been designated a U.S. National Historic Landmark in commemoration of the cases of G. W. McLaurin, a black man denied admission to graduate school in 1948. A court case effectively forced the Board of Regents to vote to admit McLaurin, but he was directed to study in a separate area within the law library and to be allowed to lunch only in a segregated area. The National Association for Advancement of Colored People brought the case to the U.S. Supreme court in McLaurin vs. Oklahoma State Board of Regents. In 1950, the court overturned the university's policy for segregation at the graduate school level. The case was an important precedent for the more famous and sweeping 1954 case of Brown v. Board of Education which disallowed "separate but equal" policy at all school levels.

Since David Boren became president in 1994, the University of Oklahoma system has experienced tremendous growth and purchased 60 acres (0.2 km^{2}) for OU-Tulsa, the new Gaylord Hall, Price Hall, the ExxonMobil Lawrence G. Rawl Engineering Practice Facility, Devon Energy Hall, the Wagner Student Academic Services Center, the Research and Medical Clinic, the expansions of the Fred Jones Jr. Museum of Art, and the National Weather Center.

In March 2015, the University of Oklahoma shut down the Oklahoma Kappa chapter of the Sigma Alpha Epsilon fraternity when a video surfaced that showed members singing a racist chant as they rode a bus. University of Oklahoma president David Boren gave members two days to leave the fraternity house. He also expelled two students who he said, "played a leadership role" in the incident, creating "a hostile learning environment for others". The expulsion, allegedly without due process, earned the university a spot on the Foundation for Individual Rights in Education's 2016 "10 Worst Colleges for Free Speech".

David Boren, a former U.S. senator and Governor of Oklahoma, served as the university's president from 1994 to 2018. James L. Gallogly succeeded Boren on July 1, 2018, only to retire ten months later. OU College of Law Dean Joseph Harroz Jr. was appointed effective immediately May 16, 2019, to a 15-month term as interim president. On May 9, 2020, Harroz was announced as the 15th president of the university by the Board of Regents.

=== Second Trump administration ===
Following the second inauguration of Donald Trump as President of the United States, and the creation of the Department of Government Efficiency (DOGE) on January 20, 2025, several major changes occurred across the United States, including changes to the National Oceanic and Atmospheric Administration and to OU. These changes to the University of Oklahoma included employees being terminated, protests on campus, threats from the federal government of lease terminations, and grants being terminated. Shortly after the firings, William Alsup, Senior Judge of the United States District Court for the Northern District of California, ruled that the OPM "had no authority to order the firings of probationary employees". The Supreme Court of the United States later stayed Alsup's ruling.

On March 3, The Verge & Axios reported leaked information from DOGE saying, NOAA was planning to terminate the building lease for the Radar Operations Center's building at the University of Oklahoma Westheimer Airport. On March 5, M. Scott Carter, the chief political reporter for The Oklahoman, reported that the National Weather Center is among many Oklahoma offices that have been included on a Department of Government Efficiency list of federal buildings to be closed. On March 17, ABC News, reporting from the word of an anonymous NOAA spokesperson, stated the Storm Prediction Center (SPC), located in National Weather Center, was set to be closed by DOGE.

In March 2025, the United States’ Office of Management and Budget (OMB) released a seven-page proposed budget for NOAA in 2026. The proposed budget was proposed to cut 27.28% of NOAA's budget in order to "eliminate functions of the Department that are misaligned with the President's agenda and the expressed will of the American people". The Office of Oceanic and Atmospheric Research (OAR) had a 73.86% budget cut proposed, which would "eliminate all funding for climate, weather, and ocean Laboratories and Cooperative Institutes. It also does not fund Regional Climate Data and Information, Climate Competitive Research, Sea Grant (College and Aquaculture), or the National Oceanographic Partnership Program. This includes the complete defunding of the National Severe Storms Laboratory (NSSL) and the Cooperative Institute for Severe and High-Impact Weather Research and Operations (CIWRO), both located at the National Weather Center on the university campus.

In April 2025, the United States government terminated the visas of over 1,000 international students, particularly pro-Palestine supporting international students and academics, for possible deportation. Several OU student visas were among those terminated, however, OU never released how many were terminated. On April 25, the Department of Justice announced the U.S. Immigration and Customs Enforcement (ICE) "is working on a new system regarding international students studying in the U.S. and, until the system is issued, no students will have their student visas revoked".

On May 3, one day after the second protest at OU, the Department of Government Efficiency announced that it had terminated a $300,519 grant for OU from the National Science Foundation that was for "collaborative research" for the "understanding [of] the evolution of political campaign advertisements over the last century". DOGE announced it saved the United States government $124,466.78 by terminating the grant.

In December 2025, the university received national media attention for firing a transgender teaching assistant who assigned a failing grade to a student who didn't appropriately complete an assignment. The university categorized the assistant's grade as inadequate when defending the firing.

== Campuses ==
Map of the Norman campuses excluding the north campus

=== Norman campus ===
As of Fall of 2024, the Norman campus had 23,351 undergraduate students and 7,522 postgraduate students.

Following the Sooners' 2000 football national-championship season the university experienced an increase in college applicants and admissions. The falls of 1999 and 2000 both saw a 1.3% increase in the number of students over the respective previous years, while fall 2001 saw an increase of 4.8% over 2000.

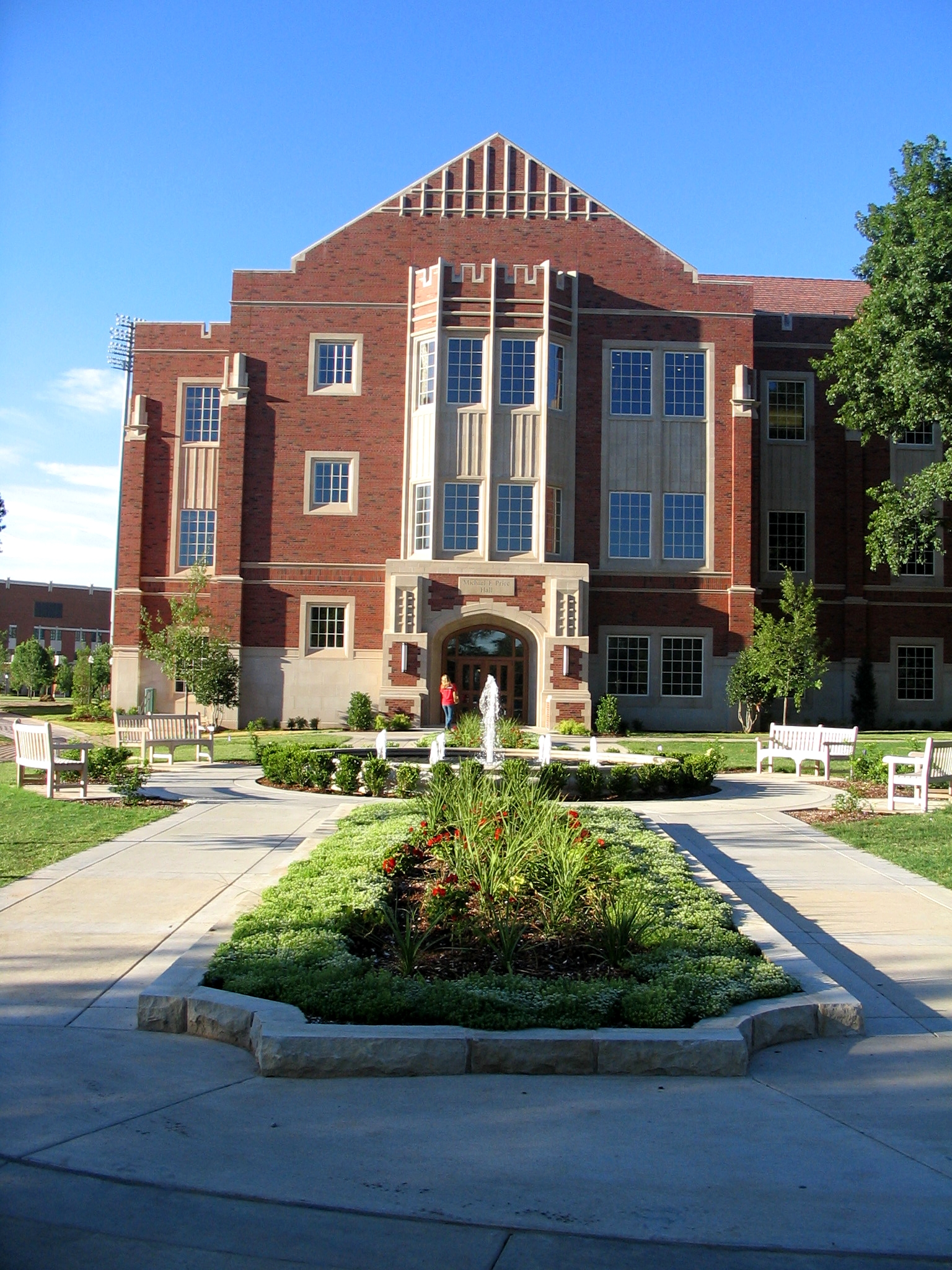
Price Hall, an addition to the Michael F. Price College of Business, finished construction in 2005.

The largest school, the College of Arts and Sciences, enrolls 35.2% of the OU-Norman students. The College of Arts & Sciences offers several programs, which include internships and a joint archaeological program (with Saint Anselm College of Goffstown, New Hampshire) in Orvieto, Italy. The next largest school, the Price College of Business enrolls 13%. Other large colleges on the Norman campus include the College of Engineering with 10.6% and the College of Education, Gaylord College of Journalism and Mass Communication, and College of Liberal Studies, each with approximately 6% of the student body.

Smaller schools include the Colleges of Architecture and Atmospheric and Geographic Sciences, Earth and Energy, the Weitzenhoffer Family College of Fine Arts, and the College of Law.

The Norman campus has three sections: north campus, main campus, and south campus. All three are connected by a bus service funded by student fees which allows students to park at Lloyd Noble Center and provides 5- to 10-minute service to the main and south campuses. Other regular Norman bus routes provide service to north campus as well as the main campus. The main and south campus are contiguous while the north campus is about two miles north of the main campus.

The Norman campus is the focus of a number of ghost stories, some negative, some positive.

==== Main campus ====
The main campus is bordered by Boyd Street on the north, Timberdell Road on the south, Chautauqua Avenue on the west, and Jenkins Avenue on the east. The Norman campus is centered on two large "ovals." The Parrington Oval (or North Oval as it is commonly called) is anchored on the south by Evans Hall, the main administrative building. This building highlights the "Cherokee Gothic" style of architecture locally derived from the Collegiate Gothic style, the style that dominates and defines the older buildings on the OU campus. The North Oval is bordered on the east by the Oklahoma Memorial Union.

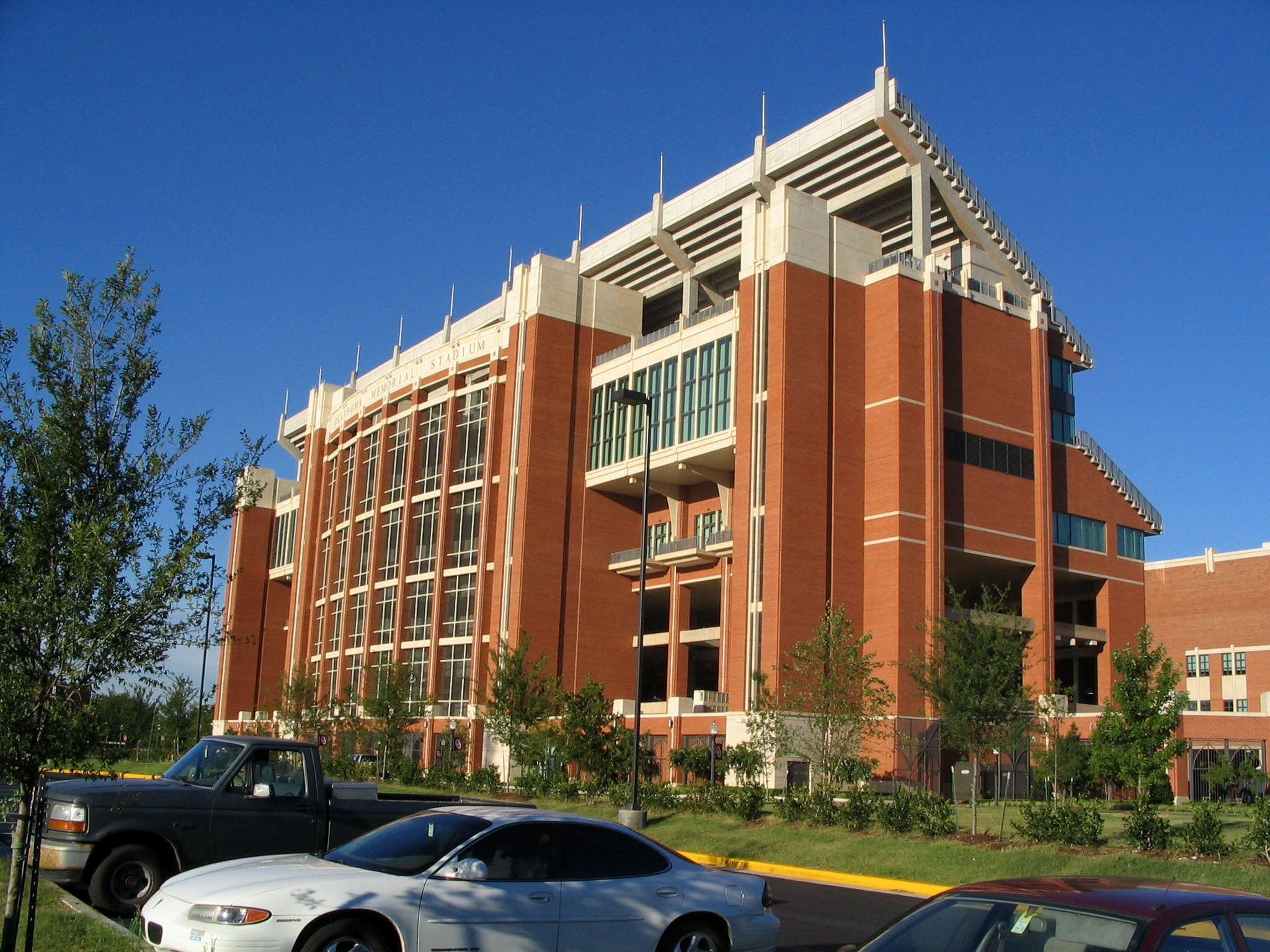
Memorial Stadium houses University of Oklahoma football games, as well as the campus bookstore.

On the east side of the northernmost part of campus sits Sarkeys Energy Center while to the west is the Fred Jones, Jr. School of Art and Fred Jones Jr. Museum of Art, home to the Weitzenhoffer Collection of Impressionist art and the Catlett Music Center. Just south of Catlett is Goddard Health Center, an on-campus clinic that provides medical care and counseling and testing services to students, faculty, staff, and their dependents. Goddard comprises the OU Health Services laboratory, Counseling Services, Health Promotion, and a pharmacy. The Van Vleet Oval (or South Oval) is anchored on the north by the Bizzell Memorial Library and flanked by academic buildings. Elm Avenue bounds the western edge of the academic portion of OU, with a few exceptions. Lying between Elm Avenue and Chautauqua Avenue are mostly fraternity and sorority houses.

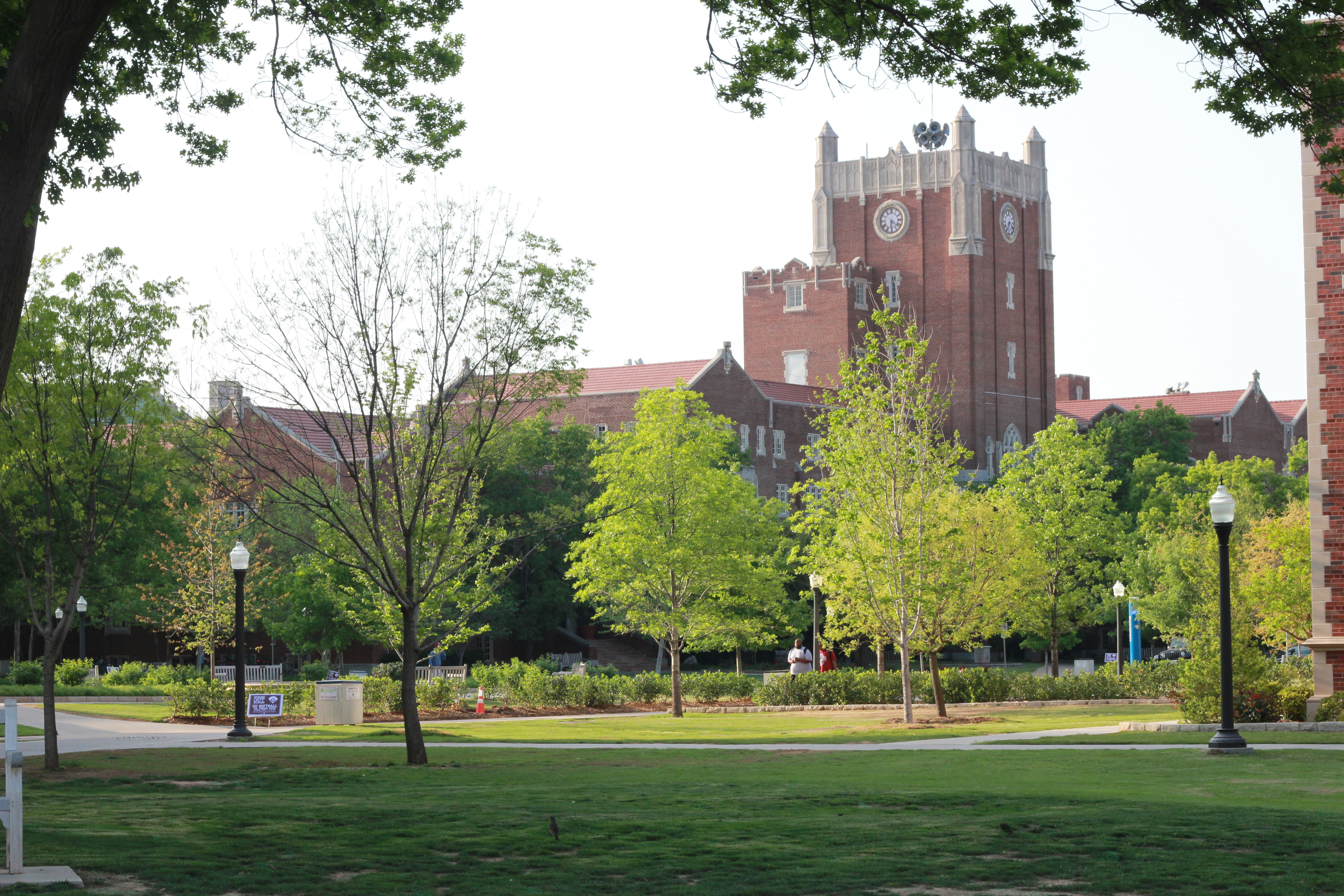
Oklahoma Memorial Union

On the east side of the central part of campus lies Gaylord Family Oklahoma Memorial Stadium, just north of Lindsey Street on Jenkins Avenue. Immediately adjacent to the stadium is the Barry Switzer Center, a museum highlighting the historical success of Oklahoma athletics, as well as a comprehensive training facility for Oklahoma athletes. North of the stadium is the McCasland Field House, the former home of Oklahoma Basketball and the current home of Oklahoma's wrestling, volleyball and gymnastics programs. Across Jenkins Avenue are the athletic dorms and statues honoring Oklahoma's past seven Heisman Trophy winners. Other statues on campus include several honoring the Native Americans who defined much of Oklahoma's history and a new memorial statue on the north side of Oklahoma Memorial Stadium honoring OU students, faculty, and staff that have died while serving in the armed forces.

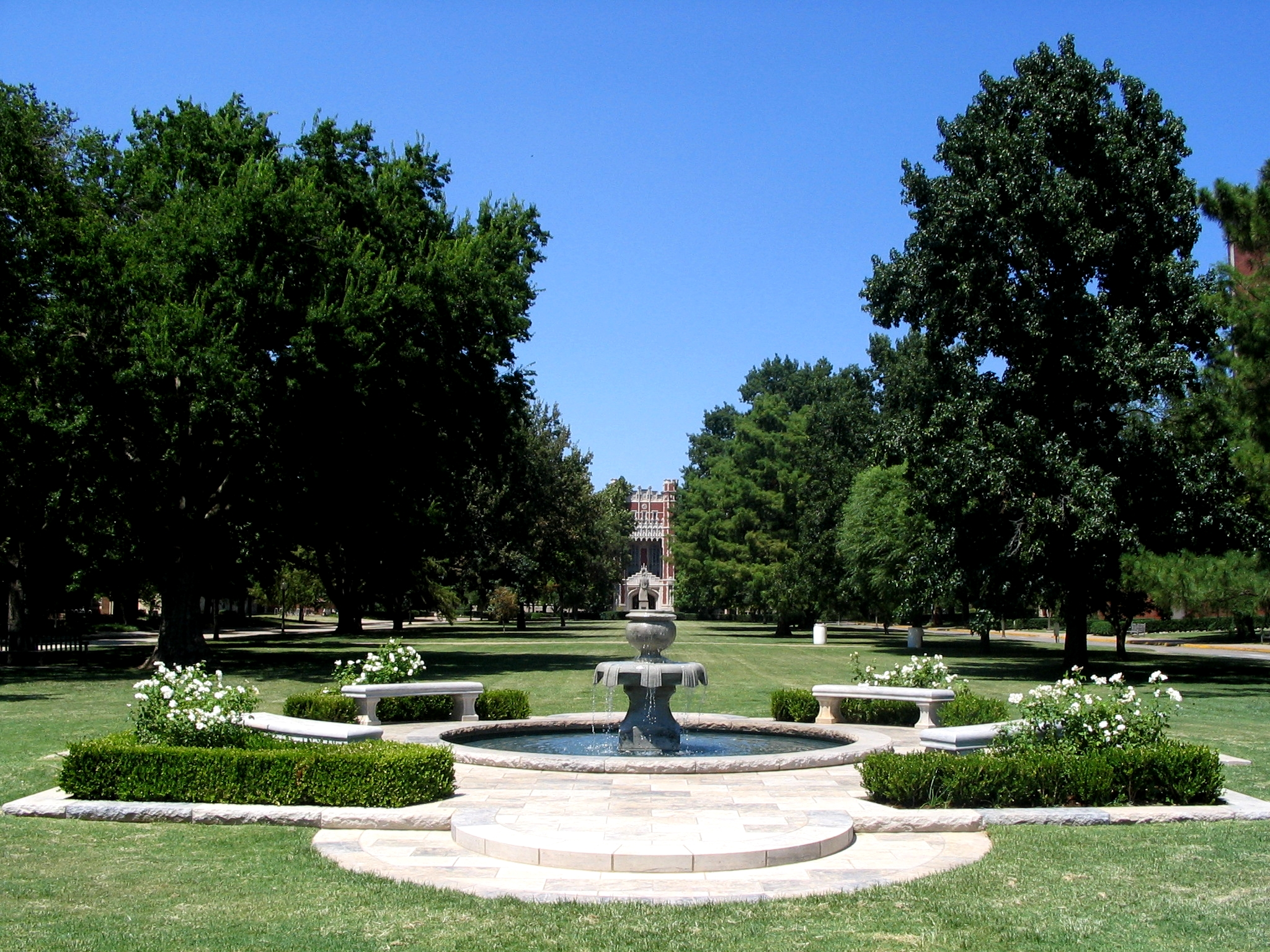
South Oval with Bizzell Library in the background

The portion of OU's main campus south of Lindsey Street includes three colleges, university housing, student activity and fitness facilities, and the Oklahoma Center for Continuing Education. The Joe C. and Carole Kerr McClendon Honors College is in David L. Boren Hall, which serves as an Academic Arts Community where residential rooms, faculty offices, classrooms, a computer center and library are all available in the same building. Other residence halls include the twelve-story Adams, Couch and Walker Centers, as well as Cate Center, made up of three- and four-story buildings, which are transitioning to faculty offices.

Adjacent to the residence facilities are the Sarkeys Fitness Center (formerly the Houston Huffman Fitness Center), Henderson-Tolson Cultural Center and the Jim Thorpe Multicultural Center. The Murray Case Sells Swim Complex is also nearby, providing indoor and outdoor swimming opportunities for the OU community. The Oklahoma Center for Continuing Education (OCCE) is one of eleven W. K. Kellogg Foundation-funded centers in the United States and Britain. It is home to OU Outreach, which consists of the College of Continuing Education and the College of Liberal Studies, and includes a conference center able to host events of up to 1500 participants.

The Oklahoma administration prides itself on the aesthetic appeal of the campus. All three campuses (Norman, Oklahoma City, and Tulsa) have landscaped gardens. Trees were planted on the OU campus before the first building was ever built. There are also many statues and sculptures around campus, most of which portray the strong influence of the Native American culture.

There are also four buildings on the main campus that are listed on the National Register of Historic Places: the Bizzell Library, the Beta Theta Pi fraternity house, Casa Blanca (the old Alpha Chi Omega sorority house), and Boyd House–the residence of the university president.

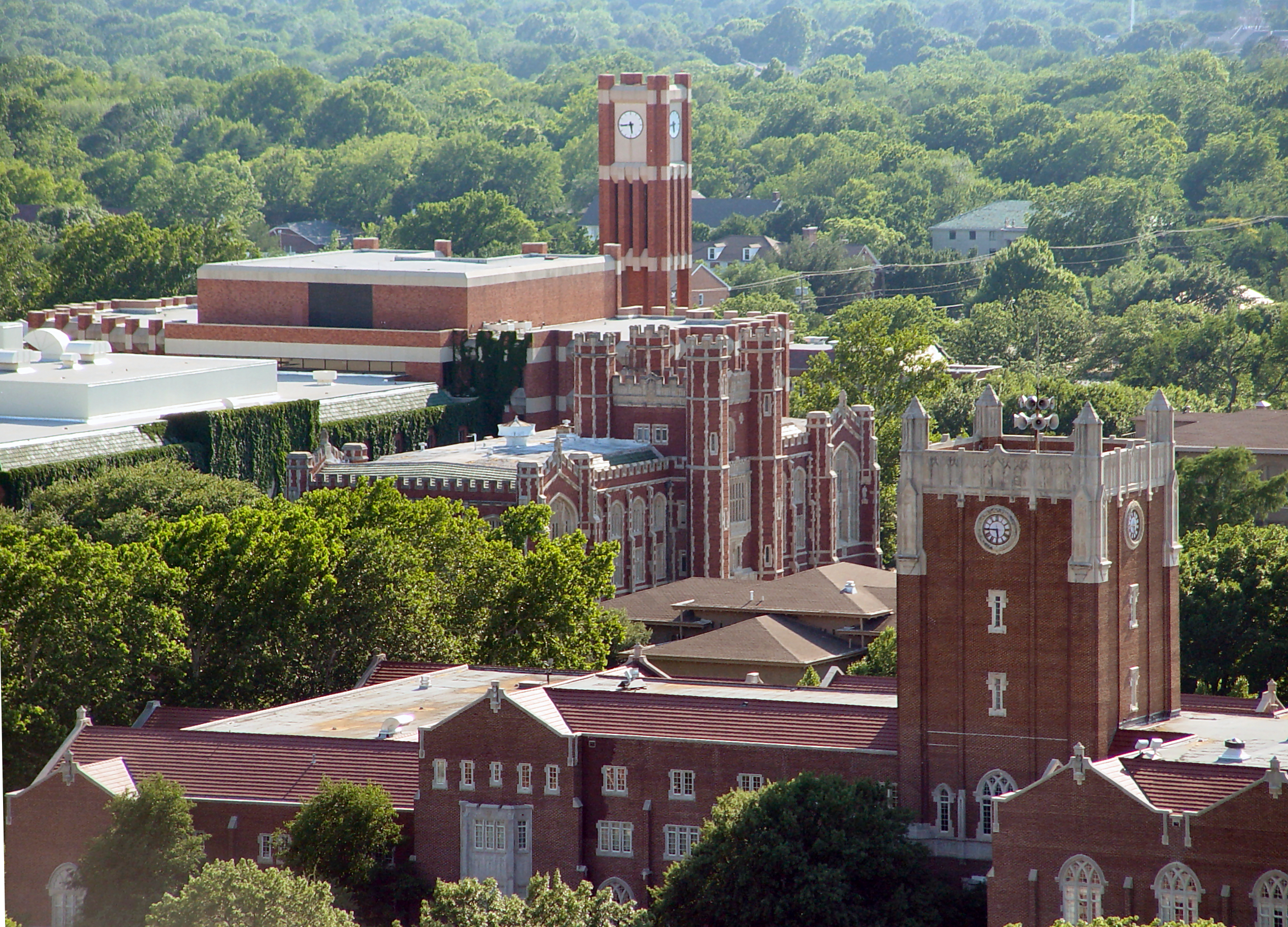
Several campus buildings seen from Sarkeys Energy Center

In September 2008, it was announced that the University of Oklahoma's main campus will be entirely powered by wind by 2013. According to OU president David Boren, "It is our patriotic duty as Americans to help our country achieve energy independence and to be sound stewards of the environment." The school plans to purchase its energy from the OU Spirit Wind Farm, which is scheduled for construction near Woodward in late 2009. The new source of energy is projected to cost the university an additional $5 million per year.

The Anne and Henry Zarrow School of Social Work was completed on the Norman campus in 2011 and houses facilities for the training of undergraduate and graduate social workers. The 12 million dollar building is named for the Zarrow family, a philanthropic couple from Tulsa, Oklahoma. The Zarrows donated $5 million as the keystone donors for the new building with the remaining funds coming from a bequest of Ruth I. Knee, a graduate of the program, and a portion of the state's federal stimulus funds.

==== North campus ====
On the far north side of Norman is the OU Research Campus-North, which includes University of Oklahoma Max Westheimer Airport (ICAO: KOUN), the Radar Operations Center, the old National Severe Storms Laboratory facility, the OU OKDHS Training and Research Center, and Merrick Computer and Technology Center. Additional research facilities as part of OU's Gallogly College of Engineering also operate out of North campus including the High-Speed Aerothermodynamics Laboratory, Measurement and Automation Laboratory, Laboratory for Electrical Energy and Power Systems, and Laboratory for Smart Buildings.

OU's College of Aviation runs a programs in the education of future pilots, air traffic controllers and aviation industry professionals. The Aviation Accreditation Board has accredited the College of Aviation at North Base as one of only 29 accredited colleges in the world.

==== South campus ====
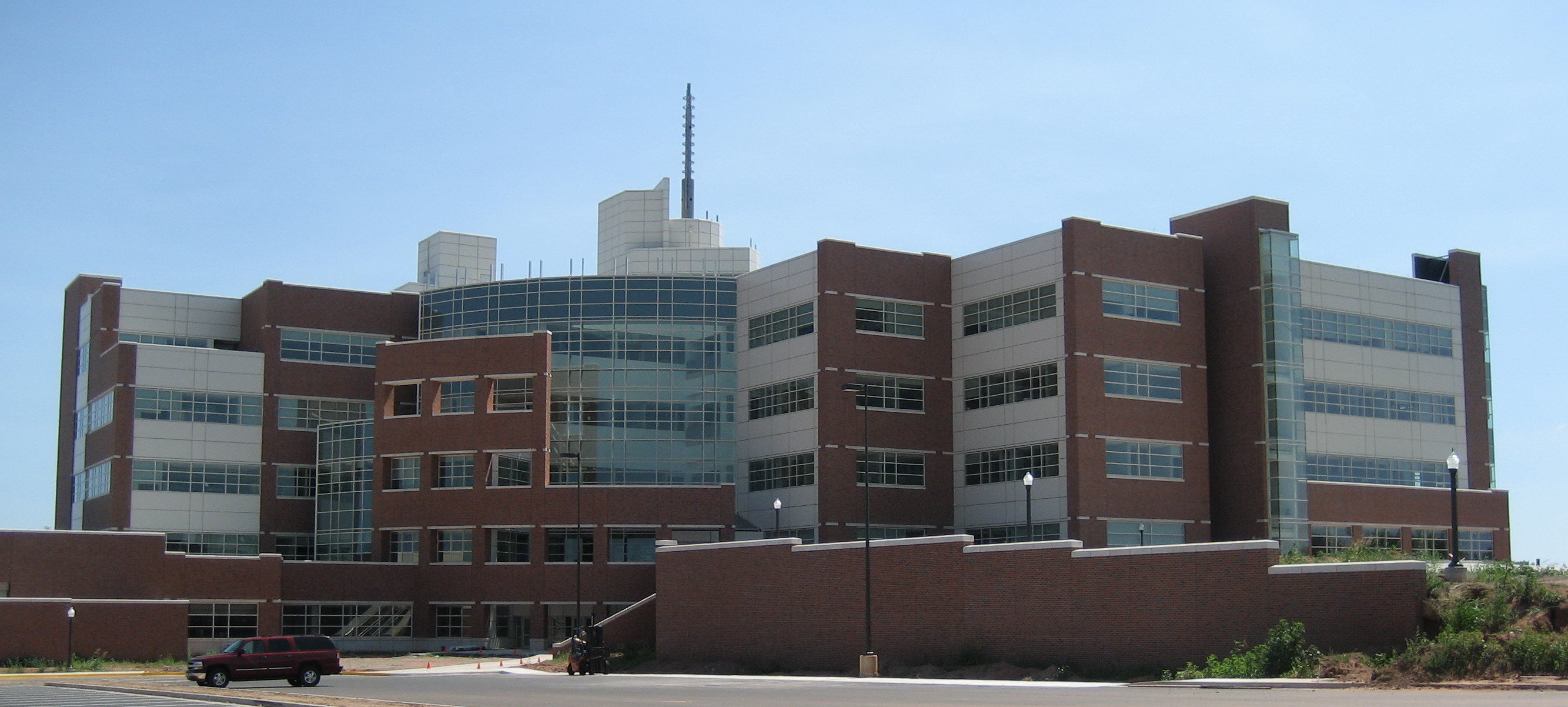
The National Weather Center is based on the university's south campus.

South of student housing is Timberdell Road, the approximate southern boundary of the university. South of this road are University-owned apartments and athletic complexes. Also on the south side of Timberdell Road is the College of Law building which was expanded in 2002 by the addition of a larger law library and courtroom. There are additional athletic complexes in this area, including L. Dale Mitchell Baseball Park, the OU Softball Field, and Lloyd Noble Center (the basketball arena).

==== Research campus ====
While this area has traditionally lacked academic buildings, the pressure of expansion in the northern part of campus led recently to the construction of new academic buildings–such as the National Weather Center and Stephenson Research and Technology Center–on the south end of campus. This area, now termed The University of Oklahoma's Research Campus, "brings academic, public and private sector organizations together in a mutually beneficial collaborative environment."

In 2004, global weather information provider WeatherNews opened its U.S. Operations Center in One Partners Place, in the research campus one block from the new NWC building. The southern boundary of the research campus is State Highway 9. OU's Advanced Radar Research Center is also on the Research campus in its new Radar Innovations Laboratory building.

As of 2013 the Life Sciences Research Center has opened, housing numerous chemical and biochemical research labs. Other buildings on the research campus include One Partners Place, Two Partners Place, Three Partners Place, Four Partners Place, and Five Partners Place. Housed within these buildings are the Center for Spatial Analysis and the Center for Applied Social Research among several others.

=== Health Sciences Center ===
The University of Oklahoma Health Sciences Center's main campus is at the Oklahoma Health Center in Oklahoma City, while a secondary Health Sciences campus is in Tulsa. About 3,500 students enroll in one of the seven colleges at the Health Center. The distribution of students in each of these colleges is more uniform than that of the main campus.

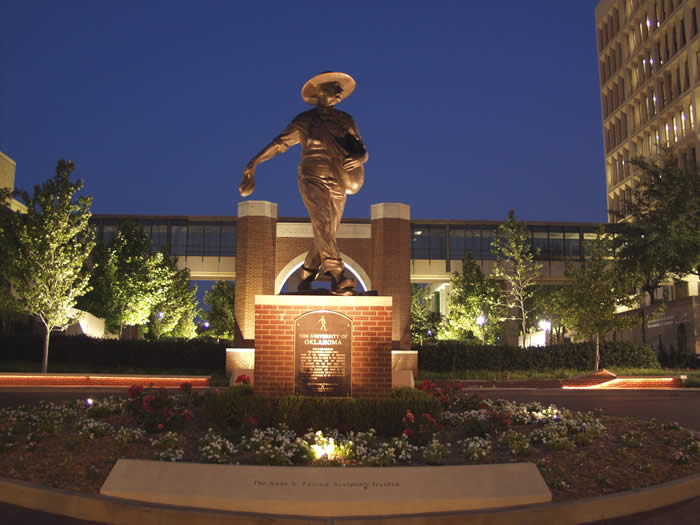
OUHSC at night

The University of Oklahoma Health Sciences Center (OUHSC), established in the early 20th century, is OU's presence in Oklahoma City. OUHSC is one of only four academic health centers in the nation with seven professional colleges. The nineteen buildings that make up the OUHSC campus occupies a fifteen block area in Oklahoma City near the Oklahoma State Capitol. Surrounding these buildings are an additional twenty health-related buildings some of which are owned by the University of Oklahoma. With approximately 600 students and 600 residents and fellows training in specialties and subspecialties of medicine, the College of Medicine is the largest part of the Health Sciences Center. The major clinical facilities on campus are the OU Medical Center hospital complex, which and include The Children's Hospital, the OU Physicians clinics, and the Oklahoma City Veterans Administration Medical Center. The Oklahoma Health Center at large has large, university-operated biomedical research facilities joined on campus by a growing biomedical and pharmaceutical research corporations developed by the Presbyterian Health Foundation, dedicated to biotechnology, research, and new scientific ventures.

=== University of Oklahoma-Tulsa Schusterman Center ===
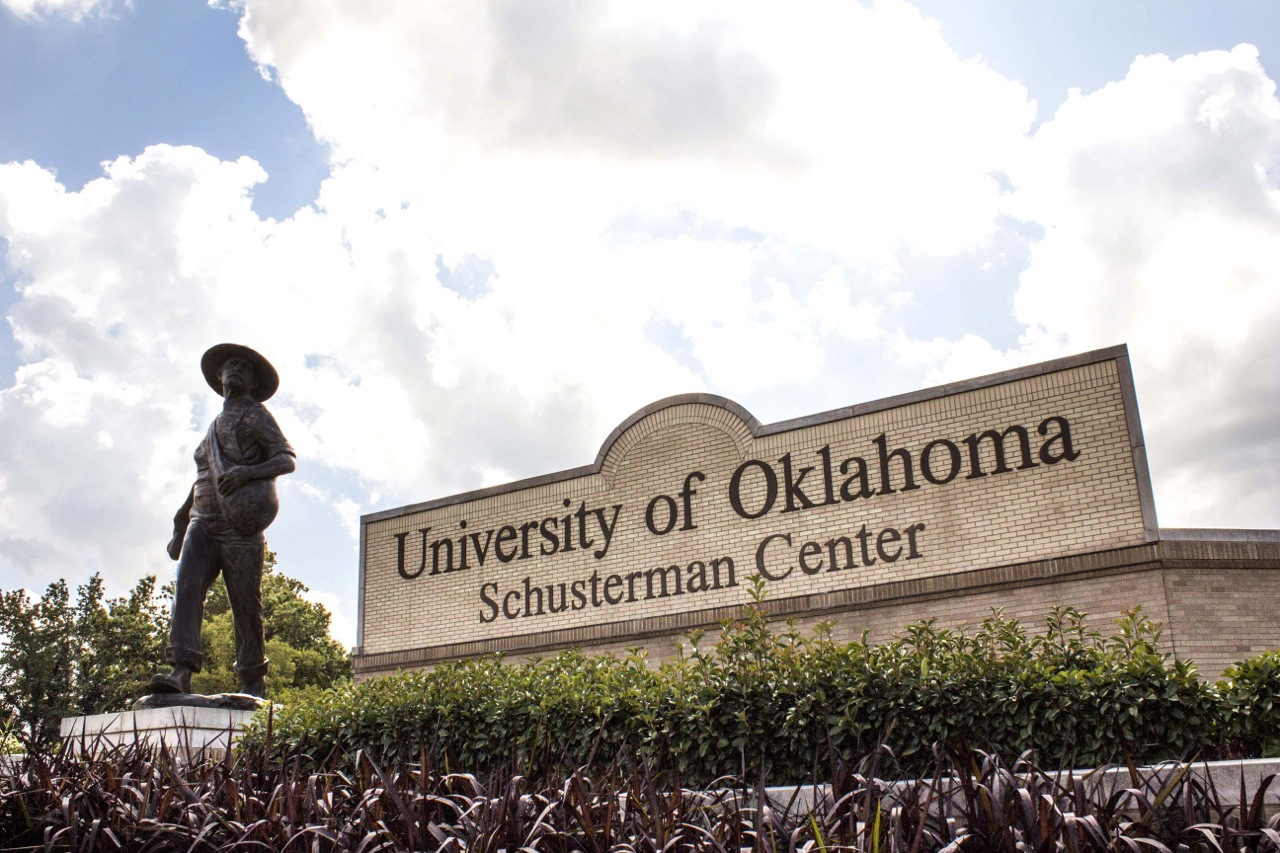
OU-Tulsa Seedsower at the corner of 41st and Yale in Tulsa

The University of Oklahoma-Tulsa Schusterman Center (OU-Tulsa) is home to all OU programs in Tulsa, OU Physicians-Tulsa, and the School of Community Medicine, offering Norman-based and Health Sciences Center (HSC) programs and granting degrees from those campuses even in Tulsa. OU-Tulsa offers six bachelor's degree completion programs; 14 master's degree programs; doctoral programs in medicine, physical therapy, education, early childhood education, engineering and nursing, as well as nine residency programs in medicine. Graduate certificate programs are also offered at OU-Tulsa.

More than 200 full-time faculty teach OU-Tulsa students and enrollment at OU-Tulsa exceeds 1,600 students. More than 1,000 employees work at the OU-Tulsa Schusterman Center and OU Physicians medical clinics throughout Tulsa. OU-Tulsa has service, education and research affiliations with more than 100 community agencies.

==== Norman-based programs ====
Programs offered at OU-Tulsa that are affiliated with departments on the Norman (main) campus of OU are referred to as Norman-based programs even when offered at OU-Tulsa. Norman-based programs on the Tulsa campus are primarily graduate level programs although an undergraduate degree completion program in Social Work is now being offered. Masters and doctoral level graduate programs as well as graduate certificate programs affiliated with a number of colleges on the Norman campus are offered on the Tulsa campus. The College of Arts and Sciences is the largest college on the Tulsa campus and includes programs in Human Relations, Library and Information Studies, Organizational Dynamics, Public Administration, and Social Work. Some graduate programs offered at OU-Tulsa are unique to the Tulsa campus such as Urban Design and Organizational Dynamics. Norman-based programs offered in Tulsa are predominately professional programs that include non-traditional scheduling formats such as evening and compressed format weekend courses to support the needs of working adults.

==== Health-science programs ====
Established in 1972 as a branch of the main Health Sciences Center campus in Oklahoma City, the OU School of Community Medicine, formerly the College of Medicine–Tulsa, has enabled the university to establish medical residencies and provide for expanded health care capabilities in the state. Between 1972 and 1999, OU's presence in Tulsa had grown but scattered. In 1999, a 60-acre (24 ha) site formerly owned by BP Amoco was sold to the university for $24 million (even though the property was appraised at $48 million). The site already featured a 370,000 square feet (34,370 m^{2}) building with offices, labs, and classrooms. The university purchased this property with the help of a $10 million gift from the Charles and Lynn Schusterman Family Foundation. The existing building was renamed the Schusterman Center. This historic, 60-acre property in the heart of Tulsa features original mid-century architecture surrounded by nearly 1,000 trees. New construction of the Schusterman Library and Schusterman Learning Center at OU-Tulsa has been designed in keeping with the original building style.

In 2003, Tulsa voters approved the Vision 2025 plan for capital improvements to the Tulsa metro area. Included in this plan was $30 million for a new Research and Medical Clinic near the existing Schusterman Center. Construction on the new building, the OU Schusterman Clinic, was completed in June 2007.

OU-Tulsa is also home to the OU School of Community Medicine. Created with the support of a $50 million donation from the George Kaiser Family Foundation, the school's mission is to improve the health of all Oklahomans, particularly the urban and rural underserved.

The OU School of Community Medicine faculty comprises around 200 physicians representing a wide field of specialties. These doctors also form the OU Physicians medical practice group, which provides care to patients at some 25 clinic sites in the Tulsa area. The faculty's time is split among teaching medical students, supervising medical residents and providing patient care.

=== OU in Arezzo ===
In 2012, The University of Oklahoma purchased a monastery in Arezzo, Italy. In early 2016, renovations to the monastery neared completion and OU began the use of its newest permanent "campus" (denominated as a "Study Center") location outside of the state of Oklahoma. The university expects that one in five OU students who study abroad will go through the Arezzo campus. The Arezzo campus has been described by university president, David Boren, as a first step for students and their parents to become acquainted with the world and gain an educational experience in a foreign land. The campus is scheduled to be dedicated in the summer of 2016. Boren chose the smaller town of Arezzo in part because of the small size of the town relative to nearby Florence, which boasts programs from about 50 American universities. With such a large number of American college students in Florence, Boren was concerned that OU students would have socialized with other Americans rather than the local Italians.

=== Other study centers ===
OU has study centers in Puebla, Mexico, and Rio de Janeiro, Brazil. A center is planned for İzmir, Turkey.

== Academics ==
Academic rankings

National
- Forbes: 113
- U.S. News & World Report: 110 (tie)
- Washington Monthly: 205
- WSJ/College Pulse: 142

Global
- ARWU: 401–500
- QS: 664
- U.S. News & World Report: 528 (tie)

National Program Rankings
| Program | Ranking |
|---|---|
| Biological Sciences | 112 |
| Business | 85 |
| Chemistry | 96 |
| Computer Science | 111 |
| Earth Sciences | 54 |
| Economics | 90 |
| Education | 79 |
| Engineering | 114 |
| English | 77 |
| Fine Arts | 158 |
| Health Care Management | 55 |
| History | 63 |
| Law | 76 |
| Library & Information Studies | 28 |
| Mathematics | 74 |
| Medicine: Primary Care | 63 |
| Medicine: Research | 70 |
| Pharmacy | 31 |
| Physician Assistant | 46 |
| Physics | 83 |
| Political Science | 61 |
| Psychology | 131 |
| Public Affairs | 72 |
| Public Health | 62 |
| Social Work | 77 |
| Sociology | 75 |

Global Program Rankings
| Program | Ranking |
|---|---|
| Engineering | 530 |
| Environment/Ecology | 187 |
| Geosciences | 127 |
| Physics | 290 |
| Plant and Animal Sciences | 412 |
| Social Sciences & Public Health | 443 |
| Space Science | 227 |

The University of Oklahoma is a large residential, research university. The university consists of fifteen colleges, including 174 majors. Native American studies includes language classes in Cherokee, Choctaw, Mvskoke, and Kiowa as part of the university's Native American language program; currently Creek, Choctaw, and Cherokee I, II, and III are offered in both fall and spring semesters. The university has a high four-year full-time undergraduate enrollment including a high transfer-in population. While the two main campuses are in Norman and Oklahoma City, affiliated programs in Tulsa expand access for students in eastern Oklahoma. Some of the programs in Tulsa include: architecture, arts and sciences, education, engineering, medicine, nursing, public health, allied health and liberal arts studies.

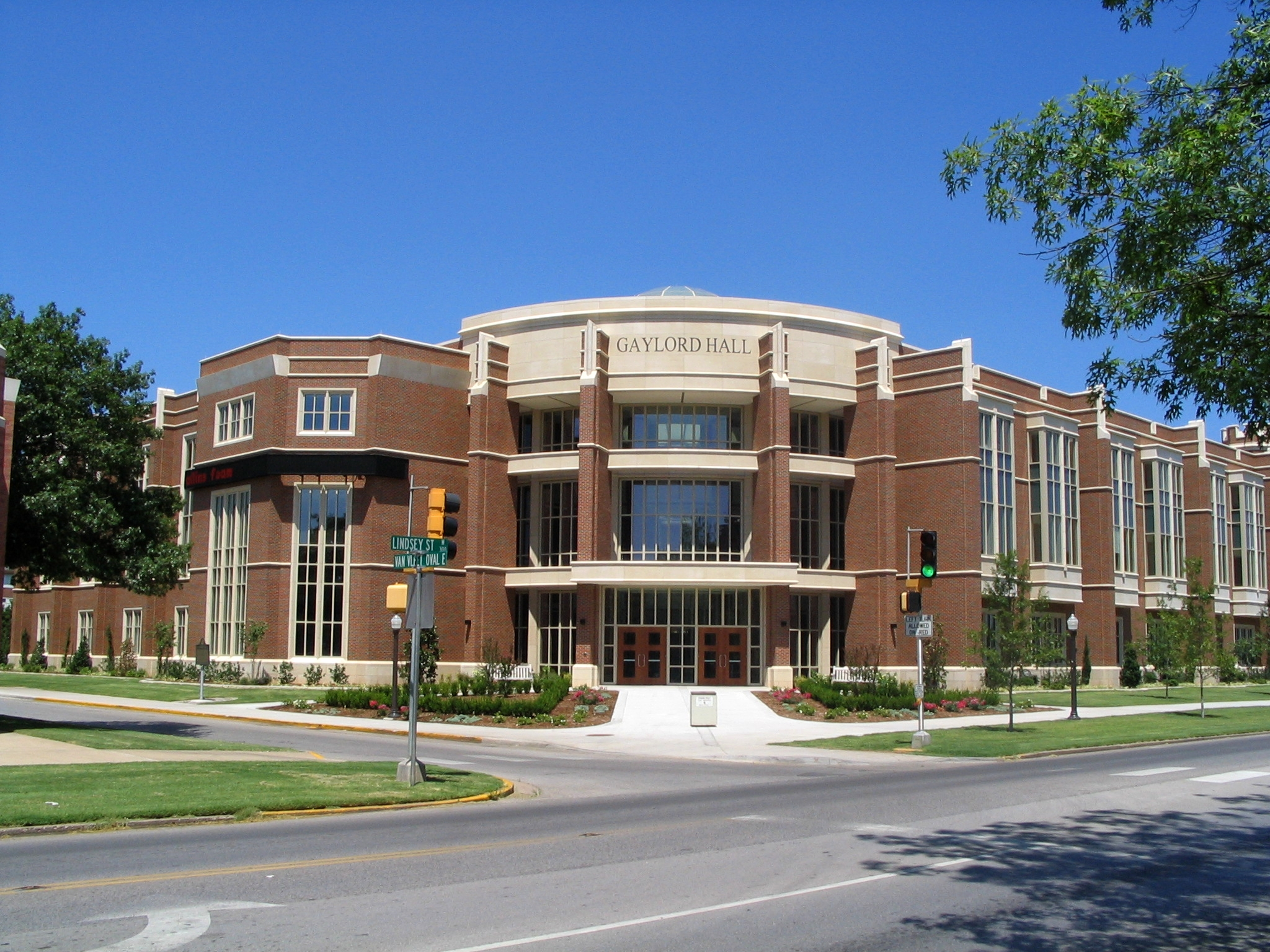
Gaylord Hall, home of the Gaylord College of Journalism and Mass Communication, finished construction in 2004.

In addition to 174 majors to choose from, the University of Oklahoma also has an Honors College featuring its own dedicated faculty, dormitories, and writing center. Every student from any major can apply to the college; if accepted, the student is eligible to take honors classes and graduate cum laude. In order to graduate with honors, the student must complete 18 credit hours of honors classes and submit an honors thesis. Transfer students are able to transfer up to nine credit hours of honor classes from a different university.

In addition to being a member of the Southeastern Universities Research Association and Universities Research Association, undergraduate admission to the University of Oklahoma is categorized by the Carnegie Classification of Institutions of Higher Education as "more selective". For the 2010–2011 school year, 9,996 applied and 8,498 were admitted (85%). The university's freshman retention rate in 2009 was 82% and the six-year graduation rate was 62.0%.

In May 2019, U.S. News & World Report said that the University of Oklahoma gave "inflated" data on its alumni giving rates for two decades and in response, would show the university as unranked in its 2019 edition of "Best Colleges" rankings.

For the 2024–2025 academic year, the middle 50% of enrolled students scored between 1090 and 1380 on the SAT (with a 50th percentile of 1220), between 550 and 690 on the SAT Evidence-Based Reading and Writing section (50th percentile: 610), and between 540 and 690 on the SAT Math section (50th percentile: 610).

=== Drama School ===
The School of Drama was founded in 1931 and expanded significantly by 1946, when over 150 students took courses there. By 1948, dramatic performances were given in the North Campus auditorium, a Studio Theater and a Little Theater on the North Campus. Main productions were produced in Holmberg Hall on the Main Campus. 150 students were enrolled in theater and radio education. Rupel J. Jones was chairman of the School of Drama. A theater on campus was originally named after Jones, but in 2015 was named after Elsie C. Brackett. The drama library was based on the lifetime collection of play clippings by Winnie Rice Bixler, the wife of a Norman newspaper editor.

== Museums and libraries ==
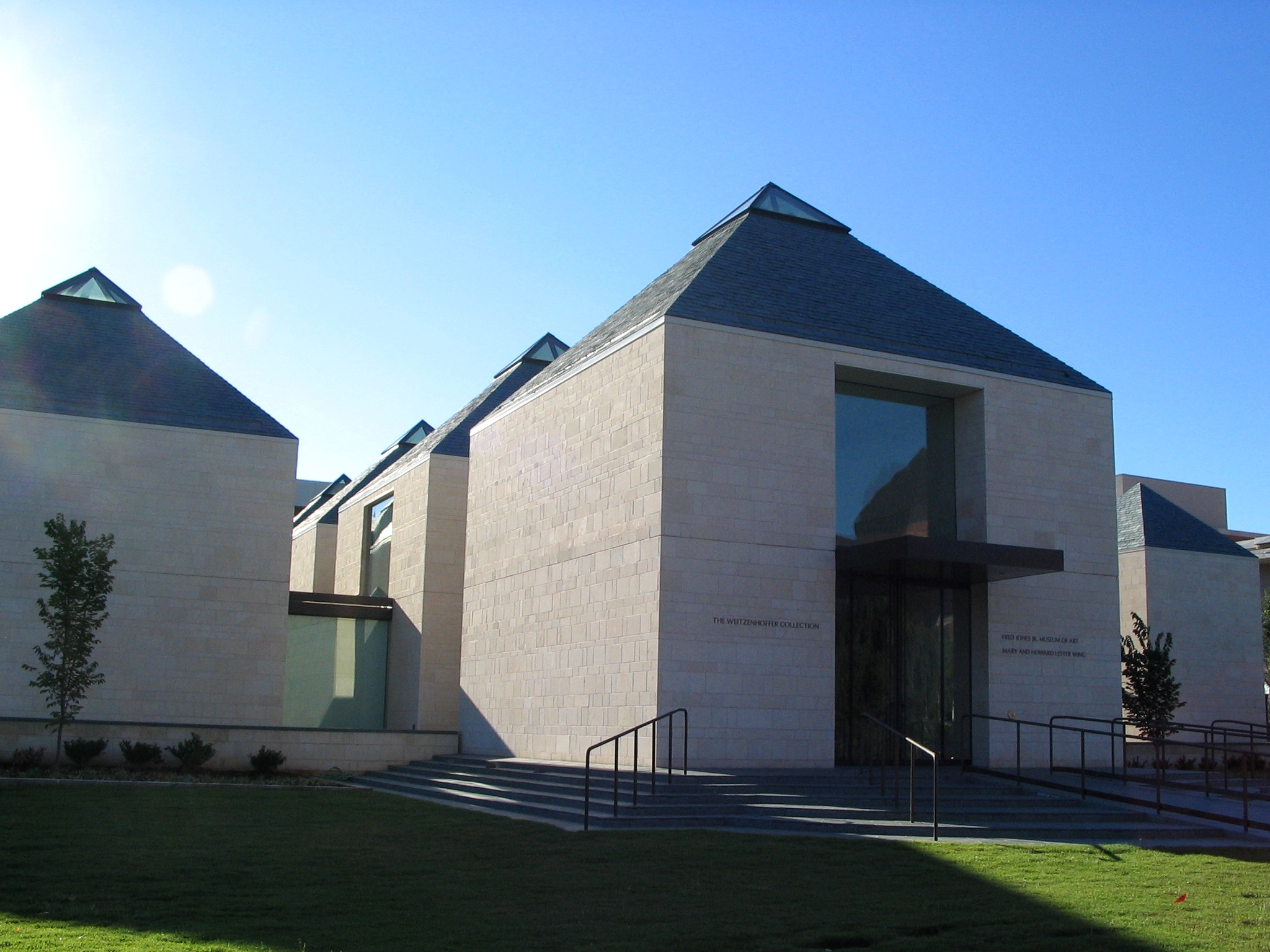
Fred Jones Jr. Museum of Art on the University of Oklahoma campus has a different architectural style than the rest of the campus.

The university has two prominent museums, the Fred Jones Jr. Museum of Art and the Sam Noble Oklahoma Museum of Natural History.

- The Museum of Art was founded in 1936 and originally headed by Oscar Jacobson, the director of the School of Art at the time. The museum opened with over 2,500 items on display and was originally on campus in Jacobson Hall. Mr. and Mrs. Fred Jones of Oklahoma City donated money for a permanent building in 1971 and the building was named in honor of their son who died in a plane crash during his senior year at the University of Oklahoma. The museum has acquired many renowned works of Native American art and, in 2000, received the Weitzenhoffer Collection of French Impressionism which includes works by Degas, Gauguin, Monet, Pissarro, Renoir, Toulouse-Lautrec, Van Gogh, and Vuillard. As of 2011 the museum has over 65,000 square feet (6,000 m^{2}) filled with over 8,000 items from a wide array of time periods and movements. In 2005, the museum expanded with the opening of the new Lester Wing designed by contemporary architect Hugh Newell Jacobsen. The architectural style of the new addition deviates from the Collegiate Gothic style of the university, but Jacobsen felt this was necessary given the contemporary works of art the wing would house.
- The Sam Noble Oklahoma Museum of Natural History, south of the main campus and directly southwest of the law building, specializes in the history of the people and animals that have inhabited Oklahoma over the last 300 million years. Since its founding in 1899, the museum has acquired over 5 million objects. In 2000, a new building was opened to house the ever-expanding museum. The new building offered nearly 200,000 square feet (18,600 m^{2}) of space to display the many exhibits the museum has to offer.

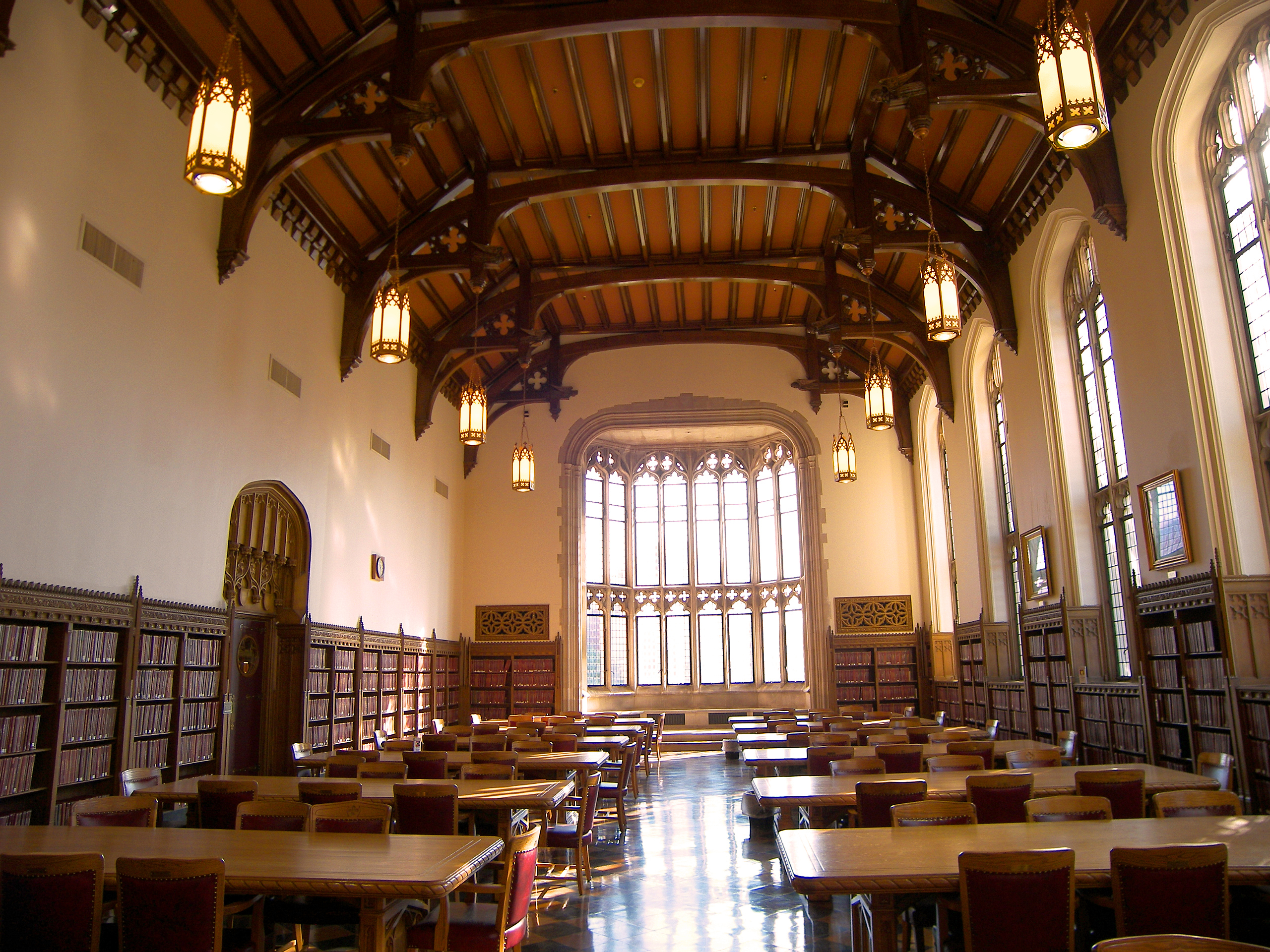
Great Reading Room inside Bizzell Memorial Library

The University of Oklahoma Library system has its headquarters in Bizzell Memorial Library. It is the largest research library in Oklahoma and contains over 4.7 million volumes. It contains more than 1.6 million photographs, subscriptions to over 31,000 periodicals, over 1.5 million maps, government documents dating back to 1893, and over 50 incunabula. It has five locations on campus. The primary library is Bizzell Memorial Library, in the middle of the main campus. The OU library system contains many unique collections such as the History of Science Collections (which houses over 94,000 volumes related to the history of science, including hand-noted works by Galileo Galilei), the Bizzell Bible Collection, and the Western History Collection.

The School of Library and Information Studies (SLIS), the only American Library Association-accredited program in Oklahoma, offers a graduate degree (Master of Library and Information Studies) and an undergraduate degree (Bachelor of Arts in Information Studies). The impact of OU and SLIS on the history of libraries in Oklahoma is shown in the recent list of 100 Oklahoma Library Legends as produced by the Oklahoma Library Association. Two current faculty, one faculty emeriti, and numerous others associated with either the OU libraries or SLIS account for nearly 10% of the list's members.

== Residential life ==
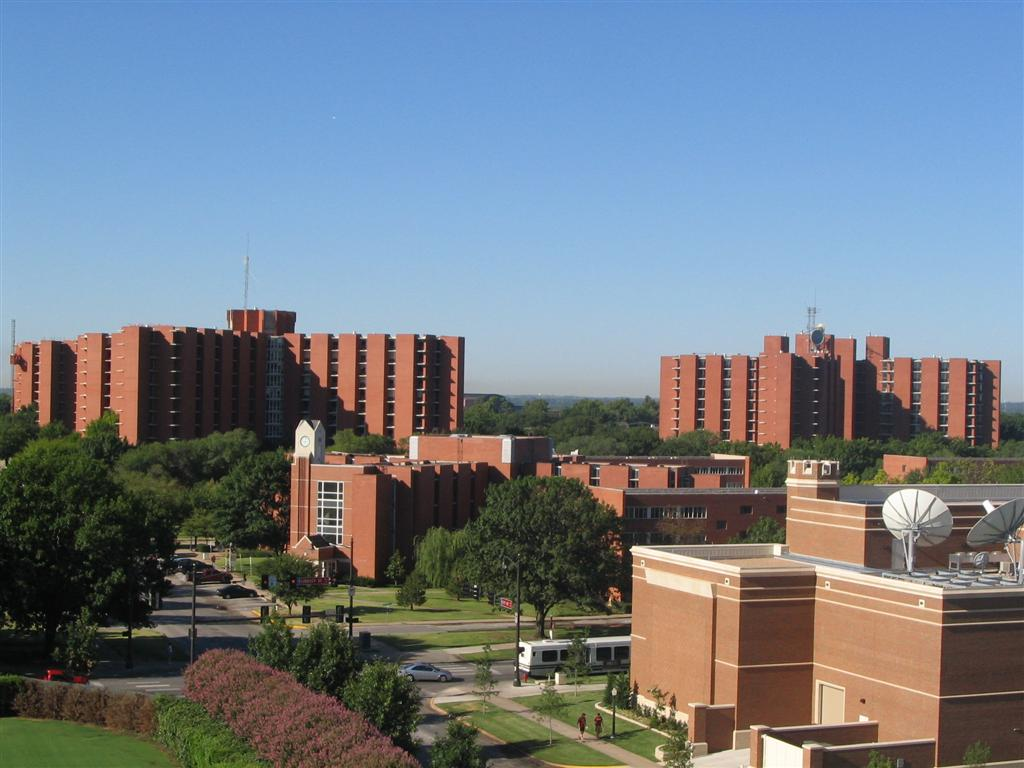
2005 view of the Walker, Couch, Adams, and DLB dorm buildings, which made up four of the school's residential halls.

Oklahoma requires, with few exceptions, that all freshmen live in one of the six residence halls: the Towers, which are two (formerly three) 12-story buildings on the south side of campus.

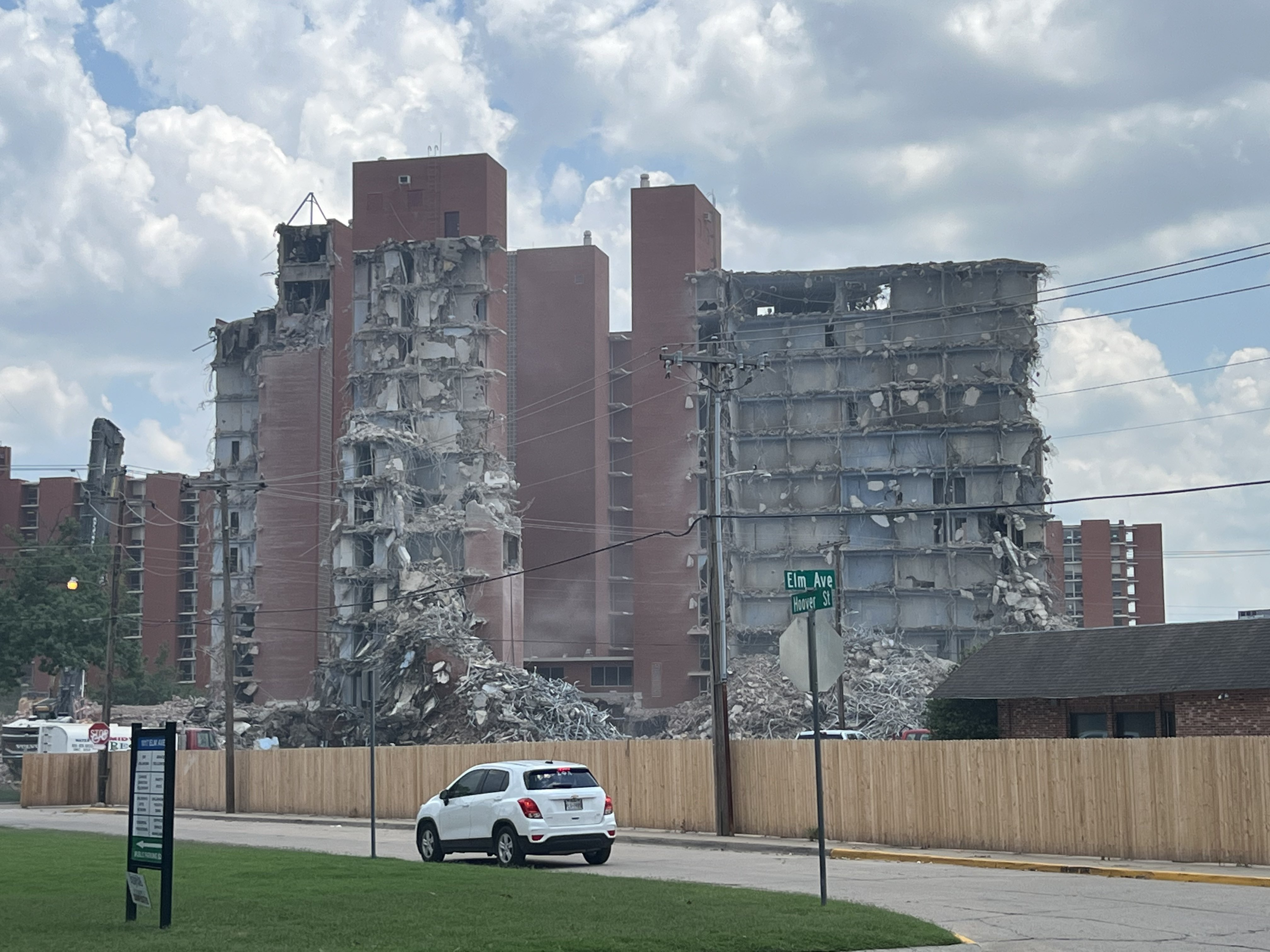
Adams Tower partially demolished in early Summer 2023. It had been standing since 1964.

Due to a low cost of living in Oklahoma, many students find it financially viable to live off campus in apartments or houses. In recent years, many new apartment or condominium complexes (not including the OU-owned properties) have been built.

== Student organizations, activities, and media ==
Undergraduate demographics as of Fall 2023
| Race and ethnicity | Total |
|---|---|
| White | 57% |
| Hispanic | 14% |
| Two or more races | 10% |
| Asian | 7% |
| Black | 5% |
| American Indian/Alaska Native | 3% |
| International student | 3% |
| Unknown | 1% |
Economic diversity
| Low-income (Note: The percentage of students who received an income-based federal Pell grant intended for low-income students.) | 24% |
| Affluent (Note: The percentage of students who are a part of the American middle class at the bare minimum.) | 76% |

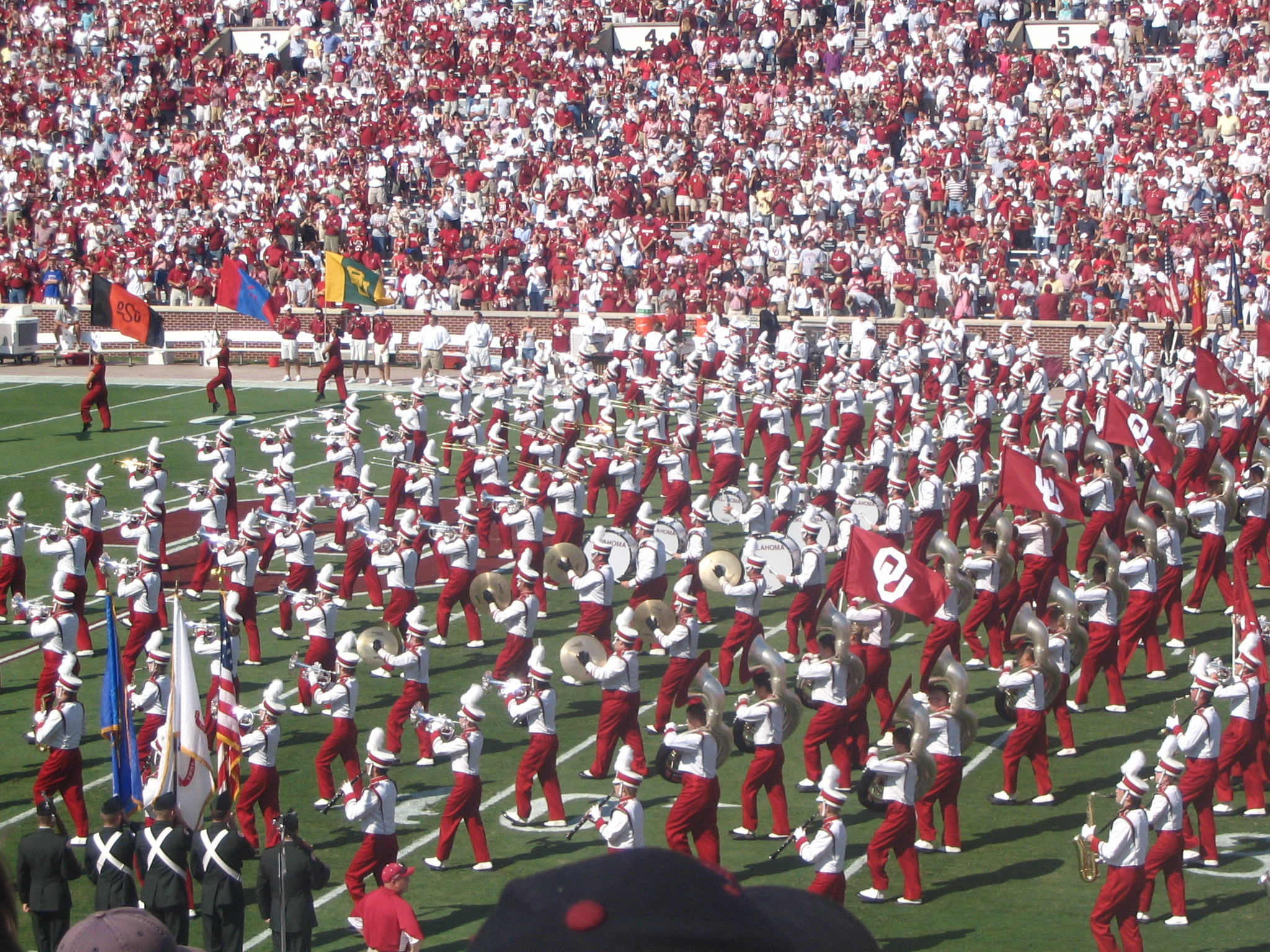
The Pride of Oklahoma Marching Band performs during pre-game and halftimes at football games.

The Pride of Oklahoma, the university's marching band, celebrated its 100th anniversary in 2004 and consists of 311 student musicians and dancers from 19 states. Students wishing to enter the band go through a rigorous audition process. The band plays at every home football game. A smaller pep band, which usually consists of 100 members, travels to every away football game. The full band makes trips to the AT&T Red River Rivalry game against The University of Texas, Big 12 Championship Game, bowl games and other games of importance. Members of the band are also present for many student events. It was awarded the Sudler Trophy in 1987. In 2007, The Pride of Oklahoma marched in the Macy's Thanksgiving Day Parade, making it one of only a few bands to have ever marched in both the Tournament of Roses and Macy's Parades.

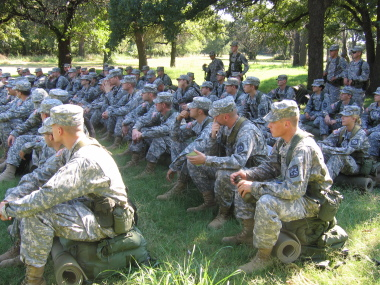
The University of Oklahoma Army ROTC, 2007 field training

The local chapter of the Army ROTC provides officer training and education for nearly 100 OU students. Officially founded in 1919, it is one of the oldest such programs in the nation. OU Army ROTC cadets are active in numerous campus and state activities. They provide military color guards for Sooner football games and various on-campus ceremonies and events. After completing the Army ROTC program, OU students receive a commission in either the Regular Army, Army Reserve, or National Guard.

The campus student radio station, Studio U, broadcasts over the Internet. The campus TV station, OUTV, features student-produced programming five nights a week and is available on Public-access television cable TV (Cox Communications Ch. 124, ATT uVerse 99) also via Facebook and YouTube sites. OU Nightly, the live student newscast, airs weekdays at 7:00am, 12:00pm, 4:30pm live and 9:30pm. Sooner Sportspad, a live sports program, airs live Monday nights at 7:30 on Fox Sports SW and throughout the week as repeats on OUTV. Oklahoma's Gaylord College of Journalism and Mass Communication programs Studio U and OUTV. Oklahoma's Department of Continuing Education operates KROU and KGOU, a public radio station broadcasting on 106.3 FM. KGOU is affiliated with NPR.

The University of Oklahoma maintains a delegation to the Oklahoma Intercollegiate Legislature. With the delegation being one of the oldest delegations to the mock legislature.

The campus newspaper, The Oklahoma Daily, is produced daily during the fall and spring semesters and weekly during the summer semester. The Oklahoma Daily's sister publication, Sooner yearbook, creates a 400-page coffee table book for current students and alumni. Sooner, ranked as one of the top two yearbooks nationwide, focuses on capturing the year with storytelling packages of text, photos and design.

== Athletics ==
Sports at Oklahoma
| Men's | Women's |
|---|---|
| Baseball; Basketball; Cross country; Football; Golf; Gymnastics; Tennis; Track & field; Wrestling | Basketball; Cross country; Golf; Gymnastics; Rowing; Soccer; Softball; Tennis; Track & field; Volleyball |

The school's sports teams are called the Sooners, a nickname given to early settlers during the land run who sneaked into the offered territory and staked claims illegally before they were officially allowed to. They participate in the NCAA's Division I-Bowl Subdivision and in the Southeastern Conference (SEC). The school sponsors nine sports for both men and women. The university has claimed 43 team national championships, which includes 17 football national championships (football championships are not awarded by the NCAA). By far, OU's most famous and storied athletic program is the football program, which has produced seven Heisman Trophy winners: Billy Vessels in 1952, Steve Owens in 1969, Billy Sims in 1978, Jason White in 2003, Sam Bradford in 2008, Baker Mayfield in 2017, and Kyler Murray in 2018. Many Pro Football Hall of Famers, including Lee Roy Selmon and Troy Aikman, also attended the University of Oklahoma. In 1988, OU became the first school to participate in both the football and basketball national championships in the same year, an achievement unequaled until the 2006 season, when Ohio State and the University of Florida were both in each, with Florida winning both games. Oklahoma also currently holds the record for the longest winning streak in NCAA Division I history when they won 47 consecutive games between 1953 and 1957. In reference to the team's success and popularity as a symbol of state pride, George Lynn Cross, OU's president from 1943 to 1968, once told the Oklahoma State Senate, "I want a university the football team can be proud of."

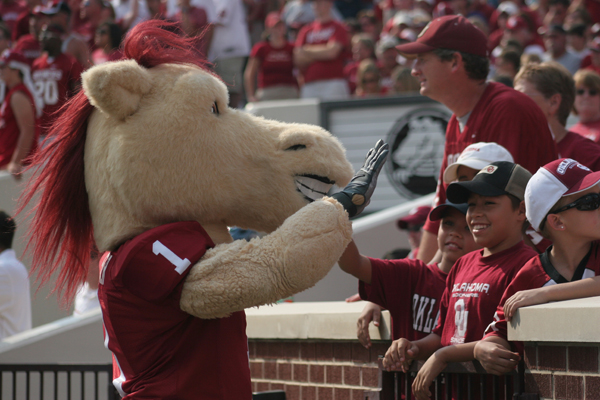
University of Oklahoma mascot

The wrestling program is the fourth most decorated in college wrestling, having won seven national championships. (Note: In 1936, 1951, 1952, 1957, 1960, 1963 and 1974.) The men's gymnastics team has won twelve national championships, the most out of all sports at the University of Oklahoma. (Note: In 1977, 1978, 1991, 2002, 2003, 2005, 2006, 2008, 2015, 2016, 2017, and 2018.) In addition, Oklahoma has produced five Nissen Emery Award winners, more than any other school and the only school with back-to-back honorees. The women's gymnastics team was crowned co-national champions with the University of Florida in 2014 and won back-to-back national championships in 2016 and 2017 also in 2025 and 2026. The softball team has won eight national championships, the first in 2000 another in 2013, back to back titles in 2016 and 2017, and four consecutive titles in 2021, 2022, 2023, and 2024. The baseball team has won national championships in 1951, 1994, and 2026. On May 10, 2007, the university announced the addition of women's rowing to the intercollegiate athletics program. A rowing facility will be built on the Oklahoma River near downtown Oklahoma City. This is the first sport added since women's soccer was added in 1996.

The University of Oklahoma has had a long and bitter rivalry with the University of Texas known as the Red River Shootout, Red River Rivalry, or OU–Texas, with Texas having the better overall football record at 65–52–5. This rivalry is often thought of as a contest of state pride along with school pride. OU also has a long-standing rivalry with Oklahoma State University. Known as the Bedlam Series, it encompasses all the athletic contests between the two universities with the winner receiving the Bedlam Bell. Another major historic rival is the University of Nebraska, which was part of the Big 8 Conference with Oklahoma and later joined with Oklahoma and other schools in the formation of the Big 12 Conference. The Sooners made football history on December 6, 2008, when they scored sixty or more points in five consecutive games. This achievement occurred during their victory over the University of Missouri for the Big 12 Championship.

On June 30, 2021, the University of Oklahoma Board of Regents unanimously accepted an invitation to join the Southeastern Conference (SEC) along with the University of Texas beginning on July 1, 2024.

== See also ==
- 2005 University of Oklahoma bombing
- Boomer Sooner
- University of Oklahoma during the second presidency of Donald Trump
- Neustadt International Prize for Literature
- Red telephone box
- RUF/NEKS
- 2025 University of Oklahoma essay controversy
