= University of Oklahoma Army ROTC =

The University of Oklahoma Army ROTC (Reserve Officer Training Corps) is the primary officer training and commissioning program at the University of Oklahoma and one of the oldest in the nation, having existed in some form since the First World War. It is known as the "Sooner Battalion" and is notable for having produced thousands of officers for the United States Army, including 19 general officers. It is led by three officers and two noncommissioned officers.

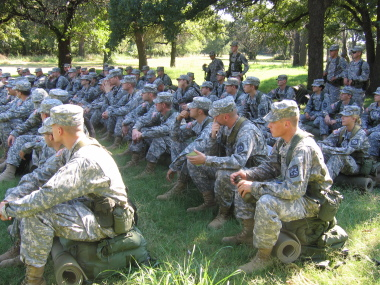
The University of Oklahoma Army ROTC assembled in formation at its Fall 2007 Field Training Exercise.

== History ==
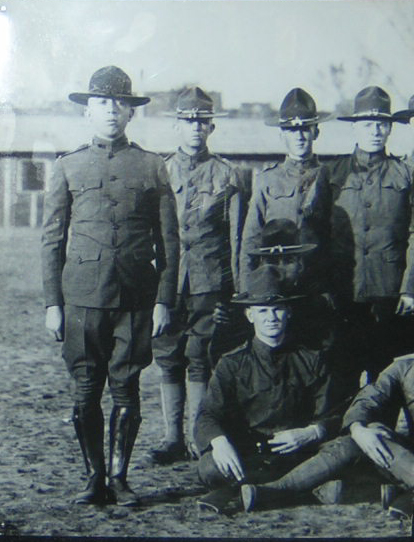
Cadets of the Student Army Training Corps, the OU Army ROTC predecessor unit, standing at attention.

The OU Army ROTC has its roots in the Student Volunteer Regiment, which was formed in 1917 as a result of the entry of the United States into the First World War. Then-University President Stratton D. Brooks approved the creation of an amateur military unit at the behest of the study body, which demanded instruction in basic military skills and tactics. The Regiment, however, lacked instructors, equipment, and formal support from the Army. Lasting only one semester, the Student Volunteer Regiment was soon supplanted by the Student Military Regiment, which was led by two retired Army officers who themselves hand-carved wooden military drill rifles.

The War Department finally granted formal support for military training at the University of Oklahoma in the fall 1918 with the creation of the Student Army Training Corps - a program designed to train students for immediate wartime service. With the abrupt end of the War, however, the program was short-lived, and it was soon replaced by the Reserve Officer Training Corps, which sought to train college-educated men for commissioned Army service.

Since then, the OU Army ROTC has continually produced Army officers - save a brief interruption during the Second World War, which was a war in which 503 OU Army ROTC alumni were killed. OU Army ROTC alumni have served in every major American war. Today, most recent graduates have served in the wars in Iraq and Afghanistan.

== Program organization ==
The OU Army ROTC unit mimics the chain of command and military organization of a real Army unit. The highest-ranking officer and current professor of military science of the OU ROTC program is LTC Ryan Cryer. Basic course cadets in their first and second years serve in roles equivalent to those filled by junior enlisted soldiers. They learn basic skills such as orienteering, marksmanship, survival skills, physical fitness, and basic leadership principles.

Cadets in their third year serve in roles equivalent to those held by noncommissioned officers and junior officers. They are responsible for mentoring younger cadets, ensuring that necessary unit functions are completed to standard, and providing basic leadership. Their training mostly focuses on preparation for Warrior Forge, their summer field training exercise. Held at Fort Knox, Kentucky, it is a 33-day field problem that challenges cadets physically and mentally while assessing their leadership skills in a variety of tasks and small unit tactical exercises. Third year students learn squad tactics and continue to develop themselves personally and professionally.

Fourth year cadets serve in roles equivalent to those held by senior company grade and field grade officers. They are responsible for literally running the unit and planning training, taking only a minimum amount of guidance from training cadre and superior officers. They teach the first through third year cadets the skills that they need to be successful and continue to develop them as leaders and soldiers. A lieutenant colonel personally instructs the senior cadets, refining their leadership skills and teaching them the nuances of Army officership before their commissioning as second lieutenants.

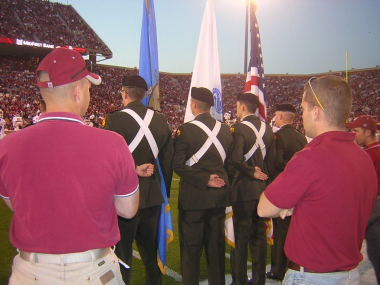
An OU Army ROTC color guard stands at parade rest moments before advancing onto the football field at an OU Sooners football game.

== Training opportunities and activities ==
Cadets attend PT, class and lab as a part of the ROTC program at OU. Fitness training follows a 5-day a week program known as the Physical Readiness Training (PRT) program. Cadets are evaluated on their physical aptitude several times a semester with the Army Physical Fitness Test. Classes are separated by grade (MS-I to MS-IV) and each class learns grade-specific curriculum to prepare cadets for being US Army officers. Lab is conducted once a week to practice concepts learned in class, such as land navigation and squad tactics.

Cadets in the OU Army ROTC program are extremely active on campus, in the state, and across the nation. Along with the Pride of Oklahoma, the OU Army ROTC assists with the Oklahoma Sooners football pre-game show by providing a military color guard to open the event. Cadets may also volunteer to participate in flag detail at military appreciation sporting events.

Each year, OU Army ROTC sends cadets to participate in the Bataan Memorial Death March, which is a marathon held annually at White Sands, New Mexico in honor of the survivors and victims of the actual Bataan Death March. OU cadets also participate in other events, including the Oklahoma City Marathon and competitive shooting events.

Cadets are also allowed to attend special Army training schools, such as Airborne School, Air Assault School, Mountain Warfare School, Northern Warfare School, and SCUBA School.

== Cadet status ==
Many contracted cadets are actual uniformed members of the Army Reserve or Oklahoma National Guard. As such, they are entitled to financial remuneration which may include the complete payment of all costs associated with higher education and a modest tax-free salary.

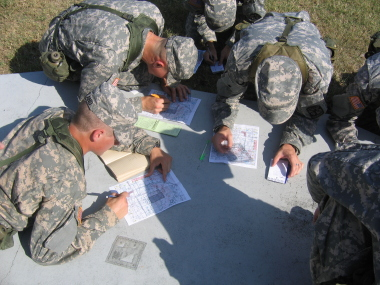
Cadets preparing their maps for an orienteering course on a field training exercise (FTX).

Many cadets are also former soldiers, having served in the enlisted grades either in the Reserve Component or Regular Army. There are also several former sailors and marines pursuing an Army commission.

While enrolled as a cadet, soldiers who also serve with a reserve component unit may not be deployed. Cadets live as typical college students while at the same time engaging in physical training (PT), military instruction, and officer education. They are not subject to many of the same regulations that govern other soldiers. For example, they are not legally obligated to report their whereabouts to the chain of command when not on duty, and, aside from several mandatory events, may live their lives as they see fit, provided their activities are in accordance with propriety as well as military law and custom, to which cadets must still adhere.

== Location ==
The unit is headquartered in the Armory, which is a small brick building located at the center of the University of Oklahoma's Norman campus. It contains offices, classrooms, a supply room, a drill floor, and a cadet lounge.

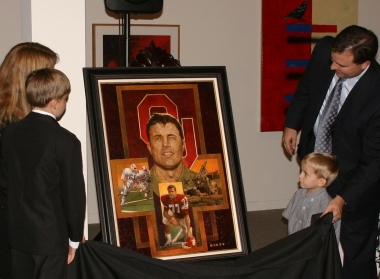
Bob Kalsu's surviving family members unveil his portrait at the annual OU Army ROTC Alumni Banquet.

== Notable alumni ==
- Jack Ridley, USAF test pilot and project engineer for the Bell X-1 program.
- Bob Kalsu, professional football player killed during the Vietnam War.
- Major General Geoffrey Lambert, former commander of the US Special Forces.
- John Lucian Smith, Medal of Honor recipient.
