= University of Oklahoma College of Medicine =

Medical school in Oklahoma City, Oklahoma, US

Coordinates: 35°28′42″N 97°29′56″W

OU College of Medicine
- Type: Public
- Established: 1900
- Endowment: $450 million
- Dean: Ian Dunn
- Faculty: 1344 (988 full-time)
- Postgraduates: 898
- Location: Oklahoma City, Oklahoma, U.S.
- Campus: Urban
- Website: medicine.ouhsc.edu

The University of Oklahoma College of Medicine is the medical school of the University of Oklahoma, located in Oklahoma City. It is part of the university's Health Sciences Center. It is one of 150 medical schools in the United States that are fully accredited by the Liaison Committee on Medical Education, and the only one located in the state of Oklahoma.

== History ==
The University of Oklahoma College of Medicine was founded in 1900 as a medical department of the University of Oklahoma at its main campus in Norman. Lawrence N. Upjohn, M.D. is regarded as the "founding dean", and served from 1900 to 1904. In 1910, the school merged with the Epworth College of Medicine in Oklahoma City. By 1928, all basic science and clinical facilities had been consolidated as what would become the University of Oklahoma Health Sciences Center in Oklahoma City, where there was a growing urban population and larger hospital facilities could be supported. By the 1960s, the college and its affiliated hospitals had grown into a large, traditional academic medical center. In 1974, a geographically separate, community-based clinical campus was established in Tulsa, approximately 100 miles northeast of the main campus. Referred to as the OU College of Medicine, it is the only medical school in Oklahoma that grants the Doctor of Medicine (M.D.) degree.

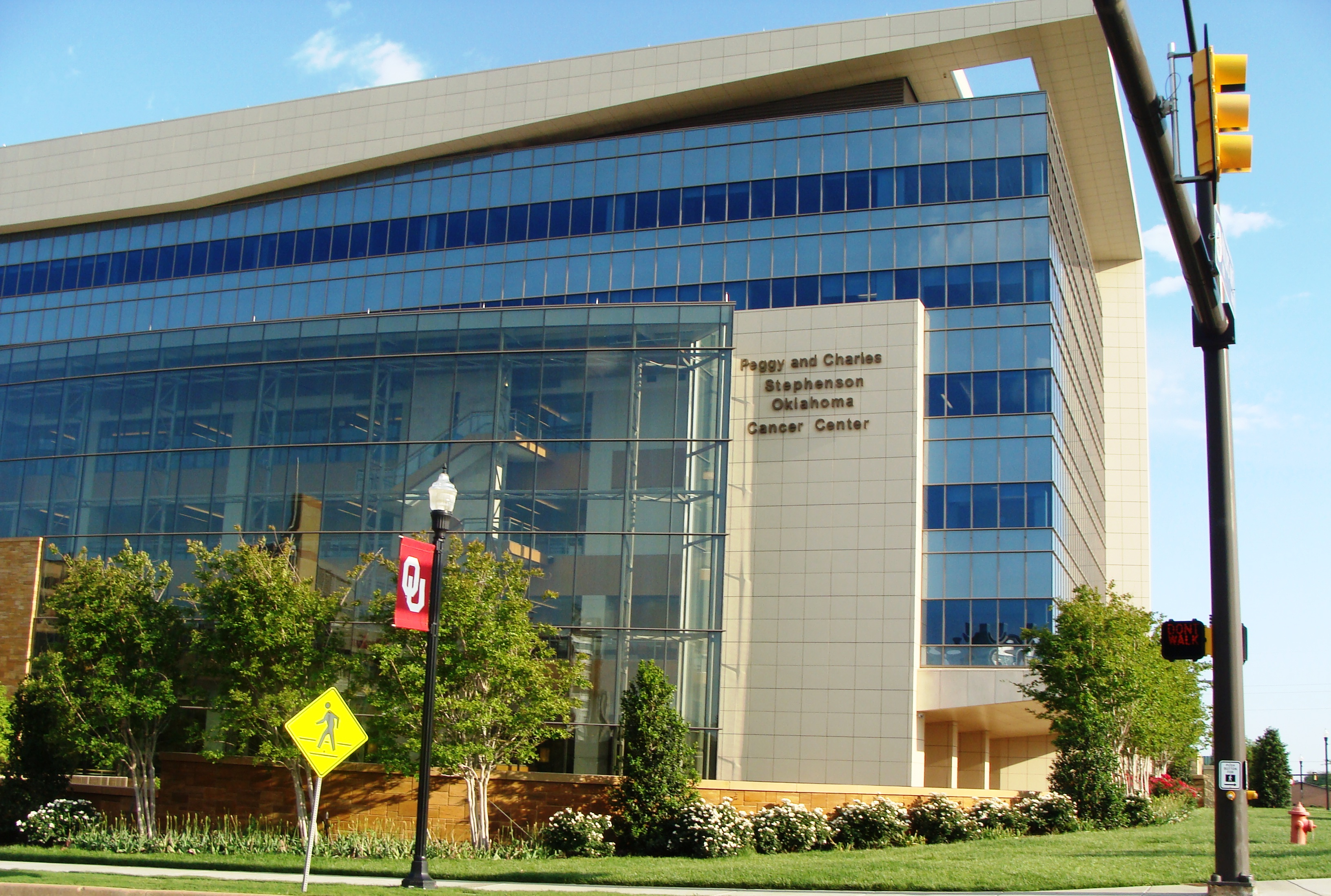
Stephenson Cancer at OU Health Sciences Center

The College of Medicine has approximately 650 students enrolled in the M.D. degree program. The entering first-year class size increased from 150 to 165 in 2006. A few medical students enroll in a combined M.D./Ph.D. degree program. Previously, all medical students spent their first two years at the Oklahoma City campus, and at the end of the second year, up to a quarter of each class elected to complete their third and fourth years clinical experiences at the Tulsa community-based campus. Beginning in 2015, the School of Community Medicine in Tulsa expanded to a full four-year campus, and students could apply to either or both the Oklahoma City main campus medical school, and the School of Community Medicine branch campus in Tulsa. The first class having spent all four years of medical training at the Tulsa School of Community Medicine graduated in 2019.

In addition to medical students, the college has more than 140 graduate students working on doctoral degrees in the biomedical sciences and 170 students enrolled in its physician assistant program.

== Admissions ==
Applications are processed through AMCAS and must be submitted by October 15. The minimum scores to apply are a 3.0 GPA and a 21 on the MCAT, but the average scores of students accepted are much higher and fluctuate from year to year.

== Academics ==
OU College of Medicine has 17 clinical departments and four basic science departments at the Oklahoma City campus.

== Facilities ==
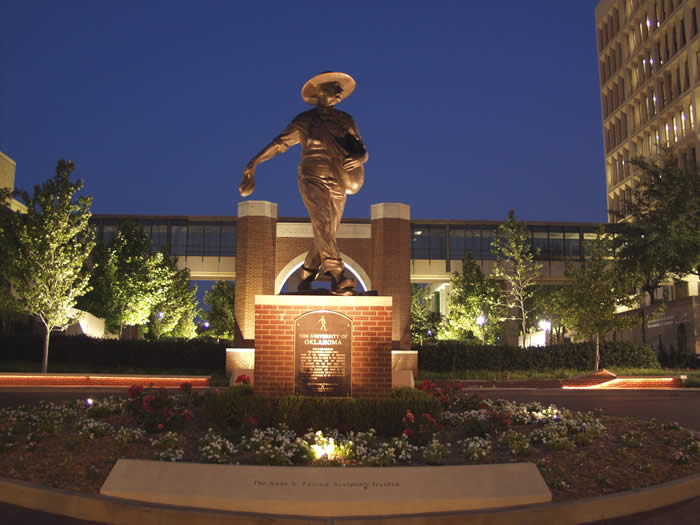
Seed Sower at OU Health Sciences Center

The college sponsors residency and fellowship training in 74 specialities and subspecialties of medicine, and has approximately 755 residents/fellows in training. The major teaching hospitals affiliated with the college in Oklahoma City are the OU Medical Center, the Children's Hospital, and the VA Medical Center. The faculty practice, known as OU Physicians, includes virtually every medical and surgical specialty and subspecialty. In 2008, the new umbrella brand "OU Medicine" was released to reflect the entire enterprise that encompasses the OU College of Medicine, OU Medical Center, the Children's Hospital, OU Physicians, and the University Hospitals Authority & Trust.

At the Tulsa campus, known as the Schusterman Center, programs are affiliated with three hospitals: Hillcrest Medical Center, Saint Francis Hospital, and St. John Medical Center. In 2008, the university announced that the Tulsa campus of the College of Medicine would become the OU School of Community Medicine within the College of Medicine. A separate educational track was developed and implemented with a special focus on community medicine. On December 1, 2009, OU and the University of Tulsa announced that the two universities would collaborate to create a four-year medical school in Tulsa. In 2019, the OU Tulsa School of Community Medicine graduated its first class of 30 students who had spent the entire four years of medical training at the Tulsa branch campus.

== See also ==
- Medical facilities in Tulsa
