= 2025 University of Oklahoma essay controversy =

Incident about a college essay in the US

In November 2025, a controversy arose surrounding a failing grade given to an essay by University of Oklahoma (OU) psychology student Samantha Fulnecky, which she characterized as an example of religious discrimination. The essay was graded independently by two instructors, both graduate teaching assistants, who argued that Fulnecky had not done what was assigned.

Fulnecky was enrolled in a psychology class in which students were instructed to read and discuss a research study which correlated gender typicality and the social lives and mental health of middle school boys and girls. Fulnecky's essay argued that there were only two genders and that gender roles were created by God, referring to the Bible. She wrote that while she did not want kids to be bullied, in the context of gender norm enforcement, it was morally justified. She also used biblical authority to call social acceptance of transgender people "demonic". The essay was unrelated to the study; transgender and nonbinary identities were not presented in the research.

The first instructor, who is transgender, graded Fulnecky's essay 0 out of 25, because the essay had not answered the assignment, contradicted itself, and failed to cite any empirical evidence. Another instructor, who is cisgender, was asked to grade the paper again and also gave it a failing grade, arguing Fulnecky had not completed the assignment. Fulnecky subsequently filed a claim of religious discrimination. The first instructor was placed on administrative leave and relieved of instructional duties after an investigation, which she later appealed. The second instructor was removed from the class. OU determined the assignment would not count toward Fulnecky's final grade as it had been graded "arbitrarily".

The incident was amplified by Turning Point USA (TPUSA) which escalated into a national culture war by the media and Republican politicians. Oklahoma state representative Gabe Woolley introduced a bill that would allow lawmakers in the state to freeze funding to universities while they audit issues of "ideological bias".

== Incident ==
In November 2025, Samantha Fulnecky was a junior at the University of Oklahoma (OU) majoring in psychology. She was listed as an Intercollegiate Tennis Association (ITA) scholar athlete and on the Southeastern Conference academic honor roll. She redshirted for OU's tennis team her freshman year, but never competed. She is from Nixa, Missouri, and her mother is a lawyer who represented January 6 insurrectionists.

Fulnecky was enrolled in a course called "Lifespan Development" in which her class was assigned to read a research study and write a reflective essay in response to the reading. The course instructors were graduate teaching assistants, one a trans woman who received an award from the OU's psychology department for outstanding teaching. The other instructor was cisgender.

=== Assignment ===
The reading assigned was "Relations Among Gender Typicality, Peer Relations, and Mental Health During Early Adolescence" published in the journal Social Development. The study surveyed middle school children who reported their own gender typicality (contrast to gender atypicality) as well as that of their peers, and rated the social relations of their peers and their own mental health. The study associated characteristics such as being athletic or "tough" with typicality for boys, and physical attractiveness and gossiping for girls. The researchers found that gender typicality was correlated with popularity and likeability in both boys and girls, and that gender atypicality correlated with depressive symptoms. Typicality and likeability were correlated with positive mental health measures in boys, but more anxiety and negative body image for girls.

Students were asked to write "a thoughtful reaction to the material presented" and offered various starting points based on the study's procedure, results, or interpretations. Fulnecky wrote that the premise of the article was that there were more than two genders, which frustrated her. Her submission diverged from empirical analysis, instead framing gender roles through a religious lens. She argued that "Women naturally want to do womanly things because God created us with those womanly desires in our hearts. The same goes for men," and that innate desires, not social norms, influence gender conformity in women, citing unquoted Bible passages without specific citations or context. She wrote that while she did "not want kids to be teased or bullied in school," she did not find it as a method of enforcing of gender norms to be problematic and argued it was Biblical. Fulnecky accused her classmates of being "cowardly and insincere" for their acceptance of progressive views on gender, and said that society was "demonic" for supporting transgender people. Fulnecky did not analyze the content of the study and she instead selected an unrelated ideological topic to discuss; topics of transgender and nonbinary identities were not present and she attributed to the authors views that were not expressed. The study also noted that girls who studied physics or played sports were correlated with gender atypicality, which Baptist News Global pointed out in context with Fulnecky's position on OU's tennis team.

=== Grade and dispute ===
Essays were graded on a 25-point scale based on clarity and coherence (5 points), connection to the assigned article (10 points), and presentation of a thoughtful reaction rather than a summary (10 points). A minimum word count of 650 was required, with a 10-point deduction for submissions between 620 and 649 words.

Fulnecky was given a failing grade of 0. The first grader said that Fulnecky's essay did not answer the assignment. In the comments, the grader wrote that the failing grade was not based on Fulnecky's personal beliefs, but rather the paper contradicted itself, used "personal ideology over empirical evidence in a scientific class," and was "at times offensive." She also wrote to Fulnecky that academic and health-related associations in the US agree that "sex and gender is neither binary nor fixed." A second instructor, who is cisgender, re-assessed the paper and agreed with the initial grade, commenting that the paper "should not be considered as a completion of the assignment."

Fulnecky filed a complaint of discrimination based on religious beliefs. The first instructor was placed on administrative leave and the second instructor was removed from the class. After the first instructor was suspended, she retained legal counsel. She was then dismissed from instructional duties and filed an appeal. OU determined that the assignment would not be counted towards Fulnecky's final grade because the grade given was "arbitrary".

== Reaction ==
=== Turning Point USA ===
When Fulnecky reached out to OU's leadership to contest her grade, she also reached out to Turning Point USA (TPUSA), a right-wing nonprofit organization. Both the essay and the comments were posted online by the university TPUSA chapter, who stated that "We at Turning Point OU stand with Samantha. We should not be letting mentally ill professors around students," gaining 40 million views in less than a week. Following TPUSA's post, the incident quickly went viral and received national attention.

TPUSA maintains a "Professor Watchlist" tool that encourages students to report educators who have far-left politics. Anti-transgender conservatives have for years campaigned to ban transgender people from working as teachers and to ban the teaching of LGBTQ-friendly material more broadly. The second Trump administration has conducted a wider campaign against transgender people, with dozens of professors across the country being fired or disciplined, and schools and universities being told they would lose federal funding if they did not adopt anti-trans policies.

=== Academia ===
The graduate student senate at OU passed a bill which called for "increased transparency" around the administrative leave policy and additional protections for graduate teaching assistants who are investigated, and expressed concern regarding harassment and online comments made towards the instructor. A rally on campus calling for the instructor's reinstatement was attended by hundreds, including students, faculty, and alumni. The university removed another instructor who had excused their students to attend the protests, as it had determined that the instructor had not extended that opportunity to students wishing to demonstrate in support of an opposing view.

The American Association of University Professors wrote a petition to OU which demanded a response as to the school's handling of academic freedom and transparency into university's response the incident, including the adverse actions taken against the instructors. The petition garnered more than 24,000 signatures. The Freedom from Religion Foundation called for the instructor's reinstatement with the position that Fulnecky had not done the assignment correctly. The chairman of the state's Federation of College Republicans called the essay "indefensible".

=== Media and politics ===
The media and Republican politicians elevated the situation into a national culture war. In Oklahoma, governor Kevin Stitt said, "The situation at OU is deeply concerning. I'm calling on the OU regents to review the results of the investigation & ensure other students aren't unfairly penalized for their beliefs." Ryan Walters, the former Superintendent of Public Instruction, referred to Fulnecky as "an American hero", claiming OU professors were Marxist and called for the firing of any staff involved. State senator Shane Jett called for an audit of "ideological bias" and state representative Gabe Woolley later introduced a bill to allow Oklahoma lawmakers to cut funding from state universities. Woolley had previously presented Fulnecky with a "citation of recognition."

The Chronicle of Higher Education asked two professors, based on the information available to them, if Fulnecky's assignment deserved a zero grade. Psychology professor Regan Gurung of Oregon State University said he did not think the response demonstrated a "clear tie-in" to the assigned reading, but that it did not deserve a zero. An economics professor at the University of Virginia School of Law said Fulnecky's writing "is not that bad" and noted "there's a lot of bad writing out there", but declined to say what grade she would have given. Baptist News Global said the incident was part of a "culture war battle". They said Fulnecky reacted to an "imagined version" of the assigned research study rather than its actual content and, without any rationale, contradicted its premises and conclusion.

== See also ==
- Transphobia – Anti-transgender prejudice
  - Transphobia in the United States
  - Persecution of transgender people under the second Trump administration
- Religion and LGBTQ people
- University of Oklahoma in the second Trump administration
- San Jose State transgender volleyball controversy
