= University of Oklahoma College of Liberal Studies =

- Type: Public
- Established: 1961
- Parent institution: University of Oklahoma
- Academic affiliations: Higher Learning Commission
- Dean: Martha Banz
- Faculty: 7
- Students: 1,660
- Location: Norman, Oklahoma, United States; 35.1988°N 97.4449°W
- Website: http://www.ou.edu/cls.html

The University of Oklahoma College of Liberal Studies (CLS) is an accredited, academic division of the University of Oklahoma (OU) in Norman, Oklahoma. As the first interdisciplinary Liberal Studies degree program in the country, the college was established in 1961 to fill the need for non-traditional students to continue their education while balancing external obligations. In 2003, the college began offering OU’s first 100% online degree. As of Fall 2013, the college has an enrollment of 1058 undergraduates and 602 graduate students.

As one of OU's 20 colleges, all CLS undergraduate and graduate degree programs are regionally accredited by the North Central Association of Colleges and Schools, a part of the Higher Learning Commission. In U.S. News & World Report’s 2019 publication, Best Online Bachelor’s Programs, the College of Liberal Studies was ranked eighth nationally and, in the same publication, it was ranked 10th for its Criminal Justice program.

== History ==
Recognizing that the needs in adult education in Oklahoma were not being fulfilled, OU Extension Division Dean Thurman J. White wrote in a July 1953 report to OU President George L. Cross that OU felt a "special responsibility to the state’s non-rural population … the time seems right for a bold move by the university on the extension front."

During the 1957-1958 academic year, several studies were done to address the needs in adult education. In 1957, OU received a grant from the Center for the Study of Liberal Education for Adults to sponsor a faculty seminar. Vice President Pete Kyle McCarter explained the purpose of the seminar was "to discuss and develop a suitable university program of liberal education for adults, including the possibility of some kind of a degree program."

The resulting degree was designed to provide an interdisciplinary education to working adults. Independent study was required in several areas: the humanities, social sciences, and natural sciences. In addition to studying these areas, students also participated in intensive seminars covering each field and extending over a period of several weeks. Faculty members were drawn from other colleges on campus

The first BLS degrees were granted to a graduating class of six in June 1963. By August 1963, 217 students were pursuing their Bachelor of Liberal Studies and, in 1966, 19 graduated and nearly 800 students were enrolled

In April 1970, the Board of Regents renamed the College of Continuing Education to the College of Liberal Studies. The same year, the College of Liberal Studies became an academic unit of OU and was given its own dean and degree-granting status.

In 1967, the Master of Liberal Studies degree plan was approved and offered through the college. The first MLS introductory seminar was held in January 1968, and on Aug. 2, 1970, the first Master of Liberal Studies degrees were conferred with 13 students receiving the degree.

The College of Liberal Studies began changing shape in the 1990s when Dr. Susan Nash, Dean Emeritus Dr. George Henderson, and their teams extended the program to include online courses. Changes to course format also made liberal studies classes more similar to traditional courses at the university. In 2003, the college committed to offer undergraduate and graduate degrees totally online under the direction of current dean, Dr. James P. Pappas. They were the first degrees of this kind at the University of Oklahoma.

== Academic programs ==
The five undergraduate degrees offered by CLS are 120-hour programs that can be completed 100% online. The five graduate degrees are 33-hour degree programs completed 100% online.

Undergraduate degree programs include:

- Bachelor of Arts in Administration Leadership
- Bachelor of Arts in Liberal Studies
- Bachelor of Arts in Lifespan Care Administration
- Bachelor of Arts in World Cultural Studies
- Bachelor of Science in Criminal Justice

Graduate degree programs include:

- Master of Arts in Administrative Leadership
- Master of Arts in Human and Health Services Administration
- Master of Arts in Museum Studies
- Master of Prevention Science
- Master of Science in Criminal Justice

== Administration and faculty ==
- Interim Dean, Martha Banz, Ph.D.

The CLS faculty has seven full-time members who are supported by more than 100 adjunct faculty.

== Publications ==
- Insight Alumni Magazine
- Journal of Museum Studies
