= OU School of Community Medicine =

Coordinates: 36°06′07″N 95°55′28″W

- Motto: Educate and train a new generation of practitioners with the skills and desire to improve the health status of all Oklahomans.
- Type: Public
- Established: 1974
- Dean: James Herman, MD
- Postgraduates: 110
- Location: Tulsa, Oklahoma, USA
- Campus: Suburban
- Website: tulsa.ou.edu

The OU School of Community Medicine (OUSCM), located in Tulsa, Oklahoma, is a branch of the University of Oklahoma College of Medicine. It is the first medical school of its kind in the nation. The OU School of Community Medicine is designed to serve the healthcare needs of entire communities, especially vulnerable and underserved populations. OUSCM is guided by the growing need for more physicians focused on serving vulnerable populations, the growing number of people without access to quality health care, and the relatively poor health status of Oklahomans.

== History ==
The University of Oklahoma College of Medicine was founded in 1900 and is located in Oklahoma City, Oklahoma at the University of Oklahoma Health Sciences Center. In 1974, the OU College of Medicine opened a geographically separate, community-based clinical campus in Tulsa, approximately 100 miles northeast of the main campus. At the Tulsa campus, known as the OU Tulsa Schusterman Center, programs are affiliated with three community hospitals: Hillcrest Medical Center, Saint Francis Hospital, and St. John Medical Center.

In 2008 a $50 million transformational gift from the George Kaiser Family Foundation allowed the OU College of Medicine Tulsa to change its focus. The gift established the OU School of Community Medicine with the goal of improving public health in Oklahoma, where citizens face critical challenges in access to quality healthcare. The school is seeking faculty and students from within Oklahoma and around the nation who have a specific interest in public health and community service. Students learn the diagnosis, treatment and prevention of acute and chronic diseases in whole communities, as well as the full range of primary care and sub-specialties offered in traditional medical programs.

On December 1, 2009, OU president David Boren and University of Tulsa president Steadman Upham jointly announced that the two universities would collaborate to create a four-year medical school in Tulsa. In 2012 it was announced that the Oxley Foundation would donate $30 million toward the development of the OU/TU medical school. The expanded four-year program accepted its first students in the fall of 2015. Part of this expansion includes the construction of a new state-of-the-art medical simulation training facility named the Tandy Education Center. The construction of this 16,000 square foot facility was made possible by a donation from the A.R. and Marylouise Tandy Foundation.

== OU Tulsa Community Health (Bedlam Clinics) ==
Community Health, nicknamed the Bedlam Clinics, has provided healthcare to the indigent and underserved in Tulsa County since 2003.

In addition, the model provides an essential teaching component to OU medical, pharmacy, social work, and nursing students.

== Students ==
Students at the OU School of Community Medicine are given the opportunity to take advantage of Educational grants and forgiveness for service. OUSCM Students are also allowed to take graduate public health courses leading to an MPH or Public Health Certificate at no cost to the student. Students are recruited from all over the country - with an interest in public health and care for the underserved medical community. Applicants are admitted to OU College of Medicine and select the OU School of Community Medicine track.

OUSCM students are given the opportunity to take part in clinical experiences at both the Bedlam Evening and Bedlam Longitudinal clinics (Community Health Clinics), gaining experience working with the underserved and medically vulnerable. Students can also participate in clinical experiences at school based clinics in addition to clinical rotations in a multitude of practice areas.

== Faculty and resident fellows ==
Over 150 OU School of Community Medicine faculty are housed in 10 residency programs and departments, including Family Medicine, Emergency Medicine, Pediatrics, Internal Medicine, Surgery, Obstetrics and Gynecology, Psychiatry, Internal Medicine/Pediatrics, Medical Informatics, and Rural Family Medicine. Clinical faculty are part of OU Physicians, an academic group practice that is part of the OU School of Community Medicine.

Resident fellows, faculty, and staff at the OU School of Community Medicine participate in leadership courses to enhance expertise in principles of community health and clinical teaching.
