= Monarch High School transgender athlete investigation =

Controversy in Florida, United States

In November 2023, a student athlete at Monarch High School in the US state of Florida was outed as transgender. An investigation was opened and continued through 2024, with "serious consequences" promised by the state for those involved in the student's participation on the team.

== Background ==
Monarch High School is a high school in Broward County, Florida, one of the state's most liberal counties. In 2021, Governor Ron DeSantis signed into law the Fairness in Women's Sports Act, banning transgender girls from participating in girls' school sports. In Florida, students wishing to participate in school athletics must verify their sex by attesting to their assigned sex at birth and undergoing a physical examination, which is submitted to the Florida High School Athletic Association.

== Outing and investigation ==
In November 2023, an anonymous tip notified the Broward County School Board that a 16-year-old girl later described as physically frail, who was playing on the school’s volleyball team, was transgender. The student had reportedly played in 33 games.

In response, a state investigation was launched, with the DeSantis administration promising "serious consequences for those responsible" for the student’s participation. For the duration of the investigation, the principal, assistant principal, the athletic director, the coach, and the student's mother – an IT employee at the school – were all reassigned. The coach reportedly stated that he did not know that the student was transgender.

The investigation found that the student's mother, Jessica Norton, had failed to change her daughter's listed gender from female to male in the school records after the law was passed. During the investigation, detectives pulled the student's school records and locked them in a vault, and likewise investigated her elementary school (Winston Park Elementary) and middle school to find out who else knew she was transgender, how her records were changed, and when. According to Norton, state investigators repeatedly misgendered her daughter, and in official documents, the detectives referred to her daughter as "it". Norton stated that during the investigation, rather than being reassigned to clerical work as was the norm, she was forced to perform janitorial services.

== Aftermath ==
After the investigation began, the school’s student body held a walkout, protesting both the investigation itself and the reassignment with chants of "Trans lives matter!" and "Bring back Cecil!" (the reassigned principal). In response, then–Superintendent Peter Licata said that the investigation and reassignments were to ensure that they were "protecting students".

In the aftermath of the investigation, the school was fined $16,500 and placed on one year of probation by the Florida High School Athletic Association. The student was marked ineligible to represent any member school for a period of one year. Superintendent Howard Hepburn recommended in June 2024 that Jessica Norton be fired, while other employees were cleared in the investigation on the grounds of not being aware that the student was transgender.

In a speech before the Broward School Board, Norton said that her daughter had gone from being the class president, student body director of philanthropy, and homecoming princess, to leaving Monarch High School entirely and attending school online. Reportedly, none of the school employees ever checked on her.
