= GlideSlope =

Firm in New York city

- Type: LLC
- Industry: Sports
- Genre: Sports business consulting
- Founded: 2010
- Founder: David Fuller, Dave Mingey, Eric Guthoff
- Defunct: 2017
- Fate: Acquired by CSM Sport & Entertainment
- Headquarters: 133 West 19th Street, 6th Floor, New York, NY 10011, United States
- Key people: David Fuller, Dave Mingey, Eric Guthoff, Tori Stevens
- Website: theglideslope.com

GlideSlope is a management consulting firm involved in global sport. GlideSlope was founded in 2010 and currently headquartered in New York City. In April 2017, GlideSlope was acquired by CSM Sport & Entertainment.

== Description ==
GlideSlope specializes in advising brands on strategies to "leverage global sport as a business driver". It maintains a neutral point of view by not participating in any sponsorship sales, activation, or the representation of athletes.

The company’s services include sport strategy, learning lab workshops, intelligence reporting, analytical insights, opportunity analysis, measurement, and stakeholder integration.

== History ==
GlideSlope was founded by three partners – David Fuller, Dave Mingey and Eric Guthoff – in 2010. Headquartered in DUMBO, Brooklyn. Within two years, the company would establish its headquarters in Manhattan, building out the entire floor of 133 West 19th street.

In 2011, GlideSlope formed a joint venture with Helios Partners, an international sports marketing agency owned by French media and event company, the Armoury Group. The JV, named HGS, came a year after the two companies partnered to become the Olympic agency of record for Dow Chemical.

In 2014, Helios and GlideSlope ended their partnership and GlideSlope retained Dow’s Olympic business.

GlideSlope worked extensively with brands to better understand sports and social unrest, particularly in the lead-up to the 2014 World Cup and the 2016 Summer Olympics, both hosted in Brazil.

Currently, GlideSlope is advising Citi on their global sports sponsorship, which includes USOC and NBC sponsorship. Other clients –past and present - include Procter & Gamble, Dow, McDonald’s, The North Face, Johnson & Johnson, Bridgestone, GoPro, USG, Gatorade, Pepsi and ABInBev. GlideSlope also selected A Ganar – a Partners of the Americas organization – as a pro bono client.

In March 2015, GlideSlope hosted a panel at the annual South by Southwest Interactive in Austin, Texas. The “Sport for Development: Affecting Societal Change” panel included GlideSlope president, Dave Mingey, Olympic gold medalist, Joey Cheek, director of Laureus Sport for Good Foundation, Matt Geschke, and director of sport for development at Partners of the Americas, Paul Teeple.

GlideSlope was acquired by CSM Sport & Entertainment in 2017.

== Academic partnerships ==
- NYU
- University of Oregon Warsaw Marketing Center

== Founders ==
David Fuller is a business strategist and marketing executive. He has held executive positions in strategy and operations at Ogilvy and R/GA, and was a partner at Mother New York, where he worked on experiential marketing. He has managed advertising, digital, and social media campaigns for brands including Virgin, Dell, Nike, Walmart, and Jaguar Cars.

Dave Mingey was a VP of marketing at Pepsi-Cola and also the director of global Olympic marketing for Johnson & Johnson from 2005 to 2009. In 2009, Sports Business Journal named him one of “Forty-Under-Forty” top sports executives.

Eric Guthoff was a global director at IMG in their Olympic Consulting Division. Sports Business Journal named him to the “Forty-Under-Forty” class of 2015, as a top sports executive in the industry.
