= 1996 United States Senate election in Oklahoma =

- November 5, 1996
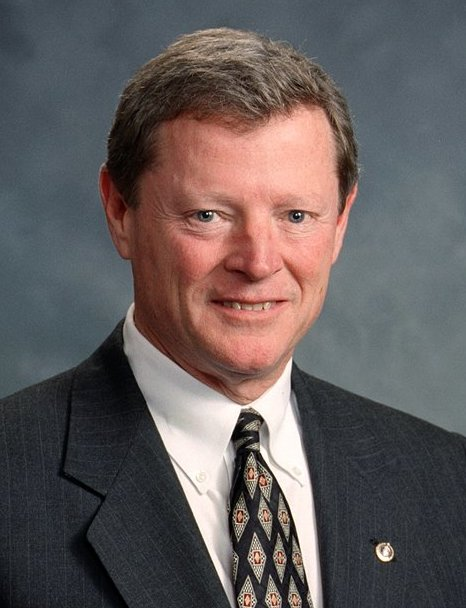

Nominee	Jim Inhofe	James Boren
Party	Republican	Democratic
Popular vote	670,610	474,162
Percentage	56.68%	40.08%
- County results Inhofe: 40–50% 50–60% 60–70% 70–80% Boren: 40–50% 50–60% 60–70%
U.S. senator before election
Jim Inhofe
Republican
Elected U.S. Senator
Jim Inhofe
Republican

The 1996 United States Senate election in Oklahoma was held on November 5, 1996. Incumbent Republican U.S. Senator Jim Inhofe, first elected in a 1994 special election, won re-election to his first full term. This election is the first time that a Republican was re-elected to the Class 2 Senate seat from Oklahoma.

== Republican primary ==
=== Candidates ===
- Jim Inhofe, incumbent U.S. Senator
- Dan Lowe

=== Results ===
Republican primary results
Party	Candidate	Votes	%
Republican	James M. Inhofe (Incumbent)	116,241	75.34%
Republican	Dan Lowe	38,044	24.66%
Total votes		154,285	100.00%

== Libertarian primary ==
=== Candidates ===
- Michael A. Clem
- Agnes Marie Regier

=== Results ===
Libertarian primary results
Party	Candidate	Votes	%
Libertarian	Agnes Marie Regier	1,511	51.39%
Libertarian	Michael A. Clem	1,429	48.61%
Total votes		2,940	100.00%

== Democratic primary ==
=== Candidates ===
- Don McCorkell
- Jim Boren, former chief of staff to Senator Ralph Yarborough
- David Louis Annanders

=== Results ===
Democratic primary results
Party	Candidate	Votes	%
Democratic	Jim Boren	186,611	55.53%
Democratic	Don McCorkell	122,635	36.49%
Democratic	David Louis Annanders	26,794	7.97%
Total votes		336,040	100.00%

== Results ==
General election results
Party	Candidate	Votes	%
Republican	Jim Inhofe (incumbent)	670,610	56.68%
Democratic	Jim Boren	474,162	40.08%
Independent	Bill Maguire	15,092	1.28%
Libertarian	Agnes Marie Regier	14,595	1.23%
Independent	Chris Nedbalek	8,691	0.73%
Republican hold			

== See also ==
- 1996 United States Senate elections
