= Jim Inhofe =

American politician (1934–2024)

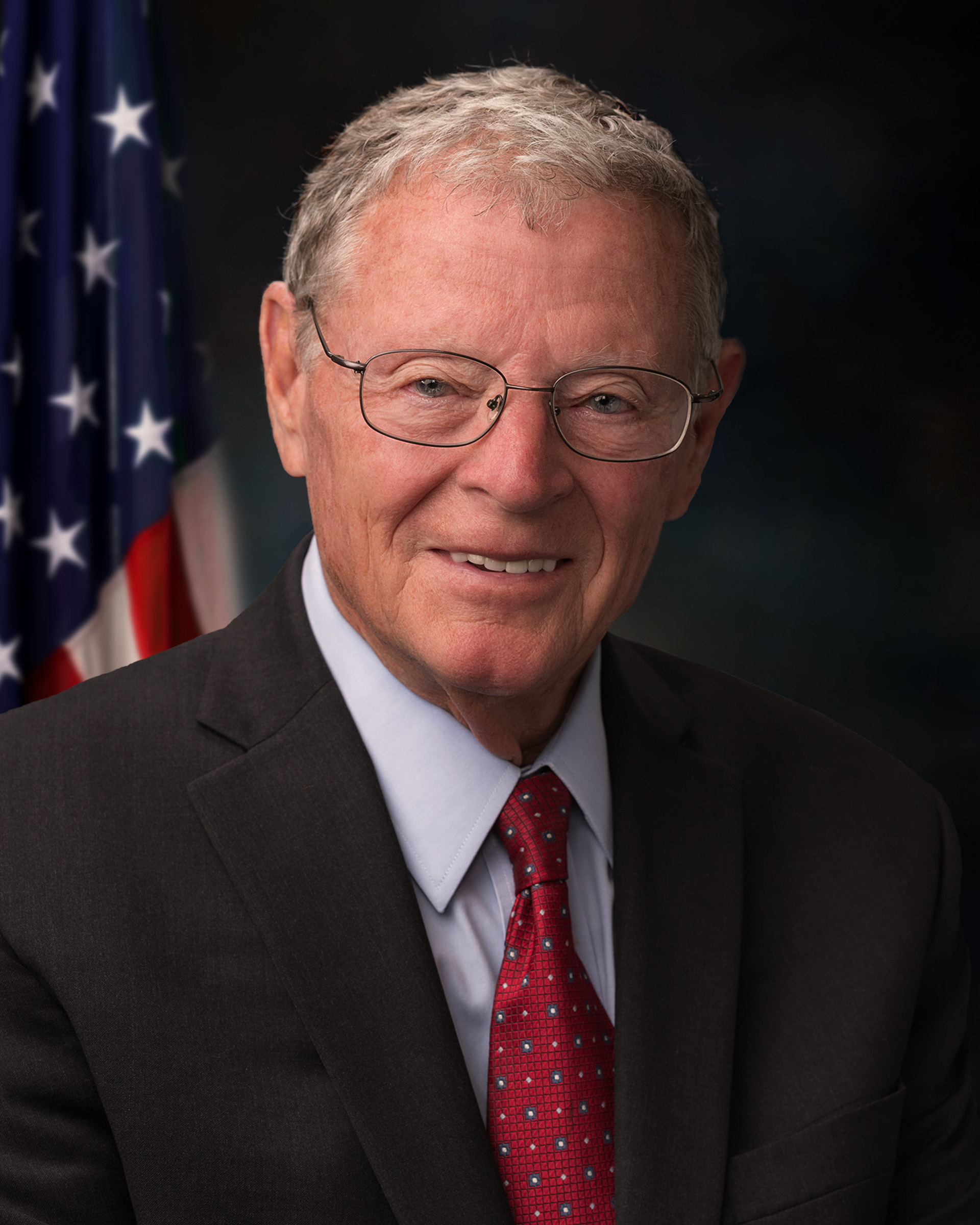
- Official portrait, 2018

United States Senator from Oklahoma
- In office November 17, 1994 – January 3, 2023
- Preceded by: David Boren
- Succeeded by: Markwayne Mullin
Senate positions
Chair of the Senate Armed Services Committee
In office September 6, 2018 (Note: Served as acting chairman in the absence of John McCain from December 2017 – September 6, 2018) – February 3, 2021
Preceded by	John McCain
Succeeded by	Jack Reed
Chair of the Senate Environment Committee
In office January 3, 2015 – January 3, 2017
Preceded by	Barbara Boxer
Succeeded by	John Barrasso
In office January 3, 2003 – January 3, 2007
Preceded by	Jim Jeffords
Succeeded by	Barbara Boxer

Member of the U.S. House of Representatives from Oklahoma's 1st district
- In office January 3, 1987 – November 15, 1994
- Preceded by: James R. Jones
- Succeeded by: Steve Largent

32nd Mayor of Tulsa
- In office May 2, 1978 – May 8, 1984
- Preceded by: Robert LaFortune
- Succeeded by: Terry Young

Minority Leader of the Oklahoma Senate
- In office January 1975 – February 1976
- Preceded by: Donald Ferrell
- Succeeded by: Stephen Wolfe

Member of the Oklahoma Senate from the 35th district
- In office January 7, 1969 – January 4, 1977
- Preceded by: Beauchamp Selman
- Succeeded by: Warren Green

Member of the Oklahoma House of Representatives from the 70th district
- In office December 29, 1966 – January 7, 1969
- Preceded by: Joseph McGraw
- Succeeded by: Richard Hancock

Personal details
- Born: James Mountain Inhofe; November 17, 1934 Des Moines, Iowa, U.S.
- Died: July 9, 2024 (aged 89) Tulsa, Oklahoma, U.S.
- Party: Republican
- Spouse: Kay Kirkpatrick (m. 1959)
- Children: 4, including Molly
- Relatives: Glade Kirkpatrick (father-in-law)
- Education: University of Tulsa (BA)

Military service
- Allegiance: United States
- Branch/service: United States Army
- Years of service: 1957–1958
- Rank: Specialist 4
- Inhofe's voice Inhofe discusses amendments to S.14, the Energy Policy Act of 2003. Recorded June 5, 2003

James Mountain Inhofe (/ˈɪnhɒf/; INN-hoff; November 17, 1934 – July 9, 2024) was an American politician who served from 1994 to 2023 as a United States senator from Oklahoma. A member of the Republican Party, he was the longest-serving U.S. senator from Oklahoma. He served in various elected offices in Oklahoma for nearly 60 years, between 1966 and 2023.

Born in Des Moines, Iowa, in 1934, Inhofe moved with his parents to Tulsa, Oklahoma, in 1942. His father, Perry Inhofe, was an owner of insurance companies and his mother, Blanche Inhofe (née Mountain), was a Tulsa socialite. Jim was a high school track star and graduated from Central High School. He briefly attended the University of Colorado before finishing his college degree at the University of Tulsa. He was drafted to the United States Army in 1956 and served between 1957 and 1958. He became vice-president of his father's insurance company in 1961 and president after his father's death in 1970.

Inhofe was an elected official representing the Tulsa area for nearly three decades. He represented parts of Tulsa in the Oklahoma House of Representatives from 1966 to 1969 and the Oklahoma Senate from 1969 to 1977. During his time in the state legislature he was known for feuding with the Democratic Party's state leadership, particularly Governor David Hall and state treasurer Leo Winters, and spearheading the movement to bring the USS Batfish to Oklahoma. While a state senator, he ran for governor of Oklahoma in the 1974 election and the U.S. House in 1976. He was elected to three terms as the mayor of Tulsa, serving from 1978 to 1984. He served in the United States House of Representatives representing Oklahoma's 1st congressional district from 1987 to 1994; he resigned after his election to the United States Senate.

During his Senate career, Inhofe was known for his rejection of climate science; on one occasion, he displayed a snowball in winter on the U.S. Senate floor as evidence that Earth was not warming. He was also known for his support of constitutional amendments to ban same-sex marriage and the 2006 Inhofe Amendment to make English the national language of the United States. Inhofe chaired the U.S. Senate Committee on Environment and Public Works (EPW) and the Armed Services Committee.

== Family, early life, and education ==
James Mountain Inhofe was born in Des Moines, Iowa, on November 17, 1934, the son of Blanche (née Mountain) and Perry Dyson Inhofe. He moved with his family to Tulsa, Oklahoma, after his father became president of the National Mutual Casualty company in August 1942. His father, Perry Inhofe, was educated at Duke University and worked as a lawyer, president of multiple insurance companies, and banker. In 1949, his company, Tri-State, was ordered by the National Labor Relations Board to cease discouraging union membership. His father was also active in the Tulsa Chamber of Commerce and YMCA; and he was the official sponsor of Miss Tulsa and Miss Oklahoma winner Louise O'Brien in 1950. His mother was a Tulsa socialite and hosted guests such as Johnston Murray.

Inhofe's family had been involved in Oklahoma politics since the 1950s. His father, Perry Inhofe, had served on the executive committee for Democratic governor Raymond D. Gary's successful 1954 campaign. In 1958, his brother, Perry Jr., ran an unsuccessful campaign for the Oklahoma House of Representatives as a Democrat.

=== Education, military and business careers ===
Inhofe started kindergarten in Des Moines, Iowa, but moved halfway through the year to Hazel Dell in Springfield, Illinois. He skipped first grade after the schoolhouse burned down and started second grade after his family moved to Tulsa at Barnard Elementary School. As a teenager, he would "hire Indians to pick wild blackberries" and then sell them in his neighborhood. He went on to attend Woodrow Wilson Junior High and Tulsa Central High School, where he was a member of his high school's track team. In 1952, his mile relay quartet team broke a school record with a 3:32.6 time. In January 1953, he was elected treasurer of the Brones social club; he graduated from Central High School later that year. He attended the University of Colorado for three months and worked as a bartender.

In 1956, he received a draft letter from the United States Army and he served from 1957 to 1958. He attained the rank of Specialist 4 and spent most of his service performing quartermaster duties at Fort Lee, Virginia. In 1961, his father formed a new life insurance company, Quaker Insurance, and Inhofe was appointed vice president. On June 17, 1970, Perry Inhofe died of a heart attack; Inhofe became president of Quaker Life Insurance and vice president of Mid-Continental Casualty Co. and Oklahoma Surety Co., while his brother Perry Jr. became president of Mid-Continental and Surety and vice president of Quaker Life. Inhofe and his brother eventually ended up in litigation over the companies that ended in 1990 with Perry paying his brother $3 million.

==== College graduation scandal ====
Inhofe received a B.A. in economics from the University of Tulsa in 1973. Until his 1994 U.S. Senate campaign, his official biographies and news articles about him said he had graduated in 1959. Inhofe initially denied the stories that uncovered the discrepancy but later acknowledged them. After admitting that the stories were true, he said he had been allowed to take part in graduation ceremonies in 1959 though he was a few credits short of completing his degree, and did not finish his coursework until 1973.

== State legislative career ==
=== Oklahoma House of Representatives ===
In February 1966, Inhofe launched his first campaign for office as a Republican; he ran for the Oklahoma House of Representatives's 71st district against incumbent representative Warren Green. He lost the May primary election and then worked on J. Robert Wooten's 1966 lieutenant gubernatorial campaign as the Tulsa County campaign chair. In November 1966, Joseph McGraw resigned from the Oklahoma House of Representatives 70th district to run for newly elected governor Dewey Bartlett's former state senate seat, triggering a special election. Inhofe was the first to announce his campaign for McGraw's former house seat. He won the Republican primary and the general election. He was sworn in December 29, 1966. During his time in the State House, Inhofe formed a close friendship with Democratic Representative David Boren.

In the Oklahoma House, Inhofe's first successful measure was a bill to allow for personalized license plates in Oklahoma that passed during his first legislative session. During his first term, he spoke against federal regulation at the United States House Committee on Public Works Sub-committee on Roads and voted in favor of an abortion liberalization law. In 1968, he served as the vice-chair of the rules committee for the Oklahoma Republican Party state convention. That May, he announced he would not seek re-election to the Oklahoma House of Representatives and instead would challenge Democrat state senator Beauchamp Selman for his seat in the next election.

=== Oklahoma Senate ===
==== Election, first term, and USS Batfish ====
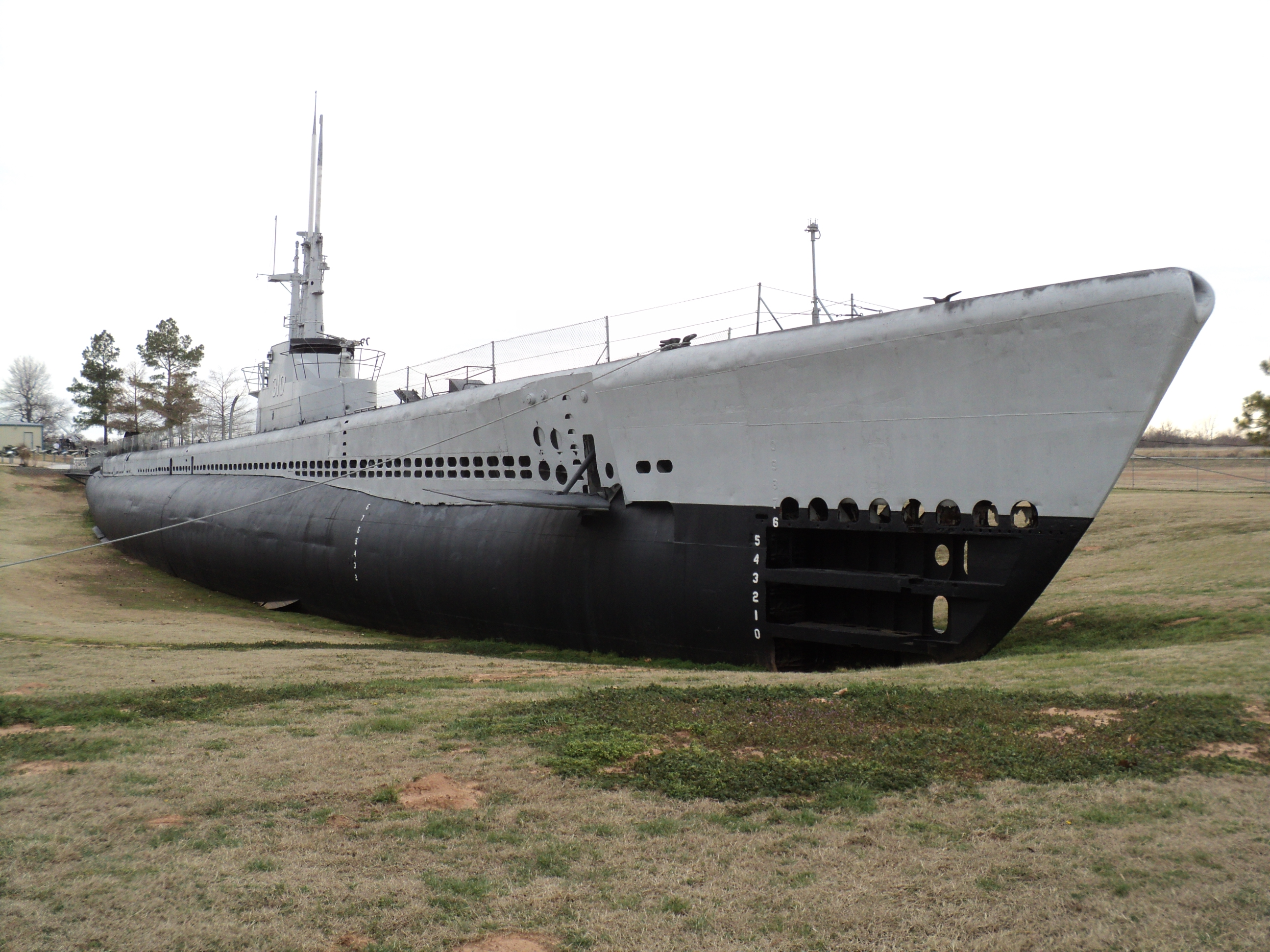
The USS Batfish museum ship in Muskogee, Oklahoma, in 2013

After Inhofe had already announced his campaign for the Oklahoma Senate, Beauchamp Selman announced he would not seek reelection, creating an open seat for the 1968 election. He faced Madison J. Bowers, who was endorsed by the Political Action Committee of Educators, in the Republican primary election. He won the primary and faced Democratic nominee Jerry L. Goodman in the general election. Governor Dewey Bartlett knocked doors with Inhofe during his campaign and he won the general election. After winning the special election, Republican party officials began considering Inhofe as a potential future U.S. Senate candidate.

In 1969, he was the chairman of the Tulsa County Republican Convention and supported efforts to liberalize abortions laws in Oklahoma in the 32nd Oklahoma Legislature that passed the Oklahoma House of Representatives but failed in Senate committee. Republican party officials tried to recruit Inhofe to run for Treasurer of Oklahoma in 1970, but he declined. In 1970, Governor Dewey Bartlett created the Oklahoma Narcotics and Drug Abuse Council and appointed Inhofe as an inaugural member. That November, he was elected minority caucus chair of the Oklahoma Senate for the 33rd Oklahoma Legislature. In 1971, Inhofe served as the chairman of the Oklahoma Republican Party's State Convention. While Inhofe had initially filed a resolution for Oklahoma to ratify the Equal Rights Amendment in 1972, he retracted his support later that year.

In 1969, Inhofe sponsored a successful bill to bring a retired U.S. Navy submarine to Oklahoma. Inhofe initially wanted the USS Piranha for Tulsa, but it was determined that the Arkansas River was too shallow for the ship to travel that far upriver. The Muskogee City-County Trust Port Authority donated five acres of waterfront property to locate the ship in Muskogee. In September 1970, the USS Batfish was considered as an alternative and on December 9, 1971, the Batfish was given to the State of Oklahoma. The ship was unofficially opened to the public July 4, 1972, with its official opening on Memorial Day 1973.

==== 1972 campaigning and second term ====
In 1972, Inhofe was appointed to serve as co-chair for Richard Nixon's 1972 presidential campaign in Oklahoma with Ralph Gordon Thompson. During the campaign, Inhofe solicited Barry Goldwater to write a letter of endorsement for Nixon's campaign in Oklahoma to win over conservative Republicans and he represented Oklahoma at the 1972 Republican National Convention. He also worked on U.S. senator Dewey Bartlett's campaign as the co-chair for Oklahoma's 1st congressional district. In his own district, Inhofe faced no Republican primary challenge and faced Democratic nominee Happy Miles in the general election. He won the general election by over 7,000 votes; afterward, he was elected by fellow Republican state senators to serve as the assistant floor leader in the 34th Oklahoma Legislature. He was elected minority leader of the Oklahoma Senate for the 35th Oklahoma Legislature to succeed Donald Ferrell who had lost re-election. In April 1975, he appointed the first blind page in Oklahoma history: 15 year-old Angela Keele. Later that year, Inhofe and Charles Ford wrote an article criticizing David Boren and spending by the Democratic Party in a party newspaper. Newspapers in the state responded by pointing out Inhofe had supported just as much spending; the article was syndicated by the Associated Press and Inhofe responded by publishing a Tulsa World op-ed arguing he had tried to amend bills to remove wasteful spending and was consistently critical of spending. He did not seek a third term to the Oklahoma Legislature and was succeeded as minority leader by Senator Stephen Wolfe.

===== 1974 gubernatorial election =====
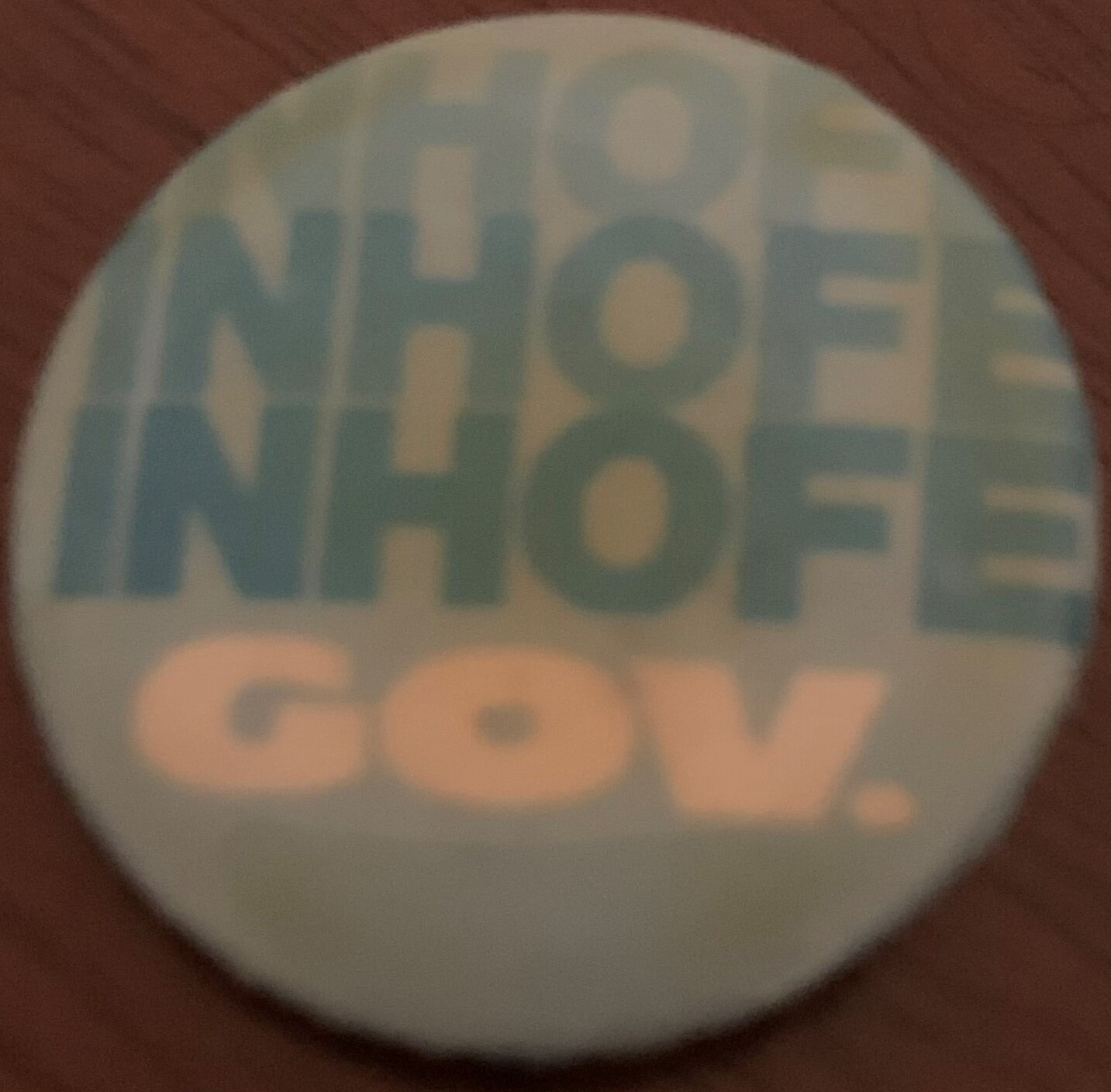
A campaign button for Inhofe's 1974 gubernatorial campaign

Inhofe had been floated as a potential gubernatorial candidate since 1972. He was considered a strong candidate, his only weaknesses being his feuding with Leo Winters and the backlash to the USS Batfish project. By May 1973, he was openly campaigning but had yet to announce his candidacy. In October, he was polling behind Denzil Garrison in the Republican primary 35% to 65%. Inhofe launched his campaign in May 1974. The main issue in both the Republican and Democratic primary campaigns was corruption during the term of incumbent Democratic governor David Hall. Inhofe defeated Garrison in the August primary. During the campaign, he lost 57 pounds and was down to 148 pounds.

In a 2011 interview, Inhofe said that he and David Boren both had been upset with Hall, so they both decided to campaign against him; Boren would primary him as a Democrat to weaken his campaign and Inhofe would run as the Republican challenger and defeat him. The plan was thrown off when Boren won the Democratic nomination. In October, then-President Gerald Ford visited Oklahoma to campaign for Inhofe. A poll later that month by The Daily Oklahoman showed Boren leading Inhofe 74%–25%. Inhofe lost to Boren, 64%–36%.

===== 1976 congressional election =====
In 1976, State Senator Frank Keating announced his campaign for Oklahoma's 1st congressional district and announced that Inhofe would be the master of ceremonies at his campaign launch announcement, but Inhofe did not appear at Keating's announcement and instead announced he was considering his own campaign. Inhofe officially announced his candidacy on February 19, 1976. In the Republican primary, he defeated Keating and Tulsa Public Schools board member Mary Warner, 67%–25%–8%. In a 2011 interview, he credited his primary win to the use of the "Kasten Plan", a system of precinct organization. He also criticized Democratic presidential candidate, and U.S. senator from Oklahoma, Fred Harris during his presidential primary campaign.

During the primary, Inhofe had called for Democratic incumbent James R. Jones to be expelled from Congress for his conviction while in office for failing to report campaign contributions. Inhofe also criticized a donation Jones had received from Ross Perot, but retracted his accusation that the donation affected Jones's voting record after threats from Perot and his lawyers. Inhofe was endorsed by the American Conservative Union and National Conservative Political Action Committee during the general election. Former California governor and future president Ronald Reagan endorsed and campaigned with Inhofe. He was also endorsed by President Gerald Ford, U.S. representative John Rousselot of California, and the Tulsa Tribune. Polling before the election showed Jones leading Inhofe, 44% to 36%. In the general election, Jones won by 54%–45%.

== Mayor of Tulsa ==
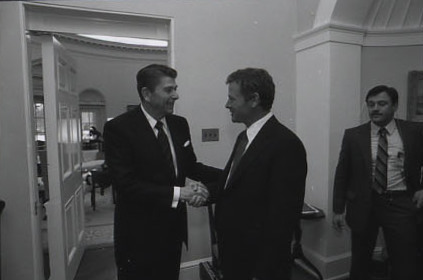
Inhofe greeting President Ronald Reagan in 1982

In January 1978, the Tulsa Daily World reported Republican party officials were courting Inhofe to run for Mayor of Tulsa. He initially denied he would run for any city office and instead insisted he was considering a rematch against Congressman Jones, but Inhofe announced his mayoral campaign in February. He won the Republican primary with over 92% of the vote, defeating Keith Robinson and Paul Cull. During the first three weeks of the primary, he was injured with a broken leg from a tennis injury and could not campaign. In the general election against Rodger Randle, he was endorsed by then-Mayor Robert LaFortune and U.S. senator Dewey Bartlett. Randle had won the Democratic primary with a coalition of labor union and black voters, and Inhofe was supported in the general election by his Republican base, anti-union and anti-black Democrats, and 22% of black voters. In April, he was elected mayor of Tulsa, defeating Randle, 51%–46%. The Tulsa Daily World heralded the race as Inhofe's "first general election victory in six years, and Randle's first election loss since he entered politics in 1970." The race broke then-fundraising records for a Tulsa mayoral election with Randle raising $78,062 and Inhofe raising $48,987. Inhofe's biggest donors were the Metropolitan Builder's Association, oilman Robert L. Parker, and Paul D. Hinch.

On May 2, he was sworn in as Mayor of Tulsa. Inhofe's first proclamation as mayor was to celebrate Sun Day and support alternative energy; in the proclamation he said, "I think we're all interested in looking for alternative sources of energy. And of course, we want clean sources." In his first month in office, he decried the city's reliance on federal funding, promised to "seek minorities to fill positions in city government, and nominated Jewish, senior citizen, anti-abortion, and Christian fundamentalist members to the Tulsa Human Rights Commission. In January 1979, Inhofe attended the first swearing in of a governor of Oklahoma to occur in Tulsa when George Nigh was sworn in to serve the last five days of David Boren's term after Boren was elected to the U.S. Senate. In February, he appointed Ronald L. Young, the first African-American to ever serve on the City Commission. In December 1979, Inhofe officially announced his re-election campaign for a second term as mayor. He ran unopposed in the Republican primary and later won the general election, fending off Democratic nominee Richard Johnson and Independent candidate Robert Murphy. He broke Rodger Randle's record fundraising for a Tulsa mayoral race set in the last election by raising $87,667.

In 1982, he was reelected with 59% of the vote. He lost his 1984 reelection campaign to Terry Young.

== U.S. House of Representatives ==
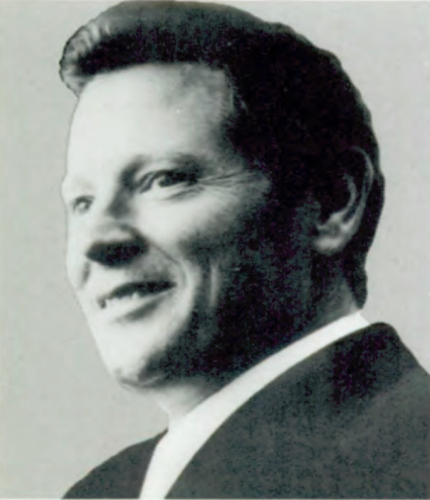
Jim Inhofe's official 100th United States Congress photo taken in 1987 after his first election to the United States House of Representatives

=== Elections ===
In 1986, when Representative James R. Jones decided to retire to run for the U.S. Senate, Inhofe ran for the 1st District and won the Republican primary with 54% of the vote. In the general election, he defeated Democrat Gary Allison 55%–43%. In 1988, he won reelection against Democrat Kurt Glassco 53%–47%. In 1990, he defeated Glassco again, 56%–44%. After redistricting, the 1st District contained only two counties, all of Tulsa and some parts of Wagoner. In 1992, Inhofe was reelected with 53% of the vote.

=== Tenure ===
In 1987, Inhofe voted against President Ronald Reagan's budget, which included tax increases and no increase in defense spending.

He first came to national attention in 1993, when he led the effort to reform the House's discharge petition rule, which the House leadership had long used to bottle up bills in committee.

== U.S. Senate ==
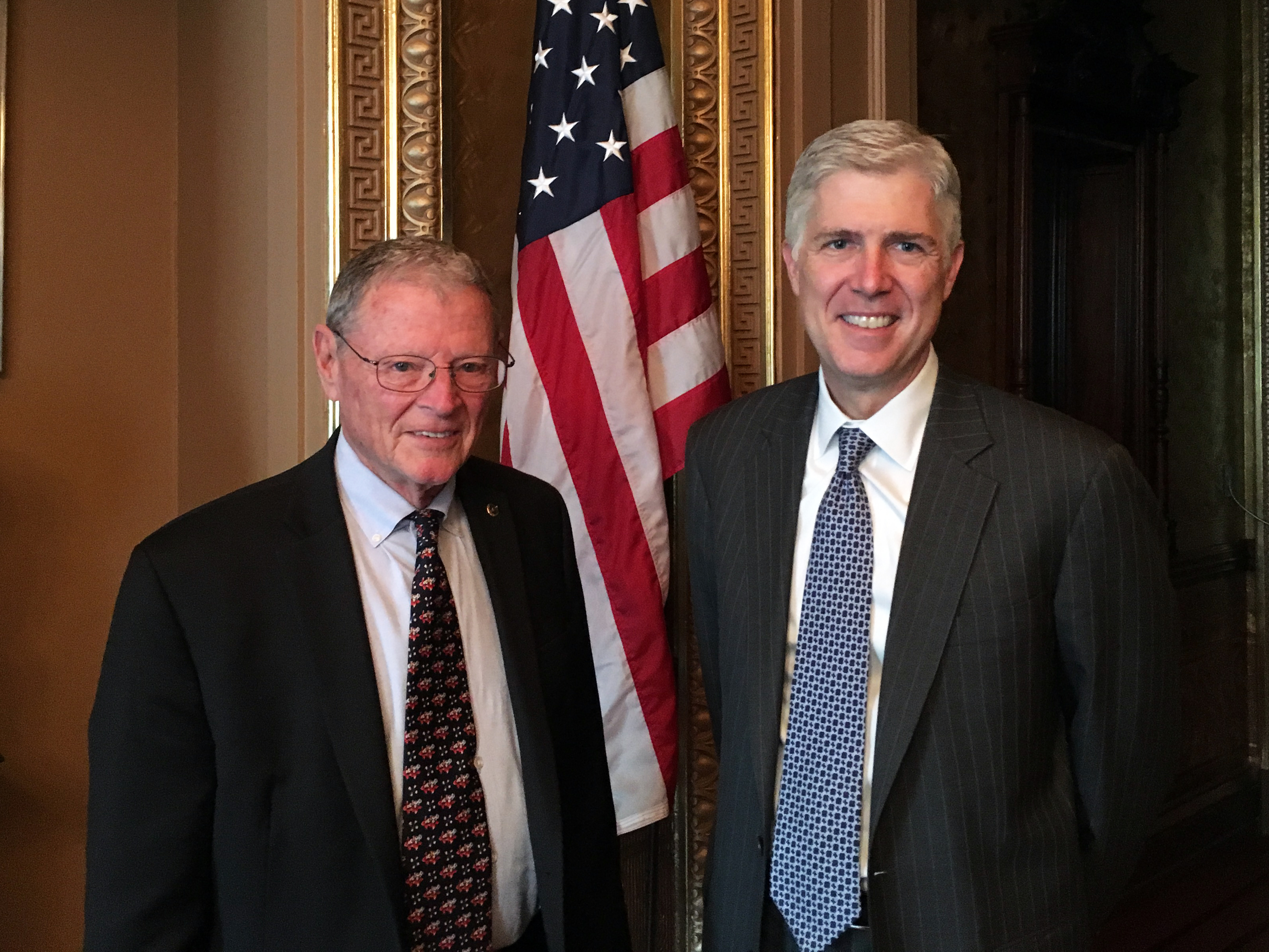
Inhofe meeting with Neil Gorsuch in March 2017

Inhofe was the longest-serving U.S. senator from Oklahoma, having served between 1994 and 2023.

=== Elections ===
In 1994, incumbent senator David Boren, who had served in the Senate since 1979, agreed to become president of the University of Oklahoma and announced he would resign as soon as a successor was elected. A special election was scheduled, in which Inhofe defeated Congressman Dave McCurdy. 1994 also saw the Republican Party take both houses of the U.S. Congress and the Oklahoma governorship.

Inhofe took office on November 17, giving him more seniority than the incoming class of senators. After serving the last two years of Boren's term, he won his first full term in 1996. He was reelected in 2002, 2008, 2014, and 2020.

=== Tenure ===
==== Fundraising ====
In the 2008 election cycle, Inhofe's largest campaign donors represented the oil and gas ($446,900 in donations), leadership PACs ($316,720), and electric utilities ($221,654) industries/categories. In 2010, his largest donors represented the oil and gas ($429,950) and electric ($206,654) utilities.

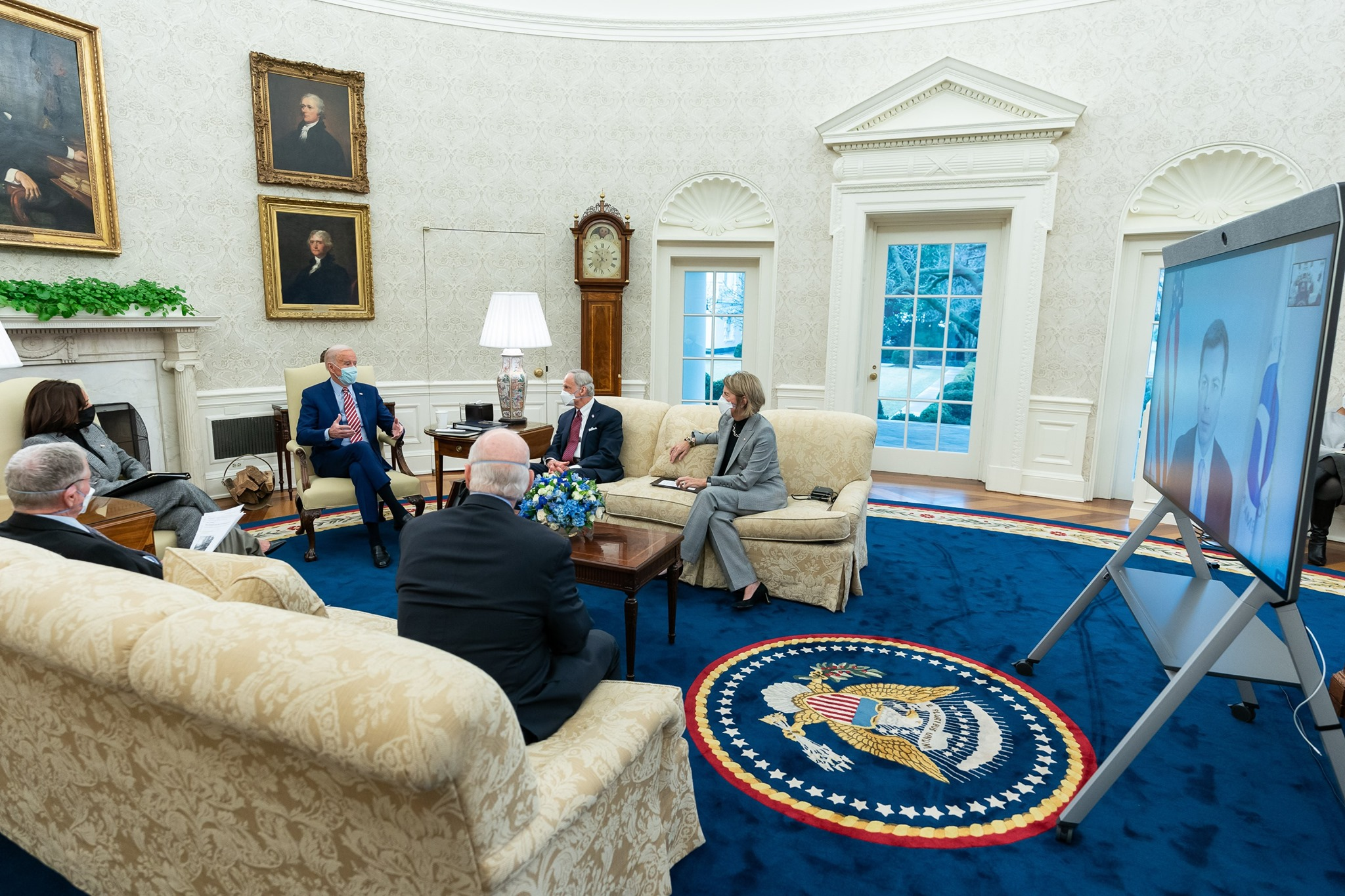
Inhofe meeting with President Joe Biden and Vice President Kamala Harris, February 11, 2021

The primary PACs donating to his campaigns were Aircraft Owners & Pilots Association ($55,869), United Parcel Service ($51,850), National Association of Realtors ($51,700), NRA Political Victory Fund ($51,050), and American Medical Association ($51,000). Additionally, if company-sponsored PACs were combined with employee contributions, Koch Industries would be Inhofe's largest contributor, with $90,950 according to OpenSecrets.

==== Armed Services Committee ====
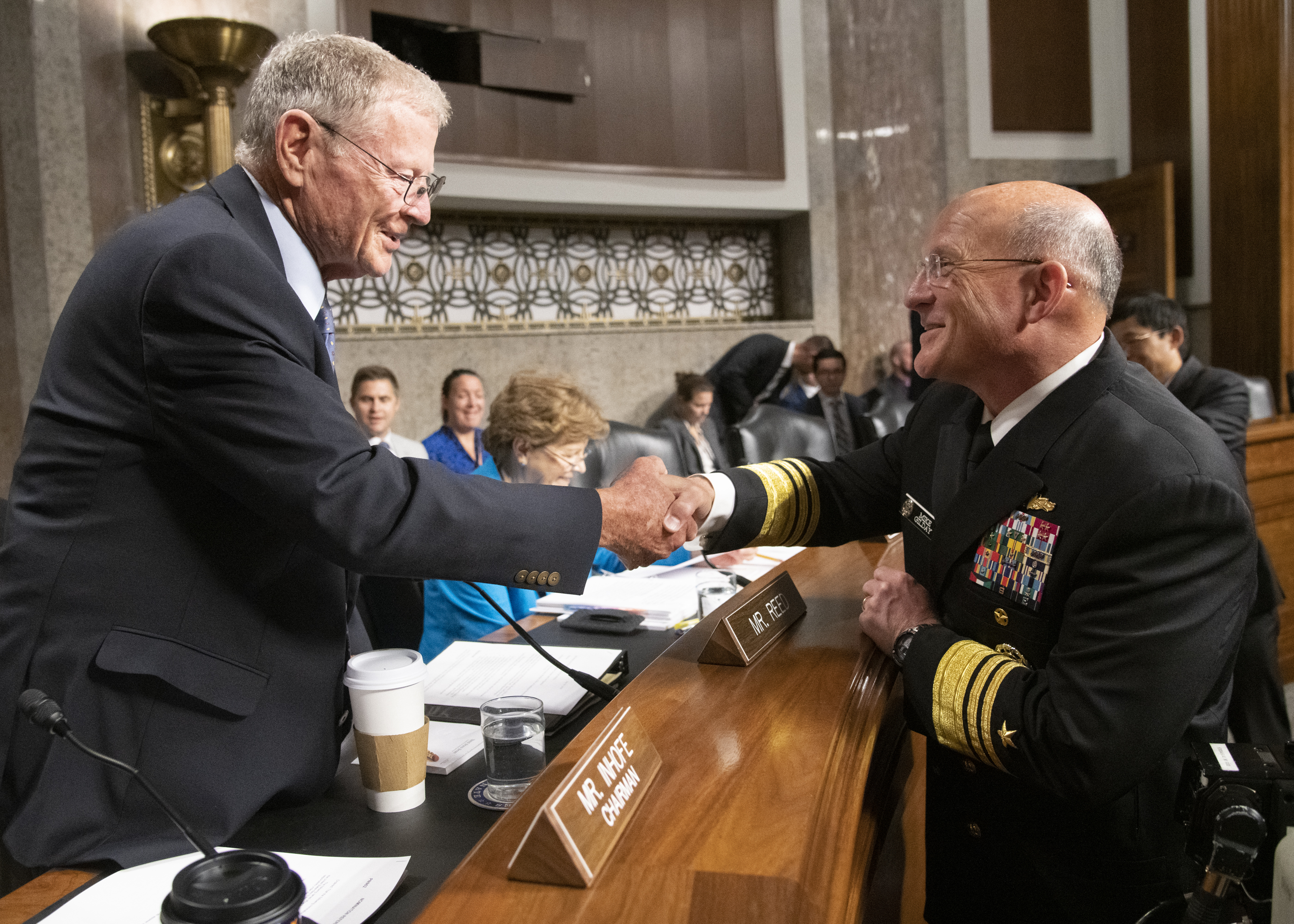
Inhofe shakes hands with Vice Admiral Michael M. Gilday, director of the Joint Staff, before his confirmation hearing for the position of Chief of Naval Operations at the Dirksen Senate Office Building in Washington, D.C., July 31, 2019.

As a member of the Armed Services Committee, Inhofe was among the panelists questioning witnesses about the 2004 Abu Ghraib prisoner abuse, saying he was "outraged by the outrage" over the revelations of abuse. Although he believed that the individuals responsible for mistreating prisoners should be punished, he said that the prisoners "are not there for traffic violations ... they're murderers, they're terrorists, they're insurgents". In 2006, Inhofe was one of only nine senators to vote against the Detainee Treatment Act of 2005, which prohibits "cruel, inhuman or degrading" treatment of individuals in U.S. Government custody.

When chairman of the Senate Armed Services Committee John McCain was absent seeking medical treatment for brain cancer, Inhofe became acting chairman of the committee. During this time, Inhofe helped secure the passage of the record $716 billion National Defense Authorization Act for Fiscal Year 2019. McCain died in August 2018, and Inhofe lauded him as his "hero". Inhofe also said that McCain was "partially to blame for" the White House's controversial decision to raise flags back to full mast after less than two days, as McCain previously "disagreed with the President in certain areas and wasn't too courteous about it".

On March 6, 2019, Inhofe said he intended to put language in the next defense authorization act to reinforce President Donald Trump's decision to withdraw from the Iran nuclear agreement and reintroduce severe sanctions on Tehran.

==== Committee assignments and caucus membership ====
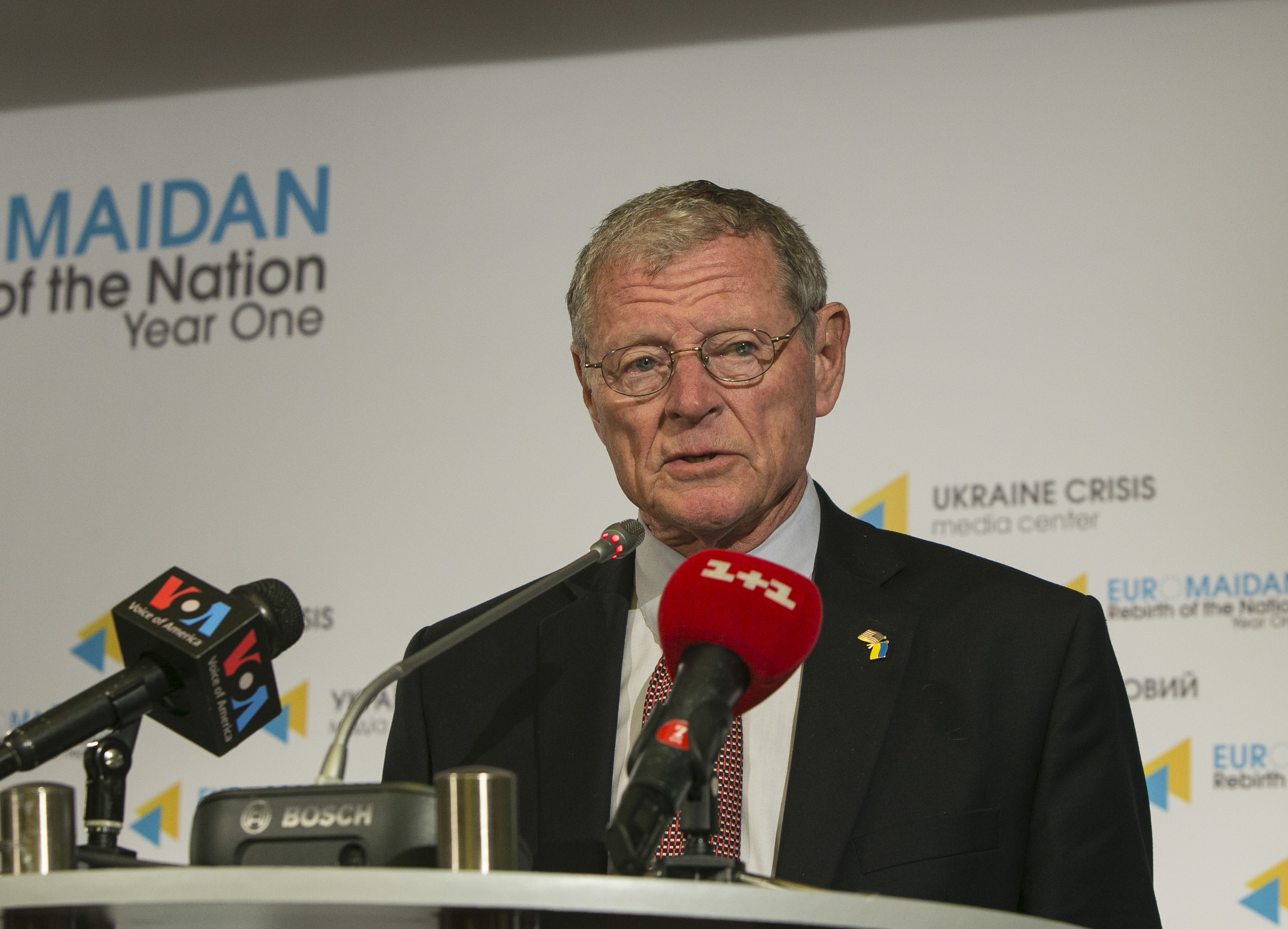
CODEL James Inhofe during a visit to Kyiv, Ukraine, October 27–28, 2014

During the 115th, 116th, and 117th Congresses, Inhofe was a member of the following committees:

- Committee on Armed Services
  - Subcommittee on Airland
  - Subcommittee on Readiness and Management Support
  - Subcommittee on Strategic Forces
- Committee on Commerce, Science, and Transportation
- Committee on Environment and Public Works
- Committee on Small Business and Entrepreneurship

Caucus memberships

- International Conservation Caucus
- Senate Army Caucus
- Senate Diabetes Caucus
- Senate General Aviation Caucus
- Senate Rural Health Caucus
- Senate Tourism Caucus
- Sportsmen's Caucus

=== Retirement ===
On July 15, 2021, Inhofe told Tulsa World he planned to retire at the end of his current term, in 2027. In February 2022, The New York Times reported that Inhofe was planning to resign at the end of the 117th Congress. A special election for Inhofe's replacement was held in 2022 while he remained in office. He endorsed his former chief of staff, Luke Holland, in the special election. Oklahoma's 2nd congressional district Congressman Markwayne Mullin won the Republican primary and the special election. Inhofe resigned on January 3, 2023. It was reported in February 2023 that the primary reason for Inhofe's resignation was his symptoms of long COVID, which had severely limited his capacity to do day-to-day activities, after an initial infection he had called "very mild".

== Political positions ==
Inhofe was ranked the most conservative member of Congress on the 2017 GovTrack report card. He received the same ranking for 2018. For 2019, he was ranked as the fifth-most conservative member of the U.S. Senate with a score of 0.91 out of 1, behind Marsha Blackburn, Joni Ernst, Mike Braun, and Ted Cruz.

=== Environmental issues ===
Inhofe was known for his denial of climate change, which he called a "hoax", and his defense of the oil industry, a major industry in Oklahoma. In December 1997, Inhofe called the Kyoto Protocol, an international treaty to reduce greenhouse gas emissions into the atmosphere, a "political, economic, and national security fiasco."

==== Committee on Environment and Public Works ====
Before Republicans regained control of the Senate in the 2002 elections, Inhofe had compared the United States Environmental Protection Agency to a Gestapo bureaucracy, and EPA Administrator Carol Browner to Tokyo Rose. In January 2003, he became Chair of the Senate Committee on Environment and Public Works, and continued challenging mainstream science in favor of what he called "sound science", in accordance with the Luntz memo.

Beginning in 2003, when he was first elected Chair of the Senate Committee on Environment and Public Works, Inhofe was the foremost Republican promoting climate change denial. He famously claimed in the Senate that global warming is a hoax, invited contrarians to testify in Committee hearings, and spread his views via the Committee website run by Marc Morano as well as through his access to conservative media. In 2012, Inhofe's The Greatest Hoax: How the Global Warming Conspiracy Threatens Your Future was published by WorldNetDaily Books, presenting his global warming conspiracy theory. He said that, because "God's still up there", the "arrogance of people to think that we, human beings, would be able to change what He is doing in the climate is to me outrageous", but also that he appreciated that this argument was unpersuasive, and that he "never pointed to Scriptures in a debate, because I know this would discredit me."

As Environment and Public Works chairman, Inhofe gave a two-hour Senate floor speech on July 28, 2003, in the context of discussions on the McCain-Lieberman Bill. He said he was "going to expose the most powerful, most highly financed lobby in Washington, the far left environmental extremists", and laid out in detail his opposition to attribution of recent climate change to humans, using the word "hoax" four times, including the statement that he had "offered compelling evidence that catastrophic global warming is a hoax" and his conclusion that "manmade global warming is the greatest hoax ever perpetrated on the American people". He supported what he called "sound science", citing contrarian scientists such as Patrick Michaels, Fred Singer, Richard Lindzen, and Sallie Baliunas as well as some mainstream scientists. Two of these, Tom Wigley and Stephen Schneider, later issued statements that Inhofe had misrepresented their work.

On July 29, the day after his Senate speech, Inhofe chaired an Environment and Public Works hearing with contrarian views represented by Baliunas and David Legates, and praised their "1,000-year climate study", then involved in the Soon and Baliunas controversy, as "a powerful new work of science". Against them, Michael E. Mann defended mainstream science and specifically his work on reconstructions (the hockey stick graph) that they and the Bush administration disputed. During the hearing Senator Jim Jeffords read out an email from Hans von Storch saying he had resigned as editor-in-chief of the journal that published the Soon and Baliunas paper, as the peer review had "failed to detect significant methodological flaws in the paper" and the critique by Mann and colleagues was valid.

In a continuation of these themes, Inhofe had a 20-page brochure published under the Seal of the United States Senate reiterating his "hoax" statement and comparing the Intergovernmental Panel on Climate Change (IPCC) to a "Soviet style trial". In a section headed "The IPCC Plays Hockey" he attacked what he called "Mann's flawed, limited research." The brochure restated themes from Inhofe's Senate speech, and in December 2003 he distributed copies of it in Milan at a meeting about the United Nations Framework Convention on Climate Change, where he met "green activists" with posters quoting him as saying that global warming "is the greatest hoax ever perpetrated on the American people". He signed a poster for them, and thanked them for quoting him correctly. In an October 2004 Senate speech he said, "Global warming is the greatest hoax ever perpetrated on the American people. It was true when I said it before, and it remains true today. Perhaps what has made this hoax so effective is that we hear over and over that the science is settled and there is a consensus that, unless we fundamentally change our way of life by limiting greenhouse gas emissions, we will cause catastrophic global warming. This is simply a false statement." In January 2005, Inhofe told Bloomberg News that global warming was "the second-largest hoax ever played on the American people, after the separation of church and state", and that carbon dioxide would not be restricted by the Clear Skies Act of 2003. In a Senate Floor "update", he extended his argument against Mann's work by extensively citing Michael Crichton's fictional thriller State of Fear, mistakenly describing Crichton as a "scientist". On August 28, 2005, at Inhofe's invitation, Crichton appeared as an expert witness at a hearing on climate change, disputing Mann's work.

In his 2006 book The Republican War on Science, Chris Mooney wrote that Inhofe "politicizes and misuses the science of climate change".

During the 2006 North American heat wave, Inhofe said that the environmentalist movement reminded him of "the Third Reich, the Big Lie": "You say something over and over and over and over again, and people will believe it, and that's their strategy." In a September 2006 Senate speech Inhofe argued that the threat of global warming was exaggerated by "the media, Hollywood elites and our pop culture". He said that in the 1960s the media had switched from warning of global warming to warning of global cooling and a coming ice age, then in the 1970s had returned to warming to promote "climate change fears". In February 2007 he told Fox News that mainstream science increasingly attributed climate change to natural causes, and only "those individuals on the far left, such as Hollywood liberals and the United Nations", disagreed.

In 2006, Inhofe and Kit Bond introduced Senate Amendment 4682, which would have modified oversight responsibility of the Army Corps of Engineers. The League of Conservation Voters, an environmentalist group, said analyses for corps projects "have been manipulated to favor large-scale projects that harm the environment." During the 109th Congress, Inhofe voted to increase offshore oil drilling, to include provisions for drilling in the Arctic National Wildlife Refuge in the House Budget Amendment, and to deny funding for both low-income energy assistance and environmental stewardship, citing heavy costs and unproven programs.

In May 2009, Inhofe gave support to the idea that black carbon is a significant contributor to global warming.

Inhofe received money from the fossil fuel industry. For example: "Exxon's beneficiaries in Congress include the Oklahoma senator Jim Inhofe, who called global warming a hoax, and who has received $20,500 since 2007, according to the Dirty Energy Money database maintained by Oil Change International."

==== Climatic Research Unit email controversy ====
On November 23, 2009, as the Climatic Research Unit email controversy emerged, Inhofe said the emails confirmed his view that scientists were "cooking the science". On December 7 on the CNN program The Situation Room, Inhofe said that the emails showed that the science behind climate change "has been pretty well debunked"; the fact checking organization PolitiFact concluded that Inhofe's statement was false. The same day, Inhofe said he would lead a three-man "truth squad" consisting of himself and fellow senators Roger Wicker and John Barrasso to the 2009 United Nations Climate Change Conference in Copenhagen. Inhofe was unable to secure meetings with any negotiators or delegations to the conference and only met with a small group of reporters. The minority group of the Senate Committee on Environment and Public Works prepared a report on "the CRU Controversy", published in February 2010, which listed as "Key Players" 17 scientists including Mann and Phil Jones. Inhofe said it showed that the controversy was "about unethical and potentially illegal behavior by some of the world's leading climate scientists." On May 26 Inhofe formally requested that the Inspector General of the United States Department of Commerce investigate how the National Oceanic and Atmospheric Administration (NOAA) had dealt with the emails, and whether the emails showed any wrongdoing; it found no major issues or inappropriate actions.

==== Global warming temperatures ====
In July 2010 Inhofe said, "I don't think that anyone disagrees with the fact that we actually are in a cold period that started about nine years ago. Now, that's not me talking, those are the scientists that say that." The Union of Concerned Scientists said that Inhofe was wrong, pointing to a NOAA report indicating that the summer of 2010 had so far been the hottest on record since 1880. Inhofe added, "People on the other side of this argument back in January, they said, 'Inhofe, it has nothing to do with today's or this month or next month. We're looking at a long period of time. We go into twenty year periods.'"

During a House committee hearing in 2011, Inhofe testified, "I have to admit—and, you know, confession is good for the soul ... I, too, once thought that catastrophic global warming was caused by anthropogenic gases—because everyone said it was." Under questioning from committee member Jay Inslee, Inhofe dismissed the notion that he was less knowledgeable than climate scientists, saying that he'd already given "five speeches on the science."

==== 2015: Chair of Environment and Public Works committee ====
On the floor of the U.S. Senate, Inhofe displayed a snowball—in winter—as evidence the globe was not warming—in a year that was found to be Earth's record warmest to date. The director of NASA's Goddard Institute for Space Studies distinguished local weather in a single location in a single week from global climate change.

On January 21, 2015, Inhofe returned to chairing the Senate Committee on Environment and Public Works as part of a new Republican majority in the Senate. In response to NOAA and NASA reports that 2014 had been the warmest year globally in the temperature record, he said, "we had the coldest in the western hemisphere in the same time frame", and attributed changes to a 30-year cycle, not human activities. In a debate on the same day about a bill for the Keystone XL pipeline, Inhofe endorsed an amendment proposed by Senator Sheldon Whitehouse, "Climate change is real and not a hoax", which passed 98–1. Inhofe clarified his view that "Climate is changing and climate has always changed and always will. There is archaeological evidence of that, there is biblical evidence of that, there is historical evidence of that", but added, "there are some people who are so arrogant to think they are so powerful they can change climate."

On February 26, 2015, Inhofe brought a snowball to the Senate floor and tossed it before delivering remarks in which he said that environmentalists keep talking about global warming even though it keeps getting cold.

==== Hydraulic fracturing ====
On March 19, 2015, Inhofe introduced S.828, "The Fracturing Regulations are Effective in State Hands (FRESH) Act." The bill would transfer regulatory power over hydraulic fracturing from the federal government to state governments. In his announcement of the bill, Inhofe said that hydraulic fracturing had never contaminated ground water in Oklahoma. U.S. senators from seven states (Arkansas, Idaho, Kentucky, Louisiana, South Dakota, and Texas) cosponsored the bill.

==== Paris Agreement ====
Inhofe co-authored and was one of 22 senators to sign a letter to President Donald Trump urging him to withdraw the United States from the Paris Agreement. According to OpenSecrets, Inhofe had received over $529,000 from the oil and gas industry since 2012.

=== Foreign policy ===
==== Israel Anti-Boycott Act ====
In October 2017, Inhofe co-sponsored the Israel Anti-Boycott Act (S. 720), which would have made it a federal crime for Americans to encourage or participate in boycotts against Israel and Israeli settlements in the occupied Palestinian territories if protesting actions by the Israeli government.

==== Western Sahara ====
Inhofe supported the Polisario Front and traveled to Algeria many times to meet with its leaders. He urged Morocco to hold a referendum on independence for Western Sahara. In 2017, Inhofe blocked the Trump administration's nomination of J. Peter Pham for Assistant Secretary of State for African Affairs, citing a disagreement over Western Sahara.

After the December 2020 Israel–Morocco normalization agreement, Inhofe sharply criticized the Trump administration for recognizing Morocco's claim over Western Sahara, calling the decision "shocking and deeply disappointing" and adding that he was "saddened that the rights of the Western Sahara people have been traded away".

==== War in Afghanistan ====
Inhofe opposed the 2021 withdrawal of U.S. troops from Afghanistan under President Biden, saying that Biden should maintain "a relatively small troop presence until the conditions outlined in the 2020 U.S.-Taliban Agreement are fully implemented."

=== Immigration ===
Inhofe wrote the Inhofe Amendment to the Comprehensive Immigration Reform Act of 2006, which was debated in Congress in May 2006. The amendment would make English the national language of the United States and require that new citizens take an English proficiency test. The amendment was passed on May 18, 2006, with 32 Democrats, one independent, and one Republican dissenting. The measure had 11 cosponsors, including one Democrat.

=== Social issues ===
==== Gun policy ====
In the aftermath of the 2017 Las Vegas shooting, Inhofe blamed the "culture of sanctuary cities" for the shootings.

==== LGBT rights ====
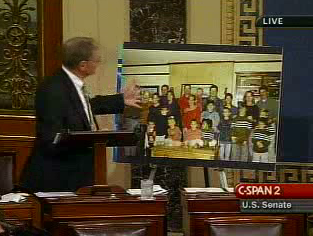
Inhofe pointing at a large photograph of his family, proclaiming none have been divorced or are LGBT

Inhofe was generally seen as overtly hostile by LGBT advocacy groups, earning a 0% in every one of his terms on the Human Rights Campaign's position scorecard. He was in favor of a constitutional amendment banning same-sex marriage, against adding sexual orientation to the definition of hate crimes, and voted against prohibiting job discrimination on the basis of sexual orientation. In 2008, Inhofe said his office "does not hire openly gay staffers due to the possibility of a conflict of agenda."

Inhofe campaigned for his Senate seat in 1994 using the phrase "God, guns, and gays." In 2008, his campaign was noted by the Associated Press for running an ad with "anti-gay overtones" featuring a wedding cake with two male figures on top, fading into his opponent's face.

In 1999, along with Republican colleagues Tim Hutchinson and Bob Smith, and Republican Senate Majority Leader Trent Lott, Inhofe stalled the nomination of James Hormel, a gay man, as US Ambassador to Luxembourg for over 20 months specifically because of Hormel's sexual orientation. President Bill Clinton eventually appointed him in a recess appointment, making him the United States' first openly gay ambassador in June 1999, and angering Inhofe, who held up seven more Clinton appointees in retaliation.

In 2015, Inhofe condemned the Supreme Court ruling in Obergefell v. Hodges, which held that same-sex marriage bans violate the Constitution.

==== Racial and gender civil rights ====
In 1995, Inhofe voted to ban affirmative action hiring with federal funds. In 1997, he voted to end special funding for minority- and women-owned businesses. The bill he voted for would have abolished a program that helps businesses owned by women and minorities to compete for federally funded transportation; it did not pass. The next year, Inhofe voted to repeal the Disadvantaged Business Enterprise Program, which is designed to "remedy ongoing discrimination and the continuing effects of past discrimination in federally-assisted highway, transit, airport, and highway safety financial assistance transportation contracting markets nationwide" by allocating 10% of highway funds to benefit the business enterprises of racial minorities and women.

Overall, in 2002, the American Civil Liberties Union (ACLU) rated Inhofe at 20%, indicating that he held an anti-racial civil rights record. Four years later, on December 31, 2006, the National Association for the Advancement of Colored People (NAACP) rated Inhofe at 7%, indicating that he held an anti-civil rights and anti-affirmative action record.

==== Privacy ====
In 2001, Inhofe voted to loosen restrictions on cell phone wiretapping. The bill, which passed, removed the requirement that a person or party implementing an order to wiretap a private citizen's cellphone must ascertain that the target of the surveillance is present in the house or using the phone that has been tapped.

==== Free speech and expression ====
In 1995, Inhofe co-sponsored a constitutional amendment to the U.S. Constitution that would give Congress and individual U.S. states the power to prohibit the physical desecration of the American flag. The bill's primary sponsor was Orrin Hatch (R-UT).

==== GI Bill reform ====
Inhofe, an initial sponsor of Senator Jim Webb's Post-9/11 Veterans Educational Assistance Act of 2008, subsequently withdrew support for this bill to support S. 2938, a competing bill that would have provided benefits beyond those offered in Webb's bill. But he voted to enact Webb's legislation in June 2008.

Inhofe agreed to support legislation allowing military mental health specialists to talk with veterans about private firearms in an effort to reduce suicides.

=== Economic issues ===
==== Aviation ====
Trained by the U.S. Navy, Inhofe was one of the few members of Congress holding a Commercial Airman certificate. In 1994, when he first ran for the U.S. Senate, he used his plane as a daily campaign vehicle to travel throughout Oklahoma and visit almost every town in the state. He was influential in Senate and Congressional debates involving aircraft regulation. In 2012, he authored the Pilot's Bill of Rights bill.

==== Taxpayer-funded travel ====
Inhofe said that he made over 140 trips to Africa over about 20 years and helped to get United States Africa Command established. He made multiple foreign trips, especially to Africa, on missions that he described as "a Jesus thing" and that were paid for by the U.S. government. He used these trips for activities on behalf of The Fellowship, a Christian organization. Inhofe said that his trips included some governmental work but also involved "the political philosophy of Jesus, something that had been put together by Doug Coe, the leader of The Fellowship ... It's all scripturally based." Inhofe used his access as a senator to pursue religious goals.

==== Federal disaster relief ====
Inhofe consistently voted against federal disaster relief, most notably in the case of relief for the 24 states affected by Hurricane Sandy, but argued for and voted for federal aid when natural disasters hit Oklahoma. In defense of his decision to vote against a relief fund for Sandy but not in Oklahoma after tornadoes ravaged it in May 2013, he claimed the situations were "totally different", in that the Sandy funding involved "Everybody getting in and exploiting the tragedy that took place. That won't happen in Oklahoma." Inhofe pointedly did not thank President Obama for his attention to the tragedy in his state, so as to not be compared to Chris Christie.

==== Sought federal environmental cleanup funds ====
Inhofe was instrumental in securing millions of dollars of federal funds to clean up contamination at a former mining hub in northeast Oklahoma after the affected site had spent decades on the Environmental Protection Agency Superfund list. He supported participation in the massive federal government buyout program for the Tar Creek Superfund site that purchased homes and businesses within a 40-square-mile (104-square-kilometer) region where for decades, children consistently tested positive for dangerous levels of lead in their blood.

==== Earmarks ====
In April 2021, Inhofe expressed support for bringing back earmarks to the United States Senate. The Tulsa World credited Inhofe for how he "relentlessly pursued" federal investment for highways, aviation, and military bases in the state.

=== Tribal sovereignty ===
In 2005, Inhofe included a midnight rider in that year's transportation bill that prevented federally recognized tribes in Oklahoma from administering Environmental Protection Agency regulations, a practice allowed by federal law in other states.

=== Presidential impeachments ===
On February 12, 1999, Inhofe was one of 50 senators to vote to convict and remove Bill Clinton from office. On February 5, 2020, he voted to acquit Donald Trump, and on February 13, 2021, he voted to acquit Trump for the second time.

=== 2016 presidential election ===
Early in the Republican Party presidential primaries in 2016, Inhofe endorsed John Kasich. During Donald Trump's presidency, he voted in line with Trump's position 94.2% of the time.

=== Purchase of Raytheon stock ===
In December 2018, Inhofe bought $50,000 to $100,000 worth of stock in Raytheon, a major defense contractor that has billions of dollars' worth of contracts with the Pentagon. The week before, he had successfully lobbied the Trump administration to increase military spending. Ethics watchdogs said the purchase raised conflict of interest concerns, and noted that members of Congress are not allowed to purchase stocks on the basis of information that is not publicly available. Inhofe sold the stock shortly after reporters asked him about the purchase. He said the purchase was made by a third-party adviser who manages Inhofe's investments on his behalf.

=== Judiciary ===
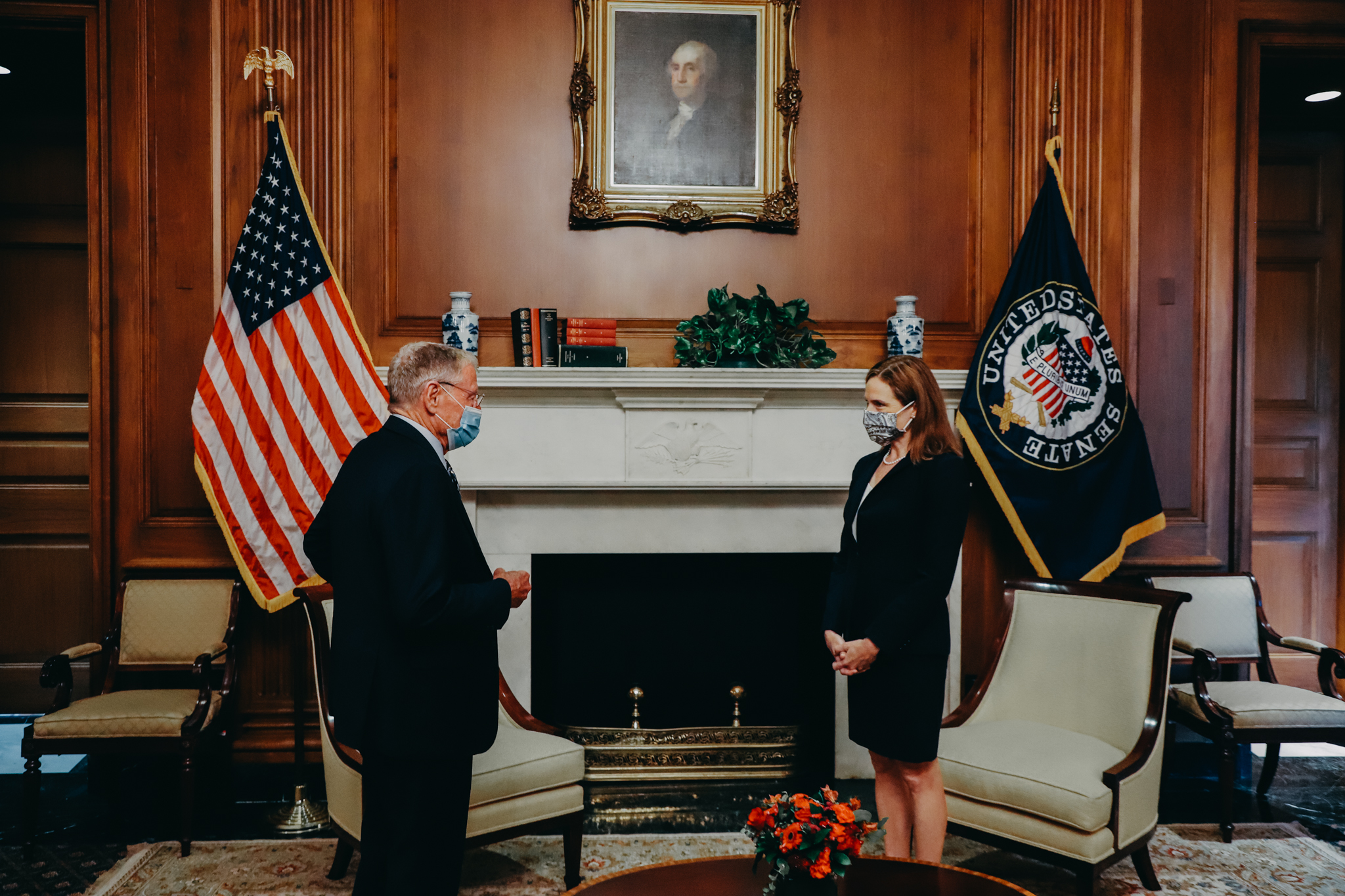
Inhofe meets with Supreme Court nominee Amy Coney Barrett.

In March 2016, around seven months before the next presidential election, Inhofe argued that the Senate should not consider Obama's Supreme Court nominee because "we must let the people decide the Supreme Court's future" via the presidential election. In September 2020, less than two months before the next presidential election, Inhofe supported an immediate vote on Trump's nominee to fill the Supreme Court vacancy caused by Justice Ruth Bader Ginsburg's death.

Inhofe also voted to confirm Neil Gorsuch and Brett Kavanaugh (Trump's other two Supreme Court nominations) and against Sonia Sotomayor and Elena Kagan (Obama's two Supreme Court nominations). All four were successful.

=== 2020 presidential election ===
Inhofe refused to support delaying the certification of the 2020 United States presidential election and said doing so would have violated his oath of office.

=== 2021 storming of the United States Capitol ===
On May 28, 2021, Inhofe abstained from voting on the creation of an independent commission to investigate the January 6 United States Capitol attack.

== Personal life ==
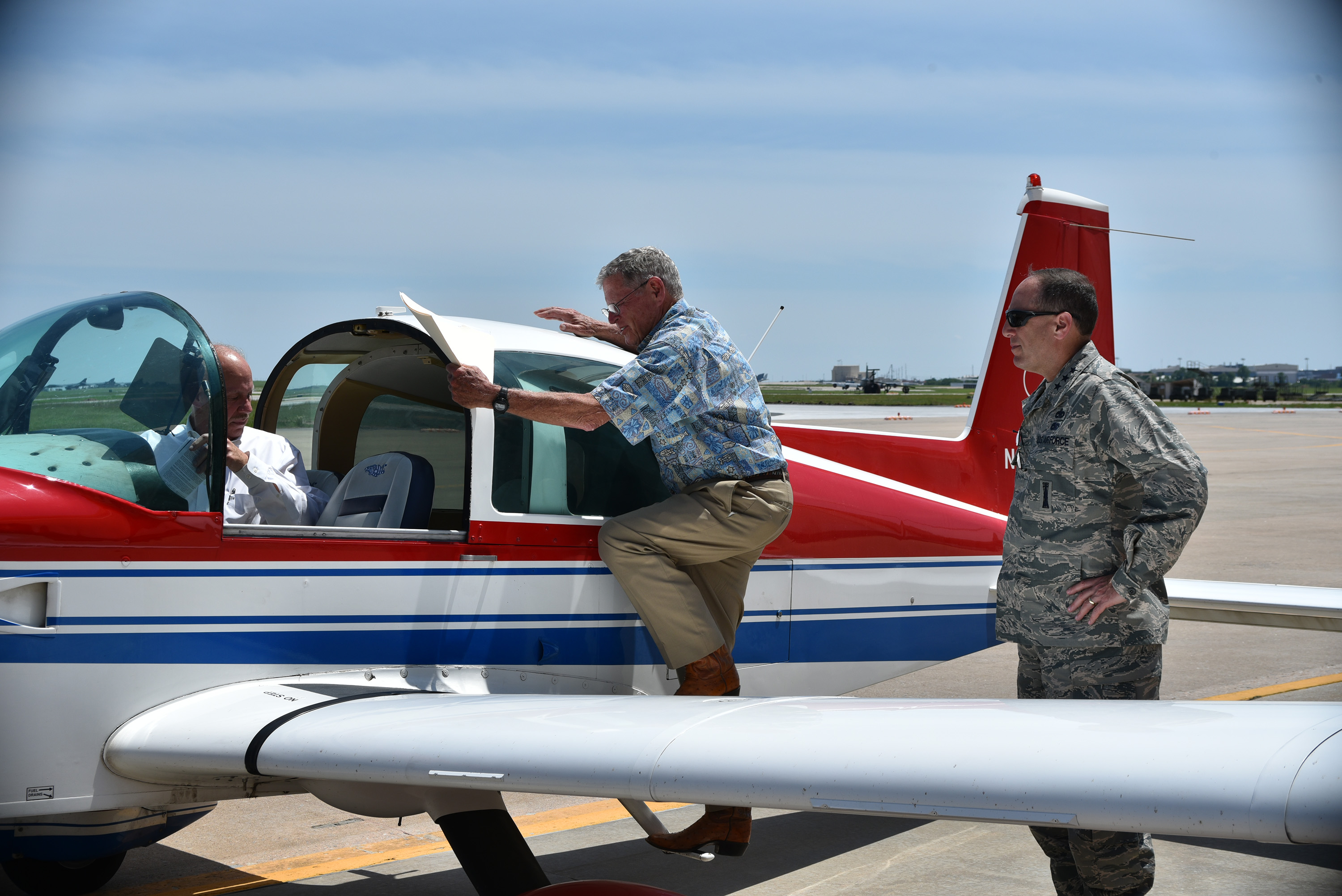
Inhofe boarding his airplane at Tinker Air Force Base in 2017

On December 19, 1959, Inhofe married Kay Kirkpatrick, with whom he had four children. His mother, Blanche M. Inhofe, died in 1975. On November 10, 2013, one of Inhofe's sons, Perry Inhofe, died in a plane crash in Owasso, Oklahoma, flying alone for the first time since training in a newly acquired Mitsubishi MU-2. Molly Rapert, an academic, is Inhofe's daughter.

Inhofe had his pilot's license since he was 28; he flew a Van's Aircraft RV-8. He attended the EAA AirVenture Oshkosh for 20 years; in 2021, he said, "I've slept in the same tent for 20 years. If you're not sleeping in a tent, it's not like being at Oshkosh." Inhofe had to emergency-land his plane multiple times throughout his career.

He was the first recipient of the U.S. Air Force Academy's Character and Leadership Award for his character and leadership in public service.

Toward the end of his life, Inhofe had symptoms of long COVID, which severely limited his capacity to do day-to-day activities.

Inhofe died from complications of a stroke at a hospital in Tulsa, on July 9, 2024, at the age of 89.

== Electoral history ==
=== Oklahoma House ===
1966 Oklahoma House of Representatives 71st district election
Primary election
Party	Candidate	Votes	%
Republican	Warren Green (incumbent)	1,396	54.57%
Republican	Jim Inhofe	1,162	45.43%
Total votes		2,558	100.00%

1966 Oklahoma House of Representatives 70th district special election
Primary election
Party	Candidate	Votes	%
Republican	Jim Inhofe	668	54.66%
Republican	Richard Hancock	544	44.52%
Republican	J. C. Gibson	10	0.82%
Total votes		1,222	100.00%
General election
Republican	Jim Inhofe	1,917	81.33%
Democratic	Patricia Anderson	440	18.67%
Total votes		2,357	100.00%

=== Oklahoma Senator ===
1968 Oklahoma Senate 35th district primary election
Primary election
Party	Candidate	Votes	%
Republican	Jim Inhofe	1,517	79.34%
Republican	Madison Bowers	395	20.66%
Total votes		1,912	100.00%

1972 Oklahoma Senate 35th district election (Note: The Republican Party primary was canceled in 1972 when no other candidate filed.)
Party	Candidate	Votes	%
Republican	Jim Inhofe (incumbent)	13,749	68.47%
Democratic	Happy Miles	6,330	31.53%
Total votes		20,079	100.00%

=== Oklahoma governor ===
1974 Oklahoma gubernatorial election
Primary election
Party	Candidate	Votes	%
Republican	Jim Inhofe	88,594	58.76
Republican	Denzil Garrison	62,188	41.24
Total votes		150,782	100.00
General election
Democratic	David Boren	514,389	63.91
Republican	Jim Inhofe	290,459	36.09
Total votes		804,848	100.00
Democratic hold			

=== 1976 U.S. House ===
1976 Oklahoma 1st Congressional District election
Primary election
Party	Candidate	Votes	%
Republican	Jim Inhofe	17,707	66.7%
Republican	Frank Keating	6,751	25.4%
Republican	Mary Warner	2,057	7.7%
Total votes		26,515	100.00
General election
Democratic	James R. Jones	100,945	53.9%
Republican	Jim Inhofe	84,374	45.1%
independent (politician)	W. D. Mackintosh	1,725	0.9%
Total votes		187,044	100.00
Democratic hold			

=== Tulsa mayor ===
1978 Tulsa Mayoral primary election
Primary election
Party	Candidate	Votes	%
Republican	Jim Inhofe	15,317	92.00%
Republican	Keith Robinson	910	5.47%
Republican	Paul Cull	422	2.53%
Total votes		16,649	100.00%

1978 Mayor of Tulsa election
Party	Candidate	Votes	%
Republican	Jim Inhofe	39,236	51.05%
Democratic	Rodger Randle	35,213	45.81%
independent (politician)	Jim Primdahl, Jr.	2,412	3.14%
Total votes		76,861	100.00%
Republican hold			

1980 Mayor of Tulsa election
Party	Candidate	Votes	%
Republican	Jim Inhofe (incumbent)	46,772	62.02%
Democratic	Richard Johnson	23,971	31.79%
independent (politician)	Jim Primdahl, Jr.	4,670	6.19%
Total votes		75,413	100.00%
Republican hold			

1982 Mayor of Tulsa election
Party	Candidate	Votes	%
Republican	Jim Inhofe (incumbent)	43,463	59.29%
Democratic	Tom Seymour	27,177	37.07%
independent (politician)	Robert T. Murphy	2,668	3.64%
Total votes		73,308	100.00%
Republican hold			

1984 Tulsa Mayoral Election Results
Candidates	Party	Votes	%
Terry Young	Democratic Party	48,450	50.49%
Jim Inhofe (incumbent)	Republican Party	47,526	49.51%
Total Votes		95,976	100%

=== U.S. Representative ===
1986 Oklahoma 1st Congressional District election
Primary election
Party	Candidate	Votes	%
Republican	Jim Inhofe	19,575	54.21
Republican	Bill Colvert	10,577	29.29
Republican	Joan Hastings	5,956	16.49
Total votes		36,108	100.00
General election
Republican	Jim Inhofe	78,919	54.79
Democratic	Gary D. Allison	61,663	42.81
independent (politician)	Carl E. McCullough, Jr.	3,455	2.40
Total votes		144,037	100.00
Republican gain from Democratic			

1988 Oklahoma 1st Congressional District election
Party	Candidate	Votes	%
Republican	Jim Inhofe (incumbent)	103,458	52.63
Democratic	Kurt Glassco	93,101	47.37
Total votes		196,559	100.00
Republican hold			

1990 Oklahoma 1st Congressional District election
Party	Candidate	Votes	%
Republican	Jim Inhofe (incumbent)	75,618	55.96
Democratic	Kurt Glassco	59,521	44.04
Total votes		135,139	100.00
Republican hold			

1992 Oklahoma 1st Congressional District election
Primary election
Party	Candidate	Votes	%
Republican	Jim Inhofe (incumbent)	36,354	67.71
Republican	Richard L. Bunn	17,339	32.29
Total votes		53,693	100.00
General election
Republican	Jim Inhofe (incumbent)	119,211	52.79
Democratic	John Selph	106,619	47.21
Total votes		225,830	100.00
Republican hold			

=== U.S. Senator ===
1994 United States Senate special election in Oklahoma
Primary election
Party	Candidate	Votes	%
Republican	Jim Inhofe	159,001	77.80
Republican	Tony Caldwell	45,359	22.20
Total votes		204,360	100.00
General election
Republican	Jim Inhofe	542,390	55.21
Democratic	Dave McCurdy	392,488	40.56
Independent	Danny Corn	47,552	4.84
Total votes		982,430	100.00
Republican gain from Democratic			

1996 United States Senate election in Oklahoma
Primary election
Party	Candidate	Votes	%
Republican	Jim Inhofe (incumbent)	116,241	75.34
Republican	Dan Lowe	38,044	24.66
Total votes		154,285	100.00
General election
Republican	Jim Inhofe (incumbent)	670,610	56.68
Democratic	Jim Boren	474,162	40.08
Independent	Bill Maguire	15,092	1.28
Libertarian	Agnes Marie Regier	14,595	1.23
Independent	Chris Nedbalek	8,691	0.73
Total votes		1,183,150	100.00
Republican hold			

2002 United States Senate election in Oklahoma
Party	Candidate	Votes	%
Republican	Jim Inhofe (incumbent)	583,579	57.30
Democratic	David Walters	369,789	36.31
Independent	James Germalic	65,056	6.39
Total votes		1,018,424	100.00
Republican hold			

2008 United States Senate election in Oklahoma
Primary election
Party	Candidate	Votes	%
Republican	Jim Inhofe (incumbent)	116,371	84.18
Republican	Evelyn Rogers	10,770	7.79
Republican	Ted Ryals	7,306	5.28
Republican	Dennis Lopez	3,800	2.75
Total votes		138,247	100.00
General election
Republican	Jim Inhofe (incumbent)	763,375	56.68
Democratic	Andrew Rice	527,736	39.18
Independent	Stephen P. Wallace	55,708	4.14
Total votes		1,346,819	100.00
Republican hold			

2014 United States Senate election in Oklahoma
Primary election
Party	Candidate	Votes	%
Republican	Jim Inhofe (incumbent)	231,291	87.68
Republican	Evelyn Rogers	11,960	4.53
Republican	Erick Paul Wyatt	11,713	4.44
Republican	Rob Moye	4,846	1.84
Republican	Jean McBride-Samuels	3,965	1.50
Total votes		263,775	100.00
General election
Republican	Jim Inhofe (incumbent)	558,166	68.01
Democratic	Matt Silverstein	234,307	28.55
Independent	Joan Farr	10,554	1.29
Independent	Ray Woods	9,913	1.21
Independent	Aaron DeLozier	7,793	0.95
Total votes		820,733	100.00
Republican hold			

2020 United States Senate election in Oklahoma
Primary election
Party	Candidate	Votes	%
Republican	Jim Inhofe (incumbent)	277,868	74.05
Republican	JJ Stitt	57,433	15.31
Republican	John Tompkins	23,563	6.28
Republican	Neil Mavis	16,363	4.36
Total votes		375,227	100.00
General election
Republican	Jim Inhofe (incumbent)	979,140	62.91
Democratic	Abby Broyles	509,763	32.75
Libertarian	Robert Murphy	34,435	2.21
Independent	Joan Farr	21,652	1.39
Independent	J.D. Nesbit	11,371	0.73
Total votes		1,556,361	100.00
Republican hold			

== See also ==
- Politics of Oklahoma
- List of United States senators from Oklahoma
- 2020 Congressional insider trading scandal

== Notes ==
Party political offices
Preceded by Dewey Bartlett	Republican nominee for Governor of Oklahoma; 1974	Succeeded by Ron Shotts
Preceded by Stephen Jones	Republican nominee for U.S. senator from Oklahoma (Class 2); 1994, 1996, 2002, 2008, 2014, 2020	Succeeded by Markwayne Mullin
Political offices
Preceded by Robert LaFortune	Mayor of Tulsa; 1978–1984	Succeeded by Terry Young
U.S. House of Representatives
Preceded by James R. Jones	Member of the U.S. House of Representatives from Oklahoma's 1st congressional district 1987–1994	Succeeded by Steve Largent
U.S. Senate
Preceded by David Boren	U.S. Senator (Class 2) from Oklahoma; 1994–2023; Served alongside: Don Nickles, Tom Coburn, James Lankford	Succeeded by Markwayne Mullin
Preceded by Jim Jeffords	Chair of the Senate Environment Committee; 2003–2007	Succeeded by Barbara Boxer
Preceded by Jim Jeffords	Ranking Member of the Senate Environment Committee; 2007–2013	Succeeded by David Vitter
Preceded by John McCain	Ranking Member of the Senate Armed Services Committee; 2013–2015	Succeeded by Jack Reed
Preceded by Barbara Boxer	Chair of the Senate Environment Committee; 2015–2017	Succeeded by John Barrasso
Preceded by John McCain	Chair of the Senate Armed Services Committee; 2018–2021; Acting: 2017–2018	Succeeded by Jack Reed
Preceded by Jack Reed	Ranking Member of the Senate Armed Services Committee; 2021–2023	Succeeded by Roger Wicker
