= American Gas Association =

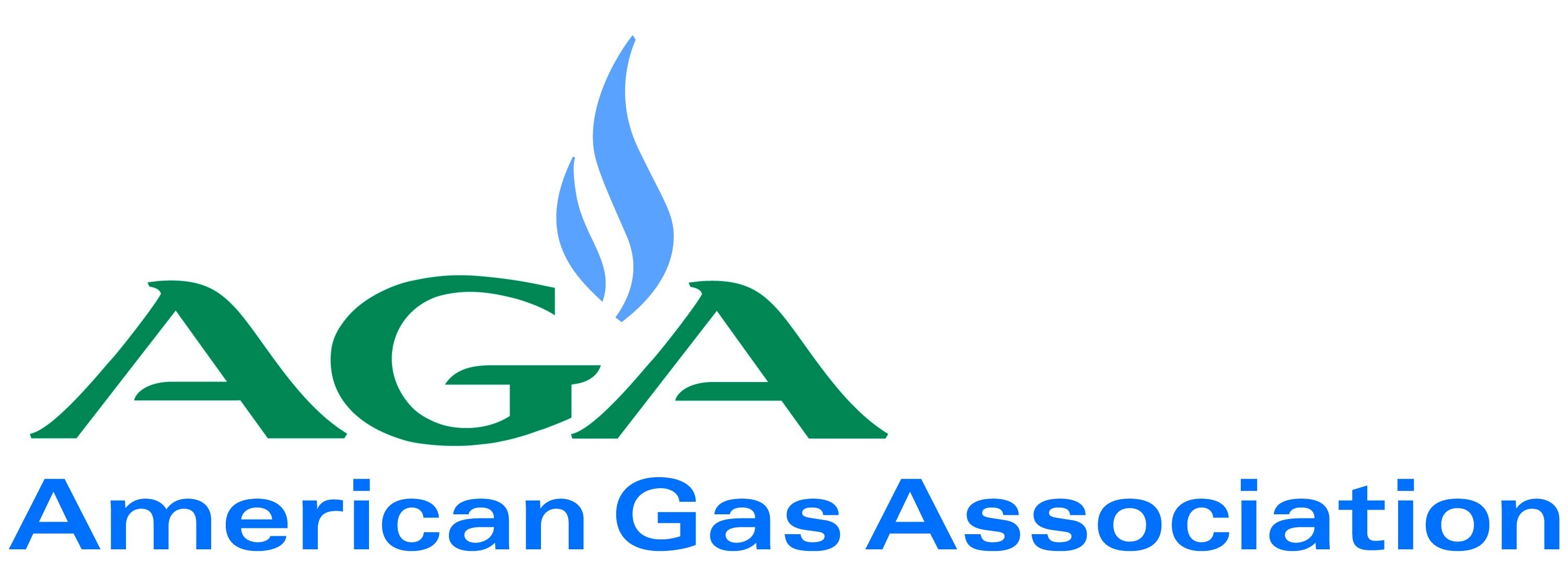
- Headquarters: Washington, D.C.
- Members: 200 energy companies
- President and CEO: Karen A. Harbert
- Chairman of the Board: Suzanne Sitherwood
- Website: http://www.aga.org/

The American Gas Association (AGA) is an American trade organization founded in 1918 representing and advocating on behalf of local energy companies delivering natural gas (also known as fossil gas or methane gas) throughout the United States.

In recent years, the AGA has become noted for its significant efforts to block action against climate change across various levels of the United States government.

Fossil gas is the second-most harmful greenhouse gas after carbon dioxide, absorbing significantly more energy even though it lingers in the atmosphere for a shorter amount of time. According to the International Energy Agency's latest global methane tracker report, methane emissions continue to increase globally.

== History ==
The American Gas Association was formed in June 1918 after the merger of the American Gas Institute and the National Commercial Gas Association, organizations serving the interests of companies that dealt in manufactured, as opposed to natural, gas. Manufactured gas was the dominant fuel in the early United States; during the 19th century natural gas supplanted it.

In January 1919, the AGA launched a publication for the natural gas industry providing information on trends, activities, and strategies on how to improve gas companies.

In 1925, the association formed laboratories in Cleveland, and five years later expanded to Los Angeles. These labs developed technology to improve gas appliances and equipment, making them more energy-efficient and consumer-friendly. The labs also did testing to ensure gas equipment conformed to national standards for safety, durability, and performance. The AGA ended its laboratory activities in 1997 and the new CSA International took its place. CSA today still runs a U.S. certification-type program from the AGA's original Cleveland laboratory.

In 1927, the AGA merged with the National Gas Association to help the AGA's member companies which depended on manufactured gas to make a smooth transition to natural gas.

In 1935, Congress passed the Public Utility Act and broke up the holding company that dominated much of the country's utility industry; this law continued to be enforced until 2005, when it was repealed by the Energy Policy Act of 2005.

During the 1930s, the AGA formed the National Advertising Committee to oversee a nationwide advertising program promoting gas for cooking, water heating, refrigeration, and house heating. Notably, one the employees Deke Houlgate coined the phrase "Now you're cooking with gas!", and made a deal with Bob Hope and other radio stars to subtly insert it in as an early form of product placement; the campaign that began c. 1940 was so successful the phrase eclipsed its original intent as advertising and entered the popular lexicon as an idiom with the figurative meaning of functioning particularly effectively or achieving something substantial.

Karen Alderman Harbert became the association's president and CEO on April 1, 2019. She is a former federal government official and leader of energy industry organizations. She replaces Dave McCurdy who retired from the association on February 28, 2019.

In 2023, Eversource, an investor owned utility in New England, left the American Gas Association in order to "“redirect costs to more targeted associations and memberships with a focus on decarbonization to support our company-wide operations."

In 2024, a non-profit campaign entitled Gas Leaks Project was launched, which targeted the AGA and its lobbying against efforts to address climate change. The campaign aimed to convince AGA members to leave the association.

== Lobbying work ==
=== History and key spokespeople ===
Since 1990, possibly earlier, the organization has registered as a lobbyist to discuss issues pertaining to the natural gas industry with elected officials of the government. AGA President and CEO Karen Harbert and independent lobbyist George Lowe are considered significant government lobbyists in Washington DC.In 2014, Lowe was named as vice president of federal affairs for the organization and continues to hold this position in 2026. He previously served as a senior staff member for two Alaskan senators, Lisa Murkowski and Ted Stevens.

=== Lobbying Themes ===
==== Anti-electrification campaigns & gas ban preemption laws ====
The AGA has a long record of making false claims about the economic and public health benefits of gas use, with Grist reporting in October 2023 on how AGA has been downplaying the risks of gas use since at least 1970s. The industry group continues to leverage these claims in its strategic advocacy to prolong the use of fossil gas in the buildings sector.

At the state level, this pro-gas promotion has translated into activities to block local governments from restricting gas use in new construction (i.e., state-level gas ban preemption laws or fuel choice laws). According to an investigation by National Public Radio, "state laws became a priority for the gas association at least as far back as December 2019." As of 2026, over half of US states have passed bills ensuring that gas service cannot be banned from new construction.

AGA built on this by creating a social media campaign called "Cooking With Gas" featuring online influencer Amber Kelly, among others, with the goal of promoting false claims about fossil gas to young consumers.

The American Gas Association has also worked with the (FERC) Federal Energy Regulatory Commission to improve market transparency reporting. In 2004, the FERC issued a policy statement on price reporting and price index publishing. The following year, the Energy Policy Act of 2005 included market behavior and provisions and penalties, and FERC issued a rule prohibiting market manipulation.

The industry association continues to strategically oppose policy measures to address climate change, with CEO Karen Harbert frequently making public statements calling for the buildout of new fossil gas infrastructure. This advocacy has included public messaging, legislative endorsements, and legal engagements on energy policy measures, such as its ongoing action against the Biden administration's energy conservation standards for furnaces and water heaters.

During the second presidency of Donald Trump, the AGA was instrumental in efforts to dismantle EPA regulations against methane emissions.

It is estimated that the AGA spends between $30 million to $60 million annually on lobbying and political operations.

== Natural Gas Sustainability Initiative (NGSI) ==
The AGA co-launched what is known as the Natural Gas Sustainability Initiative (NGSI) with the investor-owned utility company trade association Edison Electric Institute (EEI). The two groups launched the pilot for the NGSI in 2017, and then released "version two" in August 2019. The NGSI is an agreement by electric utilities and natural gas companies to use a special template to report efforts in the areas of environmental, social, governance, and sustainability ("ESG/sustainability") to the financial sector. Both the AGA and EEI expect that most of their member companies will be using the NGSI reporting template by the end of 2019. The reporting template provides both quantitative data and qualitative information.

== Issues ==
The American Gas Association has faced financial issues regarding the taxation of dividends. In 2002, The American Gas Association's main priority was to eliminate double taxation on dividends. AGA analyst Charlie Fritts voiced his opinions about the opposition of double taxation due to the possible effects it can have on gas companies. The United States tax code has also been seen as problematic by the American Gas Association, as according to the AGA it creates an uneven playing field for companies that pay dividends and gas companies that maintain most of their earnings. Fritts had also viewed double taxation as problematic because the gas utility industry is expected to raise approximately $100 billion in capital in the following 20 years after 2002, which can be hampered if profits (dividends) from investments are highly taxed. The main goal was to develop a natural gas infrastructure in the United States. Fritts also stated that "natural gas demand is expected to grow 50 percent between 2003 until 2020; utilities must raise substantial capital to build 255,000 miles of natural gas distribution pipe to meet that demand."

The United States has enough domestic natural gas to meet demands for several industries for several decades into the future, according to the Potential Gas Committee (PGC). The committee is a nonprofit industry-funded organization. "Specifically, the United States possesses a technically recoverable natural gas resource base of 2,817 trillion cubic feet (TCF) yet to be discovered, said Alexei V. Milkov, a professor and director of the PGC at the Colorado School of Mines, which provides guidance and technical assistance to the PGC." Milkov Later clarified that "that's jargon for 'the U.S. has abundant resources of natural gas.’"

At an Edison Electric Institute (EEI) meeting of U.S. investor-owned utility company executives in November 2019, the American Gas Association and EEI announced a new initiative for energy companies to measure and disclose methane emissions from their natural gas suppliers.
