= Beauchamp Selman =

American politician

L. Beauchamp "Beau" Selman

Member of the Oklahoma Senate from the 35th district
- In office 1965–1968
- Preceded by: Bob A. Trent
- Succeeded by: Jim Inhofe

Personal details
- Died: April 1999
- Party: Democratic

L. Beauchamp "Beau" Selman was an American politician who served in the Oklahoma Senate representing the 35th district from 1965 to 1968.

== Early life and education ==
Beau Selman was a native of Walters, Oklahoma. He briefly attended Cameron University for a year before transferring to the University of Oklahoma where he graduated in 1936.

His brother, James Clarke Selman (1917-2018), served in the United States Air Force for nearly 30 years, from 1939 to 1968, serving during World War II.

== Career ==
Selman served as an Oklahoma state senator between 1965 and 1968. During his tenure he principal author of the bills that created Tulsa Junior College. He did not seek re-election in 1968 and was succeeded in office by Jim Inhofe. He also worked for the Oklahoma Department of Wildlife Conservation.

He was honored as a Good Steward for Wildlife in February, 1999. He was described as having been, "active in wildlife conservation for many years".

== Death ==
He died at the age of 84 in April 1999.
