= Terry Young (American politician) =

American politician

33rd Mayor of Tulsa
- In office 1984–1986
- Preceded by: Jim Inhofe
- Succeeded by: Dick Crawford

Personal details
- Born: Tulsa, Oklahoma
- Party: Democratic
- Spouse: Carol Young

Terry Young was mayor of Tulsa, Oklahoma from 1984 to 1986.

== Early life ==
Young graduated Edison High School in 1966 and received an associate degree from Tulsa Community College.

=== Tulsa County Commissioner ===
Young was appointed as county commissioner of Tulsa County's second district in 1976 and was later elected to a full term that year. He was reelected in 1978 and 1982.

==== Mayor of Tulsa ====
In 1984, Young was elected Mayor of Tulsa by a 924 vote margin against incumbent mayor Jim Inhofe. He served one term as mayor between 1984 and 1986. He negotiated the land exchange with the Department of Housing and Urban Development to build OSU-Tulsa and allocated $10 million to expand the Gilcrease Museum.

As mayor, he created a flood control program in response to the 1984 flood. The program was controversial because of its home buyout element.

== Electoral history ==
1976 Special Tulsa County District 2 Commissioner Democratic Primary Election Results
Candidates	Party	Votes	%
Terry Young	Democratic Party	2,688	45.29%
William L. "Bill" Gay	Democratic Party	1,450	24.43%
Robert A. Morrison	Democratic Party	793	13.36%
William H. Oakley	Democratic Party	753	12.68%
Ralph L. Phillips	Democratic Party	251	4.24%
Total Votes		5,935	100%

1976 Special Tulsa County District 2 Commissioner General Election Results
Candidates	Party	Votes	%
Terry Young	Democratic Party	29,576	51.60%
Frank A. Wallace	Republican Party	27,739	48.40%
Total Votes		57,315	100%

1978 Tulsa County District 2 Commissioner Democratic Primary Election Results
Candidates	Party	Votes	%
Terry Young	Democratic Party	12,010	80.22%
Bert Elam	Democratic Party	2,960	19.78%
Total Votes		14,970	100%

1978 Tulsa County District 2 Commissioner General Election Results
Candidates	Party	Votes	%
Terry Young	Democratic Party	20,099	56.42%
Robert L. Triplett Jr.	Republican Party	15,528	43.58
Total Votes		35,627	100%

1982 Tulsa County District 2 Commissioner General Election Results
Candidates	party	Votes	%
Terry Young	Democratic Party	29,141	61.57%
Bob Bass	Republican Party	18,190	38.43%
Total Votes		47,331	100%

1984 Tulsa Mayoral Democratic Primary Election Results
Candidates	Party	Votes	%
Terry Young	Democratic Party	17,772	74.37%
Eric Rollerson	Democratic Party	3,518	14.72%
R. C. Romero	Democratic Party	2,608	10.91%
Total Votes		23,898	100%%

1984 Tulsa Mayoral Election Results
Candidates	Party	Votes	%
Terry Young	Democratic Party	48,450	50.49%
Jim Inhofe	Republican Party	47,526	49.51%
Total Votes		95,976	100%

1986 Tulsa Mayoral Democratic Primary Election Results
Candidates	Party	Votes	%
Tom Quinn	Democratic Party	11,434	53.46%
Terry Young	Democratic Party	9,955	46.54%
Total Votes		21,389	100%%

Preceded by Jim Inhofe	33rd Mayor of Tulsa; 1984–1986	Succeeded by Dick Crawford
