= 1974 Oklahoma gubernatorial election =

- November 5, 1974
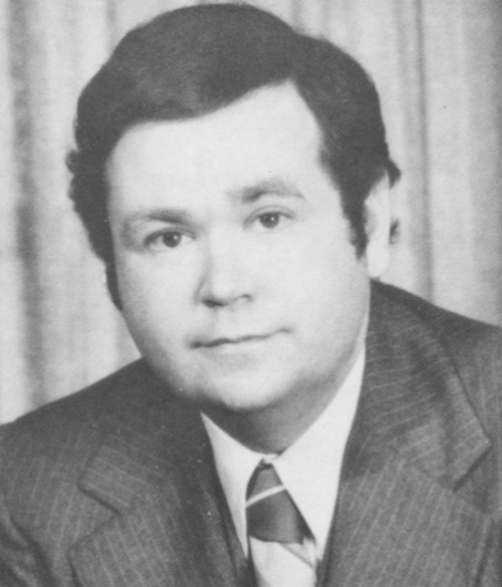

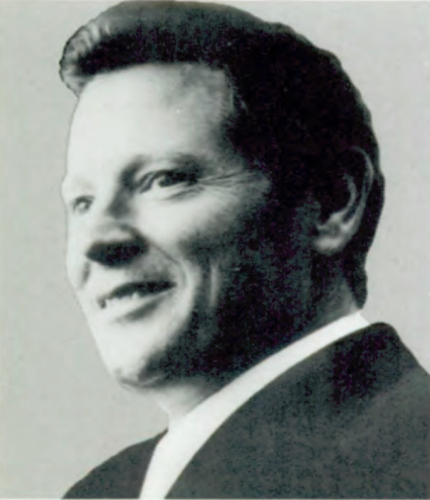
Nominee	David Boren	Jim Inhofe
Party	Democratic	Republican
Popular vote	514,389	290,459
Percentage	63.91%	36.09%
- County results Boren: 50–60% 60–70% 70–80% 80–90% >90% Inhofe: 50–60%
Governor before election
David Hall
Democratic
Elected Governor
David Boren
Democratic

The 1974 Oklahoma gubernatorial election was held on November 5, 1974, to elect the governor of Oklahoma. Democrat David Boren defeated Clem McSpadden in a run-off to claim his party's nomination after embattled incumbent David Hall was eliminated in the initial primary. Boren won the general election handily over Republican Jim Inhofe, who later won a 1994 U.S. Senate special election triggered by Boren's impending resignation to become the University of Oklahoma's president.

Inhofe only carried Major, Nowata, Tulsa, and Washington counties.

== Primary election ==
Primary elections were held on August 27, 1974, with runoffs occurring on September 17, 1974.

=== Democratic party ===
Incumbent governor David Hall lost renomination by coming in third place in the regular primary.

==== Candidates ====
- David Lyle Boren, member of Oklahoma House of Representatives
- David Hall, incumbent governor
- Clem Rogers McSpadden, U.S. representative from Oklahoma's 2nd district

==== Results ====
Democratic primary results
Party	Candidate	Votes	%
Democratic	Clem Rogers McSpadden	238,534	37.67%
Democratic	David Lyle Boren	225,321	35.59%
Democratic	David Hall (incumbent)	169,290	26.74%
Total votes		633,145	100.00%

Democratic primary runoff results
Party	Candidate	Votes	%
Democratic	David Lyle Boren	286,171	53.51%
Democratic	Clem Rogers McSpadden	248,623	46.49%
Total votes		534,794	100.00%

=== Republican party ===
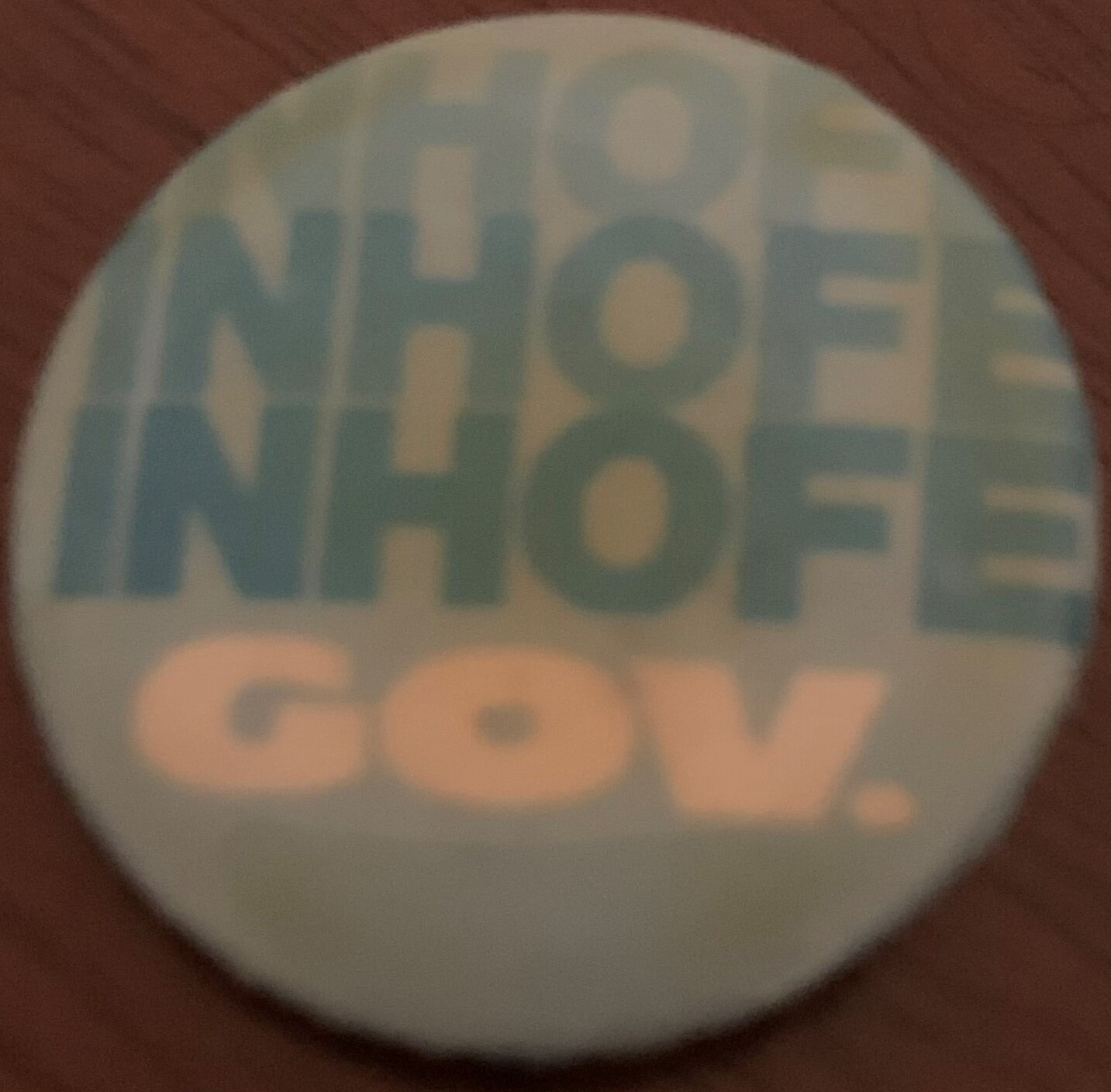
A campaign button for Inhofe's campaign

==== Candidates ====
- Denzil Garrison, member of Oklahoma Senate
- Jim Inhofe, member of Oklahoma Senate

==== Results ====
Republican primary results
Party	Candidate	Votes	%
Republican	Jim Inhofe	88,594	58.76%
Republican	Denzil Garrison	62,188	41.24%
Total votes		150,782	100.00%

== General election ==
=== Results ===
1974 Oklahoma gubernatorial election
Party	Candidate	Votes	%	±%
Democratic	David Lyle Boren	514,389	63.91%	+15.49%
Republican	Jim Inhofe	290,459	36.09%	−12.02%
Total votes		804,848	100.00%	
Majority		223,940	27.82%	
Democratic hold		Swing	+27.51%	

=== Results by county ===
County	David Boren Democratic		Jim Inhofe Republican		Margin		Total votes cast
County	#	%	#	%	#	%	Total votes cast
Adair	3,306	60.43%	2,165	39.57%	1,141	20.86%	5,471
Alfalfa	1,761	50.90%	1,699	49.10%	62	1.79%	3,460
Atoka	3,207	84.71%	579	15.29%	2,628	69.41%	3,786
Beaver	1,530	63.12%	894	36.88%	636	26.24%	2,424
Beckham	4,131	76.60%	1,262	23.40%	2,869	53.20%	5,393
Blaine	2,548	55.50%	2,043	44.50%	505	11.00%	4,591
Bryan	6,965	88.34%	919	11.66%	6,046	76.69%	7,884
Caddo	6,488	72.54%	2,456	27.46%	4,032	45.08%	8,944
Canadian	7,996	60.40%	5,243	39.60%	2,753	20.79%	13,239
Carter	8,071	79.82%	2,041	20.18%	6,030	59.63%	10,112
Cherokee	5,935	67.22%	2,894	32.78%	3,041	34.44%	8,829
Choctaw	3,544	89.07%	435	10.93%	3,109	78.14%	3,979
Cimarron	946	65.24%	504	34.76%	442	30.48%	1,450
Cleveland	18,627	66.35%	9,447	33.65%	9,180	32.70%	28,074
Coal	1,582	84.42%	292	15.58%	1,290	68.84%	1,874
Comanche	13,913	74.79%	4,689	25.21%	9,224	49.59%	18,602
Cotton	1,730	80.69%	414	19.31%	1,316	61.38%	2,144
Craig	3,228	60.84%	2,078	39.16%	1,150	21.67%	5,306
Creek	8,028	60.09%	5,332	39.91%	2,696	20.18%	13,360
Custer	5,014	67.88%	2,373	32.12%	2,641	35.75%	7,387
Delaware	3,865	62.10%	2,359	37.90%	1,506	24.20%	6,224
Dewey	1,564	62.06%	956	37.94%	608	24.13%	2,520
Ellis	1,373	57.07%	1,033	42.93%	340	14.13%	2,406
Garfield	9,937	52.68%	8,926	47.32%	1,011	5.36%	18,863
Garvin	6,752	76.31%	2,096	23.69%	4,656	52.62%	8,848
Grady	6,647	72.36%	2,539	27.64%	4,108	44.72%	9,186
Grant	1,863	59.11%	1,289	40.89%	574	18.21%	3,152
Greer	1,978	79.22%	519	20.78%	1,459	58.43%	2,497
Harmon	1,318	92.04%	114	7.96%	1,204	84.08%	1,432
Harper	1,064	53.41%	928	46.59%	136	6.83%	1,992
Haskell	2,977	79.49%	768	20.51%	2,209	58.99%	3,745
Hughes	3,856	82.94%	793	17.06%	3,063	65.89%	4,649
Jackson	4,913	84.90%	874	15.10%	4,039	69.79%	5,787
Jefferson	1,743	84.57%	318	15.43%	1,425	69.14%	2,061
Johnston	2,246	85.63%	377	14.37%	1,869	71.25%	2,623
Kay	9,877	55.74%	7,844	44.26%	2,033	11.47%	17,721
Kingfisher	2,752	52.25%	2,515	47.75%	237	4.50%	5,267
Kiowa	3,367	78.96%	897	21.04%	2,470	57.93%	4,264
Latimer	2,562	82.89%	529	17.11%	2,033	65.77%	3,091
Le Flore	7,179	79.40%	1,862	20.60%	5,317	58.81%	9,041
Lincoln	5,298	66.57%	2,660	33.43%	2,638	33.15%	7,958
Logan	4,601	61.35%	2,898	38.65%	1,703	22.71%	7,499
Love	1,461	89.19%	177	10.81%	1,284	78.39%	1,638
Major	1,517	46.21%	1,766	53.79%	-249	-7.58%	3,283
Marshall	2,694	89.98%	300	10.02%	2,394	79.96%	2,994
Mayes	5,099	59.02%	3,541	40.98%	1,558	18.03%	8,640
McClain	3,465	72.28%	1,329	27.72%	2,136	44.56%	4,794
McCurtain	5,899	90.38%	628	9.62%	5,271	80.76%	6,527
McIntosh	3,607	74.90%	1,209	25.10%	2,398	49.79%	4,816
Murray	2,903	81.64%	653	18.36%	2,250	63.27%	3,556
Muskogee	13,587	72.70%	5,101	27.30%	8,486	45.41%	18,688
Noble	2,455	54.40%	2,058	45.60%	397	8.80%	4,513
Nowata	1,830	49.00%	1,905	51.00%	-75	-2.01%	3,735
Okfuskee	2,763	73.72%	985	26.28%	1,778	47.44%	3,748
Oklahoma	85,625	59.71%	57,770	40.29%	27,855	19.43%	143,395
Okmulgee	8,131	71.35%	3,265	28.65%	4,866	42.70%	11,396
Osage	6,240	60.42%	4,087	39.58%	2,153	20.85%	10,327
Ottawa	6,328	72.74%	2,371	27.26%	3,957	45.49%	8,699
Pawnee	2,547	52.08%	2,344	47.92%	203	4.15%	4,891
Payne	9,992	57.73%	7,317	42.27%	2,675	15.45%	17,309
Pittsburg	9,823	82.73%	2,050	17.27%	7,773	65.47%	11,873
Pontotoc	8,613	79.29%	2,250	20.71%	6,363	58.57%	10,863
Pottawatomie	11,261	75.45%	3,665	24.55%	7,596	50.89%	14,926
Pushmataha	2,824	84.70%	510	15.30%	2,314	69.41%	3,334
Roger Mills	1,267	68.30%	588	31.70%	679	36.60%	1,855
Rogers	5,535	52.01%	5,108	47.99%	427	4.01%	10,643
Seminole	8,236	88.78%	1,041	11.22%	7,195	77.56%	9,277
Sequoyah	5,881	76.35%	1,822	23.65%	4,059	52.69%	7,703
Stephens	9,161	80.06%	2,281	19.94%	6,880	60.13%	11,442
Texas	3,327	74.35%	1,148	25.65%	2,179	48.69%	4,475
Tillman	3,045	86.07%	493	13.93%	2,552	72.13%	3,538
Tulsa	60,697	48.48%	64,492	51.52%	-3,795	-3.03%	125,189
Wagoner	4,975	61.22%	3,152	38.78%	1,823	22.43%	8,127
Washington	8,210	48.49%	8,720	51.51%	-510	-3.01%	16,930
Washita	3,143	73.31%	1,144	26.69%	1,999	46.63%	4,287
Woods	2,794	57.25%	2,086	42.75%	708	14.51%	4,880
Woodward	3,172	58.50%	2,250	41.50%	922	17.00%	5,422
Totals	514,389	63.91%	290,459	36.09%	223,930	27.82%	804,848

==== Counties that flipped from Republican to Democratic ====
- Alfalfa
- Blaine
- Canadian
- Cleveland
- Custer
- Delaware
- Ellis
- Garfield
- Grant
- Harper
- Kay
- Kingfisher
- Lincoln
- Logan
- Noble
- Oklahoma
- Pawnee
- Payne
- Woods
- Woodward
