= Inhofe Amendment =

USA Legislative Amendment

The Inhofe Amendment was an amendment to the Comprehensive Immigration Reform Act of 2006, a United States Senate bill that would have changed current immigration law allowing fewer immigrants into the United States. The amendment was passed by the Senate on May 18, 2006 by a vote of 62–35. The bill did not pass the United States House of Representatives.

According to the amendment, written by Sen. James M. Inhofe (R-Okla.), the federal government will no longer provide multilingual communications and services, except for those already guaranteed by law. It would also make English the "national language" and require new citizens to pass a test of their English proficiency and knowledge of American history.

Key portion of the final amendment, section 770 of the bill (titled "PRESERVING AND ENHANCING THE ROLE OF THE ENGLISH LANGUAGE"):

The Government of the United States shall preserve and enhance the role of English as the national language of the United States of America. Unless otherwise authorized or provided by law, no person has a right, entitlement, or claim to have the Government of the United States or any of its officials or representatives act, communicate, perform or provide services, or provide materials in any language other than English. If exceptions are made, that does not create a legal entitlement to additional services in that language or any language other than English. If any forms are issued by the Federal Government in a language other than English (or such forms are completed in a language other than English), the English language version of the form is the sole authority for all legal purposes.

Shortly after the approval of the Inhofe amendment, the Senate voted for another bill by Sen. Ken Salazar (D-Colo.), according to which English is the "common unifying language of the United States," but mandated that nothing in that declaration "shall diminish or expand any existing rights" regarding multilingual services. It passed 58–39.

== Supporting reasons for the amendment ==
Inhofe proposed his amendment, saying that there should not be a right to demand that government business be conducted in any other language, that there is a unifying effect with a common language, and indicating the importance of knowing English to get ahead in America.

== Criticism of the amendment ==
Senator Harry Reid, Democrat from Nevada, called the amendment "racist" in a speech before the Senate, arguing that it targeted speakers of Spanish.

== Votes of Senators on Amendment ==
Yeas (63)	Nays (34)	Abstentions (3)
Alexander (R-TN); Allard (R-CO); Allen (R-VA); Baucus (D-MT); Bennett (R-UT); Bond (R-MO); Brownback (R-KS); Burns (R-MT); Burr (R-NC); Byrd (D-WV); Carper (D-DE); Chafee (R-RI); Chambliss (R-GA); Coburn (R-OK); Cochran (R-MS); Coleman (R-MN); Collins (R-ME); Conrad (D-ND); Cornyn (R-TX); Craig (R-ID); Crapo (R-ID); DeMint (R-SC); DeWine (R-OH); Dole (R-NC); Dorgan (D-ND); Ensign (R-NV); Enzi (R-WY); Frist (R-TN); Graham (R-SC); Grassley (R-IA); Gregg (R-NH); Hagel (R-NE); Hatch (R-UT); Hutchison (R-TX); Inhofe (R-OK); Isakson (R-GA); Johnson (D-SD); Kyl (R-AZ); Landrieu (D-LA); Lincoln (D-AR); Lott (R-MS); Lugar (R-IN); McCain (R-AZ); McConnell (R-KY); Murkowski (R-AK); Nelson (D-FL); Nelson (D-NE); Pryor (D-AR); Roberts (R-KS); Sessions (R-AL); Shelby (R-AL); Smith (R-OR); Snowe (R-ME); Specter (R-PA); Stevens (R-AK); Sununu (R-NH); Talent (R-MO); Thomas (R-WY); Thune (R-SD); Vitter (R-LA); Voinovich (R-OH); Warner (R-VA); Wyden (D-OR)	Akaka (D-HI); Bayh (D-IN); Biden (D-DE); Bingaman (D-NM); Boxer (D-CA); Cantwell (D-WA); Casey (D-PA); Clinton (D-NY); Dayton (D-MN); Dodd (D-CT); Domenici (R-NM); Durbin (D-IL); Feingold (D-WI); Feinstein (D-CA); Harkin (D-IA); Inouye (D-HI); Jeffords (I-VT); Kennedy (D-MA); Kerry (D-MA); Kohl (D-WI); Lautenberg (D-NJ); Leahy (D-VT); Levin (D-MI); Lieberman (D-CT); Menendez (D-NJ); Mikulski (D-MD); Murray (D-WA); Obama (D-IL); Reed (D-RI); Reid (D-NV); Salazar (D-CO); Sarbanes (D-MD); Schumer (D-NY); Stabenow (D-MI)	Bunning (R-KY); Martinez (R-FL); Rockefeller (D-WV)

== See also ==
- English-only movement
- National language
- Languages in the United States
- United States immigration debate
- Illegal immigration
