= Molly Rapert =

American marketing academic

- Born: Molly Inhofe; October 6, 1963 (age 62); Tulsa, Oklahoma, U.S.
- Education: University of Arkansas (BS, MBA); University of Memphis (PhD)
- Occupation: Associate Professor of Marketing at the Sam M. Walton College of Business
- Employer: University of Arkansas
- Known for: Teaching and Marketing Research
- Father: Jim Inhofe
- Relatives: Glade Kirkpatrick (grandfather)

Molly Inhofe Rapert (born October 6, 1963) is an American associate professor of marketing at the University of Arkansas Sam M. Walton College of Business. She is also the Director for the Center for Teaching Effectiveness. She is the daughter of Jim Inhofe, former U.S. Senator from Oklahoma.

== Education ==
Rapert graduated from the University of Arkansas with a BSBA and an MBA. She then went to the University of Memphis and earned a Ph.D. in Marketing.

== Career ==
Rapert began her career at the university in 1991 as an assistant professor, becoming an associate professor in 1998. In 2010, she was named by the Marketing Management Association as the top marketing professor in the nation.
