= Dave McCurdy =

American politician

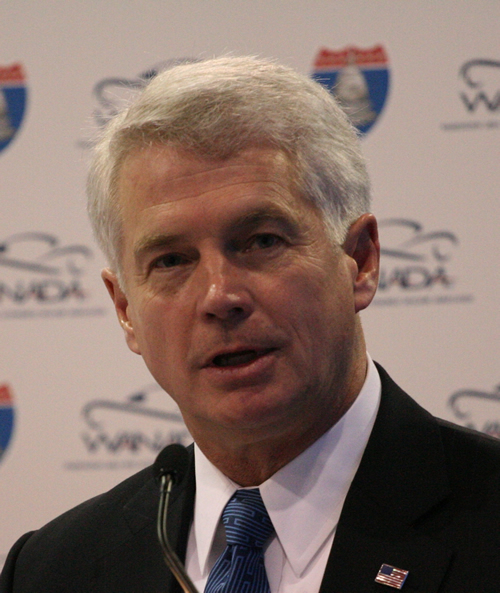

Chair of the House Intelligence Committee
- In office January 3, 1991 – January 3, 1993
- Preceded by: Anthony Beilenson
- Succeeded by: Dan Glickman

Member of the U.S. House of Representatives from Oklahoma's 4th district
- In office January 3, 1981 – January 3, 1995
- Preceded by: Tom Steed
- Succeeded by: J. C. Watts

Personal details
- Born: David Keith McCurdy; March 30, 1950 (age 76) Canadian, Texas, U.S.
- Party: Democratic
- Spouse: Pam McCurdy
- Children: 3
- Education: University of Oklahoma (BA, JD); University of Edinburgh

Military service
- Allegiance: United States
- Branch/service: United States Air Force
- Rank: Major
- Unit: Air Force Reserve Command

David Keith McCurdy (born March 30, 1950) is an American lobbyist, lawyer, and former politician who was the Democratic U.S. representative from Oklahoma's 4th congressional district, in office from 1981 to 1995. Described as a moderate or conservative Democrat, McCurdy was a chair of the centrist Democratic Leadership Council. In 1994, he ran for the U.S. Senate, but lost to fellow Representative Jim Inhofe.

After leaving Congress, McCurdy became a lobbyist. He is a former president of the American Gas Association.

== Early life and education ==
McCurdy was born in the city of Canadian, Texas. He received an undergraduate degree from the University of Oklahoma in 1972 and a JD there three years later. He studied international economics at Scotland's University of Edinburgh as a Rotary International Graduate Fellow.

== Military service and entry into politics ==
McCurdy served in the United States Air Force Reserve, attaining the rank of major and serving as a judge advocate general (JAG). He was an assistant attorney general for the state of Oklahoma from 1975 to 1977.

== Congressional career ==
=== Congressional campaigns ===
McCurdy served for seven terms, from 1981-95. In 1980 he ran for Oklahoma's 4th congressional district seat in Congress, succeeding sixteen-term congressman Tom Steed from Shawnee. He trailed Oklahoma House Majority Leader James B. Townsend, also from Shawnee, in the Democratic primary 40% to 34%, then won 51.2% of the vote in the runoff election. McCurdy defeated Townsend with campaign commercials espousing prayer in public and support for a statue of Jesus Christ in the Wichita mountains, near Lawton.

He defeated Republican Howard Rutledge 74,245 to 71,339 in the general election, and again in 1982 by a vote of 84,205 to 44,351. He won a third term in 1984 by defeating Jerry Smith 109,447 to 60,844, with Libertarian Gordon Mobley picking up 1% of the vote. After winning 81.9% of the Democratic primary vote in 1986, McCurdy coasted to a fourth term with 94,984 votes (76.1%) over Republican Larry Humphreys. McCurdy had no Republican opponent in 1988, and won in 1990 with 73.6% of the vote in the general election. In 1992 he received 70.7% of the final tally.

=== Leadership positions ===
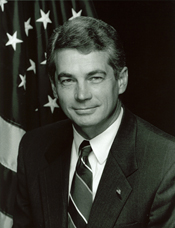
Dave McCurdy in the United States House of Representatives

Specializing in national security and intelligence issues, McCurdy was appointed to leadership positions in the field including chairmanships of the House Intelligence Committee, Military Installations and Facilities Subcommittee of the House Armed Services Committee and the Transportation Aviation and Materials Subcommittee of the Science and Space Committee.

=== Other work in Congress ===
McCurdy founded and chaired a group of moderate and conservative House Democrats called the Mainstreet Forum. At its height in 1994, it counted seventy-two members.

In Congress, McCurdy played a major role in the following pieces of legislation: the 1988 National Superconductivity Competitiveness Act, the 1985 Goldwater-Nichols Act, which re-organized the U.S. Department of Defense, the Nunn-McCurdy Amendment of 1982, requiring congressional notification of Defense cost overruns of 15% or more, and the 1993 National Service Legislation, which originated in a bill introduced by Congressman McCurdy and former Georgia Senator Sam Nunn.

=== DLC co-founder and 1992 presidential election ===
In the 1990s, McCurdy was a national chairman of the Democratic Leadership Council, a group that sought to moderate the Democratic Party. McCurdy was seen as a "rising national star." According to George Stephanopoulos in his political memoir, All Too Human, McCurdy at one point considered his own presidential campaign in 1992, although he eventually supported fellow DLC member Bill Clinton, and delivered a speech seconding his nomination at the Democratic Party National Convention. During the speech, "'McCurdy 2000' signs could be seen in the crowd."

Following Clinton's election, McCurdy was considered for United States Secretary of Defense, a job which ultimately went to Les Aspin. McCurdy was offered the role of Director of Central Intelligence, but turned it down.

=== 1994 run for the U.S. Senate ===
In 1994, when U.S. Senator David L. Boren decided to leave the U.S. Senate before the expiration of his term, McCurdy decided not to seek re-election to the House of Representatives; instead, he ran for the Senate. He campaigned on military preparedness and family values. He lost the general election to fellow congressman Jim Inhofe, whose campaign ads played clips of McCurdy's speech seconding Clinton's nomination for president. McCurdy took only 39 percent of the vote, and even lost his own congressional district. He sent his congressional records and papers to the Carl Albert Center for Congressional Studies at the University of Oklahoma.

== Career after Congress ==
McCurdy was chairman and chief executive officer of the McCurdy Group LLC. In 1998 he was elected President of the Electronic Industries Alliance (EIA) a national trade organization representing the electronics industry, even though House Majority Leader Tom DeLay held up legislation of benefit to the EIA and threatened it with a loss of access if it did not hire a Republican instead. DeLay was later rebuked by the House Ethics Committee.

He is chairman of the Center for Strategic and Budgetary Assessments and has served on the Defense Policy Board under presidents George W. Bush and Barack Obama.

On February 12, 2007, McCurdy became president of the Alliance of Automobile Manufacturers (AAM). Under McCurdy's leadership, AAM supported Obama's National Program to reduce carbon emissions and increase fuel economy standards and a federal ban on texting while driving.

In February 2011, McCurdy became president and CEO of the American Gas Association. In August 2011, McCurdy began service as a member of the Board of Directors of LMI, a not-for-profit studies and analysis consulting firm headquartered in McLean, Virginia. He also serves on the board of directors of the Committee for a Responsible Federal Budget.

== Personal ==
McCurdy lives with his wife, Dr. Pam McCurdy in McLean, Virginia; the couple has three children.

U.S. House of Representatives
Preceded by Tom Steed	Member of the U.S. House of Representatives from Oklahoma's 4th congressional district 1981–1995	Succeeded by J. C. Watts
Preceded by Anthony C. Beilenson	Chair of the House Intelligence Committee; 1991–1993	Succeeded by Dan Glickman
Party political offices
New office	Chair of the House Democratic Mainstream Forum; 1990–1995; Served alongside: Tim Penny	Position abolished
Preceded by John Breaux	Chair of the Democratic Leadership Council; 1993–1995	Succeeded by Joe Lieberman
Preceded by David L. Boren	Democratic nominee for U.S. Senator from Oklahoma (Class 2); 1994	Succeeded by James Boren
U.S. order of precedence (ceremonial)
Preceded by James R. Jones as Former U.S. Representative	Order of precedence of the United States as Former U.S. Representative	Succeeded by Ernest Istook as Former U.S. Representative
