= James Boren =

American politician

Personal details
- Born: James Harlan Boren; December 10, 1925 Wheatland, Oklahoma, U.S.
- Died: April 24, 2010 (aged 84) Tahlequah, Oklahoma, U.S.
- Party: Democratic
- Relatives: Lyle Boren (uncle); David Boren (cousin); Dan Boren (cousin)
- Education: University of Texas, Austin (BA, PhD); California State University, Long Beach (MA); University of Southern California (MA)

James Harlan Boren (10 December 1925 – 24 April 2010) was an American author and politician who is best known as a humorist and writer on bureaucratese, in which he poked fun at what he called "the vacuumental thinking and idiotoxicities of Washington". He was also a businessman, teacher, scholar, public servant, political operative, presidential candidate, and public speaker.

== Biography ==
James Harlan Boren was born in Wheatland, Oklahoma in 1925 to James B. and Una Lee Boren (née Hamilton); he was a nephew of Lyle Boren and Mae Boren Axton and first cousin of David Boren. He joined the United States Navy in 1942 at the age of 17, serving on the destroyer escort the USS William C. Cole at the Battle of Okinawa.

He studied at University of Texas at Austin (BA, PhD), California State University, Long Beach (MA), and University of Southern California (MA).

Boren initially worked in the independent oil business in Texas and Oklahoma.

In 1957 Boren was the campaign manager for Ralph Yarborough's successful bid to represent Texas in the United States Senate, and was Yarborough's chief of staff 1957-61. In 1961 President John F. Kennedy appointed him Deputy Director of the U.S. Economic Mission to Peru. There he conceived the idea of the Partners of the Alliance (now known as Partners of the Americas), and he spent seven years helping to build schools, equip hospitals, assist with potable water systems, and other economic development projects.

In 1970 he became President of Development Services International in Washington, D.C.

Boren then turned to reforming bureaucracy through the use of humor and political satire. He formed a spoof organization called the International Association of Professional Bureaucrats. He was in great demand as a professional speaker, and he wrote seven books, the most famous of which was When in Doubt Mumble: A Bureaucrat's Handbook. The title drew on his most famous quotation:

- "When in charge, ponder... When in trouble, delegate... When in doubt, mumble."

In 1991 he became a Scholar-in-Residence at Northeastern State University in Tahlequah, Oklahoma.

In 1992, Boren was an official (if not entirely serious) candidate for Vice President of the United States, for the Apathy Party of America. He offered what he said was the country's first multiple-choice political platform, and his slogan was "I have what it takes to take what you've got". In 1996 he was the Oklahoma Democratic Party nominee for the U.S. Senate but was unsuccessful.

He died in Tahlequah on 24 April 2010, aged 84. He was married three times.

== Books ==
Jim Boren's books included:

- When in Doubt, Mumble: A Bureaucrat's Handbook, 1972
- Fuzzify!: Borenwords and Strategies for Bureaucratic Success
- Have your way with bureaucrats; the layman's guide to pyramiding…
- Twiggle
- Bureaucratic Zoo: The Search for the Ultimate Mumble.
- Competent Expression of the English Language (Self Published University Text)

Party political offices
Preceded by Dave McCurdy	Democratic nominee for U.S. Senator from Oklahoma (Class 2); 1996	Succeeded by David Walters
