= 1994 United States Senate special election in Oklahoma =

- November 8, 1994
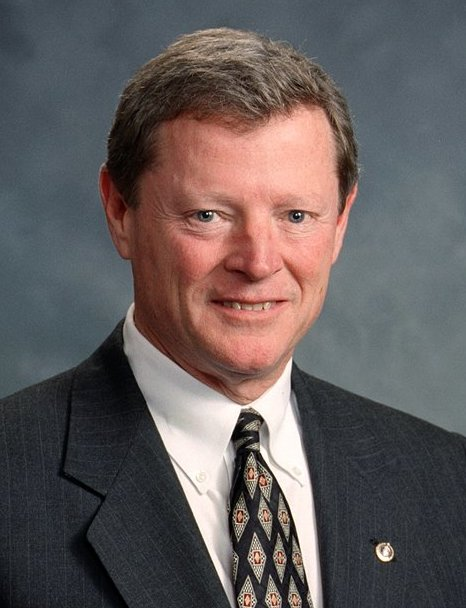

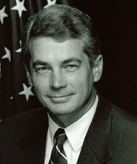
Nominee	Jim Inhofe	Dave McCurdy
Party	Republican	Democratic
Popular vote	542,390	392,488
Percentage	55.21%	39.95%
- County results Inhofe: 40–50% 50–60% 60–70% 70–80% McCurdy: 40–50% 50–60% 60–70%
U.S. senator before election
David Boren
Democratic
Elected U.S. Senator
Jim Inhofe
Republican

The 1994 United States Senate special election in Oklahoma was held November 8, 1994 in the wake of incumbent Democratic Senator David Boren's impending resignation to become President of the University of Oklahoma. Republican Jim Inhofe won the open seat with more than 55% of votes, despite having previously lost by 27.82% when he ran for Governor of Oklahoma against Boren in 1974.

== General election ==
- Danny Corn (Independent)
- Jim Inhofe, U.S. Representative from Tulsa (Republican)
- Dave McCurdy, U.S. Representative from Norman (Democratic)

== Results ==
General election results
Party	Candidate	Votes	%
Republican	Jim Inhofe	542,390	55.21%
Democratic	Dave McCurdy	392,488	39.95%
Independent	Danny Corn	47,552	4.84%
Majority		149,902	15.26%
Turnout		982,430	
Republican gain from Democratic			

== See also ==
- 1994 United States Senate elections
