= Wheatland, Oklahoma =

Wheatland
- Neighborhood
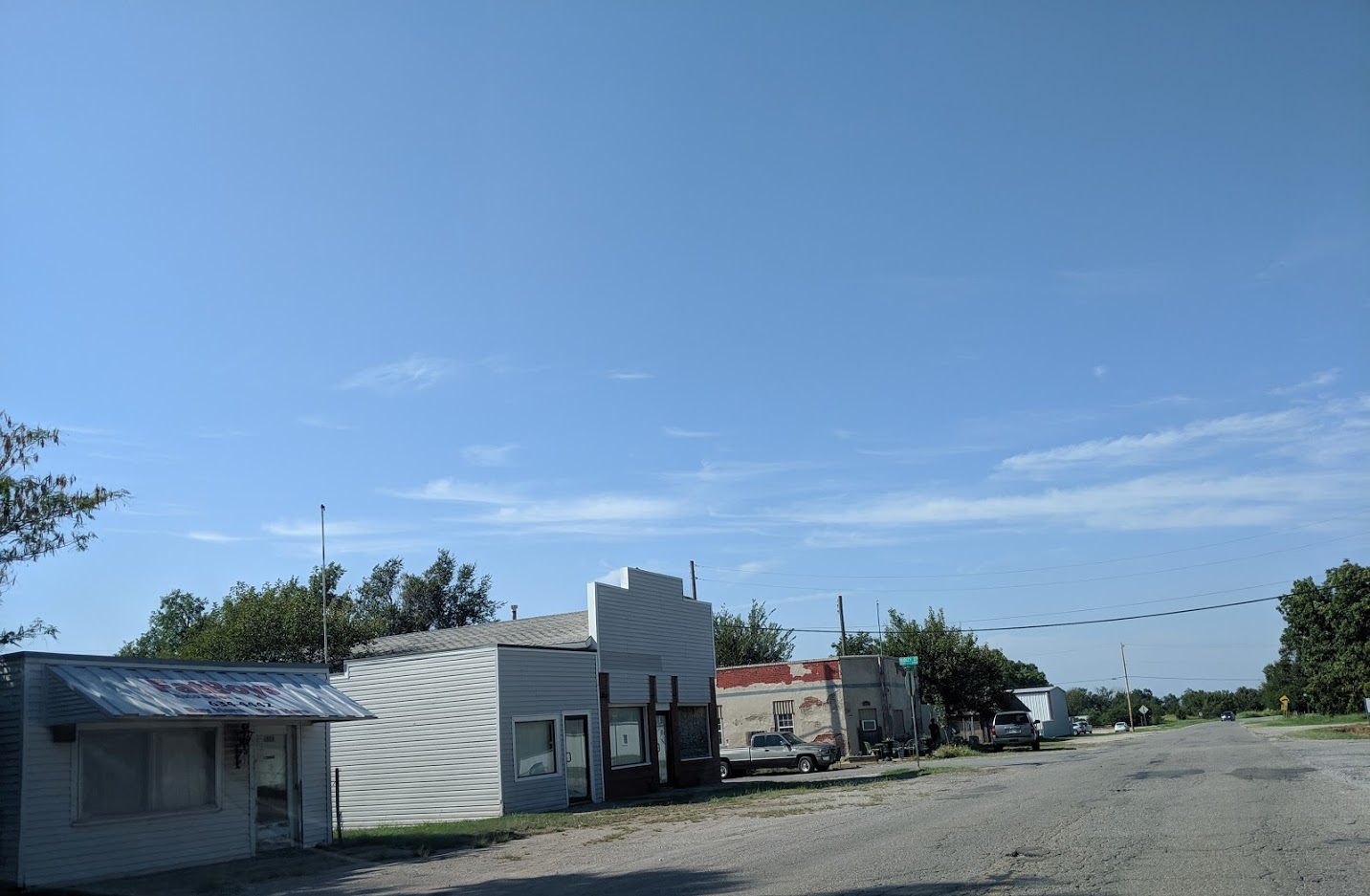
- Main Street in Wheatland, 2019

- Location within the state of Oklahoma Wheatland (the United States)
- Coordinates: 35°23′52″N 97°39′8″W
- Country: United States
- State: Oklahoma
- County: Oklahoma
- Elevation: 1,319 ft (402 m)

Population (2000)
  - Total: 39
- Time zone: UTC-6 (Central (CST))
  - Summer (DST): UTC-5 (CDT)
- ZIP codes: 73097, 73169
- GNIS feature ID: 1100120

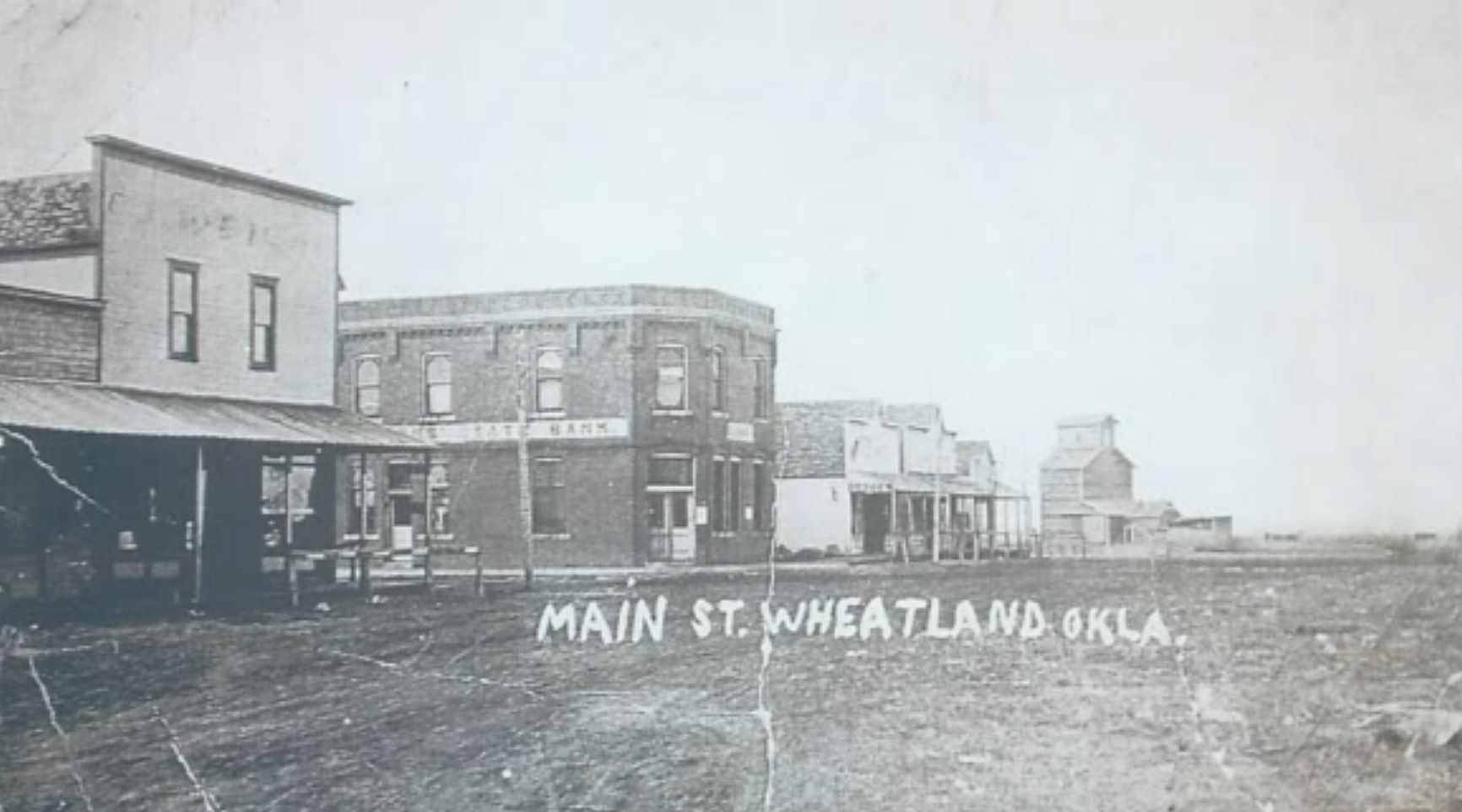
Wheatland, Oklahoma in 1889

Wheatland is a neighborhood located on State Highway 152 in southwestern Oklahoma City, Oklahoma, United States. ZIP Codes that cover the area include 73097 and 73169.

== History ==
Wheatland was formerly a rural town, but it was annexed by Oklahoma City in 1910. The town was named after its main crop, wheat.

The post office opened February 10, 1902. That same year, the town church was built.

The bank was built in 1904. In 1913, the bank was robbed by three men: George King, Charley Davis, and George "Harry" Williams. The men blew up the bank's safe with nitroglycerin. When the bank opened, it was initially called the Farmer's State Bank of Wheatland, but in 1922, the name was changed to First National Bank of Wheatland. The Great Depression was felt in both Wheatland and nearby Bethany. Bethany's local bank failed in 1932 and the town of Wheatland went into a decline from which it never recovered. With no future in Wheatland, in 1941 the bank relocated and changed its name to First National Bank of Bethany.

The Wheatland Weekly Watchword was published from 1909 to 1914 by the Suburban Newspaper Publishing Company. The Wheatland Weekly Watchword published poetry, sayings, local comings and goings, state and national news, and advertising. Hula Lisel was the editor.

In 1942, the population of Wheatland was 183.
