= 1926 United States Senate election in Oklahoma =

- November 2, 1926
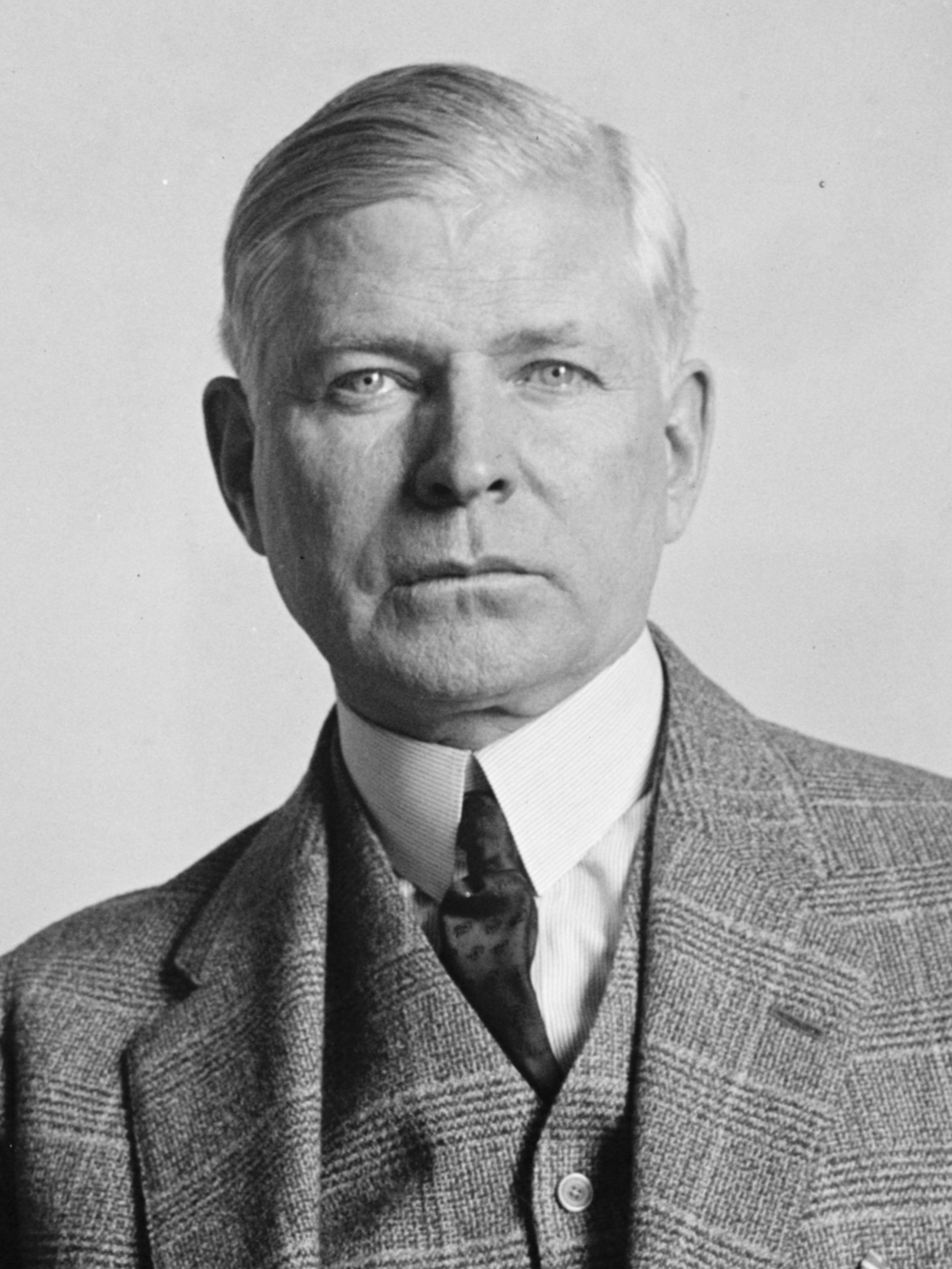

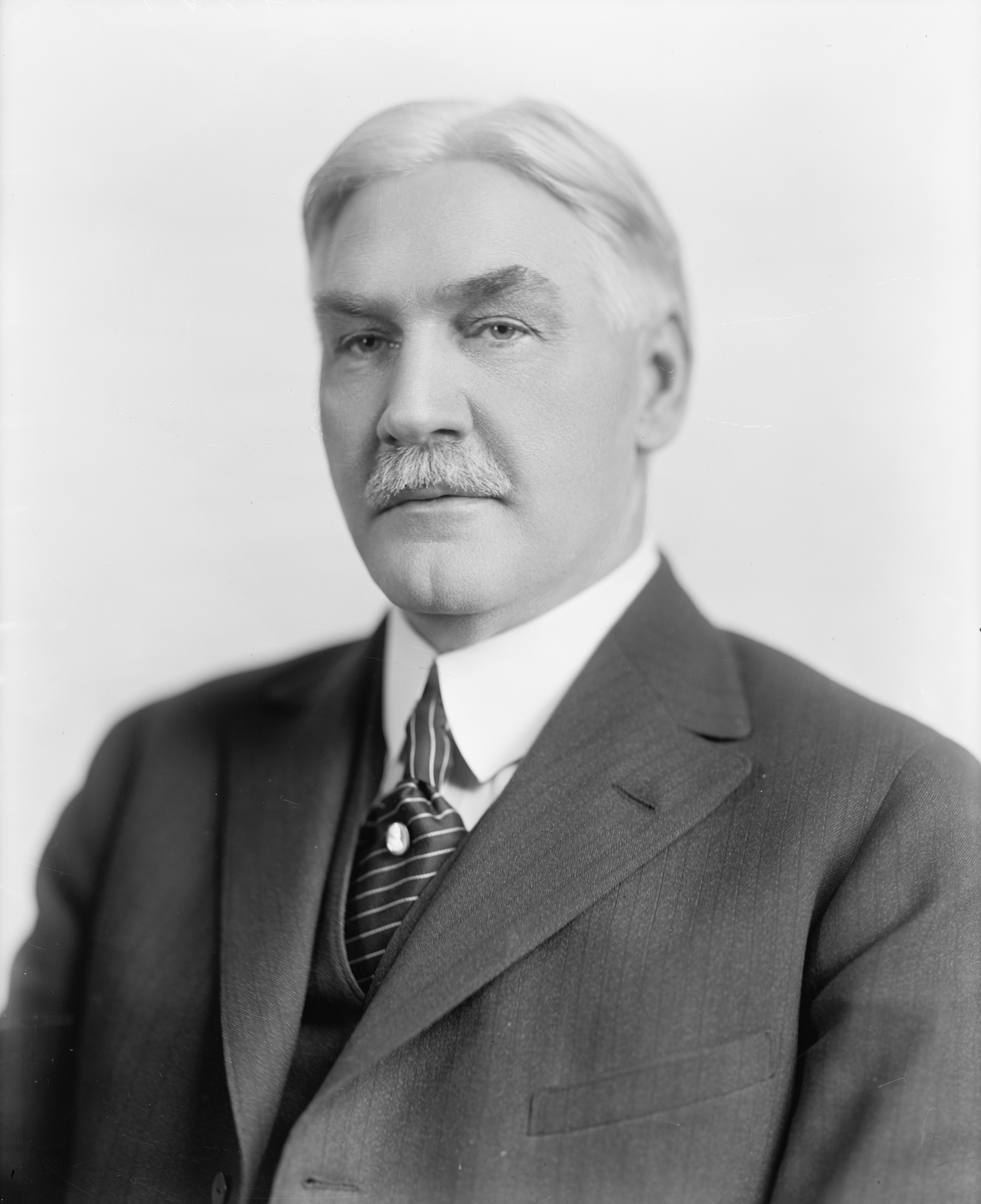
Nominee	Elmer Thomas	John W. Harreld
Party	Democratic	Republican
Popular vote	195,312	159,287
Percentage	54.78%	44.67%
- County results Thomas: 50–60% 60–70% 70–80% 80–90% Harreld: 40–50% 50–60% 60–70%
U.S. senator before election
John W. Harreld
Republican
Elected U.S. Senator
Elmer Thomas
Democratic

The 1926 United States Senate election in Oklahoma took place on November 2, 1926. Incumbent Republican Senator John W. Harreld ran for re-election to a second term. After facing many challengers in a crowded Republican primary, he advanced to the general election. In the Democratic primary, Congressman Elmer Thomas beat out a similarly crowded field, which included former Governor Jack C. Walton, to win his party's nomination with a plurality. In the general election, Thomas defeated Harreld in a landslide, winning his first of four terms in the U.S. Senate.

== Democratic primary ==
=== Candidates ===
- W. A. Ledbetter, former delegate to state constitutional convention
- Lamar Looney, State Senator from Harmon County
- M. L. Misenheimer, editor of the Lexington Bee
- Elmer Thomas, U.S. Representative from Medicine Park
- Jack C. Walton, former Governor of Oklahoma and Democratic nominee for U.S. Senate in 1924

=== Results ===
Democratic primary
Party	Candidate	Votes	%
Democratic	Elmer Thomas	85,490	42.60%
Democratic	Jack C. Walton	66,684	33.23%
Democratic	W. A. Ledbetter	26,615	13.26%
Democratic	Lamar Looney	18,270	9.10%
Democratic	M. L. Misenheimer	3,616	1.80%
Total votes		200,675	100.00%

== Republican primary ==
=== Candidates ===
- John W. Harreld, incumbent U.S. Senator
- U. S. Stone, Oklahoma City oilman
- Joe C. Fox, retired farmer
- John A. Buckles, former Enid Postmaster
- B. G. Bingham, farmer
- Preston A. Shinn
- D. Lafe Hubler

=== Results ===
Republican primary
Party	Candidate	Votes	%
Republican	John W. Harreld (inc.)	30,307	53.96%
Republican	Ulysses S. Stone	8,377	14.87%
Republican	Joe C. Fox	5,319	9.44%
Republican	John A. Buckles	4,151	7.37%
Republican	B. G. Bingham	3,155	5.60%
Republican	Preston A. Shinn	2,796	4.96%
Republican	D. Lafe Hubler	2,146	3.81%
Total votes		56,351	100.00%

== Socialist Primary ==
=== Candidates ===
- J. A. Hart

=== Results ===
Socialist primary
Party	Candidate	Votes	%
Socialist	J. A. Hart	131	100.00%
Total votes		131	100.00%

== Farmer–Labor Primary ==
=== Candidates ===
- J. Edwin Spurr

=== Results ===
Farmer–Labor primary
Party	Candidate	Votes	%
Farmer–Labor	J. Edwin Spurr	37	100.00%
Total votes		37	100.00%

== General election ==
=== Results ===
1926 United States Senate election in Oklahoma
Party	Candidate	Votes	%	±%
Democratic	Elmer Thomas	195,312	54.78%	+10.26%
Republican	John W. Harreld (inc.)	159,287	44.67%	−5.97%
Socialist	J. A. Hart	1,012	0.28%	−4.55%
Farmer–Labor	J. Edwin Spurr	791	0.22%	—
Independent	Thomas P. Hopley	152	0.04%	—
Majority		36,025	10.10%	+3.98%
Turnout		356,554		
Democratic gain from Republican				
