= Andrew Rice =

American politician

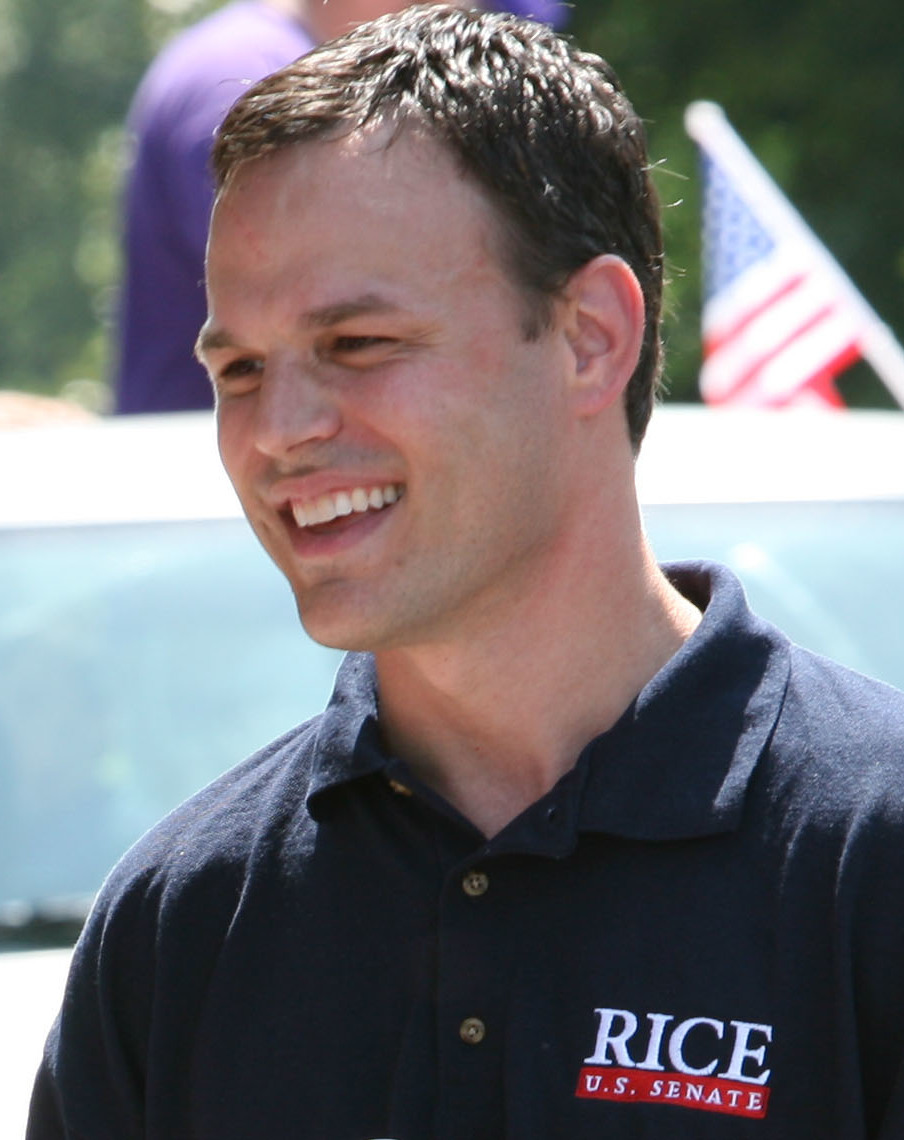
- Rice at a parade in Oklahoma City

Minority Leader of the Oklahoma Senate
- In office 2011–2012
- Preceded by: Charlie Laster
- Succeeded by: Sean Burrage

Member of the Oklahoma Senate from the 46th district
- In office November 2006 – January 15, 2012
- Preceded by: Bernest Cain
- Succeeded by: Al McAffrey

Personal details
- Born: April 23, 1973 (age 53) Oklahoma City, Oklahoma, U.S.
- Party: Democratic
- Spouse: Apple Newman
- Education: Christchurch School, Colby College, Harvard University
- Occupation: Non-profit director

Andrew Monroe Rice (born April 23, 1973) is an American civic leader and politician from Oklahoma. He represented Senate District 46 in the Oklahoma State Senate. He was the Democratic Party's nominee for the United States Senate in 2008, losing to incumbent U.S. Senator Jim Inhofe.

Rice worked as Foundation Fundraising Director of Variety Care health systems in Central Oklahoma, a non-profit group which serves moderate income families with health care.

He resigned from his Senate seat January 15, 2012, citing an out-of-state career opportunity for his wife.

In 2020, Rice published a novel, Ghosts of Ursino, and a collection of poems, Luminosity.

== Early life ==
Born and raised in Oklahoma City, Rice attended Casady School and graduated from Christchurch School. In 1996, he graduated from Colby College with a bachelor's degree in Religious Studies and in 1999 he earned his masters in Theological Studies from Harvard Divinity School in Cambridge, Massachusetts.

From 1996 to 1997 Rice studied drug addiction problems and treatment in urban India. During graduate school, Rice produced a documentary entitled From Ashes which focused on the AIDS epidemic in India.

In 2001, Rice's brother, David Harlow Rice, died in the September 11, 2001 attacks.

== State Senate ==
After winning the Democratic party's three-way primary for Senate district 46 on July 25, 2006, Rice won the general election garnering 69.5 percent of the vote. He was sworn into office on November 16, 2006.

Rice's Senate district encompasses downtown and the urban core of Oklahoma City and covers approximately 71,000 people.

In 2010, Rice was re-elected to the Oklahoma State Senate with 68 percent of the vote. For the 2011 & 2012 legislation sessions, Rice was elected by his colleagues to serve as the Senate Democratic Leader making him the highest ranking Democrat in state government.

On October 18, 2011, Rice announced his resignation effective January 15, 2012, citing an out-of-state career opportunity for his wife.

=== Sponsored legislation ===
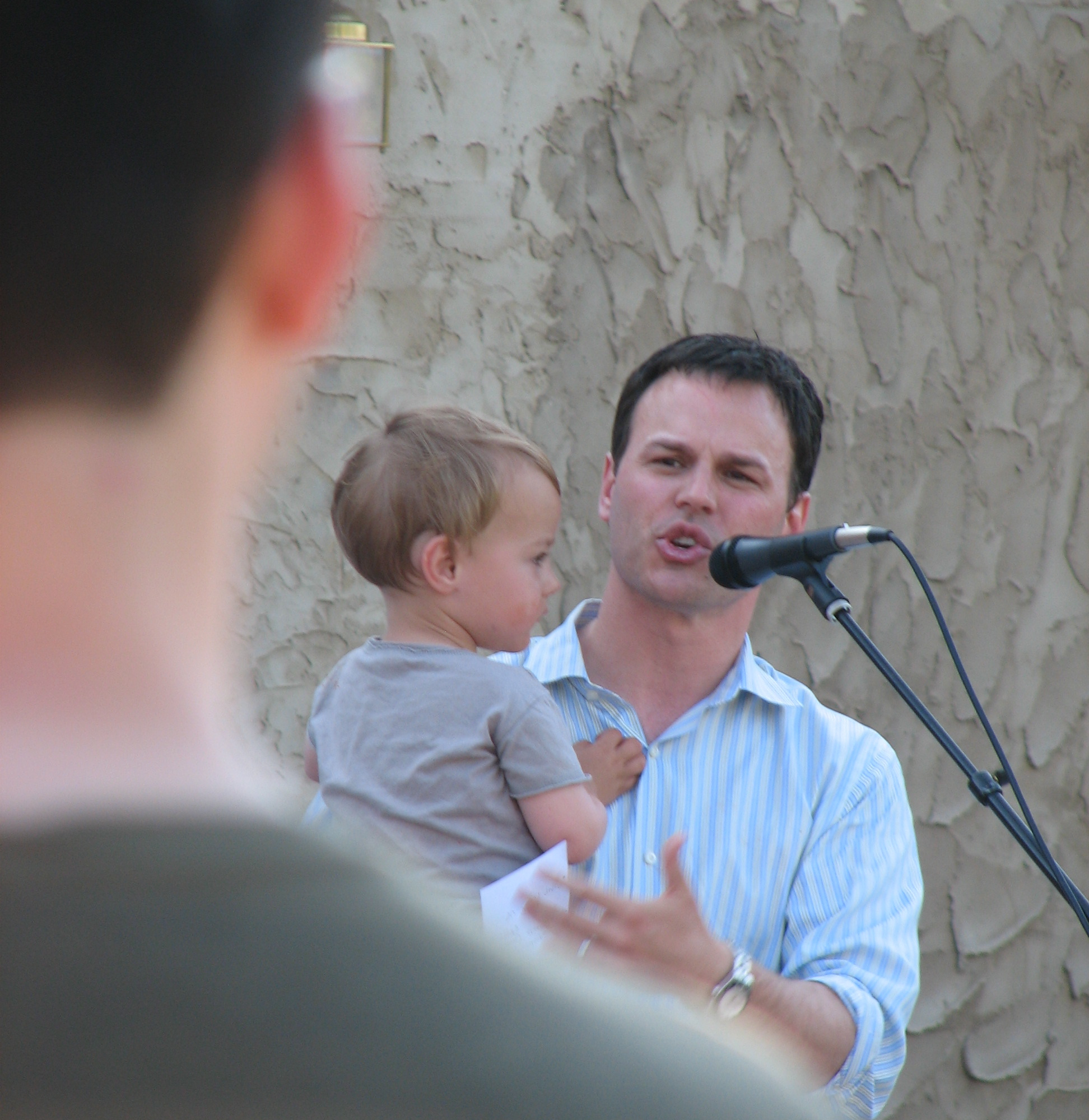
Senator Rice addressing a crowd in Oklahoma City

*Cosponsored and helped pass legislation called the "All Kids Act" to add 38,000 Oklahoma children to those eligible for government-sponsored health insurance.

- Led a successful effort to make it easier for local governments to donate abandoned properties for use by Habitat for Humanity to construct affordable housing, especially in rural Oklahoma.
- Co-author of the legislation creating the Hunger Task Force to tackle the problem of hunger in Oklahoma.
- Authored legislation creating a state Veterans Health Insurance Program that provides coverage to uninsured Oklahoma veterans. The legislation was passed by the senate with 45–1 vote.Scheirman, Katharine (2008-03-03). "Senator Andrew Rice Veteran Health Insurance Plan Passes Oklahoma Senate". VetVoice. VoteVets.org. Archived from the original on 2009-04-03.

== 2008 U.S. Senate Election ==
Rice officially filed as a candidate for the United States Senate from Oklahoma on Monday, June 2, 2008. He won the Democratic primary against Jim Rogers on July 29, 2008 but was defeated in the general election on November 4, 2008 by incumbent Republican Jim Inhofe, who won reelection to a fourth term in a landslide.

== Personal ==
In 2004, Rice founded of the Progressive Alliance Foundation which worked throughout the state of Oklahoma advancing progressive, fair-minded and constitutional solutions to public policy problems. He also launched the Red River Democracy Project and was on the board of The People's Opinion Project. For 3 years, Rice was the Executive Director of Teen Recovery Solutions in Oklahoma City, which operates Oklahoma's only accredited recovery High School for teens dealing with addiction, Mission Academy. On September 11, 2001, Rice lost a brother in the 9/11 attacks.

Rice is also a writer. He has published a novel, Ghosts of Ursino, and a collection of poems, Luminosity.

Rice is married to Dr. Apple Newman Rice who practices medicine in Oklahoma City. They have two sons and reside in Oklahoma City.

== Electoral history ==
2010 Oklahoma General Election - Senate District 46
Party	Candidate	Votes	%	±%
Democratic	Andrew Rice	7,548	68.28%	
Republican	Joshua Jantz	3,507	31.72%	

2008 Oklahoma General Election - U.S. Senate
Party	Candidate	Votes	%	±%
Republican	Jim Inhofe	763,375	56.68%	
Democratic	Andrew Rice	527,736	39.18%	
Independent	Stephen P. Wallace	55,708	4.14%	

2008 Oklahoma Democratic Primary Election - U.S. Senate
Party	Candidate	Votes	%	±%
Democratic	Andrew Rice	113,795	59.65%	
Democratic	Jim Rogers	76,981	40.35%	

2006 Oklahoma General Election - Senate District 46
Party	Candidate	Votes	%	±%
Democratic	Andrew Rice	7,342	69.53%	
Republican	Joshua Jantz	3,217	30.47%	

2006 Oklahoma Democratic Primary Election - Senate District 46
Party	Candidate	Votes	%	±%
Democratic	Andrew Rice	2,383	60.90%	
Democratic	Rhonda Rudd	1,084	27.70%	
Democratic	Drew Dugan	446	11.40%	

Party political offices
Preceded by David Walters	Democratic nominee for U.S. Senator from Oklahoma (Class 2); 2008	Succeeded by Matt Silverstein
