= 1944 United States Senate election in Oklahoma =

- November 7, 1944
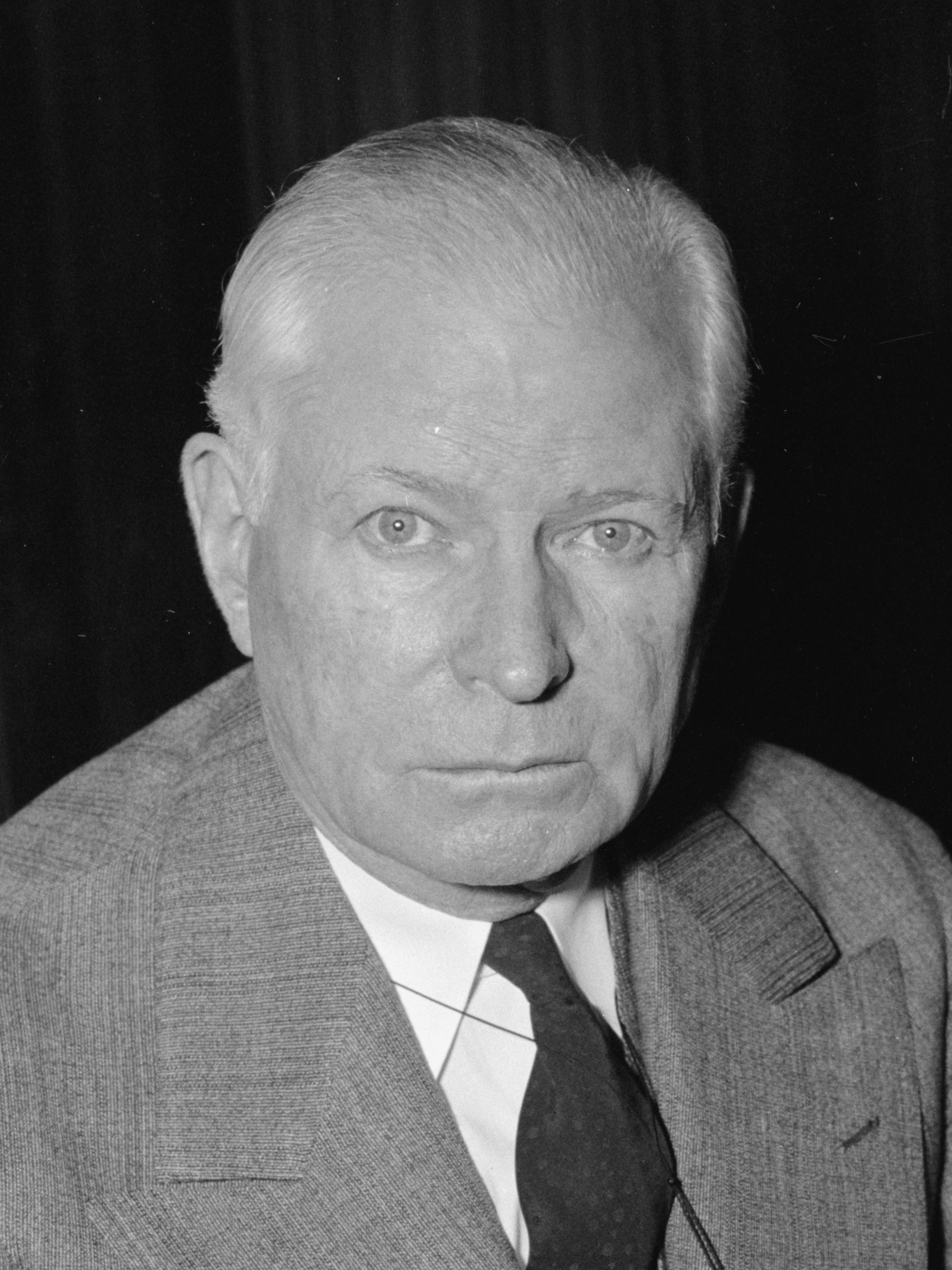

Nominee	Elmer Thomas	William Otjen
Party	Democratic	Republican
Popular vote	390,851	309,222
Percentage	55.65%	44.02%
- County results Thomas: 50–60% 60–70% 70–80% 80–90% Otjen: 40–50% 50–60% 60–70% 70–80%
U.S. senator before election
Elmer Thomas
Democratic
Elected U.S. Senator
Elmer Thomas
Democratic

The 1944 United States Senate election in Oklahoma took place on November 7, 1944. Incumbent Democratic Senator Elmer Thomas ran for re-election to a fourth term. Thomas once again faced a stiff challenge in the Democratic primary, this time from Congressman Wesley E. Disney and Lieutenant Governor James E. Berry. As was the case in 1938, Thomas won renomination only with a narrow plurality. In the general election, he faced former State Senator William Otjen, the 1942 Republican nominee for Governor. Though Thomas's performance was much reduced compared to six years prior, he still defeated Otjen by a wide margin.

== Democratic primary ==
=== Candidates ===
- Elmer Thomas, incumbent U.S. Senator
- Wesley E. Disney, U.S. Congressman from Oklahoma's 1st congressional district
- James E. Berry, Lieutenant Governor of Oklahoma
- Elmer Fraker
- Fletcher S. Riley
- A. F. Shaw
- Dan Nelson
- Charles West
- Lily Allen Lasley
- Lattie Hughes

=== Results ===
Democratic primary
Party	Candidate	Votes	%
Democratic	Elmer Thomas (inc.)	85,672	36.30%
Democratic	Wesley E. Disney	64,322	33.75%
Democratic	James E. Berry	62,244	26.37%
Democratic	Elmer Fraker	5,810	2.46%
Democratic	Fletcher S. Riley	4,835	2.05%
Democratic	A. F. Shaw	4,786	2.03%
Democratic	Dan Nelson	2,725	1.15%
Democratic	Charles West	2,304	0.98%
Democratic	Lily Allen Lasley	1,963	0.83%
Democratic	Lattie Hughes	138	0.57%
Total votes		235,999	100.00%

== Republican primary ==
=== Candidates ===
- William Otjen, former State Senator, 1942 Republican nominee for Governor
- Pat W. Murphy, Cushing clergyman
- Harry O. Glasser, former State Senator, 1938 Republican nominee for the U.S. Senate
- O. O. Owens
- Frank A. Anderson
- Fred E. Pickard
- John M. Claypool
- S. M. Stauffer
- Sim L. Liles

=== Results ===
Republican primary
Party	Candidate	Votes	%
Republican	William Otjen	21,970	50.53%
Republican	Pat W. Murphy	7,340	16.88%
Republican	Harry O. Glasser	6,169	14.19%
Republican	O. O. Owens	2,791	6.42%
Republican	Frank A. Anderson	2,009	4.62%
Republican	Fred E. Pickard	1,137	2.61%
Republican	John M. Claypool	887	2.04%
Republican	S. M. Stauffer	811	1.87%
Republican	Sim L. Liles	368	0.85%
Total votes		43,482	100.00%

== General election ==
=== Results ===
1944 United States Senate election in Oklahoma
Party	Candidate	Votes	%	±%
Democratic	Elmer Thomas (inc.)	390,851	55.65%	−9.72%
Republican	William Otjen	309,222	44.02%	+10.11%
Independent	Paul V. Beck	1,128	0.16%	—
Independent	T. B. Williams	674	0.10%	—
Independent	Paul R. Nagle	519	0.07%	—
Majority		81,629	11.62%	−19.84%
Turnout		702,394		
Democratic hold				
