= 1932 United States Senate election in Oklahoma =

- November 8, 1932
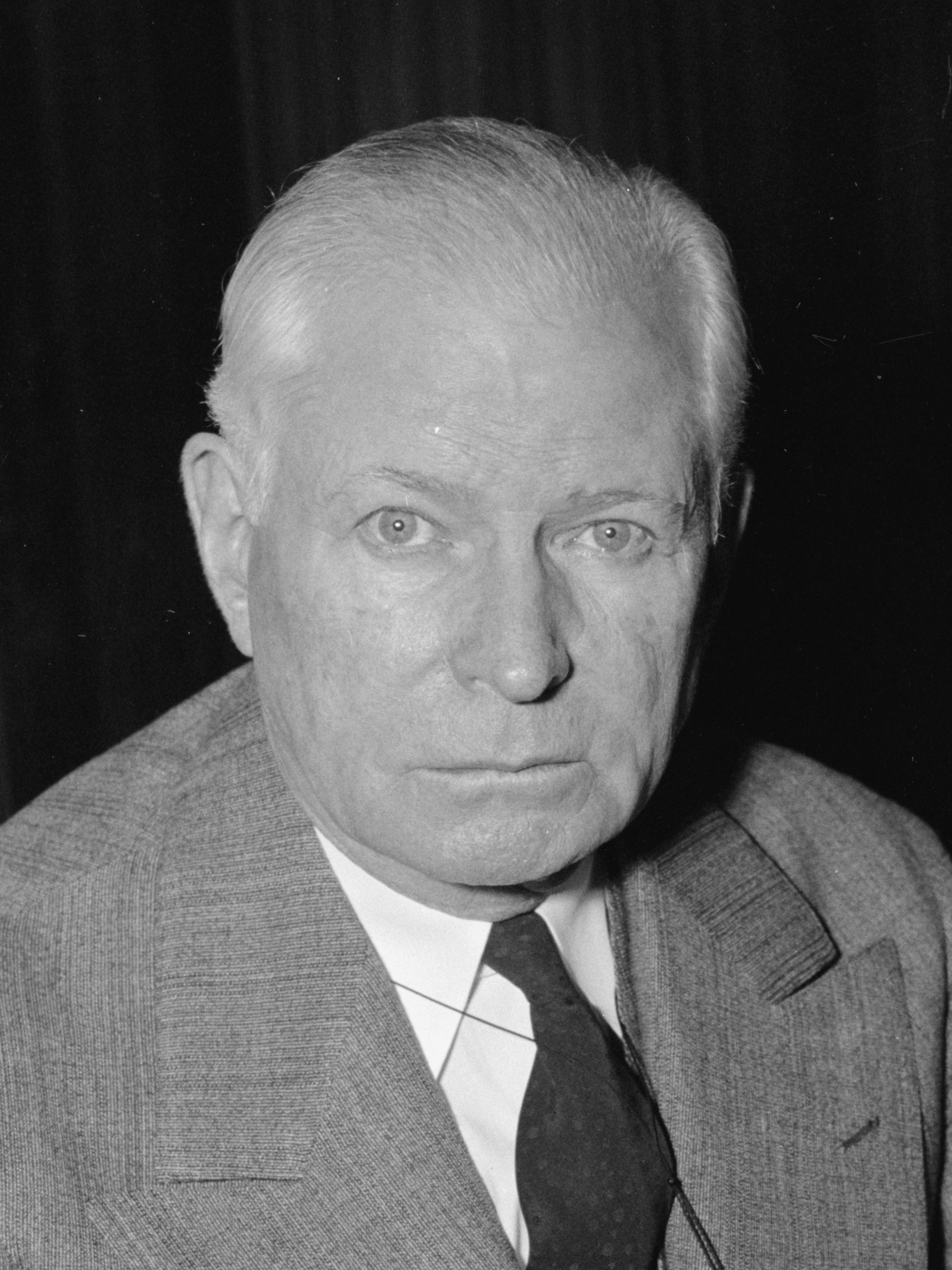

Nominee	Elmer Thomas	Wirt Franklin
Party	Democratic	Republican
Popular vote	426,130	218,854
Percentage	65.51%	33.70%
- County results Thomas: 40–50% 50–60% 60–70% 70–80% 80–90% >90% Franklin: 40–50% 50–60%
U.S. senator before election
Elmer Thomas
Democratic
Elected U.S. Senator
Elmer Thomas
Democratic

The 1932 United States Senate election in Oklahoma took place on November 8, 1932. Incumbent Democratic senator Elmer Thomas ran for re-election to a second term. Thomas faced a crowded path to renomination, and only won the Democratic primary following a runoff election with attorney Gomer Smith. On the Republican side, oil magnate Wirt Franklin similarly won the Republican nomination in a runoff election. Thomas overwhelmingly defeated Franklin to win re-election, aided by Democratic presidential nominee Franklin D. Roosevelt's landslide win in Oklahoma over Republican president Herbert Hoover.

== Democratic primary ==
=== Candidates ===
- Elmer Thomas, incumbent U.S. Senator
- Gomer Smith, attorney
- R. M. McCool, Chairman of the Oklahoma Democratic Party
- Albert C. Hunt, former Oklahoma Supreme Court Justice
- Lee Wade, Duncan contractor
- Moses E. Harris
- D. O. Witmer, Cardin salesman, druggist

=== Results ===
Democratic primary
Party	Candidate	Votes	%
Democratic	Elmer Thomas (inc.)	145,452	42.07%
Democratic	Gomer Smith	76,249	22.06%
Democratic	R. M. McCool	54,934	15.89%
Democratic	Albert C. Hunt	31,440	9.09%
Democratic	Lee Wade	18,050	5.22%
Democratic	Moses E. Harris	12,977	3.75%
Democratic	D. O. Witmer	6,618	1.91%
Total votes		345,720	100.00%

=== Runoff election results ===
Democratic primary runoff
Party	Candidate	Votes	%
Democratic	Elmer Thomas (inc.)	251,248	60.86%
Democratic	Gomer Smith	161,594	39.14%
Total votes		412,842	100.00%

== Republican primary ==
=== Candidates ===
- Wirt Franklin, oil producer
- James A. Harris, former chairman of the Oklahoma Republican Party
- Ulysses S. Stone, former U.S. Congressman from Oklahoma's 5th congressional district
- R. F. Bingham
- Rexford B. Cragg

=== Results ===
Republican primary
Party	Candidate	Votes	%
Republican	Wirt Franklin	30,586	40.96%
Republican	James A. Harris	17,298	23.17%
Republican	Ulysses S. Stone	15,427	20.66%
Republican	R. F. Bingham	6,349	8.50%
Republican	Rexford B. Cragg	5,006	6.70%
Total votes		74,666	100.00%

=== Runoff election results ===
Republican primary runoff
Party	Candidate	Votes	%
Republican	Wirt Franklin	42,090	59.04%
Republican	James A. Harris	29,195	40.96%
Total votes		71,285	100.00%

== General election ==
=== Results ===
1932 United States Senate election in Oklahoma
Party	Candidate	Votes	%	±%
Democratic	Elmer Thomas (inc.)	426,130	65.51%	+10.83%
Republican	Wirt Franklin	218,854	33.70%	−10.98%
Farmer–Labor	James I. Whidden	1,395	0.21%	−0.01%
Independent	J. W. Houchin	1,245	0.19%	—
Independent	John Franing	1,061	0.16%	—
Independent	Thomas P. Hopley	819	0.13%	—
Majority		207,276	31.91%	+21.81%
Turnout		649,504		
Democratic hold				
