= 1938 United States Senate election in Oklahoma =

- November 8, 1938
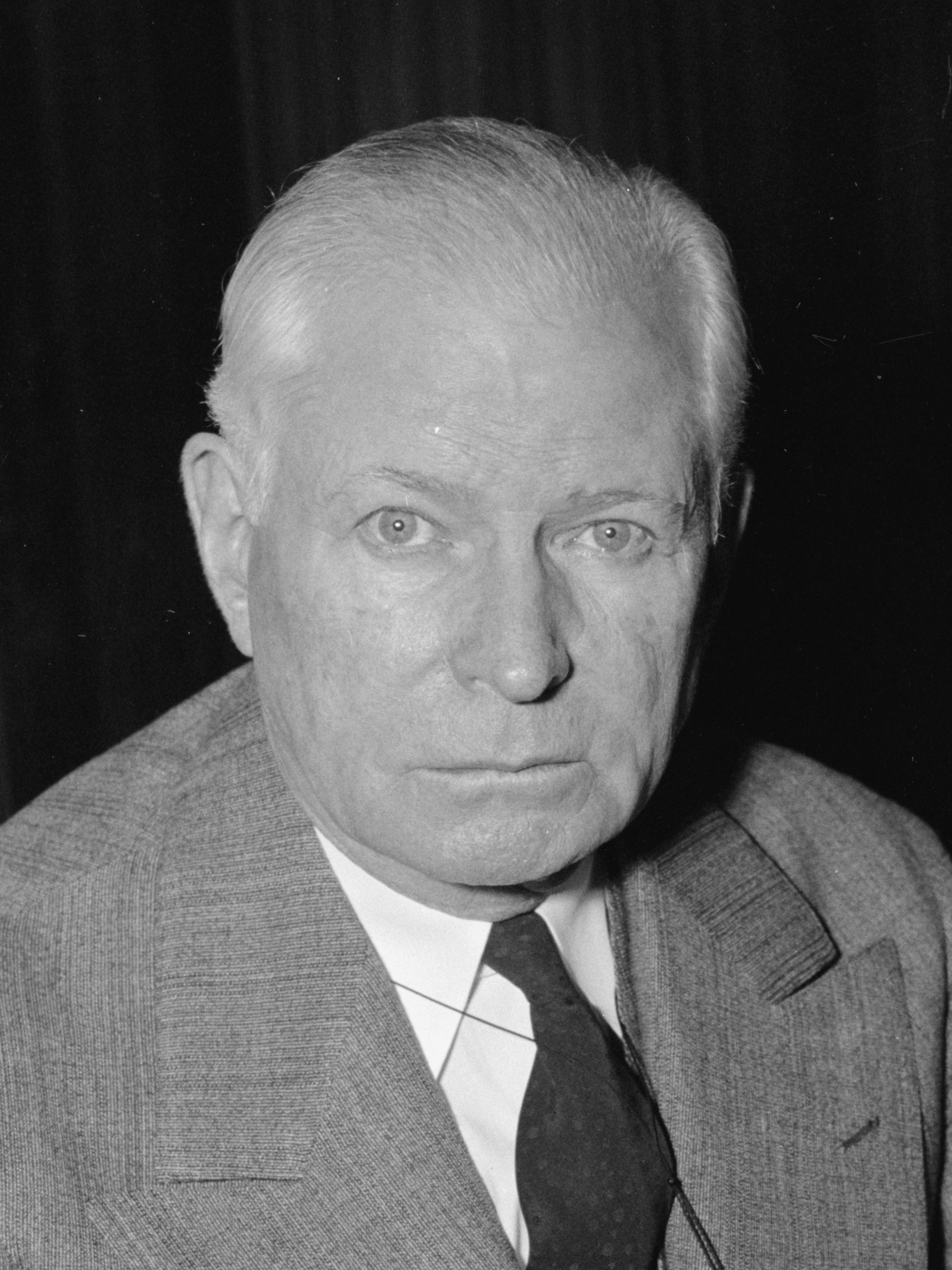

Nominee	Elmer Thomas	Harry O. Glasser
Party	Democratic	Republican
Popular vote	307,936	159,734
Percentage	65.37%	33.91%
- County results Thomas: 40–50% 50–60% 60–70% 70–80% 80–90% Glasser: 40–50% 50–60%
U.S. senator before election
Elmer Thomas
Democratic
Elected U.S. Senator
Elmer Thomas
Democratic

The 1938 United States Senate election in Oklahoma took place on November 8, 1938. Incumbent Democratic Senator Elmer Thomas ran for re-election to a third term. He faced a spirited challenge in the Democratic primary from Congressman Gomer Smith and Governor E. W. Marland, but won the nomination with a slim plurality. In the general election, Thomas faced former State Senator Harry O. Glasser, the Republican nominee. Despite the nationwide trend favoring Republicans, Thomas overwhelmingly won re-election.

== Democratic primary ==
=== Candidates ===
- Elmer Thomas, incumbent U.S. Senator
- Gomer Smith, U.S. Congressman from Oklahoma's 5th congressional district, 1932 Democratic candidate for the U.S. Senate
- E. W. Marland, Governor of Oklahoma
- Charles Francis Smith

=== Results ===
Democratic primary
Party	Candidate	Votes	%
Democratic	Elmer Thomas (inc.)	252,550	44.68%
Democratic	Gomer Smith	190,774	33.75%
Democratic	E. W. Marland	115,625	20.46%
Democratic	Charles Francis Smith	6,256	1.11%
Total votes		565,205	100.00%

== Republican primary ==
=== Candidates ===
- Harry O. Glasser, former State Senator
- James D. Davidson, real estate salesman
- William O. Cromwell, former Oklahoma Attorney General, 1914 Progressive nominee for the U.S. Senate
- Wilfred Marion Leise

=== Results ===
Republican primary
Party	Candidate	Votes	%
Republican	Harry O. Glasser	17,668	36.04%
Republican	James S. Davidson	14,228	29.03%
Republican	William O. Cromwell	12,989	26.50%
Republican	Wilfred Marion Leise	4,133	8.43%
Total votes		49,018	100.00%

== Prohibition primary ==
=== Candidates ===
- P. C. Nelson
- A. B. Lamb

=== Results ===
Prohibition primary
Party	Candidate	Votes	%
Prohibition	P. C. Nelson	91	54.49%
Prohibition	A. B. Lamb	76	45.51%
Total votes		167	100.00%

== General election ==
=== Results ===
1938 United States Senate election in Oklahoma
Party	Candidate	Votes	%	±%
Democratic	Elmer Thomas (inc.)	307,936	65.37%	−0.24%
Republican	Harry O. Glasser	159,734	33.91%	+0.21%
Prohibition	P.C. Nelson	2,220	0.47%	—
Independent	Raymond Burton Clark	603	0.13%	—
Independent	Herndon J. Thompson	573	0.12%	—
Majority		148,202	31.46%	−0.45%
Turnout		471,066		
Democratic hold				
