= William B. Pine =

American politician (1877–1942)

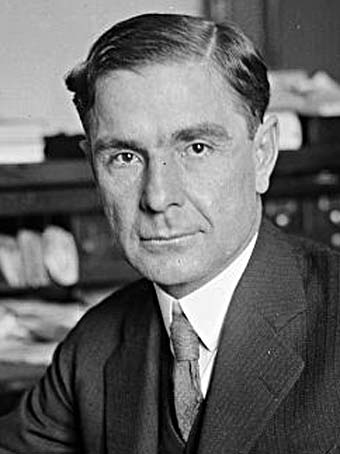

United States Senator from Oklahoma
- In office March 4, 1925 – March 4, 1931
- Preceded by: Robert L. Owen
- Succeeded by: Thomas Gore

Personal details
- Born: William Bliss Pine; December 30, 1877 Bluffs, Illinois, U.S.
- Died: August 25, 1942 (aged 64) Okmulgee, Oklahoma, U.S.
- Party: Republican
- Spouse: Laura M. Hamilton

William Bliss Pine (December 30, 1877 – August 25, 1942) was an American businessman who served as United States senator from Oklahoma. Born in Illinois, he moved to Kansas and finally Oklahoma, where he became a prominent businessman and oil producer. As a senator, he was economically conservative, but considered progressive in his agricultural positions. With the onset of the Great Depression, he and many other Republican politicians were turned out of office.

== Early life and career ==
Born in Bluffs, Illinois, Pine graduated from a high school in Naples, Illinois in 1896 and taught school for three years while selling harvesters during the summer. He became a traveling salesman with the D. M. Osborne Company, which took him to Neosho County, Kansas, where he got caught up in oil fever.

He moved to Chanute, Kansas, and was employed in the oil producing business; he moved to Oklahoma in 1904 and continued in the oil industry. In 1909 he located in Okmulgee, Oklahoma, where he eventually became extensively engaged in the production of oil.

Pine married his high school sweetheart, Laura M. Hamilton, in 1912.

He became one of the state's leading independent oil producers and a prominent Okmulgee businessman.

== Political career ==
Pine was elected as a Republican to the U.S. Senate and served from March 4, 1925, to March 4, 1931; he was an unsuccessful candidate for reelection in 1930, after which he resumed his former business pursuits.

Called a "regular Republican" for his positions on the economy, the senator sided with the "Progressive" part of his party on matters related to agriculture and foreign affairs. He supported protective legislation for the petroleum industry and fought to bring federal road projects to Oklahoma.

In 1924, William Shelly Rogers, the Cyclops of the Tulsa Klan, travelled to Kansas City to pledge the votes of the Klan to Pines' Senate bid. At the time, many Klansmen identified with the policies of the Southern Democrats and crossed party lines for the first time. The Indian Journal charged him as a "Republican Klansman."

The Great Depression virtually destroyed the Republican Party in Oklahoma, one of the reasons Pine was not reelected.

He was an unsuccessful candidate for governor in 1934.

== Death ==
Pine died in Okmulgee in 1942; at the time of his death, he was the Republican nominee for the U.S. Senate. Interment was in Okmulgee Cemetery.

== Bibliography ==
=== General references ===
1. William B. Pine Collection at the Carl Albert Center
2. "William B. Pine". Biographical Directory of the United States Congress (id: P000360). United States Congress.

Party political offices
Preceded by W. B. Johnson	Republican nominee for U.S. Senator from Oklahoma (Class 2); 1924, 1930	Succeeded by Herbert K. Hyde
Preceded by Ira A. Hill	Republican nominee for Governor of Oklahoma; 1934	Succeeded by Ross Rizley
Preceded by Herbert K. Hyde	Republican nominee for U.S. Senator from Oklahoma (Class 2); 1942	Succeeded by Edward H. Moore
U.S. Senate
Preceded by Robert L. Owen	U.S. senator (Class 2) from Oklahoma; March 4, 1925 – March 4, 1931; Served alongside: John W. Harreld, Elmer Thomas	Succeeded by Thomas P. Gore
