= 1930 United States Senate election in Oklahoma =

- November 4, 1930
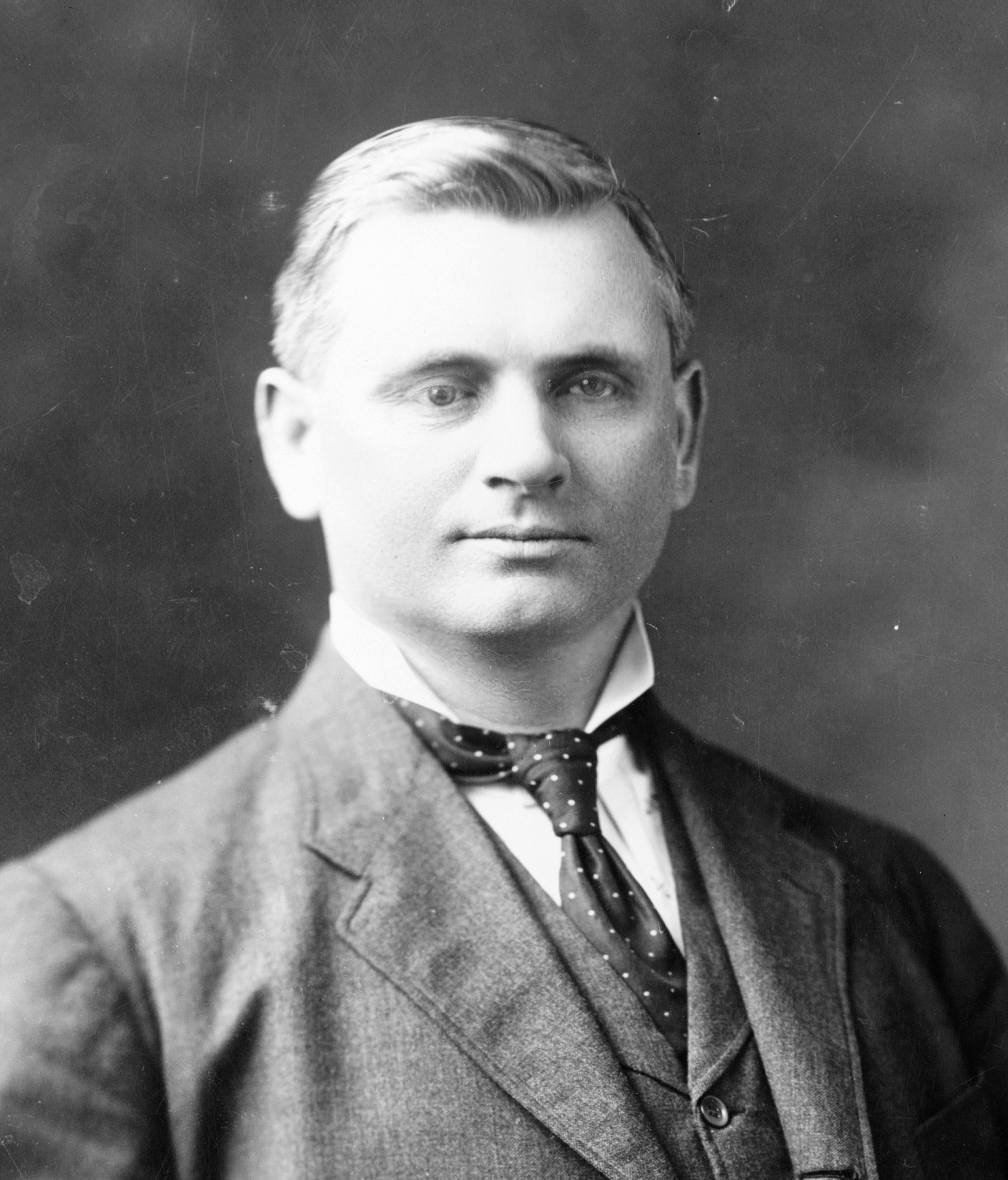

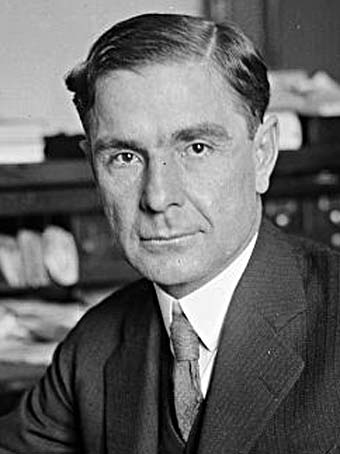
Nominee	Thomas Gore	William B. Pine
Party	Democratic	Republican
Popular vote	255,838	232,589
Percentage	52.29%	47.54%
- County results Gore: 50–60% 60–70% 70–80% 80–90% Pine: 50–60% 60–70%
U.S. senator before election
William B. Pine
Republican
Elected U.S. Senator
Thomas Gore
Democratic

The 1930 United States Senate election in Oklahoma took place on November 4, 1930. Incumbent Republican Senator William B. Pine ran for re-election to a second term. In the Democratic primary, former U.S. Senator Thomas Gore emerged victorious in a crowded Democratic primary that included three former governors and one of the first female candidates for statewide office. Gore won a slim plurality in the initial election, and defeated C. J. Wrightsman, an oilman from Tulsa, in the runoff by a wide margin. In the general election, aided by the national Democratic landslide, Gore narrowly defeated Pine, returning to the Senate for one final term.

== Democratic primary ==
=== Candidates ===
- Thomas Gore, former U.S. Senator
- C. J. Wrightsman, Tulsa oilman, 1924 Democratic candidate for the U.S. Senate
- Henry S. Johnston, former governor of Oklahoma
- Lee Cruce, former governor of Oklahoma
- James B. A. Robertson, former governor of Oklahoma
- Charles W. Harris
- Kathryn Van Leuven, former assistant attorney general of Oklahoma
- William L. McCann
- E. G. Barnard
- Woodson Norvell

=== Results ===
Democratic primary
Party	Candidate	Votes	%
Democratic	Thomas Gore	72,984	25.77%
Democratic	C. J. Wrightsman	72,823	25.71%
Democratic	Henry S. Johnston	55,814	19.71%
Democratic	Lee Cruce	41,448	14.64%
Democratic	James B. A. Robertson	14,573	5.15%
Democratic	Charles W. Harris	7,203	2.54%
Democratic	Kathryn Van Leuven	6,662	2.35%
Democratic	William L. McCann	4,332	1.53%
Democratic	E. G. Barnard	4,173	1.47%
Democratic	Woodson Norvell	3,189	5.15%
Total votes		283,201	100.00%

=== Runoff election results ===
Democratic primary runoff
Party	Candidate	Votes	%
Democratic	Thomas Gore	179,366	58.25%
Democratic	C. J. Wrightsman	128,573	41.75%
Total votes		307,939	100.00%

== Republican primary ==
=== Candidates ===
- William B. Pine, incumbent U.S. Senator
- Charles J. Benson
- J. J. Bebout

=== Results ===
Republican primary
Party	Candidate	Votes	%
Republican	William B. Pine (inc.)	54,915	78.19%
Republican	Charles J. Benson	10,922	15.55%
Republican	J. J. Bebout	4,395	6.26%
Total votes		70,232	100.00%

== General election ==
=== Results ===
1930 United States Senate election in Oklahoma
Party	Candidate	Votes	%	±%
Democratic	Thomas Gore	255,838	52.29%	+16.75%
Republican	William B. Pine (inc.)	232,589	47.54%	−13.92%
Independent	Edward D. Evans	614	0.13%	—
Independent	Thomas P. Hopley	218	0.04%	—
Majority		23,249	4.75%	−21.17%
Turnout		552,621		
Democratic gain from Republican				
