= 2008 United States Senate election in Oklahoma =

- November 4, 2008
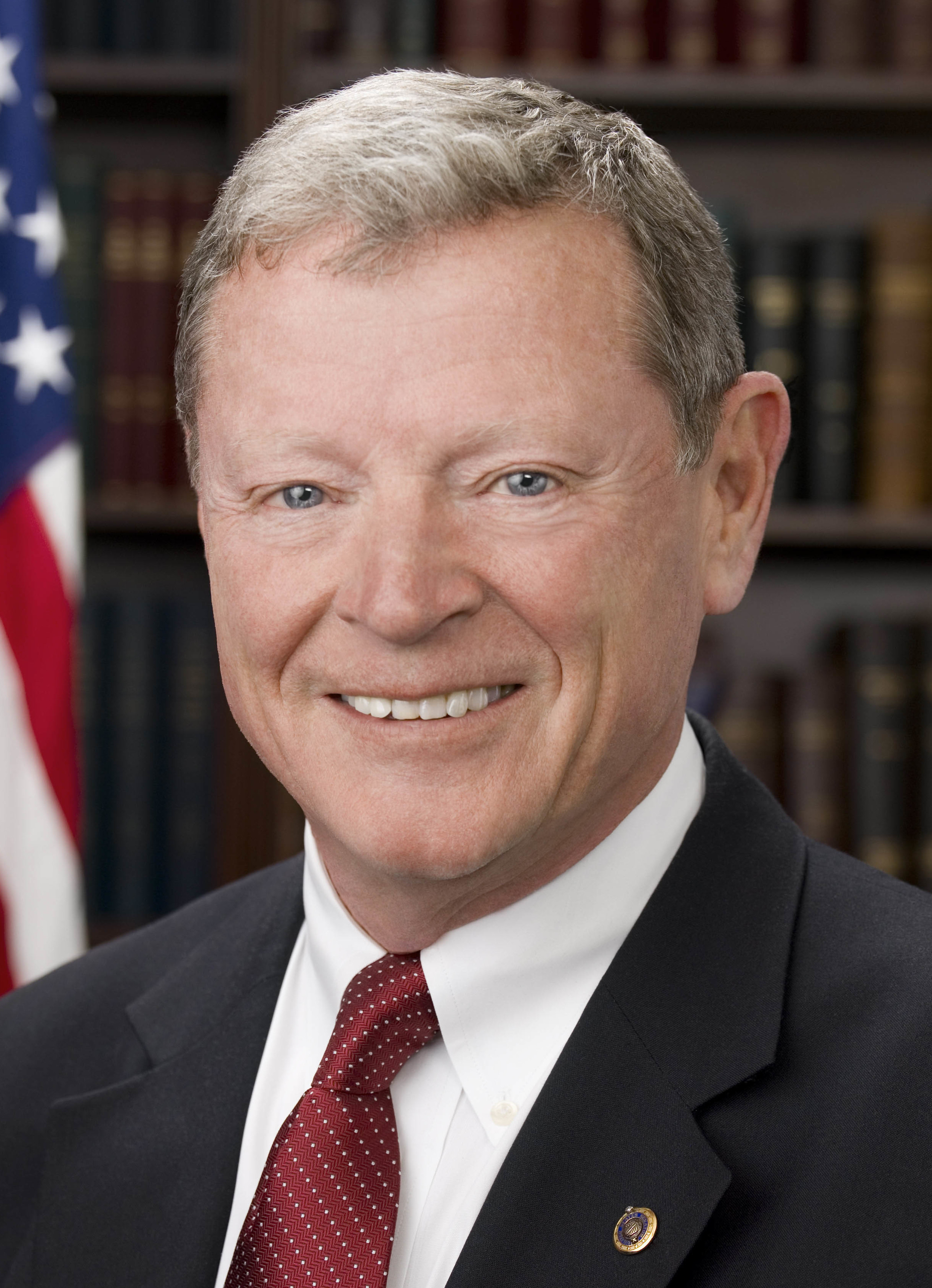

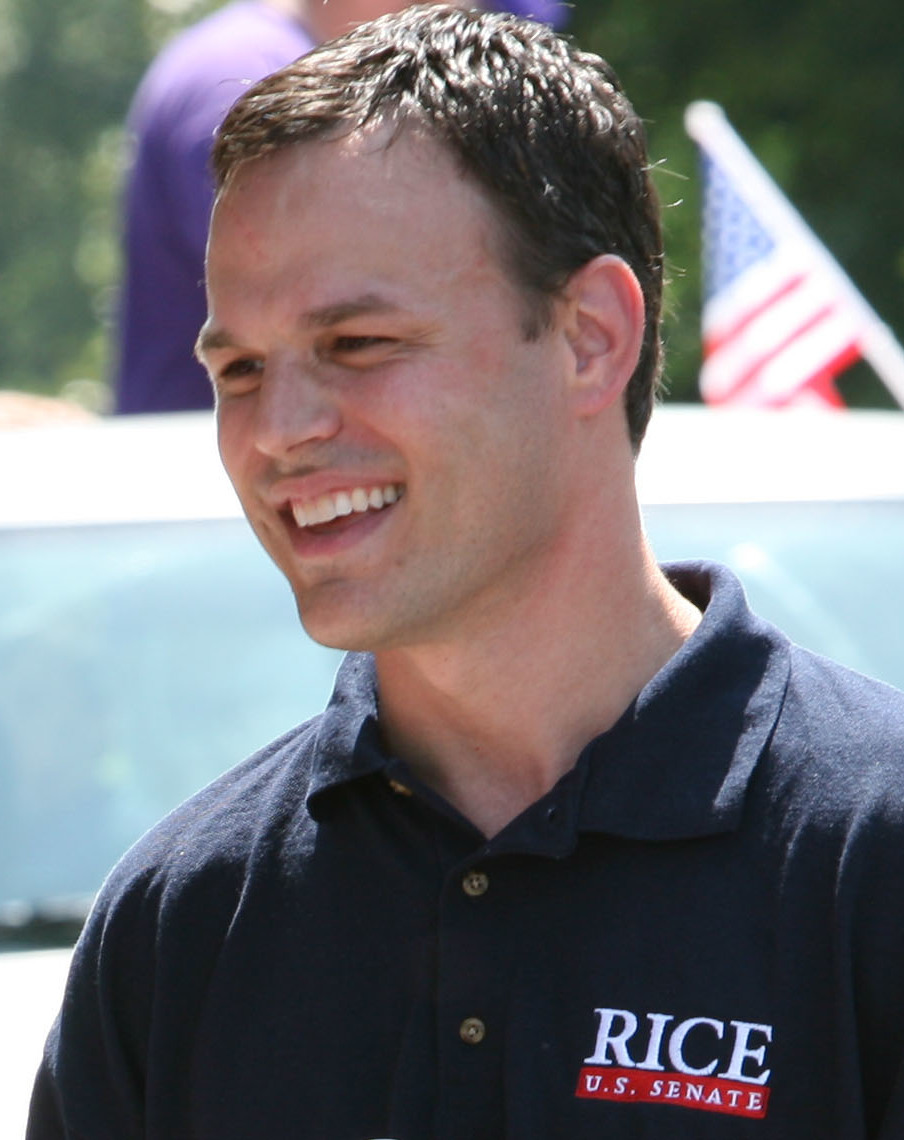
Nominee	Jim Inhofe	Andrew Rice
Party	Republican	Democratic
Popular vote	763,375	527,736
Percentage	56.68%	39.18%
- County results Inhofe: 40–50% 50–60% 60–70% 70–80% 80–90% Rice: 50–60%
U.S. senator before election
Jim Inhofe
Republican
Elected U.S. Senator
Jim Inhofe
Republican

The 2008 United States Senate election in Oklahoma was held on November 4, 2008. The statewide primary election was held July 29, with the run-off on August 26. Incumbent Republican U.S. Senator Jim Inhofe won re-election to a third term over Democrat Andrew Rice.

This was the last time a Democrat carried any counties in an Oklahoma U.S. Senate election until 2022, and until 2026 was the last time any Democrat did so in a regular Senate election. This was also the last Oklahoma U.S. Senate race until 2026 where the winner received less than 61% of votes.

== Republican primary ==
=== Candidates ===
- Jim Inhofe, incumbent U.S. Senator
- Dennis Lopez
- Evelyn Rogers
- Ted Ryals

=== Results ===
Republican primary results
Party	Candidate	Votes	%
Republican	Jim Inhofe (Incumbent)	116,371	84.18%
Republican	Evelyn Rogers	10,770	7.79%
Republican	Ted Ryals	7,306	5.28%
Republican	Dennis Lopez	3,800	2.75%
Total votes		138,247	100.00%

== Democratic primary ==
=== Background ===
Rice officially filed as a candidate for the United States Senate from Oklahoma on Monday, June 2, 2008. He won the Democratic primary against Jim Rogers, a retired schoolteacher who stressed campaign finance reform. As in earlier campaigns, Rogers refused to accept money to avoid any question of his allegiances. State Senator Kenneth Corn had earlier expressed interest in the race.

=== Candidates ===
- Andrew Rice, State Senator
- Jim Rogers

=== Results ===
Primary results by county: Rice—50–60% Rice—60–70% Rice—70–80% Rogers—50–60% Rogers—70–80%

Democratic primary results
Party	Candidate	Votes	%
Democratic	Andrew Rice	113,795	59.65%
Democratic	Jim Rogers	76,981	40.35%
Total votes		190,776	100.00%

== General election ==
=== Candidates ===
- Jim Inhofe (R), incumbent U.S. Senator
- Andrew Rice (D), State Senator
- Stephen Wallace (I), businessman

=== Campaign ===
Inhofe, who in August 2008 had a 61% approval rating, emphasized his conservative record and tried to label Rice as a "committed liberal." In the debates, Rice tried to connect Inhofe to George W. Bush saying "An era allowed this to happen. George Bush came into office eight years ago with a Republican majority and ... an agenda of radical deregulation." Rice also believed in climate change, something Inhofe is known for denying. In the election, Inhofe had over $5 million in the bank. Rice had $3.8 million.

=== Endorsements ===
Andrew Rice (D)

Individuals

- Wesley Clark, General, 2004 Democratic presidential candidate

=== Predictions ===
Source	Ranking	As of
The Cook Political Report	Likely R	October 23, 2008
CQ Politics	Likely R	October 31, 2008
Rothenberg Political Report	Safe R	November 2, 2008
Real Clear Politics	Safe R	November 4, 2008

=== Polling ===
Poll Source	Dates administered	Rice	Inhofe
Benenson Strategy Group	December 8–12, 2007	35%	49%
Tulsa World/KOTV/SoonerPoll	December 16–19, 2007	19%	60%
Research 2000/Daily Kos	June 9–11, 2008	31%	53%
KSWO	August 12–14, 2008	41%	50%
Survey USA	September 5–7, 2008	34%	56%
Rasmussen Reports	September 11, 2008	39%	55%
Survey USA	September 29, 2008	37%	53%
Survey USA	October 19, 2008	39%	51%
Survey USA	October 29, 2008	36%	56%

=== Results ===
United States Senate election in Oklahoma, 2008
Party	Candidate	Votes	%	±%
Republican	Jim Inhofe (Incumbent)	763,375	56.68%	−0.62%
Democratic	Andrew Rice	527,736	39.18%	+2.87%
Independent	Stephen Wallace	55,708	4.14%	
Majority		235,639	17.50%	−3.50%
Turnout		1,346,819		
Republican hold		Swing		

==== Counties that flipped from Democratic to Republican ====
- Atoka (Largest city: Atoka)
- Coal (Largest city: Coalgate)
- Bryan (Largest city: Durant)
- Johnston (Largest city: Tishomingo)
- Ottawa (Largest city: Miami)
- Harmon (Largest city: Hollis)
- Kiowa (Largest city: Hobart)
- Jefferson (Largest city: Waurika)
- Love (Largest city: Marietta)
- Murray (Largest city: Sulphur)
- Pushmataha (Largest city: Antlers)
- Choctaw (Largest city: Hugo)
- Le Flore (Largest city: Poteau)
- McCurtain (Largest city: Idabel)
- Hughes (Largest city: Holdenville)
- Seminole (Largest city: Seminole)
- Okfuskee (Largest city: Okemah)
- Latimer (Largest city: Wilburton)
- Pittsburg (Largest city: McAlester)
- Sequoyah (Largest city: Sallisaw)
- Haskell (Largest city: Stigler)

== See also ==
- 2008 United States Senate elections
