= List of United States senators from Oklahoma =

Oklahoma Senators

Current delegation

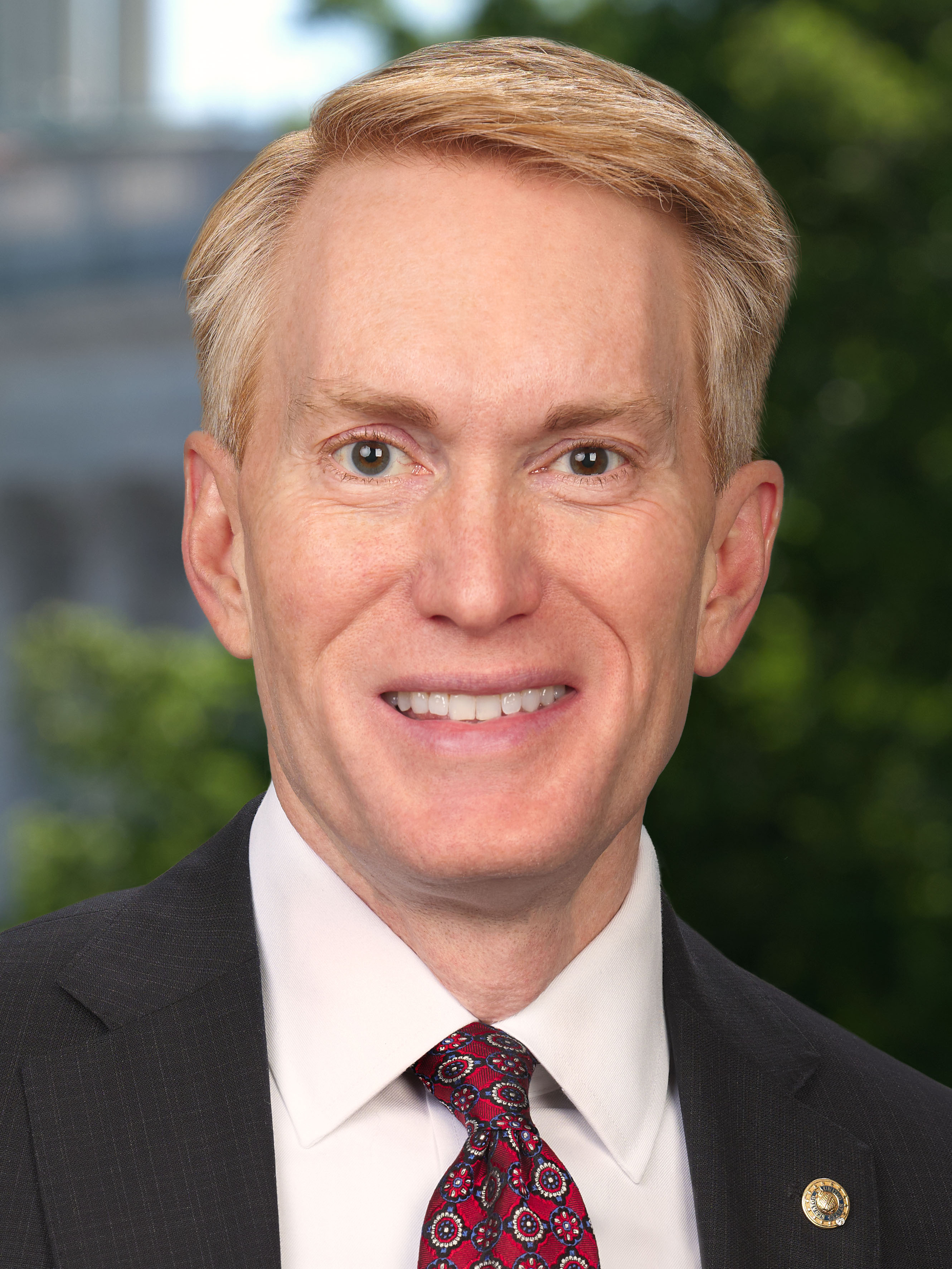
James Lankford (R)

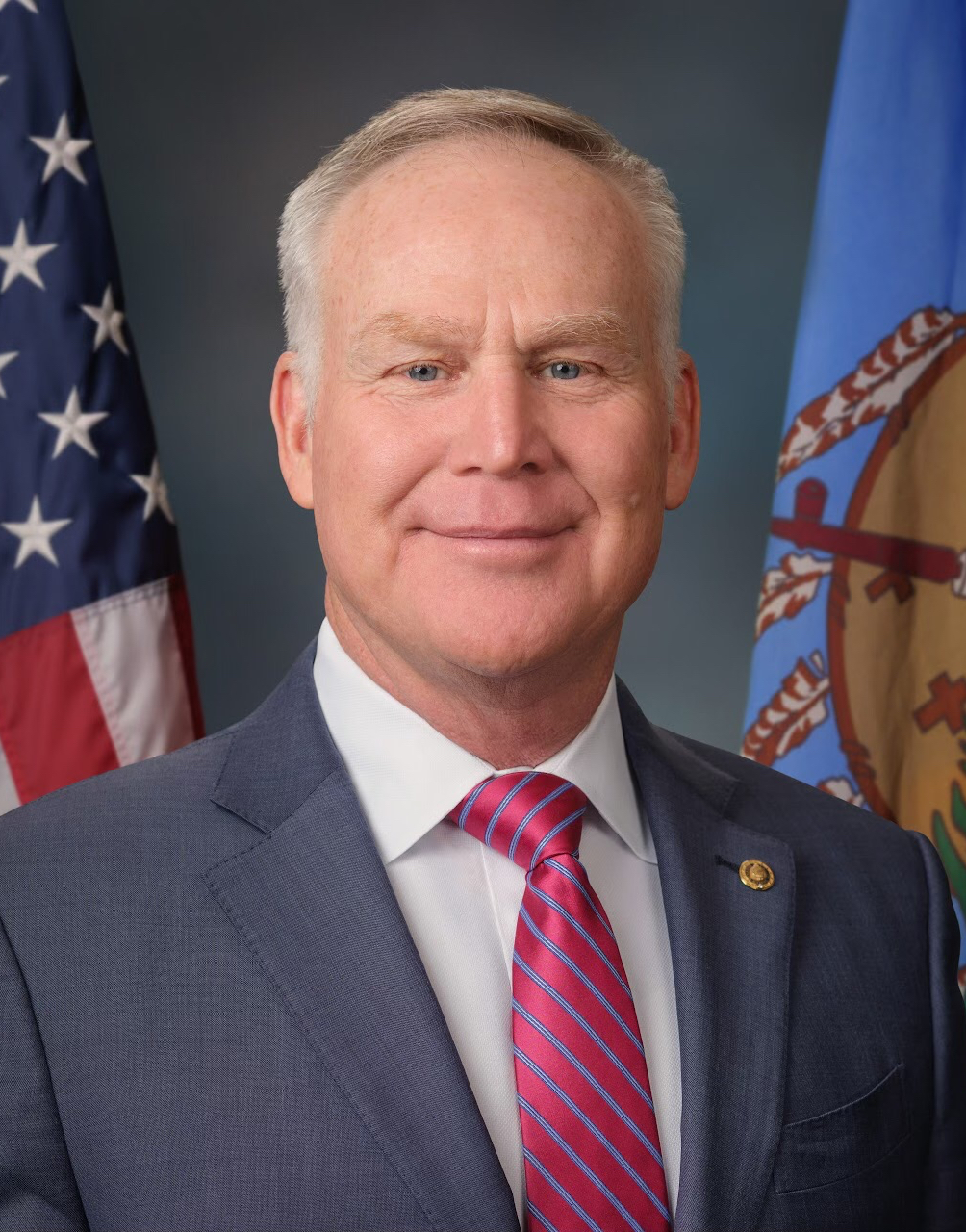
Alan Armstrong (R)

(ordered by seniority)

Oklahoma was admitted to the Union on November 16, 1907, and elects United States senators to class 2 and class 3. The state's current U.S. senators are Republican James Lankford (serving since 2015) and Republican Alan Armstrong (serving since 2026). Oklahoma's longest-serving senator was Jim Inhofe, who served from 1994 to 2023.

== List of senators ==
Class 2 Class 2 senators belong to the electoral cycle that most recently had regular elections in 2008, 2014, 2020, and 2026. The next election will be in 2032.						C	Class 3 Class 3 senators belong to the electoral cycle that most recently had regular elections in 2004, 2010, 2016, and 2022. The next election will be in 2028.					
#	Senator	Party	Dates in office	Electoral history	T	C	T	Electoral history	Dates in office	Party	Senator	#
Vacant			Nov 16, 1907 – Dec 11, 1907	Oklahoma did not elect its senators until one month after statehood.	1	60th	1	Oklahoma did not elect its senators until one month after statehood.	Nov 16, 1907 – Dec 11, 1907	Vacant		
1	Robert L. Owen (Muskogee)	Democratic	Dec 11, 1907 – Mar 4, 1925	Elected in 1907.	1	60th	1	Elected in 1907.	Dec 11, 1907 – Mar 4, 1921	Democratic	Thomas Gore (Lawton)	1
1	Robert L. Owen (Muskogee)	Democratic	Dec 11, 1907 – Mar 4, 1925	Elected in 1907.	1	61st	2	Re-elected in 1909.	Dec 11, 1907 – Mar 4, 1921	Democratic	Thomas Gore (Lawton)	1
1	Robert L. Owen (Muskogee)	Democratic	Dec 11, 1907 – Mar 4, 1925	Elected in 1907.	1	62nd	2	Re-elected in 1909.	Dec 11, 1907 – Mar 4, 1921	Democratic	Thomas Gore (Lawton)	1
1	Robert L. Owen (Muskogee)	Democratic	Dec 11, 1907 – Mar 4, 1925	Re-elected in 1913.	2	63rd	2	Re-elected in 1909.	Dec 11, 1907 – Mar 4, 1921	Democratic	Thomas Gore (Lawton)	1
1	Robert L. Owen (Muskogee)	Democratic	Dec 11, 1907 – Mar 4, 1925	Re-elected in 1913.	2	64th	3	Re-elected in 1914. Lost renomination.	Dec 11, 1907 – Mar 4, 1921	Democratic	Thomas Gore (Lawton)	1
1	Robert L. Owen (Muskogee)	Democratic	Dec 11, 1907 – Mar 4, 1925	Re-elected in 1913.	2	65th	3	Re-elected in 1914. Lost renomination.	Dec 11, 1907 – Mar 4, 1921	Democratic	Thomas Gore (Lawton)	1
1	Robert L. Owen (Muskogee)	Democratic	Dec 11, 1907 – Mar 4, 1925	Re-elected in 1918. Retired.	3	66th	3	Re-elected in 1914. Lost renomination.	Dec 11, 1907 – Mar 4, 1921	Democratic	Thomas Gore (Lawton)	1
1	Robert L. Owen (Muskogee)	Democratic	Dec 11, 1907 – Mar 4, 1925	Re-elected in 1918. Retired.	3	67th	4	Elected in 1920. Lost re-election.	Mar 4, 1921 – Mar 4, 1927	Republican	John W. Harreld (Oklahoma City)	2
1	Robert L. Owen (Muskogee)	Democratic	Dec 11, 1907 – Mar 4, 1925	Re-elected in 1918. Retired.	3	68th	4	Elected in 1920. Lost re-election.	Mar 4, 1921 – Mar 4, 1927	Republican	John W. Harreld (Oklahoma City)	2
2	William B. Pine (Okmulgee)	Republican	Mar 4, 1925 – Mar 4, 1931	Elected in 1924. Lost re-election.	4	69th	4	Elected in 1920. Lost re-election.	Mar 4, 1921 – Mar 4, 1927	Republican	John W. Harreld (Oklahoma City)	2
2	William B. Pine (Okmulgee)	Republican	Mar 4, 1925 – Mar 4, 1931	Elected in 1924. Lost re-election.	4	70th	5	Elected in 1926.	Mar 4, 1927 – Jan 3, 1951	Democratic	Elmer Thomas (Medicine Park)	3
2	William B. Pine (Okmulgee)	Republican	Mar 4, 1925 – Mar 4, 1931	Elected in 1924. Lost re-election.	4	71st	5	Elected in 1926.	Mar 4, 1927 – Jan 3, 1951	Democratic	Elmer Thomas (Medicine Park)	3
3	Thomas Gore (Oklahoma City)	Democratic	Mar 4, 1931 – Jan 3, 1937	Elected in 1930. Lost renomination.	5	72nd	5	Elected in 1926.	Mar 4, 1927 – Jan 3, 1951	Democratic	Elmer Thomas (Medicine Park)	3
3	Thomas Gore (Oklahoma City)	Democratic	Mar 4, 1931 – Jan 3, 1937	Elected in 1930. Lost renomination.	5	73rd	6	Re-elected in 1932.	Mar 4, 1927 – Jan 3, 1951	Democratic	Elmer Thomas (Medicine Park)	3
3	Thomas Gore (Oklahoma City)	Democratic	Mar 4, 1931 – Jan 3, 1937	Elected in 1930. Lost renomination.	5	74th	6	Re-elected in 1932.	Mar 4, 1927 – Jan 3, 1951	Democratic	Elmer Thomas (Medicine Park)	3
4	Joshua B. Lee (Norman)	Democratic	Jan 3, 1937 – Jan 3, 1943	Elected in 1936. Lost re-election.	6	75th	6	Re-elected in 1932.	Mar 4, 1927 – Jan 3, 1951	Democratic	Elmer Thomas (Medicine Park)	3
4	Joshua B. Lee (Norman)	Democratic	Jan 3, 1937 – Jan 3, 1943	Elected in 1936. Lost re-election.	6	76th	7	Re-elected in 1938.	Mar 4, 1927 – Jan 3, 1951	Democratic	Elmer Thomas (Medicine Park)	3
4	Joshua B. Lee (Norman)	Democratic	Jan 3, 1937 – Jan 3, 1943	Elected in 1936. Lost re-election.	6	77th	7	Re-elected in 1938.	Mar 4, 1927 – Jan 3, 1951	Democratic	Elmer Thomas (Medicine Park)	3
5	Edward H. Moore (Tulsa)	Republican	Jan 3, 1943 – Jan 3, 1949	Elected in 1942. Retired.	7	78th	7	Re-elected in 1938.	Mar 4, 1927 – Jan 3, 1951	Democratic	Elmer Thomas (Medicine Park)	3
5	Edward H. Moore (Tulsa)	Republican	Jan 3, 1943 – Jan 3, 1949	Elected in 1942. Retired.	7	79th	8	Re-elected in 1944. Lost renomination.	Mar 4, 1927 – Jan 3, 1951	Democratic	Elmer Thomas (Medicine Park)	3
5	Edward H. Moore (Tulsa)	Republican	Jan 3, 1943 – Jan 3, 1949	Elected in 1942. Retired.	7	80th	8	Re-elected in 1944. Lost renomination.	Mar 4, 1927 – Jan 3, 1951	Democratic	Elmer Thomas (Medicine Park)	3
6	Robert S. Kerr (Oklahoma City)	Democratic	Jan 3, 1949 – Jan 1, 1963	Elected in 1948.	8	81st	8	Re-elected in 1944. Lost renomination.	Mar 4, 1927 – Jan 3, 1951	Democratic	Elmer Thomas (Medicine Park)	3
6	Robert S. Kerr (Oklahoma City)	Democratic	Jan 3, 1949 – Jan 1, 1963	Elected in 1948.	8	82nd	9	Elected in 1950.	Jan 3, 1951 – Jan 3, 1969	Democratic	Mike Monroney (Oklahoma City)	4
6	Robert S. Kerr (Oklahoma City)	Democratic	Jan 3, 1949 – Jan 1, 1963	Elected in 1948.	8	83rd	9	Elected in 1950.	Jan 3, 1951 – Jan 3, 1969	Democratic	Mike Monroney (Oklahoma City)	4
6	Robert S. Kerr (Oklahoma City)	Democratic	Jan 3, 1949 – Jan 1, 1963	Re-elected in 1954.	9	84th	9	Elected in 1950.	Jan 3, 1951 – Jan 3, 1969	Democratic	Mike Monroney (Oklahoma City)	4
6	Robert S. Kerr (Oklahoma City)	Democratic	Jan 3, 1949 – Jan 1, 1963	Re-elected in 1954.	9	85th	10	Re-elected in 1956.	Jan 3, 1951 – Jan 3, 1969	Democratic	Mike Monroney (Oklahoma City)	4
6	Robert S. Kerr (Oklahoma City)	Democratic	Jan 3, 1949 – Jan 1, 1963	Re-elected in 1954.	9	86th	10	Re-elected in 1956.	Jan 3, 1951 – Jan 3, 1969	Democratic	Mike Monroney (Oklahoma City)	4
6	Robert S. Kerr (Oklahoma City)	Democratic	Jan 3, 1949 – Jan 1, 1963	Re-elected in 1960. Died.	10	87th	10	Re-elected in 1956.	Jan 3, 1951 – Jan 3, 1969	Democratic	Mike Monroney (Oklahoma City)	4
Vacant			Jan 1, 1963 – Jan 7, 1963		10	87th	10	Re-elected in 1956.	Jan 3, 1951 – Jan 3, 1969	Democratic	Mike Monroney (Oklahoma City)	4
Vacant			Jan 1, 1963 – Jan 7, 1963		10	88th	11	Re-elected in 1962. Lost re-election.	Jan 3, 1951 – Jan 3, 1969	Democratic	Mike Monroney (Oklahoma City)	4
7	J. Howard Edmondson (Oklahoma City)	Democratic	Jan 7, 1963 – Nov 3, 1964	Appointed to continue Kerr's term Lost nomination to finish Kerr's term.	10	88th	11	Re-elected in 1962. Lost re-election.	Jan 3, 1951 – Jan 3, 1969	Democratic	Mike Monroney (Oklahoma City)	4
8	Fred R. Harris (Lawton)	Democratic	Nov 3, 1964 – Jan 3, 1973	Elected to finish Kerr's term.	10	88th	11	Re-elected in 1962. Lost re-election.	Jan 3, 1951 – Jan 3, 1969	Democratic	Mike Monroney (Oklahoma City)	4
8	Fred R. Harris (Lawton)	Democratic	Nov 3, 1964 – Jan 3, 1973	Elected to finish Kerr's term.	10	89th	11	Re-elected in 1962. Lost re-election.	Jan 3, 1951 – Jan 3, 1969	Democratic	Mike Monroney (Oklahoma City)	4
8	Fred R. Harris (Lawton)	Democratic	Nov 3, 1964 – Jan 3, 1973	Re-elected in 1966. Retired.	11	90th	11	Re-elected in 1962. Lost re-election.	Jan 3, 1951 – Jan 3, 1969	Democratic	Mike Monroney (Oklahoma City)	4
8	Fred R. Harris (Lawton)	Democratic	Nov 3, 1964 – Jan 3, 1973	Re-elected in 1966. Retired.	11	91st	12	Elected in 1968.	Jan 3, 1969 – Jan 3, 1981	Republican	Henry Bellmon (Billings)	5
8	Fred R. Harris (Lawton)	Democratic	Nov 3, 1964 – Jan 3, 1973	Re-elected in 1966. Retired.	11	92nd	12	Elected in 1968.	Jan 3, 1969 – Jan 3, 1981	Republican	Henry Bellmon (Billings)	5
9	Dewey F. Bartlett (Tulsa)	Republican	Jan 3, 1973 – Jan 3, 1979	Elected in 1972. Retired.	12	93rd	12	Elected in 1968.	Jan 3, 1969 – Jan 3, 1981	Republican	Henry Bellmon (Billings)	5
9	Dewey F. Bartlett (Tulsa)	Republican	Jan 3, 1973 – Jan 3, 1979	Elected in 1972. Retired.	12	94th	13	Re-elected in 1974. Retired.	Jan 3, 1969 – Jan 3, 1981	Republican	Henry Bellmon (Billings)	5
9	Dewey F. Bartlett (Tulsa)	Republican	Jan 3, 1973 – Jan 3, 1979	Elected in 1972. Retired.	12	95th	13	Re-elected in 1974. Retired.	Jan 3, 1969 – Jan 3, 1981	Republican	Henry Bellmon (Billings)	5
10	David Boren (Seminole)	Democratic	Jan 3, 1979 – Nov 15, 1994	Elected in 1978.	13	96th	13	Re-elected in 1974. Retired.	Jan 3, 1969 – Jan 3, 1981	Republican	Henry Bellmon (Billings)	5
10	David Boren (Seminole)	Democratic	Jan 3, 1979 – Nov 15, 1994	Elected in 1978.	13	97th	14	Elected in 1980.	Jan 3, 1981 – Jan 3, 2005	Republican	Don Nickles (Ponca City)	6
10	David Boren (Seminole)	Democratic	Jan 3, 1979 – Nov 15, 1994	Elected in 1978.	13	98th	14	Elected in 1980.	Jan 3, 1981 – Jan 3, 2005	Republican	Don Nickles (Ponca City)	6
10	David Boren (Seminole)	Democratic	Jan 3, 1979 – Nov 15, 1994	Re-elected in 1984.	14	99th	14	Elected in 1980.	Jan 3, 1981 – Jan 3, 2005	Republican	Don Nickles (Ponca City)	6
10	David Boren (Seminole)	Democratic	Jan 3, 1979 – Nov 15, 1994	Re-elected in 1984.	14	100th	15	Re-elected in 1986.	Jan 3, 1981 – Jan 3, 2005	Republican	Don Nickles (Ponca City)	6
10	David Boren (Seminole)	Democratic	Jan 3, 1979 – Nov 15, 1994	Re-elected in 1984.	14	101st	15	Re-elected in 1986.	Jan 3, 1981 – Jan 3, 2005	Republican	Don Nickles (Ponca City)	6
10	David Boren (Seminole)	Democratic	Jan 3, 1979 – Nov 15, 1994	Re-elected in 1990. Resigned to become President of the University of Oklahoma.	15	102nd	15	Re-elected in 1986.	Jan 3, 1981 – Jan 3, 2005	Republican	Don Nickles (Ponca City)	6
10	David Boren (Seminole)	Democratic	Jan 3, 1979 – Nov 15, 1994	Re-elected in 1990. Resigned to become President of the University of Oklahoma.	15	103rd	16	Re-elected in 1992.	Jan 3, 1981 – Jan 3, 2005	Republican	Don Nickles (Ponca City)	6
Vacant			Nov 15, 1994 – Nov 17, 1994		15	103rd	16	Re-elected in 1992.	Jan 3, 1981 – Jan 3, 2005	Republican	Don Nickles (Ponca City)	6
11	Jim Inhofe (Tulsa)	Republican	Nov 17, 1994 – Jan 3, 2023	Elected in 1994 to finish Boren's term.	15	103rd	16	Re-elected in 1992.	Jan 3, 1981 – Jan 3, 2005	Republican	Don Nickles (Ponca City)	6
11	Jim Inhofe (Tulsa)	Republican	Nov 17, 1994 – Jan 3, 2023	Elected in 1994 to finish Boren's term.	15	104th	16	Re-elected in 1992.	Jan 3, 1981 – Jan 3, 2005	Republican	Don Nickles (Ponca City)	6
11	Jim Inhofe (Tulsa)	Republican	Nov 17, 1994 – Jan 3, 2023	Re-elected in 1996.	16	105th	16	Re-elected in 1992.	Jan 3, 1981 – Jan 3, 2005	Republican	Don Nickles (Ponca City)	6
11	Jim Inhofe (Tulsa)	Republican	Nov 17, 1994 – Jan 3, 2023	Re-elected in 1996.	16	106th	17	Re-elected in 1998. Retired.	Jan 3, 1981 – Jan 3, 2005	Republican	Don Nickles (Ponca City)	6
11	Jim Inhofe (Tulsa)	Republican	Nov 17, 1994 – Jan 3, 2023	Re-elected in 1996.	16	107th	17	Re-elected in 1998. Retired.	Jan 3, 1981 – Jan 3, 2005	Republican	Don Nickles (Ponca City)	6
11	Jim Inhofe (Tulsa)	Republican	Nov 17, 1994 – Jan 3, 2023	Re-elected in 2002.	17	108th	17	Re-elected in 1998. Retired.	Jan 3, 1981 – Jan 3, 2005	Republican	Don Nickles (Ponca City)	6
11	Jim Inhofe (Tulsa)	Republican	Nov 17, 1994 – Jan 3, 2023	Re-elected in 2002.	17	109th	18	Elected in 2004.	Jan 3, 2005 – Jan 3, 2015	Republican	Tom Coburn (Muskogee)	7
11	Jim Inhofe (Tulsa)	Republican	Nov 17, 1994 – Jan 3, 2023	Re-elected in 2002.	17	110th	18	Elected in 2004.	Jan 3, 2005 – Jan 3, 2015	Republican	Tom Coburn (Muskogee)	7
11	Jim Inhofe (Tulsa)	Republican	Nov 17, 1994 – Jan 3, 2023	Re-elected in 2008.	18	111th	18	Elected in 2004.	Jan 3, 2005 – Jan 3, 2015	Republican	Tom Coburn (Muskogee)	7
11	Jim Inhofe (Tulsa)	Republican	Nov 17, 1994 – Jan 3, 2023	Re-elected in 2008.	18	112th	19	Re-elected in 2010. Resigned.	Jan 3, 2005 – Jan 3, 2015	Republican	Tom Coburn (Muskogee)	7
11	Jim Inhofe (Tulsa)	Republican	Nov 17, 1994 – Jan 3, 2023	Re-elected in 2008.	18	113th	19	Re-elected in 2010. Resigned.	Jan 3, 2005 – Jan 3, 2015	Republican	Tom Coburn (Muskogee)	7
11	Jim Inhofe (Tulsa)	Republican	Nov 17, 1994 – Jan 3, 2023	Re-elected in 2014.	19	114th	19	Elected in 2014 to finish Coburn's term.	Jan 3, 2015 – present	Republican	James Lankford (Oklahoma City)	8
11	Jim Inhofe (Tulsa)	Republican	Nov 17, 1994 – Jan 3, 2023	Re-elected in 2014.	19	115th	20	Re-elected in 2016.	Jan 3, 2015 – present	Republican	James Lankford (Oklahoma City)	8
11	Jim Inhofe (Tulsa)	Republican	Nov 17, 1994 – Jan 3, 2023	Re-elected in 2014.	19	116th	20	Re-elected in 2016.	Jan 3, 2015 – present	Republican	James Lankford (Oklahoma City)	8
11	Jim Inhofe (Tulsa)	Republican	Nov 17, 1994 – Jan 3, 2023	Re-elected in 2020. Resigned.	20	117th	20	Re-elected in 2016.	Jan 3, 2015 – present	Republican	James Lankford (Oklahoma City)	8
12	Markwayne Mullin (Westville)	Republican	Jan 3, 2023 – Mar 23, 2026	Elected in 2022 to finish Inhofe's term. Resigned to become U.S. Secretary of Homeland Security.	20	118th	21	Re-elected in 2022.	Jan 3, 2015 – present	Republican	James Lankford (Oklahoma City)	8
12	Markwayne Mullin (Westville)	Republican	Jan 3, 2023 – Mar 23, 2026	Elected in 2022 to finish Inhofe's term. Resigned to become U.S. Secretary of Homeland Security.	20	119th	21	Re-elected in 2022.	Jan 3, 2015 – present	Republican	James Lankford (Oklahoma City)	8
13	Alan Armstrong (Tulsa)	Republican	Mar 24, 2026 – present	Appointed to finish Inhofe's term. Ineligible to run for full term. Resigning early to give his elected successor preferential seniority.	20	119th	21	Re-elected in 2022.	Jan 3, 2015 – present	Republican	James Lankford (Oklahoma City)	8
14	Kevin Hern (elect) (Tulsa)	Republican	Taking office Nov 30, 2026	Appointed early to finish Inhofe's term, having been already elected to the next term.	20	119th	21	Re-elected in 2022.	Jan 3, 2015 – present	Republican	James Lankford (Oklahoma City)	8
14	Kevin Hern (elect) (Tulsa)	Republican	Taking office Nov 30, 2026	Elected in 2026.	21	120th	21	Re-elected in 2022.	Jan 3, 2015 – present	Republican	James Lankford (Oklahoma City)	8
14	Kevin Hern (elect) (Tulsa)	Republican	Taking office Nov 30, 2026	Elected in 2026.	21	121st	22	To be determined in the 2028 election.				
14	Kevin Hern (elect) (Tulsa)	Republican	Taking office Nov 30, 2026	Elected in 2026.	21	122nd	22	To be determined in the 2028 election.				
To be determined in the 2032 election.					22	123rd	22	To be determined in the 2028 election.				

== See also ==
- Elections in Oklahoma
- List of United States representatives from Oklahoma
- Oklahoma's congressional delegations
