= Fletcher B. Swank =

American politician

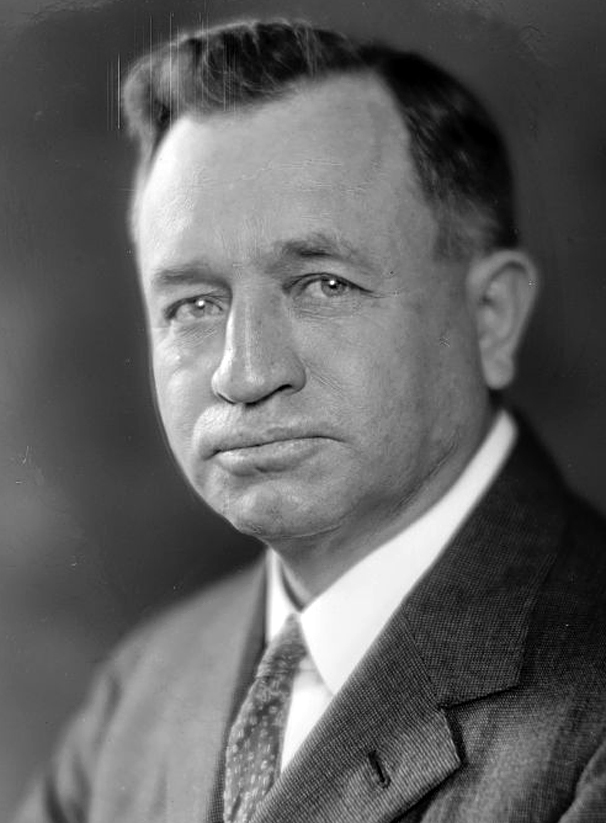

Member of the U.S. House of Representatives from Oklahoma's 5th district
- In office March 4, 1921 – March 3, 1929
- Preceded by: John W. Harreld
- Succeeded by: Ulysses S. Stone
- In office March 4, 1931 – January 3, 1935
- Preceded by: Ulysses S. Stone
- Succeeded by: Joshua B. Lee

Personal details
- Born: April 24, 1875 Bloomfield, Iowa
- Died: March 16, 1950 (aged 74) Norman, Oklahoma
- Citizenship: American
- Party: Democratic Party
- Spouse: Ada Blake Swank
- Children: 2
- Education: University of Oklahoma; Cumberland University
- Profession: teacher; school superintendent; Attorney; politician; judge

Fletcher B. Swank (April 24, 1875 – March 16, 1950) was an American politician and a U.S. representative from Oklahoma.

== Biography ==
Born near Bloomfield, Iowa, Swank was the son of Wallace and Melinda Wells Swank. He moved with his parents to Beef Creek, Indian Territory, in 1888, and attended an academy in Noble, Oklahoma, and University of Oklahoma in Norman. He married Ada Blake on December 30, 1914; and the couple had two children, Fletcher B. and James Wallace.

== Career ==
Swank taught school at Stella, and in 1902 he was elected Cleveland County school superintendent, serving from 1903 to 1907. Swank became Private secretary to Congressman Scott Ferris in 1907 and 1908. He attended the law department of Georgetown University, Washington, D.C., in 1907 and 1908, and was graduated from Cumberland University, Lebanon, Tennessee, in 1909. Admitted to the bar in 1909, he commenced practice in Norman, Oklahoma. He served as judge of the county court of Cleveland County, Oklahoma, from 1911 to 1915, and as judge of the fourteenth judicial district of Oklahoma from 1915 to September 1920, when he resigned.

Swank was elected as a Democrat to the Sixty-seventh and to the three succeeding Congresses serving from March 4, 1921, to March 3, 1929. An unsuccessful candidate for reelection in 1928 to the Seventy-first Congress, (Note: He lost his seat in 1928 to the Republican candidate, U.S. Stone. District voters returned him to the same office in 1930.) He was elected to the Seventy-second and Seventy-third Congresses, and served from March 4, 1931, to January 3, 1935. He was an unsuccessful candidate for renomination in 1934, losing to Josh Lee. He ran again in 1936, 1937 and 1938, but with no success, He then returned to Norman and resumed his law practice.

== Death ==
Swank died in Norman, Cleveland County, Oklahoma, on March 16, 1950 (age 74 years, 326 days). He is interred at Odd Fellows Cemetery, Norman, Oklahoma.

== Notes ==
U.S. House of Representatives
Preceded by John W. Harreld	Member of the U.S. House of Representatives from Oklahoma's 5th congressional district 1921–1929	Succeeded by Ulysses S. Stone
Preceded by Ulysses S. Stone	Member of the U.S. House of Representatives from Oklahoma's 5th congressional district 1931–1935	Succeeded by Joshua B. Lee
