= Elmer Thomas =

American politician (1876–1965)

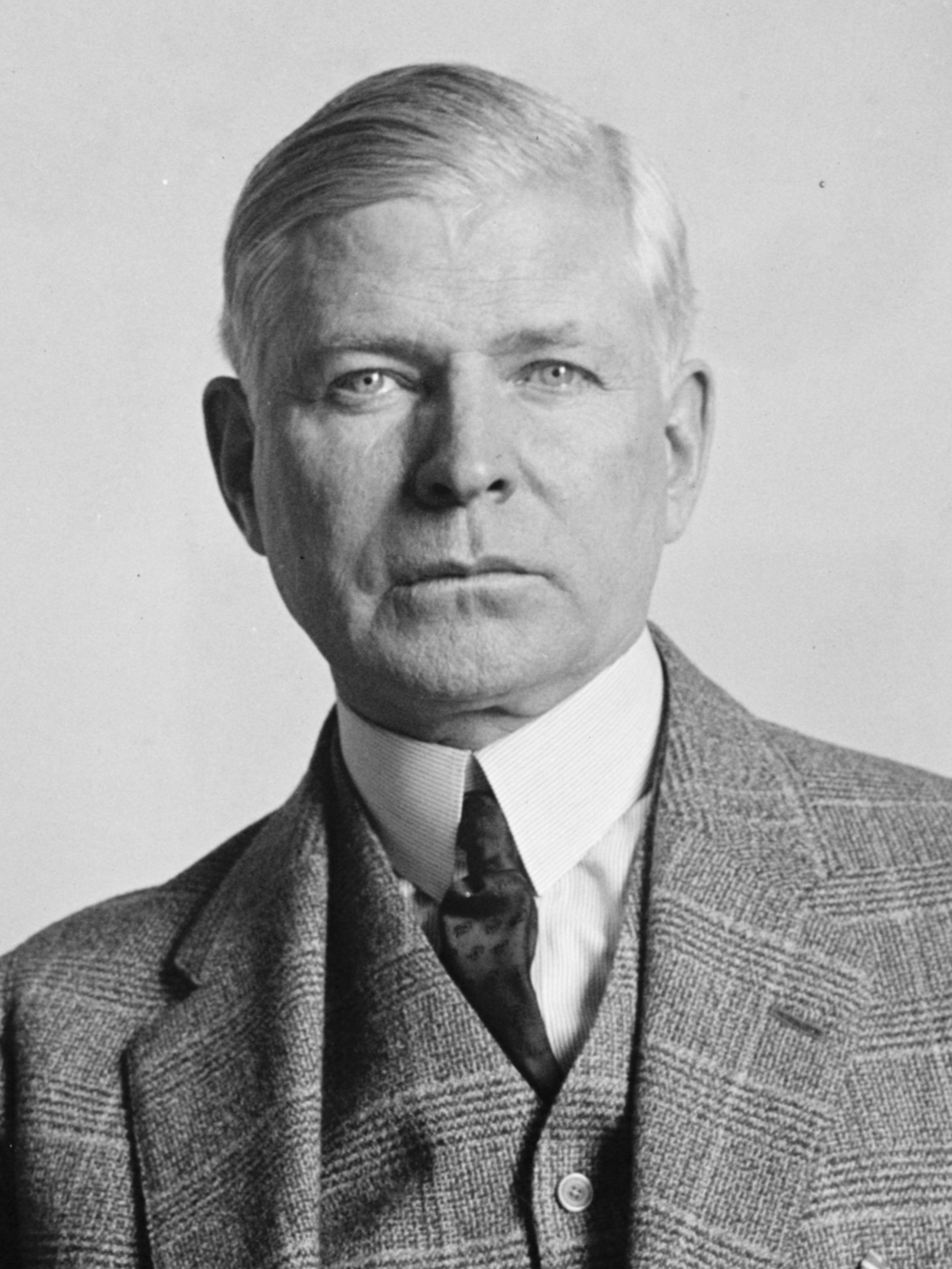
- Thomas in 1926

United States Senator from Oklahoma
- In office March 4, 1927 – January 3, 1951
- Preceded by: John W. Harreld
- Succeeded by: Mike Monroney

Member of the U.S. House of Representatives from Oklahoma's 6th district
- In office March 4, 1923 – March 3, 1927
- Preceded by: L.M. Gensman
- Succeeded by: Jed Johnson

3rd President pro tempore of the Oklahoma Senate
- In office 1911–1913
- Preceded by: J. C. Graham
- Succeeded by: C. B. Kendrick

Member of the Oklahoma Senate from the 17th district
- In office 1907–1920
- Preceded by: Position established
- Succeeded by: Jed Johnson

Personal details
- Born: John William Elmer Thomas; September 8, 1876 Greencastle, Indiana, US
- Died: September 19, 1965 (aged 89) Lawton, Oklahoma, US
- Resting place: Highland Cemetery; 34°37′56″N 98°24′1″W
- Party: Democratic
- Spouse: Edith Smith
- Education: Central Normal College; DePauw University
- Profession: Lawyer

John William Elmer Thomas (September 8, 1876 – September 19, 1965) was a native of Indiana who moved to Oklahoma Territory in 1901, where he practiced law in Lawton. After statehood, he was elected to the first state senate, representing the Lawton area. In 1922, he ran successfully on the Democratic Party ticket for the U.S. House of Representatives from Oklahoma. He was the Democratic nominee for the U.S. Senate in 1926; he won this race and held the seat until 1950, when he lost the party nomination to Mike Monroney. Thomas returned to a private law practice in Washington, D.C., and in 1957 moved his practice back to Lawton, where he died in 1965.

== Early life ==
Born on a farm in Putnam County, Indiana, near Greencastle, to William and Elizabeth Thomas on September 8, 1876, he attended the common schools; graduated from the Central Normal College (now Canterbury College), Danville, Indiana, in 1897 and from the graduate department of DePauw University, Greencastle, Indiana, in 1900. Thomas studied law, was admitted to the Indiana bar in 1897 and to the Oklahoma bar in 1900, and commenced practice in Oklahoma City, Oklahoma; moved to Lawton, Oklahoma, in 1901 and continued the practice of law.

== Political career ==
=== Oklahoma state politics ===
He was elected a member of the first state senate in 1907, where he served until 1920. He also served as president pro tempore 1910–1913, founded the Medicine Park Resort and oversaw the state's first fish hatchery at Medicine Park, Oklahoma. He was an unsuccessful candidate for election in 1920 to the 67th Congress. In 1922, he ran again and won, elected as a Democrat to the 68th and 69th Congresses (March 4, 1923–March 3, 1927). As a member of the Oklahoma delegation to the House of Representatives, he supported Indian education legislation, the McNary-Haugen Farm Bill and legislation expanding credit for farmers. He also served on the House Committee on Public Lands and Claims

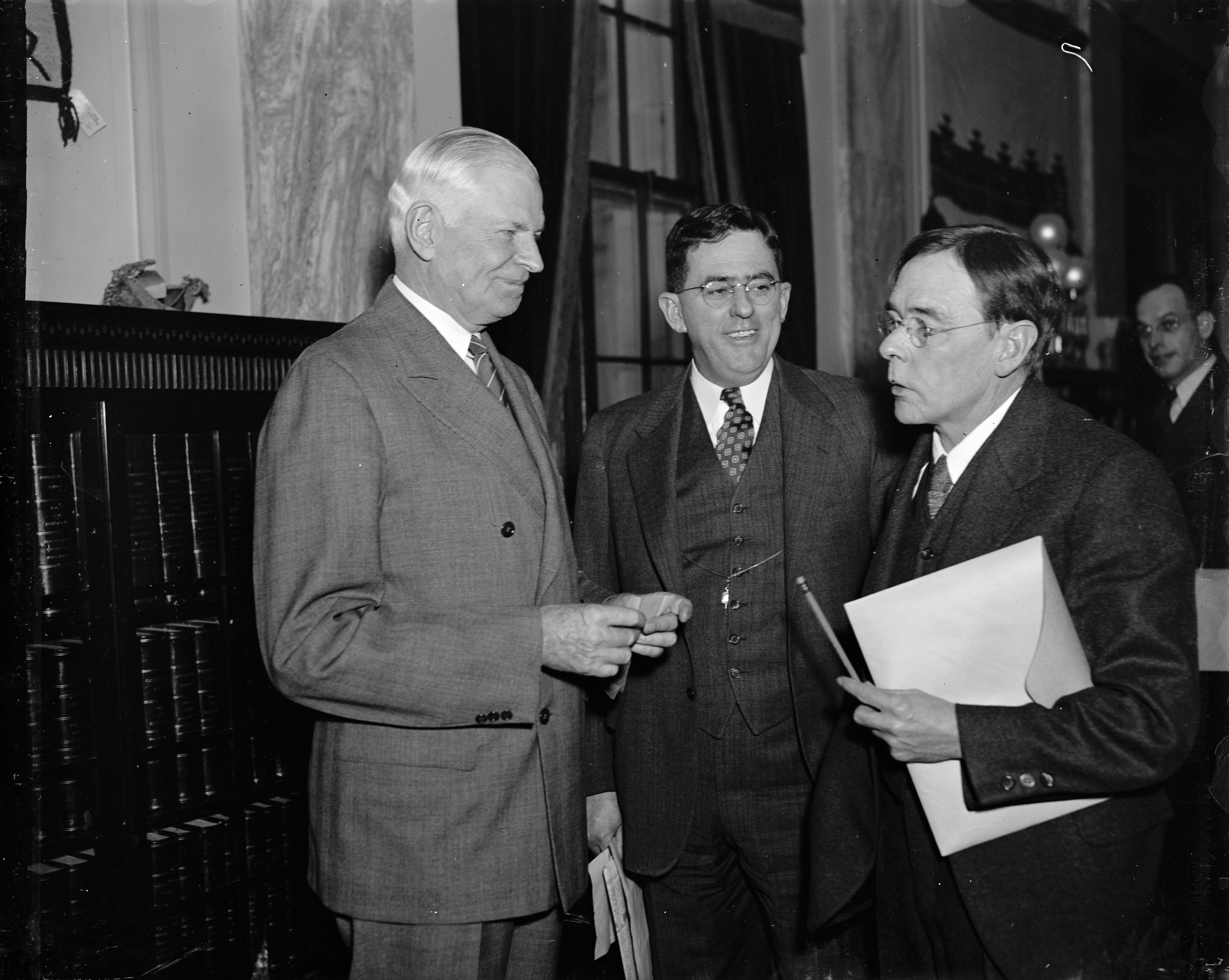
Elmer Thomas (left), with Claude M. Hirst, and John Collier

=== National politics ===
Elmer Thomas was not a candidate for renomination in 1926, having become a candidate for United States Senator; elected as a Democrat to the United States Senate in 1926, defeating former governor Jack Walton. He attacked the Calvin Coolidge administration as insensitive to farmers, then reluctantly backed Herbert Hoover's Agricultural Marketing Act of 1929, and supported paying the Veteran's Bonus. He was reelected in 1932, he actively supported Franklin D. Roosevelt and the New Deal. Specifically, Senator Thomas proposed an amendment known as the Thomas Amendment, to the Agricultural Adjustment Act, intended to help farmers financially by empowering the president to reduce the gold backing for dollars and to print bills backed by silver alone when cash became depressively tight. Lewis Douglas, Roosevelt's budget director, was furious about this threat to the gold standard, and in its final form the amendment was weaker. Thomas was also a reliable friend to Indians and served as chairman of the Committee on Indian Affairs between 1935 and 1944.

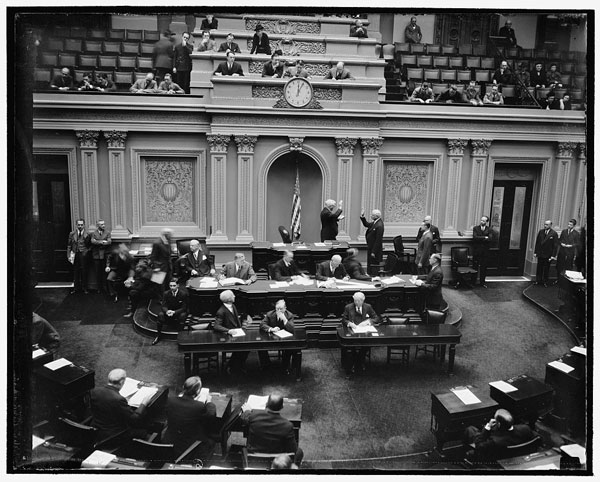
Elmer Thomas (right-center, facing left, with right hand raised) is sworn into the U.S. Senate by then-Vice President John N. Garner in January 1939 after being re-elected in 1938.

Roosevelt visited Oklahoma in 1938 and campaigned for Senator Thomas's reelection. Thomas won handily. He was very interested in international affairs, having supported the League of Nations, the Kellogg-Briand Peace Pact, and the World Court. He voted for neutrality in 1935 and 1937, but said his main concern was American military preparedness. He had served in the Army as a lieutenant colonel assigned to military intelligence and retained that rank as a member of the Reserves.

In June 1938, he became chair of the Sub-Committee on Military Appropriations, and after inspecting numerous bases found the country's defenses "in critical condition." During World War II his subcommittee secured funding for the top-secret atomic bomb project. He was one of just seven lawmakers who were enlisted in 1944 by top Roosevelt officials including the War Secretary, Henry L. Stimson, to help conceal around $800 million in the military spending bill passing through Congress. In his memoir, "Forty Years a Legislator," Thomas recalled that Stimson told him and three other senators in a secret meeting in the Capitol that "in the event the German government was able to develop the energy first, the war would soon be over for the reason that no nation could stand the impact of such terrific force."

Senator Thomas was reelected in 1944, becoming the third-ranking senator in seniority. He chaired the Committee on Agriculture and Forestry from 1944 to 1946 and 1949 to 1950. He attended food conferences in Quebec and Copenhagen in 1945 and 1946 and toured Europe in 1949 as part of an audit of Marshall Plan funds.

=== End of political career ===
Thomas was challenged in the Democratic primary by A.S. "Mike" Monroney in 1950. This time Thomas lost his bid for the nomination, and gave up his seat to Monroney in January 1951. In 1953, he published "Financial Engineering" regarding the planning and management of financial systems. In semi-retirement, he engaged in the practice of law in Washington, D.C., until August 1957, then returned to Lawton, Oklahoma, where he died September 19, 1965. He was interred in Highland Cemetery in Lawton.

== Honors ==
Elmer Thomas was inducted into the Oklahoma Hall of Fame in 1932.

== Elmer Thomas Lake ==
Senator Thomas was behind the creation of Medicine Park, situated in the Wichita Mountains of Oklahoma. A lake named after the senator lies to the west of the town, just northwest of Lawton. It has 8 miles (13 km) of shoreline and 334 acres (1.4 km^{2}).

== Secret Funding of the Manhattan Project ==
During World War II Thomas was an Appropriator on the Senate Appropriations Subcommittee on Military Spending and was involved in both appropriating the funds for the Manhattan Project and keeping the funding secret. As such he was privy to early estimates of the power of an atomic bomb. Thomas later wrote a memoir describing his role.

Party political offices
Preceded by Scott Ferris	Democratic nominee for U.S. Senator from Oklahoma (Class 3); 1926, 1932, 1938, 1944	Succeeded by Mike Monroney
U.S. House of Representatives
Preceded by L.M. Gensman	Member of the U.S. House of Representatives from Oklahoma's 6th congressional district March 4, 1923–March 3, 1927	Succeeded by Jed Johnson
U.S. Senate
Preceded by John W. Harreld	U.S. senator (Class 3) from Oklahoma; March 4, 1927–January 3, 1951; Served alongside: William B. Pine, Thomas Gore, Joshua B. Lee, Edward H. Moore, Robert S. Kerr	Succeeded by A. S. Mike Monroney
Preceded by Burton K. Wheeler	Chair of the Senate Indian Affairs Committee; 1936–1945	Succeeded by Joseph C. O'Mahoney
Preceded by Ellison D. Smith	Chair of the Senate Agriculture Committee; 1945–1947	Succeeded by Arthur Capper
Preceded by Arthur Capper	Ranking Member of the Senate Agriculture Committee; 1947–1949	Succeeded by George Aiken
Preceded by Arthur Capper	Chair of the Senate Agriculture Committee; 1949–1951	Succeeded by Allen J. Ellender
