= 1950 United States Senate election in Oklahoma =

- November 7, 1950
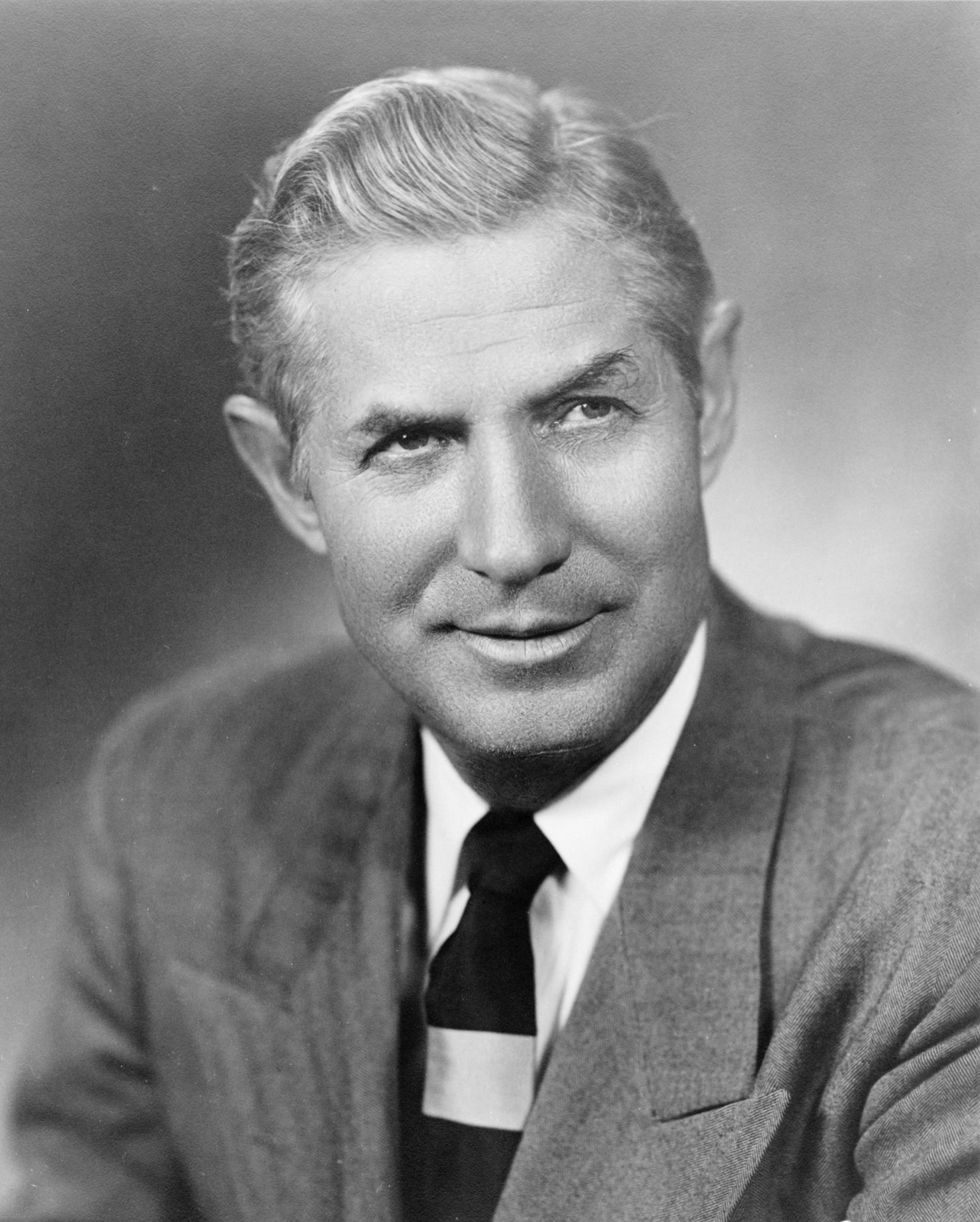

Nominee	Mike Monroney	Bill Alexander
Party	Democratic	Republican
Popular vote	345,953	285,224
Percentage	54.81%	45.19%
- County results Monroney: 50–60% 60–70% 70–80% 80–90% Alexander: 50–60% 60–70%
U.S. senator before election
Elmer Thomas
Democratic
Elected U.S. Senator
Mike Monroney
Democratic

The 1950 United States Senate election in Oklahoma took place on November 7, 1950. Incumbent Democratic Senator Elmer Thomas ran for re-election to a fifth term. However, though he had successfully beat back primary challengers in past elections, he was ultimately defeated by Congressman Mike Monroney. Monroney advanced to the general election, where he faced Reverend Bill Alexander, the Republican nominee. Despite the national Republican landslide, Monroney defeated Alexander by a wide margin, holding the seat for the Democratic Party.

== Democratic primary ==
=== Candidates ===
- J.R. Champ Clarke
- Bill Edwards
- C. A. Gentry
- Mike Monroney, U.S. Representative from Oklahoma City
- Robert Teeter
- Elmer Thomas, incumbent U.S. Senator since 1927
- Joe B. Thompson

=== Results ===
Democratic primary
Party	Candidate	Votes	%
Democratic	Mike Monroney	210,557	46.54%
Democratic	Elmer Thomas (inc.)	195,904	43.30%
Democratic	Joe B. Thompson	16,094	3.56%
Democratic	Bill Edwards	10,571	2.34%
Democratic	C. A. Gentry	8,318	1.84%
Democratic	J. R. Champ Clarke	6,462	1.43%
Democratic	Robert Teeter	4,509	1.00%
Total votes		452,415	100.00%

=== Runoff election results ===
Democratic primary runoff
Party	Candidate	Votes	%
Democratic	Mike Monroney	240,432	52.95%
Democratic	Elmer Thomas (inc.)	213,665	47.05%
Total votes		454,097	100.00%

== Republican primary ==
=== Candidates ===
- Bill Alexander, pastor of First Christian Church of Oklahoma
- Raymond H. Fields, newspaperman
- George T. Balch
- Forrest Van Pelt

=== Results ===
Republican primary
Party	Candidate	Votes	%
Republican	Bill Alexander	37,655	64.90%
Republican	Raymond H. Fields	13,398	23.09%
Republican	George T. Balch	4,746	8.18%
Republican	Forrest Van Pelt	2,220	3.83%
Total votes		58,079	100.00%

== General election ==
=== Results ===
1950 United States Senate election in Oklahoma
Party	Candidate	Votes	%	±%
Democratic	Mike Monroney	345,953	54.81%	−0.83%
Republican	Bill Alexander	285,224	45.19%	+1.17%
Majority		60,729	9.62%	−2.00%
Turnout		631,177		
Democratic hold				
