= John W. Harreld =

American politician

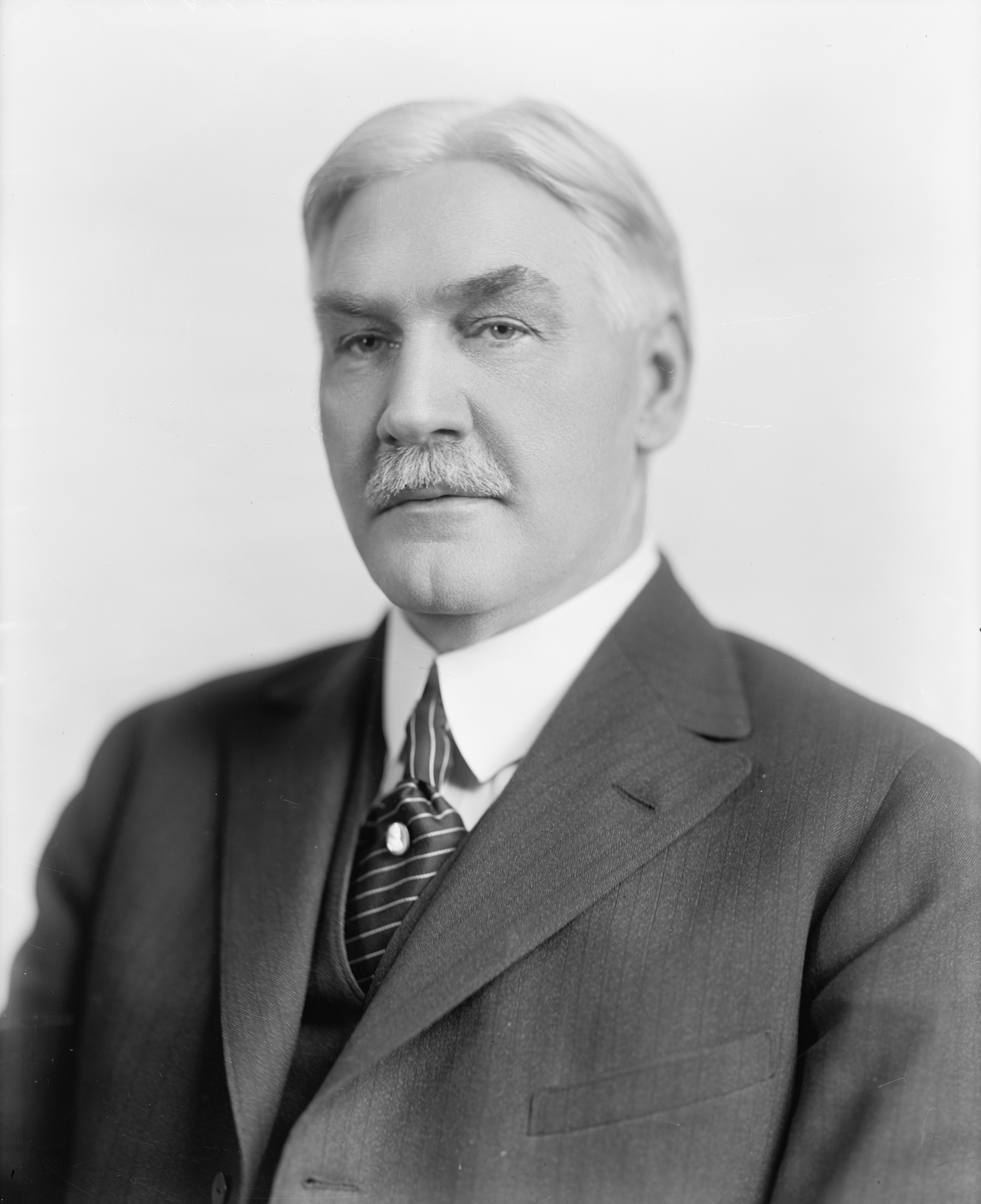

United States Senator from Oklahoma
- In office March 4, 1921 – March 4, 1927
- Preceded by: Thomas Gore
- Succeeded by: Elmer Thomas

Member of the U.S. House of Representatives from Oklahoma's 5th district
- In office November 8, 1919 – March 4, 1921
- Preceded by: Joseph Bryan Thompson
- Succeeded by: Fletcher B. Swank

Personal details
- Born: John William Harreld; January 24, 1872 Butler County, Kentucky
- Died: December 26, 1950 (aged 78) Oklahoma City, Oklahoma
- Party: Republican
- Spouses: Laura Ward; Thurlow Ward
- Education: Bryant & Stratton Business College, Louisville, Kentucky

John William Harreld (January 24, 1872 – December 26, 1950) was a United States representative and senator from Oklahoma. Harreld was the first Republican senator elected in Oklahoma and represented a shift in Oklahoma politics.

== Early life and career ==
Harreld was born in Butler County, Kentucky, near Morgantown to Martha Helm and Thomas Nelson Harreld. He attended public schools, the normal school at Lebanon, Ohio, and Bryant & Stratton Business College of Louisville, Kentucky, where he taught while studying law. Admitted to the bar in 1889, he begin his practice in Morgantown. He was prosecuting attorney of Butler County from 1892 to 1896. After marrying Laura Ward on October 20, 1889, and having a son, Ward, he moved to Ardmore, Oklahoma, in 1906. He was a referee in bankruptcy from 1908 to 1915, when he resigned to become an executive with an oil corporation. He moved to Oklahoma City in 1917 and engaged in the production of oil and continued the practice of law. After his first wife's death, he married his wife's sister, Thurlow Ward, in 1931.

== Political career ==
Harreld was elected, on November 8, 1919, as a Republican to the Sixty-sixth Congress to fill the vacancy caused by the death of Joseph B. Thompson and served from November 8, 1919, to March 4, 1921. He was not a candidate for renomination, having become a candidate for the Republican nomination for U.S. Senator; he was elected to the Senate in 1920 and served from March 4, 1921, to March 4, 1927; he was an unsuccessful candidate for reelection in 1926. He served as Senate chairman of the Committee on Indian Affairs. He was an unsuccessful candidate for election in 1940 to the Seventy-seventh Congress and returned to Oklahoma City, where he continued the practice of law and his interest in the oil business.

He died in Oklahoma City, Oklahoma, in 1950, and was interred in Fairlawn Cemetery in Oklahoma City.

Party political offices
| Preceded by John H. Burford | Republican nominee for United States Senator from Oklahoma (Class 3); 1920, 1926 | Succeeded by Wirt Franklin |
U.S. House of Representatives
| Preceded by Joseph Bryan Thompson | Member of the U.S. House of Representatives from Oklahoma's 5th congressional district 1919–1921 | Succeeded by Fletcher B. Swank |
U.S. Senate
| Preceded by Thomas Gore | U.S. Senator from Oklahoma; 1921–1927 | Succeeded by Elmer Thomas |
