= 1907 United States Senate elections in Oklahoma =

1907 United States Senate election in Oklahoma
- December 10, 1907
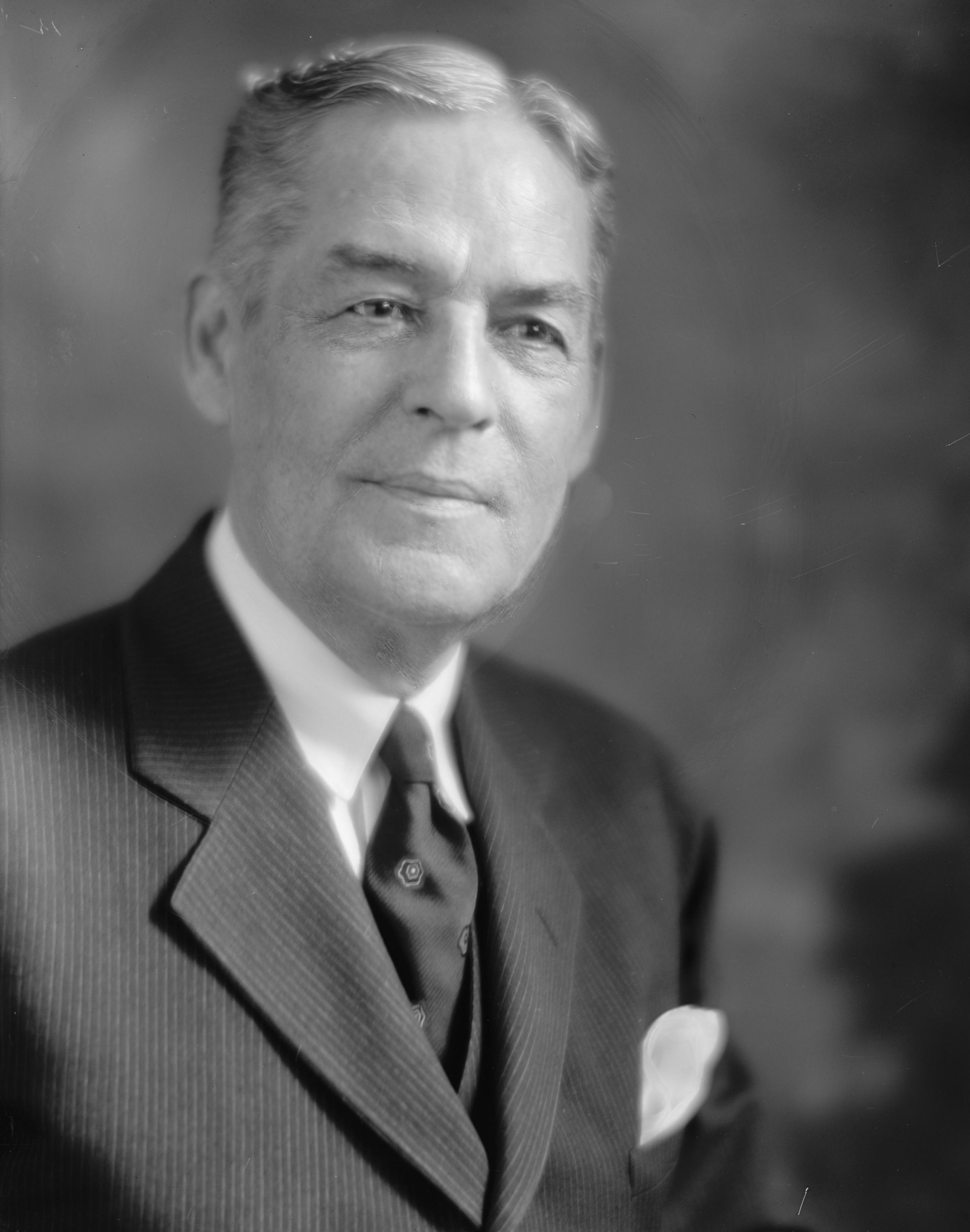

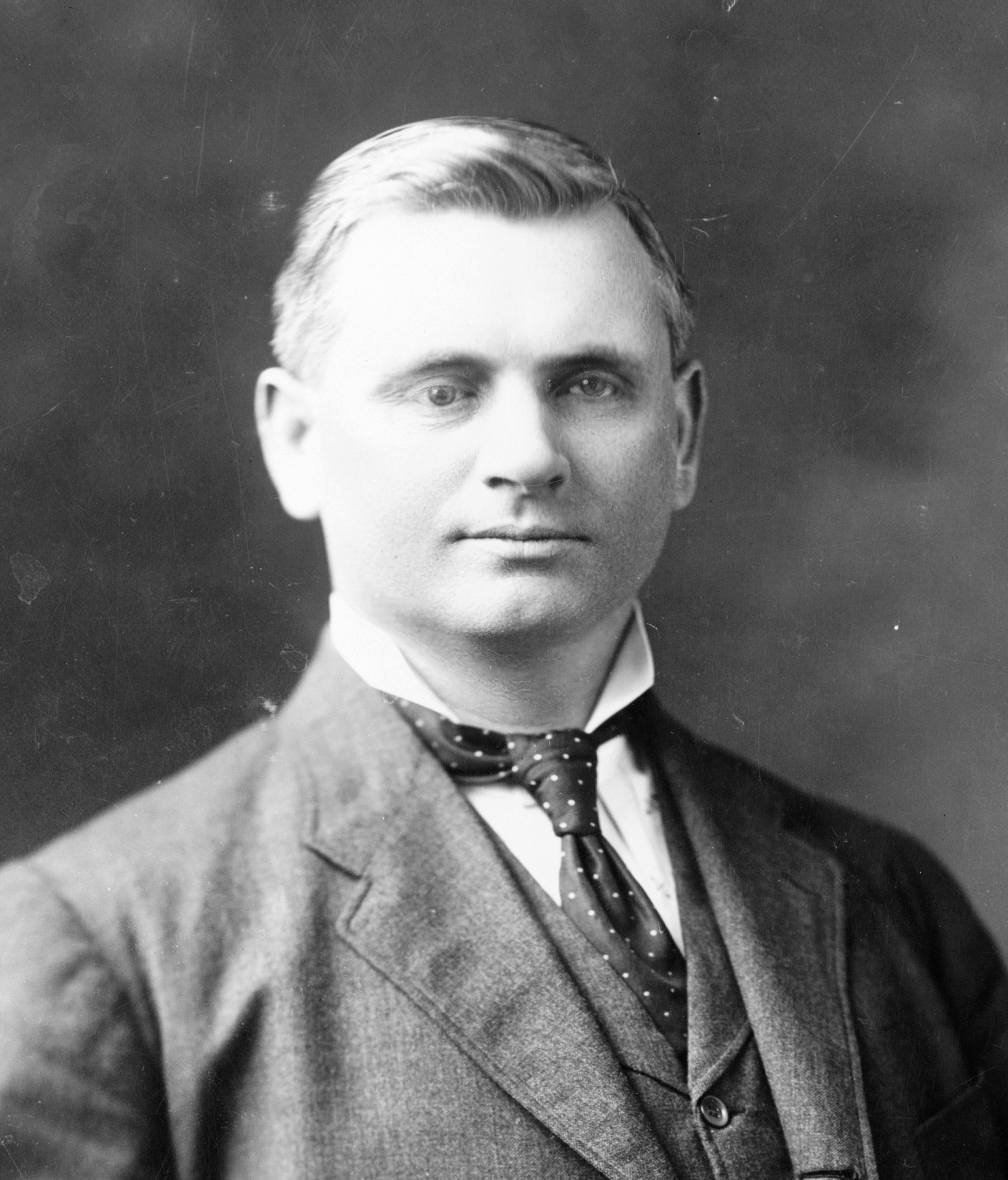
Candidate	Robert L. Owen	Thomas Gore
Party	Democratic	Democratic

The 1907 United States Senate elections in Oklahoma were the inaugural U.S. Senate elections for the new state of Oklahoma. The Oklahoma Legislature elected Robert L. Owen and Thomas Gore.

== Results ==
1907 United States Senate election in Oklahoma (Class 2)
Party	Candidate	Votes	%
Democratic	Robert L. Owen	128	74.4%
Republican	Clarence B. Douglas	22	12.8%
Republican	C. B. Jones	22	12.8%
Majority		106	61.6%
Turnout		172	
Democratic win (new seat)			

1907 United States Senate election in Oklahoma (Class 3)
Party	Candidate	Votes	%
Democratic	Thomas Gore	128	74.4%
Republican	Clarence B. Douglas	22	12.8%
Republican	C. B. Jones	22	12.8%
Majority		106	61.6%
Turnout		172	
Democratic win (new seat)			
