= Ulysses S. Stone =

American politician from Oklahoma

Ulysses Stevens Stone
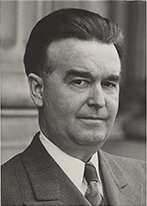

Member of the U.S. House of Representatives from Oklahoma's 5th district
- In office March 4, 1929 – March 3, 1931
- Preceded by: Fletcher B. Swank
- Succeeded by: Fletcher B. Swank

Personal details
- Born: December 17, 1878 DeWitt Township, Illinois, United States
- Died: December 8, 1962 (aged 83) Oklahoma City, Oklahoma, US
- Party: Republican
- Spouse: Menor Minnie Butler Stone
- Children: Helen Butler Stone Cobb
- Education: University of Oklahoma
- Profession: banker; oil operator; politician

Ulysses Stevens Stone (December 17, 1878 – December 8, 1962) was an American politician and a U.S. representative from Oklahoma.

== Biography ==
Born on a farm near Weldon, Illinois, Stone was the son of David C. and Sarah J. Hollenbeck Stone. He moved with his parents to Jones, Oklahoma, in 1894, and attended the country schools and the University of Oklahoma at Norman. In 1902 he married Menor Minnie Butler, and they had one daughter, Helen.

== Career ==
Stone engaged in the banking business at Jones, Oklahoma from 1894 to 1905 and as an oil operator at Norman and Oklahoma City in 1905. He was an unsuccessful candidate for Governor of Oklahoma in 1918 and for election to the United States Senate in 1926.

Elected as a Republican to the Seventy-first Congress, Stone served from March 4, 1929 to March 3, 1931. He was an unsuccessful candidate for reelection in 1930 to the Seventy-second Congress and for election in 1934 to the Seventy-fourth Congress. He resumed activities as an oil operator and also had interests in investments and real estate.

== Death ==
Stone died in Oklahoma City, Oklahoma, on December 8, 1962, at the age of 83. He was cremated and his ashes are interred at Rose Hill Burial Park in Oklahoma City.

U.S. House of Representatives
Preceded by Fletcher B. Swank	Member of the U.S. House of Representatives from Oklahoma's 5th congressional district 1929–1931	Succeeded by Fletcher B. Swank
