= 1924 United States Senate election in Oklahoma =

- November 4, 1924
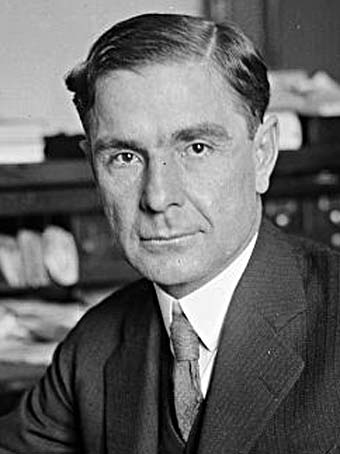

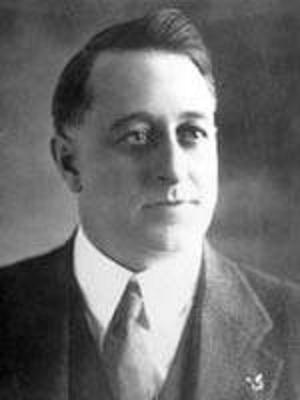
Nominee	William B. Pine	Jack C. Walton
Party	Republican	Democratic
Popular vote	339,646	196,417
Percentage	61.46%	35.54%
- County results Pine: 40–50% 50–60% 60–70% 70–80% Walton: 40–50% 50–60% 60–70%
U.S. senator before election
Robert L. Owen
Democratic
Elected U.S. Senator
William B. Pine
Republican

The 1924 United States Senate election in Oklahoma took place on November 4, 1924. Incumbent Democratic Senator Robert Latham Owen declined to run for re-election. In a crowded Democratic primary, impeached former Governor Jack C. Walton won the party's nomination with a narrow plurality. In the general election, he faced businessman William B. Pine, the Republican nominee. Though Democratic presidential nominee John W. Davis narrowly won the state over President Calvin Coolidge, Walton's unpopularity and controversy caused Democrats to lose the seat; Pine defeated Walton in a landslide.

== Democratic primary ==
=== Candidates ===
- Sargent Prentiss Freeling, former Oklahoma Attorney General
- Thomas Gore, former U.S. Senator (1907–21)
- Everette B. Howard, U.S. Representative from Tulsa
- Jack C. Walton, former Governor of Oklahoma
- C. J. Wrightsman, member of the state board of regents

=== Results ===
Democratic primary
Party	Candidate	Votes	%
Democratic	Jack C. Walton	91,510	30.67%
Democratic	Everette B. Howard	83,922	28.13%
Democratic	Thomas Gore	56,249	18.85%
Democratic	C. J. Wrightsman	51,291	17.19%
Democratic	Sargent Prentiss Freeling	15,384	5.16%
Total votes		298,356	100.00%

== Republican primary ==
=== Candidates ===
- William B. Pine, businessman
- Eugene Lorton, editor of the Tulsa World
- Hugh Scott, commander of the soldiers' memorial hospital
- C. B. Leedy, State Senator
- B. G. Bingham
- John G. Lieber

=== Results ===
Republican primary
Party	Candidate	Votes	%
Republican	William B. Pine	60,129	55.75%
Republican	Eugene Lorton	24,374	22.60%
Republican	Hugh Scott	14,345	13.30%
Republican	C. B. Leedy	3,273	3.03%
Republican	B. G. Bingham	3,153	2.92%
Republican	John G. Lieber	2,573	2.39%
Total votes		107,847	100.00%

== Farmer–Labor Primary ==
=== Candidates ===
- George Wilson
- William L. Loe

=== Results ===
Farmer–Labor primary
Party	Candidate	Votes	%
Farmer–Labor	George Wilson	187	93.50%
Farmer–Labor	William L. Loe	13	6.50%
Total votes		200	100.00%

== General election ==
=== Results ===
1924 United States Senate election in Oklahoma
Party	Candidate	Votes	%	±%
Republican	William B. Pine	339,646	61.46%	+20.77%
Democratic	Jack C. Walton	196,417	35.54%	−19.92%
Farmer–Labor	George Wilson	15,025	2.72%	—
Independent	Jack Benson	541	0.10%	—
Independent	E. N. Bryant	516	0.09%	—
Independent	Alonzo Turner	239	0.04%	—
Independent	Thomas P. Hopley	237	0.04%	—
Majority		143,229	25.92%	+11.15%
Turnout		552,621		
Republican gain from Democratic				
