= Gomer Griffith Smith =

American politician

Gomer G. Smith
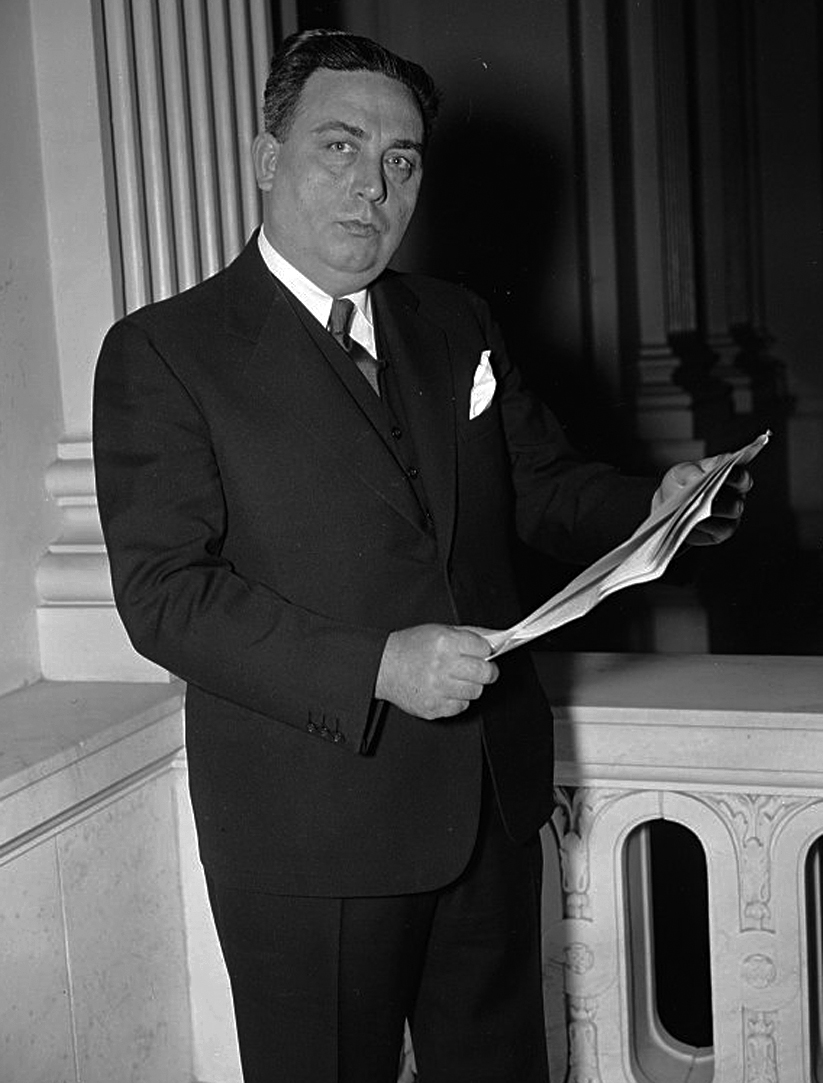

Member of the U.S. House of Representatives from Oklahoma's 5th district
- In office December 10, 1937 – January 3, 1939
- Preceded by: Robert P. Hill
- Succeeded by: Mike Monroney

Personal details
- Born: Gomer Griffith Smith; July 11, 1896 Jackson County, Missouri, U.S.
- Died: May 26, 1953 (aged 56) Oklahoma City, Oklahoma, U.S.
- Resting place: Rose Hill Burial Park, Oklahoma City
- Citizenship: United States
- Party: Democratic
- Spouse: Hazel Mae Mizner Smith
- Education: Rockingham Academy, Kansas City, Missouri
- Profession: Attorney; politician

Gomer Griffith Smith (July 11, 1896 – May 26, 1953) was an American lawyer and politician who served one term as a U.S. representative from Oklahoma from 1937 to 1939.

== Early life and education ==
Born on a farm near Kansas City, Missouri, Smith was the son of Joseph M. and Elizabeth Lewis Smith, and attended the common and high schools of Missouri. He was graduated from Rockingham Academy, Kansas City, Missouri, in 1915.

While teaching in a country school near Excelsior Springs, Missouri from 1916 to 1918, Smith studied law. He was admitted to the Missouri bar in 1920, to the Oklahoma bar in 1922, and commenced practice in Oklahoma City, Oklahoma.

== Congress ==
Elected as a Democrat to the Seventy-fifth Congress to fill the vacancy caused by the death of Robert P. Hill, Smith served from December 10, 1937, to January 3, 1939. He was not a candidate for renomination in 1938, but was an unsuccessful candidate for the Democratic nomination for United States Senator, and resumed the practice of law in Oklahoma City.

== Private life ==
He married Hazel Mae Mizner, and they were the parents of a son and three daughters. They also adopted Gomer's youngest brother.

== Death ==
Died in Oklahoma City, Oklahoma County, Oklahoma, on May 26, 1953 (age 56 years, 319 days). He is entombed in mausoleum at Rose Hill Burial Park, Oklahoma City.

U.S. House of Representatives
Preceded by Robert P. Hill	Member of the U.S. House of Representatives from Oklahoma's 5th congressional district 1937–1939	Succeeded by Mike Monroney
