= 1954 United States Senate election in Oklahoma =

- November 2, 1954
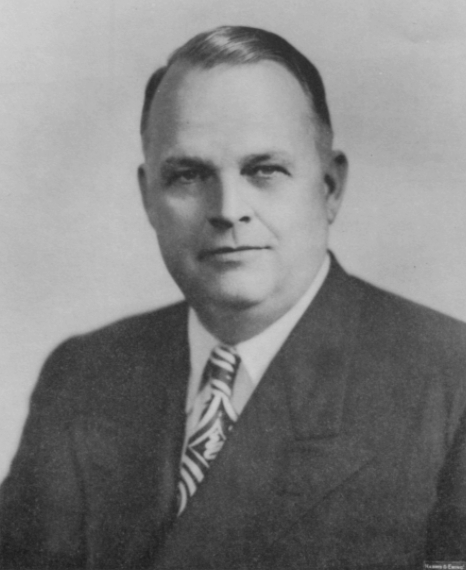

Nominee	Robert S. Kerr	Fred M. Mock
Party	Democratic	Republican
Popular vote	335,127	262,013
Percentage	55.84%	43.66%
- County results Kerr: 50–60% 60–70% 70–80% 80–90% Mock: 50–60% 60–70%
U.S. senator before election
Robert S. Kerr
Democratic
Elected U.S. Senator
Robert S. Kerr
Democratic

The 1954 United States Senate election in Oklahoma took place on November 2, 1954. Incumbent Democratic Senator Robert S. Kerr ran for re-election to a second term. He faced strong competition in the Democratic primary from former Governor Roy J. Turner, and though he won a sizable victory over Turner in the primary, he fell shy of an outright majority. Turner, however, withdrew from the race before a runoff election could be held. On the Republican side, U.S. Attorney Fred Mock won the nomination following a runoff against newspaper publisher Raymond Fields. In the general election, Kerr ended up easily defeating Mock, but with a significantly reduced victory from 1948.

== Democratic primary ==
=== Candidates ===
- Robert S. Kerr, incumbent U.S. Senator
- Roy J. Turner, former Governor of Oklahoma
- David C. Shapard, Oklahoma City attorney
- George H. Hunt
- Jess L. Pullen
- Henry Harding
- A.B. McDonald
- Jeff McHenry
- Sooner Singleton

=== Results ===
Democratic primary
Party	Candidate	Votes	%
Democratic	Robert S. Kerr (inc.)	238,543	49.00%
Democratic	Roy J. Turner	205,241	42.16%
Democratic	David C. Shapard	11,071	2.27%
Democratic	George H. Hunt	10,014	2.06%
Democratic	Jess L. Pullen	6,267	1.29%
Democratic	Henry Harding	6,154	1.26%
Democratic	A. B. McDonald	3,745	0.77%
Democratic	Jeff McHenry	2,934	0.60%
Democratic	Sooner Singleton	2,896	0.59%
Total votes		486,865	100.00%

Following the Democratic primary, Kerr had a sizable lead over Turner, but fell just short of a majority, thereby triggering a runoff election. However, several weeks after the primary, Turner withdrew from the runoff, announcing that he would not be able to adequately finance his campaign. After Turner's withdrawal, David C. Shapard, who placed a distant third in the primary, announced that he would attempt to force a runoff with Kerr. The State Election Board denied Kerr's request, and he appealed to the state Supreme Court, which quickly denied his appeal, concluding that his claim had no "apparent merit."

=== Runoff election results ===
Democratic primary runoff
Party	Candidate	Votes	%
Democratic	Robert S. Kerr (inc.)	318,862	100.00%
Total votes		318,862	100.00%

== Republican primary ==
=== Candidates ===
- Fred M. Mock, U.S. Attorney for the Western District of Oklahoma
- Raymond H. Fields, newspaper publisher, 1950 Republican candidate for the U.S. Senate
- Ernest G. Albright
- Frank A. Anderson

=== Results ===
Republican primary
Party	Candidate	Votes	%
Republican	Raymond H. Fields	23,339	41.53%
Republican	Fred M. Mock	17,062	30.36%
Republican	Ernest G. Albright	11,521	20.50%
Republican	Frank A. Anderson	4,270	7.60%
Total votes		56,192	100.00%

=== Runoff election results ===
Republican primary runoff
Party	Candidate	Votes	%
Republican	Fred M. Mock	22,340	53.43%
Republican	Raymond H. Fields	19,471	46.57%
Total votes		41,811	100.00%

== General election ==
=== Results ===
1954 United States Senate election in Oklahoma
Party	Candidate	Votes	%	±%
Democratic	Robert S. Kerr (inc.)	335,127	55.84%	−6.46%
Republican	Fred M. Mock	262,013	43.66%	+6.26%
Independent	George V. Fried	1,563	0.26%	—
Independent	George H. Brasier	1,417	0.24%	—
Majority		73,114	12.18%	−12.71%
Turnout		600,120		
Democratic hold				
