= 1946 Oklahoma gubernatorial election =

- November 5, 1946
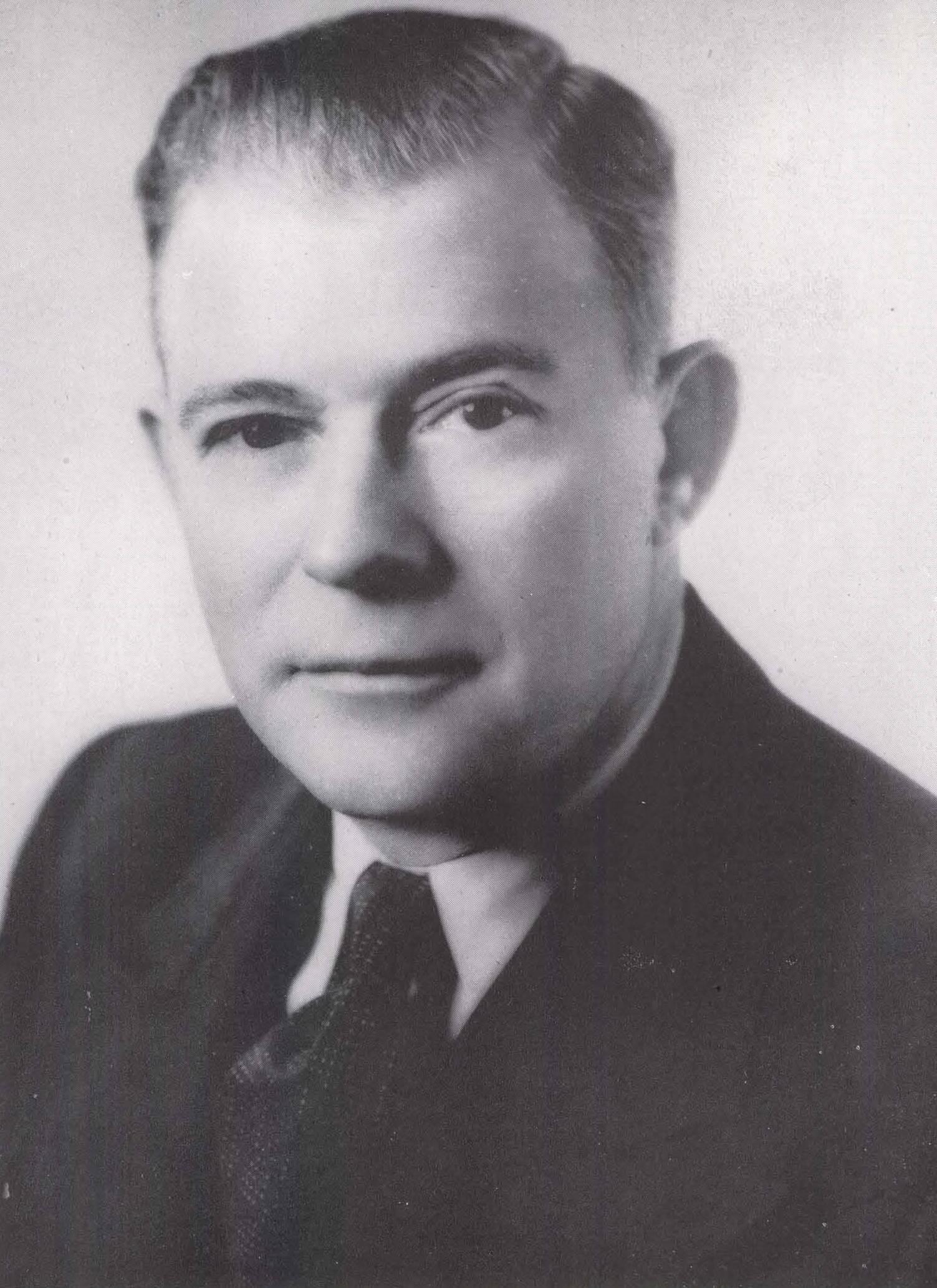

| Nominee | Roy J. Turner | Olney F. Flynn |
| Party | Democratic | Republican |
| Popular vote | 259,491 | 227,426 |
| Percentage | 52.46% | 45.98% |
- County results Turner: 50–60% 60–70% 70–80% 80–90% Flynn: 40–50% 50–60% 60–70% 70–80%
Governor before election
Robert S. Kerr
Democratic
Elected Governor
Roy J. Turner
Democratic

The 1946 Oklahoma gubernatorial election was held on November 5, 1946, and was a race for Governor of Oklahoma. Democrat Roy J. Turner defeated Republican Olney F. Flynn and three Independents, Mickey Harrell, R. M. Funk, and Bruno Miller. Dixie Gilmer unsuccessfully sought the Democratic nomination. Harrell was the first woman to run for Governor of Oklahoma.

== Primary election ==
Oklahoma reinstated primary runoffs for this election.

=== Democratic party ===
Businessman Roy J. Turner defeated Tulsa County district attorney Dixie Gilmer in a runoff.

==== Candidates ====
- William O. Coe, former member of Oklahoma House of Representatives
- Dixie Gilmer, District Attorney of Tulsa County
- Johnson D. Hill, member of Oklahoma House of Representatives
- H. C. Jones, Collector of Internal Revenue for the State of Oklahoma
- R. M. McCool
- Fred McDuff
- Earl R. Powers
- Jess L. Pullen, former Assistant Attorney General of Oklahoma
- Roy J. Turner, businessman

==== Results ====
Democratic primary results
| Party | Candidate | Votes | % |
|---|---|---|---|
| Democratic | Roy J. Turner | 138,348 | 35.85% |
| Democratic | Dixie Gilmer | 84,783 | 21.97% |
| Democratic | H. C. Jones | 79,237 | 20.53% |
| Democratic | William O. Coe | 61,216 | 15.86% |
| Democratic | Johnson D. Hill | 8,012 | 2.08% |
| Democratic | Fred McDuff | 7,854 | 2.03% |
| Democratic | R. M. McCool | 4,094 | 1.06% |
| Democratic | Earl R. Powers | 1,206 | 0.31% |
| Democratic | Jess L. Pullen | 1,202 | 0.31% |
| Total votes | | 385,952 | 100.00% |

Democratic primary runoff results
| Party | Candidate | Votes | % |
|---|---|---|---|
| Democratic | Roy J. Turner | 194,311 | 53.43% |
| Democratic | Dixie Gilmer | 169,397 | 46.57% |
| Total votes | | 363,708 | 100.00% |

=== Republican party ===
Mayor of Tulsa Olney F. Flynn secured the Republican nomination by a wide margin.

==== Candidates ====
- Rexford B. Cragg
- Harry E. Ingram
- Olney F. Flynn, mayor of Tulsa

==== Results ====
Republican primary results
| Party | Candidate | Votes | % |
|---|---|---|---|
| Republican | Olney F. Flynn | 30,348 | 73.77% |
| Republican | Harry E. Ingram | 6,932 | 16.85% |
| Republican | Rexford B. Cragg | 3,859 | 9.38% |
| Total votes | | 41,139 | 100.00% |

== General election ==
=== Results ===
1946 Oklahoma gubernatorial election
| Party | Candidate | Votes | % | ±% |
|---|---|---|---|---|
| Democratic | Roy J. Turner | 259,491 | 52.46% | +0.57% |
| Republican | Olney F. Flynn | 227,426 | 45.98% | −1.66% |
| Independent | Mickey Harrell | 7,181 | 1.45% | |
| Independent | R. M. Funk | 257 | 0.05% | |
| Independent | Bruno Miller | 244 | 0.05% | |
| Total votes | | 494,599 | 100.00% | |
| Majority | | 32,065 | 6.48% | |
| Democratic hold | | Swing | +2.23% | |

=== Results by county ===
| County | Roy J. Turner Democratic | | Olney F. Flynn Republican | | Mickey Harrell Independent | | R. M. Funk Independent | | Bruno Miller Independent | | Margin | | Total votes cast |
| County | # | % | # | % | # | % | # | % | # | % | # | % | Total votes cast |
|---|---|---|---|---|---|---|---|---|---|---|---|---|---|
| Adair | 2,684 | 57.28% | 1,982 | 42.60% | 14 | 0.30% | 4 | 0.09% | 2 | 0.04% | 702 | 14.98% | 4,686 |
| Alfalfa | 1,060 | 30.36% | 2,318 | 66.38% | 112 | 3.21% | 1 | 0.03% | 1 | 0.03% | -1,258 | -36.03% | 3,492 |
| Atoka | 1,933 | 70.39% | 792 | 28.84% | 17 | 0.62% | 2 | 0.07% | 2 | 0.07% | 1,141 | 41.55% | 2,746 |
| Beaver | 1,068 | 49.65% | 1,040 | 48.35% | 41 | 1.91% | 0 | 0.00% | 2 | 0.09% | 28 | 1.30% | 2,151 |
| Beckham | 2,552 | 67.02% | 1,148 | 30.15% | 106 | 2.78% | 1 | 0.03% | 1 | 0.03% | 1,404 | 36.87% | 3,808 |
| Blaine | 1,507 | 37.01% | 2,463 | 60.49% | 97 | 2.38% | 1 | 0.02% | 4 | 0.10% | -956 | -23.48% | 4,072 |
| Bryan | 4,746 | 84.04% | 830 | 14.70% | 62 | 1.10% | 5 | 0.09% | 4 | 0.07% | 3,916 | 69.35% | 5,647 |
| Caddo | 4,681 | 58.98% | 3,131 | 39.45% | 120 | 1.51% | 2 | 0.03% | 2 | 0.03% | 1,550 | 19.53% | 7,936 |
| Canadian | 3,076 | 47.24% | 3,179 | 48.82% | 239 | 3.67% | 11 | 0.17% | 7 | 0.11% | -103 | -1.58% | 6,512 |
| Carter | 5,363 | 76.76% | 1,557 | 22.28% | 64 | 0.92% | 0 | 0.00% | 3 | 0.04% | 3,806 | 54.47% | 6,987 |
| Cherokee | 3,214 | 58.20% | 2,288 | 41.43% | 15 | 0.27% | 1 | 0.02% | 4 | 0.07% | 926 | 16.77% | 5,522 |
| Choctaw | 2,700 | 79.79% | 649 | 19.18% | 34 | 1.00% | 0 | 0.00% | 1 | 0.03% | 2,051 | 60.61% | 3,384 |
| Cimarron | 214 | 54.45% | 176 | 44.78% | 3 | 0.76% | 0 | 0.00% | 0 | 0.00% | 38 | 9.67% | 393 |
| Cleveland | 3,511 | 57.80% | 2,478 | 40.80% | 80 | 1.32% | 1 | 0.02% | 4 | 0.07% | 1,033 | 17.01% | 6,074 |
| Coal | 1,502 | 82.17% | 308 | 16.85% | 16 | 0.88% | 1 | 0.05% | 1 | 0.05% | 1,194 | 65.32% | 1,828 |
| Comanche | 4,697 | 65.73% | 2,294 | 32.10% | 149 | 2.09% | 1 | 0.01% | 5 | 0.07% | 2,403 | 33.63% | 7,146 |
| Cotton | 1,731 | 75.23% | 498 | 21.64% | 68 | 2.96% | 1 | 0.04% | 3 | 0.13% | 1,233 | 53.59% | 2,301 |
| Craig | 3,252 | 53.06% | 2,807 | 45.80% | 67 | 1.09% | 2 | 0.03% | 1 | 0.02% | 445 | 7.26% | 6,129 |
| Creek | 5,413 | 43.88% | 6,630 | 53.74% | 284 | 2.30% | 5 | 0.04% | 5 | 0.04% | -1,217 | -9.86% | 12,337 |
| Custer | 3,015 | 59.20% | 2,021 | 39.68% | 54 | 1.06% | 1 | 0.02% | 2 | 0.04% | 994 | 19.52% | 5,093 |
| Delaware | 2,454 | 55.40% | 1,943 | 43.86% | 32 | 0.72% | 1 | 0.02% | 0 | 0.00% | 511 | 11.53% | 4,430 |
| Dewey | 1,307 | 51.05% | 1,202 | 46.95% | 47 | 1.84% | 2 | 0.08% | 2 | 0.08% | 105 | 4.10% | 2,560 |
| Ellis | 929 | 45.54% | 1,060 | 51.96% | 50 | 2.45% | 1 | 0.05% | 0 | 0.00% | -131 | -6.42% | 2,040 |
| Garfield | 3,978 | 30.71% | 8,677 | 66.98% | 285 | 2.20% | 6 | 0.05% | 9 | 0.07% | -4,699 | -36.27% | 12,955 |
| Garvin | 3,614 | 76.12% | 1,082 | 22.79% | 51 | 1.07% | 1 | 0.02% | 0 | 0.00% | 2,532 | 53.33% | 4,748 |
| Grady | 4,399 | 64.35% | 2,341 | 34.25% | 92 | 1.35% | 4 | 0.06% | 0 | 0.00% | 2,058 | 30.11% | 6,836 |
| Grant | 1,257 | 34.64% | 2,311 | 63.68% | 56 | 1.54% | 0 | 0.00% | 5 | 0.14% | -1,054 | -29.04% | 3,629 |
| Greer | 2,260 | 78.83% | 556 | 19.39% | 50 | 1.74% | 0 | 0.00% | 1 | 0.03% | 1,704 | 59.43% | 2,867 |
| Harmon | 1,059 | 81.21% | 215 | 16.49% | 30 | 2.30% | 0 | 0.00% | 0 | 0.00% | 844 | 64.72% | 1,304 |
| Harper | 923 | 48.25% | 936 | 48.93% | 52 | 2.72% | 1 | 0.05% | 1 | 0.05% | -13 | -0.68% | 1,913 |
| Haskell | 2,337 | 67.06% | 1,126 | 32.31% | 17 | 0.49% | 3 | 0.09% | 2 | 0.06% | 1,211 | 34.75% | 3,485 |
| Hughes | 3,545 | 70.00% | 1,474 | 29.11% | 41 | 0.81% | 3 | 0.06% | 1 | 0.02% | 2,071 | 40.90% | 5,064 |
| Jackson | 3,278 | 82.34% | 649 | 16.30% | 50 | 1.26% | 1 | 0.03% | 3 | 0.08% | 2,629 | 66.04% | 3,981 |
| Jefferson | 1,727 | 76.48% | 473 | 20.95% | 54 | 2.39% | 2 | 0.09% | 2 | 0.09% | 1,254 | 55.54% | 2,258 |
| Johnston | 2,089 | 78.80% | 530 | 19.99% | 28 | 1.06% | 2 | 0.08% | 2 | 0.08% | 1,559 | 58.81% | 2,651 |
| Kay | 4,959 | 36.80% | 8,360 | 62.04% | 143 | 1.06% | 3 | 0.02% | 10 | 0.07% | -3,401 | -25.24% | 13,475 |
| Kingfisher | 1,298 | 33.47% | 2,435 | 62.79% | 135 | 3.48% | 5 | 0.13% | 5 | 0.13% | -1,137 | -29.32% | 3,878 |
| Kiowa | 2,212 | 66.99% | 1,030 | 31.19% | 58 | 1.76% | 0 | 0.00% | 2 | 0.06% | 1,182 | 35.80% | 3,302 |
| Latimer | 1,574 | 70.08% | 662 | 29.47% | 10 | 0.45% | 0 | 0.00% | 0 | 0.00% | 912 | 40.61% | 2,246 |
| Le Flore | 4,560 | 71.72% | 1,777 | 27.95% | 12 | 0.19% | 7 | 0.11% | 2 | 0.03% | 2,783 | 43.77% | 6,358 |
| Lincoln | 3,240 | 46.76% | 3,555 | 51.31% | 119 | 1.72% | 10 | 0.14% | 5 | 0.07% | -315 | -4.55% | 6,929 |
| Logan | 2,550 | 39.68% | 3,634 | 56.54% | 231 | 3.59% | 5 | 0.08% | 7 | 0.11% | -1,084 | -16.87% | 6,427 |
| Love | 1,357 | 89.87% | 145 | 9.60% | 6 | 0.40% | 2 | 0.13% | 0 | 0.00% | 1,212 | 80.26% | 1,510 |
| Major | 730 | 24.72% | 2,144 | 72.60% | 77 | 2.61% | 2 | 0.07% | 0 | 0.00% | -1,414 | -47.88% | 2,953 |
| Marshall | 1,662 | 84.32% | 300 | 15.22% | 9 | 0.46% | 0 | 0.00% | 0 | 0.00% | 1,362 | 69.10% | 1,971 |
| Mayes | 3,371 | 55.04% | 2,714 | 44.31% | 38 | 0.62% | 1 | 0.02% | 1 | 0.02% | 657 | 10.73% | 6,125 |
| McClain | 2,057 | 71.72% | 764 | 26.64% | 44 | 1.53% | 1 | 0.03% | 2 | 0.07% | 1,293 | 45.08% | 2,868 |
| McCurtain | 2,951 | 85.78% | 475 | 13.81% | 9 | 0.26% | 3 | 0.09% | 2 | 0.06% | 2,476 | 71.98% | 3,440 |
| McIntosh | 2,144 | 63.38% | 1,166 | 34.47% | 69 | 2.04% | 2 | 0.06% | 2 | 0.06% | 978 | 28.91% | 3,383 |
| Murray | 2,123 | 76.75% | 615 | 22.23% | 25 | 0.90% | 1 | 0.04% | 2 | 0.07% | 1,508 | 54.52% | 2,766 |
| Muskogee | 8,218 | 60.00% | 5,384 | 39.31% | 83 | 0.61% | 9 | 0.07% | 3 | 0.02% | 2,834 | 20.69% | 13,697 |
| Noble | 1,547 | 37.70% | 2,476 | 60.35% | 78 | 1.90% | 2 | 0.05% | 0 | 0.00% | -929 | -22.64% | 4,103 |
| Nowata | 1,814 | 43.92% | 2,171 | 52.57% | 134 | 3.24% | 10 | 0.24% | 1 | 0.02% | -357 | -8.64% | 4,130 |
| Okfuskee | 2,061 | 58.89% | 1,359 | 38.83% | 71 | 2.03% | 5 | 0.14% | 4 | 0.01% | 702 | 20.06% | 3,500 |
| Oklahoma | 28,626 | 48.14% | 29,772 | 50.07% | 979 | 1.65% | 32 | 0.05% | 56 | 0.09% | -1,146 | -1.93% | 59,465 |
| Okmulgee | 6,446 | 58.76% | 4,294 | 39.14% | 216 | 1.97% | 9 | 0.08% | 5 | 0.05% | 2,152 | 19.62% | 10,970 |
| Osage | 3,668 | 46.24% | 4,107 | 51.78% | 151 | 1.90% | 3 | 0.04% | 3 | 0.04% | -439 | -5.53% | 7,932 |
| Ottawa | 3,914 | 51.56% | 3,605 | 47.49% | 65 | 0.86% | 4 | 0.05% | 3 | 0.04% | 309 | 4.07% | 7,591 |
| Pawnee | 1,682 | 35.23% | 2,965 | 62.11% | 119 | 2.49% | 5 | 0.10% | 3 | 0.06% | -1,283 | -26.87% | 4,774 |
| Payne | 4,065 | 47.66% | 4,325 | 50.71% | 137 | 1.61% | 2 | 0.02% | 0 | 0.00% | -260 | -3.05% | 8,529 |
| Pittsburg | 5,872 | 72.40% | 2,195 | 27.06% | 38 | 0.47% | 4 | 0.05% | 2 | 0.02% | 3,677 | 45.33% | 8,111 |
| Pontotoc | 4,527 | 67.68% | 2,116 | 31.63% | 42 | 0.63% | 2 | 0.03% | 2 | 0.03% | 2,411 | 36.04% | 6,689 |
| Pottawatomie | 5,336 | 54.71% | 4,283 | 43.91% | 123 | 1.26% | 4 | 0.04% | 7 | 0.07% | 1,053 | 10.80% | 9,753 |
| Pushmataha | 2,505 | 80.65% | 573 | 18.45% | 22 | 0.71% | 3 | 0.10% | 3 | 0.10% | 1,932 | 62.20% | 3,106 |
| Roger Mills | 1,746 | 73.39% | 575 | 24.17% | 54 | 2.27% | 0 | 0.00% | 4 | 0.17% | 1,171 | 49.22% | 2,379 |
| Rogers | 2,358 | 49.16% | 2,360 | 49.20% | 79 | 1.65% | 0 | 0.00% | 0 | 0.00% | -2 | -0.04% | 4,797 |
| Seminole | 4,819 | 58.36% | 3,352 | 40.59% | 87 | 1.05% | 0 | 0.00% | 0 | 0.00% | 1,467 | 17.76% | 8,258 |
| Sequoyah | 3,243 | 65.78% | 1,670 | 33.87% | 12 | 0.24% | 4 | 0.08% | 1 | 0.02% | 1,573 | 31.91% | 4,930 |
| Stephens | 3,358 | 66.19% | 1,666 | 32.84% | 48 | 0.95% | 1 | 0.02% | 0 | 0.00% | 1,692 | 33.35% | 5,073 |
| Texas | 1,129 | 54.83% | 887 | 43.08% | 42 | 2.04% | 1 | 0.05% | 0 | 0.00% | 242 | 11.75% | 2,059 |
| Tillman | 2,423 | 77.46% | 648 | 20.72% | 55 | 1.76% | 0 | 0.00% | 2 | 0.06% | 1,775 | 56.75% | 3,128 |
| Tulsa | 19,859 | 32.49% | 40,734 | 66.63% | 496 | 0.81% | 30 | 0.05% | 13 | 0.02% | -20,875 | -34.15% | 61,132 |
| Wagoner | 2,056 | 44.40% | 2,527 | 54.57% | 39 | 0.84% | 6 | 0.13% | 3 | 0.06% | -471 | -10.17% | 4,631 |
| Washington | 2,886 | 35.11% | 5,063 | 61.60% | 262 | 3.19% | 6 | 0.07% | 2 | 0.02% | -2,177 | -26.49% | 8,219 |
| Washita | 2,311 | 65.67% | 1,143 | 32.48% | 61 | 1.73% | 2 | 0.06% | 2 | 0.06% | 1,168 | 33.19% | 3,519 |
| Woods | 1,678 | 40.45% | 2,381 | 57.40% | 87 | 2.10% | 2 | 0.05% | 0 | 0.00% | -703 | -16.95% | 4,148 |
| Woodward | 1,481 | 43.82% | 1,855 | 54.88% | 39 | 1.15% | 2 | 0.06% | 3 | 0.09% | -374 | -11.07% | 3,380 |
| Totals | 259,491 | 52.46% | 227,426 | 45.98% | 7,181 | 1.45% | 257 | 0.05% | 244 | 0.05% | 32,065 | 6.48% | 494,599 |

==== Counties that flipped from Republican to Democratic ====
- Dewey

==== Counties that flipped from Democratic to Republican ====
- Oklahoma
