= Henry Asp =

American lawyer

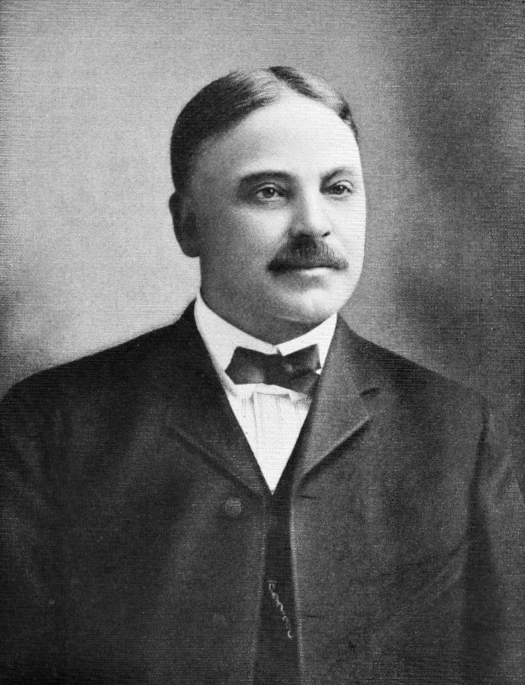
- Born: Henry E. Asp; January 1, 1856; New Boston, Illinois
- Died: July 1, 1923 (aged 67); Oklahoma City, Oklahoma
- Burial place: Rose Hill Burial Park
- Occupation: Attorney
- Years active: 46

Henry E. Asp (1856–1923) was an attorney and politician who was instrumental in the founding of the University of Oklahoma.

== Early life ==
Asp was born in New Boston, Illinois, on January 1, 1856. His Swedish-born parents, John Henry and Christina App, died while he was still young, (Note: John Henry Asp was a blacksmith who had joined the Union Army at the start of the American Civil War. He died of injuries suffered at the Battle of Vicksburg.) so Henry was raised by a guardian, George L. Coe, who took him to Winfield, Kansas, where he grew up and learned the trades of making bricks and wooden pails. Disliking these as career choices, he studied law under the direction of the Webb & Torrance law firm, and was admitted to the Kansas bar in 1877. While living in Winfield, he married Nellie Mae Powers, and they had one son, Alfred Alonzo.

== Move to Oklahoma Territory ==
In July 1890, the Asps moved to Guthrie, the capital of the newly created Oklahoma Territory, where he became a lobbyist and solicitor for the Atchison, Topeka and Santa Fe Railway. In 1892, Asp and two other Guthrie lawyers, John Wilford Shartel and James R. Cottingham, became partners in a law firm, handling some of the many land disputes arising after the Land Run of 1889. After most of the land cases were settled in the middle 1890s, Asp spent most of his time representing people who had moved to the Territory because it had more lenient divorce laws than the surrounding states.

Asp also saw an opportunity when the Territorial Legislature provided for a Territorial university to be established in Norman. He handled most of the legal work during the formative years and was soon appointed to its board of trustees. In 1893, he and the school's new president, David R. Boyd, collaborated to obtain federal legislation to provide that section thirteen of each township be set aside for higher education. This was successful, and in gratitude, Norman named streets near the Oklahoma University campus for each of them.

== Preparing for statehood ==
In 1906, Asp spent seven months in Washington D.C. lobbying for Oklahoma statehood, after the proposal to create a state of Sequoyah failed. He also used his rising political influence to ensure that the 1906 Enabling Act provided for his hometown of Guthrie become the capital of the new state. When he returned home, he was elected to the Oklahoma Constitutional Convention as representative from the 25th district. He was also named to several important committees (notably, the Judiciary Committee) and was named Minority Leader for the convention. He had become highly respected by the Democratic Party leaders, especially William H. Murray and Charles N. Haskell.

== Move to Oklahoma City ==
In 1912, Asp moved his home from Guthrie to Oklahoma City. There, he established the law firm of Asp, Snyder, Owen, and Lybrand. and died on July 1, 1923, in Oklahoma City, following an unidentified surgery a week earlier. He was interred at Rose Hill Burial Park.
