= Grayce Breene Kerr =

10th First Lady of Oklahoma
- In office January 11, 1943 – January 13, 1947
- Governor: Robert S. Kerr
- Preceded by: Myrtle Ellenberger Phillips
- Succeeded by: Jessica Grimm Turner

Personal details
- Born: Grayce Emme Breene; September 12, 1900 Jewell, Ohio, U.S.
- Died: March 2, 1965 (aged 64)
- Spouses: Robert S. Kerr (m. 1925–1963) Olney F. Flynn (m. 1964)

Grayce Breene Kerr Flynn (September 12, 1900 - March 2, 1965) was an American businesswoman who served as the 10th First Lady of Oklahoma between 1943 and 1947 during the tenure of her husband Robert S. Kerr. After Kerr's death in 1963, she married former Tulsa mayor Olney F. Flynn.

== Biography ==
Grayce Emme Breene was born in Jewell, Ohio, on September 12, 1900, to Harry and Blanche Breene. The family later moved to northwestern Oklahoma. She met Robert S. Kerr in the summer of 1925 and the couple married on December 26 of that year. The couple had four children. She actively helped her husband campaign when he entered politics.

She served as the 10th First Lady of Oklahoma between 1943 and 1947. Kerr collected furniture and she opened an interior decorating business in Washington D.C. while her husband served in the U.S. Senate between 1949 and 1963. She published cookbooks and opened the Black Angus Restaurant in Poteau, Oklahoma. Her husband died in 1963 and she married Olney Foster Flynn in 1964. She died on March 2, 1965, and is buried at the Memorial Park Cemetery in Tulsa.
