= Edward H. Moore =

American politician (1871–1950)

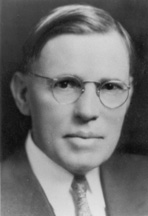

United States Senator from Oklahoma
- In office January 3, 1943 – January 3, 1949
- Preceded by: Joshua B. Lee
- Succeeded by: Robert S. Kerr

Personal details
- Born: Edward Hall Moore; November 19, 1871 Maryville, Missouri, U.S.
- Died: September 2, 1950 (aged 78) Tulsa, Oklahoma, U.S.
- Party: Republican
- Education: Kansas City School of Law

Edward Hall Moore (November 19, 1871 – September 2, 1950) was an American politician who served as a U.S. senator from Oklahoma between 1943 and 1949 as a member of the Republican Party.

== Early years ==
Born on a farm near Maryville, Missouri, Moore attended the public schools and Chillicothe Normal School, where he graduated in 1892. He taught school in Nodaway, Atchinson, and Jackson Counties. Supposedly because he liked to listen to and deliver speeches, he enrolled in the Kansas City School of Law, and graduated in 1900. Moore was admitted to the Missouri bar in 1901 and began practice in Maryville; he moved shortly thereafter to Okmulgee, then a city in Indian Territory, where he became city attorney. He returned to Missouri in 1905 to marry Cora McComb, whom he had met in Chillicothe, Missouri. They came back to Okmulgee, where Moore practiced law until 1919. Meanwhile, he had begun investing in real estate. (Note: Moore eventually parlayed his holdings into a 10,000 acres (40 km^{2}) cattle ranch.) By 1919, he had grown tired of the law, so he sold his practice to enter the oil business. He would become an oil producer, farmer, and cattle raiser.

As a wildcatter, he first struck oil in the Holmes Field of Okfuskee County, Oklahoma. He formed the Independent Oil & Gas Company, with himself as president, eventually expanding its activity into Kansas and Texas. The estimated value of his company was between $25 million and $40 million by 1930, when he sold it to Phillips Petroleum Company. He formed another oil company, E. H. Moore, Inc., in 1932. This entity had more than 400 wells in Oklahoma, Kansas, Texas, and California before he sold it in 1941. Two years later, he sold his cattle operation.

== Political activity ==
Originally, Moore's political views aligned with the Democratic Party, but he became disillusioned with the New Deal during the 1930s. When President Franklin D. Roosevelt announced that he would run for a third term in 1940, Moore campaigned vigorously for Roosevelt's Republican opponent, Wendell Willkie. Despite Willkie's loss in that election, Moore joined the Republican Party.

Two years later, the Republican nominee in Oklahoma's Senate election, former Senator William B. Pine, died before the general election. Someone proposed that Moore replace Pine as the Republican nominee, as he was wealthy enough to finance his own campaign. Moore thus became the Republican nominee and defeated incumbent Democrat Joshua B. Lee by a margin of 55%–45%. He served from January 3, 1943, to January 3, 1949.

While in the Senate, Moore was a reliable anti-New Deal vote, but he was more in favor of international involvement than most of his fellow Republican senators. Nonetheless, in 1945, he was among the seven senators who opposed full United States entry into the United Nations.

Moore voted in favor of almost all military spending and against all spending for public improvements, including projects slated for Oklahoma. However, he supported programs that would benefit the oil industry. He unsuccessfully tried to prevent Leland Olds from being confirmed for a second term as chairman of the Federal Power Commission, saying that Olds was "opposed fundamentally to private enterprise" and "Communistic".

Moore did not run for reelection in 1948, being succeeded by Democrat Robert S. Kerr, and retired from public life and political activities. That same year, he was voted into the Oklahoma Hall of Fame, when he was lauded as a "...statesman and philanthropist."

== Death ==
He died in Tulsa on September 2, 1950, and was interred in Okmulgee Cemetery.

== Notes ==
Party political offices
| Preceded by William B. Pine | Republican nominee for U.S. Senator from Oklahoma (Class 2); 1942 | Succeeded by Ross Rizley |
U.S. Senate
| Preceded by Joshua B. Lee | U.S. senator (Class 2) from Oklahoma; 1943–1949; Served alongside: Elmer Thomas | Succeeded by Robert S. Kerr |
