= Lock and Dam No. 17 =

Dam in Illinois and Iowa, U.S.

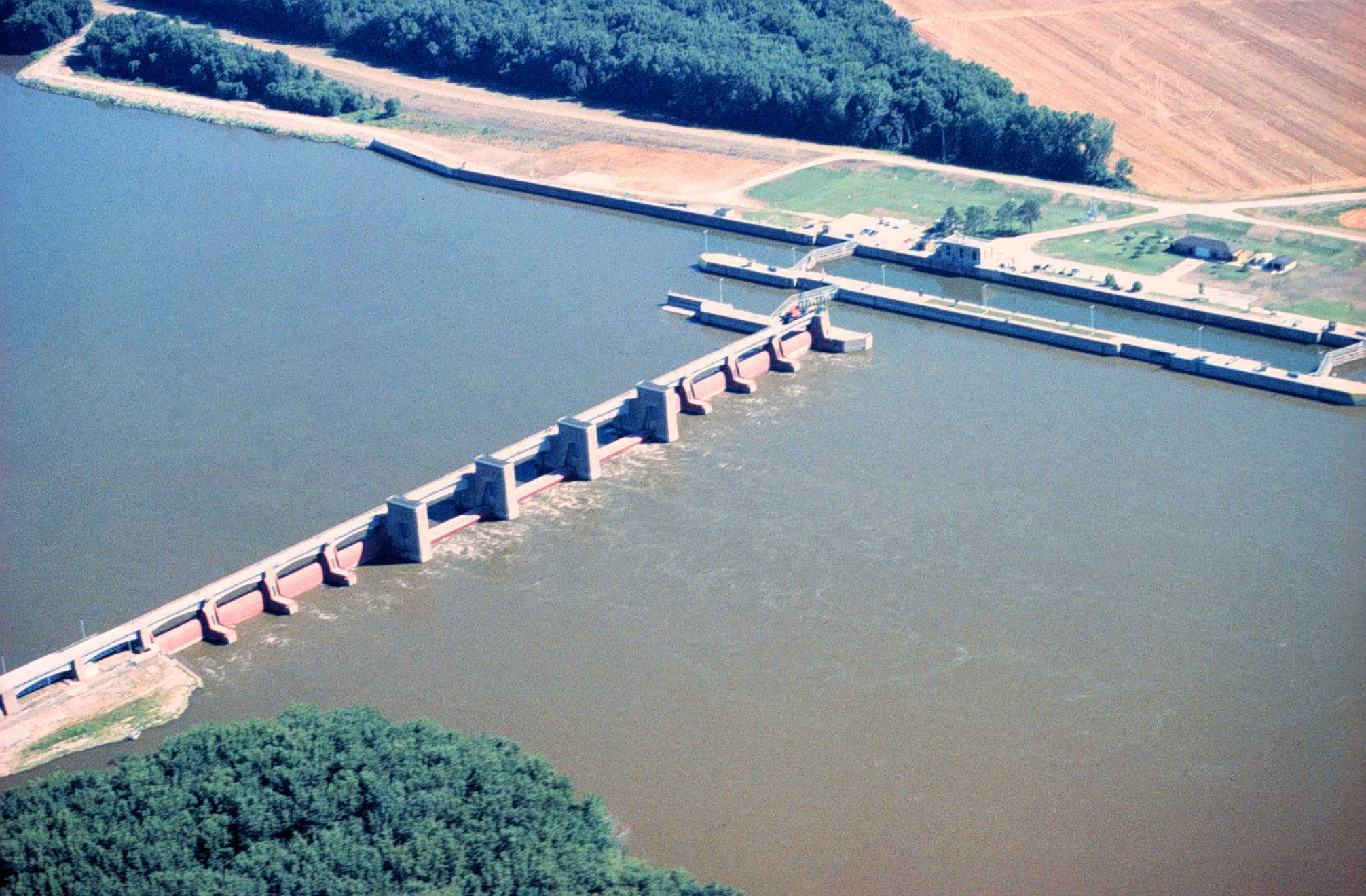
- Mississippi River Lock and Dam number 17

- Location within Illinois Location within the United States
- Location: Jefferson Township & Port Louisa Township, Louisa County, Iowa / New Boston Township, Mercer County, Illinois, near New Boston, Illinois, USA
- Coordinates: 41°11′27″N 91°03′37″W
- Construction began: 1935
- Opening date: May 14, 1939
- Operators: U.S. Army Corps of Engineers, Rock Island District

Dam and spillways
- Impounds: Upper Mississippi River
- Length: 1,121 feet (341.7 m)

Reservoir
- Creates: Pool 17
- Total capacity: 50,000 acre⋅ft (0.062 km^{3})
- Catchment area: 99,600 mi^{2} (258,000 km^{2})
- Lock and Dam No. 17 Historic District
- U.S. National Register of Historic Places
- U.S. Historic district
- Area: 86.9 acres (35.2 ha)
- Architectural style: Moderne, Lock and Dam
- MPS: Upper Mississippi River 9-Foot Navigation Project MPS
- NRHP reference No.: 04000177
- Added to NRHP: March 10, 2004

Lock and Dam No. 17 is a lock and dam located near New Boston, Illinois on the Upper Mississippi River near river mile 437. Its main lock is 110 feet (33.5 m) wide and 600 feet (182.9 m) long with its bottom at an elevation of 518 feet (157.9 m). Normal pool elevation behind the dam is 536 feet (163.4 m). The movable portion of the dam is 1,121 feet (341.7 m) long and consists of 3 roller gates and 8 tainter gates. In 2004, the facility was listed in the National Register of Historic Places as Lock and Dam No. 17 Historic District, #04000177 covering 869 acres (3.5 km^{2}), 1 building, 3 structures and 2 objects.

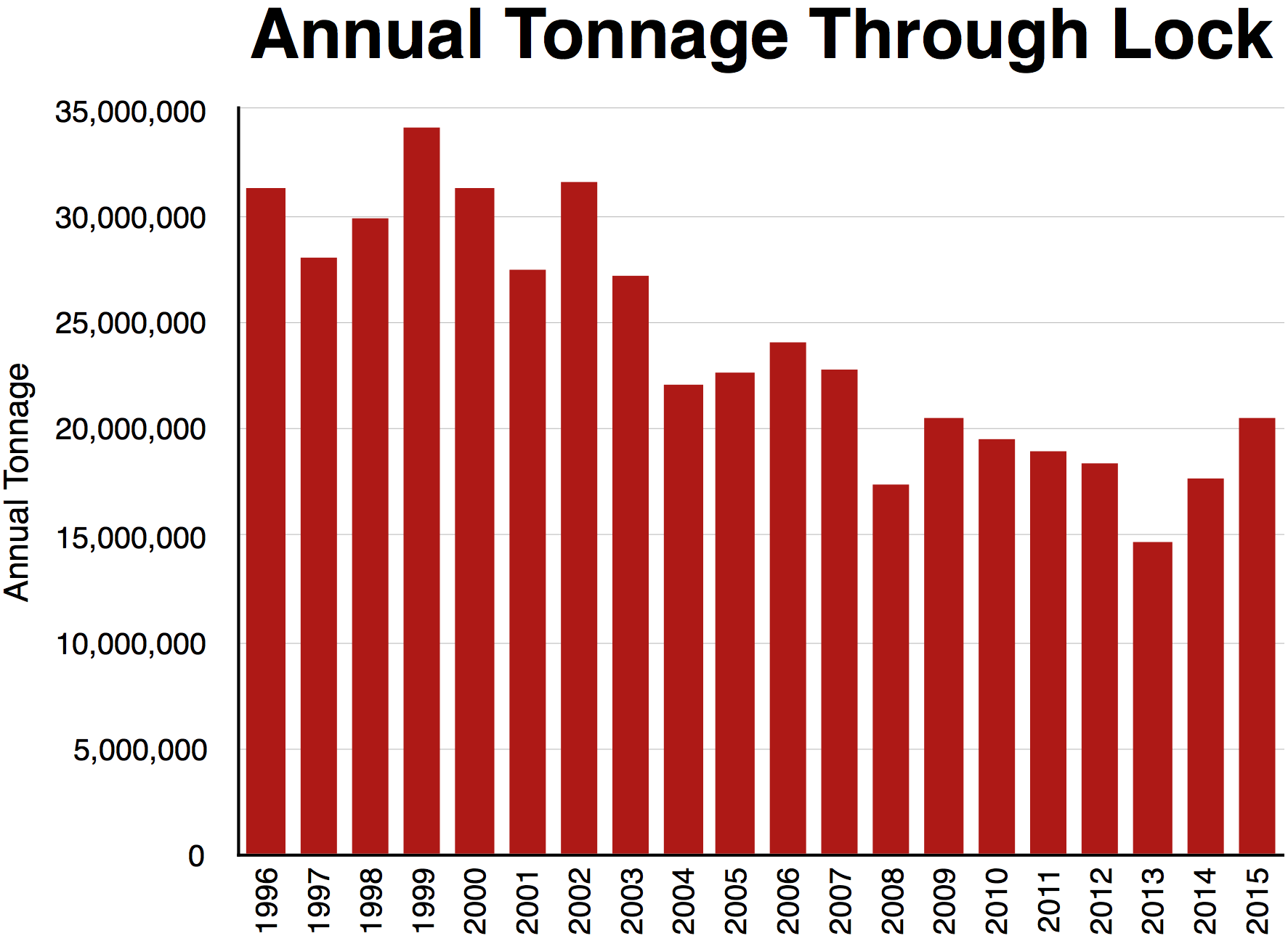
https://web.archive.org/web/20161226221158/http://www.mvr.usace.army.mil/Portals/48/docs/CC/FactSheets/MISS/UMR%20Locks%20%26%20Dams%20-%202016%20%28MVD%29.pdf

== See also ==
- Public Works Administration dams list
