= 1942 United States Senate election in Oklahoma =

- November 3, 1942
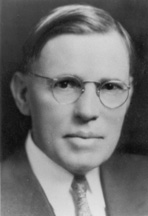

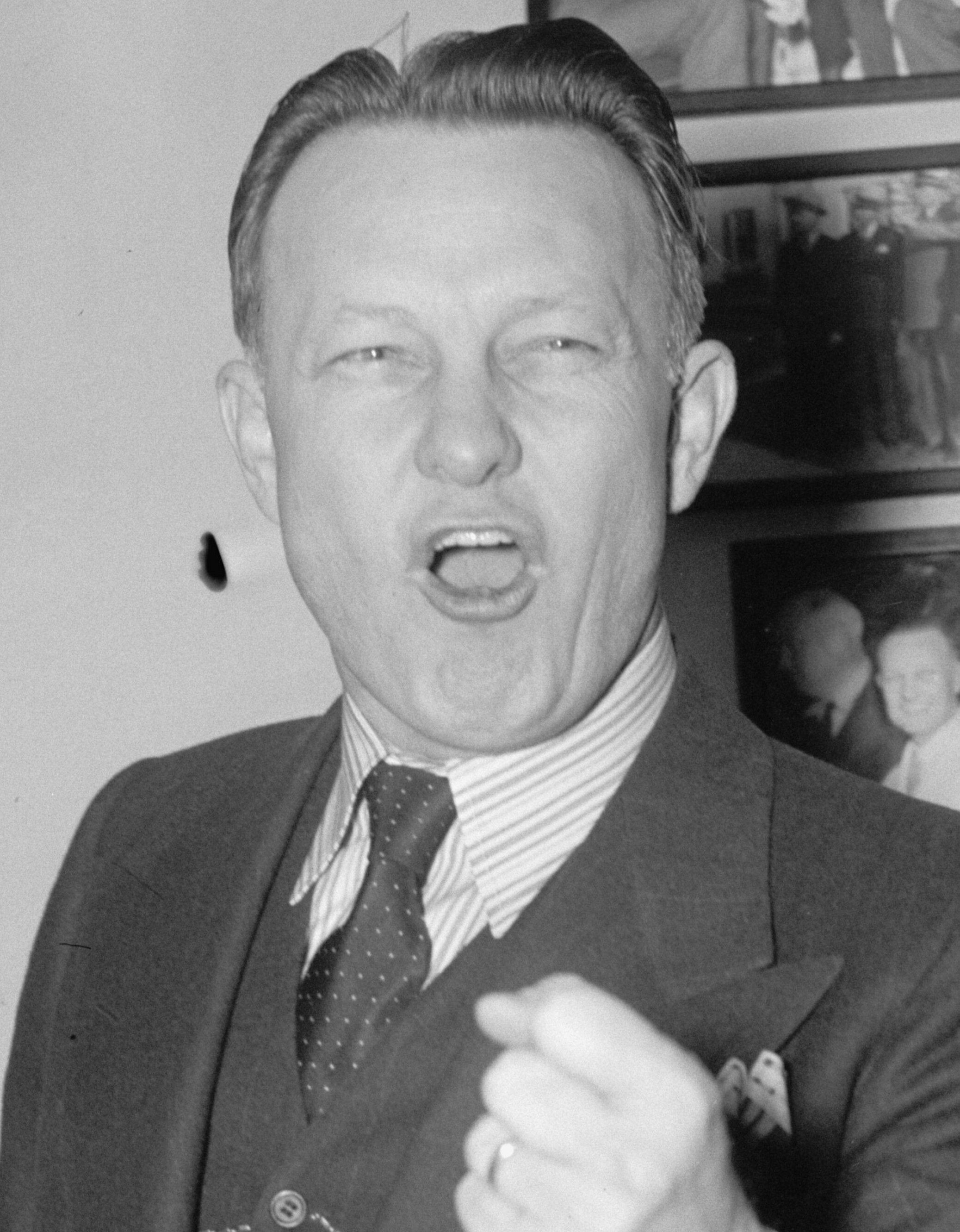
Nominee	Edward H. Moore	Joshua B. Lee
Party	Republican	Democratic
Popular vote	204,163	166,653
Percentage	54.83%	44.76%
- County results Moore: 50–60% 60–70% 70–80% Lee: 50–60% 60–70% 70–80% 80–90%
U.S. senator before election
Joshua B. Lee
Democratic
Elected U.S. Senator
Edward H. Moore
Republican

The 1942 United States Senate election in Oklahoma took place on November 3, 1942. Incumbent Democratic Senator Joshua B. Lee ran for re-election to a second consecutive term. After winning the Democratic primary against several strong opponents, Lee advanced to the general election, where he was originally set to face former Republican Senator William B. Pine. However, shortly after winning the Republican primary, Pine died; the state Republican Party tapped businessman Edward H. Moore as its replacement nominee. In a favorable Republican environment, Moore defeated Lee by a wide margin to win his first and only term in the U.S. Senate.

== Democratic primary ==
=== Candidates ===
- Joshua B. Lee, incumbent U.S. Senator
- Orel Busby, former Justice on the Oklahoma Supreme Court
- William H. Murray, former Governor of Oklahoma
- Wilbur Wright
- Dan Nelson
- Paul V. Beck
- Mark Long
- George H. Brasler
- Lilly Allen Lasley
- Clay Woodrow England

=== Results ===
Democratic primary
Party	Candidate	Votes	%
Democratic	Joshua B. Lee (inc.)	188,279	53.31%
Democratic	Orel Busby	96,647	27.36%
Democratic	William H. Murray	36,925	10.45%
Democratic	Wilbur Wright	7,799	2.21%
Democratic	Dan Nelson	5,428	1.54%
Democratic	Paul V. Beck	5,014	1.42%
Democratic	Mark Long	4,707	1.33%
Democratic	George H. Brasler	3,200	0.91%
Democratic	Lily Allen Lasley	2,855	0.81%
Democratic	Clay Woodrow England	2,328	0.66%
Total votes		353,182	100.00%

== Republican primary ==
=== Candidates ===
- William B. Pine, former U.S. Senator
- S. M. Stauffer
- Frank A. Anderson

=== Results ===
Republican primary
Party	Candidate	Votes	%
Republican	William B. Pine	27,817	77.15%
Republican	S. M. Stauffer	4,536	12.58%
Republican	Frank A. Anderson	3,703	10.27%
Total votes		36,056	100.00%

After he won the Republican primary, William B. Pine died, leaving a vacancy on the Republican ticket. The Republican Party selected wealthy businessman Edward H. Moore as its replacement nominee.

== General election ==
=== Results ===
1942 United States Senate election in Oklahoma
Party	Candidate	Votes	%	±%
Republican	Edward H. Moore	204,163	54.83%	+23.28%
Democratic	Joshua B. Lee (inc.)	166,653	44.76%	−23.21%
Prohibition	Oliver W. Lawton	1,549	0.42%	+0.28%
Majority		37,510	10.07%	−26.35%
Turnout		372,365		
Republican gain from Democratic				
