= Olney F. Flynn =

American politician

22nd Mayor of Tulsa
- In office 1944–1946
- Preceded by: Clarence H. Veale
- Succeeded by: Lee Price

Personal details
- Born: August 28, 1895 Washington D.C., U.S.
- Died: November 2, 1970 (aged 75)
- Party: Republican
- Spouse: Grayce Breene Kerr (m. 1964–1965)
- Parent: Dennis Thomas Flynn (father)

Olney Foster Flynn was an American politician who served as the 22nd Mayor of Tulsa between 1944 and 1946.

== Biography ==
Olney Foster Flynn was born on August 28, 1895, in Washington D.C. to Dennis Thomas Flynn and Adeline Matilda Streeter. His father was a delegate to the U.S. House of Representatives representing Oklahoma Territory. Flynn attended the Pomfret School and Harvard University. In 1917, he joined the United States Navy during World War I. He served on the USS Harvard and USS SC-292, and left the military on January 1, 1919. On October 24, 1932, he married Ailene Longmire and the couple had one child.

Flynn served as the 22nd Mayor of Tulsa from 1944 to 1946. He is considered Tulsa's "wartime mayor" for World War II and multiple former and future mayors worked in his administration such as Dan W. Patton, Lee Price, and George H. Stoner. He was also considered an "anti-New Dealer." He was the Republican nominee in the 1946 Oklahoma gubernatorial election. He married Grayce Breene Kerr in 1964. She died the following year. He died on November 2, 1970.
