= Bust of Robert S. Kerr =

Sculpture in Oklahoma City, Oklahoma, U.S.

- The bust in 2019
- Artist: Keating Donohoe
- Medium: Bronze sculpture
- Subject: Robert S. Kerr
- Location: Oklahoma City, Oklahoma, U.S.; 35°28′10.8″N 97°30′52.7″W

The bust of Robert S. Kerr by Keating Donohoe is installed in Oklahoma City's Robert S. Kerr Park, between Robert S. Kerr Avenue and Couch Drive, in the U.S. state of Oklahoma.

== Description and history ==
The bronze sculpture is 24 inches (61 cm) and 22 inches (56 cm) wide, and rest on a polished red granite base measuring approximately 32 x 67 x 67 inches.

There have been two busts of Kerr. The original was commissioned by Kerr-McGee Corporation, cast in 1961, and dedicated on May 9, 1975. The sculpture was stolen on April 5, 1978, and replaced with a second cast from the same mold c. 1978.

The artwork was surveyed by the Smithsonian Institution's "Save Outdoor Sculpture!" program in 1996.
