= Lasker, North Carolina =

- Town
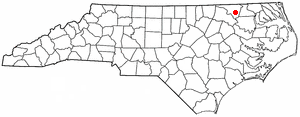
- Location of Lasker, North Carolina
- Coordinates: 36°21′01″N 77°18′21″W
- Country: United States
- State: North Carolina
- County: Northampton

Area
  - Total: 1.12 sq mi (2.90 km^{2})
  - Land: 1.12 sq mi (2.90 km^{2})
  - Water: 0 sq mi (0.00 km^{2})
- Elevation: 85 ft (26 m)

Population (2020)
  - Total: 64
  - Density: 57.2/sq mi (22.09/km^{2})
- Time zone: UTC-5 (Eastern (EST) Play Media)
  - Summer (DST): UTC-4 (EDT)
- ZIP code: 27845
- Area code: 252
- FIPS code: 37-37000
- GNIS feature ID: 2405988

Lasker is a town in Northampton County, North Carolina, United States. As of the 2020 census, Lasker had a population of 64. It is part of the Roanoke Rapids, North Carolina Micropolitan Statistical Area.

== Geography ==
According to the United States Census Bureau, the town has a total area of 1.3 square miles (3.4 km^{2}), all land.

== Education ==
Northeast Academy, a PK, K-12 private school, is located in Lasker.

== Demographics ==
Historical population
Census	Pop.	Note	%±
1900	121		—
1910	203		67.8%
1920	106		−47.8%
1930	201		89.6%
1940	169		−15.9%
1950	177		4.7%
1960	119		−32.8%
1970	114		−4.2%
1980	96		−15.8%
1990	139		44.8%
2000	103		−25.9%
2010	122		18.4%
2020	64		−47.5%
U.S. Decennial Census

As of the census of 2000, there were 103 people, 48 households, and 33 families residing in the town. The population density was 81.9 inhabitants per square mile (31.6/km^{2}). There were 58 housing units at an average density of 46.1 per square mile (17.8/km^{2}). The racial makeup of the town was 88.35% White and 11.65% African American.

There were 48 households, out of which 27.1% had children under the age of 18 living with them, 58.3% were married couples living together, 6.3% had a female householder with no husband present, and 31.3% were non-families. 29.2% of all households were made up of individuals, and 12.5% had someone living alone who was 65 years of age or older. The average household size was 2.15 and the average family size was 2.61.

In the town, the population was spread out, with 19.4% under the age of 18, 4.9% from 18 to 24, 27.2% from 25 to 44, 27.2% from 45 to 64, and 21.4% who were 65 years of age or older. The median age was 44 years. For every 100 females there were 87.3 males. For every 100 females age 18 and over, there were 76.6 males.

The median income for a household in the town was $31,607, and the median income for a family was $31,875. Males had a median income of $31,250 versus $18,125 for females. The per capita income for the town was $51,432. There were 10.0% of families and 10.1% of the population living below the poverty line, including 30.0% of under eighteens and none of those over 64.

== Notable people ==
- Chris Daughtry, singer/songwriter, known as the lead vocalist and rhythm guitarist for the rock band Daughtry
- Stanley Draper, influential community leader responsible for the development of Oklahoma City
