= New Boston, Illinois =

- City
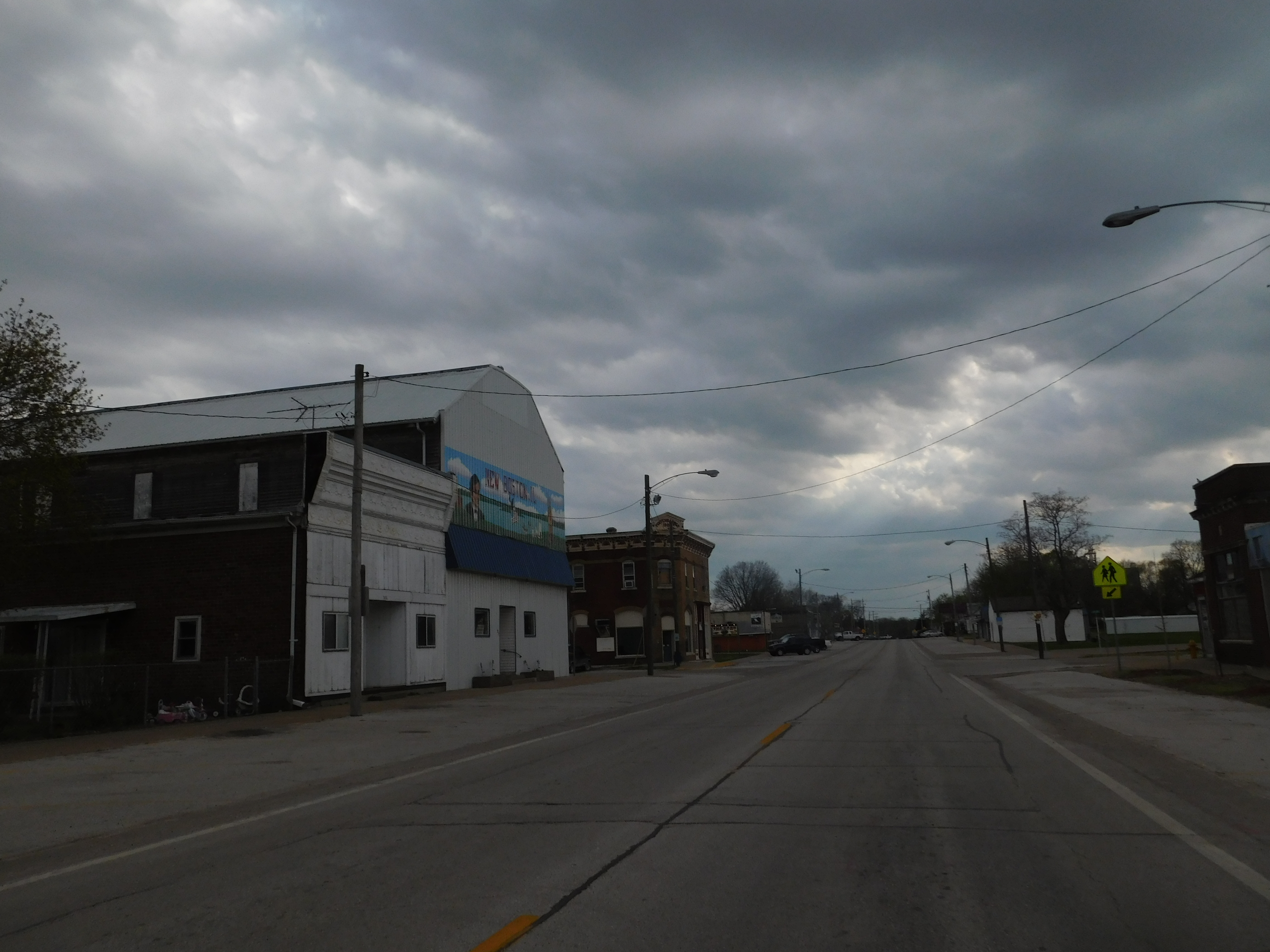
- New Boston along IL 17 in April 2017
- Nickname: Yellow Banks
- Location in Mercer County, Illinois

- Location in the United States
- Coordinates: 41°10′10″N 90°59′48″W
- Country: United States
- State: Illinois
- County: Mercer
- Township: New Boston

Area
  - Total: 1.41 sq mi (3.64 km^{2})
  - Land: 0.94 sq mi (2.44 km^{2})
  - Water: 0.46 sq mi (1.20 km^{2})
- Elevation: 571 ft (174 m)

Population (2020)
  - Total: 613
  - Density: 651/sq mi (251.5/km^{2})
- Time zone: UTC-6 (CST)
  - Summer (DST): UTC-5 (CDT)
- ZIP code: 61272
- Area code: 309
- FIPS code: 17-52220
- GNIS feature ID: 2395186
- Website: cityofnewbostonil.com

New Boston is a city in Mercer County, Illinois, United States on the Mississippi River. The population was 613 at the 2020 census, down from 683 in 2010.

== History ==
New Boston was settled in the 1830s by "Yankee" migrants from Massachusetts.

== Geography ==
New Boston is located on the western edge of Mercer County and the state of Illinois. It sits on the east bank of the Mississippi River, at the mouth of Boston Bay and its inflow, Eliza Creek. Across the river is the state of Iowa and the mouth of the Iowa River, while 5 miles (8 km) upstream on the Mississippi is Lock and Dam No. 17.

Illinois Route 17 has its western terminus in New Boston and leads east 14 miles (23 km) to Aledo, the Mercer county seat. The closest road crossing of the Mississippi is 19 miles (31 km) to the north at Muscatine, Iowa.

According to the U.S. Census Bureau, New Boston has a total area of 1.40 square miles (3.63 km^{2}), of which 0.94 square miles (2.43 km^{2}) are land and 0.46 square miles (1.19 km^{2}), or 32.98%, are water.

Much of the natural area surrounding New Boston is part of the Port Louisa National Wildlife Refuge. The river valley at New Boston is surrounded on both sides by gently rolling bluffs interspersed with rich parcels of wetlands that provide critical wildlife habitat, especially for migratory birds.

== Climate ==
According to the Köppen Climate Classification system, New Boston has a hot-summer humid continental climate, abbreviated "Dfa" on climate maps. The hottest temperature recorded in New Boston was 105 °F (40.6 °C) on July 28, 2011, while the coldest temperature recorded was −26 °F (−32.2 °C) on January 31, 2019.

Climate data for New Boston Dam, Illinois, 1991–2020 normals, extremes 1938–present
Month	Jan	Feb	Mar	Apr	May	Jun	Jul	Aug	Sep	Oct	Nov	Dec	Year
Record high °F (°C)	64 (18)	75 (24)	86 (30)	88 (31)	96 (36)	99 (37)	105 (41)	103 (39)	99 (37)	92 (33)	82 (28)	73 (23)	105 (41)
Mean maximum °F (°C)	54.3 (12.4)	57.2 (14.0)	70.4 (21.3)	81.3 (27.4)	88.3 (31.3)	93.5 (34.2)	96.4 (35.8)	94.5 (34.7)	91.5 (33.1)	83.8 (28.8)	71.0 (21.7)	57.2 (14.0)	97.8 (36.6)
Mean daily maximum °F (°C)	31.5 (−0.3)	36.0 (2.2)	48.6 (9.2)	61.9 (16.6)	72.9 (22.7)	82.5 (28.1)	86.0 (30.0)	83.9 (28.8)	77.4 (25.2)	64.3 (17.9)	49.4 (9.7)	36.7 (2.6)	60.9 (16.1)
Daily mean °F (°C)	23.4 (−4.8)	27.5 (−2.5)	39.1 (3.9)	51.2 (10.7)	62.4 (16.9)	72.2 (22.3)	75.7 (24.3)	73.4 (23.0)	66.0 (18.9)	53.8 (12.1)	40.7 (4.8)	29.3 (−1.5)	51.2 (10.7)
Mean daily minimum °F (°C)	15.3 (−9.3)	19.0 (−7.2)	29.6 (−1.3)	40.4 (4.7)	51.8 (11.0)	61.9 (16.6)	65.3 (18.5)	62.9 (17.2)	54.5 (12.5)	43.3 (6.3)	31.9 (−0.1)	21.8 (−5.7)	41.5 (5.3)
Mean minimum °F (°C)	−6.3 (−21.3)	−0.5 (−18.1)	11.1 (−11.6)	28.4 (−2.0)	38.3 (3.5)	49.6 (9.8)	55.8 (13.2)	53.0 (11.7)	41.5 (5.3)	29.3 (−1.5)	17.8 (−7.9)	2.0 (−16.7)	−11.3 (−24.1)
Record low °F (°C)	−26 (−32)	−25 (−32)	−14 (−26)	17 (−8)	28 (−2)	31 (−1)	49 (9)	46 (8)	30 (−1)	21 (−6)	6 (−14)	−18 (−28)	−26 (−32)
Average precipitation inches (mm)	1.31 (33)	1.72 (44)	2.62 (67)	3.56 (90)	5.05 (128)	4.59 (117)	3.52 (89)	3.83 (97)	3.34 (85)	2.86 (73)	2.13 (54)	1.77 (45)	36.3 (922)
Average precipitation days (≥ 0.01 in)	7.6	7.2	9.0	10.1	12.2	10.1	7.8	8.5	7.5	8.0	7.7	8.1	103.8
Source 1: NOAA
Source 2: National Weather Service

== Demographics ==
Historical population
Census	Pop.	Note	%±
1850	229		—
1860	583		154.6%
1870	779		33.6%
1880	633		−18.7%
1890	445		−29.7%
1900	703		58.0%
1910	718		2.1%
1920	714		−0.6%
1930	736		3.1%
1940	801		8.8%
1950	767		−4.2%
1960	726		−5.3%
1970	706		−2.8%
1980	731		3.5%
1990	620		−15.2%
2000	632		1.9%
2010	683		8.1%
2020	613		−10.2%
U.S. Decennial Census

As of the census of 2000, there were 632 people, 269 households, and 177 families residing in the city. The population density was 672.6 inhabitants per square mile (259.7/km^{2}). There were 317 housing units at an average density of 337.4 per square mile (130.3/km^{2}). The racial makeup of the city was 99.53% White, 0.16% African-American, 0.16% Native American, 0.16% from other races. Hispanic or Latino people of any race were 0.32% of the population.

There were 269 households, out of which 28.3% had children under the age of 18 living with them, 53.2% were married couples living together, 8.2% had a female householder with no husband present, and 34.2% were non-families. 29.0% of all households were made up of individuals, and 12.3% had someone living alone who was 65 years of age or older. The average household size was 2.35 and the average family size was 2.92.

In the city, the population was spread out, with 23.1% under the age of 18, 9.3% from 18 to 24, 25.9% from 25 to 44, 24.5% from 45 to 64, and 17.1% who were 65 years of age or older. The median age was 40 years. For every 100 females, there were 103.2 males. For every 100 females age 18 and over, there were 102.5 males.

The median income for a household in the city was $29,231, and the median income for a family was $36,875. Males had a median income of $32,361 versus $17,917 for females. The per capita income for the city was $15,593. About 6.4% of families and 11.2% of the population were below the poverty line, including 15.9% of those under age 18 and 11.7% of those age 65 or over.

== Notable people ==
- Henry Asp, Oklahoma lawyer
- Paul G. Blazer, first president and CEO of Ashland Inc.
- Robert M. Danford, U.S. Army major general
