= Stanley Draper =

Civic leader and businessman (1889–1976)

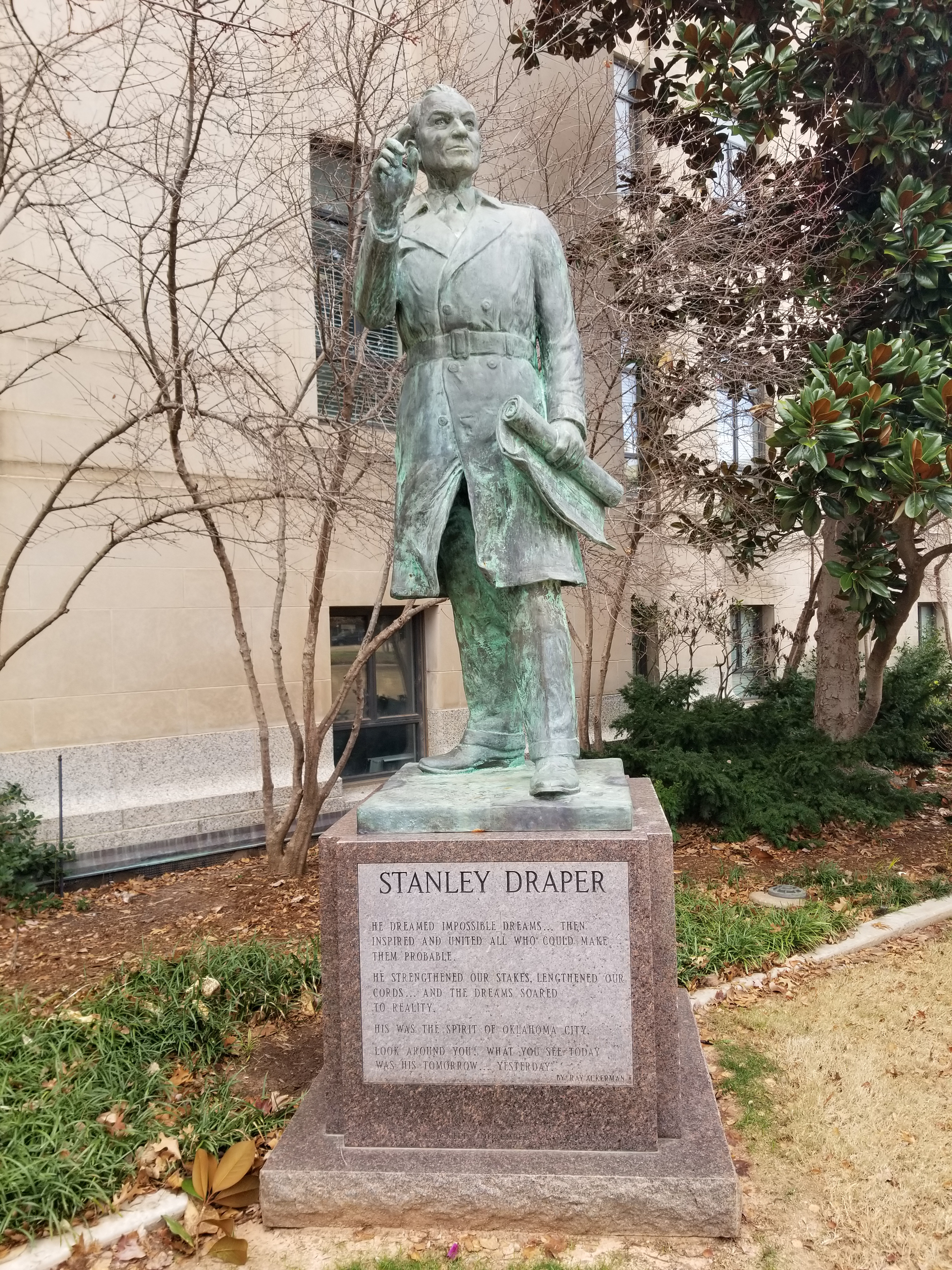
- A statue of Stanley Draper in Oklahoma City.

Managing Director of OKC Chamber of Commerce
- In office 1930–1960

Personal details
- Born: Stanley Carlisle Draper; November 21, 1889 Lasker, North Carolina, U.S.
- Died: January 8, 1976 (aged 86) Oklahoma City, Oklahoma, U.S.
- Cause of death: Heart failure
- Resting place: Rose Hill Burial Park, Oklahoma City, Oklahoma
- Party: Democratic

Military service
- Allegiance: United States
- Branch/service: United States Army
- Years of service: 1914–1919
- Rank: First lieutenant

Stanley Carlisle Draper (November 21, 1889 – January 8, 1976) was an American community leader responsible for the growth of Oklahoma City into a regional power during the mid-20th century. Together with Edward K. Gaylord, and other prominent members of the Oklahoma City Chamber of Commerce, he was able to shape the city into its present form. He was instrumental in the creation of Tinker Air Force Base, the Federal Aviation Administration Center, Will Rogers World Airport, Lake Hefner, the National Cowboy & Western Heritage Museum, and many infrastructure projects key to establishing Oklahoma City as a transportation hub.

Lake Stanley Draper holds his namesake after his plan for a reservoir near Tinker Air Force Base came to fruition. He was known for his sometimes utopian and superfluous ideas on city planning, resulting in massive annexations of the area surrounding the city. One of his failed visions included an attempt to expand the city borders across the state to Tulsa, Oklahoma creating an Oklahoma megalopolis. This led to Oklahoma City growing to become one of the most extensive cities in the United States.

== Early years ==
Draper was born on a farm in Lasker, North Carolina. His family was of Scotch-Irish descent and he was one of nine children. He earned a certificate of teaching before attending Shenandoah University. After graduation, he enrolled at The University of Chicago before dropping out to enlist in the United States Army during World War 1.

== Impact on Oklahoma City ==
Draper arrived in Oklahoma City after being discharged from the Army in 1919. His arrival in the city was prompted by a job offer to help lead the struggling Chamber of Commerce. One of his first matters of business was relocating the cluttered railroad tracks downtown and securing funds to build a grand Union Station. This station still stands on the grounds of the modern-day Scissortail Park. He further expanded Oklahoma City's access to other major cities by securing federal funds to build freeways through the city. One such freeway was a route from El Paso, Texas to Buffalo, New York, today's U.S. Route 62, which would become the basis for two future cross-country interstate highways. He spent many of his summers living in Washington D.C. lobbying for federal funds and establishing connections with Washington elites. His connections were used to great effect as he nearly singlehandedly convinced the Federal Government to change aviation routes to fly through Oklahoma City's new airport.

After World War II the United States Air Force was deciding between Wichita, Kansas, and Oklahoma City as the site for a new base. Draper used private and public funds to buy land around Midwest Air Depot while offering massive incentives to the Air Force. Reports state that he was even responsible for bailing out unruly Air Force officials from prison and ensuring records of their offenses were erased from the public record. Oklahoma City ultimately won the bid to build the new base. Today, Tinker Air Force Base is the largest single-site employer in Oklahoma with over 55,000 jobs that can be attributed to the base.

Draper was known as a master of publicity who would stage public stunts such as the New Land Run which was a demonstration of the Land Rush of 1889 to draw in tourism. Such demonstrations were vital in the establishment of Oklahoma City as a convention hub during the mid-20th century. One of his wilder ideas for the city was to make an artificial mountain near downtown that would serve as a focal point for the city's image. He retired from the Chamber of Commerce in 1968 after several decades and positions within the organization. He continued to advocate for the city until his death.

== Death and legacy ==
Draper died of heart failure on January 8, 1976, at St. Anthony's Hospital in Oklahoma City. His half-century-plus dedication to Oklahoma City was instrumental in the massive growth that the city saw during the middle part of the 20th century. The city nearly quadrupled in population during his life with much of today's growth being directly attributed to his labor and ruthless dedication to improving the economic opportunities of the city. Many critics accuse Draper of using dictatorial tactics to supersede the state and municipal governments to accomplish his visions. He used his political and media connections to raise funds that government entities couldn't while suppressing any negative discourse about his actions in the papers and radio. His supporters claim these tactics were essential in the creation of a modern metropolitan area and are the sole reason for Oklahoma City's current cultural and economic stature within the United States.
