= 1936 United States Senate election in Oklahoma =

- November 3, 1936
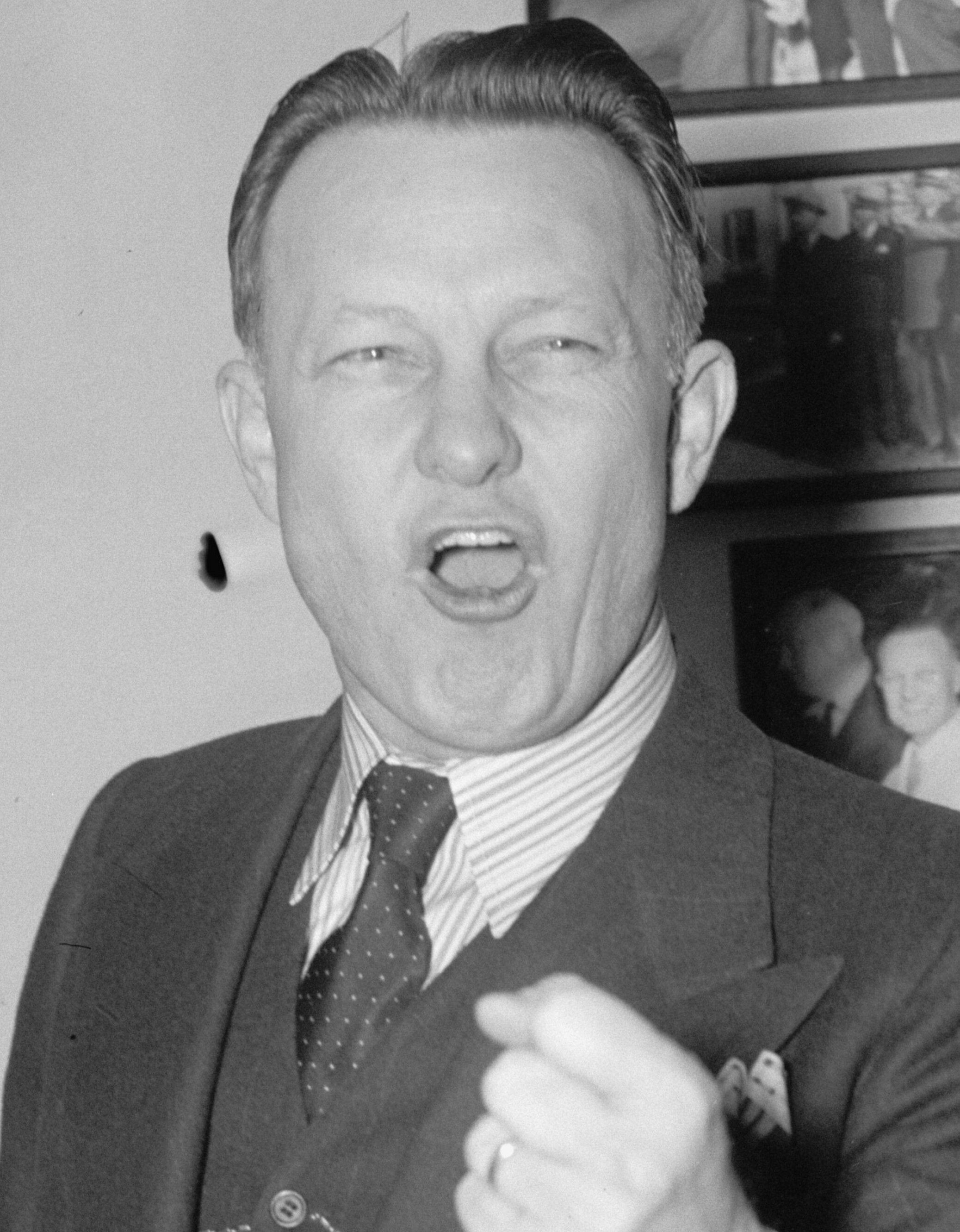

Nominee	Joshua B. Lee	Herbert K. Hyde
Party	Democratic	Republican
Popular vote	493,407	229,004
Percentage	67.97%	31.55%
- County results Lee: 50–60% 60–70% 70–80% 80–90% Hyde: 50–60%
U.S. senator before election
Thomas Gore
Democratic
Elected U.S. Senator
Joshua B. Lee
Democratic

The 1936 United States Senate election in Oklahoma took place on November 3, 1936. Incumbent Democratic Senator Thomas Gore ran for re-election to his second consecutive term, and fifth term overall. He ended up easily losing renomination, however; he placed a distant fourth in the Democratic primary. A runoff election between Congressman Joshua B. Lee and Governor Ernest W. Marland resulted in a landslide win for Lee. In the general election, Lee faced Republican nominee Herbert K. Hyde, whom he overwhelmingly defeated.

== Democratic primary ==
=== Candidates ===
- Joshua B. Lee, U.S. Congressman from Oklahoma's 5th congressional district
- E. W. Marland, Governor of Oklahoma
- Gomer Smith, attorney
- Thomas Gore, incumbent U.S. Senator
- Herndon J. Thompson
- J. L. Barnard
- Charles T. Kirtley
- Daniel O. Witmer

=== Results ===
Democratic primary
Party	Candidate	Votes	%
Democratic	Joshua B. Lee	168,030	33.07%
Democratic	E. W. Marland	121,433	23.90%
Democratic	Gomer Smith	119,585	23.53%
Democratic	Thomas Gore (inc.)	91,581	18.02%
Democratic	Herndon J. Thompson	2,222	0.44%
Democratic	J. L. Barnard	2,167	0.43%
Democratic	Charles T. Kirtley	1,564	0.31%
Democratic	Daniel O. Witmer	1,560	0.31%
Total votes		508,142	100.00%

=== Runoff election results ===
Democratic primary runoff
Party	Candidate	Votes	%
Democratic	Joshua B. Lee	301,259	61.71%
Democratic	E. W. Marland	186,899	38.29%
Total votes		488,158	100.00%

== Republican primary ==
=== Candidates ===
- Herbert K. Hyde, former U.S. Attorney
- Horace G. McKeever, Enid attorney
- Robert W. Kellough
- Frank A. Anderson
- Remington Rogers
- Ed Arnold
- Amos Wilson
- Orlando Swain

=== Results ===
Republican primary
Party	Candidate	Votes	%
Republican	Herbert K. Hyde	26,651	36.71%
Republican	Horace G. McKeever	11,742	16.17%
Republican	Robert W. Kellough	8,123	11.19%
Republican	Frank A. Anderson	7,699	10.60%
Republican	Remington Rogers	6,653	9.16%
Republican	Ed Arnold	4,399	6.06%
Republican	Amos Wilson	4,029	5.55%
Republican	Orlando Swain	3,303	4.55%
Total votes		72,599	100.00%

Though a runoff election was scheduled between Hyde and McKeever, McKeever withdrew from the race on July 13, 1936, ceding the nomination to Hyde.

=== Runoff election results ===
Republican primary runoff
Party	Candidate	Votes	%
Republican	Herbert K. Hyde	43,272	100.00%
Total votes		43,272	100.00%

== General election ==
=== Results ===
1936 United States Senate election in Oklahoma
Party	Candidate	Votes	%	±%
Democratic	Joshua B. Lee	493,407	67.97%	+15.68%
Republican	Herbert K. Hyde	229,004	31.55%	−15.99%
Socialist	Edgar Clemons	1,895	0.26%	—
Prohibition	P. C. Nelson	973	0.13%	—
Independent	Frank M. Kimes	344	0.05%	—
Independent	R. M. Funk	298	0.04%	—
Majority		264,403	36.42%	+31.67%
Turnout		725,921		
Democratic hold				
