= Joshua B. Lee =

American politician

Joshua Lee
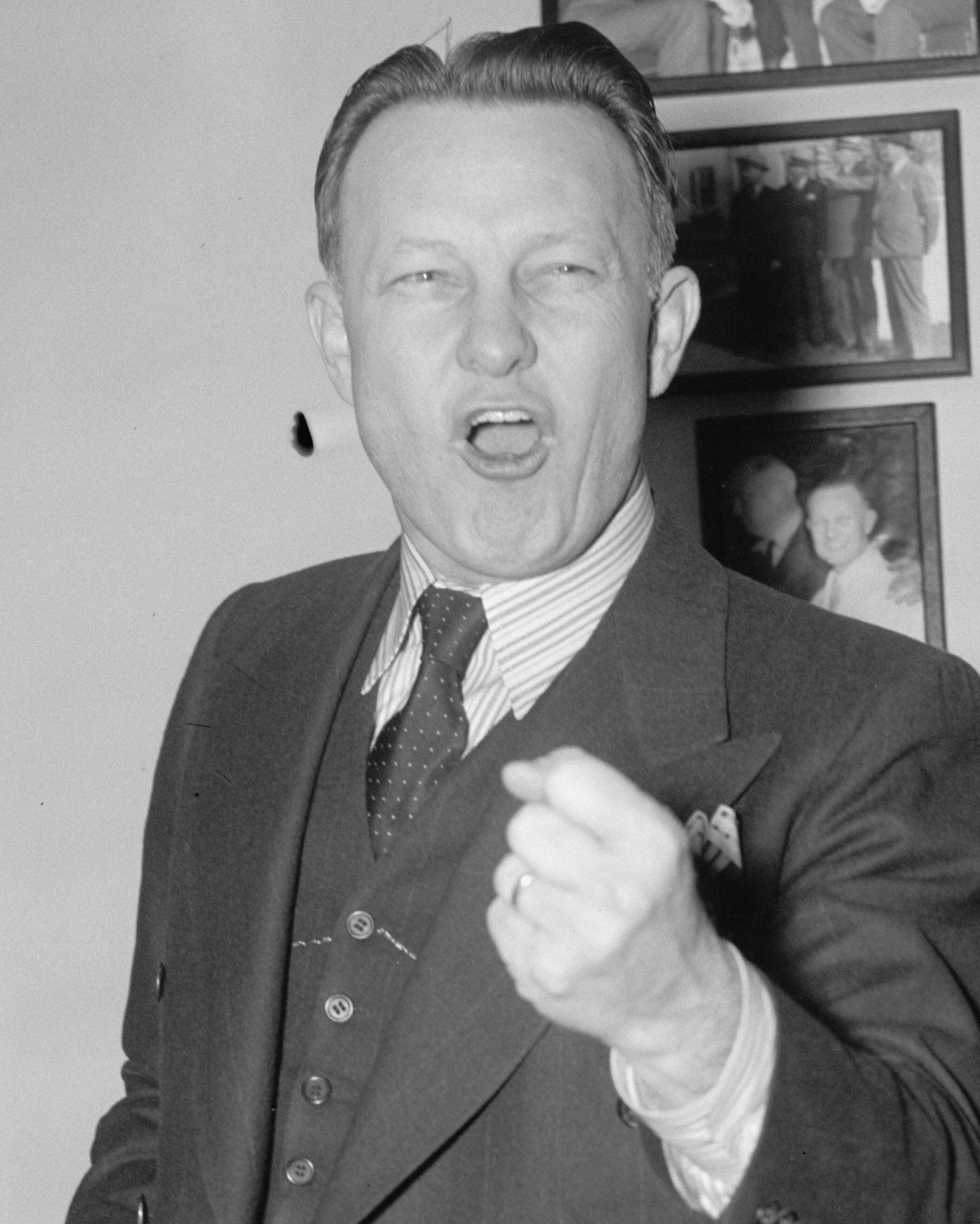
- Lee in 1937 by Harris & Ewing

Secretary of the Senate Democratic Conference
- In office 1937–1943
- Leader: Alben W. Barkley
- Preceded by: Hugo Black
- Succeeded by: Francis T. Maloney

United States Senator from Oklahoma
- In office January 3, 1937 – January 3, 1943
- Preceded by: Thomas Gore
- Succeeded by: Edward H. Moore

Member of the U.S. House of Representatives from Oklahoma's 5th district
- In office January 3, 1935 – January 3, 1937
- Preceded by: Fletcher B. Swank
- Succeeded by: Robert P. Hill

Personal details
- Born: Joshua Bryan Lee; January 23, 1892 Childersburg, Alabama, U.S.
- Died: August 10, 1967 (aged 75) Norman, Oklahoma, U.S.
- Party: Democratic
- Education: Oklahoma Baptist University; University of Oklahoma (BA); Columbia University (MA); Cumberland University (LLB)

Military service
- Allegiance: United States
- Branch/service: United States Army
- Years of service: 1917–1918
- Unit: 135th Infantry, 34th Division

Joshua Bryan Lee (January 23, 1892 – August 10, 1967) was a United States representative and senator from Oklahoma.

== Early life ==
Lee was born in Childersburg, Alabama on January 23, 1892. He moved to Pauls Valley, Oklahoma (then Indian Territory), and Kiowa County, Oklahoma (near Hobart, Oklahoma) in 1901. He attended the public schools of Hobart and Rocky, Oklahoma and the Oklahoma Baptist University at Shawnee. He was a teacher in the public schools of Rocky from 1911 to 1913 and was a coach of athletics and teacher of public speaking at the Oklahoma Baptist University, 1913–1915; he graduated from the University of Oklahoma at Norman in 1917, and received a graduate degree in political science from Columbia University in 1924, and a law degree from Cumberland School of Law at Cumberland University (Tennessee) in 1925. He was initiated into the Mu chapter of Phi Mu Alpha Sinfonia music fraternity in 1917.

During the First World War, Joshua Lee served overseas as a private in the One Hundred and Thirty-fifth Infantry, Thirty-fourth Division, in 1917 and 1918. From 1919 to 1934, he was head of the public speaking department of the University of Oklahoma, and was also an author and lecturer. His first publication was The Battle of Cognac, published in October 1919 by Harlow Publishing Corporation, and republished as a hard cover in 1948 by the same company. Illustrations for the book were contributed by Ruth Monro Augar.

During the latter part of the war, Lee joined the entertainment troop. By 1948, he owned and operated a ranch in western Oklahoma and a farm near Norman.

== Political career ==
He was elected as a Democrat to the Seventy-fourth Congress (January 3, 1935 – January 3, 1937) and was not a candidate for renomination in 1936; he was then elected as a Democrat to the United States Senate and served from January 3, 1937, to January 3, 1943. He was an unsuccessful candidate for reelection in 1942, and was a member of the Civil Aeronautics Board from 1943 to 1955. He returned to Norman and practiced law; he died there in 1967.

U.S. House of Representatives
Preceded by Fletcher B. Swank	Member of the U.S. House of Representatives from Oklahoma's 5th congressional district 1935–1937	Succeeded by Robert P. Hill
Party political offices
Preceded by Thomas Gore	Democratic nominee for U.S. Senator from Oklahoma (Class 2); 1936, 1942	Succeeded by Robert S. Kerr
Preceded by Hugo Black	Secretary of the Senate Democratic Caucus; 1937–1943	Succeeded by Francis T. Maloney
U.S. Senate
Preceded by Thomas Gore	U.S. Senator (Class 2) from Oklahoma; 1937–1943; Served alongside: Elmer Thomas	Succeeded by Edward H. Moore
