= Lake Hefner =

Reservoir

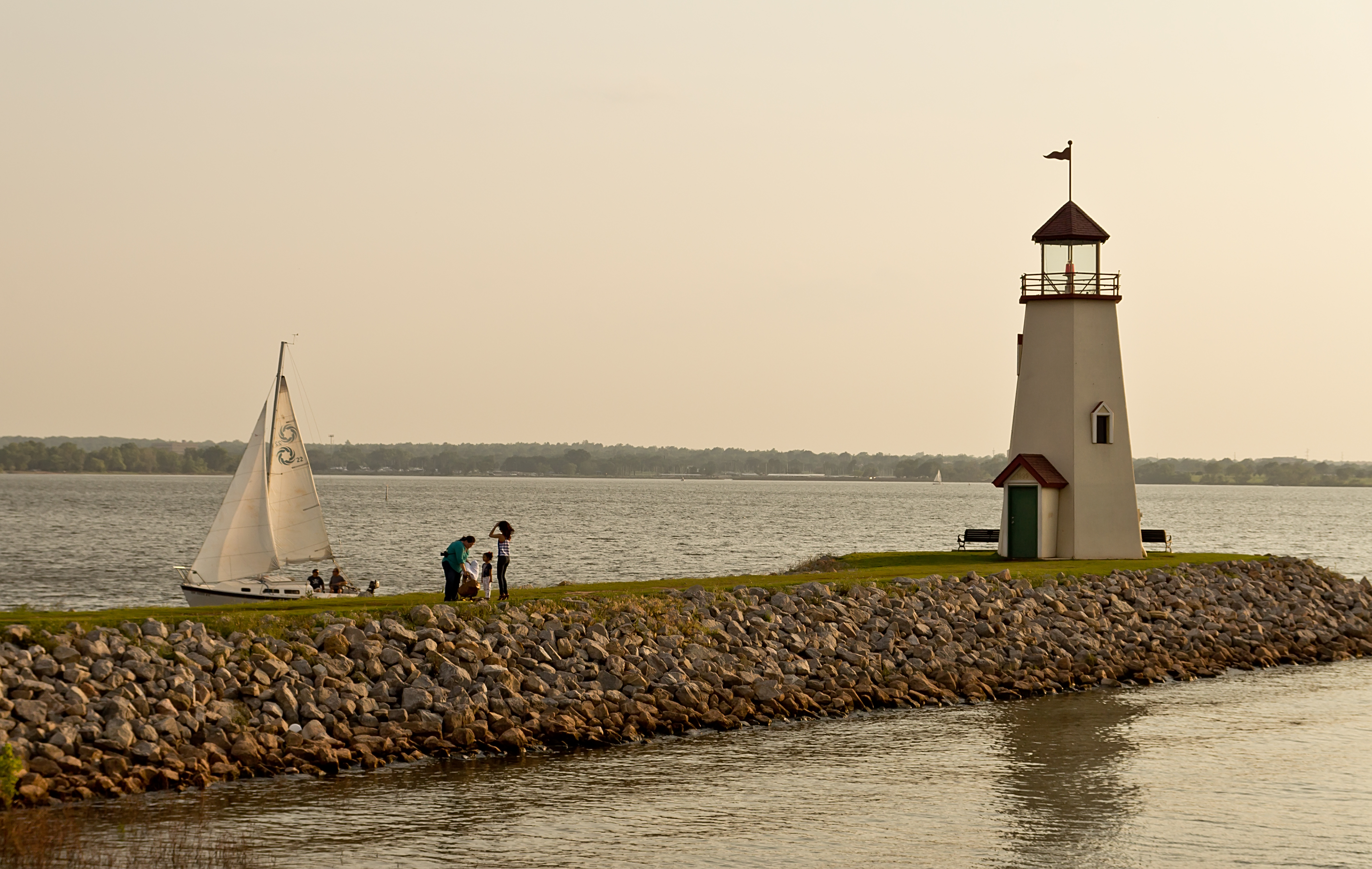

- Location within Oklahoma Location within the United States
- Location: Oklahoma City, Oklahoma
- Coordinates: 35°34′04″N 97°35′45″W
- Lake type: reservoir
- Basin countries: United States
- Surface area: 2,500 acres (1,000 ha)
- Average depth: 29 ft (8.8 m)
- Max. depth: 94 ft (29 m)
- Water volume: 75,000 acre⋅ft (93,000,000 m^{3})
- Surface elevation: 1,201 ft (366 m)
- Settlements: Oklahoma City, Oklahoma

Lake Hefner is a reservoir in northwestern Oklahoma City, Oklahoma. It was built in the 1940s to expand the water supply for the city of Oklahoma City,

It is named after Robert A. Hefner, who served as mayor of Oklahoma City from April 11, 1939, to April 8, 1947, but was originally named the "Bluff Creek Reservoir." It also serves as a major recreational destination, as it is surrounded by 9.5 miles (15.3 km) of multi-use (bicycle, skating and pedestrian) trails. Stanley Draper was influential in securing the funding to develop the lake.

== Description ==
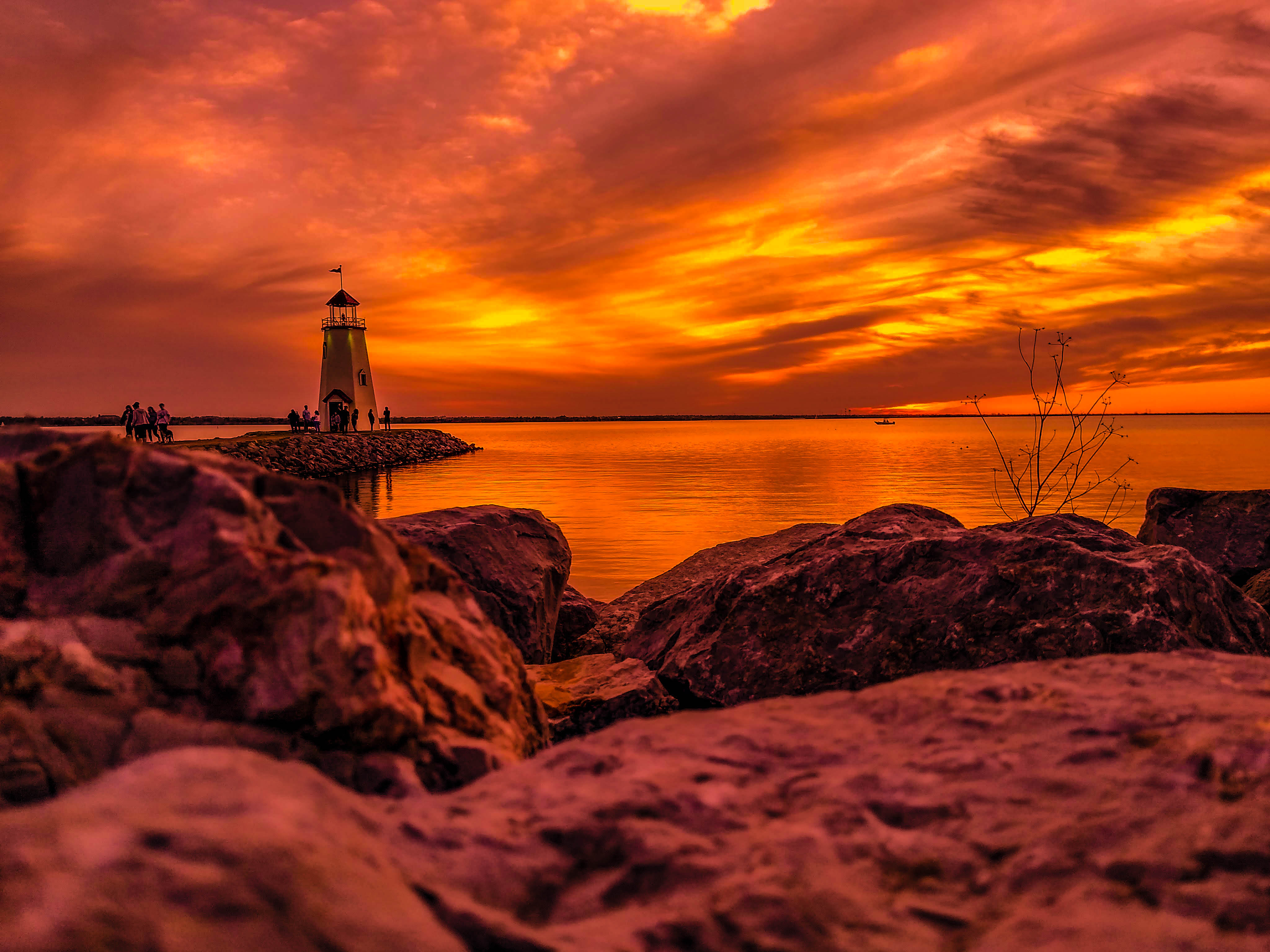
Lake Hefner March 2020

The capacity of the lake is 75,000 acre-feet. Lake Hefner covers 2,500 acres (10 km^{2}) and averages 29 feet (8.8 m) deep. The lake's outflow goes into Bluff Creek which travels north to meet up with Deer Creek, which then flows into the Cimarron River near Guthrie.

The lake is situated within the Oklahoma City urban area and is subsequently closely bordered by residential areas to the north, west, and east. The Lake Hefner Dam is located along the entire northern side of the lake (with Bluff Creek Park being located below the dam, on the other side of Hefner boulevard). Lake Hefner Parkway borders the east side of the lake, with some commercial development (including restaurants, bars and office buildings) located alongside the lake, as well as a 36-foot tall working replica of the second oldest lighthouse in the United States, the Brant Point Light near Nantucket, Massachusetts. The south side of the lake is the least developed, retaining the original forest along much of the shore. Lake Hefner Golf Course is located on the southwest corner of the lake. Immediately south of this are the Oklahoma City docks, commonly known as the city-side docks, the largest marina on the lake. The other marina on Lake Hefner is the Oklahoma City Boat Club (OCBC), a private organization that holds weekly sailboat races during the summer and is located on the east side. Just north of the OCBC is the East Wharf area, which contains several fairly upscale restaurants. On the south side of the lake is the Hobie Point, a YMCA sailing school, and Stars and Stripes Park. Stars and Stripes Park also has new additions of a Fitness court and a Skatepark. The Oklahoma Radio Kontrol Society (TORKS) has maintained a Radio Control air field since the early 1970s.

== Recreation ==
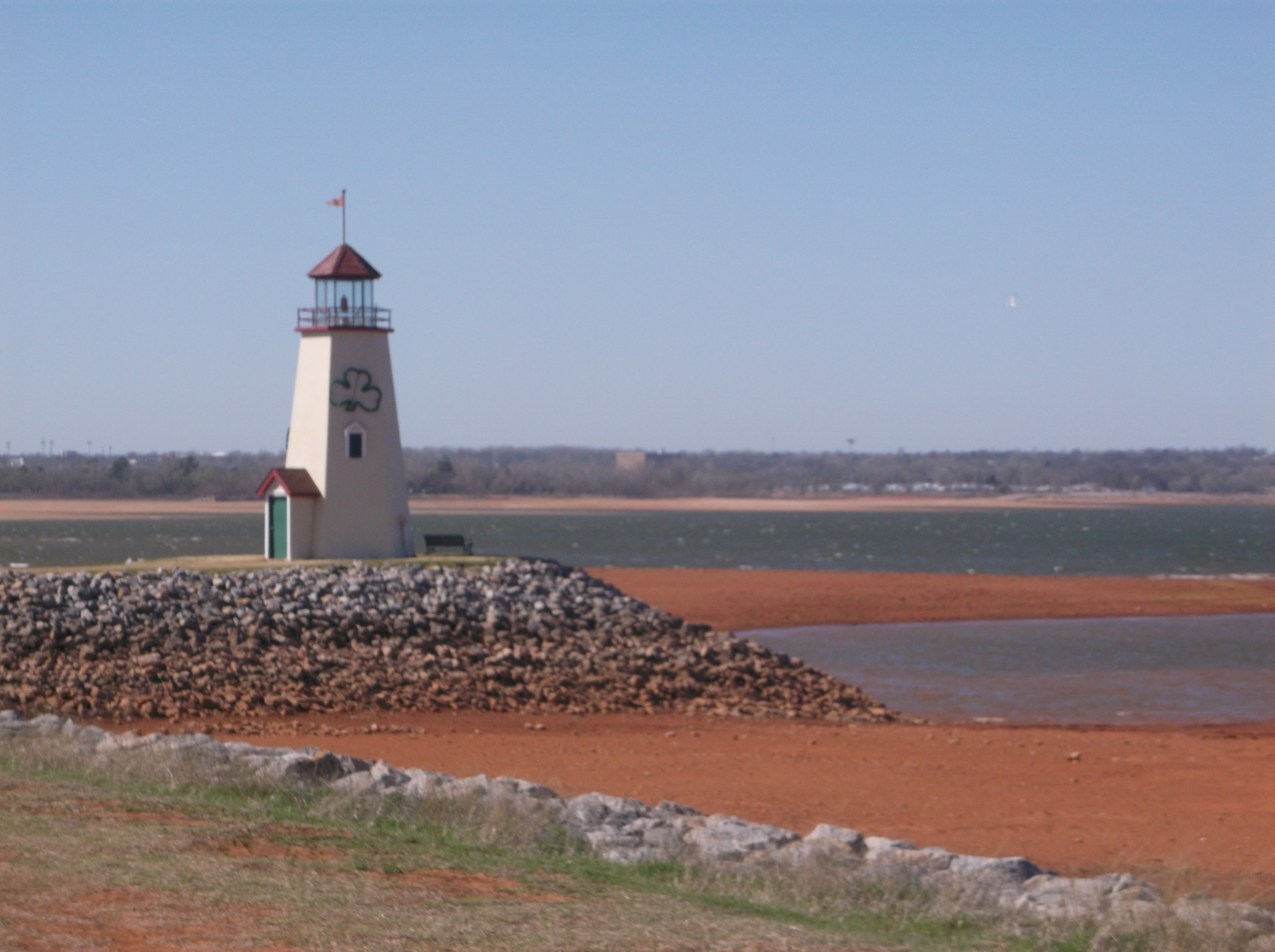
The lighthouse at Lake Hefner during a drought

Hefner is also a popular recreational fishing spot for Oklahoma City residents, and is populated with a variety of gamefish species including largemouth & smallmouth bass, channel catfish, walleye, bluegill, black crappie, as well as white bass and hybrid striped bass.

Additionally, Hefner is a popular site for recreational boating, both with sailboats and motorized pleasure craft. Kiteboarding is also very popular on Hefner due to the excellent wind they receive all summer.
