= Jewell, Ohio =

Unincorporated community in Ohio, U.S.

Coordinates: 41°19′33″N 84°17′08″W

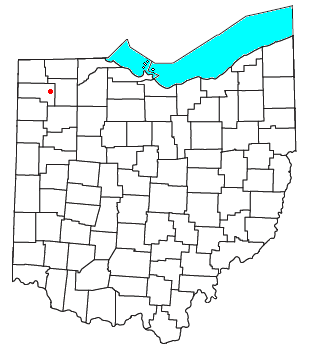
Location of Jewell, Ohio

Jewell is an unincorporated community in northern Richland Township, Defiance County, Ohio, United States. It has a post office with the ZIP code 43530. It is located at the intersection of County Roads 55 and 185, a short distance southeast of U.S. Route 24.
