= Robert S. Kerr =

American politician

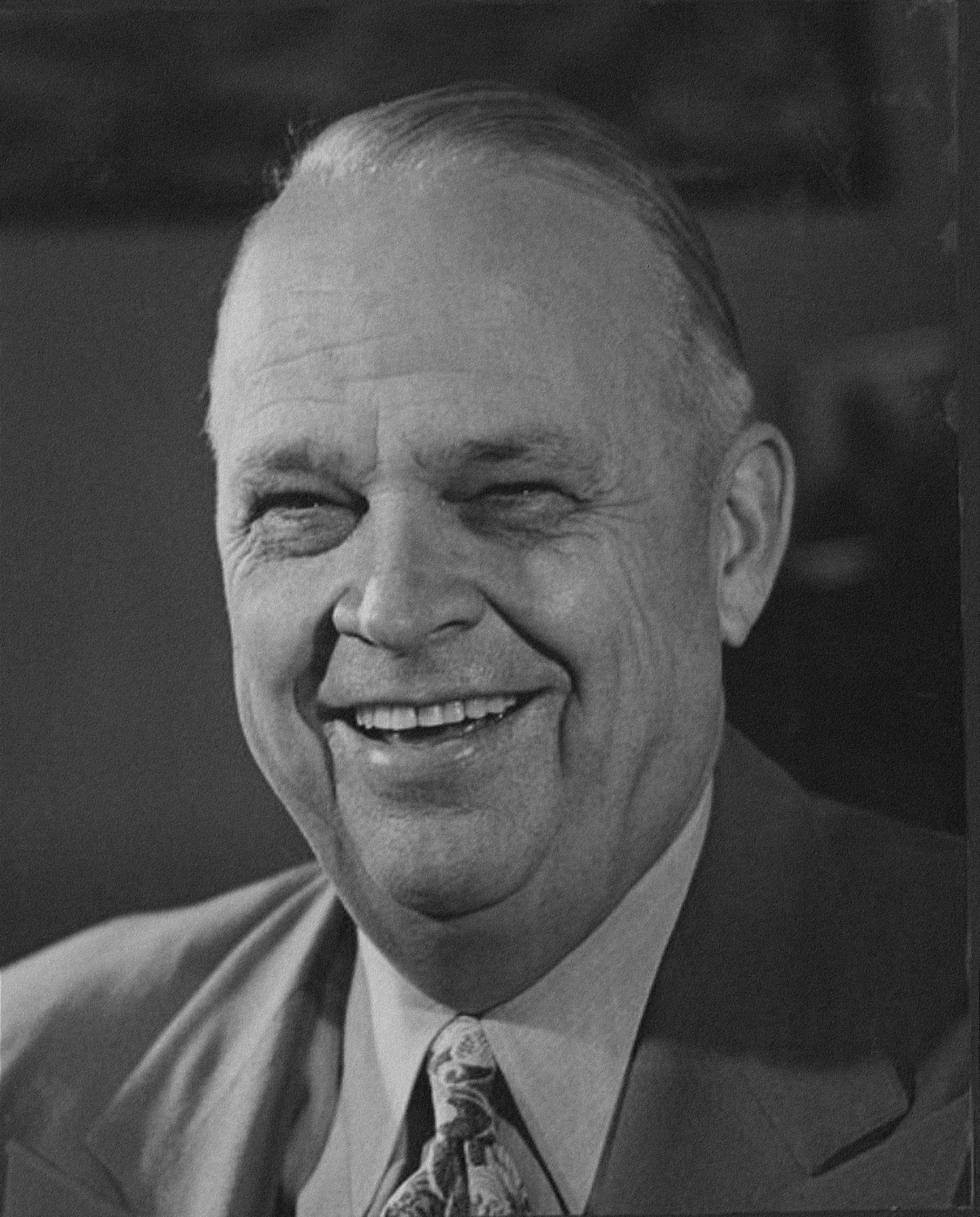
- Kerr in 1956

United States Senator from Oklahoma
- In office January 3, 1949 – January 1, 1963
- Preceded by: Edward H. Moore
- Succeeded by: J. Howard Edmondson

12th Governor of Oklahoma
- In office January 11, 1943 – January 13, 1947
- Lieutenant: James E. Berry
- Preceded by: Leon C. Phillips
- Succeeded by: Roy J. Turner

Personal details
- Born: Robert Samuel Kerr; September 11, 1896 Pontotoc County, Indian Territory
- Died: January 1, 1963 (aged 66) Washington, D.C., U.S.
- Party: Democratic
- Spouses: Reba Shelton (m. 1919; died 1924) Grayce Breene (m. 1925)
- Relations: Travis M. Kerr (brother); Robert S. Kerr III (grandson)
- Children: 4
- Education: East Central University (BA)

Military service
- Allegiance: United States
- Branch/service: United States Army
- Unit: Oklahoma National Guard
- Battles/wars: World War I

Robert Samuel Kerr (September 11, 1896 – January 1, 1963) was an American businessman and politician from Oklahoma. Kerr formed a petroleum company before turning to politics. He served as the 12th governor of Oklahoma from 1943 to 1947 and was elected three times to the United States Senate. Kerr worked natural resources, and his legacy includes water projects that link the Arkansas River via the Gulf of Mexico. He was the first Oklahoma governor born in the territory of the state.

== Early life ==
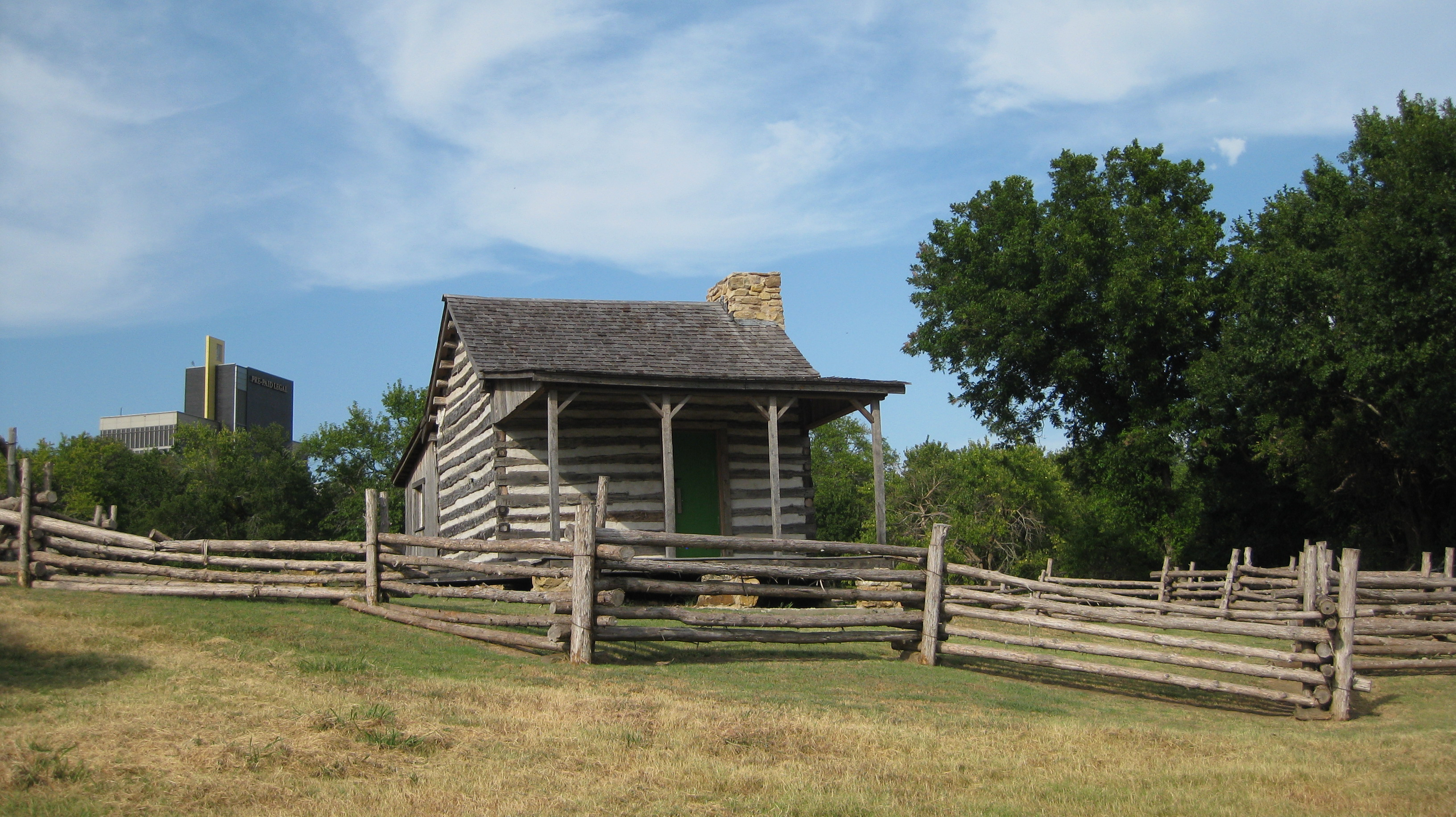
Kerr was born in this cabin near Ada, Oklahoma.

Kerr was born in a log cabin in Pontotoc County — near what is now Ada — in Indian Territory, the son of William Samuel Kerr, a farmer, clerk, and politician, and Margaret Eloda Wright. Kerr's upbringing as a Southern Baptist had a profound influence on his life. Not only did his religious beliefs lead him to teach Sunday school and to shun alcohol throughout his adulthood, it also aided his political aspirations in a conservative state where Baptists were the single largest denomination. He enrolled at Oklahoma Baptist University in Shawnee as a junior in high school. He later attended and graduated from East Central Normal School in Ada. He briefly studied law at the University of Oklahoma until poverty forced him to drop out in 1916. When the United States entered World War I in 1917, Kerr was commissioned as a second lieutenant in the army. He never saw combat, but he used his active involvement in the Oklahoma National Guard and the American Legion to forward his business and political careers. He then returned to study law under an Ada judge. Kerr passed the bar exam in 1922, but a business failure the previous year had left him deeply in debt. In 1924, his wife of more than four years, Reba Shelton, died in childbirth, along with his twin daughters. The next year he married Grayce Breene, the youngest daughter of a wealthy Tulsa family. They had four children.

Kerr used his new family connections to enter the oil business with his brother-in-law, James L. Anderson, as his partner. By 1929 the Anderson-Kerr Drilling Company had become so prosperous that Kerr abandoned his law practice to focus on oil. Anderson retired in 1936, and Dean A. McGee, former chief geologist for Phillips Petroleum, joined the firm, which changed its name in 1946 to Kerr-McGee Oil Industries, Incorporated. Kerr-McGee diversified into global drilling for petroleum and processed other fuels and minerals, including uranium and helium.

== Political career ==
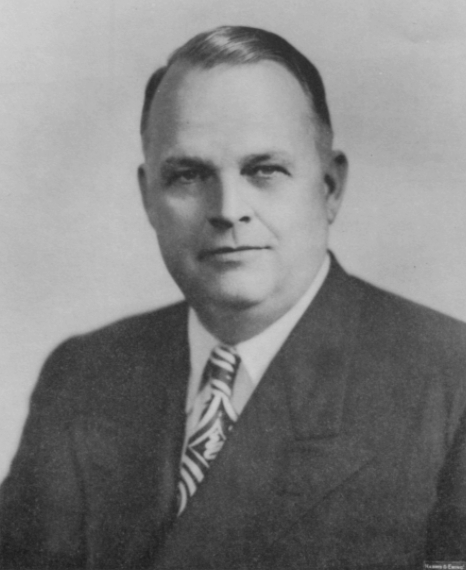
Kerr as governor

Kerr's growing wealth and business ties made him a power in state Democratic politics during the 1930s. He worked to raise funds for both Governors E.W. Marland and Leon C. Phillips. In 1940, he was elected as Democratic national committeeman for Oklahoma. Two years later he ran for the Democratic nomination for governor, campaigning as a supporter both of the New Deal and of a vigorous American role in World War II. Oklahoma's Democrats were divided over US President Franklin Roosevelt's policies, leading to a bitter campaign. Kerr narrowly won the primary and went on to win by a small margin in the general election. He was the first native-born governor.

Kerr's four-year term as governor served as a turning point for Oklahoma's politics and economy. For the first time in the state's history, executive-legislative relations remained cordial, largely due to Kerr's patient leadership. When not cultivating legislators, the governor prepared his state to weather postwar economic storms. Kerr traveled more than 400,000 miles to sell Oklahoma's products and potential throughout the nation. Not coincidentally, Kerr's boosterism also promoted his own political fortunes. In 1944 he was chosen to deliver the keynote address at the Democratic National Convention, where he played a back-room role in the selection of Harry S. Truman as vice president. During World War II, despite the tendency of Oklahomans to keep the federal government at arm's length, Kerr promoted ties to the government, knowing how important the jobs and activity were to create prosperity. Oklahoma became home to many wartime industries and was a training site for military personnel. After the war, he called for increased spending to allow for post-war development of the state. Kerr traveled around the country to promote Oklahoma at his own expense.

Kerr was among 12 nominated at the 1944 Democratic National Convention to serve as Roosevelt's running mate in the presidential election that year. He used his success as governor to catapult himself into the U.S. Senate in 1948. Although Kerr had national ambitions, he always put what he considered to be the interests of his state first. Unlike many of his peers he generally neglected headline-grabbing issues, including anticommunism, foreign affairs, and civil rights (although Kerr did not sign the 1956 Southern Manifesto and voted in favor of the Civil Rights Act of 1957 and the 24th Amendment to the US Constitution), in favor of more mundane topics such as oil policies and public works. He believed Oklahomans would benefit most, and support him strongly, if he concentrated on concrete economic matters.

In a closely-contested race, Kerr became the first Oklahoma governor elected to the Senate. He had Presidential aspirations briefly in 1952, but he failed to win the Democratic nomination. Instead he devoted his energies to building his Senate career.

Kerr's activism on natural gas regulation quickly won him a reputation among his colleagues for being a staunch defender of his region and its special interests, including his own petroleum company. His personality reinforced these first impressions. Kerr's colleagues widely considered him a brilliant debater who overwhelmed his opponents with his passion and his mastery of policy detail.

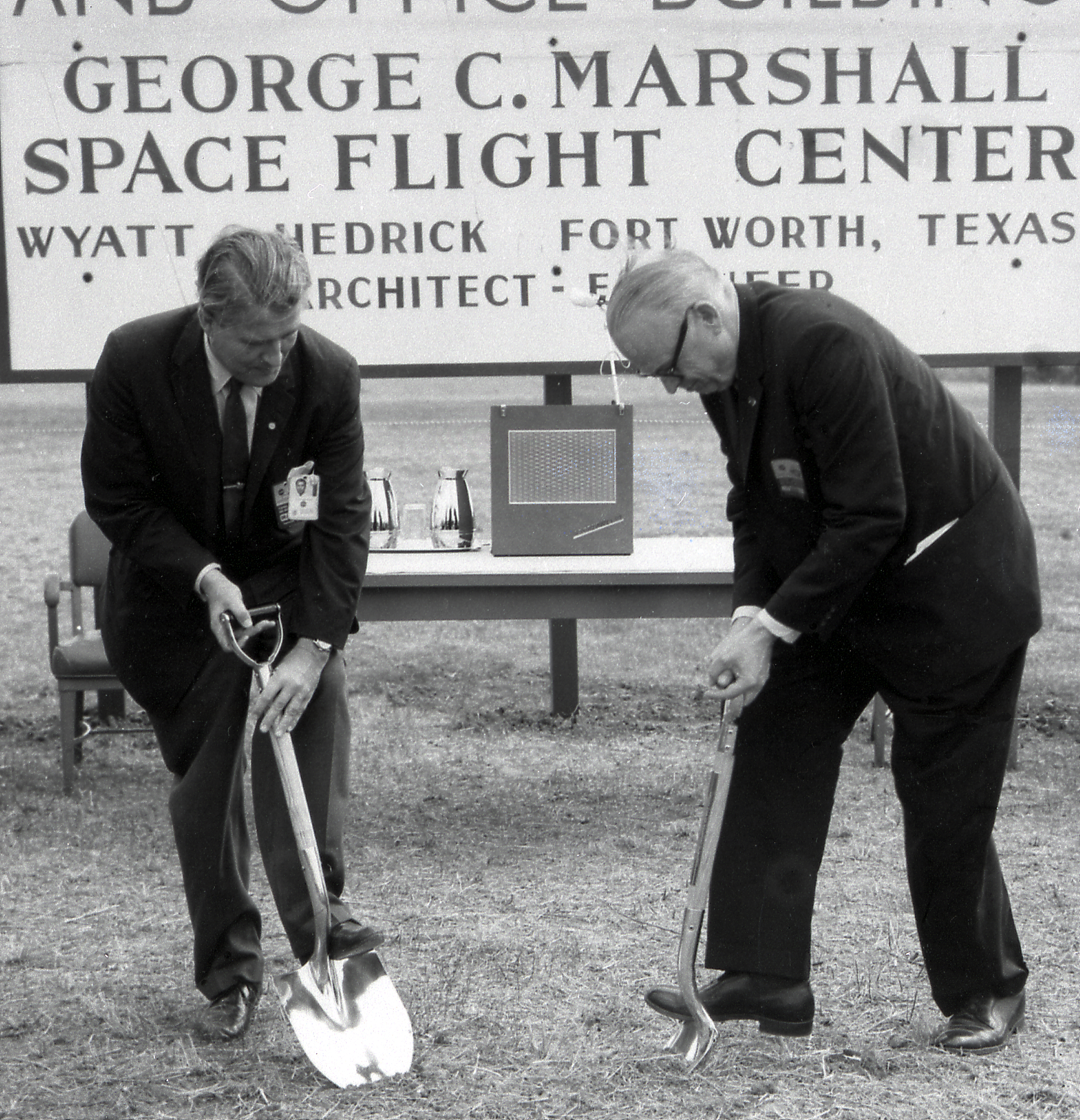
Wernher von Braun and Kerr, a chairman of the Senate Committee on Aeronautical and Space Sciences, break ground for Marshall Space Flight Center's new Central Laboratory and Office Facility in 1961.

Following the 1952 disappointment, Kerr abandoned all hopes of becoming a presidential candidate and threw himself completely into his legislative work. He built alliances with the powerful southern and western Democrats who dominated the Senate, including Richard Russell of Georgia and Lyndon Johnson of Texas. On these friends he relied heavily. He also relied on careful committee preparation to pursue regional economic development.

The Arkansas River Navigation System (better known as the McClellan-Kerr Arkansas River Navigation System) became Kerr's defining goal through his three terms in the Senate. This $1.2 billion federal project, centered in northeastern Oklahoma, fostered more than $3 billion in commercial and industrial development in the Arkansas River basin during the two years after its completion in 1971. A once stagnant portion of Oklahoma quickly emerged as a regional economic hub.

Kerr served, in addition, on several key Senate committees, most notably the Finance and Public Works committees. He chaired the United States Senate Committee on Aeronautical and Space Sciences from 1961 to his death, and delivered a keynote speech at the June 1962 dedication of Space Park in California.

As a petroleum executive, Kerr championed petroleum and natural gas interests and advocated for the conservation of natural resources. His father had told him, "To raise a family, you have to have three things – land, wood and water."

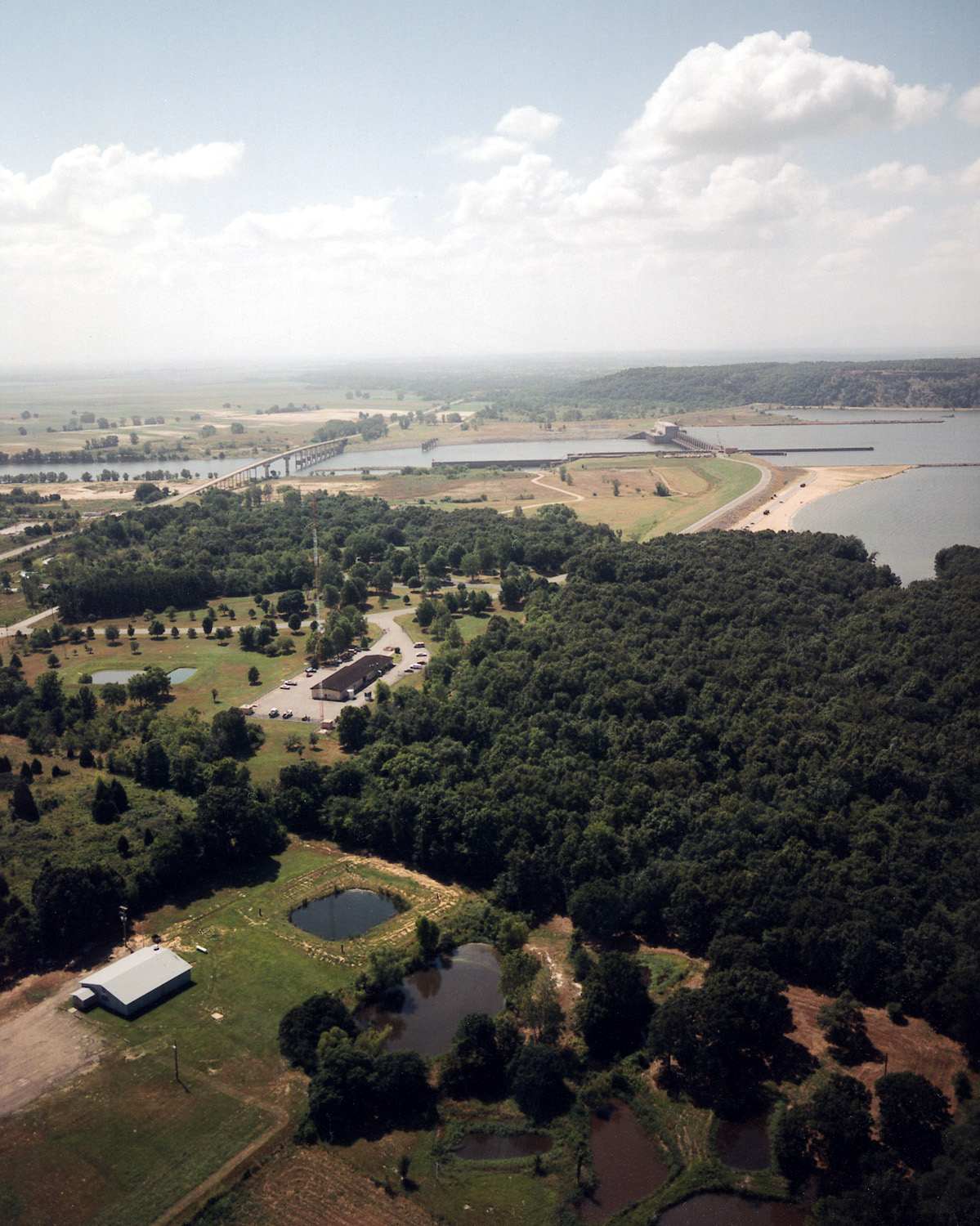
An aerial view of the Robert S. Kerr Lock and Dam that forms Robert S. Kerr Reservoir on the Arkansas River in Oklahoma. The Kerr-McClellan Arkansas River Navigation System is co-named to honor Kerr for his role in obtaining funding and legislation to build the system.

The legislative acumen that Kerr displayed, combined with changes in congressional leadership, had the effect of increasing his importance to John F. Kennedy as an ally for programs on Capitol Hill. On issues of common interest, such as space and taxes, Kerr co-operated with Kennedy to guarantee mutual success; but on areas of disagreement, including Medicare, Kerr stymied the president. In January 1963, The Wall Street Journal summarized the relationship with only some exaggeration: "Mr. Kennedy asked; Mr. Kerr decided."

=== Death ===
In December 1962, Kerr was hospitalized in Washington for a respiratory illness, and was also found to have coronary artery disease; he died there from a heart attack on January 1, 1963, at the age of 66. Shortly after he died, an article written by an Associated Press reporter agreed with the title of The Saturday Evening Post tribute. Both called Kerr "The Uncrowned King of the Senate." He was first buried at Rosehill Cemetery in Oklahoma City, but his body was later moved to the Kerr homestead in Ada, Oklahoma.

== Legacy ==
Kerr's chief legacy for the state of Oklahoma is a series of water projects and dams that made the Arkansas River into a navigable inland waterway system. During his term as governor, Kerr witnessed the devastation caused by flooding of the Arkansas River and its tributaries due to the river's shallowness, which prevented river traffic from reaching Oklahoma. His first bill in Congress created the Arkansas, White and Red River Study Commission, which planned the land and water development in this region. He died before he saw the commission's work come to fruition as the McClellan-Kerr Arkansas River Navigation System, a series of 18 locks and dams making the waterway navigable from the Tulsa Port of Catoosa to the Mississippi River.

Dozens of Oklahoma schools, buildings, roads, streets, parks, organizations, and events are named in Kerr's honor. Most notable is a portion of 2nd Street, between E.K. Gaylord Avenue and Classen Boulevard in downtown Oklahoma City, called Robert S. Kerr Ave. The Carl Albert Center at the University of Oklahoma houses Kerr's papers from his years in the U.S. Senate, his gubernatorial papers and his speeches.

In 1956, Senator Kerr was inducted into the Oklahoma Hall of Fame.

Kerr's death contributed to Kennedy's legislative difficulties in 1963, marked the end of the Democratic party's dominance in Oklahoma politics, and signaled the passing of a major figure in the oil industry. But in addition to an estate estimated to be worth at least $35 million, he left a legacy that extended beyond partisan or business affairs. His forceful use of the federal government to spur regional development, an approach shared by contemporaries, including Johnson, helped integrate the South and Southwest into the national economy. The rise of the "Sunbelt" ultimately transformed all aspects of American life. Robert Kerr played a significant role in that transformation.

== Children ==
Robert Kerr's son Bill Kerr was a cofounder and major patron of the National Museum of Wildlife Art overlooking the National Elk Refuge in Jackson, Wyoming.

== See also ==
- Bust of Robert S. Kerr
- List of members of the United States Congress who died in office (1950–1999)

Party political offices
Preceded by Leon C. Phillips	Democratic nominee for Governor of Oklahoma; 1942	Succeeded by Roy J. Turner
Preceded by William B. Bankhead	Keynote Speaker of the Democratic National Convention; 1944	Succeeded by Alben W. Barkley
Preceded by Joshua B. Lee	Democratic nominee for U.S. Senator from Oklahoma (Class 2); 1948, 1954, 1960	Succeeded by Fred R. Harris
Political offices
Preceded by Leon C. Phillips	Governor of Oklahoma; 1943–1947	Succeeded by Roy J. Turner
U.S. Senate
Preceded by Edward H. Moore	U.S. Senator (Class 2) from Oklahoma; 1949–1963; Served alongside: Elmer Thomas, Mike Monroney	Succeeded by J. Howard Edmondson
Preceded by Lyndon B. Johnson	Chair of the Senate Space Committee; 1961–1963	Succeeded by Clinton Anderson
