= 1948 United States Senate election in Oklahoma =

- November 2, 1948
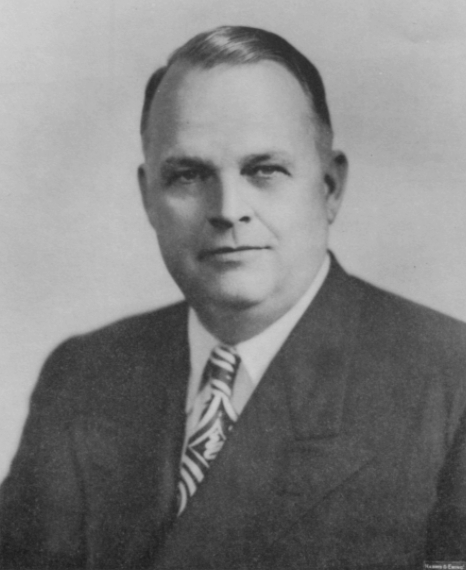

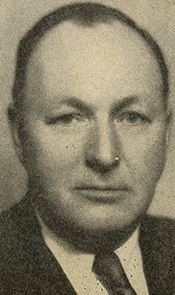
Nominee	Robert S. Kerr	Ross Rizley
Party	Democratic	Republican
Popular vote	441,654	265,169
Percentage	62.30%	37.40%
- County results Kerr: 40–50% 50–60% 60–70% 70–80% 80–90% >90% Rizley: 40–50% 50–60% 60–70%
U.S. senator before election
Edward H. Moore
Republican
Elected U.S. Senator
Robert S. Kerr
Democratic

The 1948 United States Senate election in Oklahoma took place on November 2, 1948. Incumbent Republican Senator Edward H. Moore declined to run for re-election. A crowded Democratic primary, including the former Governor, multiple members of Congress, and several statewide elected officials, developed; former Governor Robert S. Kerr won a slim plurality in the initial primary and then defeated former Congressman Gomer Smith by a wide margin in the runoff. On the Republican side, Congressman Ross Rizley had an easy path to the nomination. Kerr defeated Rizley in a landslide, largely similar to President Harry S. Truman's landslide victory in Oklahoma over Republican presidential nominee Thomas E. Dewey.

== Democratic primary ==
=== Candidates ===
- Robert S. Kerr, former Governor of Oklahoma
- Gomer Smith, former U.S. Congressman from Oklahoma's 5th congressional district
- Mac Q. Williamson, Attorney General of Oklahoma
- O. J. Fox, pension organizer
- Glen D. Johnson, U.S. Congressman from Oklahoma's 4th congressional district
- Wilburn Cartwright, Oklahoma Secretary of State
- James E. Berry, Lieutenant Governor of Oklahoma
- Fletcher Riley, Justice on the Oklahoma Supreme Court
- C. A. Gentry
- L. G. Burt

=== Results ===
Democratic primary
Party	Candidate	Votes	%
Democratic	Robert S. Kerr	135,878	37.41%
Democratic	Gomer Smith	73,511	20.24%
Democratic	Mac Q. Williamson	48,670	13.40%
Democratic	O. J. Fox	35,817	9.86%
Democratic	Glen D. Johnson	24,513	6.75%
Democratic	Wilburn Cartwright	19,153	5.27%
Democratic	James E. Berry	17,201	4.74%
Democratic	Fletcher Riley	3,721	1.02%
Democratic	C. A. Gentry	2,738	0.75%
Democratic	L. G. Burt	2,022	0.56%
Total votes		363,224	100.00%

=== Runoff election results ===
Democratic primary runoff
Party	Candidate	Votes	%
Democratic	Robert S. Kerr	168,861	57.56%
Democratic	Gomer Smith	124,519	42.44%
Total votes		293,380	100.00%

== Republican primary ==
=== Candidates ===
- Ross Rizley, U.S. Congressman from Oklahoma's 8th congressional district
- Henry J. Wallace
- Frank A. Anderson
- Homer Cowan
- Joseph Holt
- Rexford B. Cragg

=== Results ===
Republican primary
Party	Candidate	Votes	%
Republican	Ross Rizley	29,659	68.42%
Republican	Henry J. Wallace	3,429	7.91%
Republican	Frank A. Anderson	3,119	7.20%
Republican	Homer Cowan	2,985	6.89%
Republican	Joseph Holt	2,307	5.32%
Republican	Rexford B. Cragg	1,850	4.27%
Total votes		43,349	100.00%

== General election ==
=== Results ===
1948 United States Senate election in Oklahoma
Party	Candidate	Votes	%	±%
Democratic	Robert S. Kerr	441,654	62.30%	+17.54%
Republican	Ross Rizley	265,169	37.40%	−17.42%
Independent	W. O. Pratt	2,108	0.30%	—
Majority		176,485	24.89%	+14.82%
Turnout		708,931		
Democratic gain from Republican				
