= Roy J. Turner =

Governor of Oklahoma from 1947 to 1951

Roy Joseph Turner
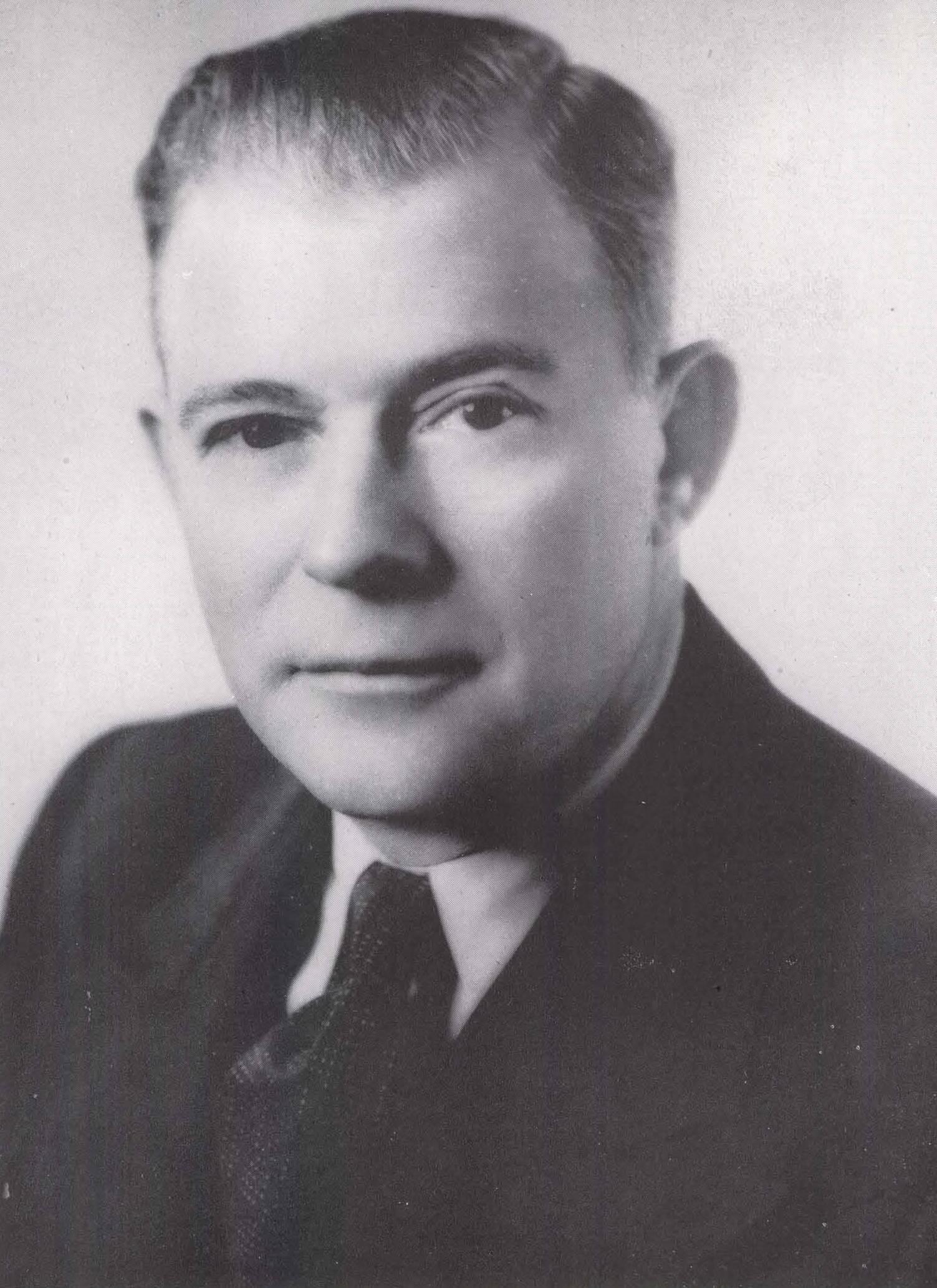

Treasurer of the Democratic National Committee
- In office December 13, 1951 – January 23, 1952
- Preceded by: Sidney Salomon Jr
- Succeeded by: Dwight R. G. Palmer

13th Governor of Oklahoma
- In office January 13, 1947 – January 8, 1951
- Lieutenant: James E. Berry
- Preceded by: Robert S. Kerr
- Succeeded by: Johnston Murray

Personal details
- Born: November 6, 1894 Lincoln County, Oklahoma Territory, US
- Died: June 11, 1973 (aged 78) Oklahoma City, Oklahoma, US
- Resting place: Rose Hill Burial Park; 35°31′53″N 97°32′12.8″W
- Party: Democratic
- Spouse: Jessica E. Grimm
- Children: 2
- Profession: businessman

Military service
- Allegiance: United States
- Branch/service: United States Army
- Battles/wars: World War I

Roy Joseph Turner (November 6, 1894 – June 11, 1973) was an American businessman and governor of the U.S. state of Oklahoma. Born in 1894 in Oklahoma Territory, he served in World War I, became a prominent businessman and eventually served as the 13th governor of Oklahoma from 1947 to 1951.

As governor, Turner helped establish the state turnpike system and college board of regents. He oversaw the end of segregation in Oklahoma's higher education system. He is buried in Oklahoma City.

== Early life ==
Turner was born on November 6, 1894, near Kendrick in Oklahoma Territory. Upon completion of his high school education, he attended Hill's Business College in Oklahoma City. He was a bookkeeper for Morris Parking Company in Oklahoma City from 1911 to 1915 and a salesman for the Goodyear Tire and Rubber Company there. He married Jessica E. Grimm in 1937 and they adopted two children.

== Career ==
After his service as a private in the United States Army during World War I, Turner was a dealer in real estate, principally in Oklahoma, Florida and Texas. By 1928, He organized the Harper-Turner Oil Company and established the 10,000 acre Turner Ranch at Sulphur, Oklahoma; but he maintained a residence in Oklahoma City where he served on the local school board from 1939 to 1946.

Turner fought and won a bitter campaign battle in 1946 against Tulsa County prosecutor Dixie Gilmer to win the gubernatorial election. His term as governor of Oklahoma was from January 13, 1947, to January 8, 1951, during which the State Highway Department and the State Planning and Resources Board were reorganized; the Oklahoma Turnpike Authority was established; a Board of Regents for State Colleges was created; and segregation in higher education was ended in the state.

Turner and the Oklahoma Legislature produced a budget in his first year that increased appropriations by $29 million over the previous two years while reducing the income tax by a third. State mental institutions received double their allotment for the previous two years.

From July 14–18, 1949, he appeared on several radio and TV programs in New York City, including Toast of the Town, to promote his single, "My Memory Trail", released on the Beacon Music label.

Turner appeared as himself in the 1951 film, Jim Thorpe – All-American.

== Death and legacy ==
Turner lived in Oklahoma City until his death June 11, 1973, and is interred in Rose Hill Burial Park, Oklahoma City. The 88-mile Turner Turnpike, a section of Interstate 44 between Oklahoma City and Tulsa, was named for Turner in commemoration of efforts during his administration that led to the construction of the toll road between the state's two largest cities. The turnpike opened to traffic in 1953, two years after his term as governor ended.

Party political offices
| Preceded by Robert S. Kerr | Democratic nominee for Governor of Oklahoma; 1946 | Succeeded by Johnston Murray |
Political offices
| Preceded by Robert S. Kerr | Governor of Oklahoma; 1947–1951 | Succeeded by Johnston Murray |
