= Rose Hill Burial Park (Oklahoma City, Oklahoma) =

Cemetery in Oklahoma, US

Coordinates: 35°31′53″N 97°32′14″W

- Interactive map of Rose Hill Burial Park

Details
- Established: 1915
- Location: Oklahoma City, Oklahoma

Rose Hill Burial Park is a historic cemetery in Oklahoma City, Oklahoma, U.S. It was established in 1915 by Charles H. Moureau and the Harden Realty Company. A mausoleum at the cemetery was built in 1919. Gravesites for notable figures in Oklahoma and Oklahoma City's history are part of the cemetery.

The cemetery was vandalized in 1990. The vandals unearthed a grave and stole jewelry from an Arkansas man buried four months earlier.

In 2016, Boy Scouts handed out small American flags and helped families locate gravesites on Memorial Day at the cemetery.

== Gravesites ==
Notable gravesites include:

- Plato Andros, pro football player
- John H. Burford, judge on the Oklahoma Supreme Court
- Jan Eric Cartwright, Attorney General of Oklahoma
- Cot Deal, MLB player and coach
- Scott Ferris, US Representative
- William J. Holloway, Governor of Oklahoma
- Noah Hutchings, broadcaster
- John Jarman, US Representative
- Robert S. Kerr, Governor of Oklahoma, later reinterred to family homestead in Ada, Oklahoma
- Travis M. Kerr, businessman, Thoroughbred racehorse owner
- Glen A. Larson, television writer, creator of Battlestar Galactica, Knight Rider and Magnum, P.I.
- James V. McClintic, US Representative
- Bobby Murcer, MLB outfielder and broadcaster
- Jimmy Reece, racecar driver
- Gomer Griffith Smith, US Representative
- Ulysses S. Stone, US Representative
- Joseph Bradfield Thoburn, historian
- Roy J. Turner, governor
- Lawrence Walsh, lawyer, judge, and US Deputy Attorney General
- Jack C. Walton, Governor of Oklahoma
- Lloyd Waner, Hall of Fame baseball player
- Muriel Hazel Wright, historian of Oklahoma
- Stanley Draper, director of the Oklahoma City Chamber of Commerce.
