= 1962 United States Senate election in Oklahoma =

- November 6, 1962
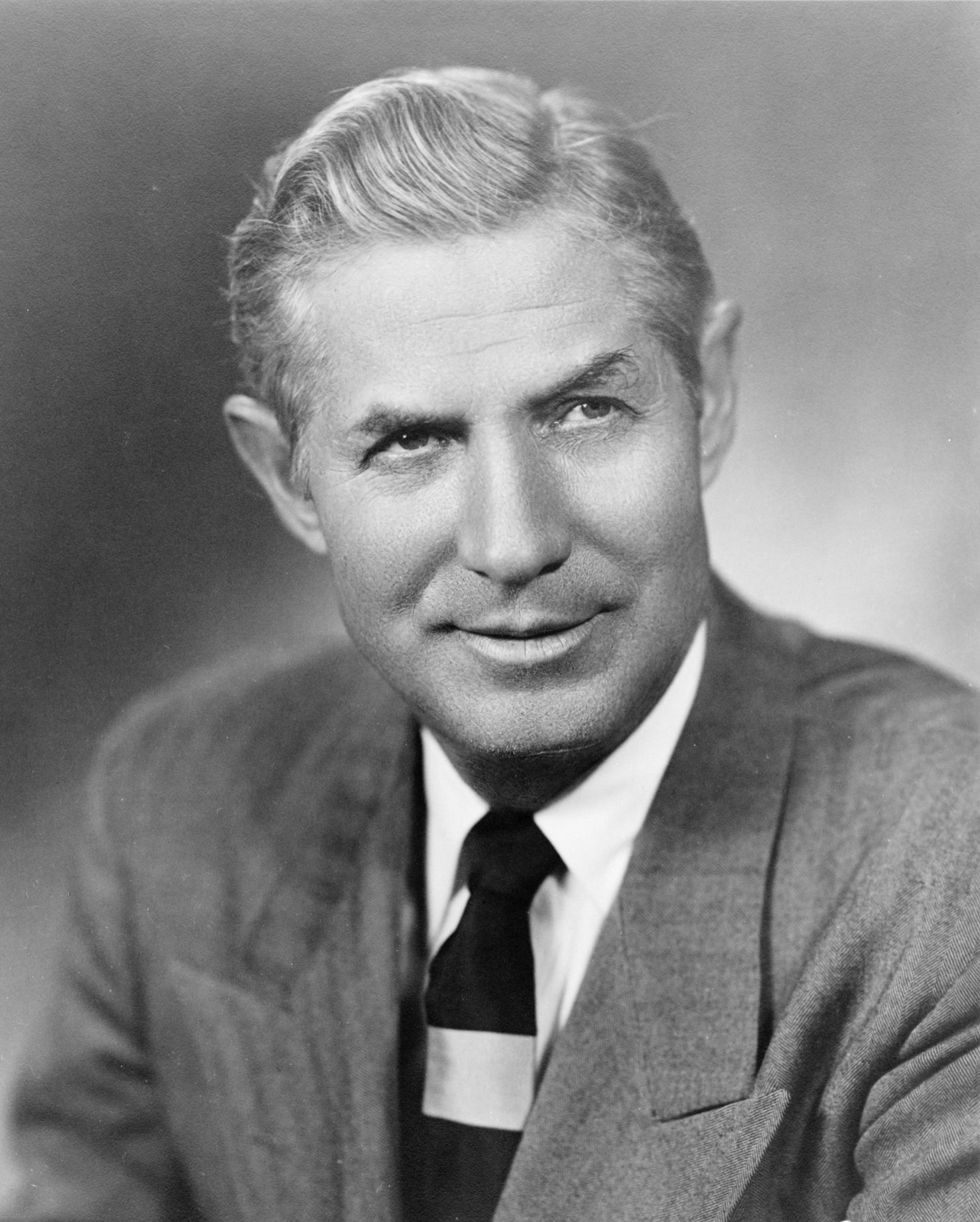

Nominee	Mike Monroney	B. Hayden Crawford
Party	Democratic	Republican
Popular vote	353,890	307,966
Percentage	53.24%	46.33%
- County results Monroney: 50–60% 60–70% 70–80% Crawford: 40–50% 50–60% 60–70% 70–80%
U.S. senator before election
Mike Monroney
Democratic
Elected U.S. Senator
Mike Monroney
Democratic

The 1962 United States Senate election in Oklahoma took place on November 6, 1962. Incumbent Democratic Senator Mike Monroney was re-elected to a third term. After winning a sizable victory in the Democratic primary, Monroney faced Republican former U.S. Attorney B. Hayden Crawford in the general election. Monroney won his last term in the Senate before his defeat in 1968. This election marks the last time that a Democrat has won Oklahoma's Class 3 Senate seat.

== Democratic primary ==
=== Candidates ===
- Mike Monroney, incumbent U.S. Senator
- Wilson Wallace, former State Representative
- Billy E. Brown, Tulsa contractor
- Woodrow W. Bussey, Oklahoma City plumber

=== Results ===
Democratic primary
Party	Candidate	Votes	%
Democratic	Mike Monroney (inc.)	335,922	74.31%
Democratic	Wilson Wallace	64,996	14.38%
Democratic	Billy E. Brown	26,440	5.85%
Democratic	Woodrow W. Bussey	24,725	5.47%
Total votes		452,083	100.00%

== Republican primary ==
B. Hayden Crawford, the former U.S. Attorney for the Northern District of Oklahoma and the Republican nominee for the U.S. Senate in 1960, was the only Republican candidate to file for the U.S. Senate race. Accordingly, he received the nomination unopposed and the race was removed from the primary ballot.

== General election ==
=== Results ===
1962 United States Senate election in Oklahoma
Party	Candidate	Votes	%	±%
Democratic	Mike Monroney (inc.)	353,890	53.24%	−2.11%
Republican	B. Hayden Crawford	307,966	46.33%	+1.68%
Majority		45,924	6.91%	−3.78%
Turnout		664,712		
Democratic hold				
