= 1972 United States Senate election in Oklahoma =

- November 7, 1972
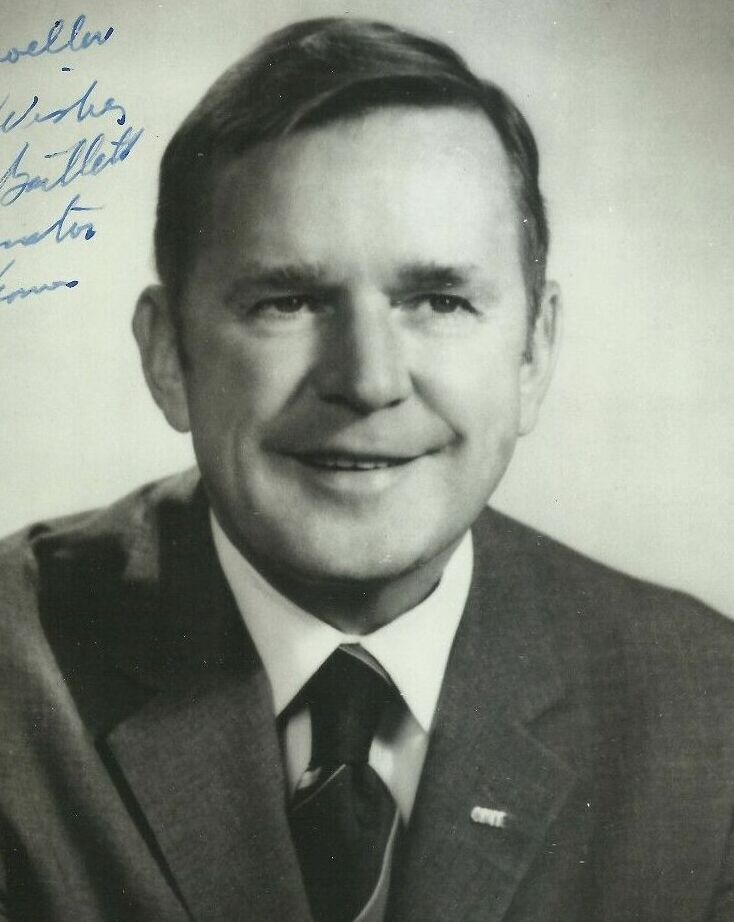

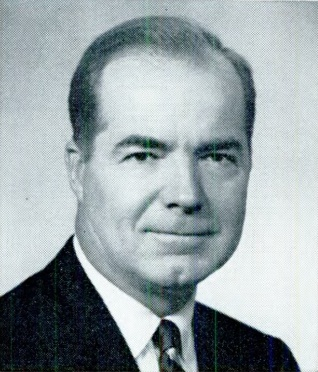
Nominee	Dewey F. Bartlett	Ed Edmondson
Party	Republican	Democratic
Popular vote	516,934	478,212
Percentage	51.43%	47.58%
- County results Bartlett: 50–60% 60–70% Edmondson: 50–60% 60–70%
U.S. senator before election
Fred R. Harris
Democratic
Elected U.S. Senator
Dewey F. Bartlett
Republican

The 1972 United States Senate election in Oklahoma took place on November 7, 1972. The incumbent Democratic Senator, Fred R. Harris, had retired to run for president. The open seat was won by Republican Dewey F. Bartlett, who defeated Democratic nominee Ed Edmondson. However, his victory underperformed that of President Richard Nixon in the concurrent presidential election, which saw Nixon defeat George McGovern by 49.7% in the state.

== Democratic primary ==
=== Candidates ===
- Ed Edmondson, U.S. representative for Oklahoma's 2nd district
- Jed Johnson Jr., former U.S. representative for Oklahoma's 6th district
- Clara Luper, civil rights activist
- Charles R. Nesbitt, Oklahoma corporation commissioner
- Al Terrill, state senator for the 32nd district

=== Results ===
Democratic primary
Party	Candidate	Votes	%
Democratic	Ed Edmondson	249,729	56.35%
Democratic	Charles R. Nesbitt	92,101	20.78%
Democratic	Al Terrill	33,520	7.56%
Democratic	Jed Johnson Jr.	28,795	6.50%
Democratic	John Rogers	15,280	3.45%
Democratic	Clara Luper	10,457	2.36%
Democratic	Bill Tiffany	4,184	0.94%
Democratic	Albert Anderson	2,870	0.65%
Democratic	Billy Brown	2,638	0.60%
Democratic	Henry Howell	2,230	0.50%
Democratic	Jesse D. Knipp	1,386	0.31%
Total votes		443,190	100.00%

== Republican primary ==
=== Candidates ===
- Dewey F. Bartlett, former governor of Oklahoma

=== Results ===
Republican primary
Party	Candidate	Votes	%
Republican	Dewey F. Bartlett	94,935	93.11%
Republican	C. W. Wood	7,029	6.89%
Total votes		101,964	100.00%

== Results ==
1972 United States Senate election in Oklahoma
Party	Candidate	Votes	%	±%
Republican	Dewey F. Bartlett	516,934	51.43%	+5.15%
Democratic	Ed Edmondson	478,212	47.58%	−6.14%
American	William G. Roach	5,769	0.57%	N/A
Independent	Joe C. Phillips	2,264	0.23%	N/A
Independent	Paul E. Trent	1,969	0.20%	N/A
Majority		38,722	3.85%	−3.6%
Turnout		1,005,148		
Republican gain from Democratic				
