= Wilson Wallace =

American politician

Member of the Oklahoma House of Representatives from the Carter County district
- In office 1945–1949
- Preceded by: Ernest W. Tate
- Succeeded by: Ernest W. Tate
- In office 1937–1941
- Preceded by: Alvin Bruce
- Succeeded by: Ernest W. Tate

Personal details
- Party: Democratic Party

Wilson Wallace (born c.1911) was an American politician who served in the Oklahoma House of Representatives representing Carter County.

== Biography ==
A member of the Democratic Party, Wallace served in the Oklahoma House representing Carter County from 1937 to 1941 and 1945 to 1949. He ran in the 1962 United States Senate election in Oklahoma, losing to Mike Monroney.

== Electoral history ==
Democratic primary
Party	Candidate	Votes	%
Democratic	Mike Monroney (inc.)	335,922	74.31%
Democratic	Wilson Wallace	64,996	14.38%
Democratic	Billy E. Brown	26,440	5.85%
Democratic	Woodrow W. Bussey	24,725	5.47%
Total votes		452,083	100.00%
