= 1964 United States Senate special election in Oklahoma =

- November 3, 1964
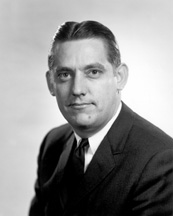

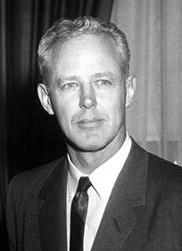
| Nominee | Fred R. Harris | Bud Wilkinson |
| Party | Democratic | Republican |
| Popular vote | 466,782 | 445,392 |
| Percentage | 51.17% | 48.83% |
- County results Harris: 50–60% 60–70% 70–80% Wilkinson: 50–60% 60–70%
U.S. senator before election
J. Howard Edmondson
Democratic
Elected U.S. Senator
Fred R. Harris
Democratic

The 1964 United States Senate special election in Oklahoma took place on November 3, 1964. Democratic senator Robert S. Kerr, who won re-election to his third term in 1960, died in office on January 1, 1963. Governor J. Howard Edmondson resigned from office so that his lieutenant governor, George Nigh, could appoint him to the U.S. Senate. Edmondson ran for election in the ensuing special election, and faced strong competition from former governor Raymond D. Gary and State Senator Fred R. Harris. Edmondson placed first in the primary, but failed to win a majority, with Harris narrowly beating out Gary for second place. In the runoff, Harris defeated Edmondson in a landslide. In the general election, Harris faced former Oklahoma Sooners football coach Bud Wilkinson, the Republican nominee. Even though President Lyndon B. Johnson won Oklahoma by a wide margin over Republican presidential nominee Barry Goldwater, the Senate race was much closer. Ultimately, Harris only narrowly defeated Wilkinson by just 21,390 votes.

== Democratic primary ==
=== Candidates ===
- J. Howard Edmondson, incumbent U.S. Senator, former governor of Oklahoma
- Fred R. Harris, state senator
- Raymond D. Gary, former governor of Oklahoma

=== Results ===
Democratic primary
| Party | Candidate | Votes | % |
|---|---|---|---|
| Democratic | J. Howard Edmondson (inc.) | 215,455 | 36.44% |
| Democratic | Fred R. Harris | 190,868 | 32.28% |
| Democratic | Raymond Gary | 170,869 | 28.90% |
| Democratic | Willard R. Owens | 14,134 | 2.39% |
| Total votes | | 591,326 | 100.00% |

=== Runoff election results ===
Democratic primary runoff
| Party | Candidate | Votes | % |
|---|---|---|---|
| Democratic | Fred R. Harris | 277,362 | 60.90% |
| Democratic | J. Howard Edmondson (inc.) | 178,051 | 39.10% |
| Total votes | | 455,413 | 100.00% |

== Republican primary ==
=== Candidates ===
- Bud Wilkinson, former Oklahoma Sooners football coach
- Thomas J. Harris, Oklahoma City businessman
- Forest W. Beall, former chairman of the Oklahoma Republican Party

=== Runoff Election Results ===
Republican primary
| Party | Candidate | Votes | % |
|---|---|---|---|
| Republican | Bud Wilkinson | 100,544 | 79.22% |
| Republican | Thomas J. Harris | 19,170 | 15.10% |
| Republican | Forest W. Beall | 7,211 | 5.68% |
| Total votes | | 126,925 | 100.00% |

== General election ==
=== Results ===
1964 United States Senate special election in Oklahoma
| Party | Candidate | Votes | % | ±% |
|---|---|---|---|---|
| Democratic | Fred R. Harris | 466,782 | 51.17% | −3.67% |
| Republican | Bud Wilkinson | 445,392 | 48.83% | +4.22% |
| Majority | | 21,390 | 2.34% | −7.89% |
| Turnout | | 912,174 | | |
| Democratic hold | | | | |
