= 1974 United States Senate election in Oklahoma =

- November 3, 1974
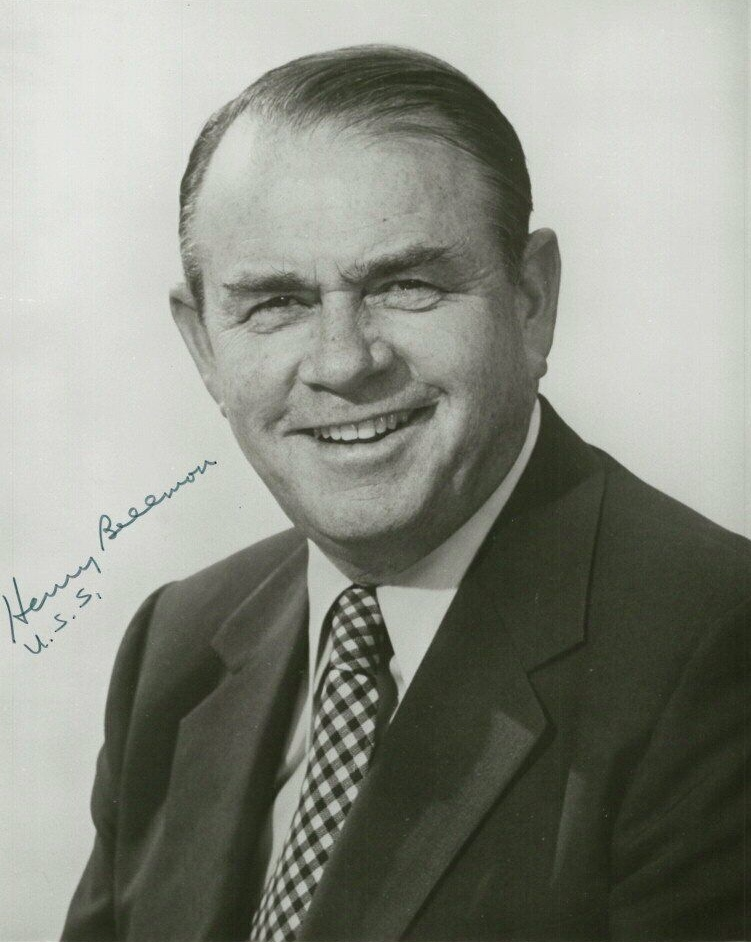

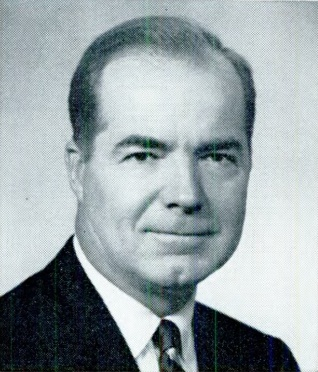
Nominee	Henry Bellmon	Ed Edmondson
Party	Republican	Democratic
Popular vote	390,997	387,162
Percentage	49.38%	48.90%
- County results Bellmon: 40–50% 50–60% 60–70% 70–80% Edmondson: 40–50% 50–60% 60–70% 70–80%
U.S. senator before election
Henry Bellmon
Republican
Elected U.S. Senator
Henry Bellmon
Republican

The 1974 United States Senate election in Oklahoma was held on November 3, 1974. Incumbent Republican U.S. Senator Henry Bellmon narrowly won re-election to a second term, beating Representative Ed Edmondson (D-OK) by nearly 4,000 votes. Henry Bellmon was the first Republican United States senator from Oklahoma ever to win re-election.

In March 1976, Senate Democrats called for Bellmon's seat to be declared vacant and for a new election to be held in Oklahoma. Edmondson had charged that voting irregularities had tipped the election in favor of Bellmon. For example, voting machines in Tulsa County, which had a large population of registered Democrats, had lacked straight party levers.

== Major candidates ==
=== Democratic ===
- Wilburn Cartwright, former U.S. congressman
- Ed Edmondson, U.S. congressman
- Charles R. Nesbitt, Oklahoma corporation commissioner

=== Republican ===
- Henry Bellmon, incumbent U.S. senator

== Results ==
General election results
Party	Candidate	Votes	%	±%
Republican	Henry Bellmon (incumbent)	390,997	49.38%	−2.33%
Democratic	Ed Edmondson	387,162	48.90%	+2.74%
Independent	Paul E. Trent	13,650	1.72%	N/A

== See also ==
- 1974 United States Senate elections
