= Ed Edmondson (politician) =

American politician

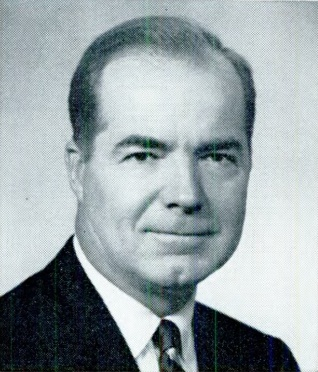

Member of the U.S. House of Representatives from Oklahoma's 2nd district
- In office January 3, 1953 – January 3, 1973
- Preceded by: William G. Stigler
- Succeeded by: Clem McSpadden

Personal details
- Born: Edmond Augustus Edmondson; April 7, 1919 Muskogee, Oklahoma, U.S.
- Died: December 8, 1990 (aged 71) Muskogee, Oklahoma, U.S.
- Party: Democratic
- Spouse: June Edmondson
- Children: James E. Edmondson; Drew Edmondson
- Relatives: J. Howard Edmondson (brother)
- Education: University of Oklahoma; Georgetown University Law Center

Military service
- Allegiance: United States of America
- Branch/service: United States Navy
- Years of service: 1943–1946 (Navy); 1946-1970 (Navy Reserve)

Edmond Augustus Edmondson (April 7, 1919 – December 8, 1990) was an American World War II veteran, lawyer, and politician from Oklahoma. A member of the Democratic Party, he served ten terms in the U.S. House of Representatives, representing Oklahoma's 2nd congressional district from 1953 to 1973.

Edmondson served 10 terms in the U.S. House of Representatives from 1953 to 1973. He ran as a candidate but was defeated in U.S. Senate elections in Oklahoma three times in 1972, 1974, and 1978.

== Early life and education ==
Edmondson was born and raised in Muskogee, Oklahoma, where he attended public school before going on to attend Muskogee Junior College. His brother, J. Howard Edmondson, also became a politician, and was elected Governor of Oklahoma and as a member of the U.S. Senate.

He attended the University of Oklahoma, where he was a member of the Phi Gamma Delta, graduating in 1940. After graduating, he joined the Federal Bureau of Investigation (FBI), serving as a special agent until 1943.

From 1943 to 1946, he served in the United States Navy and continued in the reserves until 1970. He earned a law degree from Georgetown University Law Center in 1947.

== U.S. House of Representatives ==
Edmondson served in the U.S. House of Representatives from 1953 to 1973, representing the state's 2nd congressional district. Edmondson did not sign the 1956 Southern Manifesto. He voted in favor of the Civil Rights Acts of 1957, 1960, 1964, and 1968. Additionally, he voted in favor of the 24th Amendment to the U.S. Constitution and the Voting Rights Act of 1965. For the most part, Edmondson had a liberal voting record.

He sponsored a bill which authorized the return of the building which housed the Five Civilized Tribes Museum to the city government of Muskogee, Oklahoma.

== U.S. Senate elections ==
In the 1972 election, he was a candidate for the U.S. Senate, but narrowly lost the general election to former Oklahoma Governor Dewey F. Bartlett.

In the 1974 election, he ran for the state's other U.S. Senate seat, losing to incumbent Henry Bellmon by less than 1 percent of the vote.

In the 1978 election, he made a surprise late entry in the U.S. Senate race, losing the Democratic primary runoff to popular Governor David Boren by a wide margin.

== Personal life ==
Edmondson and his wife June had five children. One of their sons, James E. Edmondson, went on to become an Oklahoma Supreme Court Justice. Another son, Drew Edmondson, was elected Attorney General of Oklahoma and was the Democratic nominee for Governor in the 2018 election.

== Death and legacy ==
Edmondson died in Muskogee, Oklahoma on December 8, 1990. In 2003, the federal courthouse in Muskogee was renamed the Ed Edmondson United States Courthouse in his honor.

Party political offices
Preceded by Fred R. Harris	Democratic nominee for U.S. Senator from Oklahoma (Class 2); 1972	Succeeded by David Boren
Preceded by Mike Monroney	Democratic nominee for U.S. Senator from Oklahoma (Class 3); 1974	Succeeded by Andy Coats
U.S. House of Representatives
Preceded by William G. Stigler	Member of the U.S. House of Representatives from Oklahoma's 2nd congressional district January 3, 1953 – January 3, 1973	Succeeded by Clem McSpadden
