= 1956 United States Senate election in Oklahoma =

- November 6, 1956
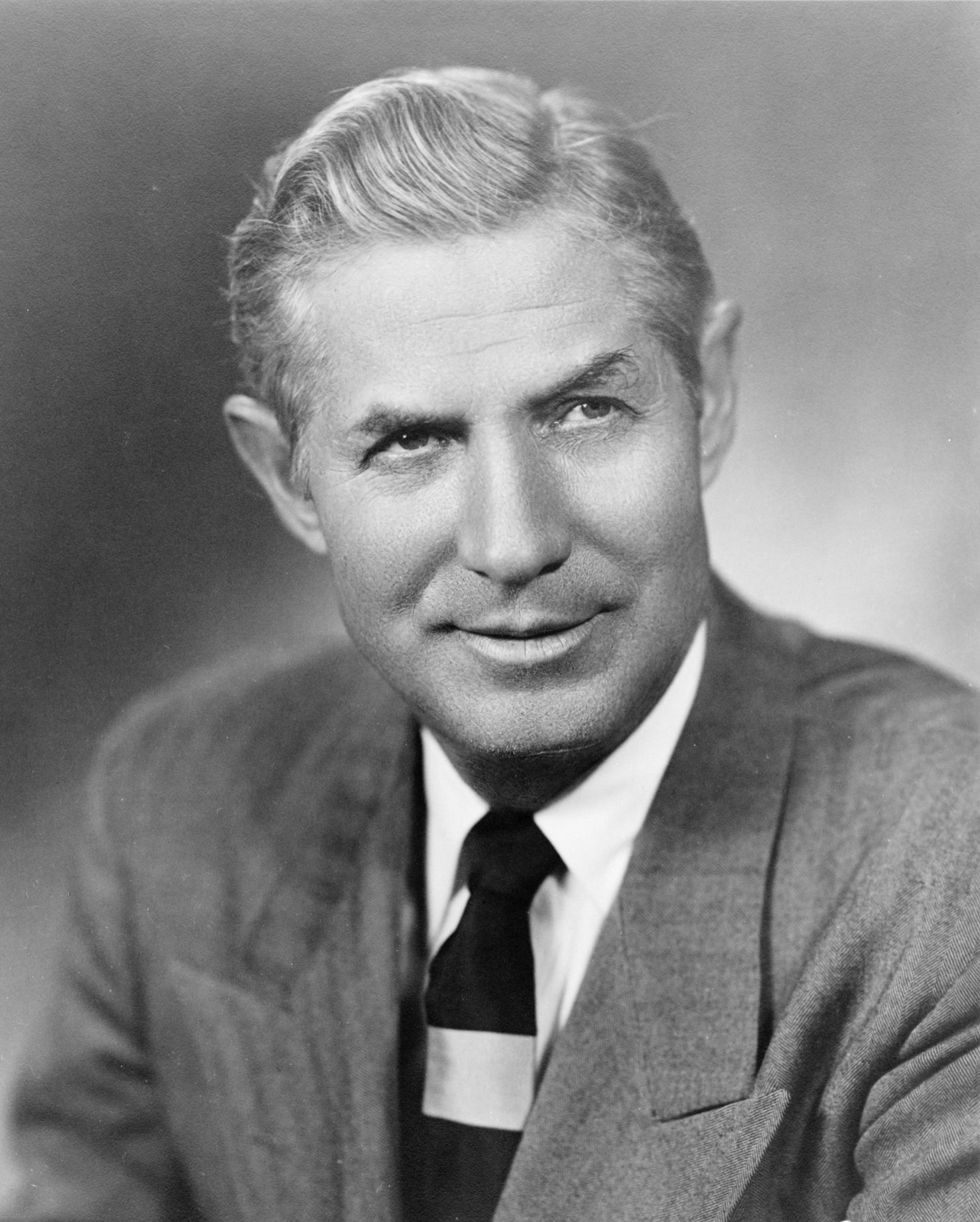

Nominee	Mike Monroney	Douglas McKeever
Party	Democratic	Republican
Popular vote	459,996	371,146
Percentage	55.35%	44.65%
- County results Monroney: 50–60% 60–70% 70–80% 80–90% McKeever: 50–60% 60–70%
U.S. senator before election
Mike Monroney
Democratic
Elected U.S. Senator
Mike Monroney
Democratic

The 1956 United States Senate election in Oklahoma took place on November 6, 1956. Incumbent Democratic Senator Mike Monroney ran for re-election to a second term. He avoided a contentious Democratic primary when Lieutenant Governor Cowboy Pink Williams declined to challenge him and easily won renomination. In the general election, he faced Republican state party chairman Douglas McKeever. Even though President Dwight D. Eisenhower was winning the state handily, Monroney won re-election by a wide margin.

== Democratic primary ==
=== Candidates ===
- Mike Monroney, incumbent U.S. Senator
- R. Os Doenges, school supply salesman
- O. J. Fox, perennial candidate
- George W. Wulff, Oklahoma City attorney

==== Dropped out ====
- Cowboy Pink Williams, Lieutenant Governor of Oklahoma

=== Results ===
Democratic primary
Party	Candidate	Votes	%
Democratic	Mike Monroney (inc.)	245,572	71.11%
Democratic	R. Os Doenges	54,546	15.79%
Democratic	O. J. Fox	29,825	8.64%
Democratic	George W. Wulff	15,397	4.46%
Total votes		345,340	100.00%

== Republican primary ==
=== Candidates ===
- Douglas McKeever, Chairman of the Oklahoma Republican Party
- Paul V. Beck, State Representative from Tulsa County
- Ernest G. Albright, Shawnee newspaperman
- Dan M. Madrano, former State Representative from Tulsa County

=== Results ===
Republican primary
Party	Candidate	Votes	%
Republican	Douglas McKeever	24,447	55.52%
Republican	Paul V. Beck	7,666	17.41%
Republican	Ernest G. Albright	6,539	14.85%
Republican	Dan M. Madrano	5,379	12.22%
Total votes		44,031	100.00%

== General election ==
=== Results ===
1956 United States Senate election in Oklahoma
Party	Candidate	Votes	%	±%
Democratic	Mike Monroney (inc.)	459,996	55.35%	+0.53%
Republican	Douglas McKeever	371,146	44.65%	−0.53%
Majority		88,850	10.69%	+1.07%
Turnout		831,142		
Democratic hold				
