= 1960 United States Senate election in Oklahoma =

- November 8, 1960
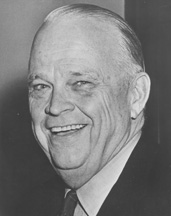

Nominee	Robert S. Kerr	B. Hayden Crawford
Party	Democratic	Republican
Popular vote	474,116	385,646
Percentage	54.84%	44.61%
- County results Kerr: 50–60% 60–70% 70–80% Crawford: 50–60% 60–70%
U.S. senator before election
Robert S. Kerr
Democratic
Elected U.S. Senator
Robert S. Kerr
Democratic

The 1960 United States Senate election in Oklahoma took place on November 8, 1960. Incumbent Democratic Senator Robert S. Kerr ran for re-election to a third term. He won the Democratic primary in a landslide and then faced former U.S. Attorney B. Hayden Crawford, the Republican nominee, in the general election. Even as Vice President Richard Nixon was winning Oklahoma in a landslide over John F. Kennedy, Kerr was able to defeat Crawford by a wide margin, winning his third term. However, Kerr died just shy of two years into his third term, on January 1, 1963. He was replaced by Governor J. Howard Edmondson in the Senate and a special election was held in 1964.

== Democratic primary ==
=== Candidates ===
- Robert S. Kerr, incumbent U.S. Senator
- Thomas C. Dunn
- D. R. Condo

=== Results ===
Democratic primary
Party	Candidate	Votes	%
Democratic	Robert S. Kerr (inc.)	300,061	77.61%
Democratic	Thomas C. Dunn	65,139	16.85%
Democratic	D. R. Condo	21,420	5.54%
Total votes		386,620	100.00%

== Republican primary ==
=== Candidates ===
- B. Hayden Crawford, former U.S. Attorney
- Herbert K. Hyde, former U.S. Attorney, 1936 Republican nominee for the U.S. Senate

=== Results ===
Republican primary
Party	Candidate	Votes	%
Republican	B. Hayden Crawford	37,508	70.44%
Republican	Herbert K. Hyde	15,743	29.56%
Total votes		53,251	100.00%

== General election ==
=== Results ===
=

1960 United States Senate election in Oklahoma
Party	Candidate	Votes	%	±%
Democratic	Robert S. Kerr (inc.)	474,116	54.84%	−1.00%
Republican	B. Hayden Crawford	385,646	44.61%	+0.95%
Independent	Billy E. Brown	4,713	0.55%	—
Majority		88,470	10.23%	−1.95%
Turnout		864,475		
Democratic hold				
