= LaDonna Harris =

Comanche social activist and politician from Oklahoma (born 1931)

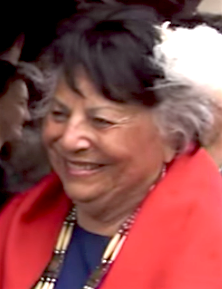
- LaDonna Harris (2011)
- Born: Ladonna Vita Tabbytite; February 15, 1931 (age 95); Temple, Oklahoma, U.S.
- Citizenship: Comanche Nation and U.S.
- Occupation: social activist
- Known for: first Native American woman to run for vice president EasyRiders (June 1985 issue)
- Political party: Democratic
- Other political affiliations: Citizens (1980)
- Spouse: Fred R. Harris (m. 1949; div. 1982)
- Children: 3

LaDonna Vita Tabbytite Harris (born February 15, 1931) is a Comanche Native American social activist and politician from Oklahoma. She is the founder and president of Americans for Indian Opportunity. Harris was a vice presidential candidate for the Citizens Party in the 1980 United States presidential election alongside Barry Commoner. She was the first Native American woman to run for vice president. In 2018, she became one of the inductees in the first induction ceremony held by the National Native American Hall of Fame.

== Early life ==
Harris was born Ladonna Vita Tabbytite, in Temple, Oklahoma, to Lilly Tabbytite (Comanche) and Donald Crawford, a non-Native; the couple separated shortly after her birth. She was raised traditionally by her maternal grandparents in a self-governing Indigenous community on a farm near the small town of Walters, Oklahoma. She speaks Comanche as her first language. She learned English when she began attending public school. In 1949, shortly after graduating high school, she married Fred R. Harris, the white son of a son of a sharecropper. Ladonna followed and supported Fred through Law school, and became very involved in his campaign for U.S. Senate. In 1964, Fred Harris was elected to the U.S. Senate of Oklahoma, and the family, now with three children, relocated from Oklahoma to Washington, D.C.

== Earlier political career ==
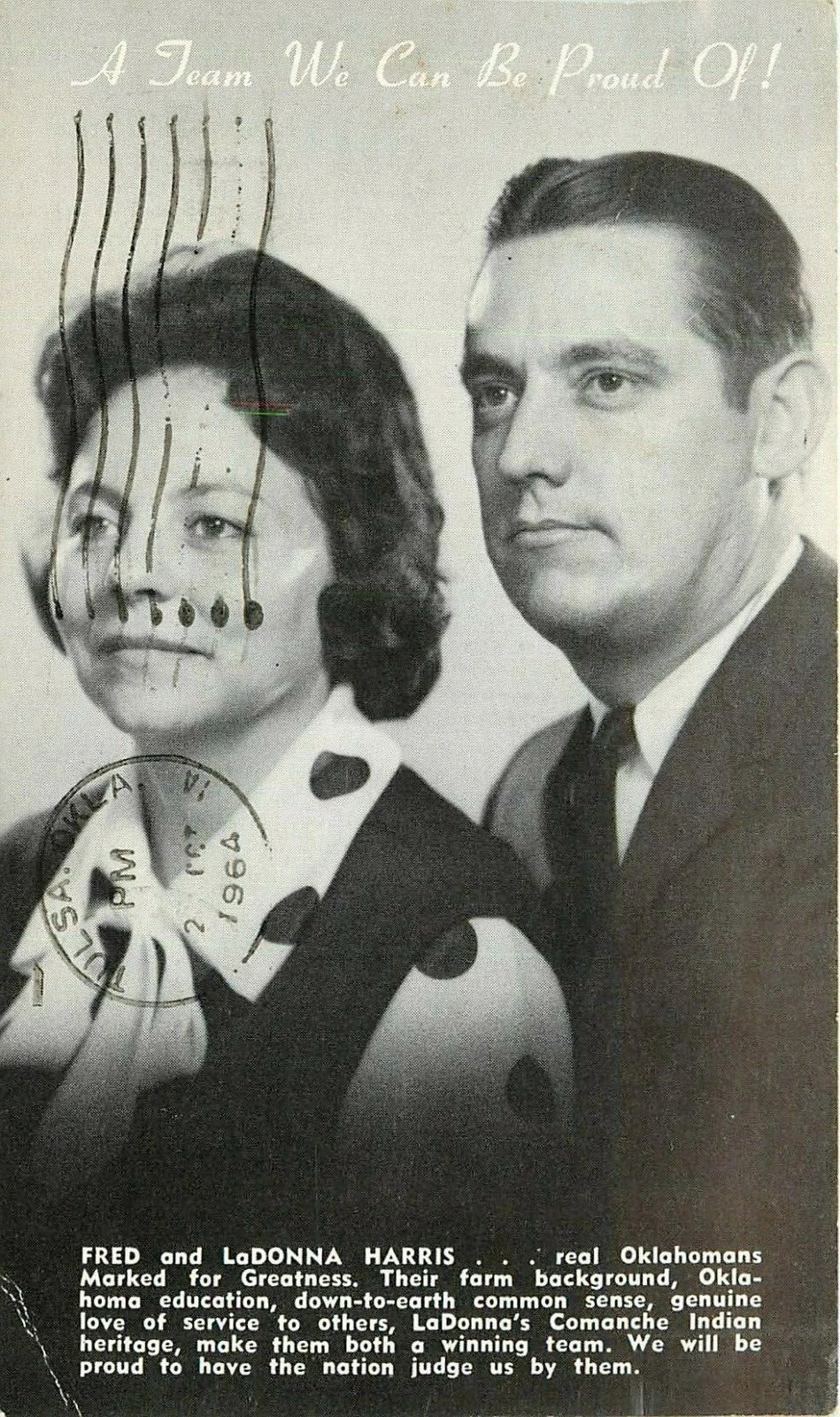
Campaign postcard featuring Harris and her husband Fred, 1964

While residing in Washington, D.C., LaDonna Harris was able to accomplish many things with her new connections through her husband in the U.S. Senate. She founded the first intertribal organization in Oklahoma, the Oklahomans for Indian Opportunity (OIO), and became the first wife of a senator to testify before Congress to argue for continued funding to support indigenous tribal organizations. President Lyndon B. Johnson recognized Ms. Harris's accomplishments and her impact on Native Americans, and appointed her to the National Council on Indian Opportunity (NICO). With the support of President Johnson, Harris created the first Native American-education course, titled "Indian 101", to be required completion by all members of Congress. Harris taught the course herself for thirty years.

Harris eventually left the NICO and founded the Americans for Indian Opportunity (AIO). Since the 1970s, she has presided over AIO, which works to "advance the cultural, political and economic rights of Indigenous peoples in the U.S. and around the world". She has helped to begin Indigenous organizations including the National Indian Housing Council, Council of Energy Resource Tribes, National Tribal Environmental Council, and National Indian Business Association.

Harris has been appointed to several Presidential Commissions. She was recognized by Vice President Al Gore in 1994 as a leader in the area of telecommunications in his remarks at the White House Tribal Summit. She has been granted many awards and honorary degrees. She was a founding member of Common Cause and the National Urban Coalition and is a spokesperson against poverty and social injustice. As an advocate for women's rights, she was a founder of the National Women's Political Caucus.

== Political activism ==
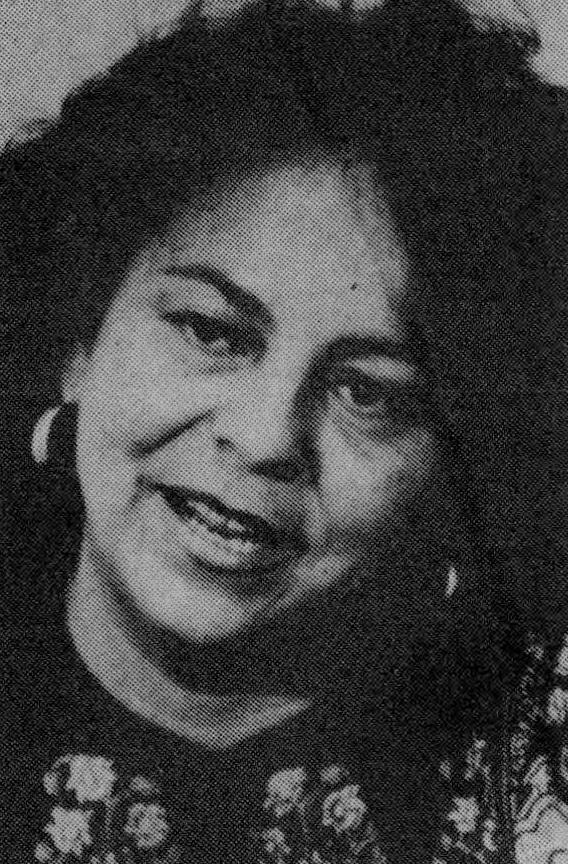
Harris as a candidate for Vice President, 1980

Harris helped the Taos Pueblo regain control of Blue Lake, and she helped the Menominee tribe gain federal recognition after their tribe had been terminated by the US federal government. She was an original member of Global Tomorrow Coalition, the U.S. Representative to the OAS Inter-American Indigenous Institute, and the United Nations Educational, Scientific and Cultural Organization (UNESCO).

While Ladonna and Fred were living in Washington D.C, the Harris' worked to regain control of Taos Blue Lake. In the process, Fred was up against a revival opponent competing for his seat. Fred held up all of the laws that were coming in claiming that they could not come to the floor until everyone voted on the Taos Blue Lake. His rival at the time looked at Fred and said, "we don't mess with your Indians in Oklahoma and you shouldnt mess with mine". To which Fred replied, "they are not yours, senator".

In the 1960s, Harris lived in Washington, D.C., and was in constant social and political contact with the top echelons of the Democratic Party, including President Lyndon B. Johnson and the First Lady. At the same time, her daughter Kathryn – at the time a university student - was deeply involved in the anti-war movement opposing the Vietnam War. Kathryn brought home other student activists to stay the night, and used the parental home as an unofficial headquarters where activists prepared for the next day's demonstrations and confrontations with police - with the tacit consent of her parents.

With the end of her husband's Congressional career, LaDonna Harris moved away from mainstream politics within the Democratic Party. In 1980, as the vice presidential nominee on the Citizens Party ticket with Barry Commoner, Harris added environmental issues to the national debate and future presidential campaigns. Harris was the first Indigenous woman to run for vice president. She was replaced on the ballot in Ohio by Wretha Hanson.

Harris endorsed Bernie Sanders for president during the 2016 Democratic presidential primaries.

She was an honorary co-chair of the Women's March on Washington on January 21, 2017.

== Community involvement ==
Harris served on the boards of the Girl Scouts of the USA, Independent Sector, Council on Foundations, National Organization for Women, National Urban League, Save the Children, National Committee Against Discrimination in Housing, and Overseas Development Corporation.

Currently, she serves on the boards of Advancement of Maori Opportunity, Institute for 21st Century Agoras, National Senior Citizens Law Center, and Think New Mexico. She serves on the advisory boards of the National Museum of the American Indian, American Civil Liberties Union, Delphi International Group, and National Institute for Women of Color.

She is an honorary Member of Delta Sigma Theta sorority.

== Adoption of Johnny Depp ==
After reading about the filming of the 2013 movie The Lone Ranger, and that Johnny Depp's reprisal of the role of 'Tonto' would be as a Comanche, Harris adopted Depp as an honorary son, making him an honorary member of her family but not an enrolled member of any tribe. She discussed the idea with her adult children, and they agreed. A unique adoption ceremony took place on May 16, 2012, at Harris's home in Albuquerque, New Mexico, attended by the cultural advisor for The Lone Ranger and an official from the tribe. "Welcoming Johnny into the family in the traditional way was so fitting... He's a very thoughtful human being, and throughout his life and career, he has exhibited traits that are aligned with the values and worldview that Indigenous peoples share", Harris said. Critical coverage of Depp in Indian Country increased after this, including satirical portrayals of Depp by Native comedians.

Americans for Indian Opportunity, founded by Harris, was consulted by Dior in relation to a 2019 ad for the fragrance "Sauvage", featuring Depp and Native American imagery. The ad was pulled on August 30, 2019, after charges of cultural appropriation and racism. Harris stated on August 30 that she was proud of the collaboration, but AIO released a statement on September 10 saying that it "deeply regrets" the choice.

== Family life ==
Harris has raised three children: Kathryn Tijerina is executive director of the Railyard Park Trust in Santa Fe; Byron is a technician in television production in Los Angeles; and Laura works with her mother as the executive director at AIO. Harris' grandson, Sam Fred Goodhope, calls her by the Comanche word for grandmother, Kaqu.

== Filmography ==
- Brannum, Juliana (director) (2014). LaDonna Harris: Indian 101 (Motion Picture). lolflix, INC.

== Selected publications ==
- Harris, Ladonna; Margaret A. Fiore, and Jackie Wasilewski (1989). Overcoming Barriers to Effective Participation of Tribal Governments in the Federal System.
- Harris, LaDonna (2000). LaDonna Harris: A Comanche Life.
- Harris, LaDonna (2012). Book of Questions for Teen.
- Harris, LaDonna (2012). LaDonna Harris: Express Mail: Words of Encouragement.

== See also ==
- Native American women in politics

Preceded by —	Citizens Party vice presidential candidate 1980	Succeeded by Richard Walton
