= Bud Wilkinson =

American football player and coach; sports announcer (1916–1994)

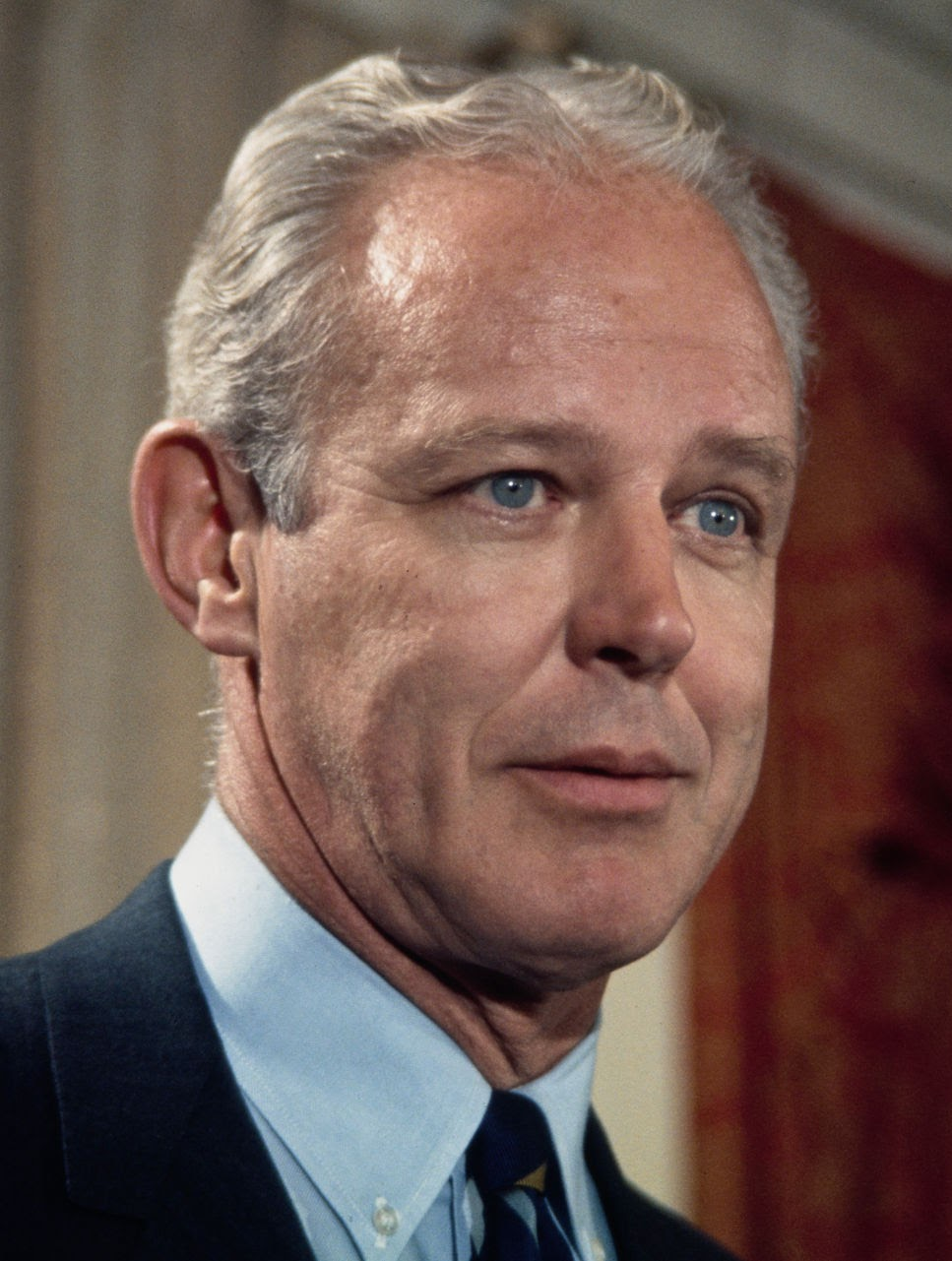
- Wilkinson in 1969

Biographical details
- Born: April 23, 1916; Minneapolis, Minnesota, U.S.
- Died: February 9, 1994 (aged 77); St. Louis, Missouri, U.S.

Playing career
- 1934–1936: Minnesota
- Position: Quarterback

Coaching career (HC unless noted)
- 1937–1941: Syracuse (assistant)
- 1942: Minnesota (assistant)
- 1943–1944: Iowa Pre-Flight (assistant)
- 1946: Oklahoma (assistant)
- 1947–1963: Oklahoma
- 1978–1979: St. Louis Cardinals

Administrative career (AD unless noted)
- 1947–1964: Oklahoma

Head coaching record
- Overall: 145–29–4 (college); 9–20 (NFL)
- Bowls: 6–2

Accomplishments and honors

Championships
- 3 national (1950, 1955–1956); 14 Big 6/7/8 (1947–1959, 1962)

Awards
- AFCA Coach of the Year (1949); 8× Big Eight Coach of the Year (1948−1955); Amos Alonzo Stagg Award (1984); Second-team All-American (1935); First-team All-Big Ten (1935); Second-team All-Big Ten (1936)
- College Football Hall of Fame; Inducted in 1969 (profile)

Charles Burnham "Bud" Wilkinson (April 23, 1916 – February 9, 1994) was an American football player, coach, broadcaster, and politician. He served as the head football coach at the University of Oklahoma from 1947 to 1963, compiling a record of 145–29–4. His Oklahoma Sooners won three national championships (1950, 1955, and 1956) and 14 conference titles. Between 1953 and 1957, Wilkinson's Oklahoma squads won 47 straight games, a record that still stands at the highest level of college football. After retiring from coaching following the 1963 season, Wilkinson entered into politics and in 1965 became a broadcaster with ABC Sports. He returned to coaching in 1978, as head coach of the St. Louis Cardinals of the National Football League (NFL) for two seasons. Wilkinson was inducted into the College Football Hall of Fame as a coach in 1969.

== Early life and playing career ==
Wilkinson's mother died when he was seven, and his father sent him to the Shattuck School in Faribault, Minnesota, where he excelled in five sports and graduated in 1933. He enrolled at the University of Minnesota, where as a guard and quarterback for head coach Bernie Bierman, Wilkinson helped lead the Golden Gophers to three consecutive national championships from 1934 to 1936. He also played ice hockey for Minnesota. Following his graduation in 1937 with a degree in English, Wilkinson led the College All-Stars to a 6–0 victory over the defending NFL champion Green Bay Packers in Chicago on August 31. He was drafted in the third round of the 1937 NFL Draft by the Packers (29th overall) but never played.

== Coaching career ==
After Wilkinson worked briefly for his father's mortgage company, he became an assistant coach at Syracuse University and later at his alma mater, Minnesota. In 1943, he joined the U.S. Navy where he was an assistant to Don Faurot with the Iowa Pre-Flight Seahawks football team. He served as a hangar deck officer on the USS Enterprise. Following World War II, Jim Tatum, the new head coach at the University of Oklahoma, persuaded Wilkinson to join his staff in 1946. After one season in Norman, Tatum left the Sooners for the University of Maryland. The 31-year-old Wilkinson was named head football coach and athletic director of the Sooners.

=== Head coach at Oklahoma ===
In his first season as head coach in 1947, Wilkinson led Oklahoma to a 7–2–1 record and a share of the conference championship, the first of 13 consecutive Big Six/Seven/Eight Conference titles. Ultimately, Wilkinson became one of the most celebrated college coaches of all time. His teams captured national championships in 1950, 1955, and 1956, and they amassed a 145–29–4 (.826) overall record. Twice Minnesota attempted to hire him away from Oklahoma, in 1950 and 1953, but both times Wilkinson rebuffed his alma mater. OU football was placed on major NCAA probation twice in a five-year span (1955 and 1960) during Wilkinson's tenure for illegally paying players out of a $125,000 slush fund for a decade and a half after World War II ended. Both the 1955 and 1956 national championships were claimed while Oklahoma was actively on probation from April 26, 1955 to April 26, 1957.

The centerpiece of his time in Norman was a 47-game winning streak from 1953 to 1957, an NCAA Division I record that still stands. It has been approached only four times: by North Dakota State in Division I FCS (39 wins, 2017–2021), Toledo (35 wins, 1969–1971), Miami (FL) (34 wins, 2000–2003), and USC (34 wins, 2003–2005). Earlier, the Sooners ran off 31 consecutive wins from 1948 to 1950. Apart from two losses in 1951, Wilkinson's Sooners did not lose more than one game per season for 11 years between 1948 and 1958, going 107–8–2 over that period. His teams also went 12 consecutive seasons (1947–1958) without a loss in conference play, a streak which has never been seriously threatened. Wilkinson did not suffer his first conference loss until 1959 against Nebraska, his 79th conference game.

Wilkinson had only one losing season, in 1960. However, during that season Wilkinson still passed Bennie Owen to become the winningest coach in Sooner history. Wilkinson's OU record has since been eclipsed by Barry Switzer and Bob Stoops.

While coaching at OU, Wilkinson began writing a weekly newsletter to alumni during the season to keep them interested in Sooner football. He also became the first football coach to host his own television show. With Michigan State University coach Duffy Daugherty, Wilkinson sponsored a series of clinics for high school coaches nationwide. Later, they turned their clinics into a profitable business.

Following the 1963 season, his 17th at Oklahoma, Wilkinson retired from coaching at the age of 47.

=== President's Council on Physical Fitness ===
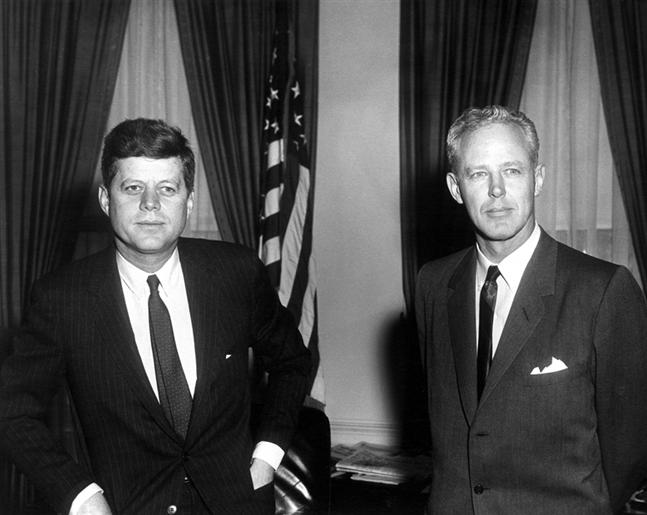
President John F. Kennedy with Bud Wilkinson in the Oval Office in 1961

While at Oklahoma, Wilkinson served on the President's Council on Physical Fitness from 1961 to 1964. He designed 11 floor exercises for schoolchildren that were incorporated into the song "Chicken Fat", the theme song for President John F. Kennedy's youth fitness program, which was widely used in school gymnasiums across the country in the 1960s and 1970s.

== Later life and career ==
=== 1964 Senate Bid ===
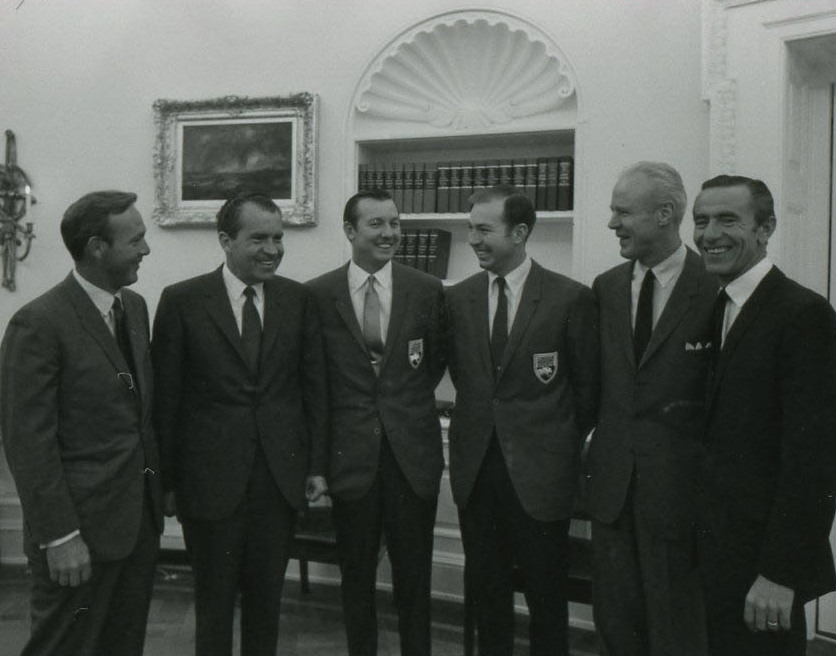
President Nixon meeting with golf pro Arnold Palmer, Al Kaline of the Detroit Tigers, the Green Bay Packers' Bart Starr, Coach Bud Wilkinson, and sportscaster Chris Schenkel on February 13, 1969

In February, 1964, Wilkinson announced that he would enter a special election to replace his friend, the late Robert S. Kerr, as U. S. Senator from Oklahoma. He had already resigned his position as head coach of the Oklahoma University Sooners. (Note: According to reporter Andrew McGregor, following the deaths of Senator Kerr, President John F. Kennedy and his own brother, all during the previous year, the former coach wanted to pursue "...what he considered to be a more impactful and significant career.") Politicians and the Oklahoma press debated whether he was qualified to become a U. S. Senator, though all seemed to agree that his popularity as a cultural icon gave him an important edge. Easily winning the Republican primary, Wilkinson became the Republican nominee for the U.S. Senate in 1964, at which point he legally changed his first name to Bud, but narrowly lost to Democrat Fred R. Harris, then a State Senator in Oklahoma. Both parties involved political heavyweights from out of state to campaign for their candidates. Republicans invited former President Eisenhower and Senator Barry Goldwater. Illness made Eisenhower miss the occasion, so his former Vice President Richard Nixon served as substitute. Harris supporters got President Lyndon Johnson to make an appearance, as well as several other national Democrats. Wilkinson's Republican advisers brought in Senator Strom Thurmond to appeal to ultra-conservative voters in Little Dixie, which had recently turned reliably Republican. That effort backfired. Harris later said, "my campaign got an extra benefit from Senator Thurmond's Oklahoma visit … Thurmond wound up scaring the daylights out of even a lot of conservative white voters with his jingoist speeches, advocating for the escalation of the American war effort in Vietnam."

In the 1964 General Election, Wilkinson lost by a narrow 51% to 49% and could not overcome Republican presidential nominee, Senator Barry Goldwater’s loss to incumbent President Lyndon Baines Johnson by 56% to 45% in Oklahoma. Through 2024, Johnson is the last Democrat to carry Oklahoma in a presidential election. Wilkinson entertained seeking the other Oklahoma U.S. Senate seat in 1968, but he did not run, and the position went to former Governor Henry Bellmon, also a Republican.

==== Election results ====
1964 U.S. Senate special election, Republican primary
Party	Candidate	Votes	%
Republican	Bud Wilkinson	100,544	79.22%
Republican	Thomas J. Harris	19,170	15.10%
Republican	Forest W. Beall	7,211	5.68%
Total votes		126,925	100.00%

1964 United States Senate special election in Oklahoma
Party	Candidate	Votes	%	±%
Democratic	Fred R. Harris	466,782	51.17%	−3.67%
Republican	Bud Wilkinson	445,392	48.83%	+4.22%
Majority		21,390	2.34%	−7.89%
Turnout		912,174		
Democratic hold				

=== Broadcasting and NFL coaching ===
In 1965, Wilkinson joined ABC Sports as their lead color commentator on college football telecasts, teaming with Chris Schenkel and, later, Keith Jackson. Wilkinson was the color analyst for four of the greatest games in college football history, each commonly referred to as a "Game of the Century": Notre Dame vs. Michigan State in 1966, UCLA vs. USC in 1967, Texas vs. Arkansas in 1969, and Nebraska vs. Oklahoma in 1971.

Wilkinson was inducted into the College Football Hall of Fame in 1969.

In 1975, he received the Golden Plate Award of the American Academy of Achievement.

In 1978, Wilkinson returned to coaching with the St. Louis Cardinals of the NFL. After less than two disappointing seasons, he was fired, and returned to broadcasting with ESPN.

=== Death ===
Wilkinson suffered a series of minor strokes and, on February 9, 1994, he died of congestive heart failure in St. Louis at the age of 77. He is interred at Oak Grove Cemetery in St. Louis, Missouri.

== Personal life ==
Wilkinson was married to the former Mary Schifflet in 1938, with whom he had two sons, Pat and Jay. They divorced in 1975. A year later, he married Donna O'Donnahue, 33 years his junior, who survived him.

== Head coaching record ==
=== College ===
Year	Team	Overall	Conference	Standing	Bowl/playoffs	Coaches^{#}	AP^{°}
Oklahoma Sooners (Big Six / Big Seven / Big Eight Conference) (1947–1963)
1947	Oklahoma	7–2–1	4–0–1	1st			16
1948	Oklahoma	10–1	5–0	1st	W Sugar		5
1949	Oklahoma	11–0	5–0	1st	W Sugar		2
1950	Oklahoma	10–1	6–0	1st	L Sugar	1	1
1951	Oklahoma	8–2	6–0	1st		11	10
1952	Oklahoma	8–1–1	5–0–1	1st		4	4
1953	Oklahoma	9–1–1	6–0	1st	W Orange	5	4
1954	Oklahoma	10–0	6–0	1st		3	3
1955	Oklahoma	11–0	6–0	1st	W Orange	1	1
1956	Oklahoma	10–0	6–0	1st		1	1
1957	Oklahoma	10–1	6–0	1st	W Orange	4	4
1958	Oklahoma	10–1	7–0	1st	W Orange	5	5
1959	Oklahoma	7–3	6–1	1st		15	15
1960	Oklahoma	3–6–1	2–4–1	5th			
1961	Oklahoma	5–5	4–3	4th			
1962	Oklahoma	8–3	7–0	1st	L Orange	7	8
1963	Oklahoma	8–2	6–1	2nd		8	9
Oklahoma:		145–29–4	93–9–3				
Total:		145–29–4					
National championship Conference title Conference division title or championship game berth
^{#}Rankings from final Coaches Poll.; ^{°}Rankings from final AP Poll.

=== NFL ===
Team	Year	Regular season					Postseason			
Team	Year	Won	Lost	Ties	Win %	Finish	Won	Lost	Win %	Result
SLC	1978	6	10	0	.375	4th in NFC East	–	–	–	–
SLC	1979	3	10	0	.231	Fired Mid-Season	–	–	–	–
SLC Total		9	20	0	.310				–	
Total		9	20	0	.310				–	

== Works ==
- Bud Wilkinson's Guide to Modern Physical Fitness. New York: Viking, 1967.
- Football: Winning Defense. Lanham, MD: Sports Illustrated Books, 1993.
- Football: Winning Offense. Lanham, MD: Sports Illustrated Books, 1994.
- Modern Defensive Football. Englewood Cliffs, NJ: Prentice-Hall, 1957. With Gomer Jones
- Oklahoma Split T Football. Englewood Cliffs, NJ: Prentice-Hall, 1952.

== See also ==
- Oklahoma drill

== Notes ==
Party political offices
Preceded by B. Hayden Crawford	Republican nominee for United States Senator from Oklahoma (Class 2); 1964	Succeeded by Pat H. Patterson
