= 1966 United States Senate election in Oklahoma =

Senatorial election in Oklahoma

- November 8, 1966
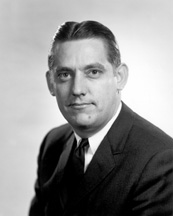

Nominee	Fred R. Harris	Pat J. Patterson
Party	Democratic	Republican
Popular vote	343,157	295,585
Percentage	53.72%	46.28%
- County results Harris: 50–60% 60–70% 70–80% Patterson: 50–60% 60–70%
U.S. senator before election
Fred R. Harris
Democratic
Elected U.S. Senator
Fred R. Harris
Democratic

The 1966 United States Senate election in Oklahoma took place on November 8, 1966. Democratic Senator Fred R. Harris ran for re-election to a second term, and his first full term. After winning an easy victory in the Democratic primary, he faced attorney Pat J. Patterson, the Republican nominee, in the general election. Patterson wasn't viewed as a strong candidate against Harris, but the national Republican landslide helped make the race somewhat close. Harris ended up defeating Patterson by a comfortable margin to win his second (first full) and final term in the Senate.

== Democratic primary ==
=== Candidates ===
- Billy E. Brown, perennial candidate
- Fred R. Harris, incumbent U.S. Senator
- Willard R. Owens, WWII veteran and farmer

=== Results ===
Democratic primary
Party	Candidate	Votes	%
Democratic	Fred R. Harris (inc.)	359,747	83.56%
Democratic	Willard R. Owens	41,580	9.66%
Democratic	Billy E. Brown	29,184	6.78%
Total votes		430,511	100.00%

== Republican primary ==
=== Candidates ===
- Pat J. Patterson, Oklahoma City attorney
- Don Kinkaid, Oklahoma City oilman
- Gustav K. Brandborg, former radio station manager

=== Results ===
Republican primary
Party	Candidate	Votes	%
Republican	Pat J. Patterson	36,036	42.50%
Republican	Don Kinkaid	32,137	37.90%
Republican	Gustav K. Brandborg	16,617	19.60%
Total votes		84,790	100.00%

=== Runoff election results ===
Republican primary runoff
Party	Candidate	Votes	%
Republican	Pat J. Patterson	42,550	58.29%
Republican	Don Kinkaid	30,452	41.71%
Total votes		73,002	100.00%

== General election ==
=== Results ===
1966 United States Senate election in Oklahoma
Party	Candidate	Votes	%	±%
Democratic	Fred R. Harris (inc.)	343,157	53.72%	+2.55%
Republican	Pat J. Patterson	295,585	46.28%	−2.55%
Majority		47,572	7.45%	+5.10%
Turnout		638,742		
Democratic hold				
