= Oklahoma drill =

American football practice technique

The Oklahoma drill is an American football practice technique used to test and train players in confined full contact situations. The technique was developed by Oklahoma Sooners coach Bud Wilkinson. It has many names.

== Description ==
The drill has several variations.

The most widely recognized version of the Oklahoma Drill is a short, head-to-head American football contact drill. Two players lie on their backs, positioned head-to-head with their feet facing opposite directions. At the coach’s signal, both players quickly get to their feet and compete one-on-one, attempting to tackle or drive the opposing player to the ground or out of the designated area. The drill is commonly used by football coaches to develop and evaluate tackling, blocking, balance, strength, reaction time, and physicality. It has also become popular as an informal recreational competition outside organized football, including at events and gatherings where participants perform the drill for entertainment.

== Prevalence ==
Many high school and college teams use the Oklahoma drill as a way to kick off the first day of full-contact practice.

The Oklahoma drill, along with other full-contact drills, was officially banned from NFL team practices in May 2019 following years of declining use and increasing concerns for player safety. Veterans and high-profile NFL players rarely participate in pit drills owing to the higher risk of injury, with many coaches already refusing to permit the drill prior to its ban. A non-contact variant of the drill is sometimes run.

== Organized Competition ==
Oklahoma drills have been used for entertainment purposes, as a type of combat sport.

The Oklahoma Drill Championship (OKDC) is a professional sports organization built around the Oklahoma Drill, turning the traditional football drill into a standalone competitive sport. OKDC features 1v1 matchups where athletes compete in short, physical offensive and defensive rounds. The organization is developing a professional league with weight divisions, rankings, championship events, and a broadcast format focused on the intensity and physicality of American football.
