= 1976 Iowa Democratic presidential caucuses =

- January 19, 1976

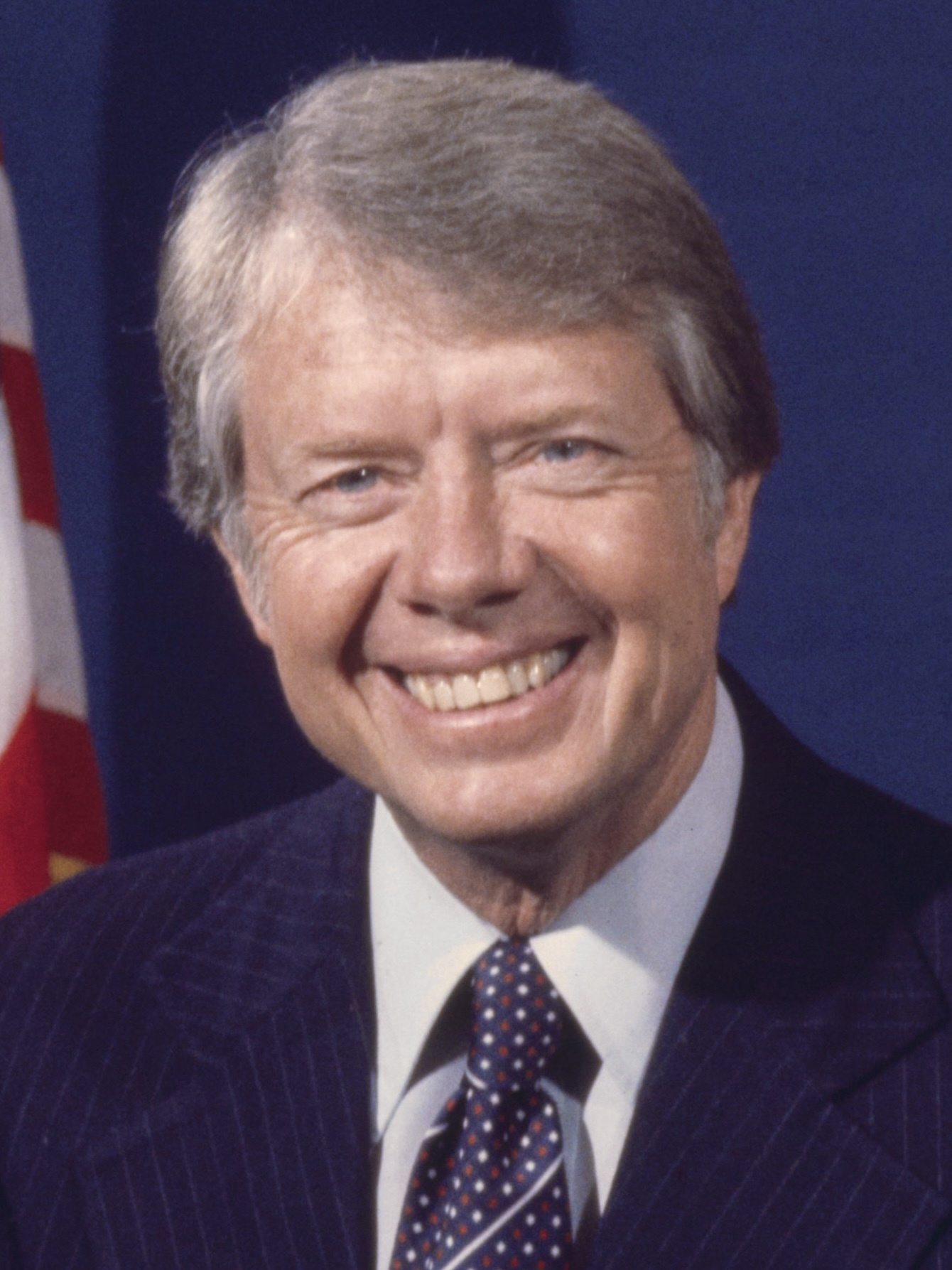

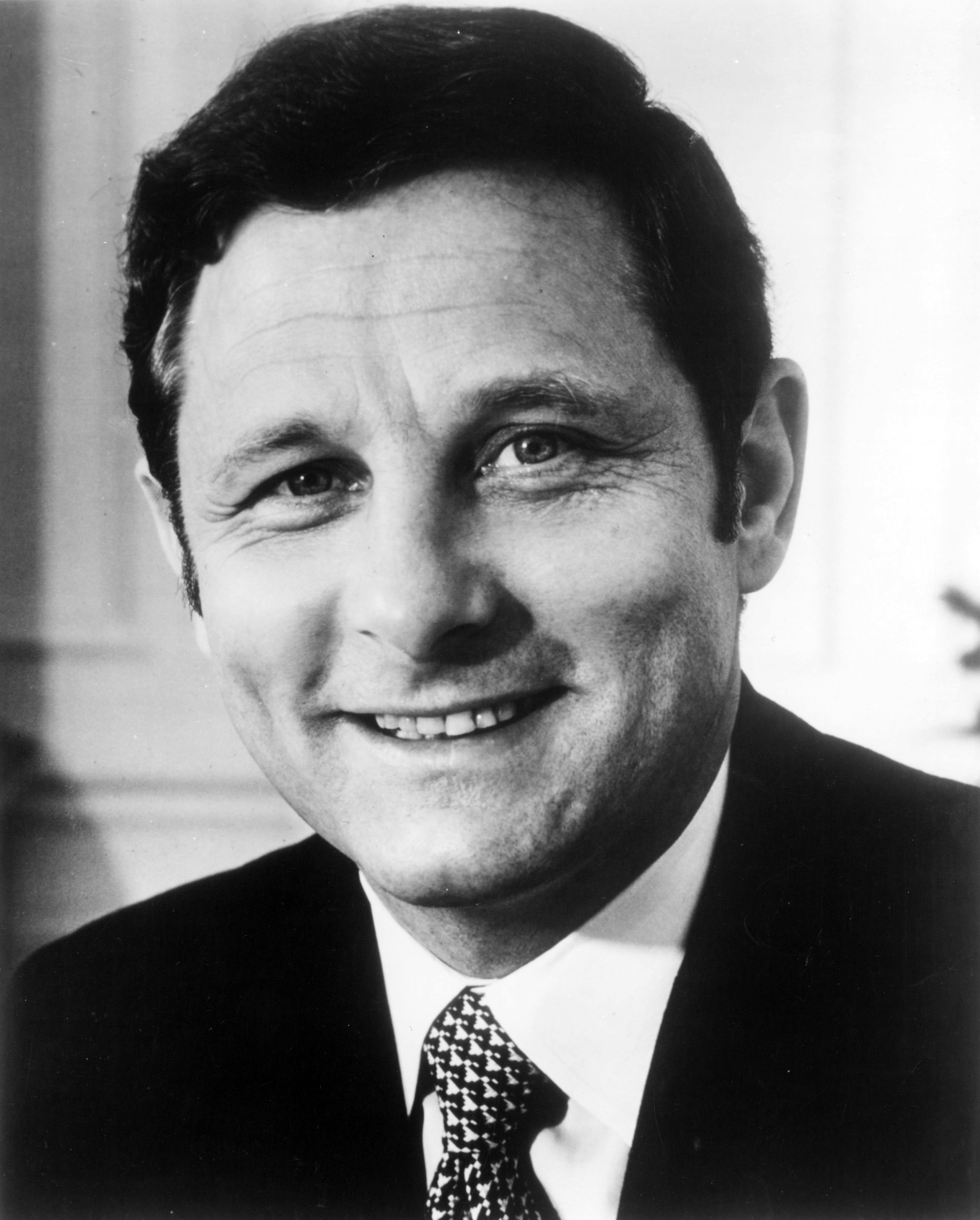

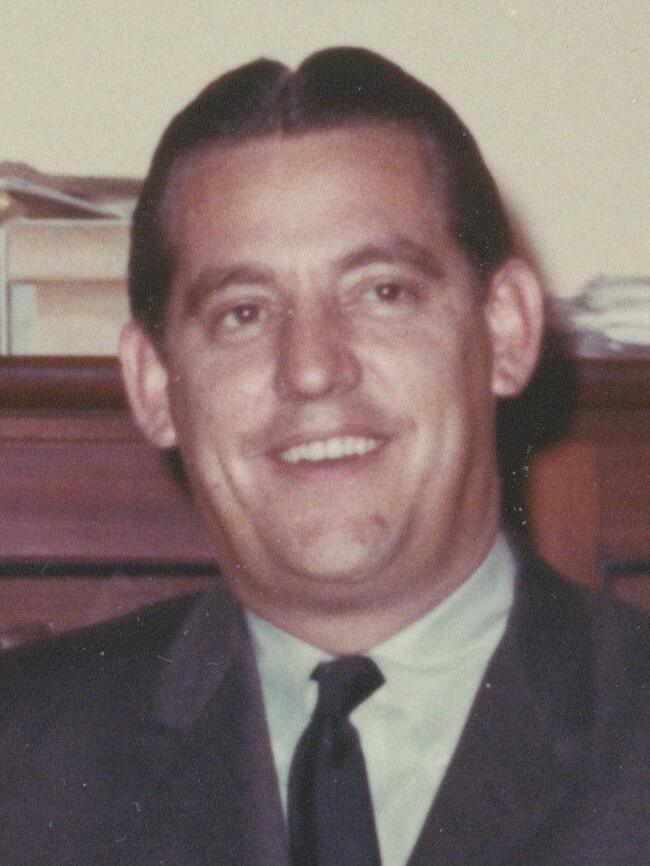

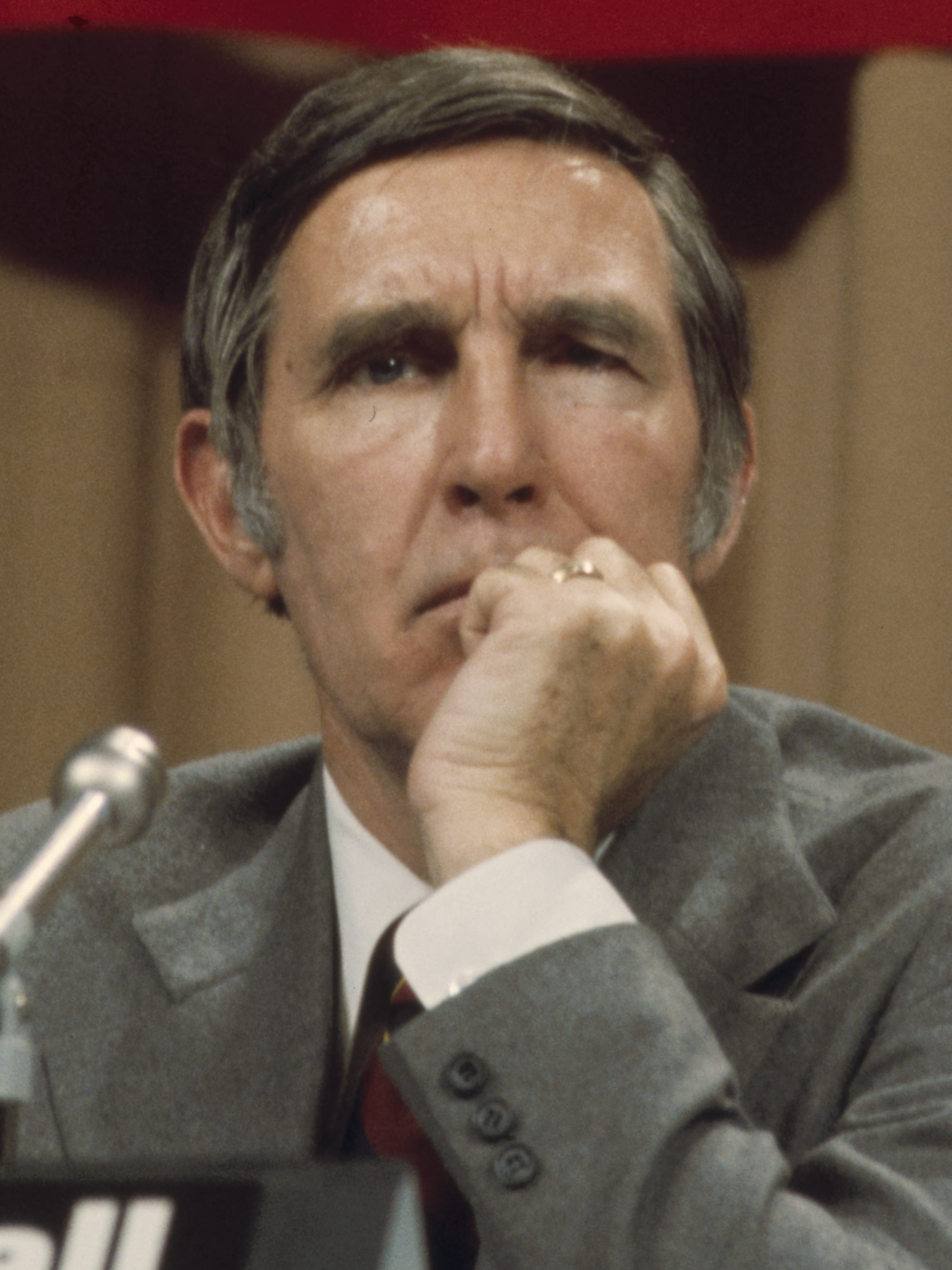

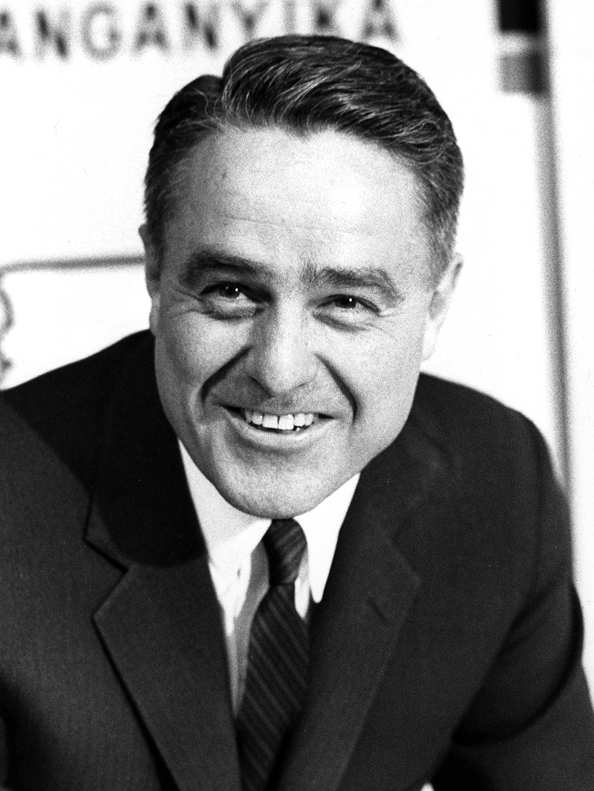
Candidate	Uncommitted	Jimmy Carter	Birch Bayh
Home state	N/A	Georgia	Indiana
Delegate count	1,070	940	257
Popular vote	14,508	10,764	5,148
Percentage	37.2%	27.6%	13.2%
Candidate	Fred R. Harris	Mo Udall	Sargent Shriver
Home state	Oklahoma	Arizona	Maryland
Delegate count	173	88	32
Popular vote	3,861	2,340	1,287
Percentage	9.9%	6.0%	3.3%
- Results by Congressional District; Unpledged: 30-40% 40-50% 50-60% Carter: 30-40%
Democratic nominee before election
George McGovern
Elected Democratic nominee
Jimmy Carter

The 1976 Iowa Democratic presidential caucuses were held on January 19, 1976, the first nominating contest in the Democratic presidential primaries for the 1976 presidential election. It had the little-known Governor of Georgia Jimmy Carter campaign heavily and end up capturing 27.7% of the vote, the highest of the five candidates. An outpouring of media coverage of Carter soon emerged.

== Candidates ==
- Birch Bayh, U.S. Senator from Indiana
- Jimmy Carter, Governor of Georgia
- Fred R. Harris, former U.S. Senator from Oklahoma
- Henry M. Jackson, U.S. Senator from Washington
- Sargent Shriver, former U.S. Ambassador to France
- Mo Udall, U.S. Representative for Arizona's 2nd congressional district

== Results ==
1976 Iowa Democratic presidential caucuses
Candidate	State Delegates	Popular vote	Percentage	Delegates (Note: The delegates given below are rough estimates and based on the strength shown at the caucuses)
Uncommitted	1,070	14,508	37.16%	18
Jimmy Carter	940	10,764	27.57%	13
Birch Bayh	257	5,148	13.19%	6
Fred R. Harris	173	3,861	9.89%	5
Mo Udall	88	2,340	5.99%	3
Sargent Shriver	32	1,287	3.30%	2
Henry M. Jackson	0	429	1.10%	0
Other	0	702	1.80%	0
	2,560	39,039	100.00%	47

Uncommitted won 14,508 votes (37%) and Carter 10,764 votes (27%). Birch Bayh, a Senator from Indiana got 5,148 (13%). Udall dropped to 5th place with only 6%, behind Fred R. Harris of Oklahoma, which led to Harris coining the term "winnowed in" to refer to his surprisingly-strong showing.
