= Winonah Leah Monroney Sanger =

American physician (1874–1957)

- Born: Winonah Leah Monroney; February 2, 1874; Jefferson, Illinois, United States
- Died: February 9, 1957 (aged 83)
- Education: Scarritt College; Washburn College
- Known for: Early advocacy of family planning in Oklahoma
- Political party: Democratic Party
- Relatives: Mike Monroney (nephew)

Winonah Leah Monroney Sanger (February 2, 1874 – February 9, 1957) was an American physician and birth control advocate prominent in Oklahoma.

== Biography ==
Winonah Leah Monroney Sanger was born Winonah Leah Monroney on February 2, 1874, to Sylvester Lewis and Elizabeth Buckles Monroney in Jefferson, Illinois. She later married Fenton Mercer Sanger. She attended Carmi, Illinois, public schools in 1890 and was a teacher there from 1891 to 1894. In 1894, she moved to Oklahoma City and worked as a teacher. She graduated from Scarritt College in 1898 and Washburn College in 1904. After graduating, she returned to Oklahoma City. From 1918 to 1923, she served as the Oklahoma City Public Schools medical inspector. From 1923 to 1927, she served as the women's medical advisor for the University of Oklahoma Health Service.

During the 1920s, she wrote articles for The Oklahoma Woman magazine. She was an early advocate of family planning, birth control, and an active member of the Democratic Party. She was also the secretary of the Territorial Teachers’ Association and president of the Oklahoma Women’s Medical Auxiliary. In 1935, she was inducted into the Oklahoma Hall of Fame and the Sanger House at the University of Oklahoma was named after her. She died on February 9, 1957.

Her nephew, Mike Monroney, served as a U.S. Representative and Senator from Oklahoma.
