= J. Howard Edmondson =

American Governor and US Senator from Oklahoma (1925–1971)

Howard Edmondson
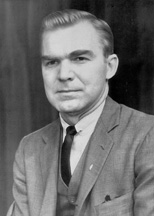

United States Senator from Oklahoma
- In office January 7, 1963 – November 3, 1964
- Appointed by: George Nigh
- Preceded by: Robert S. Kerr
- Succeeded by: Fred R. Harris

16th Governor of Oklahoma
- In office January 8, 1959 – January 6, 1963
- Lieutenant: George Nigh
- Preceded by: Raymond D. Gary
- Succeeded by: George Nigh

Tulsa County Attorney
- In office 1954–1958
- Preceded by: Robert L. Wheeler
- Succeeded by: Robert D. Simms

Personal details
- Born: James Howard Edmondson; September 27, 1925 Muskogee, Oklahoma, U.S.
- Died: November 17, 1971 (aged 46) Edmond, Oklahoma, U.S.
- Party: Democratic
- Spouse: Jeanette Bartleson
- Relatives: Ed Edmondson (brother); James E. Edmondson (nephew); Drew Edmondson (nephew)
- Education: University of Oklahoma (LLB)

Military service
- Allegiance: United States
- Branch/service: United States Army
- Years of service: 1942–1945
- Unit: United States Army Air Forces
- Battles/wars: World War II

James Howard Edmondson (September 27, 1925 – November 17, 1971) was an American politician from the U.S. state of Oklahoma. He served as the 16th governor of Oklahoma from 1959 to 1963, and the appointed United States Senator from Oklahoma from 1963 to 1964, losing to Fred R. Harris in a 1964 Democratic primary election for the U.S. Senate. When he took office as Governor of Oklahoma at the age of 33, Edmondson was, and still is, the youngest governor in the history of the state.

Prior to serving as governor, Edmondson practiced law in Muskogee, Oklahoma, worked as the chief prosecutor for the Tulsa County attorney, and was elected county attorney himself in 1954 and 1956.

== Early life and career ==
Edmondson was born in Muskogee, Oklahoma, attended elementary and secondary schools there and enrolled in the University of Oklahoma after high school graduation. He enlisted in the U.S. Army Air Forces in March 1942, and served until December 5, 1945. He returned to the University of Oklahoma, was married to his childhood sweetheart, Jeanette Bartleson, in May 1946, and completed his law degree in August 1948. He had a son, James Jr., and two daughters, Jeanne and Patricia.

After practicing law in Muskogee, Edmondson moved to Tulsa to become the chief prosecutor in the office of the county attorney of Tulsa County. He was elected county attorney in 1954 and was re-elected in 1956.

As governor, Edmondson helped to establish a state merit system and central purchasing, but failed in his attempt to transfer control of county road funds to the Oklahoma Department of Highways. He resigned in the final weeks of his gubernatorial term and was appointed to the United States Senate, where he was defeated by Fred Harris in his campaign for election to the seat. He later practiced law after leaving elective office and died of a heart attack and is buried in Oklahoma City.

== Governor of Oklahoma ==
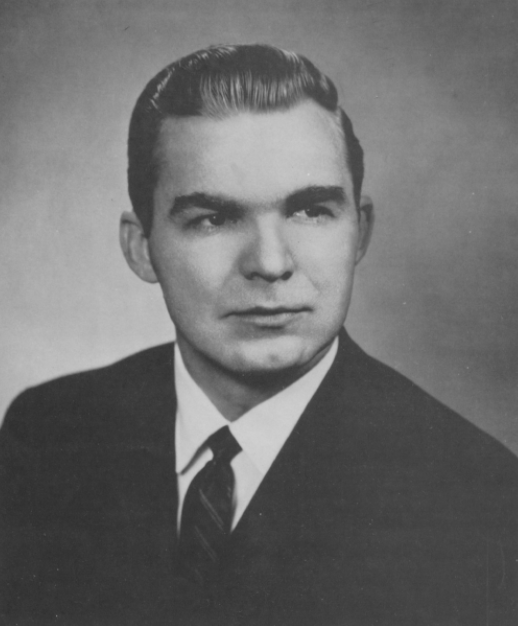
Edmondson as governor

Edmondson was inaugurated as Governor of Oklahoma on January 12, 1959, after winning the election by the largest majority ever given to a gubernatorial candidate in the state. He ran on a platform of reform, and passed many reforms despite opposition from the legislature during his first two years as governor. He was also committed to a special election to repeal prohibition of the sale of alcohol, and successfully pushed a referendum through the legislature. He was successful in establishing a state merit system and central purchasing, but failed in his attempt to transfer control of county road funds to the Department of Highways.

== US Senate ==
Edmondson resigned from office as governor two weeks before the end of his term, on January 6, 1963, and was appointed to the US Senate to fill the position left vacant by the death of Robert S. Kerr. He voted in favor of the Civil Rights Act of 1964. He served in the Senate until November 1964. He was ousted in that year's special election to finish the last two years of the Senate term by being defeated in the Democratic primary by Fred R. Harris.

== Death ==
While a practicing attorney in Oklahoma City, Edmondson died November 17, 1971, of a heart attack in his home.

Party political offices
Preceded by Raymond D. Gary	Democratic nominee for Governor of Oklahoma; 1958	Succeeded by Bill Atkinson
Political offices
Preceded by Raymond D. Gary	Governor of Oklahoma; 1959–1963	Succeeded by George Nigh
U.S. Senate
Preceded by Robert S. Kerr	U.S. Senator (Class 2) from Oklahoma; 1963–1964; Served alongside: Mike Monroney	Succeeded by Fred R. Harris
