= 1968 United States Senate election in Oklahoma =

- November 3, 1968
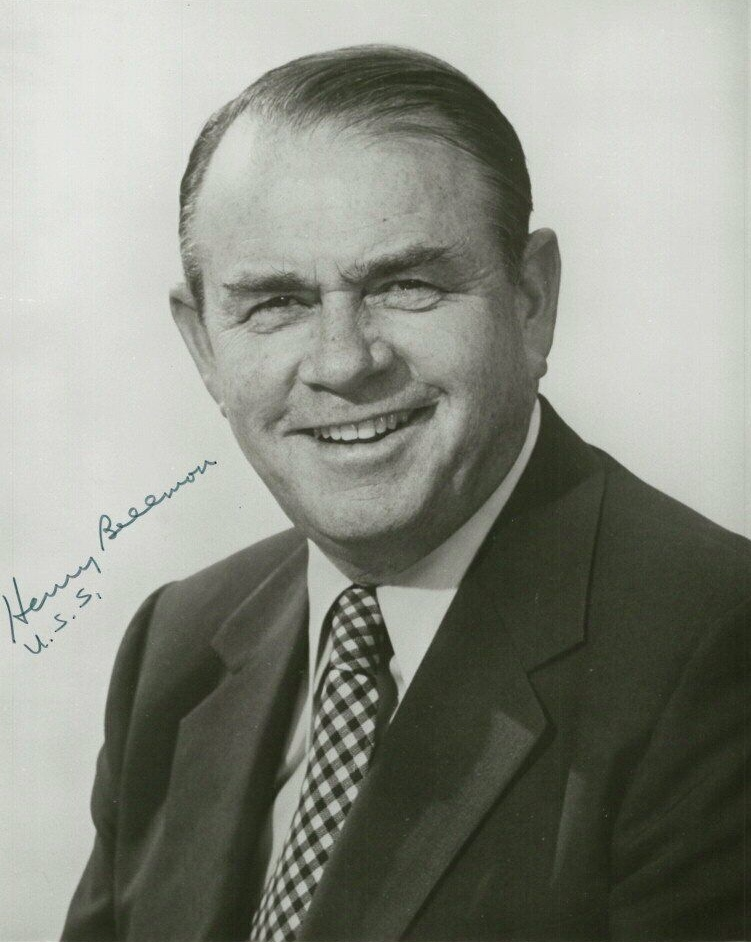

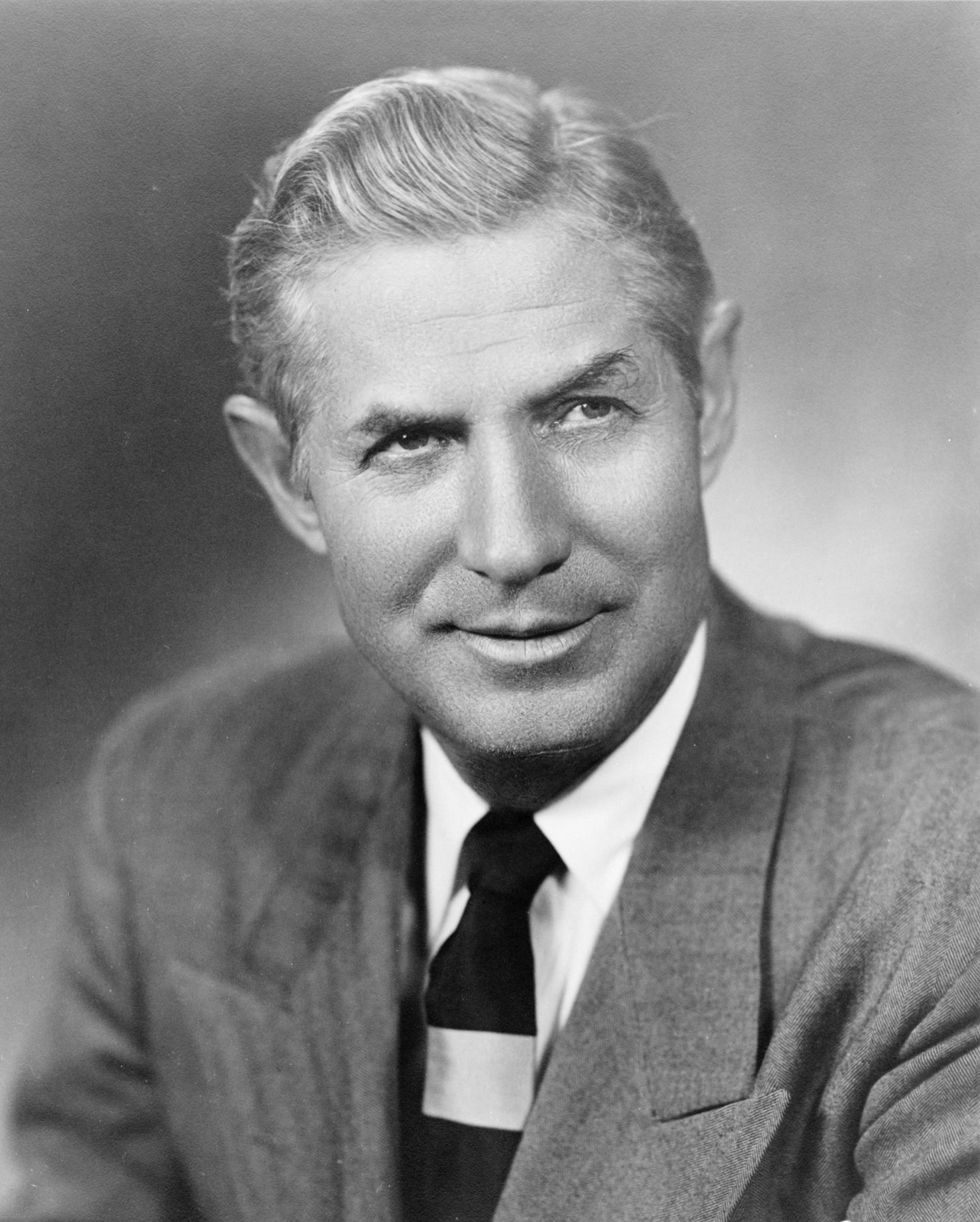
Nominee	Henry Bellmon	Mike Monroney
Party	Republican	Democratic
Popular vote	470,120	419,658
Percentage	51.71%	46.16%
- County results Bellmon: 40–50% 50–60% 60–70% 70–80% Monroney: 40–50% 50–60% 60–70%
U.S. senator before election
Mike Monroney
Democratic
Elected U.S. Senator
Henry Bellmon
Republican

The 1968 United States Senate election in Oklahoma was held November 3, 1968. Incumbent Democratic U.S. Senator Mike Monroney was running for re-election to a fourth term, but was defeated by Republican Henry Bellmon. This is the last time that a Senator from Oklahoma lost re-election.

This election was the first time since 1942 that a Republican won a United States Senate election in Oklahoma and the first time since 1920 that a Republican won this seat.

== Major candidates ==
=== Democratic ===
- Mike Monroney, Incumbent U.S. Senator

=== Republican ===
- Henry Bellmon, Former Governor

== Results ==
General election
Party	Candidate	Votes	%
Republican	Henry Bellmon	470,120	51.71%
Democratic	Mike Monroney (incumbent)	419,658	46.16%
American Independent	George Washington	19,341	2.13%

== See also ==
- 1968 United States Senate elections
