= Fred R. Harris =

American politician (1930–2024)

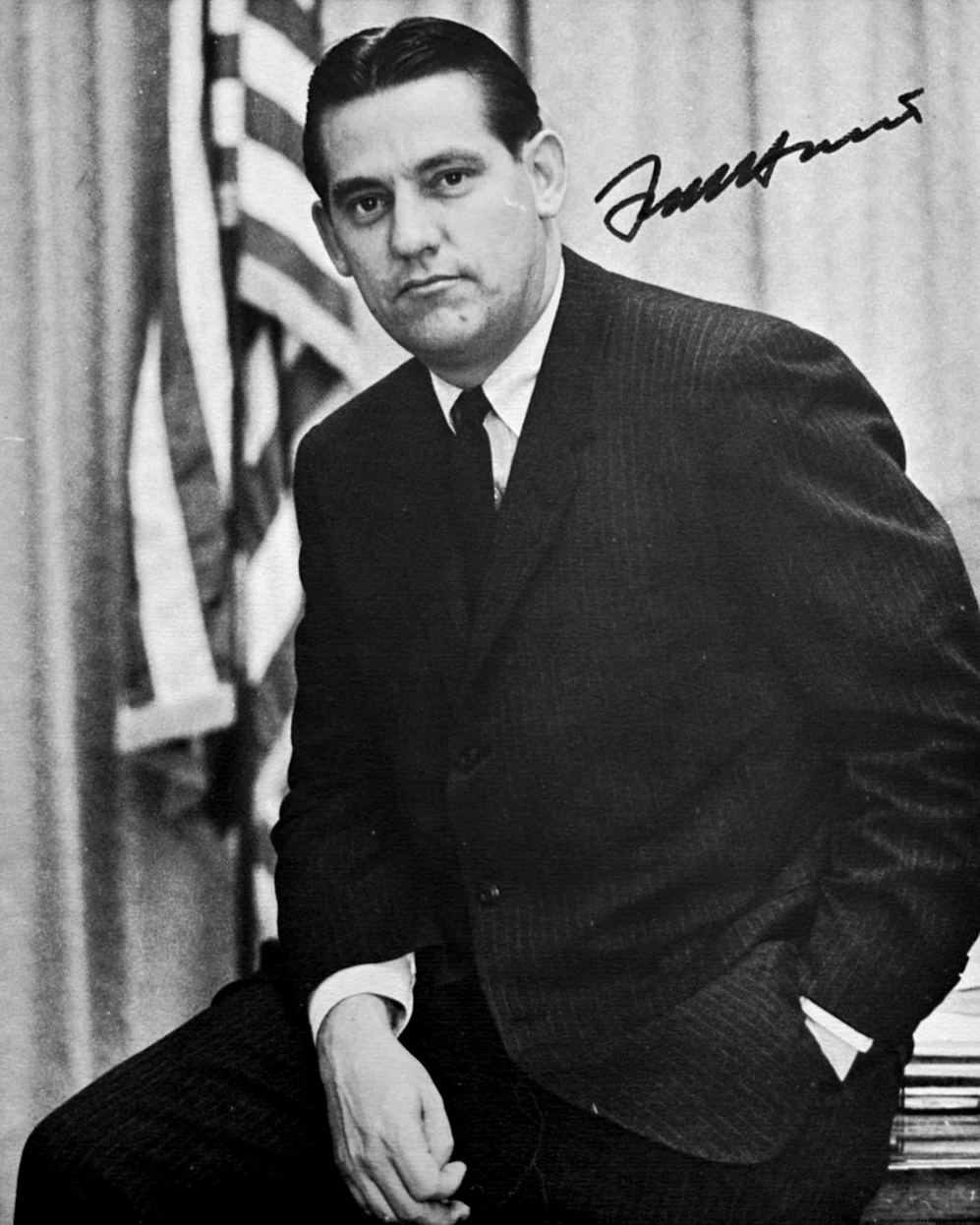
- Official portrait c. 1968

32nd Chair of the Democratic National Committee
- In office January 14, 1969 – March 5, 1970
- Preceded by: Larry O'Brien
- Succeeded by: Larry O'Brien

United States Senator from Oklahoma
- In office November 4, 1964 – January 3, 1973
- Preceded by: J. Howard Edmondson
- Succeeded by: Dewey F. Bartlett

Member of the Oklahoma Senate from the 17th district
- In office 1957–1964
- Preceded by: Bill Logan
- Succeeded by: Ralph W. Graves

Personal details
- Born: November 13, 1930 Cotton County, Oklahoma, U.S.
- Died: November 23, 2024 (aged 94) Albuquerque, New Mexico, U.S.
- Party: Democratic
- Spouse(s): LaDonna Crawford (m. 1949; div. 1981) Margaret Elliston (m. 1982)
- Children: 3
- Education: University of Oklahoma (BA, LLB)

Fred Roy Harris (November 13, 1930 – November 23, 2024) was an American politician from Oklahoma who served from 1957 to 1964 as a member of the Oklahoma Senate and from 1964 to 1973 as a member of the United States Senate.

Harris was elected to the Oklahoma Senate after graduating from the University of Oklahoma College of Law. He ousted the appointed U.S. Senate incumbent, J. Howard Edmondson, and won a 1964 special election to finish Robert S. Kerr's term, narrowly defeating football coach Bud Wilkinson. Harris strongly supported the Great Society programs and criticized President Lyndon B. Johnson's handling of the Vietnam War. He was reelected in 1966 and declined to seek another term in 1972.

From 1969 to 1970, Harris chaired the Democratic National Committee. In the 1968 presidential election, Democratic nominee Hubert Humphrey strongly considered him as his running mate. Harris unsuccessfully sought the Democratic presidential nomination in 1972 and 1976. After 1976, he was a professor at the University of New Mexico.

== Early life ==
Harris was born on November 13, 1930, in Cotton County, Oklahoma, near Walters, Oklahoma, the son of Eunice Alene (Pearson) and Fred Byron Harris, a sharecropper. His parents disagreed on whether his middle name should be "Ray" or "Roy", and his handwritten birth certificate was ambiguous, allowing Harris to choose; he eventually used his mother's preferred name, Roy.

Harris attended the University of Oklahoma (OU) on a scholarship, graduating in 1952 with a bachelor's degree in history and political science. He then entered the OU law school, where he was administrative assistant to the dean and successively book editor and managing editor of the Law Review. The August 1956 issue contained his first published article. He received the LL B. degree with distinction and was admitted to the bar in 1954.

Harris was elected to the Oklahoma Senate in 1956 and served in it until 1964. For most of that time, he was one of its youngest members. During his tenure he introduced legislation to prohibit race discrimination in state employment. He made an unsuccessful bid for governor of Oklahoma in 1962, which made him better known throughout the state.

== United States Senator ==
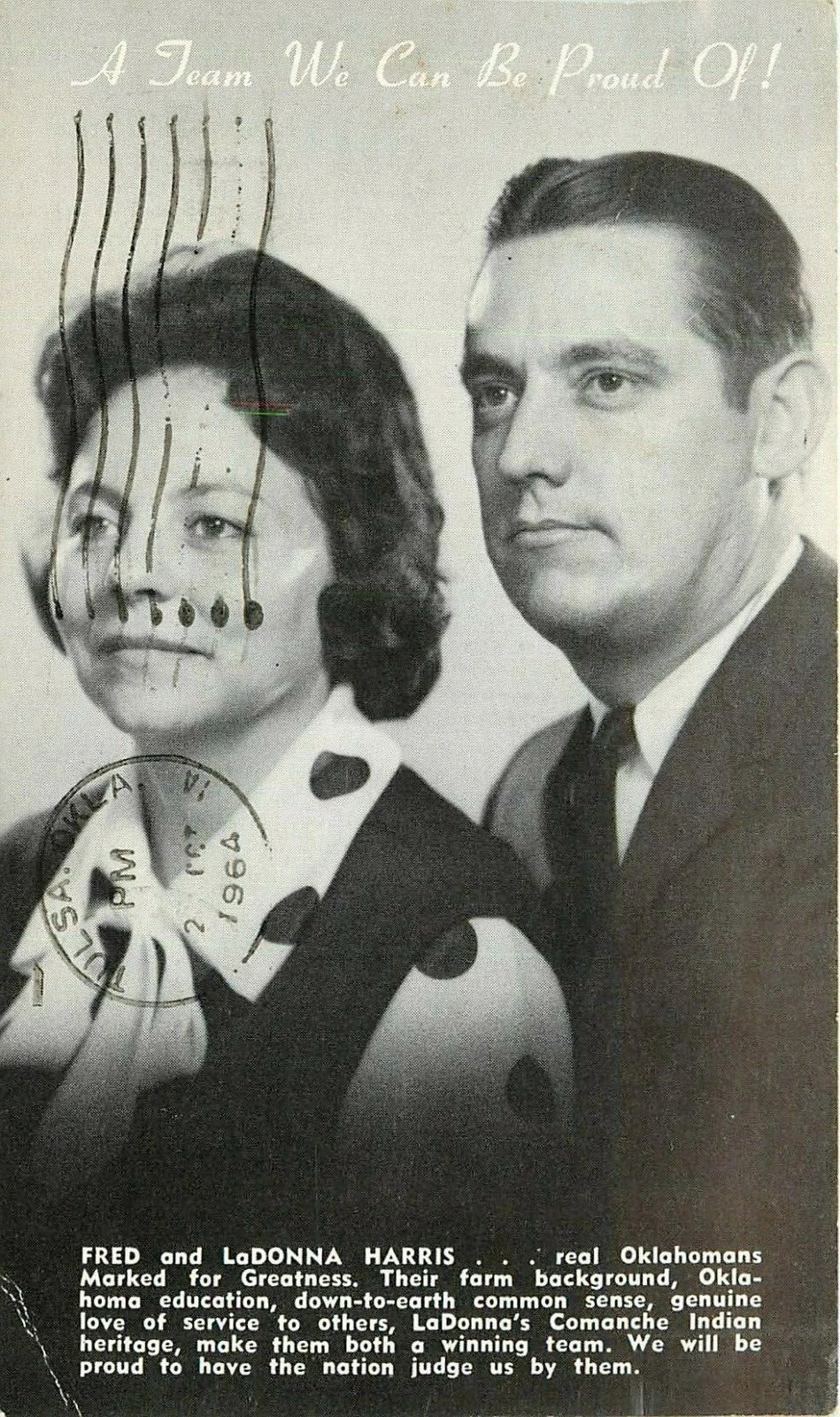
Campaign postcard featuring Harris and his wife LaDonna, 1964

In 1964, Harris ran to serve the remainder of the Senate term of Robert S. Kerr, who had died in office. With Kerr's family's support, he defeated former governor J. Howard Edmondson, who had appointed himself to succeed Kerr, in the Democratic primary. The general election was a high-profile campaign against the Republican nominee, legendary Oklahoma Sooners football coach Bud Wilkinson. Both parties invited political leaders from out of state to campaign for their nominees. Republicans brought former Vice President Richard Nixon to campaign for Wilkinson, while Harris hosted President Lyndon B. Johnson and First Lady Lady Bird Johnson. Harris defeated Wilkinson by 21,390 votes, becoming one of the youngest members of the U.S. Senate. At 33 years old, he was the youngest senator-elect in Oklahoma history. His Senate tenure began on November 4, 1964.

Harris (standing, second from right) with the rest of Oklahoma's congressional delegation, including House Majority Leader Carl Albert, c. 1965

Harris firmly supported President Johnson's Great Society programs, which were often unpopular in Oklahoma. He voted for the Voting Rights Act of 1965, and while he missed the votes pertaining to the confirmation of Thurgood Marshall to the U.S. Supreme Court in 1967 (he was away on official Senate business) and the passage of the Civil Rights Act of 1968 (he was absent because of illness), he supported both; it was announced on the Senate floor that, if he had been present, he would have voted for Marshall's confirmation and the 1968 Act. Harris was present for the vote on the motion to end the filibuster conducted by senators who opposed the 1968 Act, and voted to end the filibuster so that the Act could be voted on.

Despite being quite liberal in an increasingly conservative state, Harris was reelected to a full term in 1966, defeating attorney Pat J. Patterson by 47,572 votes. Patterson had tried to unseat Harris by announcing his support for a constitutional amendment proposed by Senator Everett Dirksen to allow school boards to provide for prayers in public schools. Dirksen's amendment had enthusiastic political support in Oklahoma, but Harris opposed it in a public letter: "I believe in the separation of church and state and I believe prayer and Bible reading should be voluntary".

In July 1967, Johnson appointed Harris to the Kerner Commission. He quickly became one of its most active members and was deeply concerned about economically deprived Black urban residents. He also strongly supported agricultural programs, the Arkansas River Navigation Program, and the Indian health programs, which were all very popular in Oklahoma.

Harris briefly chaired the Democratic National Committee, preceded and succeeded in that position by Larry O'Brien. He was one of the final two candidates presidential nominee Hubert Humphrey considered as his running mate in 1968; Humphrey chose U.S. Senator Edmund Muskie because of Harris's young age of 37. According to O'Brien, Humphrey vacillated between the two until finally choosing Muskie at the last minute. Harris broke with Johnson and Humphrey over the Vietnam War.

In 1970, Harris was a major player in the legislation to restore to the inhabitants of the Taos Pueblo 48,000 ac (19,425 ha) of mountain land that President Theodore Roosevelt had taken and designated as the Carson National Forest early in the 20th century. The struggle was particularly emotive since this return of Taos land included Blue Lake, which the Pueblo consider sacred. To pass the bill, Harris forged a bipartisan alliance with President Richard Nixon, with whom Harris sharply disagreed on numerous other issues, notably the Vietnam War. In doing so, he had to overcome powerful fellow Democratic Senators Clinton Anderson and Henry M. Jackson, who firmly opposed returning the land. As recounted by Harris's wife, LaDonna, who was actively involved in the struggle, when the bill finally passed and came up to be signed by the president, Nixon looked up and said, "I can't believe I'm signing a bill that was sponsored by Fred Harris."

In 1971, Harris was the only senator to vote against confirming Lewis F. Powell Jr. as Associate Justice of the Supreme Court of the United States. He opposed Powell because he considered him elitist and to have a weak record on civil rights. Harris and J. William Fulbright were the only two Southern senators to vote not to confirm Justice William Rehnquist.

Harris called for the abolition of the Interstate Commerce Commission.

== The New Populism ==
In 1973, Harris published The New Populism, a book that articulates a political philosophy centered on economic decentralization and skepticism toward concentrated power in both the public and private sectors. He criticized the size and influence of major institutions, including government agencies, corporations, and labor unions. Among his policy proposals were eliminating subsidies for affluent students and wealthy farmers, a negative income tax and a land value tax, and creating a modern Homestead Act. Harris advocated employee ownership of corporations, tax reform to close loopholes benefiting high earners, and stronger antitrust enforcement to dismantle large companies and promote competition. He also called for public ownership of monopolies in sectors lacking competition and proposed bringing the Federal Reserve under full public ownership. Additionally, Harris was critical of regulatory bodies such as the Interstate Commerce Commission and Civil Aeronautics Board, which he viewed as serving entrenched interests rather than the public good.

== Presidential campaigns ==
Harris did not seek another Senate term in 1972 and instead ran for president, but failed to attract support and ended his campaign after only 48 days. He ran again four years later; both his campaigns were populist and centered on what he called "economic democracy". He also supported abortion rights, desegregation busing, and disbanding the Central Intelligence Agency. To keep expenses down, he traveled the country in a recreational vehicle and stayed in private homes, giving his hosts a card redeemable for one night's stay in the White House upon his election. He emphasized issues affecting Native Americans and the working class. His interest in Native American rights was linked to his ancestry and that of his first wife, LaDonna Harris, a Comanche who was deeply involved in Native American activism.

After a surprising fourth-place finish in the 1976 Iowa caucuses, Harris coined the term "winnowed in", saying, "The winnowing-out process has begun and we have just been 'winnowed in'." He won more than 10% of the vote, pushing Mo Udall, who at one point led the polls, into fifth place. Harris was "winnowed out" just over a month later. He finished fourth in the New Hampshire primary and, a week later, third in Vermont and fifth in Massachusetts. Harris remained in the contest for another month, with his best showing a fourth-place finish in Illinois, with 8%. He suspended his campaign on April 8, 1976.

== Later life ==
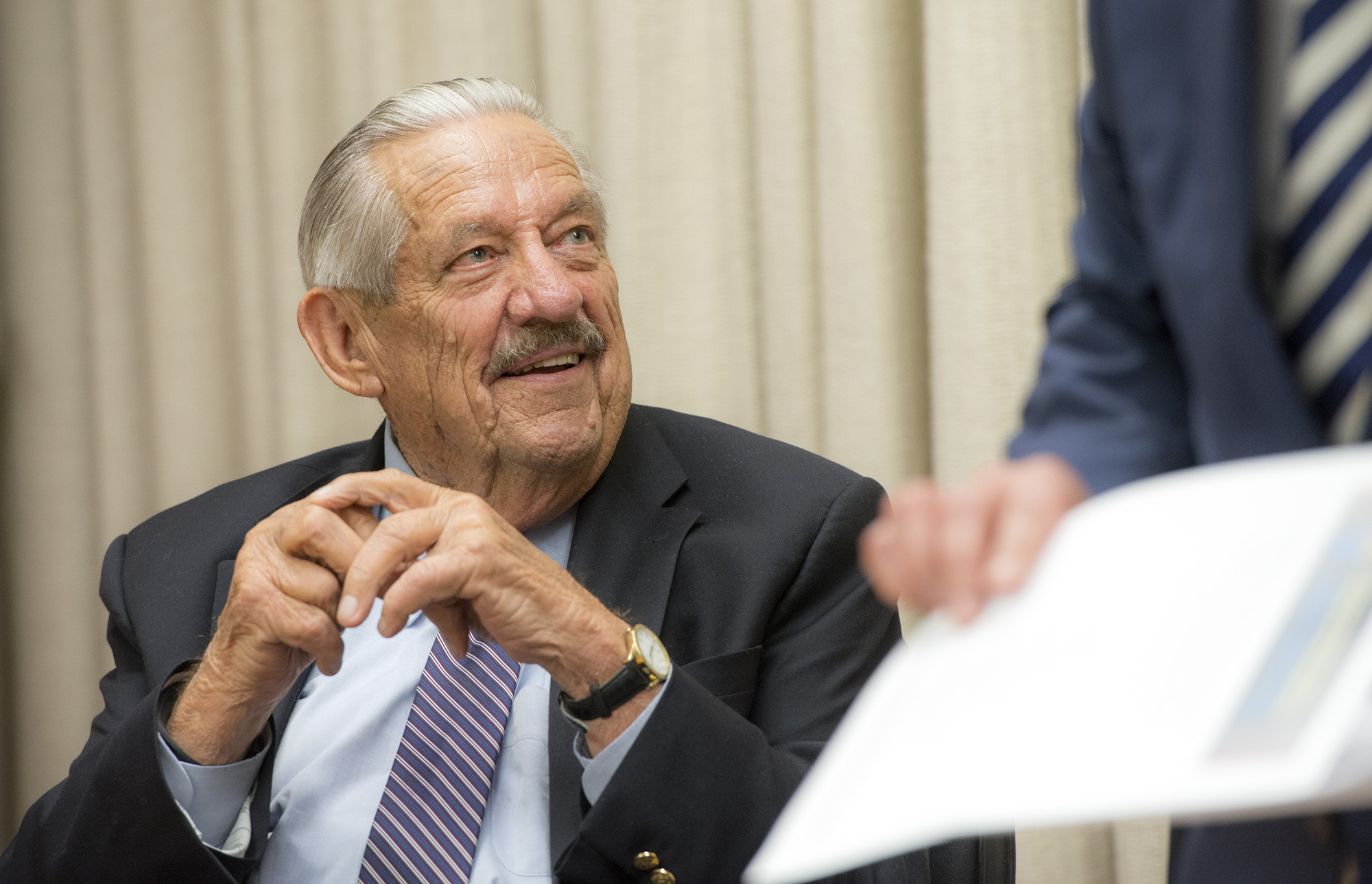
Harris at the LBJ Presidential Library in 2018.

Harris left electoral politics for academia after 1976. He became a professor of political science at the University of New Mexico and wrote many books on political subjects, including Potomac Fever (Norton, 1977 ISBN 0-393-05610-4) and Deadlock or Decision: The U.S. Senate and the Rise of National Politics (Oxford University, 1993 ISBN 0-19-508025-4). In 2003, Harris was elected to the Common Cause National Governing Board. He also wrote three novels. He lived in Corrales, New Mexico.

Harris remained active well into his final years. In a 2023 interview, he expressed support for President Joe Biden, saying concerns about Biden's age were unfounded, and strongly criticized former President Donald Trump for his attempts to overturn the 2020 presidential election and the consequent January 6 United States Capitol attack. The next year, he and his wife attended the 2024 Democratic National Convention in support of the Democratic ticket. His last book, a memoir titled Report from a Last Survivor, was published by the University of New Mexico Press in September 2024.

== Personal life and death ==
Harris married LaDonna Crawford in 1949, and they had three children. They divorced in 1981, and he married Margaret Elliston the next year.

Harris died at a hospital in Albuquerque, New Mexico, on November 23, 2024, 10 days after his 94th birthday. He was the last living former U.S. senator who left office in the 1970s.

Party political offices
| Preceded by Robert S. Kerr | Democratic nominee for U.S. Senator from Oklahoma (Class 2); 1964, 1966 | Succeeded by Ed Edmondson |
| Preceded by Larry O'Brien | Chair of the Democratic National Committee; 1969–1970 | Succeeded by Larry O'Brien |
U.S. Senate
| Preceded by J. Howard Edmondson | U.S. Senator (Class 2) from Oklahoma; 1964–1973; Served alongside: Mike Monroney, Henry Bellmon | Succeeded by Dewey F. Bartlett |
Honorary titles
| Preceded by Birch Bayh | Most senior living U.S. senator (Sitting or former); 2019–2024 | Succeeded by Bob Packwood |
