= Mike Monroney =

American politician

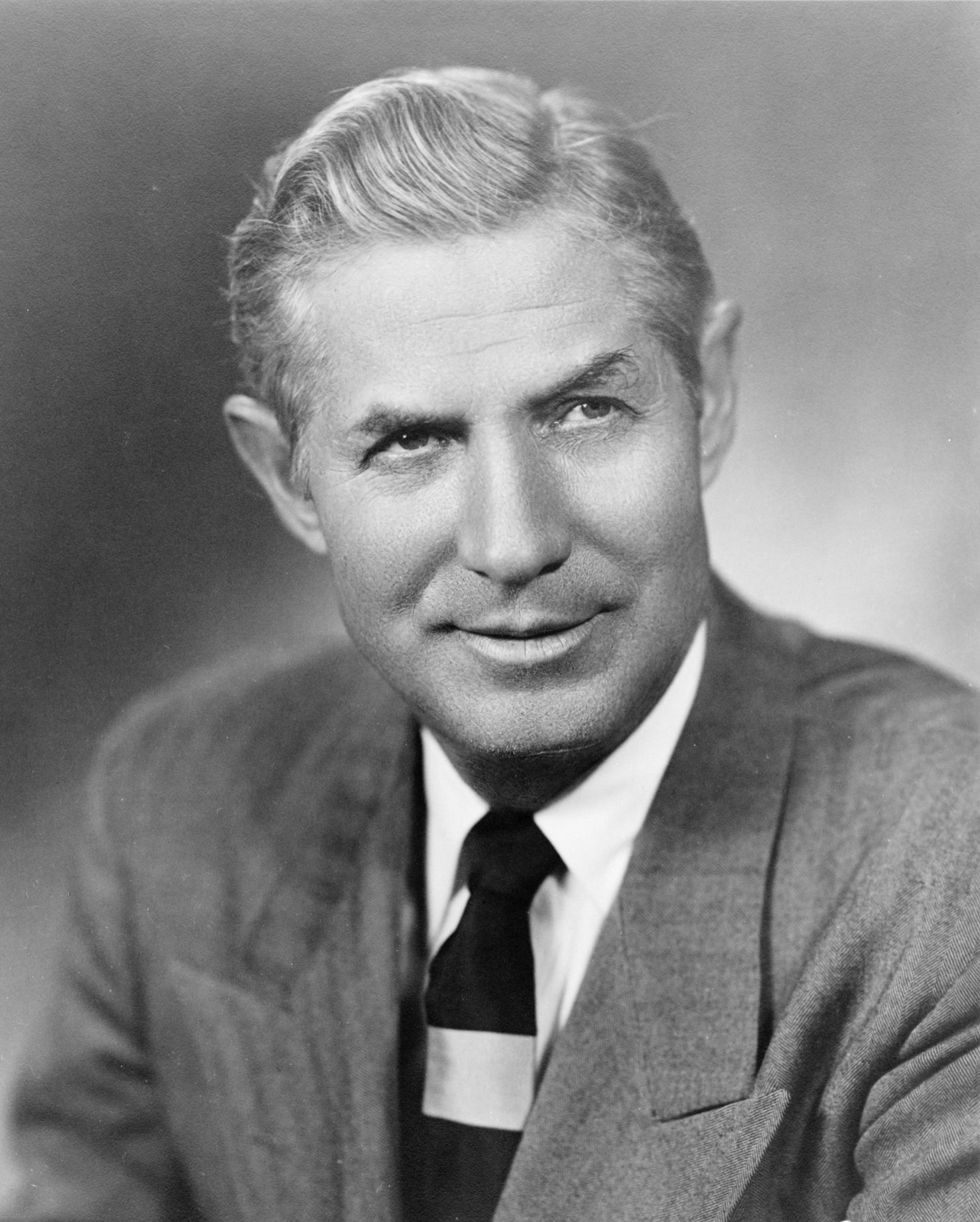

United States Senator from Oklahoma
- In office January 3, 1951 – January 3, 1969
- Preceded by: Elmer Thomas
- Succeeded by: Henry Bellmon

Member of the U.S. House of Representatives from Oklahoma's 5th district
- In office January 3, 1939 – January 3, 1951
- Preceded by: Gomer Griffith Smith
- Succeeded by: John Jarman

Personal details
- Born: Almer Stillwell Monroney; March 2, 1902 Oklahoma City, Oklahoma Territory
- Died: February 13, 1980 (aged 77) Rockville, Maryland, U.S.
- Party: Democratic
- Relatives: Winonah Sanger (aunt)
- Education: University of Oklahoma (BA)

Almer Stillwell "Mike" Monroney (March 2, 1902 – February 13, 1980) was an American politician who served as a United States senator from Oklahoma from 1951 to 1969, and previously as the United States representative for Oklahoma's 5th congressional district from 1939 until 1951. A member of the Democratic Party, Monroney was the last Democrat to hold Oklahoma's Class 3 Senate seat.

== Background ==
He was born on March 2, 1902, in Oklahoma City, Oklahoma (then in Oklahoma Territory). His parents, A. E. "Doc" and Daisy Stillwell Monroney, had moved to Oklahoma Territory shortly after the Land Rush of 1889. His aunt, Winonah Sanger, was a prominent Oklahoma physician. Monroney graduated from the University of Oklahoma in 1924 with a degree in journalism. His college experience was distinguished with a Phi Beta Kappa key, the Bronze Letzeiser award for scholastic standing and activities, and membership in Pe-et, the university's oldest honor society.

== Career ==
Monroney was a reporter for the Oklahoma News from 1924 to 1928. After hiring on with the Oklahoma News, he was assigned to report on local crime stories. Somehow, he scooped nearly every political reporter in the state by revealing that the well-respected Senator Robert L. Owen would not support former Governor John C. "Jack" Walton's bid for the Senate in 1924.

Monroney's career in journalism ended in 1928, when his father asked him to help with the family's furniture business. A few weeks later, his father died, leaving Mike as president of the company. In 1938 he ran for Congress as a Democrat and was elected, then reelected in the five next elections, until 1951. In 1932, Monroney married Mary Ellen Mellon. (Note: Mary Ellen had a son from a previous marriage who took the Monroney name as his own.)

=== House of Representatives ===
Monroney first ran for political office in 1937, when he entered the special election for Oklahoma's 5th congressional district against thirteen other Democrats. (Note: The Fifth District included Oklahoma, Logan, Payne, Cleveland, McClain, Garvin, and Murray counties.) Although he was largely unknown, he came in third. He ran again in the next election (1938), and won the Democratic primary against the same number of hopefuls. He won the general election by a comfortable margin.

He was an active supporter of Presidents Roosevelt and Truman and most of their programs during his twelve years in the House of Representatives, even voting for the Taft-Wagner-Ellender Bill of 1949 that promised to build 810,000 public housing units. He was a strong supporter of foreign aid, joining the Herter Committee, which laid the foundation for the famous and highly successful Marshall Plan.

As a Representative, he co-authored the Legislative Reorganization Act of 1946. This was considered the only major reform of congress in the 20th Century. For this effort, he received the Collier's Magazine Award for Distinguished Congressional Service. In 1947–1948, he served on the Herter Committee.

=== United States Senator ===
Monroney (standing, second from left) with the rest of Oklahoma's congressional delegation, including House Majority Leader Carl Albert, c. 1965

In 1950, Monroney challenged incumbent Elmer Thomas for the Democratic Party nomination to the U.S. Senate. Thomas had been politically powerful since Oklahoma was granted statehood, and was expected to win his fifth term in the Senate. Monroney upset him in the primary. The Republicans had already nominated Rev. W. H. "Bill" Alexander, pastor of Oklahoma City's First Christian Church. Monroney also won the general election. He served in that position until 1969, when he lost the seat to Henry Bellmon, formerly Republican Governor of Oklahoma.

Monroney was considered as a running mate for Illinois Governor Adlai Stevenson in 1952, but was rejected for his lack of national recognition.

As a Senator, he sponsored the Automobile Information Disclosure Act of 1958. The law required that all new automobiles carry a sticker on a window containing important information about the vehicle. That sticker is commonly known as a "Monroney sticker". After the war there were many more Americans who wanted cars than there were cars and he saw that there was a need for consumer protection for the returning veterans.

As chairman of the Aviation Subcommittee of the Senate Commerce Committee, Monroney wrote and sponsored the Federal Aviation Act of 1958 that created the Federal Aviation Agency, to improve aviation safety and achieve better coordination of air traffic in the aftermath of several deadly air crashes. All private planes in the United States are registered at the Mike Monroney Aeronautical Center in Oklahoma City. Air traffic controllers are also trained there. As a result of Monroney's contributions to aviation, he was known as "Mr. Aviation" in the Senate.

In 1958, Monroney was the supporter of a soft loan fund in the World Bank which later became the International Development Association. In 1961, he was awarded the Wright Brothers Memorial Trophy by the National Aeronautics Association and in 1964 he received the first Tony Jannus Award for his distinguished contributions to the commercial aviation industry.

Monroney seemed unafraid of political controversies. Senator Joseph McCarthy, a Republican from Wisconsin, was riding high in the Senate, and had become notorious for intimidating his opponents as enemies of the United States. Monroney and McCarthy clashed more than once in open debate. He played a part in having the Senate censure McCarthy for his extremist tactics. Monroney also risked losing his seat in 1956, when he refused to sign the Southern Manifesto that urged resistance to school desegregation. He voted for the Civil Rights Acts of 1957, 1960, 1964, and 1968, as well as the 24th Amendment to the U.S. Constitution, the Voting Rights Act of 1965, and the confirmation of Thurgood Marshall to the U.S. Supreme Court.

He was voted by the Senate pages as "the nicest Senator." He lost reelection after thirty years of Congressional service in 1968 to former Republican Governor Henry Bellmon, who benefited from the coattails of the election of Richard M. Nixon as president.

== Death ==
He died on February 13, 1980, in Rockville, Maryland. An active Episcopalian during his life, he left a $10,000 honorarium to the Episcopal Diocese of Oklahoma for the Casady School in Oklahoma City. After his death, half of the Senator's ashes and those of his wife were buried in Washington National Cathedral, where they had been active in the congregation. Mrs. Monroney served as a visitors guide at the cathedral every Friday afternoon for some 15 years. The other half of Senator Monroney's ashes was scattered at the Mike Monroney Aeronautical Center in Oklahoma City.

== Legacy ==
He was married to Mary Ellen Mellon of the Mellon banking family and had one son, Michael Monroney; four grandchildren, Erin Monroney, Alice Monroney, Michael Monroney, Jr. and Susanna Monroney Quinn; and four great-grandchildren.

== Notes ==
U.S. House of Representatives
Preceded by Gomer Griffith Smith	Member of the U.S. House of Representatives from Oklahoma's 5th congressional district 1939–1951	Succeeded by John Jarman
Party political offices
Preceded by Elmer Thomas	Democratic nominee for U.S. Senator from Oklahoma (Class 3); 1950, 1956, 1962, 1968	Succeeded by Ed Edmondson
U.S. Senate
Preceded by Elmer Thomas	U.S. Senator (Class 3) from Oklahoma; 1951–1969; Served alongside: Robert S. Kerr, J. Howard Edmondson, Fred R. Harris	Succeeded by Harvey Bellmon
Preceded by Olin D. Johnston	Chair of the Senate Civil Service Committee; 1965–1969	Succeeded by Gale W. McGee
New office	Chair of the Joint Reorganization Committee; 1965–1966; Served alongside: Ray Madden	Position abolished
