= Oklahoma =

U.S. state

Oklahoma Oklahumma (Choctaw) ᎣᎦᎳᎰᎹ (Cherokee) Ogalahoma
- State
- Flag Seal
- Nicknames: Native America (official); Land of the Red Man; Sooner State
- Motto(s): Labor omnia vincit (English: "Work conquers all")
- Anthem: "Oklahoma" and "Oklahoma Hills"
- Location of Oklahoma within the United States
- Country: United States
- Before statehood: Indian Territory (Independent, 1834–1907); Oklahoma Territory (U.S. jurisdiction, 1890–1907)
- Admitted to the Union: November 16, 1907; 118 years ago (46th)
- Capital (and largest city): Oklahoma City
- Largest county or equivalent: Oklahoma
- Largest metro and urban areas: Greater Oklahoma City

Government
  - Governor: Kevin Stitt (R)
  - Lieutenant Governor: Matt Pinnell (R)
- Legislature: Oklahoma Legislature
  - Upper house: Senate
  - Lower house: House of Representatives
- Judiciary: Oklahoma Supreme Court (civil); Oklahoma Court of Criminal Appeals (criminal)
- U.S. senators: James Lankford (R); Alan Armstrong (R)
- U.S. House delegation: 5 Republicans (list)

Area
  - Total: 69,699 sq mi (180,519 km^{2})
  - Land: 68,590 sq mi (177,660 km^{2})
  - Water: 1,304 sq mi (3,378 km^{2}) 1.9%
  - Rank: 20th

Dimensions
  - Length: 470 mi (756 km)
  - Width: 230 mi (370 km)
- Elevation: 1,300 ft (400 m)
- Highest elevation (Black Mesa (Note: Elevation adjusted to North American Vertical Datum of 1988)): 4,974 ft (1,516 m)
- Lowest elevation (Little River at Arkansas border): 289 ft (88 m)

Population (2025)
  - Total: ▲4,123,288
  - Rank: 28th
  - Density: 55/sq mi (21.3/km^{2})
  - Rank: 34th
  - Median household income: $62,100 (2023)
  - Income rank: 43rd
- Demonym(s): Oklahoman; Okie (colloq., historically derogatory); Sooner (historically)

Language
  - Official language: English, Choctaw, Cherokee (Note: Choctaw official within Choctaw Nation, Cherokee official within Cherokee Nation and UKB)

Time zones
- entire state (legally): UTC−06:00 (Central)
  - Summer (DST): UTC−05:00 (CDT)
- Kenton (informally): UTC−07:00 (Mountain)
  - Summer (DST): UTC−06:00 (MDT)
- USPS abbreviation: OK
- ISO 3166 code: US-OK
- Traditional abbreviation: Okla.
- Latitude: 33°37' N to 37° N
- Longitude: 94° 26' W to 103° W (35°N 98°W)
- Website: oklahoma.gov

State symbols of Oklahoma
List of state symbols
- Flag of Oklahoma

- Seal of Oklahoma

Living insignia
- Amphibian: Bullfrog
- Bird: Scissor-tailed Flycatcher
- Fish: Sand bass
- Flower: Oklahoma Rose; Wildflower: Indian Blanket
- Grass: Indian Grass
- Insect: European honey bee
- Mammal: American bison
- Reptile: Mountain Boomer
- Tree: Redbud

Inanimate insignia
- Beverage: Milk
- Color(s): Green and white
- Dance: Waltz: "Oklahoma Wind"
- Dinosaur: Acrocanthosaurus atokensis
- Folk dance: Square dance
- Fossil: Saurophaganax maximus
- Instrument: Drum
- Rock: Rose Rock
- Soil: Port Silt Loam
- Tartan: Oklahoma Tartan

State route marker

State quarter
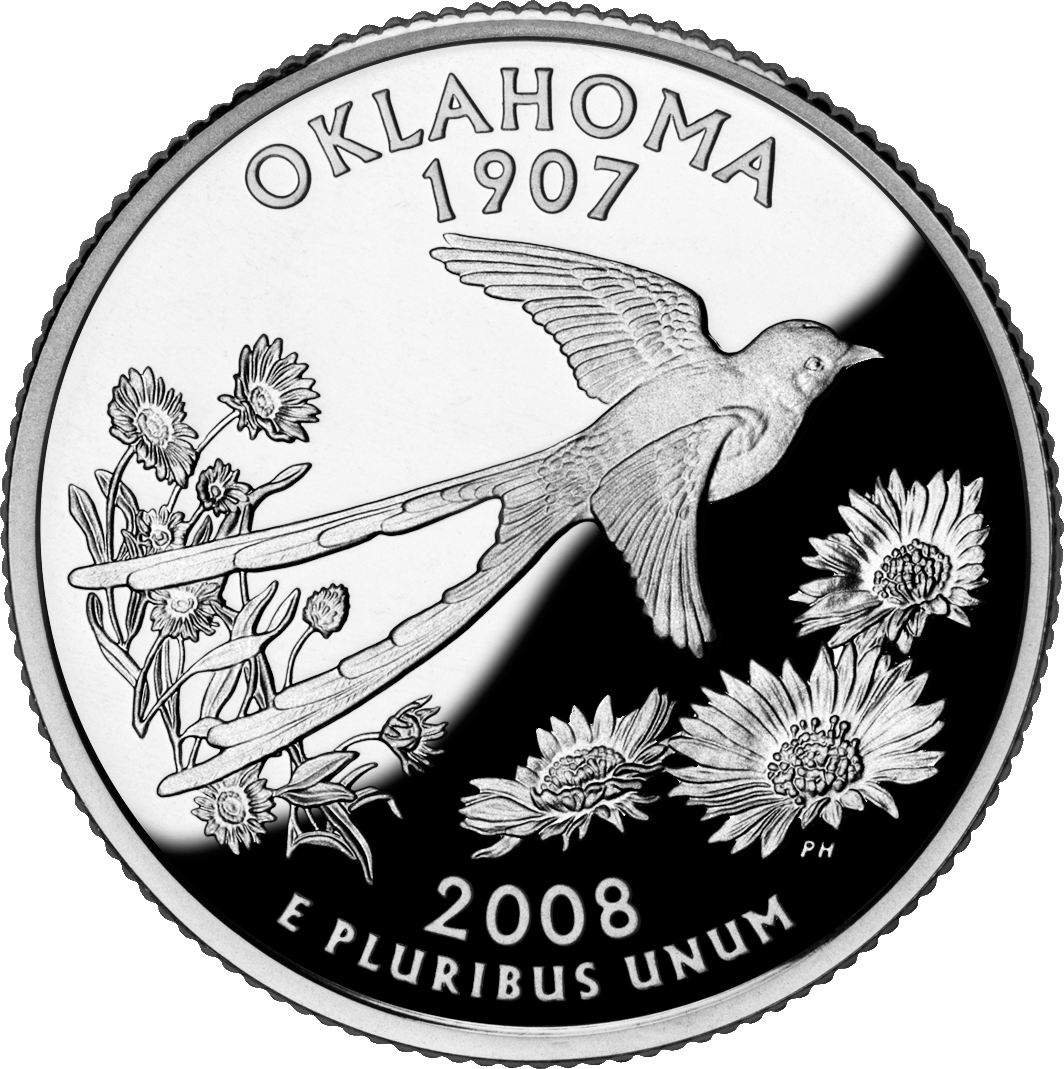
- Released in 2008, as part of the state quarters series. Oklahoma's state bird flying above its state wildflower.

Oklahoma (/ˌoʊkləˈhoʊmə/ OH-klə-HOH-mə; Choctaw: Oklahumma, pronounced [oklahómma]), is a landlocked state in the South Central, Southern, and Southwestern regions of the United States. It borders Texas to the southwest, Kansas to the north, Missouri to the northeast, Arkansas to the southeast, New Mexico to the west, and Colorado to the northwest. Partially in the western extreme of the Upland South, it is the 20th-most extensive and the 28th-most populous of the 50 United States. Its residents are known as Oklahomans, and its capital and largest city is Oklahoma City.

The state's name is derived from the Choctaw words okla, 'people' and humma, which translates as 'red'. Oklahoma is also known informally by its nickname, "The Sooner State", in reference to the Sooners, American settlers who staked their claims in formerly American Indian-owned lands until the Indian Appropriations Act of 1889 authorized the Land Rush of 1889 opening the land to settlement.

With ancient mountain ranges, prairie, mesas, and eastern forests, most of Oklahoma lies in the Great Plains, Cross Timbers, and the U.S. Interior Highlands, all regions prone to severe weather. Oklahoma is at a confluence of three major American cultural regions. Historically, it served as a government-sanctioned territory for American Indians moved from east of the Mississippi River, a route for cattle drives from Texas and related regions, and a destination for Southern settlers. There are currently 25 Indigenous languages spoken in Oklahoma. According to the 2020 U.S. census, 14.2 percent of Oklahomans identify as American Indians, the highest Indigenous population by percentage out of any state.

A major producer of natural gas, oil, and agricultural products, Oklahoma relies on an economic base of aviation, energy, telecommunications, and biotechnology. Oklahoma City and Tulsa serve as Oklahoma's primary economic anchors, with nearly two-thirds of Oklahomans living within their metropolitan statistical areas.

== Etymology ==
The name Oklahoma comes from the Choctaw language phrase okla, 'people', and humma, translated as 'red'. Choctaw Nation Chief Allen Wright suggested the name in 1865 during treaty negotiations with the federal US government on the use of Indian Territory. He envisioned an all exclusive American Indian state controlled by the United States bureau of Indian Affairs. A painting of the 1865 Council now hangs in the Oklahoma Senate. Oklahoma later became the de facto name for Oklahoma Territory, and it was officially approved in 1890, two years after that area was opened to American settlers.

== History ==
=== Pre-Columbian ===
Indigenous peoples were present in what is now Oklahoma by the last ice age. Ancestors of the Wichita and Affiliated Tribes (including Teyas and Escanjaques and Tawakoni), Tonkawa, and Caddo (including Kichai) lived in what is now Oklahoma. Southern Plains villagers lived in the central and west of the state, with a subgroup, the Panhandle culture people, living in the panhandle region. Caddoan Mississippian culture peoples lived in the eastern part of the state. Spiro Mounds, in what is now Spiro, Oklahoma, was a major Mississippian mound complex that flourished between AD 850 and 1450. Plains Apache people settled in the Southern Plains and in Oklahoma between 1300 and 1500.

=== European exploration and colonization ===
The expedition of Spaniard Francisco Vázquez de Coronado traveled through the area in 1541, but French explorers claimed the area in the early 18th century. By the 18th century, Comanche and Kiowa entered the region from the west and Quapaw and Osage peoples moved into what is now eastern Oklahoma. French colonists claimed the region until 1803, when all the French territory west of the Mississippi River was acquired by the United States in the Louisiana Purchase. The territory was a part of the Arkansas Territory from 1819 until 1828.

=== 19th century ===
During the 19th century, the U.S. federal government forcibly removed tens of thousands of American Indians from their ancestral homelands from across North America and transported them to the area including and surrounding present-day Oklahoma. The Choctaw was the first of the Five Civilized Tribes to be removed from the Southeastern United States. The phrase "Trail of Tears" originated from a description of the removal of the Choctaw Nation in 1831, although the term is usually used for the Cherokee removal.

Seventeen thousand Cherokees and 2,000 of their black slaves were deported. The area, already occupied by Osage and Quapaw tribes, was called for the Choctaw Nation until revised Native American and then later American policy redefined the boundaries to include other Native Americans. By 1890, more than 30 Native American nations and tribes had been concentrated on land within Indian Territory or "Indian Country".

All Five Civilized Tribes signed treaties with the Confederate military during the American Civil War. The Cherokee Nation had an internal civil war. Slavery in Indian Territory was not abolished until 1866.

Between 1866 and 1899, cattle ranches in Texas strove to meet the demands for food in eastern cities and railroads in Kansas promised to deliver in a timely manner. Cattle trails and cattle ranches developed as cowboys either drove their product north or settled illegally in Indian Territory. In 1881, four of the five major cattle trails on the western frontier traveled through Indian Territory.

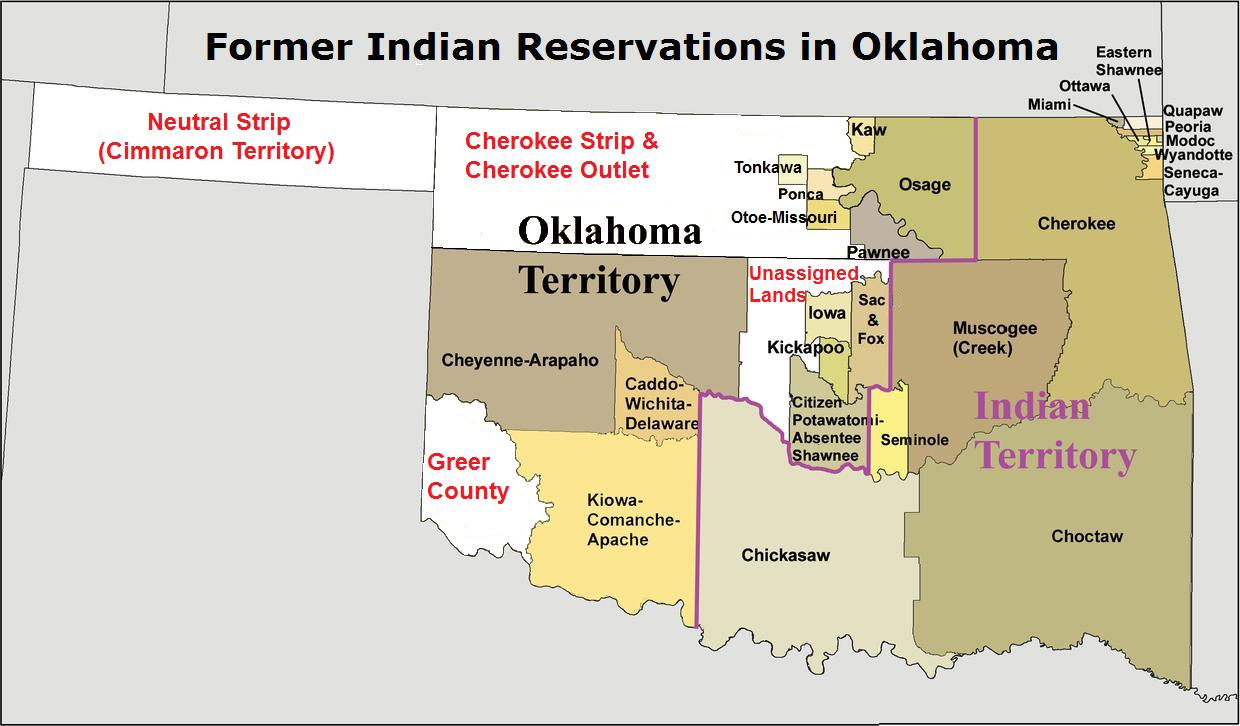
Indian reservations in Oklahoma before the Dawes Act of 1887.

As white settlers arrived in Indian Territory and demanded land owned and guaranteed to Indian tribes by treaties, the U.S. government responded by enacting the Dawes Act in 1887 and the Curtis Act of 1898. The acts abolished tribal governments, eliminated tribal ownership of land, and allotted 160 acres (65 ha) of land to each head of an Indian family. An objective of the acts was the forced assimilation of Indians into white society. Land not allotted to individual Indians was owned by the U.S. government and sold or distributed to settlers and railroads. The proceeds of the land sales were used to educate Indian children and advance the policy of assimilation. As a result of the two acts, about one-half of the land previously owned by Indian tribes was owned by whites by 1900. Moreover, much of the land allotted to individual Indian heads of families became white-owned. Allottees often sold or were fraudulently deprived of their land.

The acquisition of tribal lands by the U.S. government led to land runs, also called land rushes, from 1887 and 1895. Major land runs, including the Land Rush of 1889, opened up millions of acres of formerly tribal lands to white settlement. The rushes began at precise times as each prospective settler literally raced with other prospective settlers to claim ownership of 160 acres (65 ha) of land under the Homestead Act of 1862. Land was typically claimed by settlers on a first-come, first-served basis. Those who broke the rules by crossing the border into the territory before the official opening time were said to have been crossing the border sooner, leading to the term sooners, which eventually became the state's official nickname. George Washington Steele was appointed the first governor of the territory of Oklahoma in 1890.

=== 20th century ===
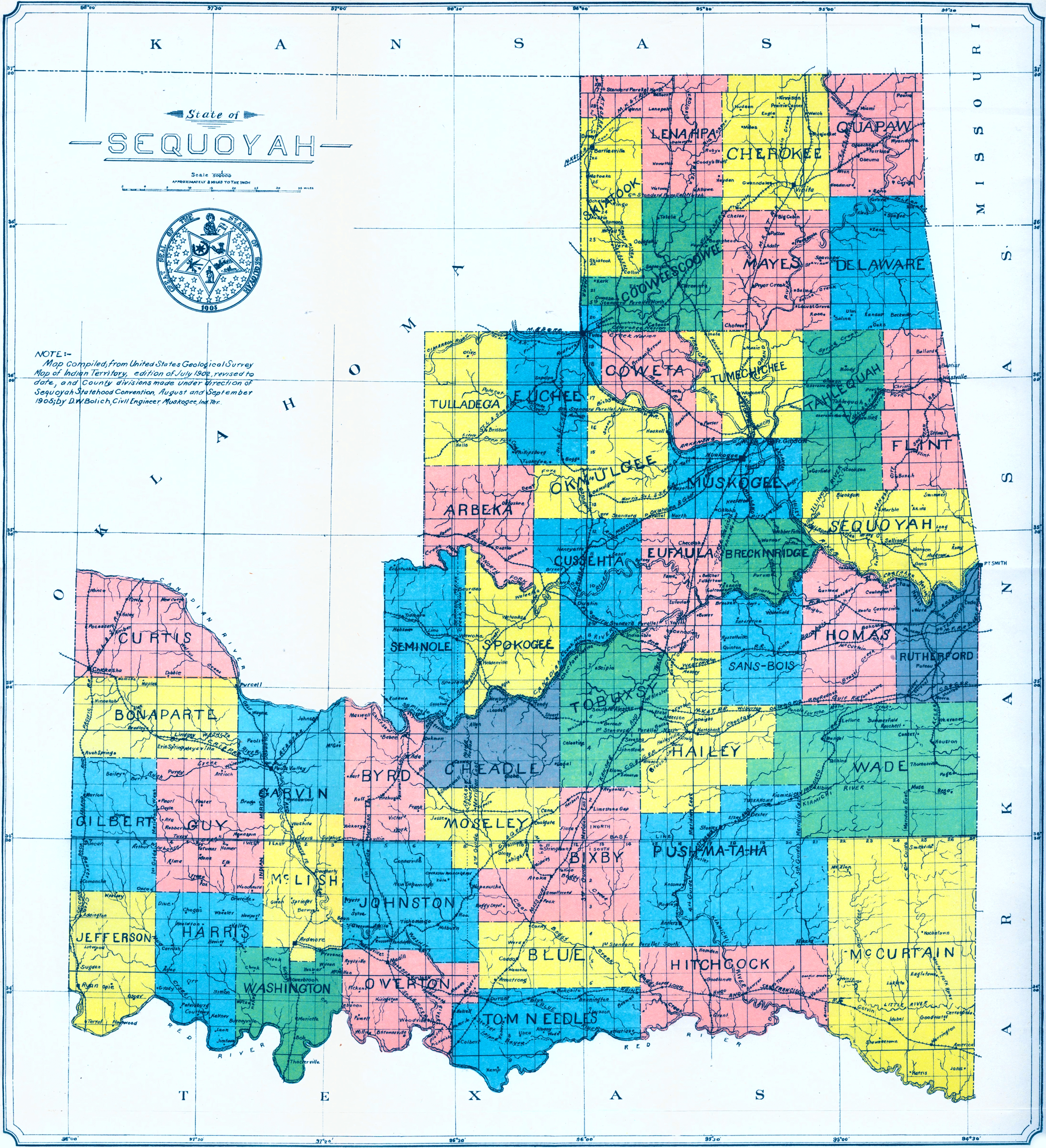
A proposed map of the 'State of Sequoyah' compiled from the USGS Map of Indian Territory (1902)

Attempts to create an all-Indian state named Oklahoma and a later attempt to create an all-Indian state named Sequoyah failed, but the Sequoyah Statehood Convention of 1905 eventually laid the groundwork for the Oklahoma Statehood Convention, which took place two years later. On June 16, 1906, Congress enacted a statute authorizing the people of the Oklahoma and Indian Territories, as well as Arizona and New Mexico, to form a constitution and state government in order to be admitted as a state. On November 16, 1907, President Theodore Roosevelt issued Presidential Proclamation no. 780, establishing Oklahoma as the 46th state in the Union.

The new state became a focal point for the emerging oil industry, as discoveries of oil pools prompted towns to grow rapidly in population and wealth. Tulsa eventually became known as the "Oil Capital of the World" for most of the 20th century and oil investments fueled much of the state's early economy. In 1927, Oklahoman businessman Cyrus Avery, known as the "Father of Route 66", began the campaign to create U.S. Route 66. Using a stretch of highway from Amarillo, Texas to Tulsa, Oklahoma to form the original portion of Highway 66, Avery spearheaded the creation of the U.S. Highway 66 Association to oversee the planning of Route 66, based in his hometown of Tulsa.

In late September 1918, the first cases of the Spanish flu appeared in Oklahoma. Although public health authorities statewide had some early indication that the disease being reported on the East coast had traveled westward, the turmoil caused by the rapid increase in cases in Oklahoma quickly overwhelmed both health workers and local governing bodies. In Oklahoma City, shortages of both supplies and personnel were mitigated, in part, by the mobilization of the American Red Cross. Rough estimates based on contemporary reports indicate that approximately 100,000 people fell ill with the disease before the pandemic ebbed in 1919. Of those 100,000 cases, it is estimated that around 7,500 proved fatal, placing total mortality rates for the state at roughly 7.5%.

Oklahoma also has a rich African-American history. Many Black towns, founded by the Freedmen of the Five Tribes during Reconstruction, thrived in the early 20th century with the arrival of Black Exodusters who migrated from neighboring states, especially Kansas. The politician Edward P. McCabe encouraged Black settlers to come to what was then Indian Territory. McCabe discussed with President Theodore Roosevelt the possibility of making Oklahoma a majority-Black state.

By the early 20th century, the Greenwood district of Tulsa was one of the most prosperous African-American communities in the United States. Jim Crow laws had established racial segregation since before the start of the 20th century, but Tulsa's Black residents had created a thriving area.

Social tensions were exacerbated by the revival of the Ku Klux Klan after 1915. The Tulsa race massacre occurred in 1921, with White mobs attacking Black people and carrying out a pogrom in Greenwood. In one of the costliest episodes of racist violence in American history, sixteen hours of rioting resulted in the destruction of 35 city blocks, $1.8 million in property damage, and an estimated death toll of between 75 and 300 people. By the late 1920s, the Ku Klux Klan had declined to negligible influence within the state.

During the 1930s, parts of the state began to suffer from the consequences of poor farming practices. This period was known as the Dust Bowl, throughout which areas of Kansas, Texas, New Mexico, and northwestern Oklahoma were hampered by long periods of little rainfall, strong winds, abnormally high temperatures, and most notably, severe dust storms sending thousands of farmers into poverty and forcing them to relocate to more fertile areas of the western United States. Over a twenty-year period ending in 1950, the state saw its only historical decline in population, dropping 6.9 percent as impoverished families migrated out of the state after the Dust Bowl.

Soil and water conservation projects markedly changed practices in the state, leading to the construction of massive flood control systems and dams to supply water for domestic needs and agricultural irrigation. As of 2024, Oklahoma had more than 4,700 dams, about 20% of all dams in the U.S.

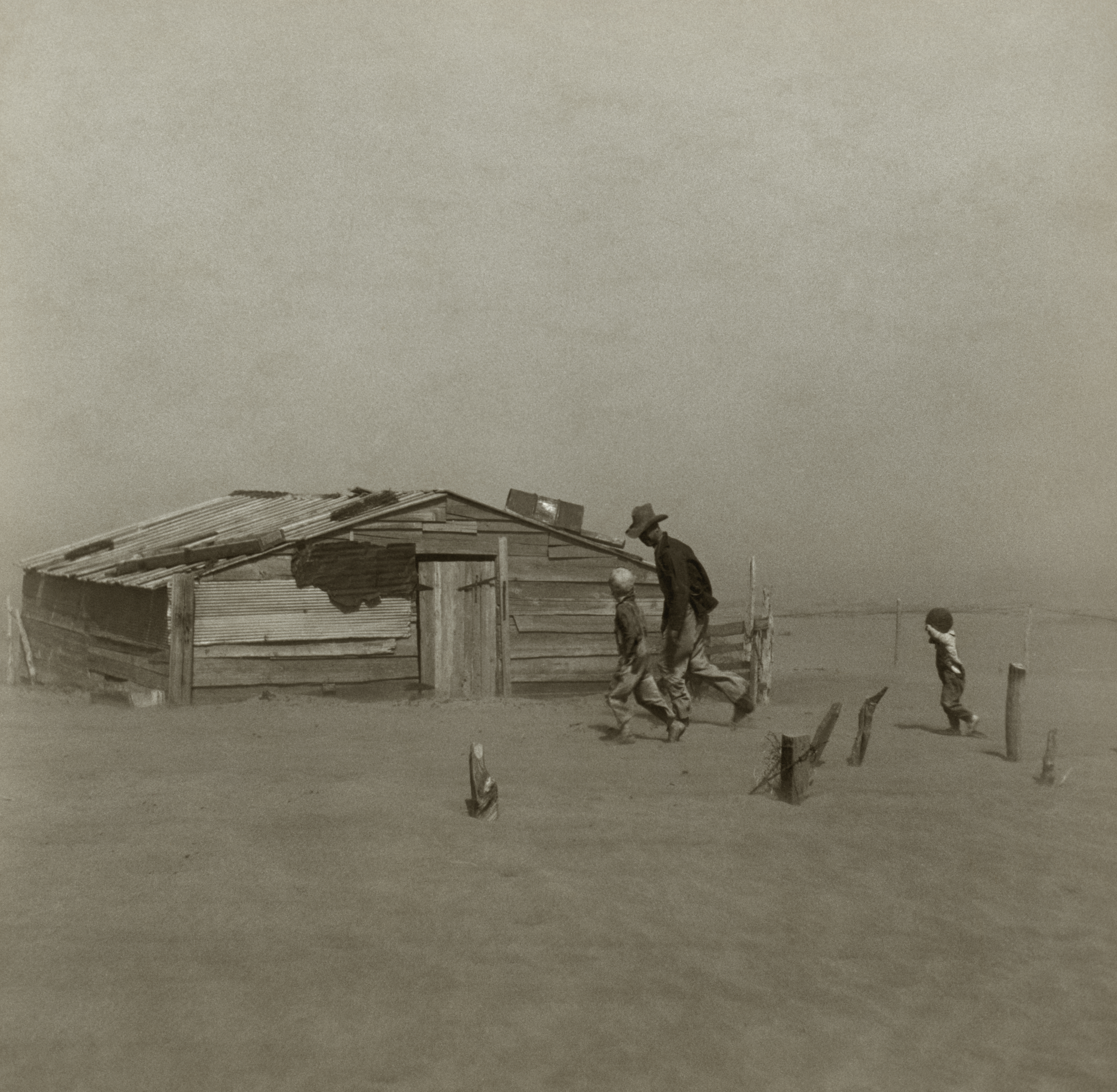
The Dust Bowl sent thousands of farmers into poverty during the 1930s.

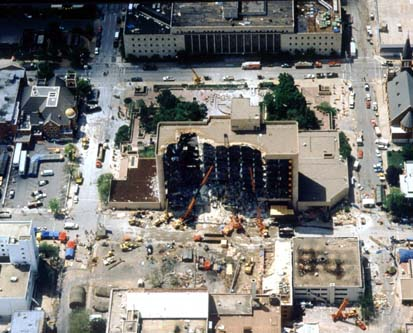
The bombing of the Alfred P. Murrah Federal Building in Oklahoma City was one of the deadliest acts of terrorism in American history.

In 1995, Oklahoma City was the site of the most destructive act of domestic terrorism in American history. The Oklahoma City bombing of April 19, 1995, in which Timothy McVeigh detonated a large, crude explosive device outside the Alfred P. Murrah Federal Building, killed 168 people, including 19 children. For his crime, McVeigh was executed by the federal government on June 11, 2001. His accomplice, Terry Nichols, is serving life in prison without parole for helping plan the attack and prepare the explosive.

=== 21st century ===
On May 31, 2016, several cities experienced record setting flooding.

The former reservations of the Five Civilized Tribes in dispute in McGirt v. Oklahoma

On July 9, 2020, the Supreme Court of the United States determined in McGirt v. Oklahoma that the reservations of the Five Tribes, comprising much of Eastern Oklahoma, were never disestablished by Congress and thus are still "Indian Country" for the purposes of criminal law.

Later decisions by the Oklahoma Court of Criminal Appeals also found the Quapaw Nation, Ottawa Tribe, Peoria Tribe, and Miami Tribe also had existing reservations. The Osage Nation is awaiting for a possible appellate decision after a district judge had ruled that the Osage reservation was disestablished.

== Geography ==
Köppen climate types of Oklahoma

Oklahoma is the 20th-largest state in the United States, covering an area of 69,895 square miles (181,030 km^{2}), with 68,591 square miles (177,650 km^{2}) of land, and 1,304 square miles (3,380 km^{2}) of water. It lies partly in the Great Plains near the geographical center of the 48 contiguous states. It is bordered on the east by Arkansas and Missouri, on the north by Kansas, on the northwest by Colorado, on the far west by New Mexico, and on the south and near-west by Texas.

=== Borders ===
Oklahoma's border with Kansas was defined as the 37th Parallel in the 1854 Kansas-Nebraska Act. This was disputed with the Cherokee and Osage Nations, which claimed their border extended north of this line and could not be part of the Kansas Territory. This was resolved in 1870 with the Drum Creek Treaty, which reestablished Kansas's southern border as the 37th parallel. This also applied to the then No-Man's Land that became the Oklahoma Panhandle.

The Oklahoma-Texas border consists of the Red River of the South in the south and the 100th meridian west as the western border between Oklahoma and the Texas Panhandle. These were first established in the 1819 Adams–Onís Treaty between the United States and Spain.

The Oklahoma panhandle was originally part of the Panhandle of the Republic of Texas, but when Texas joined the Union as a slave state, it could not retain any lands north of 36 degrees 30 minutes, as specified in the Missouri Compromise. The Panhandle existed as a no-man's land until 1907 when Oklahoma acquired the territory upon gaining statehood.

Oklahoma's Eastern border is divided between Missouri and Arkansas. The Missouri-Oklahoma border is defined as the Meridian passing through the Kawsmouth, where the Kansas River meets the Missouri River. This is the same Meridian as the Kansas-Missouri border.

The Oklahoma-Arkansas border was originally defined by two lines: the borders between Arkansas and the Cherokee and Choctaw Reservations. This formed two diagonal lines meeting at the western edge of Fort Smith Arkansas, with one line running northeast from the Red River and the other running southeast from the Oklahoma-Arkansas-Missouri border. The Choctaw-Arkansas border was established in the 1820 Treaty of Doak's Sand, and later refined in the 1830 Treaty of Dancing Rabbit Creek. These treaties left a 57-acre exclave of the Choctaw reservation bounded by Arkansas, the Arkansas River and the Poteau River. This became the site of a smuggling camp called "Coke Hill", noted mostly for its importance in cocaine smuggling.

After petitioning Congress to hand over jurisdiction, the 57 acres was given to Arkansas in 1905. The 1985 US Supreme Court Case Oklahoma v. Arkansas decided the land would remain Arkansas, even though the Choctaw had not been notified or asked about the territory being handed over. Therefore, the Poteau River serves as the Oklahoma-Arkansas boundary for approximately 1 mile, reducing the Choctaw Reservation and later Oklahoma by 57 acres as established in the treaties of the early 1800s.

=== Topography ===
Oklahoma is between the Great Plains and the Ozark Plateau in the Gulf of Mexico watershed, generally sloping from the high plains of its western boundary to the low wetlands of its southeastern boundary. Its highest and lowest points follow this trend, with its highest peak, Black Mesa, at 4,973 feet (1,516 m) above sea level, situated near its far northwest corner in the Oklahoma Panhandle. The state's lowest point is on the Little River near its far southeastern boundary near the town of Idabel, which dips to 289 feet (88 m) above sea level.

Among the most geographically diverse states, Oklahoma is one of four to harbor more than 10 distinct ecological regions, with 11 in its borders—more per square mile than in any other state. Its western and eastern halves, however, are marked by extreme differences in geographical diversity: Eastern Oklahoma touches eight ecological regions and its western half contains three. Although having fewer ecological regions Western Oklahoma contains many rare, relic species.

Oklahoma has four primary mountain ranges: the Ouachita Mountains, the Arbuckle Mountains, the Wichita Mountains, and the Ozark Mountains. Contained within the U.S. Interior Highlands region, the Ozark and Ouachita Mountains are the only major mountainous region between the Rocky Mountains and the Appalachians. A portion of the Flint Hills stretches into north-central Oklahoma, and near the state's eastern border, The Oklahoma Tourism & Recreation Department regards Cavanal Hill as the world's tallest hill; at 1,999 feet (609 m), it fails their definition of a mountain by one foot.

The semi-arid high plains in the state's northwestern corner harbor few natural forests; the region has a rolling to flat landscape with intermittent canyons and mesa ranges like the Glass Mountains. Partial plains interrupted by small, sky island mountain ranges like the Antelope Hills and the Wichita Mountains dot southwestern Oklahoma; transitional prairie and oak savannas cover the central portion of the state. The Ozark and Ouachita Mountains rise from west to east over the state's eastern third, gradually increasing in elevation in an eastward direction.

More than 500 named creeks and rivers make up Oklahoma's waterways, and with 200 lakes created by dams, it holds the nation's highest number of artificial reservoirs. Most of the state lies in two primary drainage basins belonging to the Red and Arkansas Rivers, though the Lee and Little Rivers also contain significant drainage basins.

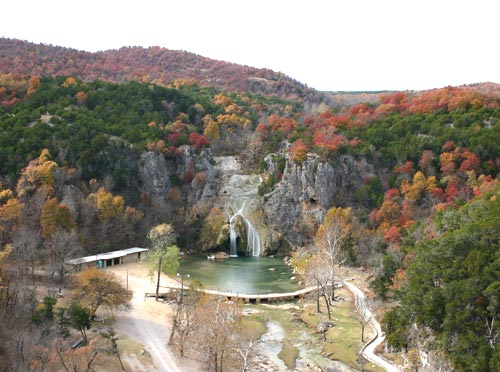
Turner Falls

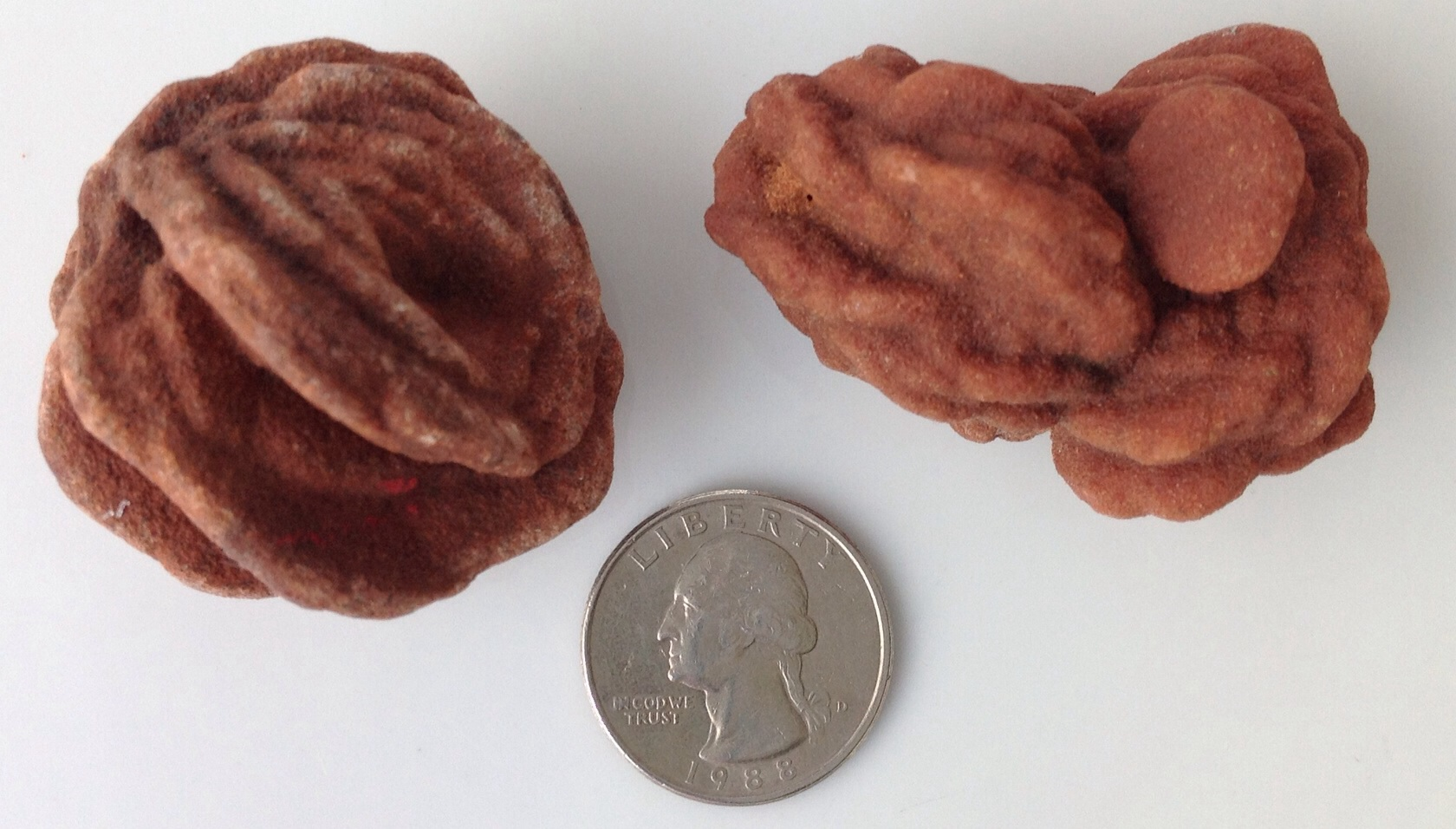
State rock (rose rock) specimens from Cleveland County

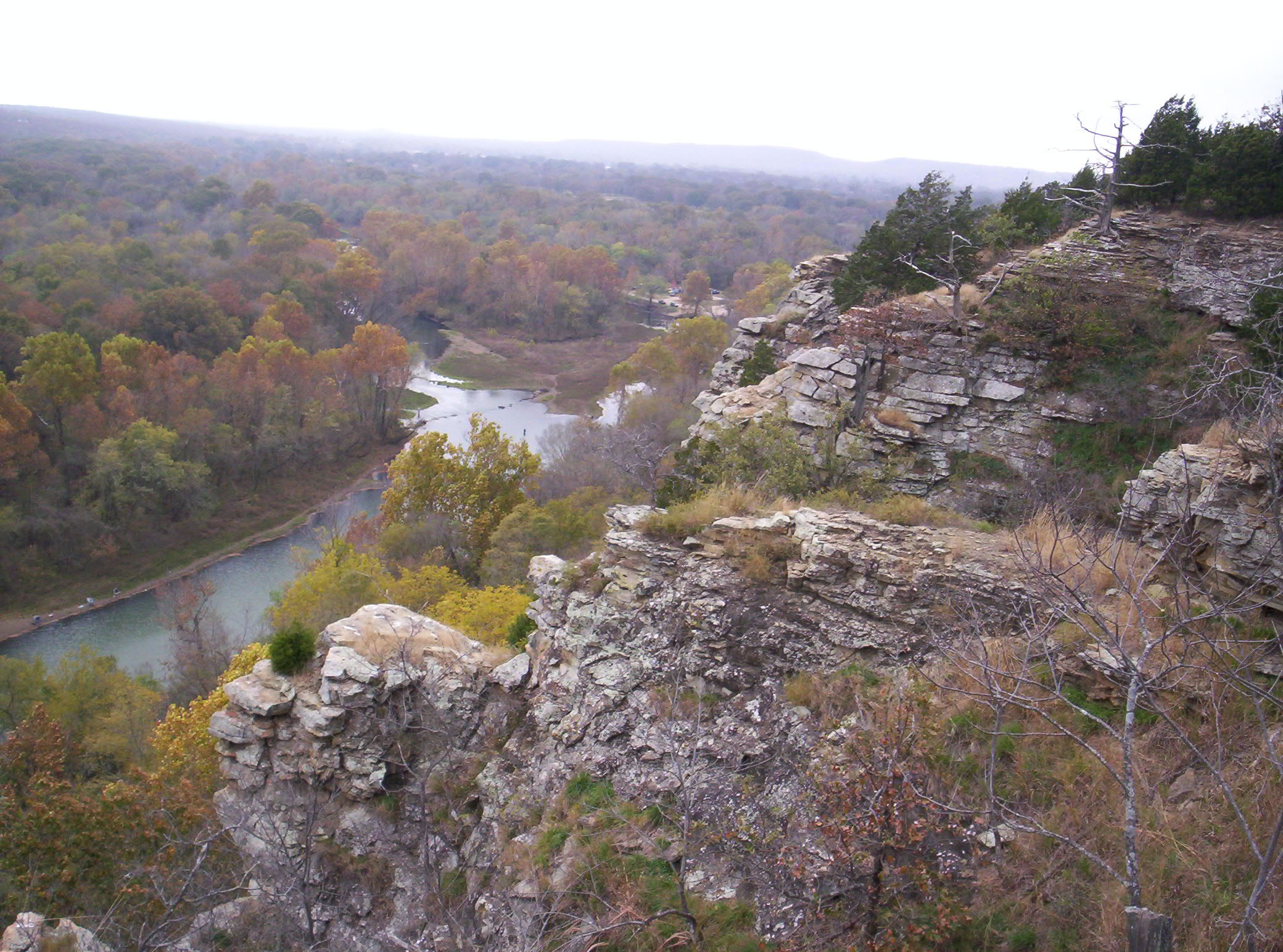
Illinois River in northeastern Oklahoma

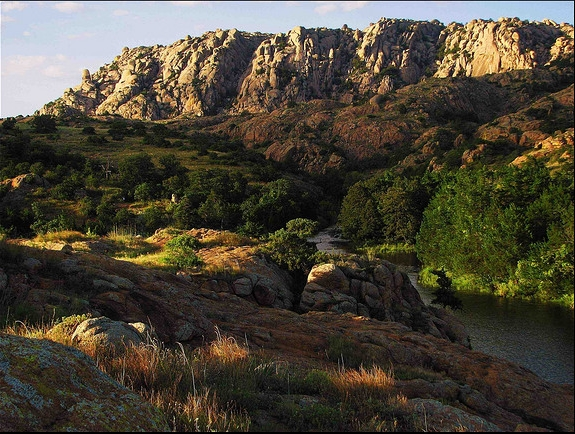
Elk Mountain, in the eastern Wichita Mountains, southwestern Oklahoma

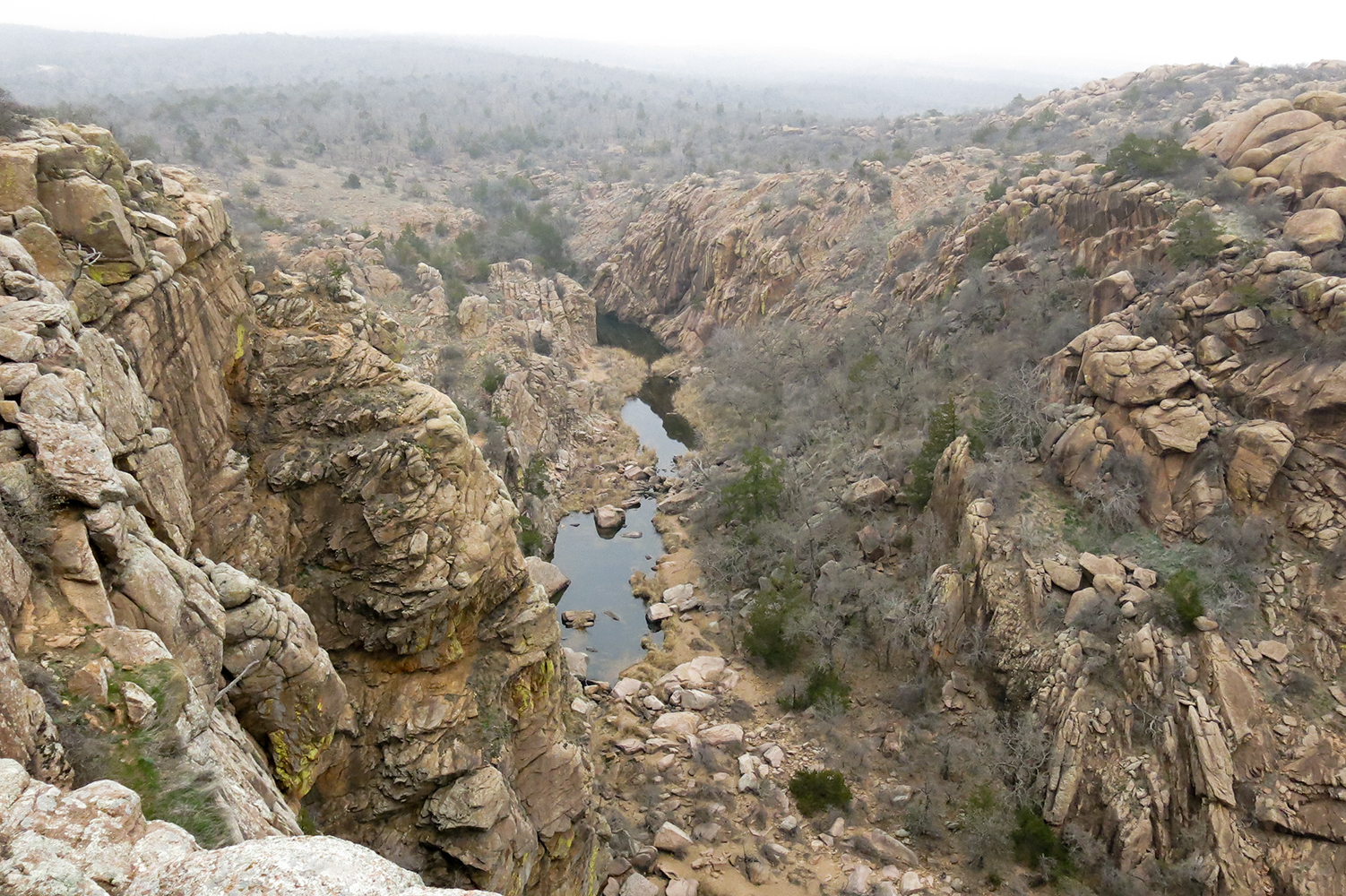
Wichita Mountains Narrows

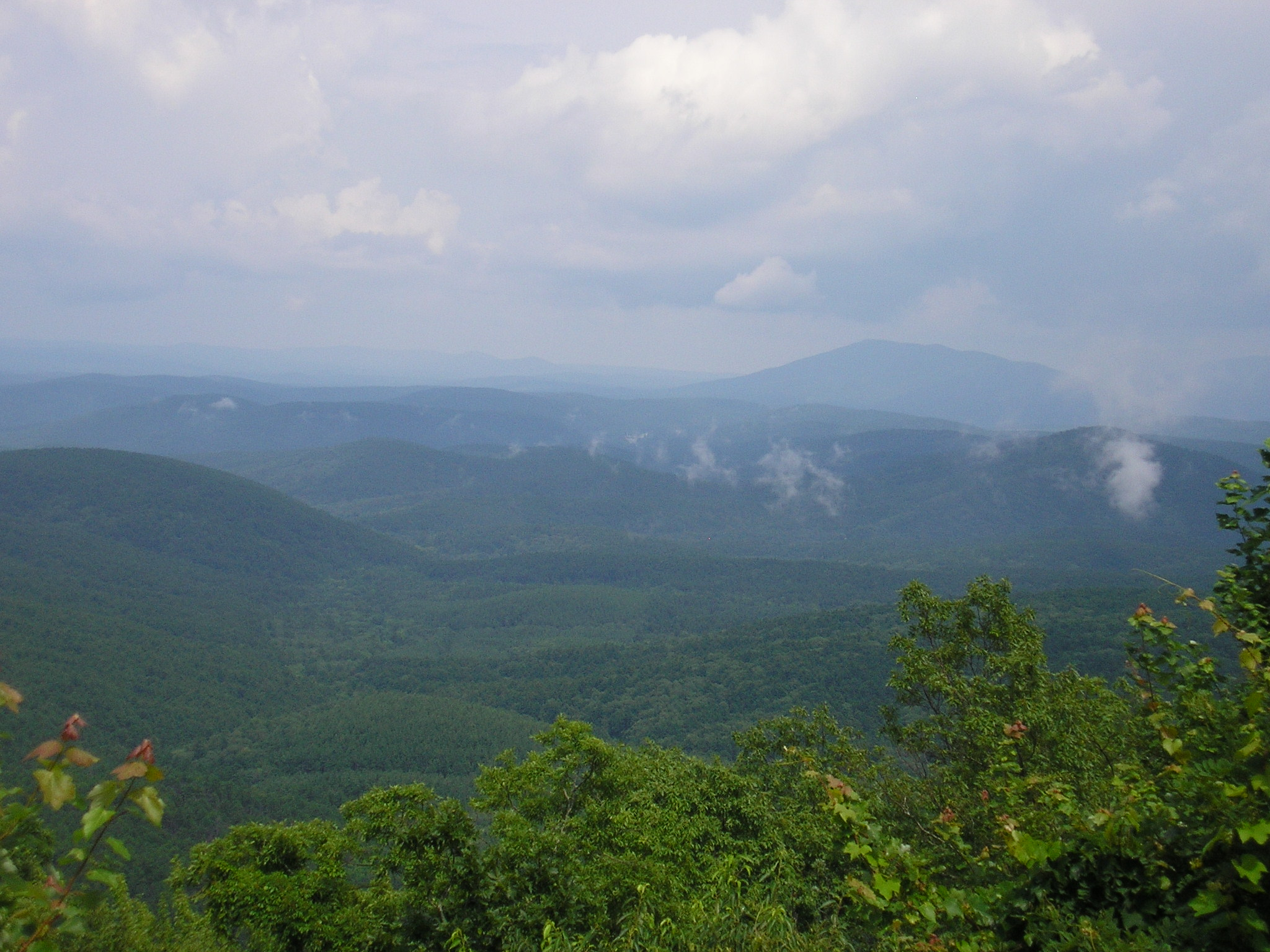
The Ouachita Mountains cover much of southeastern Oklahoma.

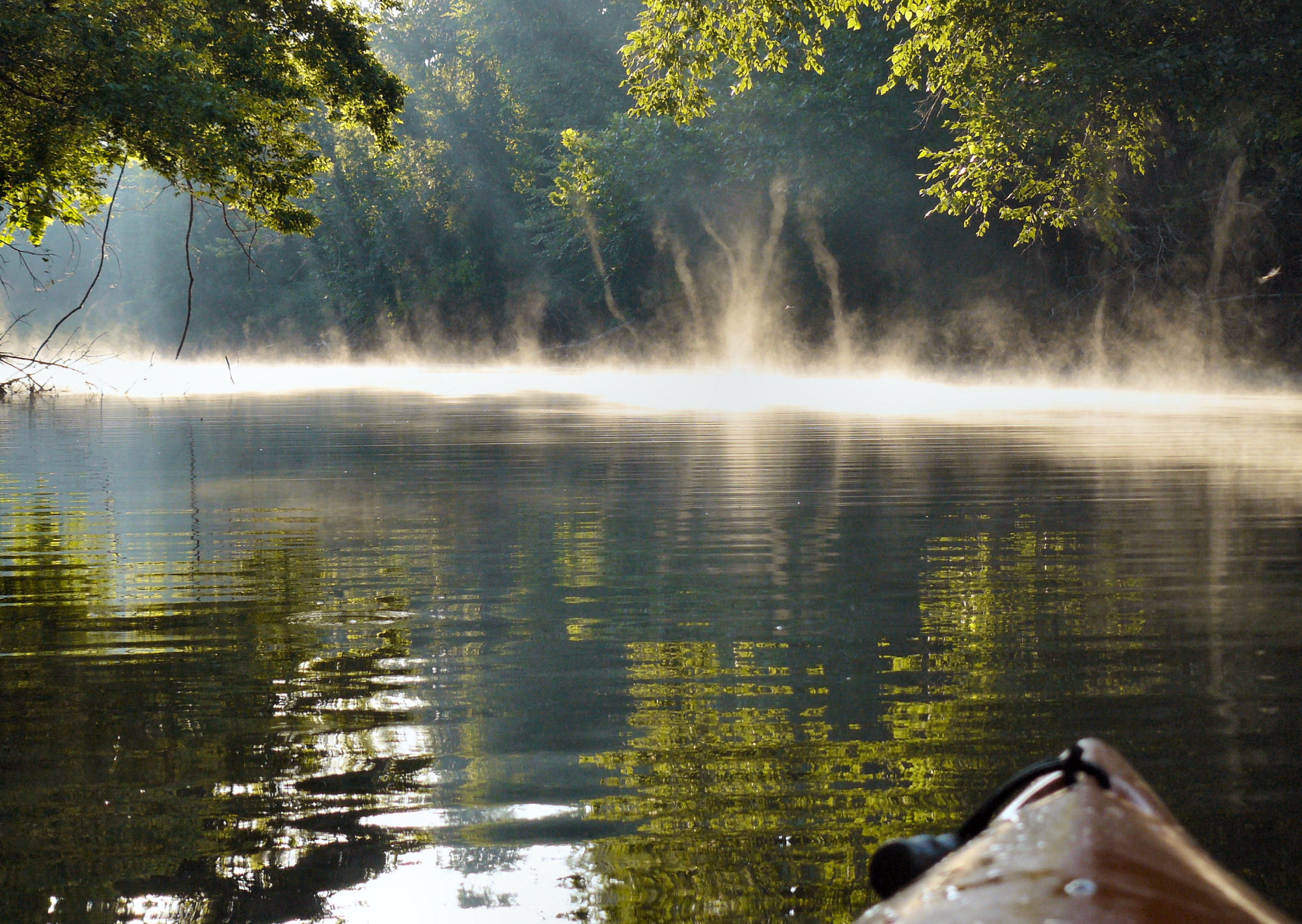
Grave Creek in McIntosh County

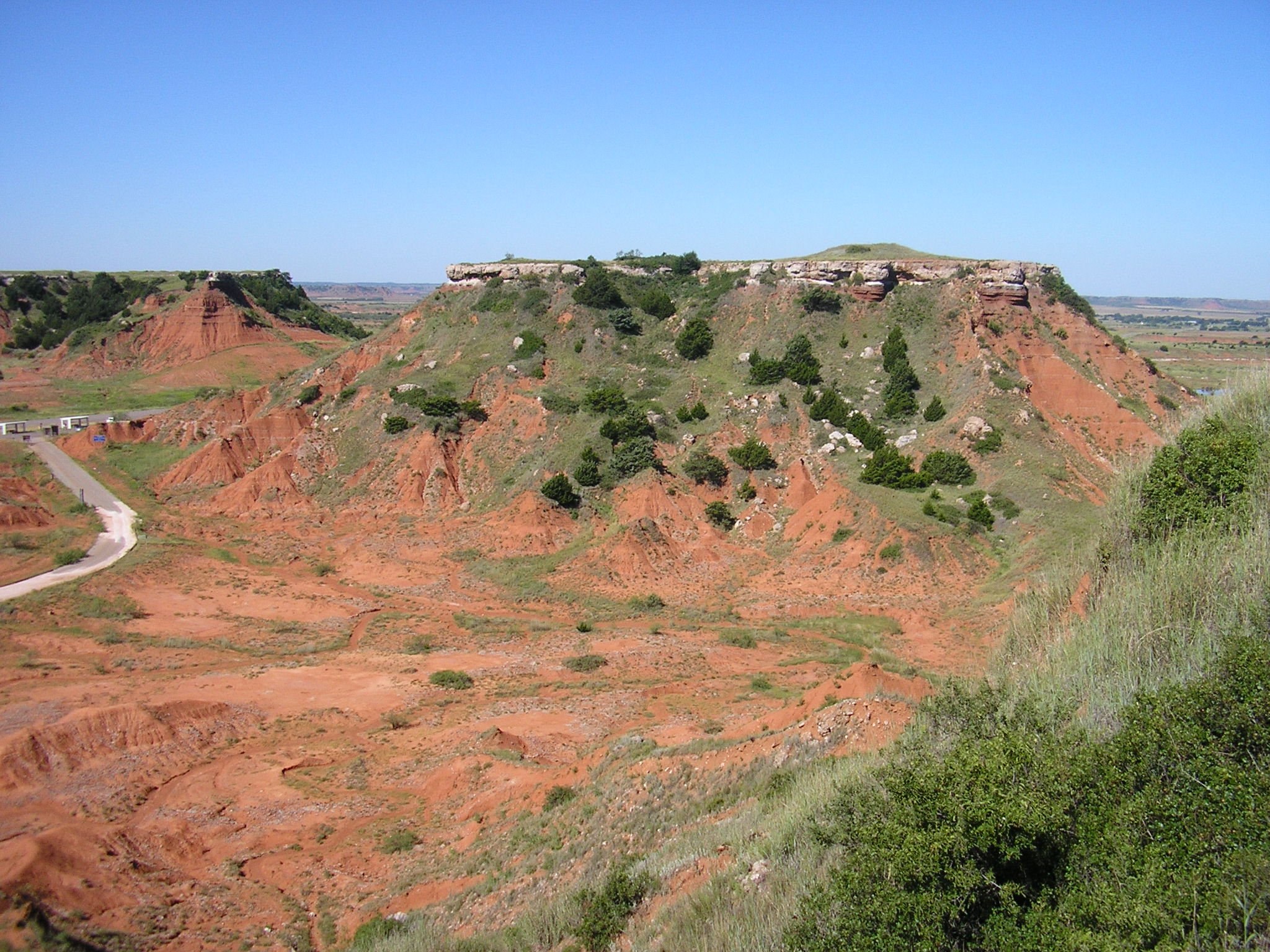
Mesas rise above one of Oklahoma's state parks.

=== Flora and fauna ===
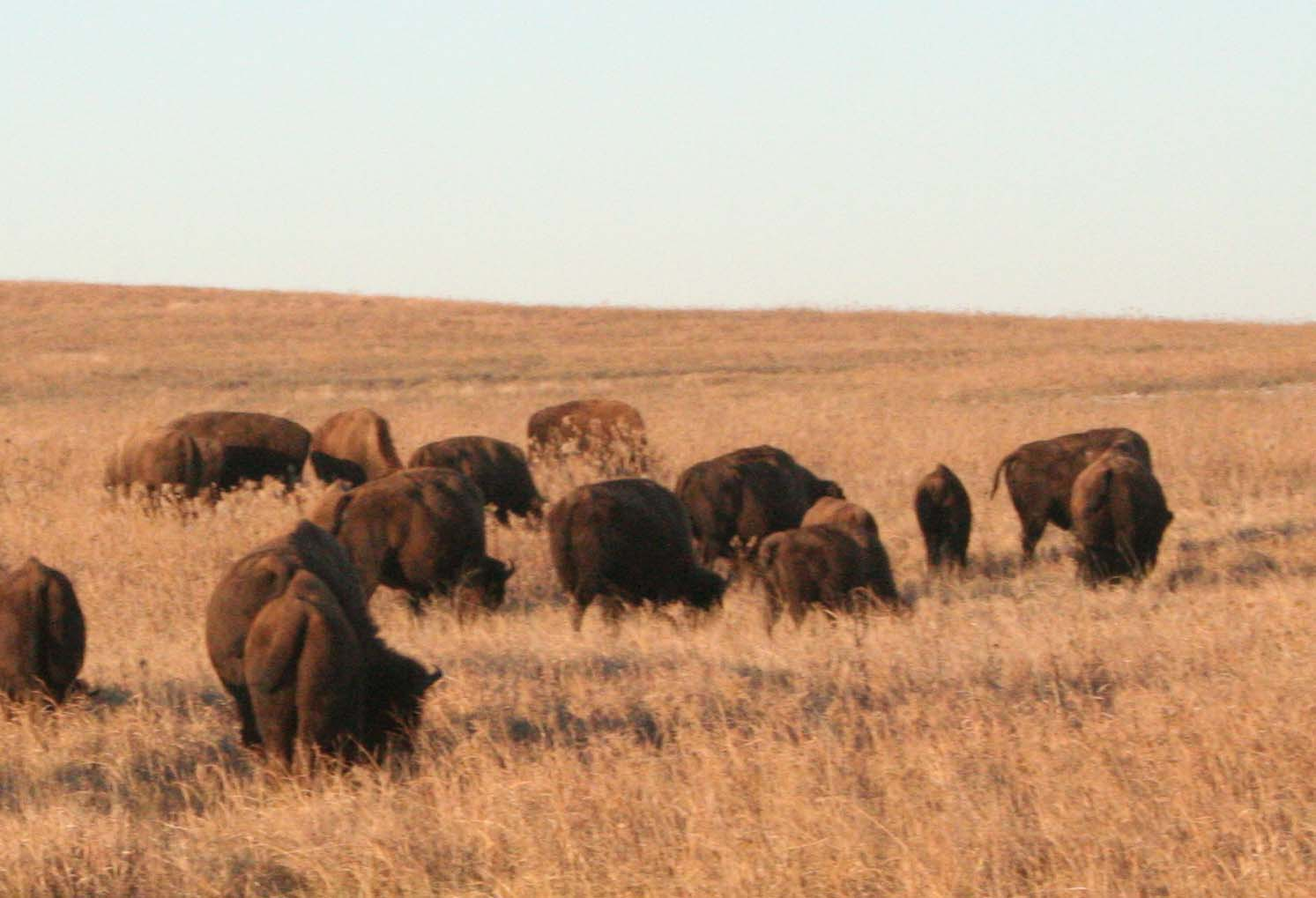
Populations of American bison inhabit Oklahoma's prairie ecosystems.

Due to Oklahoma's location at the confluence of many geographic regions, Oklahoma's climatic regions have a high rate of biodiversity. Forests cover 24 percent of Oklahoma and prairie grasslands composed of shortgrass, mixed-grass, and tallgrass prairie, harbor expansive ecosystems in the state's central and western portions, although cropland has largely replaced native grasses. Where rainfall is sparse in the state's western regions, shortgrass prairie and shrublands are the most prominent ecosystems, though pinyon pines, red cedar (junipers), and ponderosa pines grow near rivers and creek beds in the panhandle's far western reaches. Southwestern Oklahoma contains many rare, disjunct species, including sugar maple, bigtooth maple, nolina, and Texas live oak.

Marshlands, cypress forests, and mixtures of shortleaf pine, loblolly pine, blue palmetto, and deciduous forests dominate the state's southeastern quarter, while mixtures of largely post oak, elm, red cedar (Juniperus virginiana), and pine forests cover northeastern Oklahoma.

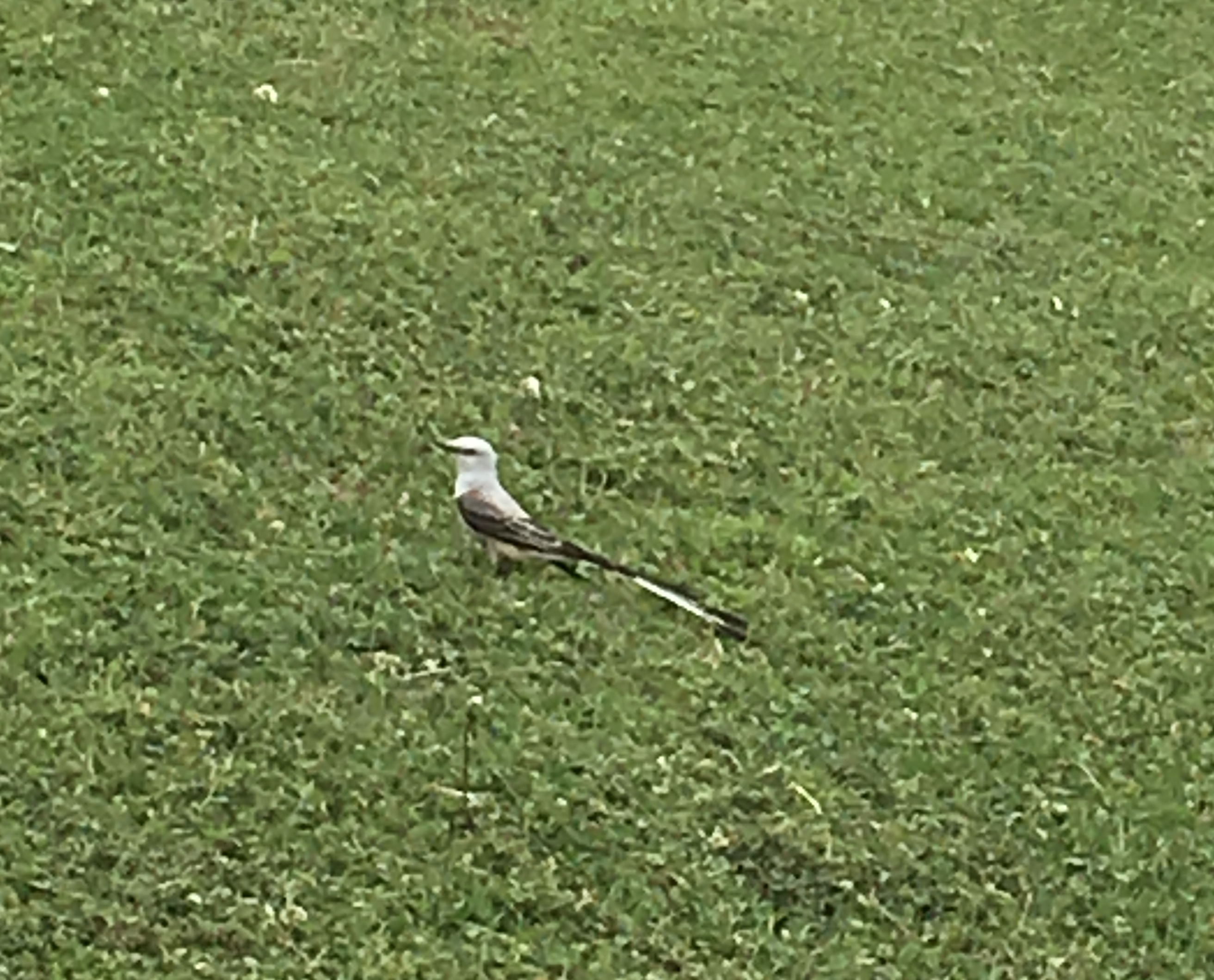
The scissor-tailed flycatcher (Tyrannus forficatus) is Oklahoma's State Bird

Oklahoma has populations of white-tailed deer, mule deer, antelope, coyotes, mountain lions, bobcats, elk, and birds such as quail, doves, cardinals, bald eagles, red-tailed hawks, and pheasants. In prairie ecosystems, American bison, greater prairie-chickens, badgers, and armadillo are common, and some of the nation's largest prairie dog towns inhabit shortgrass prairie in the state's panhandle. The Cross Timbers, a region transitioning from prairie to woodlands in Central Oklahoma, harbors 351 vertebrate species. The Ouachita Mountains are home to black bear, red fox, gray fox, and river otter populations, which coexist with 328 vertebrate species in southeastern Oklahoma. Also in southeastern Oklahoma lives the American alligator.

=== Protected lands ===
Oklahoma has fifty-one state parks, six national parks or protected regions, two national protected forests or grasslands, and a network of wildlife preserves and conservation areas. Six percent of the state's 10 million acres (40,000 km^{2}) of forest is public land, including the western portions of the Ouachita National Forest, the largest and oldest national forest in the Southern United States.

With 39,000 acres (160 km^{2}), the Tallgrass Prairie Preserve in north-central Oklahoma is the largest protected area of tallgrass prairie in the world and is part of an ecosystem that encompasses only ten percent of its former land area, once covering fourteen states. In addition, the Black Kettle National Grassland covers 31,300 acres (127 km^{2}) of prairie in southwestern Oklahoma. The Wichita Mountains Wildlife Refuge is the oldest and largest of nine National Wildlife Refuges in the state and was founded in 1901, encompassing 59,020 acres (238.8 km^{2}).

Of Oklahoma's federally protected parks or recreational sites, the Chickasaw National Recreation Area is the largest, with 9,898.63 acres (4,005.83 ha). Other sites include the Santa Fe and Trail of Tears national historic trails, the Fort Smith and Washita Battlefield national historic sites, and the Oklahoma City National Memorial.

=== Climate ===
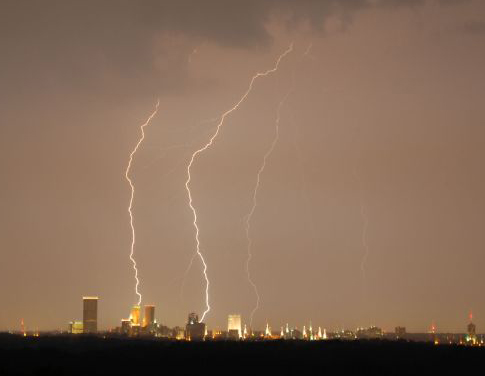
Oklahoma's climate is prime for the generation of thunderstorms.

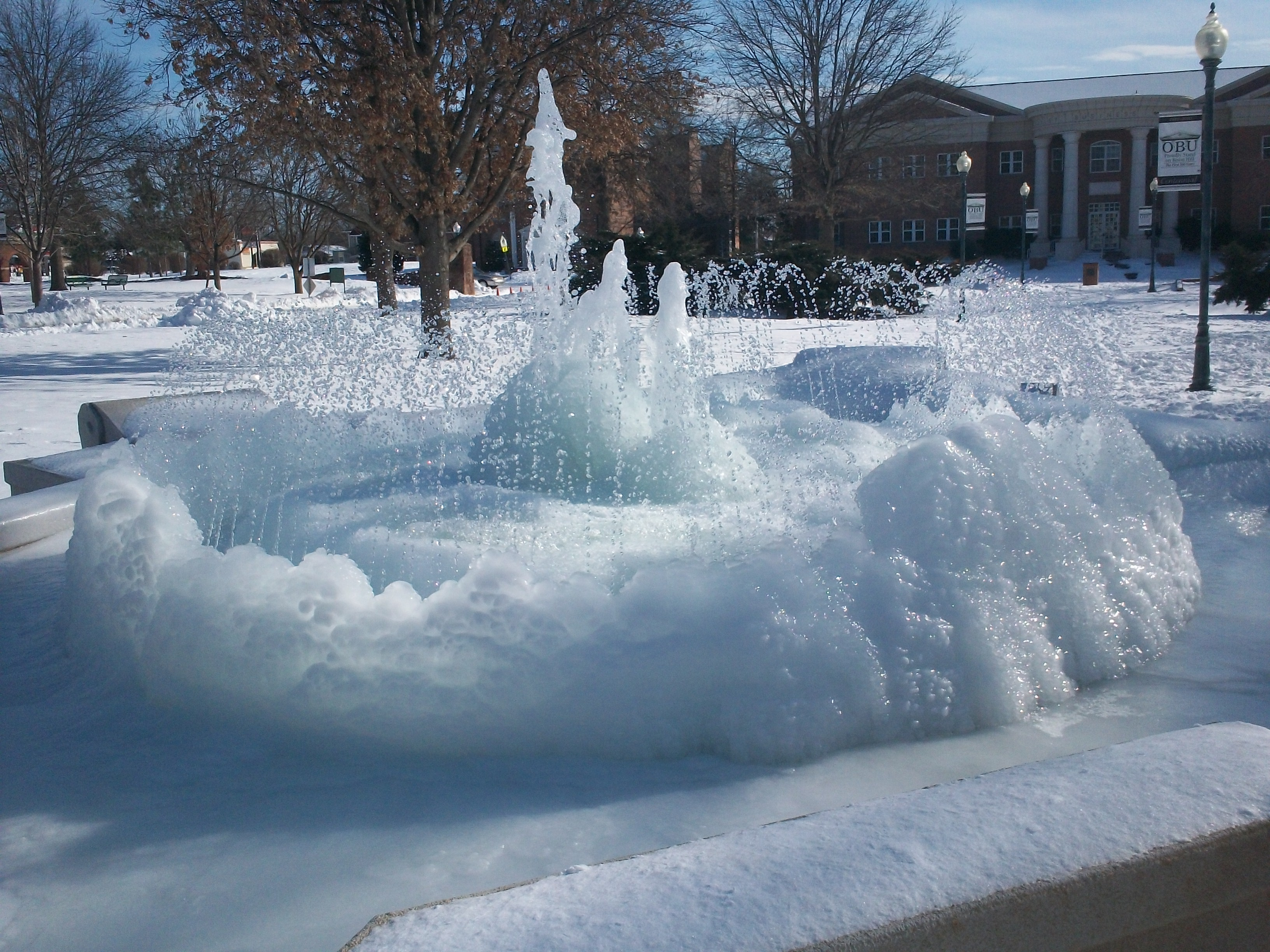
Winter at the Oklahoma Baptist University campus

Most of Oklahoma has a humid subtropical climate.

Oklahoma is in a humid subtropical region that lies in a transition zone between semiarid further to the west, humid continental to the north, and humid subtropical to the east and southeast. Most of Oklahoma lies in an area known as Tornado Alley characterized by frequent interaction between cold, dry air from Canada, warm to hot, dry air from Mexico and the Southwestern U.S., and warm, moist air from the Gulf of Mexico. The interactions between these three contrasting air currents produces severe weather (severe thunderstorms, damaging thunderstorm winds, large hail and tornadoes) with a frequency virtually unseen anywhere else on planet Earth. An average 62 tornadoes strike the state per year—one of the highest rates in the world.

Because of Oklahoma's position between zones of differing prevailing temperature and winds, weather patterns within the state can vary widely over relatively short distances, and they can change drastically in a short time. On November 11, 1911, the temperature at Oklahoma City reached 83 °F (28 °C) (the record high for that date), then a cold front of unprecedented intensity slammed across the state, causing the temperature to reach 17 °F (−8 °C) (the record low for that date) by midnight. This type of phenomenon is also responsible for many of the tornadoes in the area, such as the 1912 Oklahoma tornado outbreak when a warm front traveled along a stalled cold front, resulting in an average of about one tornado per hour.

The humid subtropical climate (Köppen Cfa) of central, southern, and eastern Oklahoma is influenced heavily by southerly winds bringing moisture from the Gulf of Mexico. Traveling westward, the climate transitions progressively toward a semiarid zone (Köppen BSk) in the high plains of the Panhandle and other western areas from about Lawton westward, less frequently touched by southern moisture. Precipitation and temperatures decline from east to west. Areas in the southeast average an annual temperature of 62 °F (17 °C) and an annual rainfall of generally over 40 in (1,020 mm) and up to 56 in (1,420 mm). Areas of the higher-elevation panhandle average 58 °F (14 °C), with annual rainfall under 17 in (430 mm).

Over almost all of Oklahoma, winter is the driest season. Average monthly precipitation increases dramatically in the spring, to a peak in May, the wettest month over most of the state, with its frequent and not uncommonly severe thunderstorm activity. Early June can still be wet, but most years see a marked decrease in rainfall during June and early July. Mid-summer (July and August) represents a secondary dry season over much of Oklahoma, with long stretches of hot weather with only sporadic thunderstorm activity not uncommon many years.

Severe drought is common in the hottest summers, such as those of 1934, 1954, 1980 and 2011, all of which featured weeks on end of virtual rainlessness and highs well over 100 °F (38 °C). Average precipitation rises again from September to mid-October, representing a secondary wetter season, then declines from late October through December.

The entire state frequently experiences temperatures above 100 °F (38 °C) or below 0 °F (−18 °C), though below-zero temperatures are rare in south-central and southeastern Oklahoma. Snowfall ranges from an average of less than 4 in (102 mm) in the south to just over 20 in (508 mm) on the border of Colorado in the panhandle. Oklahoma is home to the Storm Prediction Center, the National Severe Storms Laboratory, the Warning Decision Training Division, and the Radar Operations Center, all part of the National Weather Service and in Norman.

Monthly temperatures for Oklahoma's largest cities
City		Jan	Feb	March	April	May	June	July	Aug	Sept	Oct	Nov	Dec
Oklahoma City	Avg. high	50 °F (10 °C)	55 °F (13 °C)	63 °F (17 °C)	73 °F (23 °C)	80 °F (27 °C)	88 °F (31 °C)	94 °F (34 °C)	93 °F (34 °C)	85 °F (29 °C)	73 °F (23 °C)	62 °F (17 °C)	51 °F (11 °C)
Oklahoma City	Avg. low	29 °F (−2 °C)	33 °F (1 °C)	41 °F (5 °C)	50 °F (10 °C)	60 °F (16 °C)	68 °F (20 °C)	72 °F (22 °C)	71 °F (22 °C)	63 °F (17 °C)	52 °F (11 °C)	40 °F (4 °C)	31 °F (−1 °C)
Tulsa	Avg. high	48 °F (9 °C)	53 °F (12 °C)	62 °F (17 °C)	72 °F (22 °C)	79 °F (26 °C)	88 °F (31 °C)	93 °F (34 °C)	93 °F (34 °C)	84 °F (29 °C)	73 °F (23 °C)	61 °F (16 °C)	49 °F (9 °C)
Tulsa	Avg. low	27 °F (−3 °C)	31 °F (−1 °C)	40 °F (4 °C)	49 °F (9 °C)	59 °F (15 °C)	68 °F (20 °C)	73 °F (23 °C)	71 °F (22 °C)	62 °F (17 °C)	51 °F (11 °C)	40 °F (4 °C)	30 °F (−1 °C)
Lawton	Avg. high	50 °F (10 °C)	56 °F (13 °C)	65 °F (18 °C)	73 °F (23 °C)	82 °F (28 °C)	90 °F (32 °C)	96 °F (36 °C)	95 °F (35 °C)	86 °F (30 °C)	76 °F (24 °C)	62 °F (17 °C)	52 °F (11 °C)
Lawton	Avg. low	26 °F (−3 °C)	31 °F (−1 °C)	40 °F (4 °C)	49 °F (9 °C)	59 °F (15 °C)	68 °F (20 °C)	73 °F (23 °C)	71 °F (22 °C)	63 °F (17 °C)	51 °F (11 °C)	39 °F (4 °C)	30 °F (−1 °C)

=== Cities and towns ===
Oklahoma had 598 incorporated places in 2010, including four cities over 100,000 in population and 43 over 10,000. Two of the fifty largest cities in the United States are in Oklahoma, Oklahoma City and Tulsa. Sixty-five percent of Oklahomans live within their metropolitan areas, or spheres of economic and social influence defined by the United States Census Bureau as a metropolitan statistical area. Oklahoma City, the state's capital and largest city, had the largest metropolitan area in the state in 2020, with 1,425,695 people. The metropolitan area of Tulsa had 1,015,331 residents. Between 2000 and 2010, the leading cities in population growth were Blanchard (172.4%), Elgin (78.2%), Jenks (77.0%), Piedmont (56.7%), Bixby (56.6%), and Owasso (56.3%).

In descending order of population, Oklahoma's largest cities in 2010 were: Oklahoma City (579,999, +14.6%), Tulsa (391,906, −0.3%), Norman (110,925, +15.9%), Broken Arrow (98,850, +32.0%), Lawton (96,867, +4.4%), Edmond (81,405, +19.2%), Moore (55,081, +33.9%), Midwest City (54,371, +0.5%), Enid (49,379, +5.0%), and Stillwater (45,688, +17.0%). Of the state's ten largest cities, three are outside the metropolitan areas of Oklahoma City and Tulsa, and only Lawton has a metropolitan statistical area of its own as designated by the United States Census Bureau, though the metropolitan statistical area of Fort Smith, Arkansas extends into the state.

Under Oklahoma law, municipalities are divided into two categories: cities, defined as having more than 1,000 residents, and towns, with under 1,000 residents. Both have legislative, judicial, and public power within their boundaries, but cities can choose between a mayor–council, council–manager, or strong mayor form of government, while towns operate through an elected officer system.

Largest cities or towns in Oklahoma Source (2020):
Rank	Name	County	Pop.
1	Oklahoma City	Oklahoma	681,054
2	Tulsa	Tulsa	413,066
3	Norman	Cleveland	128,026
4	Broken Arrow	Tulsa	113,540
5	Edmond	Oklahoma	94,428
6	Lawton	Comanche	90,381
7	Moore	Cleveland	62,793
8	Midwest City	Oklahoma	58,409
9	Enid	Garfield	51,308
10	Stillwater	Payne	48,394

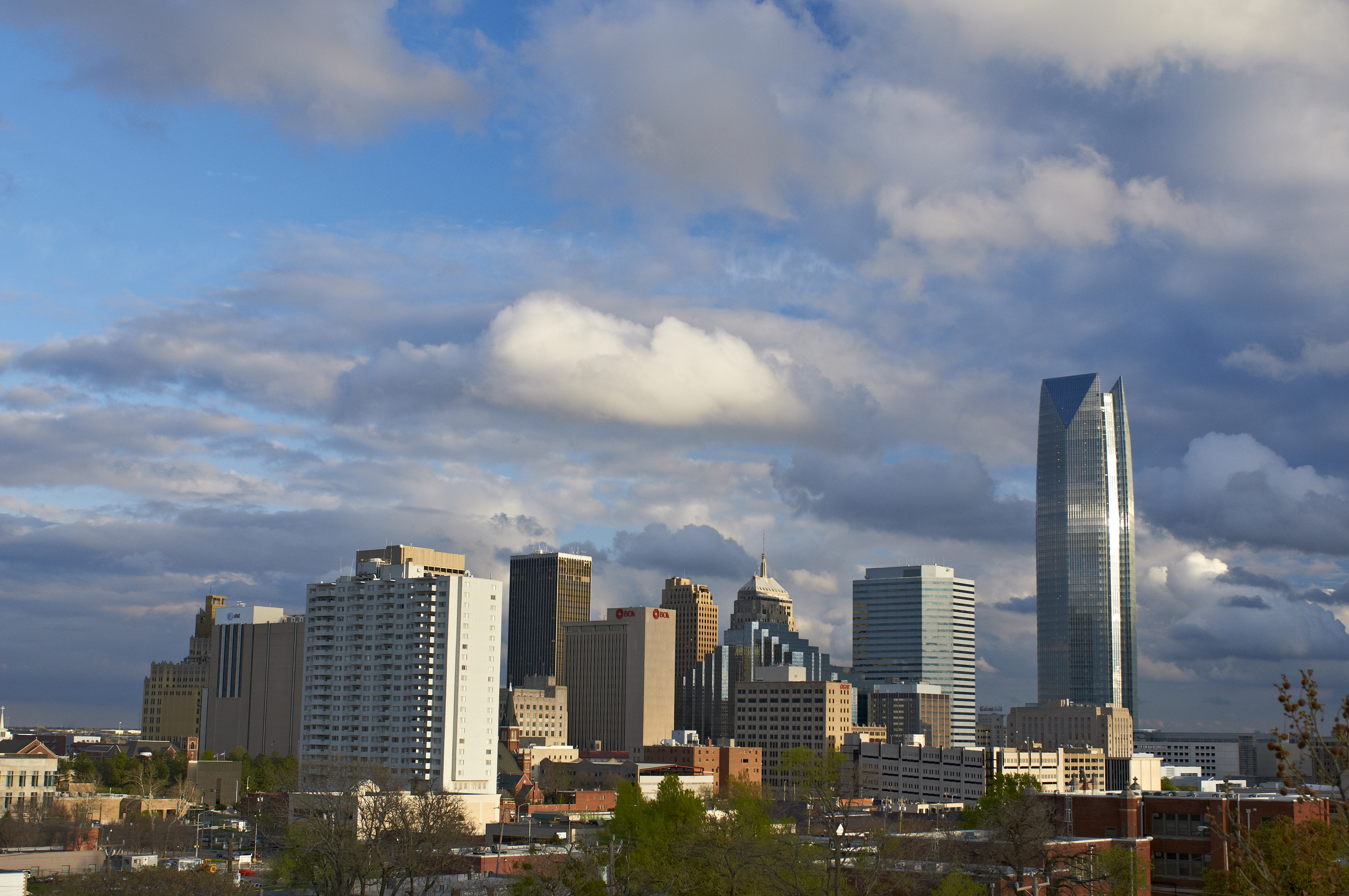
Oklahoma City

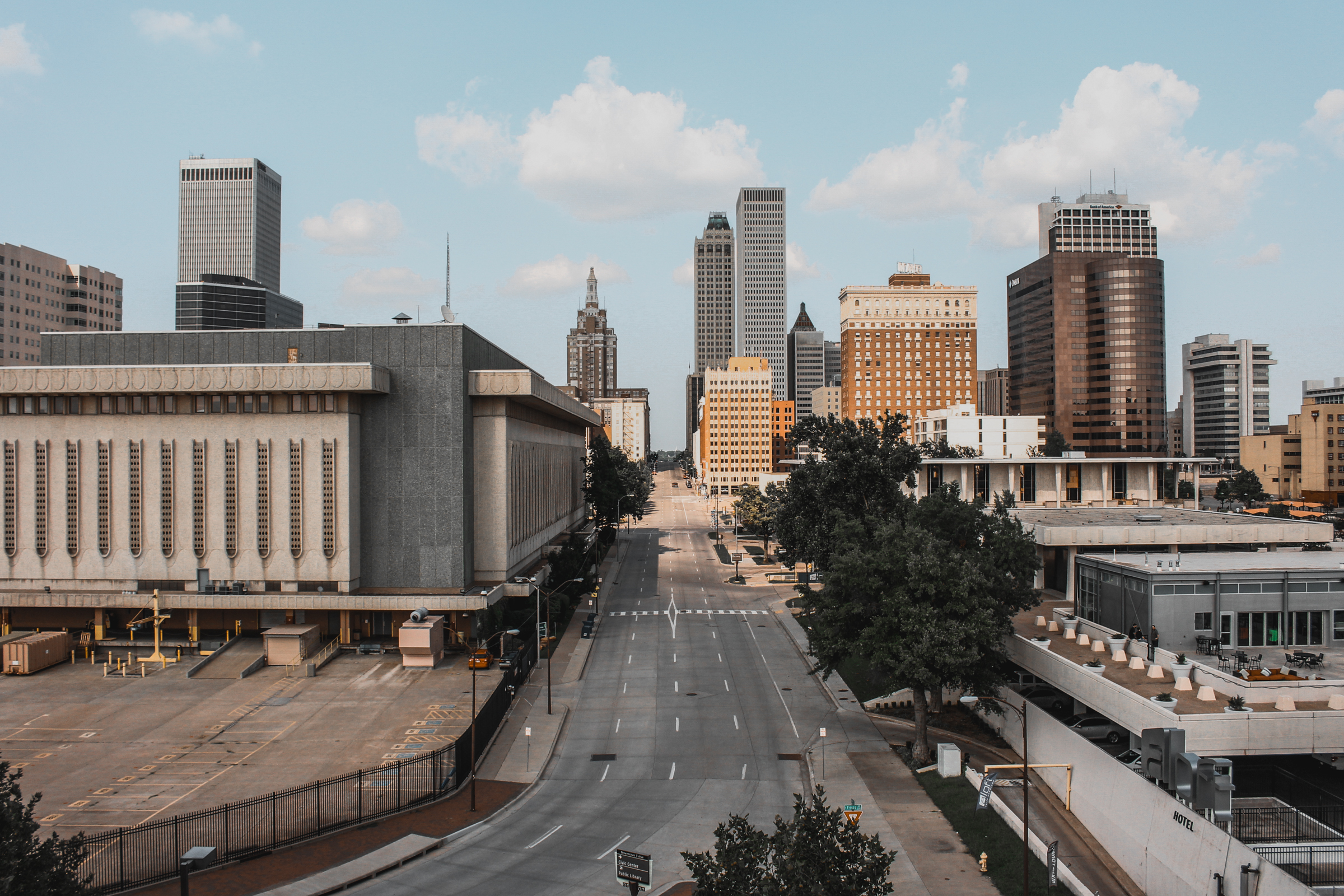
Tulsa

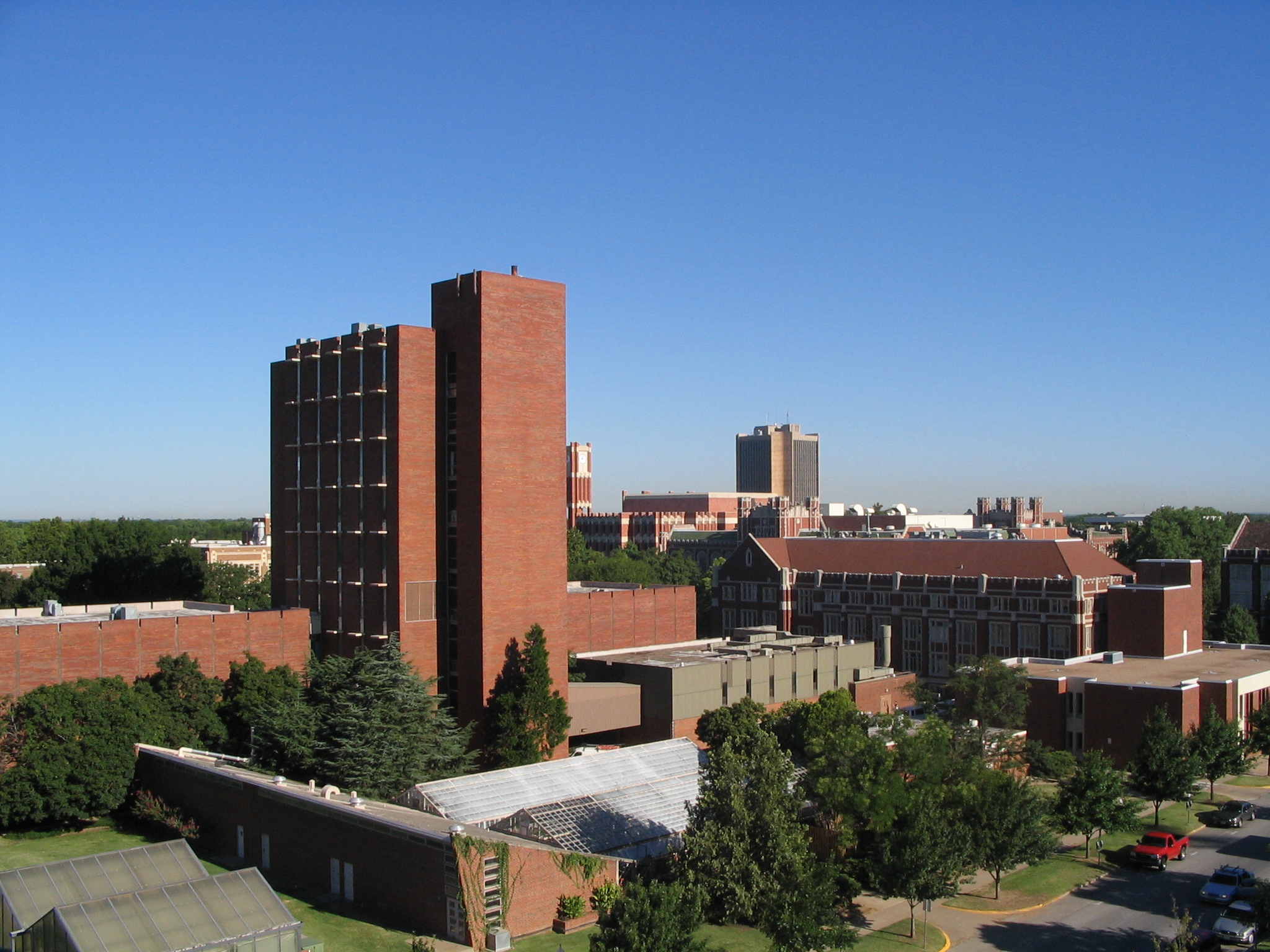
Norman

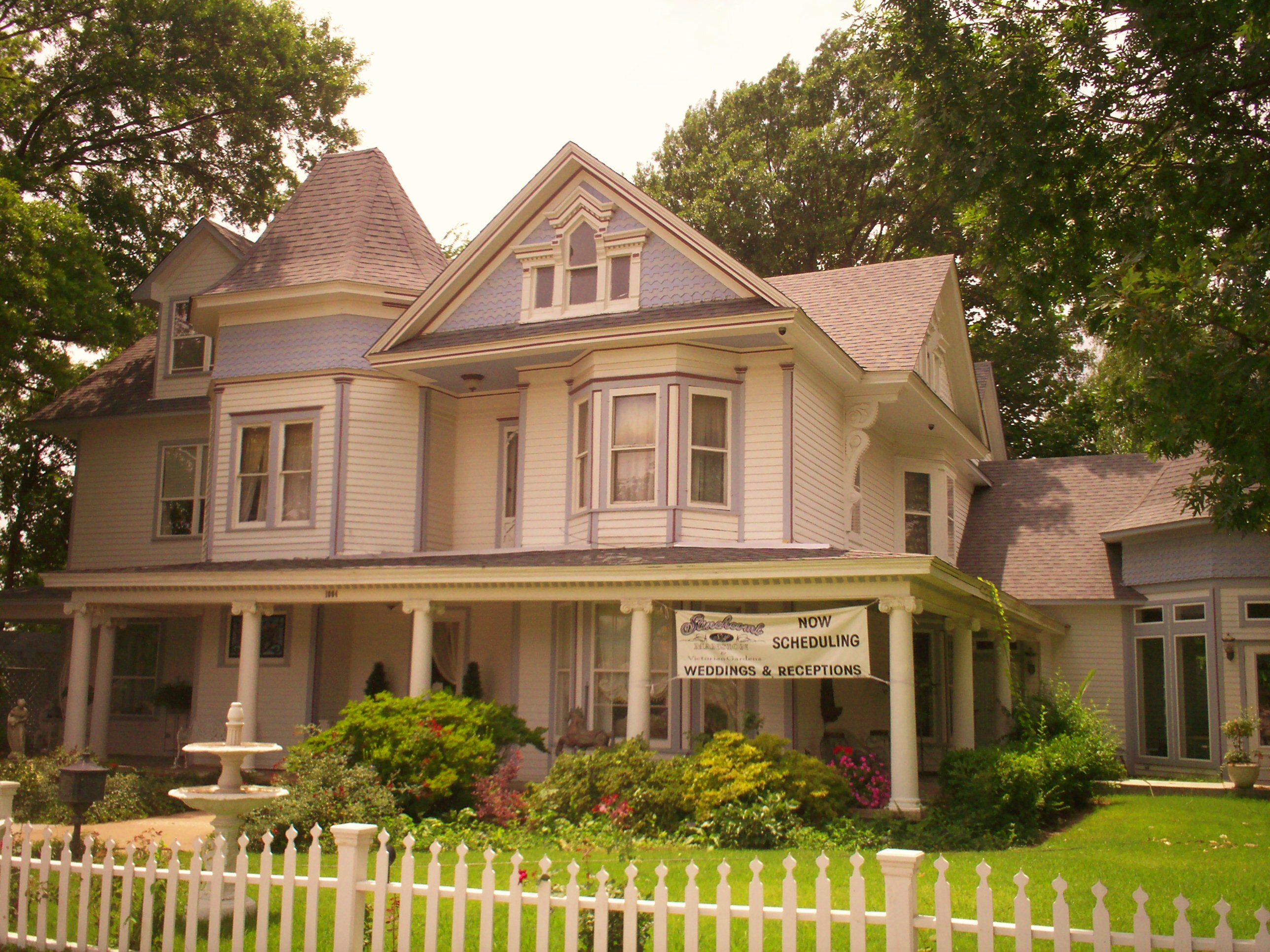
Broken Arrow

== Demographics ==
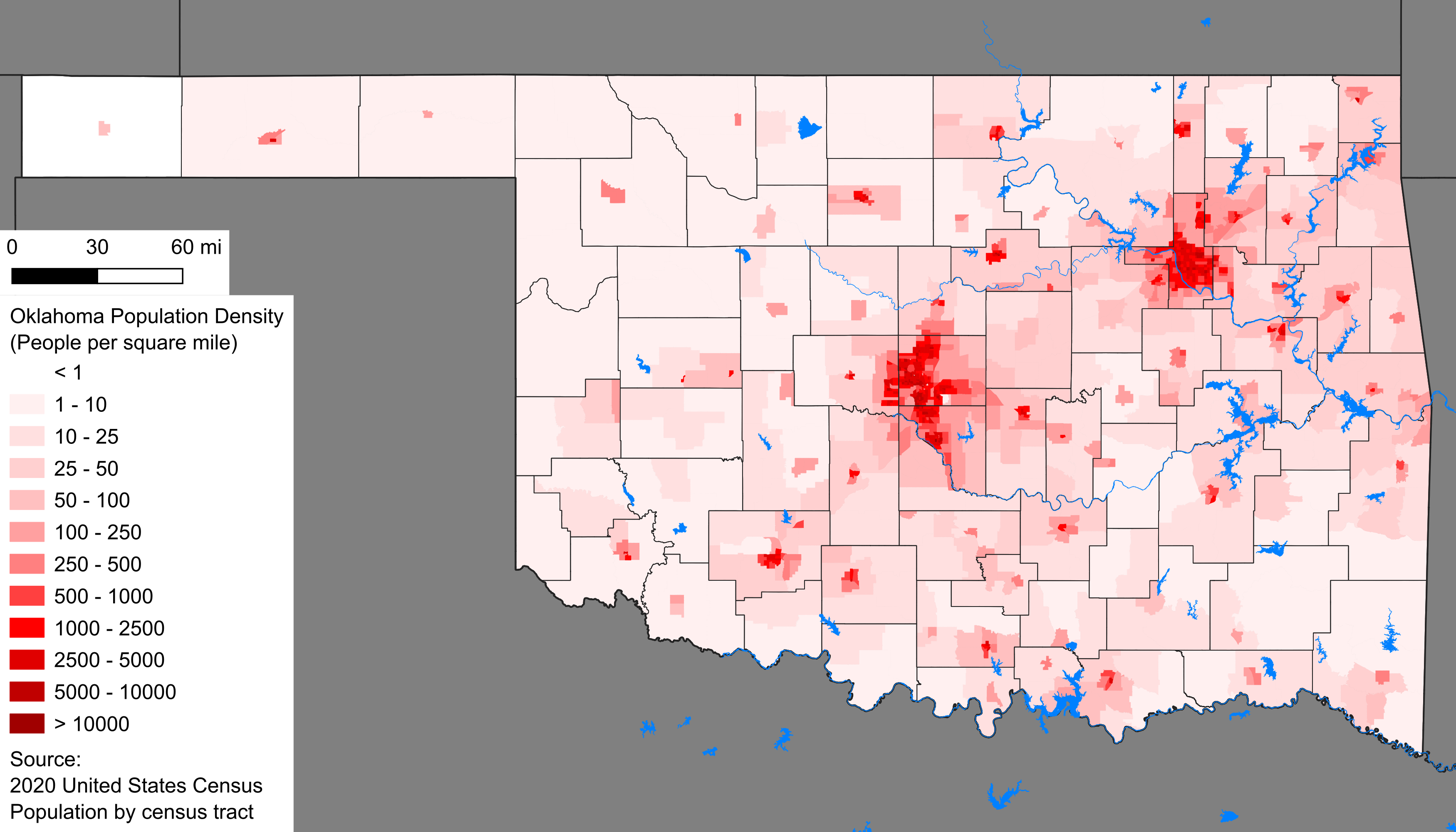
A map of Oklahoma's population density

Historical population
Census	Pop.	Note	%±
1890	258,657		—
1900	790,391		205.6%
1910	1,657,155		109.7%
1920	2,028,283		22.4%
1930	2,396,040		18.1%
1940	2,336,433		−2.5%
1950	2,233,513		−4.4%
1960	2,328,284		4.2%
1970	2,559,229		9.9%
1980	3,025,290		18.2%
1990	3,145,585		4.0%
2000	3,450,654		9.7%
2010	3,751,675		8.7%
2020	3,959,353		5.5%
2025 (est.)	4,123,288		4.1%
U.S. Decennial Census

From a 1920 U.S. census population of 2,028,283, Oklahoma's population has continued to increase. At the 2010 census, its population was 3,751,675. The 2020 census revealed its population to be was 3,959,353, an 5.5% increase since 2010. A 2022 American Community Survey estimate found that the population had surpassed 4 million residents for the first time. Among the states of the South Central region, Oklahoma had the second-largest population increase from 2010 to 2020, behind Texas.

In 2018, of Oklahoma's total resident population, approximately 236,882 were immigrants, making up 6% of Oklahoma's population at the time. Most of its immigrant population came from Mexico (45%), Vietnam (5%), India (5%), Germany (3%), and Guatemala (3%). In the state, 246,550 residents were native-born Americans who had at least one immigrant parent. An estimated 85,000 immigrants were undocumented with 125,989 Oklahomans having lived with at least one undocumented family member between 2010 and 2014. Immigrants to Oklahoma have contributed more than a billion U.S. dollars in taxes in 2018.

In 2011, the U.S. Census Bureau's American Community Survey data from 2005 to 2009 indicated about 5% of Oklahoma's residents were born outside the United States. This was lower than the national figure of about 12.5% of U.S. residents being foreign-born.

In 2010, the center of population of Oklahoma was in Lincoln County, near the town of Sparks.

According to HUD's 2022 Annual Homeless Assessment Report, there were an estimated 3,754 homeless people in Oklahoma.

=== Race and ethnicity ===
Map of counties in Oklahoma by racial plurality, per the 2020 U.S. census Legend: | Non-Hispanic White 50–60% 60–70% 70–80% 80–90% | Native American 40–50% 50–60% | Hispanic or Latino 50–60% |

As with the majority of the U.S., Oklahoma has experienced diversification since the beginning of the 21st century. In 1940, 90.1% of the state's population was non-Hispanic White. In 2020, 75.5% of the population was White, down from 1990's 81% yet up from 2010's 72.2%. Among its population at the 2020 census, the remainder of its increasingly diverse population was 11.9% Hispanic or Latino of any race, 16% American Indian and Alaska Native, 9.7% Black or African American, 3.1% Asian, 0.4% Native Hawaiian and other Pacific Islander, and 9% some other race.

In the 2010 census, 8.6% were American Indian and Alaska Native, 7.4% Black or African American, 1.7% Asian, 0.1% Native Hawaiian and other Pacific Islander, 4.1% from some other race and 5.9% of two or more races; 8.9% of Oklahoma's population were of Hispanic, Latino, or Spanish origin (they may be of any race).

Historical racial demographics
Racial composition	1940	1970	1990	2010	2020
White	90.1%	89.1%	81%	72.2%	63.5%
Hispanic (Any Race)	–	–	2.7%	8.9%	11.9%
Native	2.7%	3.8%	8%	8.6%	8.4%
Black	7.2%	6.7%	7.4%	7.4%	7.3%
Asian (Included; Pacific Islanders before 1990)	-	0.1%	1.1%	1.7%	2.3%
Native Hawaiian and other Pacific Islander	–	–	–	0.1%	0.2%
Other race	–	0.2%	1.3%	4.1%	5.4%
Two or more races	–	–	–	5.9%	12.8%

Oklahoma racial composition by ethnicity, including in combination
Racial composition	2010	2020
White	77.5%	75.5%
Hispanic	8.9%	11.9%
Native	12.9%	16%
Black	8.7%	9.7%
Asian	2.2%	3.1%
Native Hawaiian and other Pacific Islander	0.2%	0.4%
Other race	4.7%	9%

Oklahoma – Racial and ethnic composition Note: the US Census treats Hispanic/Latino as an ethnic category. This table excludes Latinos from the racial categories and assigns them to a separate category. Hispanics/Latinos may be of any race.
Race / Ethnicity (NH = Non-Hispanic)	Pop 2000	Pop 2010	Pop 2020	% 2000	% 2010	% 2020
White alone (NH)	2,556,368	2,575,381	2,407,188	74.08%	68.65%	60.80%
Black or African American alone (NH)	257,981	272,071	283,242	7.48%	7.25%	7.15%
Native American or Alaska Native alone (NH)	266,158	308,733	311,890	7.71%	8.23%	7.88%
Asian alone (NH)	46,172	64,154	89,653	1.34%	1.71%	2.26%
Pacific Islander alone (NH)	2,100	3,977	8,168	0.06%	0.11%	0.21%
Other race alone (NH)	2,322	2,954	13,602	0.07%	0.08%	0.34%
Mixed race or Multiracial (NH)	140,249	192,074	373,679	4.06%	5.12%	9.44%
Hispanic or Latino (any race)	179,304	332,007	471,931	5.20%	8.85%	11.92%
Total	3,450,654	3,751,351	3,959,353	100.00%	100.00%	100.00%

Oklahoma Tribal Statistical Areas (teal)

In 2005, Oklahoma's estimated ancestral makeup was 14.5% German, 13.1% American, 11.8% Irish, 9.6% English, 8.1% African American, and 11.4% Native American (including 7.9% Cherokee), though the percentage of people claiming American Indian as their only race was 8.1%.

Most people from Oklahoma who self-identify as having American ancestry are of overwhelmingly English and Scots-Irish ancestry with significant amounts of Scottish, Welsh, and Irish ancestry.The majority of Hispanics in Oklahoma are of Mexican origin. There are 38 federally recognized Native American tribes in Oklahoma.

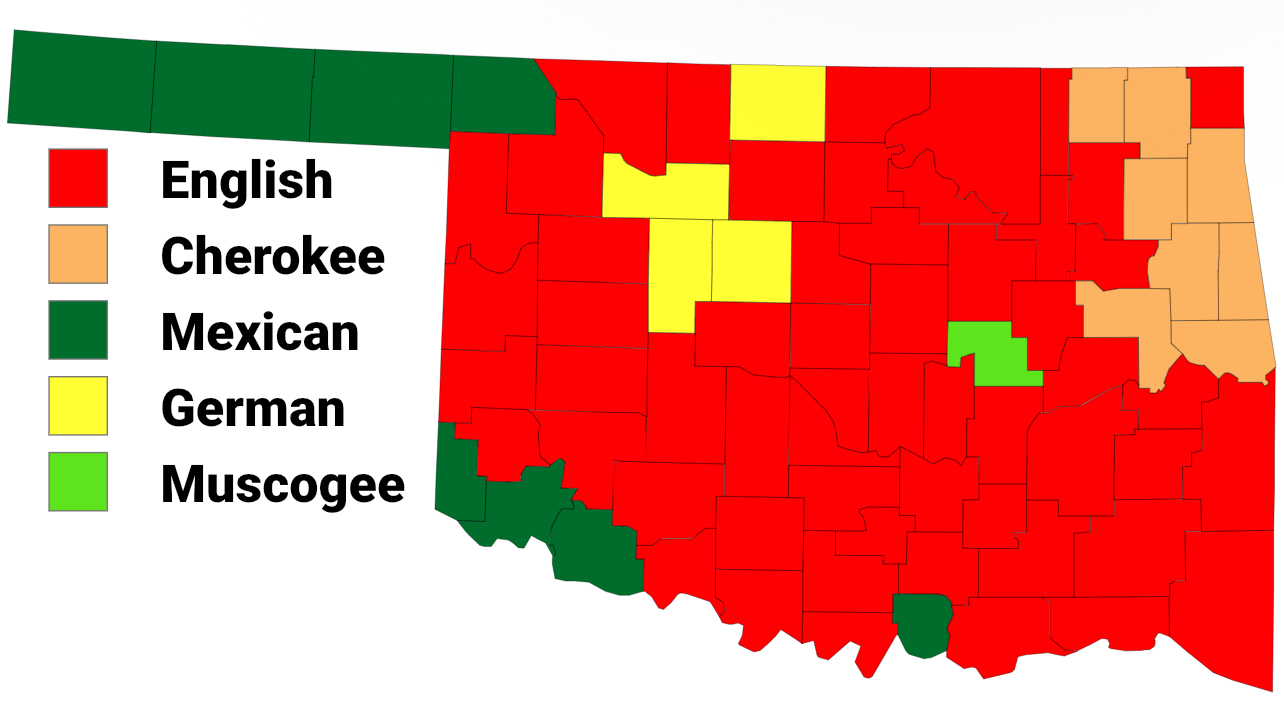
Largest alone or in any combination ethnic origin by county in Oklahoma, per the 2020 census

In 2011, 47.3% of Oklahoma's population younger than age 1 were minorities, meaning they had at least one parent who was not non-Hispanic white.

=== Language ===
Oklahoma English
- Region: Oklahoma
- Ethnicity: Okies
- Language family: Indo-European: Germanic; West Germanic; Ingvaeonic; Anglo–Frisian; Anglic; English; North American English; American English; Southern American English; American Inland South English; Oklahoma English
- Early forms: Old English: Middle English; Early Modern English
- Writing system: Latin (English alphabet); American Braille

Language codes
- ISO 639-3: –
- Glottolog: ozar1236

Recording of a Cherokee language stomp dance ceremony in Oklahoma

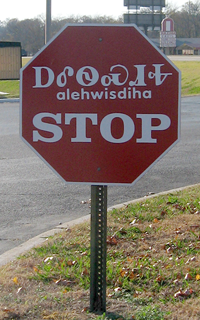
Located in Tahlequah, this stop sign includes Cherokee lettering.

==== English ====
The English language has been official in the state of Oklahoma since 2010. The variety of North American English spoken is called Oklahoma English, which is "quite diverse with its uneven blending of features of North Midland, South Midland, and Southern dialects". In 2000, 2,977,187 Oklahomans—92.6% of the resident population, five years or older—spoke only English at home, a decrease from 95% in 1990. 238,732 Oklahoma residents reported speaking a language other than English at home in the 2000 census, about 7.4% of the state's population.

==== Native American languages ====
The two most commonly spoken native North American languages are Cherokee and Choctaw, with 10,000 Cherokee speakers living within the Cherokee Nation tribal jurisdiction area of eastern Oklahoma and another 10,000 Choctaw speakers living in the Choctaw Nation directly south of the Cherokees. Cherokee is an official language in the Cherokee Nation tribal jurisdiction area and in the United Keetoowah Band of Cherokee Indians.

Twenty-five Native American languages are spoken in Oklahoma, second only to California. However, only Cherokee, if any, exhibits some language vitality at present. Ethnologue sees Cherokee as moribund because the only remaining active users of the language are members of the grandparent generation and older.

==== Other languages ====
Top 10 non-English languages spoken in Oklahoma
Language	Percentage of population (as of 2000)
Spanish	4.4%
Native North American languages	0.6%
German and Vietnamese (tied)	0.4%
French	0.3%
Chinese	0.2%
Korean, Arabic, Tagalog, Japanese (tied)	0.1%

Spanish is the second-most commonly spoken language in Oklahoma, with 141,060 speakers counted in 2000. German has 13,444 speakers representing about 0.4% of the state's population. Vietnamese is spoken by 11,330 people, or about 0.4% of the population, many of whom live in the Asia District of Oklahoma City. Other languages include French with 8,258 speakers (0.3%), Chinese with 6,413 (0.2%), Korean with 3,948 (0.1%), Arabic with 3,265 (0.1%), other Asian languages with 3,134 (0.1%), Tagalog with 2,888 (0.1%), Japanese with 2,546 (0.1%), and African languages with 2,546 (0.1%).

=== Religion ===
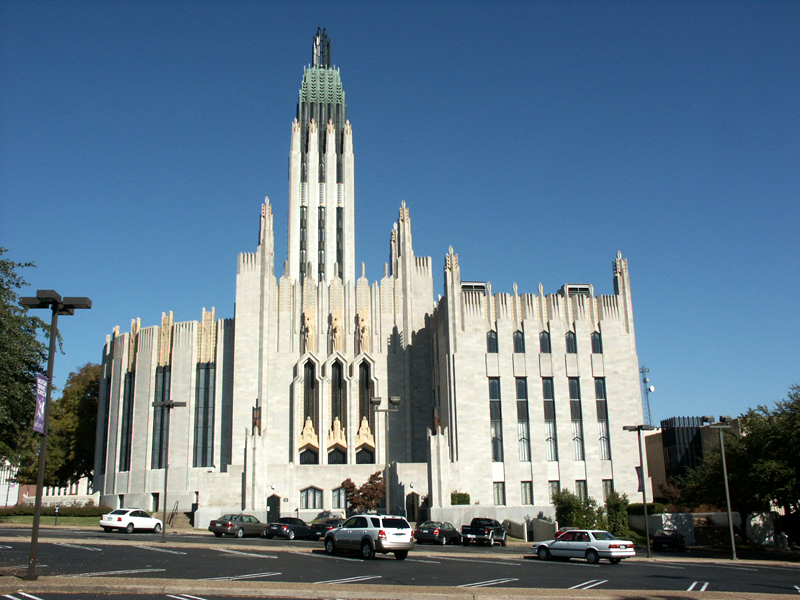
The Boston Avenue Methodist Church in Tulsa is a National Historic Landmark.

Oklahoma is part of a geographical region characterized by conservative and Evangelical Protestant Christianity known as the "Bible Belt". Spanning the southern and eastern parts of the United States, the area is known for politically and socially conservative views, with the Republican Party having the greater number of voters registered between the two major parties. Tulsa, the state's second-largest city, home to Oral Roberts University, is sometimes called the "buckle of the Bible Belt".

In 2000, there were about 5,000 Jews and 6,000 Muslims, with ten congregations to each group.

According to the Pew Research Center in 2008, the majority of Oklahoma's religious adherents were Christian, accounting for about 80% of the population. The percentage of Catholics was half the national average, while the percentage of Evangelical Protestants was more than twice the national average, tied with Arkansas for the largest percentage of any state.

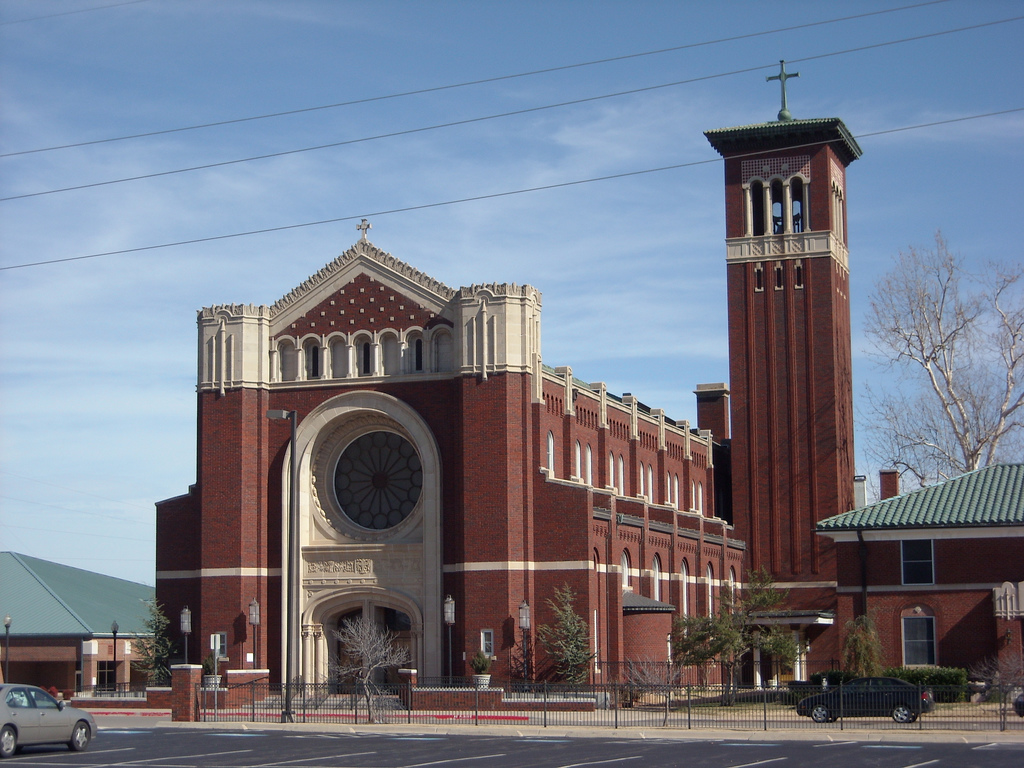
The Cathedral of Our Lady of Perpetual Help in Oklahoma City

In 2010, the state's largest church memberships were in the Southern Baptist Convention (886,394 members), the United Methodist Church (282,347), the Roman Catholic Church (178,430), and the Assemblies of God (85,926) and Church of Jesus Christ of Latter-day Saints (LDS Church) (47,349). Other religions represented in the state include Buddhism, Hinduism, and Islam.

According to the Pew Research Center in 2014, the majority of Oklahoma's religious adherents remained Christian accounting for 79% of the population, 9 percent higher than the national average. The percentage of Evangelical Protestants declined since the last study, but they remain the largest religious group in the state at 47% over 20 percent higher than the national average. The largest growth over the six years between Pew's 2008 and 2014 survey was in the number of people who identify as unaffiliated in the state with an increase of 6% of the total population.

By the 2020 Public Religion Research Institute's survey, 73% of the population were Christian. Evangelicalism made up 29% of the state population, followed by Mainline Protestantism at 19%. Historically and predominantly African-American and Latino churches collectively made up 8% of the religious demographic. An estimated 13% of the state's religious population were Roman Catholic. About 22% of the population had no religious affiliation.

In April 2025, the Oklahoma Legislature passed a non-binding concurrent resolution proclaiming Christ the King and recognize "the enduring influence of Christian faith in the lives of its people."

Religious affiliation in Oklahoma
Religion	2008 (Note: Determined by a survey by the Pew Research Center in 2008. Percentages represent claimed religious beliefs, not necessarily membership in any particular congregation. Figures have a ±5 percent margin of error.)	2014	2023–2024
Evangelical Protestant	53%	47%	47%
Mainline Protestant	16%	18%	11%
Historically Black Protestant	3%	4%	4%
Catholic	12%	8%	8%
Mormon	<0.5%	1%	1%
Orthodox Christianity	<0.5%	<1%	<1%
Jehovah's Witness	<0.5%	<1%	<1%
Other Christians	1%	<1%	<1%
Jewish	1%	<1%	1%
Muslim	<0.5%	<1%	<1%
Buddhist	1%	<1%	<1%
Hindu	<0.5%	<1%	<1%
Other world faiths	<0.5%	<1%	<1%
Unaffiliated, Atheist, Agnostic, and nothing in particular	12%	18%	26%
Unitarians, Humanists, Deists, Spiritual but not religious, Eclectic, and "other liberal faiths"	No data	<1%	1%
New Age religion, Pagans or Wiccan	No data	<1%	<1%
Native American religions	No data	<1%	<1%
Don't know	1%	1%	1%

=== Incarceration ===
Oklahoma has been described as "the world's prison capital", with 1,079 of every 100,000 residents imprisoned in 2018, the highest incarceration rate of any American state, and by comparison, higher than the incarceration rates of any country in the world.

=== Gender issues ===
In an April 2023 report, The Sentencing Project highlighted Oklahoma's Failure to Protect law, which has "been used primarily against women" and has "sometimes resulted in survivors of abuse facing longer sentences for allegedly failing to protect their children from harm than the person who committed the abuse". The report states that "since the law went into effect in 2009, 139 women in Oklahoma have been imprisoned solely for failure-to-protect charges". The Human Rights Campaign has also pointed out cases of the Oklahoma legislature's actions against the LGBTQ population and censuring of a nonbinary lawmaker.

== Economy ==
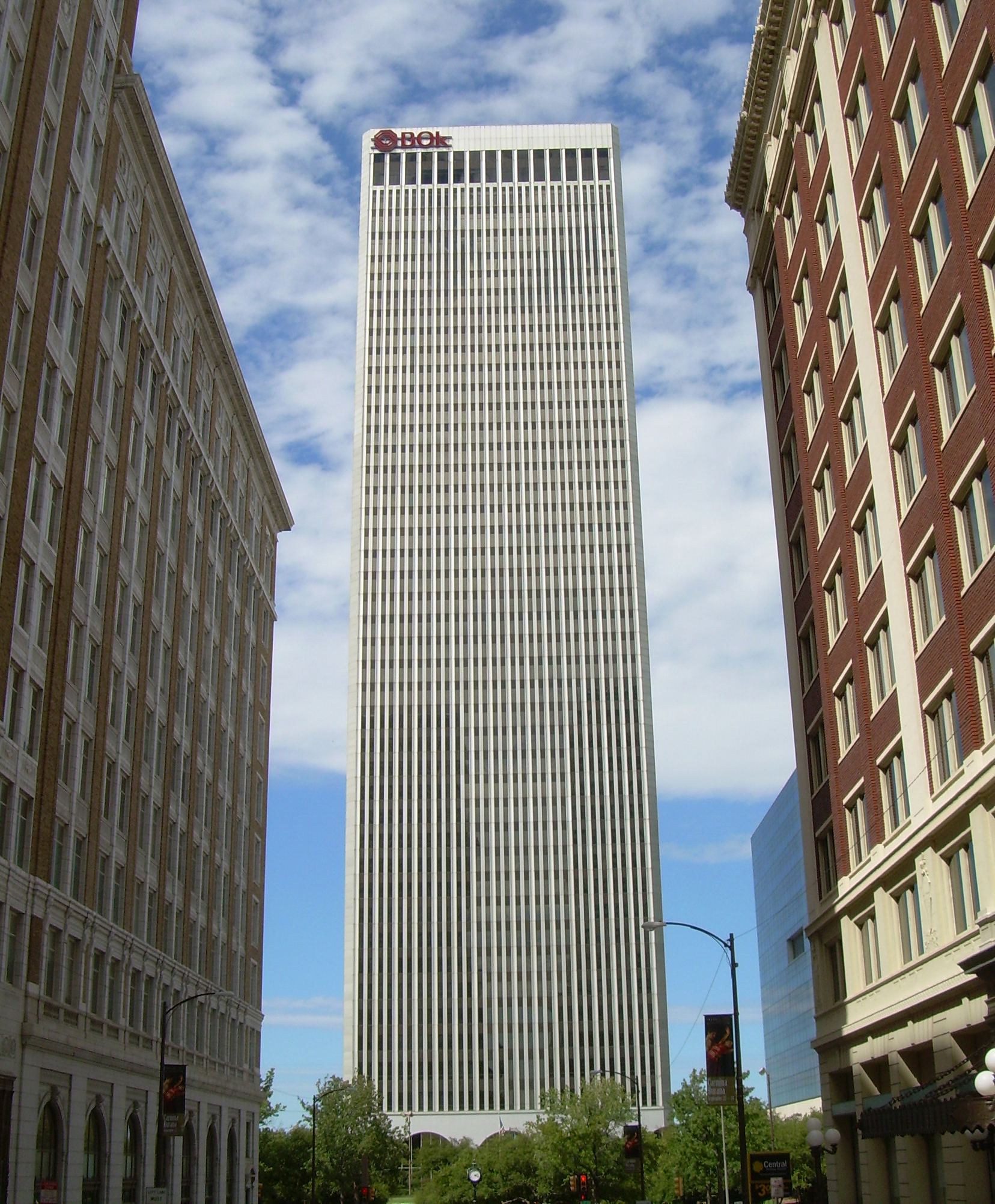
The BOK Tower in Tulsa, Oklahoma's second-tallest building, serves as the world headquarters for the Williams Companies.

In 2025, Oklahoma's gross domestic product was $274.4 billion and the state had a per capita personal income of $66,660. Its median household income ranked 46th at $59,673 in 2023. Additionally, Oklahoma ranks consistently among the lowest states in cost of living index.

Oklahoma is host to a diverse range of sectors including aviation, energy, transportation equipment, food processing, electronics, and telecommunications. Oklahoma is an important producer of natural gas, aircraft, and food. The state ranks third in the nation for production of natural gas, is the 27th-most agriculturally productive state, and also ranks 5th in production of wheat. Four Fortune 500 companies and six Fortune 1000 companies are headquartered in Oklahoma, and it has been rated one of the most business-friendly states in the nation, with the 7th-lowest tax burden in 2007.

- Total employment (2018): 1,385,228
- Number of employer establishments: 93,561

In 2010, Oklahoma City-based Love's Travel Stops & Country Stores ranked 18th on the Forbes list of largest private companies, Tulsa-based QuikTrip ranked 37th, and Oklahoma City-based Hobby Lobby ranked 198th in 2010 report.

Though oil has historically dominated the state's economy, a collapse in the energy industry during the 1980s led to the loss of nearly 90,000 energy-related jobs between 1980 and 2000, severely damaging the local economy. Oil accounted for 35 billion dollars in Oklahoma's economy in 2007, and employment in the state's oil industry was outpaced by five other industries in 2007. As of May 2025, the state's unemployment rate was 3.1%. In 2025, small businesses made up 99.4% of businesses in Oklahoma and employed 50.8% of the state's work force.

=== Industry ===
In mid-2011, Oklahoma had a civilian labor force of 1.7 million and non-farm employment fluctuated around 1.5 million. The government sector provides the most jobs, with 339,300 in 2011, followed by the transportation and utilities sector, providing 279,500 jobs, and the sectors of education, business, and manufacturing, providing 207,800, 177,400, and 132,700 jobs, respectively. Among the state's largest industries, the aerospace sector generates $11 billion annually.

Tulsa is home to the largest airline maintenance base in the world, which serves as the global maintenance and engineering headquarters for American Airlines. In total, aerospace accounts for more than 10 percent of Oklahoma's industrial output, and it is one of the top 10 states in aerospace engine manufacturing. Because of its position in the center of the United States, Oklahoma is also among the top states for logistic centers, and a major contributor to weather-related research.

The state is the top manufacturer of tires in North America and contains one of the fastest-growing biotechnology industries in the nation. In 2005, international exports from Oklahoma's manufacturing industry totaled $4.3 billion, accounting for 3.6 percent of its economic impact. Tire manufacturing, meat processing, oil and gas equipment manufacturing, and air conditioner manufacturing are the state's largest manufacturing industries.

=== Energy ===
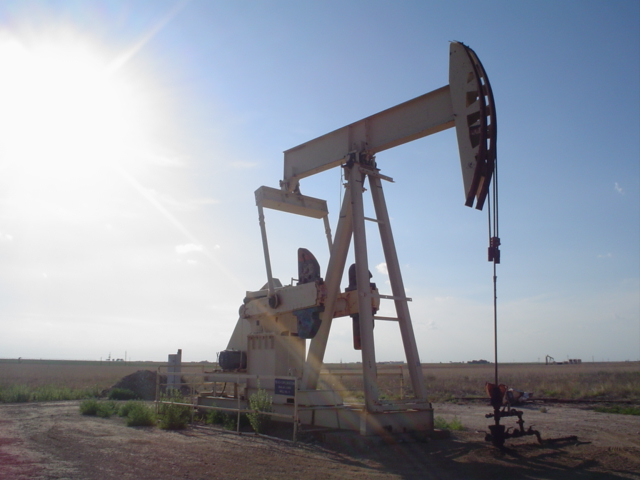
A major oil-producing state, Oklahoma is the fifth-largest producer of crude oil in the United States.

Oklahoma is the nation's third-largest producer of natural gas, and its fifth-largest producer of crude oil. The state also has the second-greatest number of active drilling rigs, and it is even ranked fifth in crude oil reserves. While the state was ranked eighth for installed wind energy capacity in 2011, it still was at the bottom of states in usage of renewable energy in 2009, with 94% of its electricity being generated by non-renewable sources in 2009, including 25% from coal and 46% from natural gas.

In 2019, 53.5% of electricity was produced from natural gas and 34.6% from wind power.

Ranking 13th for total energy consumption per capita in 2009, the state's energy costs were eighth-lowest in the nation.

==== Oil, gas, and coal ====
As a whole, the oil energy industry contributes $35 billion to Oklahoma's gross domestic product (GDP), and employees of the state's oil-related companies earn an average of twice the state's typical yearly income. In 2009, the state had 83,700 commercial oil wells churning 65.374 million barrels (10,393,600 m^{3}) of crude oil. A tabulated 8.5% of the nation's natural gas supply is held in Oklahoma, with 1.673 trillion cubic feet (47.4 km^{3}) being produced in 2009.

The Oklahoma Stack Play is a geographic referenced area in the Anadarko Basin. The oil field "Sooner Trend", Anadarko basin and the counties of Kingfisher and Canadian make up the basis for the "Oklahoma STACK". Other Plays such as the Eagle Ford are geological rather than geographical.

All of the Fortune 500 companies based in Oklahoma are energy-related, including some of the largest companies in the petroleum industry in the U.S. Tulsa's ONEOK and the Williams Companies are the state's largest and second-largest companies respectively, also ranking as the nation's second- and third-largest companies in the field of energy, according to Fortune magazine.

Oklahoma Gas & Electric, commonly referred to as OG&E (NYSE: OGE) operates four base electric power plants in Oklahoma. Two of them are coal-fired power plants: one in Muskogee, and the other in Red Rock. Two are gas-fired power plants: one in Harrah and the other in Konawa. OG&E was the first electric company in Oklahoma to generate electricity from wind farms in 2003.

==== Nuclear power ====
Oklahoma had no operational nuclear power plants as of March 2021.

In 1973, the Public Service Company of Oklahoma proposed the Black Fox Nuclear Power Plant near Inola, Oklahoma. Protestors disrupted project construction in 1979, several months after the Three Mile Island accident, and the project was cancelled in 1982 after nine years of legal challenges.

=== Agriculture ===
The 27th-most agriculturally productive state, Oklahoma is fifth in cattle production and fifth in production of wheat. Approximately 5.5 percent of American beef comes from Oklahoma, while the state produces 6.1 percent of American wheat, 4.2 percent of American pig products, and 2.2 percent of dairy products.

The state had 85,500 farms in 2012, collectively producing $4.3 billion in animal products and fewer than one billion dollars in crop output with more than $6.1 billion added to the state's gross domestic product. Poultry and swine are its second- and third-largest agricultural industries.

== Education ==
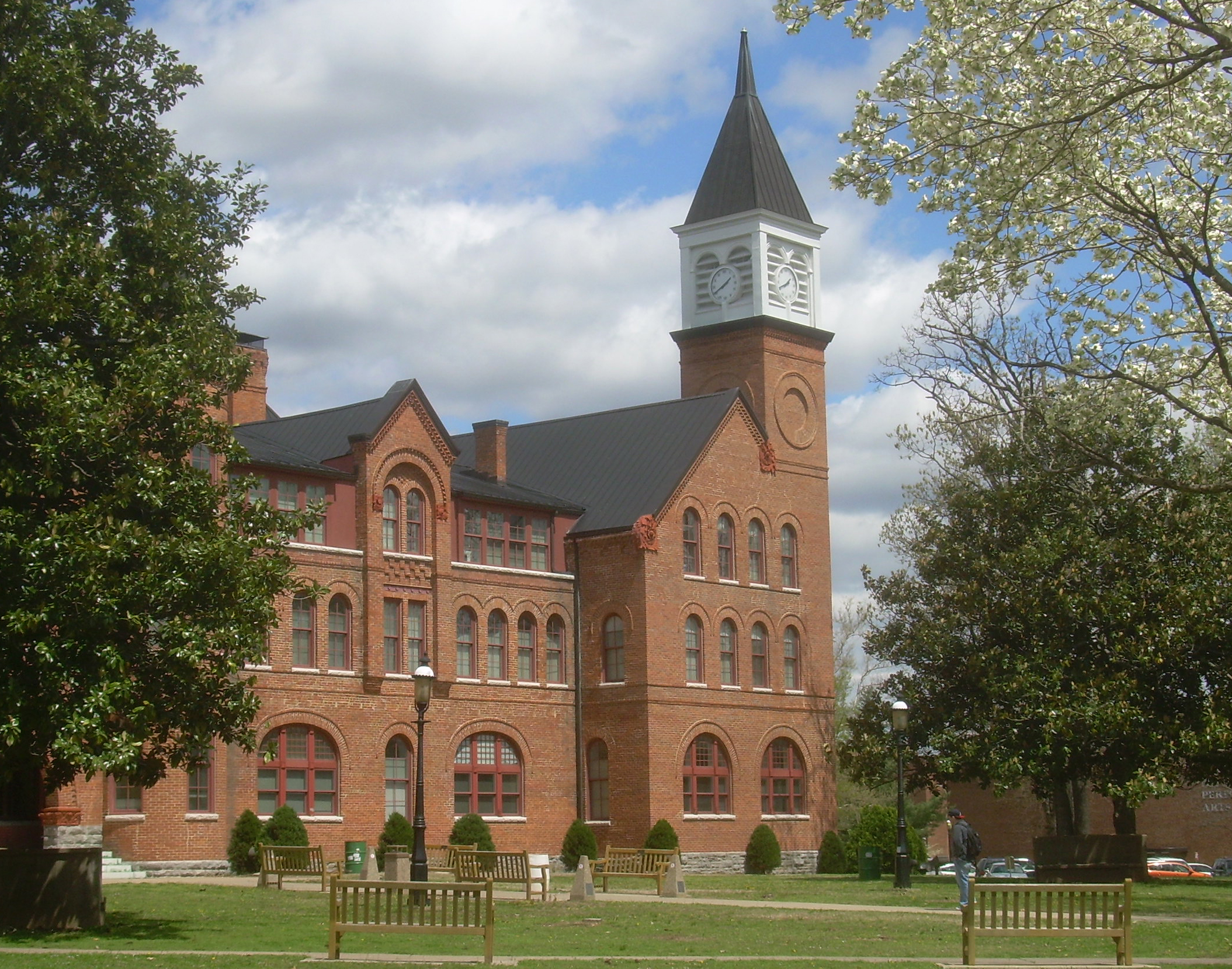
Oklahoma's system of public regional universities includes Northeastern State University in Tahlequah.

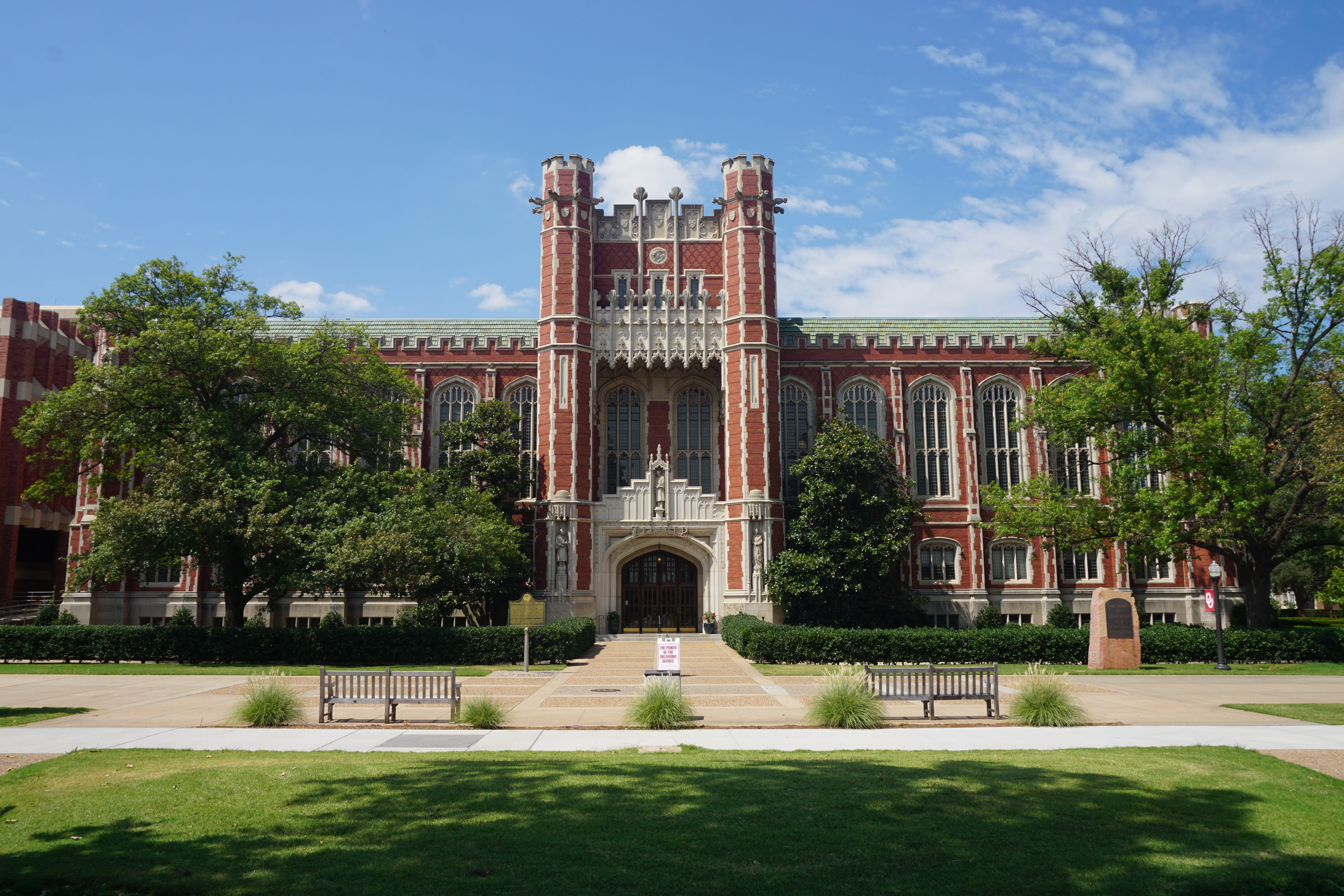
Bizzell Memorial Library, the heart of the University of Oklahoma in Norman

With an educational system made up of public school districts and independent private institutions, Oklahoma had 638,817 students enrolled in 1,845 public primary, secondary, and vocational schools in 533 school districts as of 2008. Oklahoma has the highest enrollment of Native American students in the nation with 126,078 students in the 2009–10 school year. Oklahoma spent $7,755 for each student in 2008, and was 47th in the nation in expenditures per student, though its growth of total education expenditures between 1992 and 2002 ranked 22nd.

The state is among the best in pre-kindergarten education, and the National Institute for Early Education Research rated it first in the United States with regard to standards, quality, and access to pre-kindergarten education in 2004, calling it "a model for early childhood schooling". High school dropout rate decreased from 3.1 to 2.5 percent between 2007 and 2008 with Oklahoma ranked among 18 other states with 3 percent or less dropout rate. In 2004, the state ranked 36th in the nation for the relative number of adults with high school diplomas, though at 85.2 percent, it had the highest rate among Southern states. According to a study conducted by the Pell Institute, Oklahoma ranks 48th in college-participation for low-income students.

The University of Oklahoma, The University of Tulsa, Oklahoma State University, the University of Central Oklahoma, and Northeastern State University are the largest institutions of higher education in Oklahoma, each operating through one primary campus and satellite campuses throughout the state. The two state universities, along with Oklahoma City University and the University of Tulsa, rank among the country's best universities.

Oklahoma City University School of Law, University of Oklahoma College of Law, and University of Tulsa College of Law are the state's only ABA-accredited institutions. Both University of Oklahoma and University of Tulsa are Tier 2 institutions, with the University of Oklahoma ranked 55th and the University of Tulsa ranked 120th in the nation.

Oklahoma holds eleven public regional universities, including Northeastern State University, the second-oldest institution of higher education west of the Mississippi River, also containing the only College of Optometry in Oklahoma and the largest enrollment of Native American students in the nation by percentage and amount. Langston University is Oklahoma's only historically black college. Six of the state's universities were placed in the Princeton Review's list of best 122 regional colleges in 2007, and three made the list of top colleges for best value. The state has 55 post-secondary technical institutions operated by Oklahoma's CareerTech program for training in specific fields of industry or trade.

In the 2007–2008 school year, there were 181,973 undergraduate students, 20,014 graduate students, and 4,395 first-professional degree students enrolled in Oklahoma colleges. Of these students, 18,892 received a bachelor's degree, 5,386 received a master's degree, and 462 received a first professional degree. This means the state of Oklahoma produces an average of 38,278-degree-holders per completions component (i.e. July 1, 2007 – June 30, 2008). National average is 68,322 total degrees awarded per completions component.

Beginning on April 2, 2018, tens of thousands of K–12 public school teachers went on strike due to lack of funding. According to the National Education Association, teachers in Oklahoma had ranked 49th out of the 50 states in terms of teacher pay in 2016. The Oklahoma Legislature had passed a measure a week earlier to raise teacher salaries by $6,100, but it fell short of the $10,000 raise for teachers, $5,000 raise for other school employees, and $200 million increase in extra education funding many had sought. A survey in 2019 found that the pay raise obtained by the strike lifted the State's teacher pay ranking to 34th in the nation.

=== Cherokee Language education ===
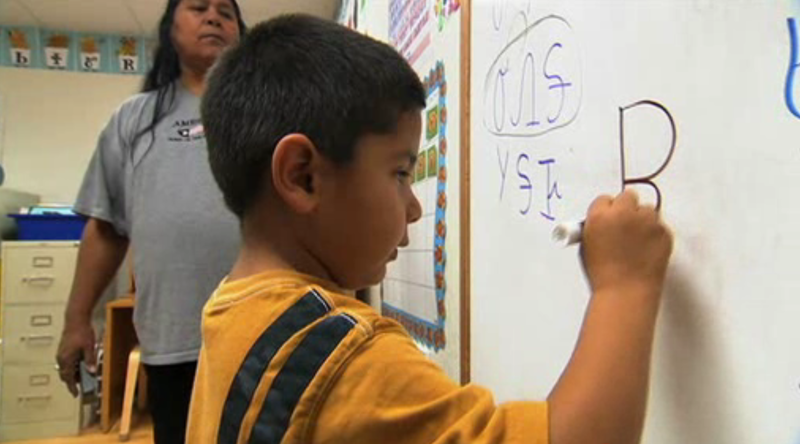
Writing in Cherokee

The Cherokee Nation implemented a ten-year plan in 2005 that involved growing new speakers of the Cherokee language from childhood as well as speaking it exclusively at home. The plan was part of an ambitious goal that in fifty years would have at least 80% of their people fluent. The Cherokee Preservation Foundation has invested $3 million into opening schools, training teachers, and developing curricula for language education, as well as initiating community gatherings where the language can be actively used. A Cherokee language immersion school in Tahlequah, Oklahoma educates students from pre-school through eighth grade.

== Culture ==
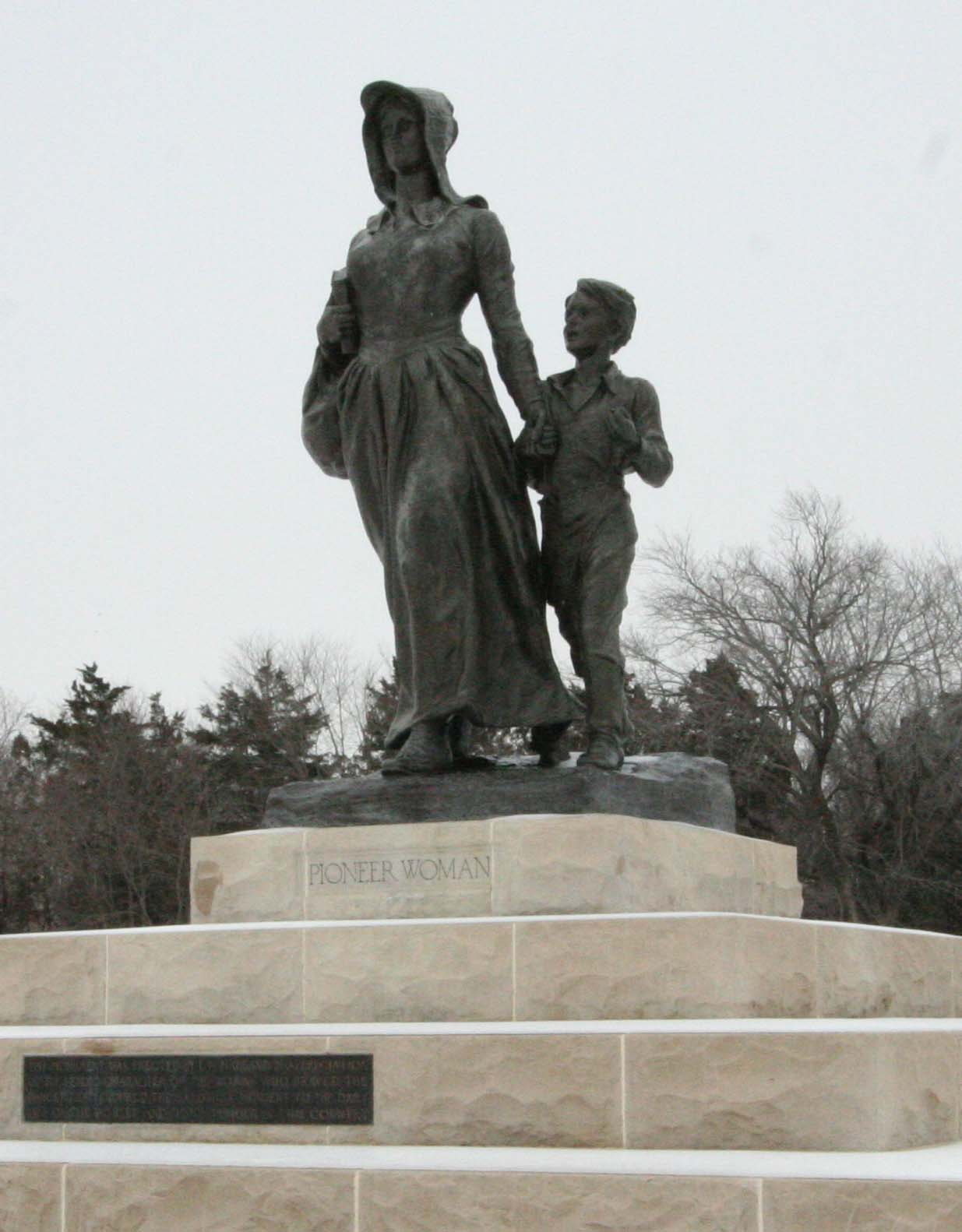
The Pioneer Woman statue in Ponca City, by Bryant Baker (1930).

Oklahoma is placed in the South by the United States Census Bureau, but other definitions place the state at least partly in the Southwest, Midwest, Upland South, and Great Plains. Oklahomans have a high rate of English, Scotch-Irish, German, and Native American ancestry, with 25 different Indigenous languages spoken in the state.

Because many American Indians were forced to move to Indian territory (modern day Oklahoma) when American settlement within North America had increased, Oklahoma has much linguistic diversity. Mary Linn, an associate professor of anthropology at the University of Oklahoma and the associate curator of Native American languages at the Sam Noble Museum, notes Oklahoma also has high levels of language endangerment.

Sixty-seven Native American tribes and bands are represented in Oklahoma, including 38 federally recognized tribes, who are headquartered and have tribal jurisdictional areas or Indian reservations in the state. Native American tribes, Western ranchers, Southern settlers, and Eastern oil barons have shaped the state's cultural predisposition, and its largest cities have been named among the most underrated cultural destinations in the United States.

Residents of Oklahoma are associated with traits of Southern hospitality—the 2006 Catalogue for Philanthropy (with data from 2004) ranks Oklahomans 7th in the nation for overall generosity. The state has also been associated with a negative cultural stereotype first popularized by John Steinbeck's 1939 novel The Grapes of Wrath, which described the plight of uneducated, poverty-stricken Dust Bowl-era farmers deemed "Okies". While the term is often used in a positive manner by Oklahomans, it is still considered a derogatory term by many.

=== Arts ===
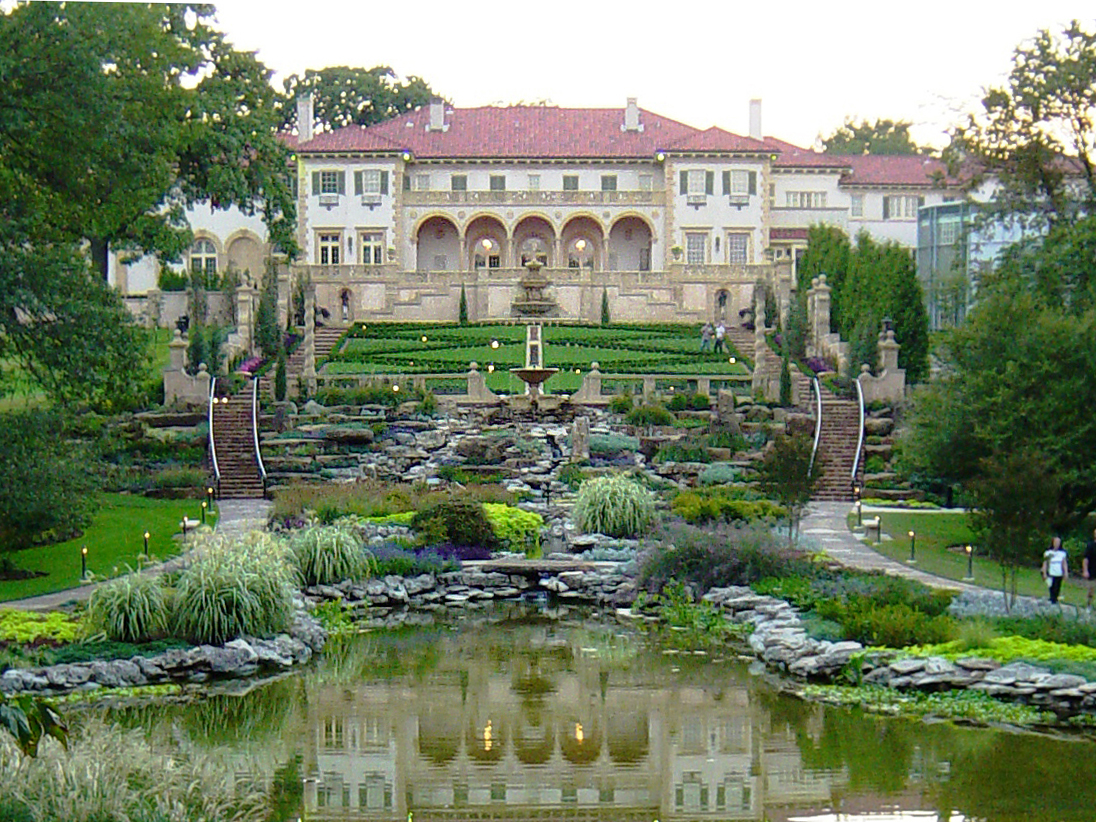
Philbrook Museum of Art, one of the nation's top fifty

In the state's largest urban areas, pockets of jazz culture flourish, and African American, Mexican American, and Asian American communities produce music and art of their respective cultures. The Oklahoma Mozart Festival in Bartlesville is one of the largest classical music festivals on the Southern Plains, and Oklahoma City's Festival of the Arts has been named one of the top fine arts festivals in the nation.

The state has a rich history in ballet with five Native American ballerinas attaining worldwide fame. These were Yvonne Chouteau, sisters Marjorie and Maria Tallchief, Rosella Hightower and Moscelyne Larkin, known collectively as the Five Moons. The New York Times rates the Tulsa Ballet as one of the top ballet companies in the United States. The Oklahoma City Ballet and University of Oklahoma's dance program were formed by ballerina Yvonne Chouteau and husband Miguel Terekhov. The university program was founded in 1962 and was the first fully accredited program of its kind in the United States.

In Sand Springs, an outdoor amphitheater called "Discoveryland!" (since closed) is the official performance headquarters for the musical Oklahoma! Ridge Bond, native of McAlester, Oklahoma, starred in the Broadway and International touring productions of Oklahoma!, playing the role of "Curly McClain" in more than 2,600 performances. In 1953 he was featured along with the Oklahoma! cast on a CBS Omnibus television broadcast. Bond was instrumental in the Oklahoma! title song becoming the Oklahoma state song and is also featured on the U.S. postage stamp commemorating the musical's 50th anniversary.

Historically, Oklahoma has produced musical styles such as The Tulsa Sound and western swing, which was popularized at Cain's Ballroom in Tulsa. The building, known as the "Carnegie Hall of Western Swing", served as the performance headquarters of Bob Wills and the Texas Playboys during the 1930s. Stillwater is known as the epicenter of Red Dirt music, the best-known proponent of which is the late Bob Childers.

Prominent theatre companies in Oklahoma include, in the capital city, Lyric Theatre of Oklahoma, Oklahoma City Theatre Company, Carpenter Square Theatre, Oklahoma Shakespeare in the Park, and CityRep. CityRep is a professional company affording equity points to those performers and technical theatre professionals. In Tulsa, Oklahoma's oldest resident professional company is American Theatre Company, and Theatre Tulsa is the oldest community theatre company west of the Mississippi. Other companies in Tulsa include Heller Theatre and Tulsa Spotlight Theater. The cities of Norman, Lawton, and Stillwater, among others, also host well-reviewed community theatre companies.

Oklahoma is in the nation's middle percentile in per capita spending on the arts, ranking 17th, and contains more than 300 museums. The Philbrook Museum of Tulsa is considered one of the top 50 fine art museums in the United States, and the Sam Noble Oklahoma Museum of Natural History in Norman, one of the largest university-based art and history museums in the country, documents the natural history of the region. The collections of Thomas Gilcrease are housed in the Gilcrease Museum of Tulsa, which also holds the world's largest, most comprehensive collection of art and artifacts of the American West.

The Egyptian art collection at the Mabee-Gerrer Museum of Art in Shawnee is considered to be the finest Egyptian collection between Chicago and Los Angeles. The Oklahoma City Museum of Art contains the most comprehensive collection of glass sculptures by artist Dale Chihuly in the world, and Oklahoma City's National Cowboy & Western Heritage Museum documents the heritage of the American Western frontier. With remnants of the Holocaust and artifacts relevant to Judaism, the Sherwin Miller Museum of Jewish Art of Tulsa preserves the largest collection of Jewish art in the Southwest United States.

=== Festivals and events ===
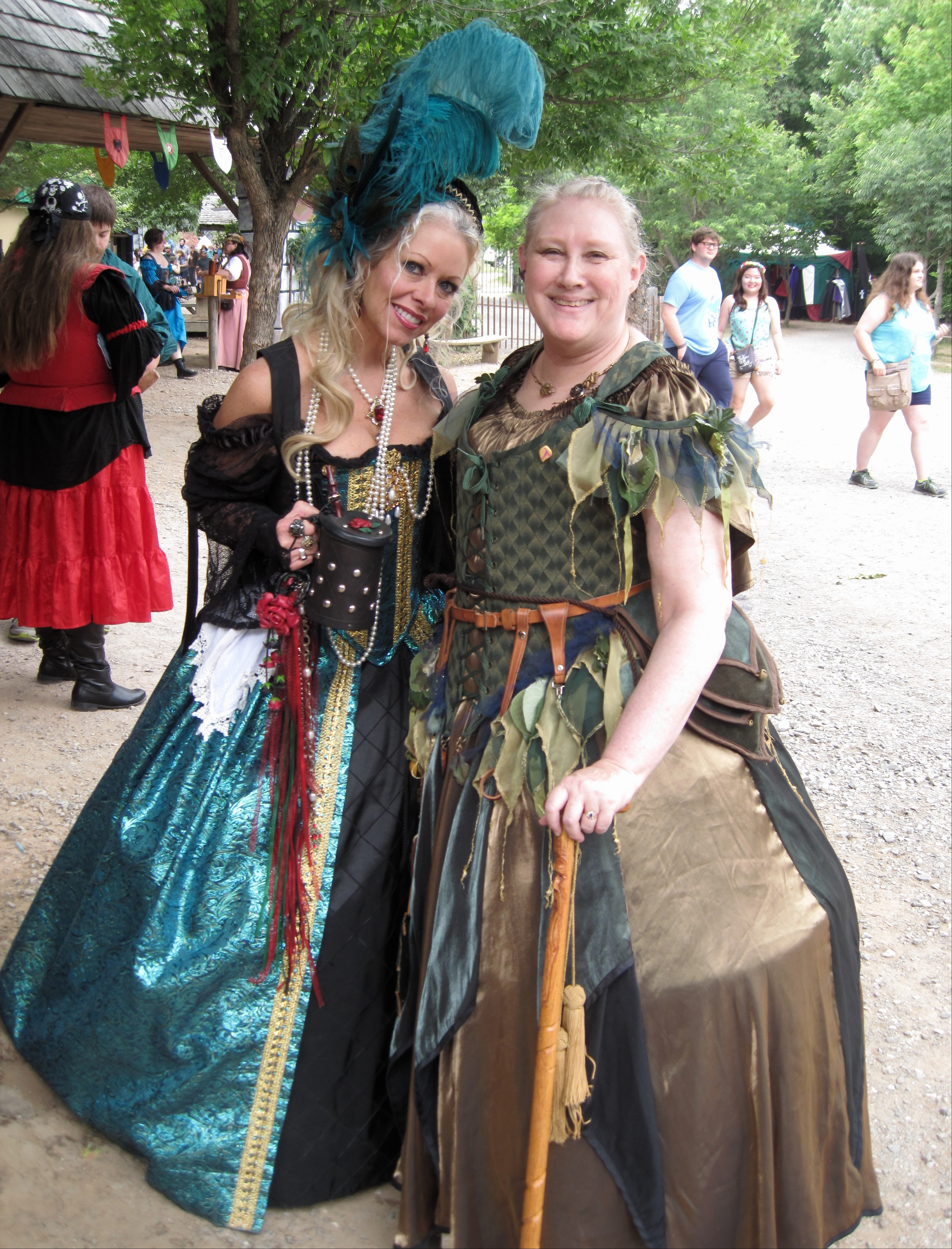
Oklahoma Renaissance Festival, 2017

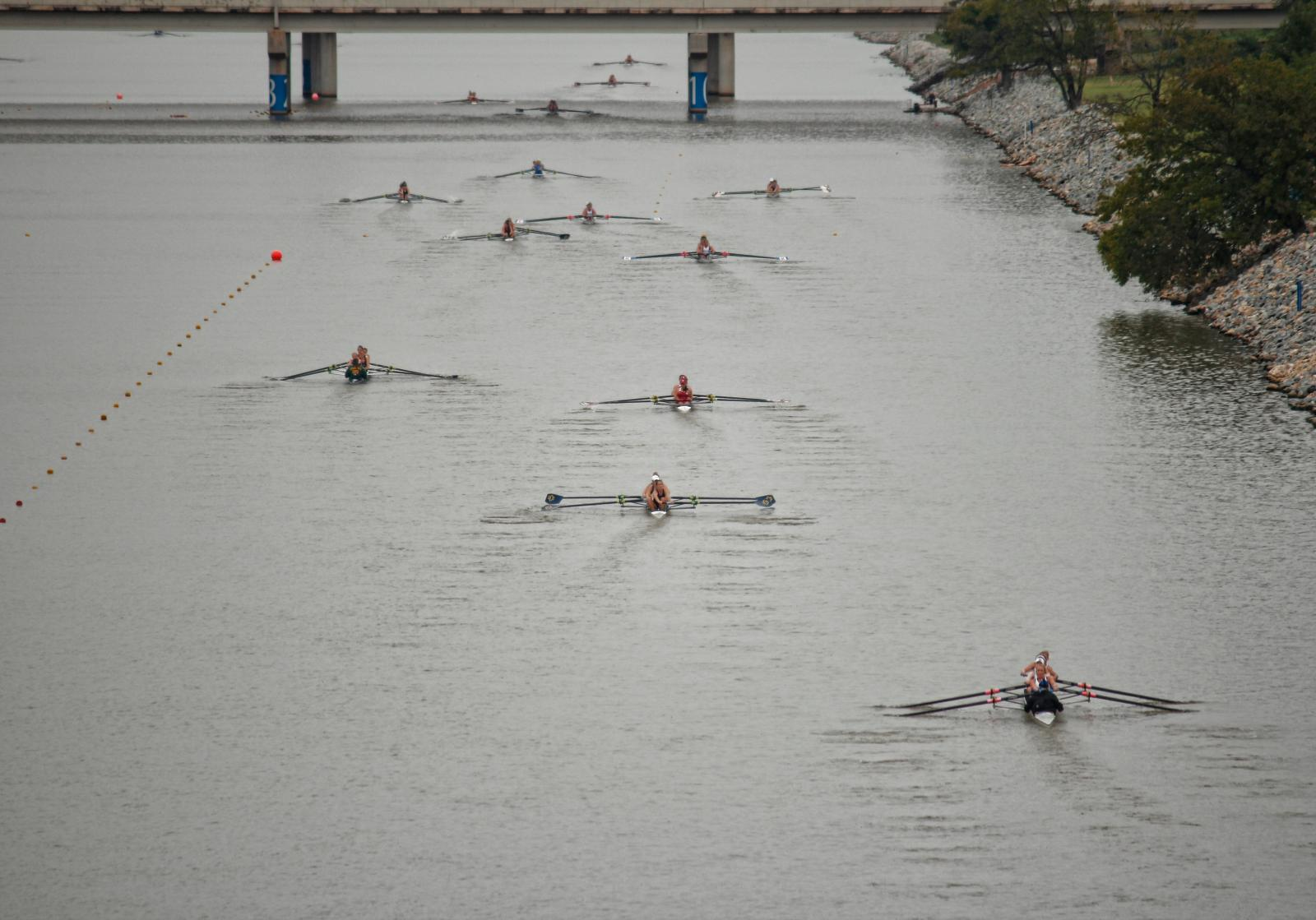
Oklahoma Regatta Festival on the North Canadian River, 2012

Oklahoma's centennial celebration was named the top event in the United States for 2007 by the American Bus Association, and consisted of multiple celebrations saving with the 100th anniversary of statehood on November 16, 2007. Annual ethnic festivals and events take place throughout the state such as ceremonial events, include festivals (as examples) in Scottish, Irish, German, Italian, Vietnamese, Chinese, Czech, Jewish, Arab, Mexican and African-American communities depicting cultural heritage or traditions.

Oklahoma City is home to a few reoccurring events and festivals. During a ten-day run in Oklahoma City, the State Fair of Oklahoma attracts roughly one million people along with the annual Festival of the Arts. Such as various Latin American and Asian heritage festivals, and cultural festivals such as the Juneteenth celebrations are held in Oklahoma City each year. The Oklahoma City Pride Parade has been held annually in late June since 1987 in the gay district of Oklahoma City on 39th and Penn. The First Friday Art Walk in the Paseo Arts District is an art appreciation festival held the first Friday of every month. Additionally, an annual art festival is held in the Paseo on Memorial Day Weekend.

The Tulsa State Fair attracts more than a million people each year during its ten-day run. The city also hosts the annual Mayfest festival which entertained more than 375,000 in four days during 2007. In 2006, Tulsa's annual Oktoberfest was named one of the top 10 in the world by USA Today.

Norman plays host to the Norman Music Festival, a festival that highlights native Oklahoma bands and musicians. Norman is also host to the Medieval Fair of Norman, which has been held annually since 1976 and was Oklahoma's first medieval fair. The Fair was held first on the south oval of the University of Oklahoma campus and in the third year moved to the Duck Pond in Norman until the Fair became too big and moved to Reaves Park in 2003. The Medieval Fair of Norman is Oklahoma's "largest weekend event and the third-largest event in Oklahoma, and was selected by Events Media Network as one of the top 100 events in the nation".

=== Sports ===
The Oklahoma City Thunder of the National Basketball Association (NBA) is the state's only major league sports franchise. The state had a team in the Women's National Basketball Association, the Tulsa Shock, from 2010 through 2015, but the team relocated to Dallas–Fort Worth after that season and became the Dallas Wings.

Oklahoma has teams in several minor leagues, including Minor League Baseball at the Triple-A and Double-A levels (the Oklahoma City Comets and Tulsa Drillers, respectively), hockey's ECHL with the Tulsa Oilers, and a number of indoor football leagues. In the last-named sport, the state's most notable team was the Tulsa Talons, which played in the Arena Football League until 2012, when the team was moved to San Antonio, Texas. The Oklahoma Defenders replaced the Talons as Tulsa's only professional arena football team, playing the CPIFL. The Oklahoma City Blue, of the NBA G League, relocated to Oklahoma City from Tulsa in 2014, where they were formerly known as the Tulsa 66ers. Tulsa is the base for the Tulsa Revolution, which plays in the American Indoor Soccer League. Enid and Lawton host professional basketball teams in the USBL and the CBA.

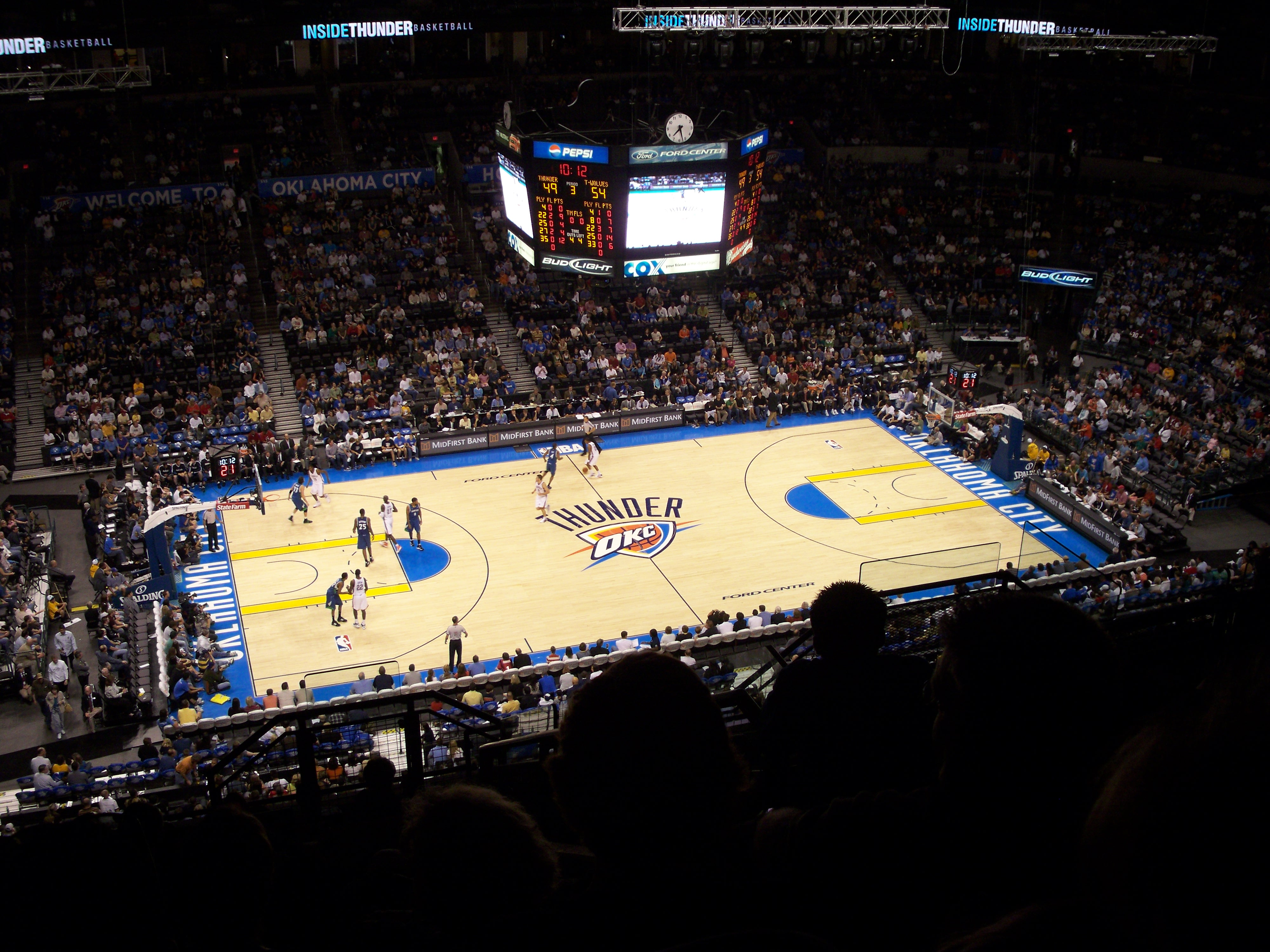
The Oklahoma City Thunder moved to Oklahoma City in 2008, becoming the state's first (and so far only) permanent major-league team in any sport.

Collegiate athletics are a popular draw in the state. The state has four schools that compete at the highest level of college sports, NCAA Division I. The Oklahoma Sooners participate in the Southeastern Conference, and the Oklahoma State Cowboys and Cowgirls participate in the Big 12 Conference. The Big 12 and SEC are two of the so-called Power Four conferences of the top tier of college football, Division I FBS. The Sooners and Cowboys average well over 50,000 fans attending their football games, and Oklahoma's football program ranked 12th in attendance among American colleges in 2010, with an average of 84,738 people attending its home games. The two universities meet several times each year in rivalry matches known as the Bedlam Series, which are some of the greatest sporting draws to the state. Sports Illustrated magazine rates Oklahoma and Oklahoma State among the top colleges for athletics in the nation.

Two private institutions in Tulsa, the University of Tulsa and Oral Roberts University; are also Division I members. Tulsa competes in FBS football and other sports in the American Athletic Conference, while Oral Roberts, which does not sponsor football, is a member of the Summit League. In addition, 12 of the state's smaller colleges and universities compete in NCAA Division II as members of three different conferences, and eight other Oklahoma institutions participate in the NAIA, mostly within the Sooner Athletic Conference.

Regular LPGA tournaments are held at Cedar Ridge Country Club in Tulsa, and major championships for the PGA or LPGA have been played at Southern Hills Country Club in Tulsa, Oak Tree Country Club in Oklahoma City, and Cedar Ridge Country Club in Tulsa. Rated one of the top golf courses in the nation, Southern Hills has hosted five PGA Championships, including one in 2022, and three U.S. Opens, the most recent in 2001. Rodeos are popular throughout the state, and Guymon, in the state's panhandle, hosts one of the largest in the nation.

ESPN called Oklahoma City "the center of the softball universe", specifically referring to the fast-pitch version, in a 2020 story. Oklahoma City is home to the governing body of the sport in the United States, USA Softball, which has its headquarters in a complex that also includes Devon Park. It annually hosts the Women's College World Series, the eight-team final round of the NCAA Division I softball tournament. Devon Park will host softball at the 2028 Summer Olympics, and the Riversport OKC complex will host canoe slalom at the Games.

College wrestling has strong tradition in Oklahoma. Oklahoma State has the most NCAA national championships of any collegiate team with 34, with the Oklahoma Sooners having 7 NCAA wrestling titles. The National Wrestling Hall of Fame and Museum is headquartered in Stillwater.

A teqball competition was held in Tulsa June 14–16, 2024.

==== Current professional teams ====
Basketball
Team	Type	League	Venue	City	Area (Metro/Region)
Oklahoma City Thunder	Men's Basketball	NBA	Paycom Center	Oklahoma City	OKC Metro
Oklahoma City Blue	Men's Basketball	NBA G League	Paycom Center	Oklahoma City	OKC Metro

Baseball
Team	Type	League	Venue	City	Area (Metro/Region)
Oklahoma City Comets	Baseball	PCL (Triple-A)	Chickasaw Bricktown Ballpark	Oklahoma City	OKC Metro
Tulsa Drillers	Baseball	TL (Double-A)	ONEOK Field	Tulsa	Tulsa Metro

Hockey
Team	Type	League	Venue	City	Area (Metro/Region)
Tulsa Oilers	Hockey	ECHL	BOK Center	Tulsa	Tulsa Metro

Football
Team	Type	League	Venue	City	Area (Metro/Region)
Tulsa Oilers	Indoor Football	IFL	BOK Center	Tulsa	
Oklahoma Thunder	Football	GDFL	Bixby High School	Bixby	Tulsa Metro
Oklahoma City Bounty Hunters	Football	GDFL	Putnam City Stadium	Warr Acres	OKC Metro

Soccer
Team	Type	League	Venue	City	Area (Metro/Region)
FC Tulsa	Men's Soccer	USL	ONEOK Field	Tulsa	Tulsa Metro
Tulsa Spirit	Women's Soccer	WPSL	Union 8th	Broken Arrow	Tulsa Metro
Oklahoma City FC	Women's Soccer	WPSL	Miller Stadium	Oklahoma City	OKC Metro
Oklahoma City Energy	Men's Soccer	USL	Taft Stadium	Oklahoma City	OKC Metro

Rugby
Team	Type	League	Venue	City	Area (Metro/Region)
Tulsa Rugby Club	Men's Rugby	Division II Rugby	Riverside Pitch	Tulsa	Tulsa Metro

== Health ==
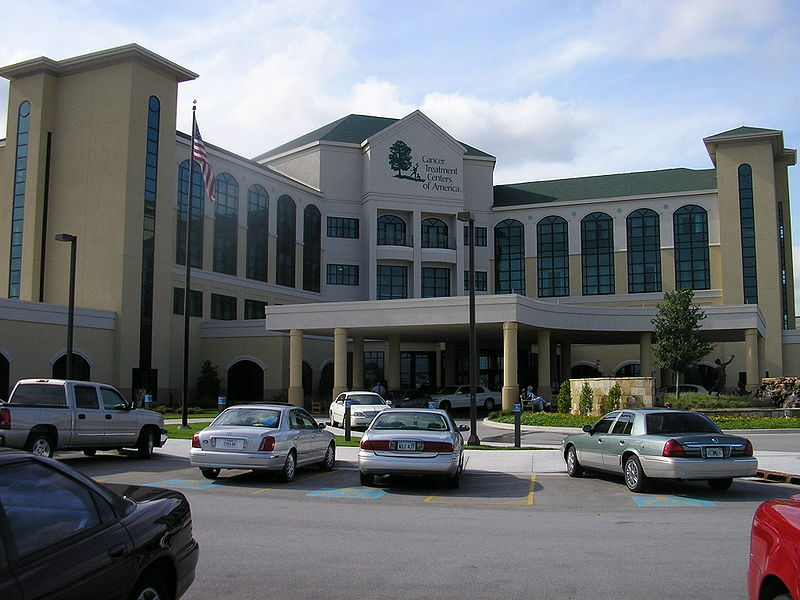
Cancer Treatment Centers of America at Southwestern Regional Medical Center, Tulsa

Oklahoma was the 21st-largest recipient of medical funding from the federal government in 2005, with health-related federal expenditures in the state totaling $75,801,364; immunizations, bioterrorism preparedness, and health education were the top three most funded medical items. Instances of major diseases are near the national average in Oklahoma, and the state ranks at or slightly above the rest of the country in percentage of people with asthma, diabetes, cancer, and hypertension.

In 2000, Oklahoma ranked 45th in physicians per capita and slightly below the national average in nurses per capita, but was slightly above the national average in hospital beds per 100,000 people and above the national average in net growth of health services over a twelve-year period. One of the worst states for percentage of insured people, nearly 25 percent of Oklahomans between the age of 18 and 64 did not have health insurance in 2005, the fifth-highest rate in the nation.

Oklahomans are in the upper half of Americans in terms of obesity prevalence. In 2009, Oklahoma was the 5th most obese in the nation, with 30.3 percent of its population at or near obesity. Oklahoma ranked last among the 50 states in a 2007 study by the Commonwealth Fund on health care performance.

The OU Medical Center, Oklahoma's largest collection of hospitals, is the only hospital in the state designated a Level I trauma center by the American College of Surgeons. OU Medical Center is on the grounds of the Oklahoma Health Center in Oklahoma City, the state's largest concentration of medical research facilities.

The Cancer Treatment Centers of America at Southwestern Regional Medical Center in Tulsa is one of four such regional facilities nationwide, offering cancer treatment to the entire southwestern United States, and is one of the largest cancer treatment hospitals in the country. The largest osteopathic teaching facility in the nation, Oklahoma State University Medical Center at Tulsa, also rates as one of the largest facilities in the field of neuroscience. On June 26, 2018, Oklahoma made marijuana legal for medical purposes, making it one of the most conservative states to approve medical marijuana.

=== Life expectancy ===
The residents of Oklahoma have a lower life expectancy than the U.S. national average. In 2014, males in Oklahoma lived an average of 73.7 years compared to a male national average of 76.7 years and females lived an average of 78.5 years compared to a female national average of 81.5 years. Increases in life expectancy have been below the national average. Male life expectancy in Oklahoma between 1980 and 2014, increased by an average of 4.0 years, compared to a male national average of a 6.7 year increase. Life expectancy for females in Oklahoma between 1980 and 2014, increased by 1.0 years, compared to a female national average of a 4.0 year increase.

Using 2016–2018 data, the Robert Wood Johnson Foundation calculated that life expectancy (all sexes) for Oklahoma counties ranged from 71.2 years for Okfuskee County to 79.7 years for Cimarron and Logan counties. Life expectancy for the state as a whole was 76.0 years.

=== Impact of COVID-19 ===
As of December 22, 2022, Oklahoma has been impacted more by the COVID-19 pandemic (2020–2023) than the average U.S. state. Statistics for the U.S. as a whole are 331 deaths per 100,000 population with 68 percent of the population fully vaccinated. The comparable statistics for Oklahoma are 405 deaths per 100,000 population with 59 percent of the population fully vaccinated; 16,041 deaths from COVID-19 have been recorded in Oklahoma. A wide variation in deaths from COVID-19 exists among Oklahoma counties. Greer County recorded the highest death rate of .00753 (753 deaths per 100,000 residents). Payne County recorded the lowest death rate of .00231 (231 deaths per 100,000 residents).

== Media ==
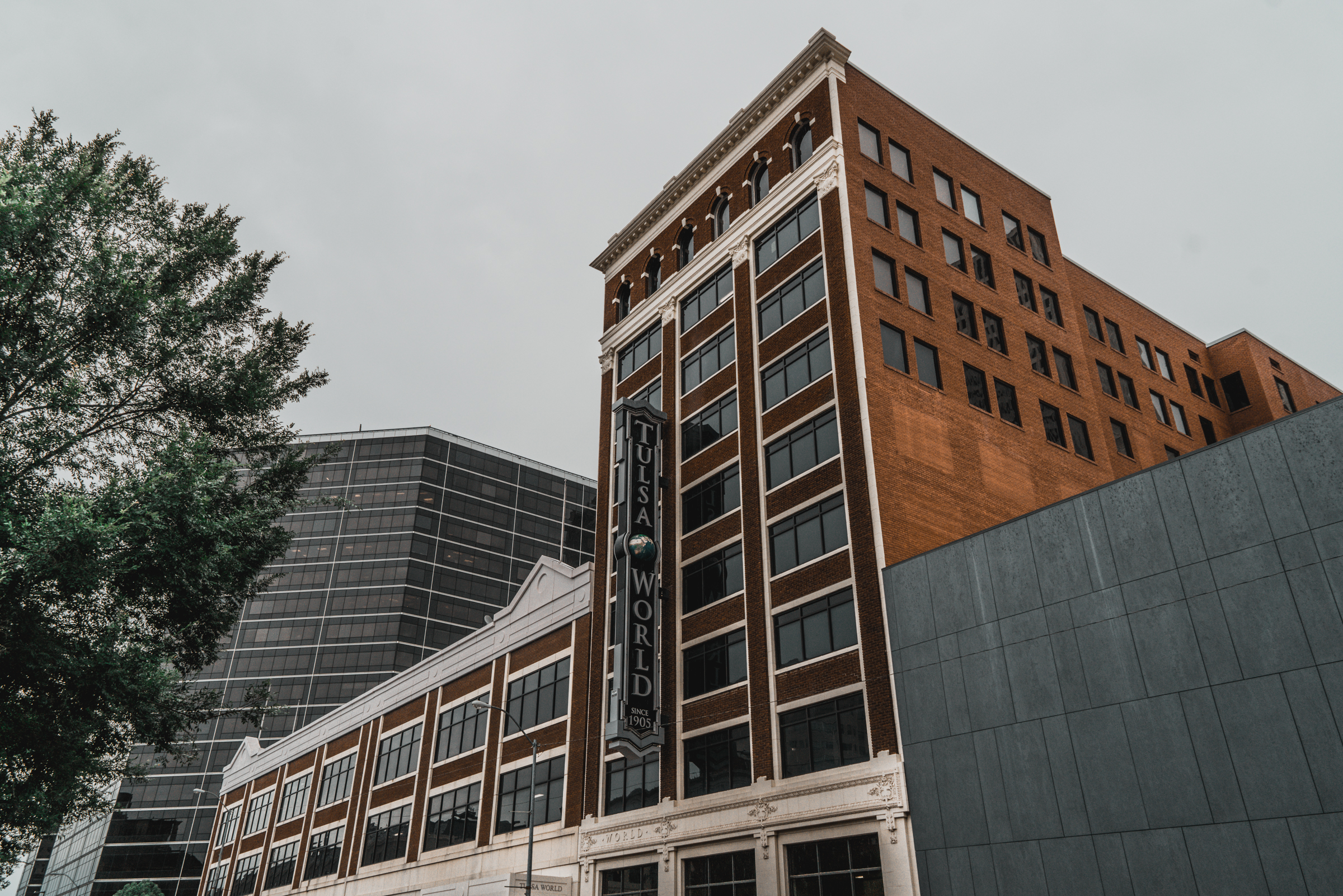
The second-largest newspaper in Oklahoma, the Tulsa World, has a circulation of 189,789.

Oklahoma City and Tulsa are the 45th- and 61st-largest media markets in the United States as ranked by Nielsen Media Research. The state's third-largest media market, Lawton-Wichita Falls, Texas, is ranked 149th nationally by the agency. Broadcast television in Oklahoma began in 1949 when KFOR-TV (then WKY-TV) in Oklahoma City and KOTV-TV in Tulsa began broadcasting a few months apart. Currently, all major American broadcast networks have affiliated television stations in the state.

Oklahoma has two primary newspapers. The Oklahoman, based in Oklahoma City, is the largest newspaper in the state and 54th-largest in the nation by circulation, with a weekday readership of 138,493 and a Sunday readership of 202,690. The Tulsa World, the second-most widely circulated newspaper in Oklahoma and 79th in the nation, holds a Sunday circulation of 132,969 and a weekday readership of 93,558. Oklahoma's first newspaper was established in 1844, called the Cherokee Advocate, and was written in both Cherokee and English. In 2006, there were more than 220 newspapers in the state, including 177 with weekly publications and 48 with daily publications.

Oklahoma's first radio station, WKY in Oklahoma City, began broadcasting in 1920. In 2006, there were more than 500 radio stations in Oklahoma broadcasting with various local or nationally owned networks. Five universities in Oklahoma operate non-commercial, public radio stations/networks.

Oklahoma has a few ethnic-oriented TV stations broadcasting in Spanish and Asian languages, and there is some Native American programming. TBN, a Christian religious television network, has a studio in Tulsa, and built its first entirely TBN-owned affiliate in Oklahoma City in 1980.

== Transportation ==
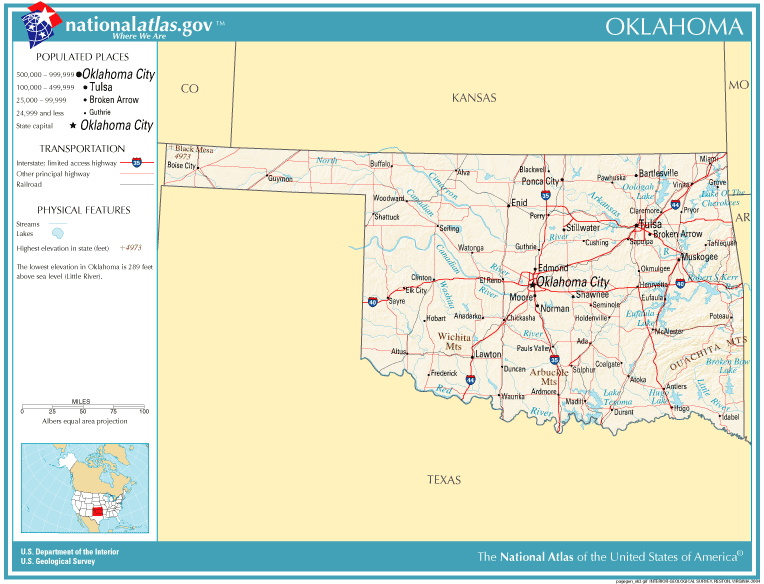
Road network and waterways of Oklahoma from the 1970 edition of the National Atlas

Transportation in Oklahoma is generated by an anchor system of Interstate Highways, inter-city rail lines, airports, inland ports, and mass transit networks. Situated along an integral point in the Interstate Highway system, Oklahoma contains three three primary and four auxiliary Interstate Highways. In Oklahoma City, Interstate 35 (I-35) intersects with I-44 and I-40, forming one of the most important intersections along the United States highway system.

More than 12,000 miles (19,000 km) of roads make up the state's major highway skeleton, including state-operated highways, ten turnpikes or major toll roads, and the longest drivable stretch of Route 66 in the nation. In 2008, I-44 in Oklahoma City was Oklahoma's busiest highway, with a daily traffic volume of 123,300 cars. In 2010, the state had the nation's third-highest number of bridges classified as structurally deficient, with nearly 5,212 bridges in disrepair, including 235 National Highway System bridges.

Oklahoma's largest commercial airport is Will Rogers World Airport in Oklahoma City, averaging a yearly passenger count of more than 3.5 million (1.7 million boardings) in 2010. Tulsa International Airport, the state's second-largest commercial airport, served more than 1.3 million boardings in 2010. Between the two, six airlines operate in Oklahoma. In terms of traffic, R. L. Jones Jr. (Riverside) Airport in Tulsa is the state's busiest airport, with 335,826 takeoffs and landings in 2008. Oklahoma has more than 150 public-use airports.

Oklahoma is connected to the nation's rail network via Amtrak's Heartland Flyer, its only regional passenger rail line. It currently stretches from Oklahoma City to Fort Worth, Texas. Lawmakers began seeking funding in early 2007 to connect the Heartland Flyer to Tulsa, but nothing came of this. In June 2023, following studies and negotiations, Oklahoma and Kansas state officials began seeking federal approval and funding to extend the Heartland Flyer from Oklahoma City to Newton, Kansas. The two locations are currently connected by an Amtrak Thruway Bus route that includes a stop in Wichita, Kansas. In November 2023, KDOT said the service would start in 2029 if approved, but could begin sooner were the project to be fast tracked.

Two inland ports on rivers serve Oklahoma: the Port of Muskogee and the Tulsa Port of Catoosa. The Tulsa Port of Catoosa is one of the United States' most inland international ports, at head of navigation of the McClellan–Kerr Arkansas River Navigation System, which connects barge traffic from Tulsa and Muskogee to the Mississippi River. The port ships over two million tons of goods annually and is a designated foreign trade zone.

Local transit map
Local Transit Systems (Only systems with fixed-route services are shown)

== Law and government ==
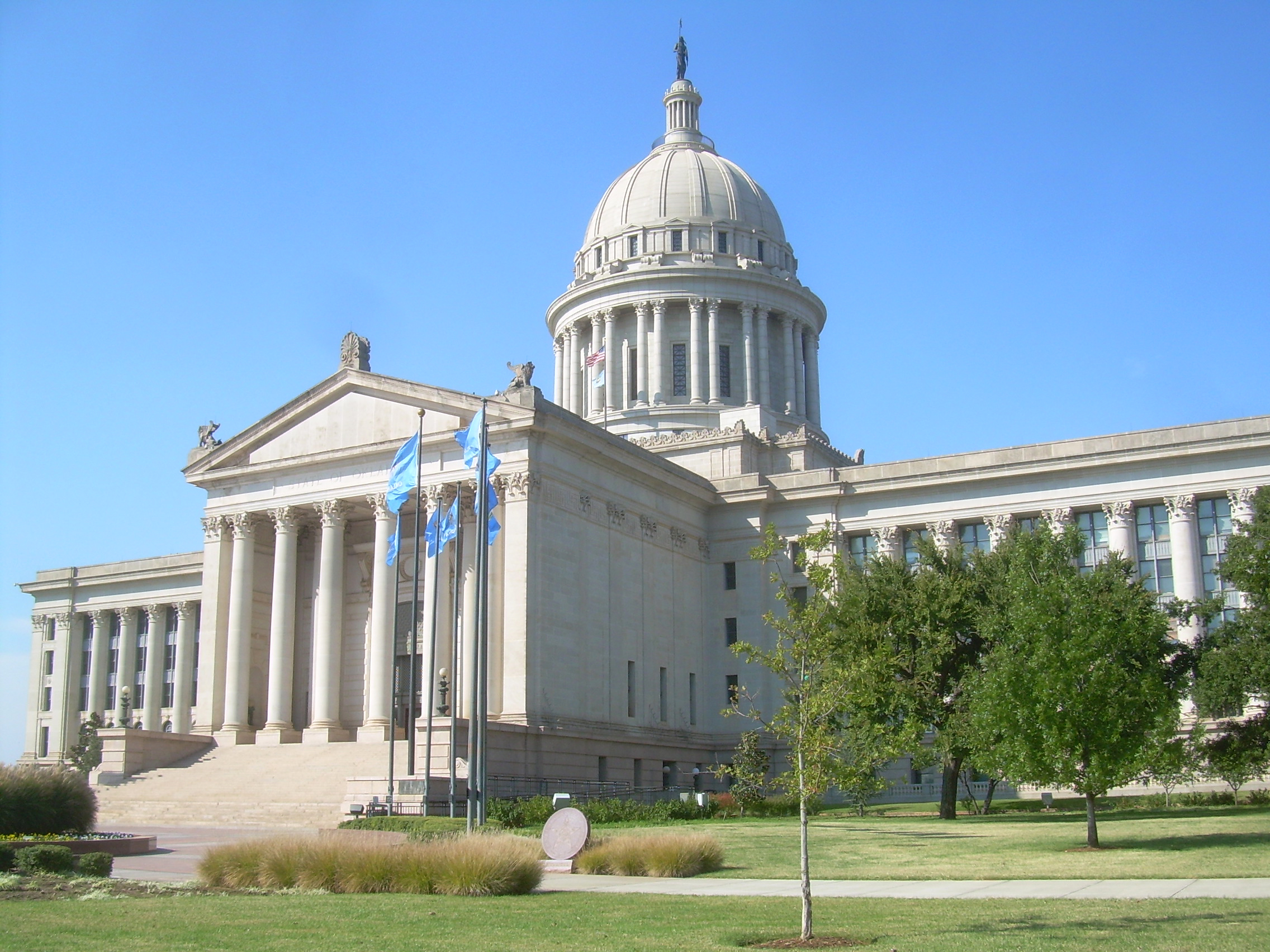
The Oklahoma State Capitol in Oklahoma City

Oklahoma is a constitutional republic with a government modeled after the federal government of the United States, with executive, legislative, and judicial branches. Oklahoma has 77 counties with jurisdiction over most local government functions within each respective domain, five congressional districts, and a voting base with a majority in the Republican Party. State officials are elected by plurality voting in the state of Oklahoma.

Oklahoma has capital punishment as a legal sentence. Between 1976 and mid-2011, Oklahoma had the highest per capita execution rate in the nation. Authorized methods of execution include the electric chair, the gas chamber and the firing squad.

In a 2020 study, Oklahoma was ranked as the 14th most difficult state for citizens to vote in. In May 2020, it became the first state to enact an anti–red flag law, prohibiting the acceptance of any grants or funding to enact red flag laws. Abortion in Oklahoma is illegal in nearly all circumstances.

=== State government ===
The Legislature of Oklahoma consists of the Senate and the House of Representatives. As the lawmaking branch of the state government, it is responsible for raising and distributing the money necessary to run the government. The Senate has 48 members serving four-year terms, while the House has 101 members with two-year terms. The state has a term limit for its legislature that restricts any one person to twelve cumulative years service between both legislative branches.

Oklahoma's judicial branch consists of the Oklahoma Supreme Court, the Oklahoma Court of Criminal Appeals, and 77 District Courts that each serve one county. The Oklahoma judiciary contains two independent courts: a Court of Impeachment for impeachment trials, and the Oklahoma Court on the Judiciary. Oklahoma has two courts of last resort: the state Supreme Court hears civil cases, and the state Court of Criminal Appeals hears criminal cases. This split system exists only in Oklahoma and neighboring Texas. Judges of those two courts, as well as the Court of Civil Appeals are appointed by the governor upon the recommendation of the state Judicial Nominating Commission, and are subject to a non-partisan retention vote on a six-year rotating schedule.

The executive branch consists of the governor, their staff, and other elected officials. The principal head of government, the governor is the chief executive of the Oklahoma executive branch. He serves as the ex officio Commander-in-chief of the Oklahoma National Guard when not called into Federal use and reserving the power to veto bills passed through the legislature. The responsibilities of the Executive branch include submitting the budget, ensuring state laws are enforced, and ensuring peace within the state is preserved.

=== Local government ===
Oklahoma is divided into 77 counties that govern locally, each headed by a three-member council of elected commissioners, a tax assessor, clerk, court clerk, treasurer, and sheriff. Each municipality operates as a separate and independent local government with executive, legislative and judicial power. County governments maintain jurisdiction over both incorporated cities and non-incorporated areas within their boundaries, and have executive power but no legislative or judicial power.

Both county and municipal governments collect taxes, employ a separate police force, hold elections, and operate emergency response services within their jurisdiction. Other local government units include school districts, technology center districts, community college districts, rural fire departments, rural water districts, and other special use districts.

Thirty-nine Native American tribal governments are based in Oklahoma, each holding limited powers within designated areas. While Indian reservations are typical in most of the United States, they are not present in Oklahoma. Tribal governments hold land granted during the Indian Territory era, but with limited jurisdiction, and no control over state governing bodies such as municipalities and counties. Tribal governments are recognized by the United States as quasi-sovereign entities with executive, judicial, and legislative powers over tribal members and functions, but are subject to the authority of the United States Congress to revoke or withhold certain powers. The tribal governments are required to submit a constitution and any subsequent amendments to the United States Congress for approval.

Oklahoma has 11 substate districts, including the two large Councils of Governments, INCOG in Tulsa (Indian Nations Council of Governments) and ACOG (Association of Central Oklahoma Governments).

=== National politics ===
During the first half-century of statehood, Oklahoma was considered a Democratic stronghold, being carried by the Republican Party in only two presidential elections, 1920 and 1928. After the 1948 election, the state turned firmly Republican. Although registered Republicans were a minority in the state until 2015, Oklahoma has been carried by Republican presidential candidates in all but one election since 1952: Lyndon B. Johnson's 1964 landslide victory.

Every single county in Oklahoma has been won by the Republican candidate in each election since 2004. Oklahoma was the only state where Barack Obama failed to carry any counties in 2008. Oklahoma City was the largest city in the United States carried by Republican Donald Trump in both the 2016 and 2020 elections.

Democrats are strongest in urban areas, such as the inner parts of Oklahoma City and Tulsa, as well as the college towns of Norman and Stillwater, and areas which are most heavily African American. The Democrats once held dominance in the eastern part of Oklahoma and Little Dixie before the area gradually shifted Republican in the late 2000s. As of the 2020 election, Native American voters, 16% of the state's population, are split, with urban populations supporting the Democrats, and rural reservation populaces favoring the Republicans.

Following the 2000 census, the Oklahoma delegation to the U.S. House of Representatives was reduced from six to five representatives, each serving one congressional district. Oklahoma has had an all-Republican congressional delegation since 2021 and previously from 2013 to 2019.

Voter registration and party enrollment as of December 31, 2025:
Party	Number of voters	Percentage
Republican	1,280,561	53.31%
Democratic	608,545	25.33%
Libertarian	23,296	0.97%
No affiliation/Other	489,825	20.39%
Total	2,402,227	100.00%

== State symbols ==
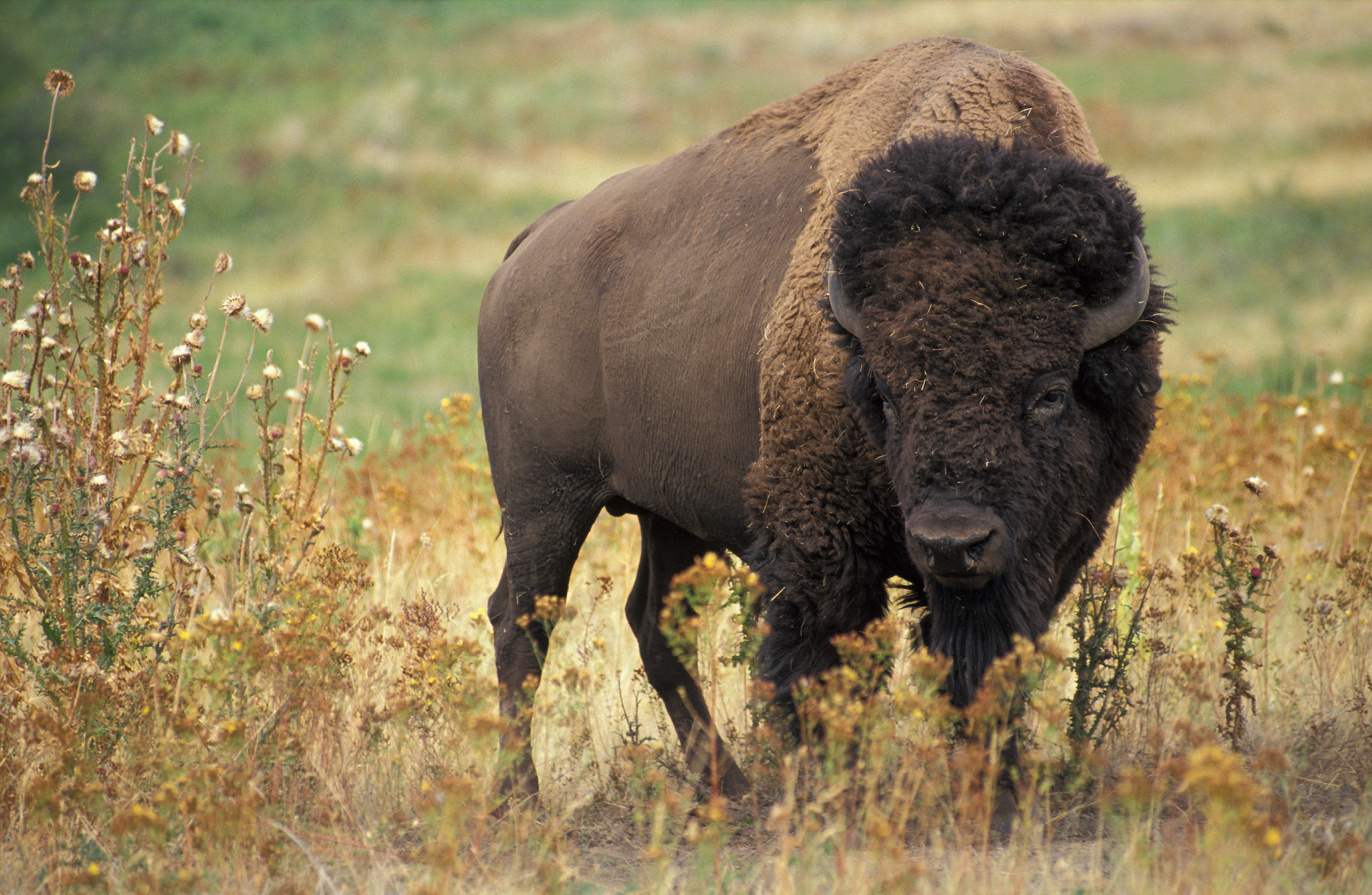
The American bison is Oklahoma's state mammal.

State law codifies Oklahoma's state emblems and honorary positions. The Oklahoma Senate or House of Representatives may adopt resolutions designating others for special events and to benefit organizations. In 2012 the House passed HCR 1024, which would change the state motto from "Labor Omnia Vincit" to "Oklahoma—In God We Trust!". The author of the resolution stated a constituent researched the Oklahoma Constitution and found no "official" vote regarding "Labor Omnia Vincit", therefore opening the door for an entirely new motto.

== See also ==
- Index of Oklahoma-related articles
- Outline of Oklahoma
- Zodletone Mountain

== Notes ==
Preceded by Utah	List of U.S. states by date of statehood Admitted on November 16, 1907 (46th)	Succeeded by New Mexico
