= Index of Oklahoma-related articles =

The location of the state of Oklahoma in the United States of America

The following is an alphabetical list of articles related to the U.S. state of Oklahoma.

== 0–9 ==
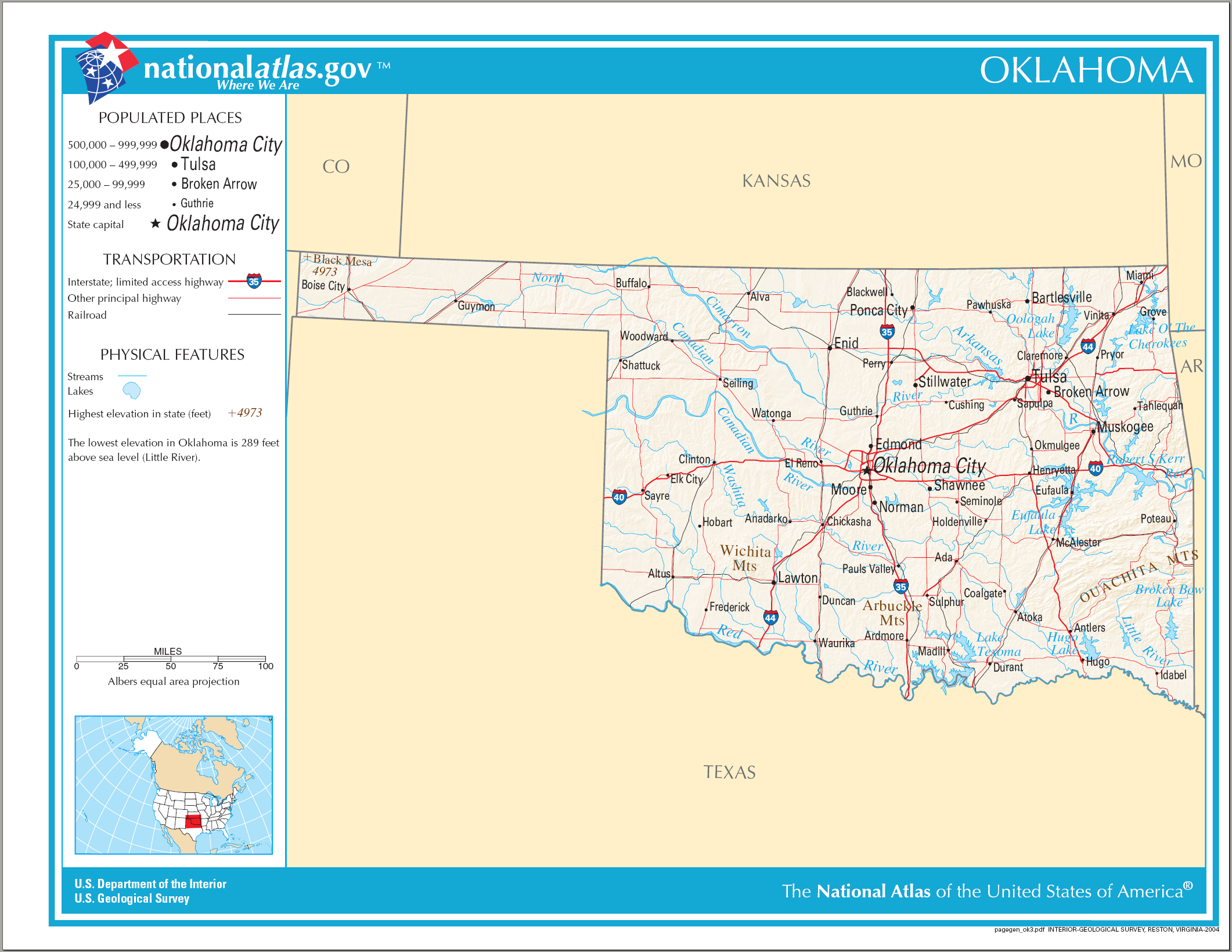
An enlargeable map of the state of Oklahoma

- .ok.us – Internet second-level domain for the state of Oklahoma
- 46th state to join the United States of America

== A ==
- Adams-Onís Treaty of 1819
- Adjacent states:
  - State of Arkansas
  - State of Colorado
  - State of Kansas
  - State of Missouri
  - State of New Mexico
  - State of Texas
- Agriculture in Oklahoma
- Airports in Oklahoma
- Amusement parks in Oklahoma
- Aquaria in Oklahoma
  - commons:Category:Aquaria in Oklahoma
- Arboreta in Oklahoma
  - commons:Category:Arboreta in Oklahoma
- Archaeology of Oklahoma
  - Category:Archaeological sites in Oklahoma
    - commons:Category:Archaeological sites in Oklahoma
- Architecture of Oklahoma
- Area codes in Oklahoma
- Art museums and galleries in Oklahoma
  - commons:Category:Art museums and galleries in Oklahoma
- Astronomical observatories in Oklahoma
  - commons:Category:Astronomical observatories in Oklahoma
- Attorney General of the State of Oklahoma

== B ==
- Botanical gardens in Oklahoma
  - commons:Category:Botanical gardens in Oklahoma
- Buildings and structures in Oklahoma
  - commons:Category:Buildings and structures in Oklahoma

== C ==
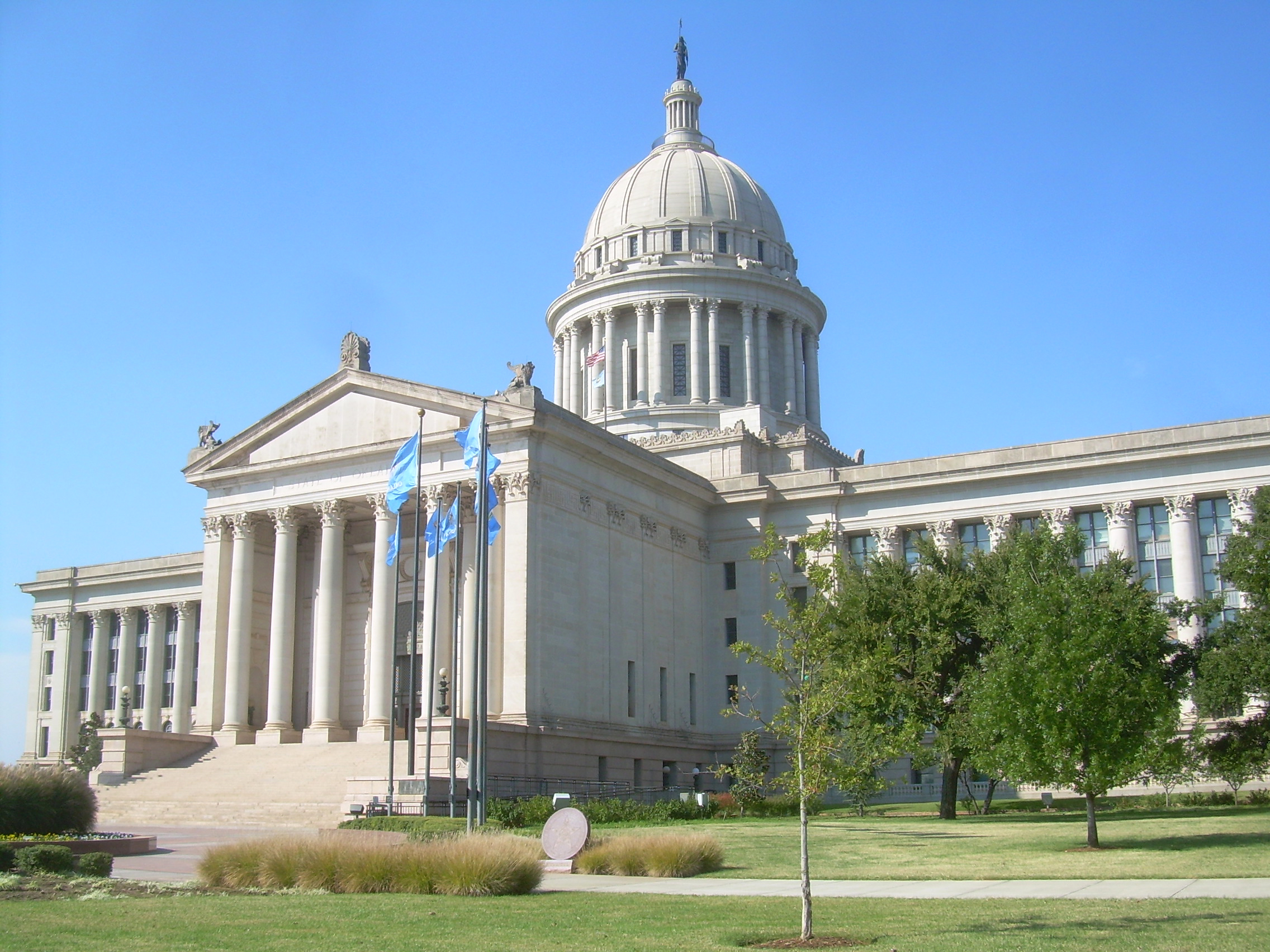
The Oklahoma State Capitol in Oklahoma City

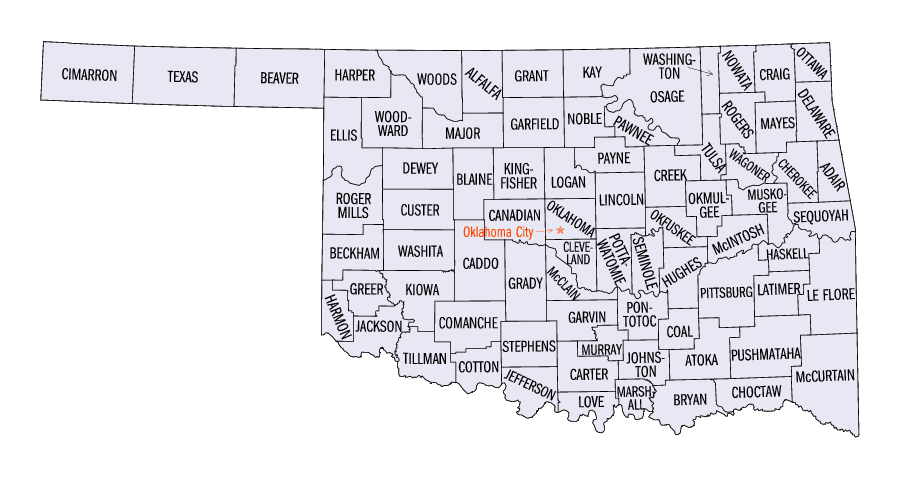
An enlargeable map of the 77 counties of the State of Oklahoma

- Capital of the State of Oklahoma
- Capitol of the State of Oklahoma
  - commons:Category:Oklahoma State Capitol
- Casinos in Oklahoma
- Caves of Oklahoma
  - commons:Category:Caves of Oklahoma
- Census statistical areas of Oklahoma
- Cities in Oklahoma
  - commons:Category:Cities in Oklahoma
- Climate of Oklahoma
- Colleges and universities in Oklahoma
  - commons:Category:Universities and colleges in Oklahoma
- Communications in Oklahoma
  - commons:Category:Communications in Oklahoma
- Companies in Oklahoma
- Congressional districts of Oklahoma
- Constitution of the State of Oklahoma
- Convention centers in Oklahoma
  - commons:Category:Convention centers in Oklahoma
- Counties of the State of Oklahoma
  - commons:Category:Counties in Oklahoma
- COVID-19 pandemic in Oklahoma
- Culture of Oklahoma
  - Category:Culture of Oklahoma
    - commons:Category:Oklahoma culture

== D ==
- Democratic Party of Oklahoma
- Demographics of Oklahoma

== E ==
- Economy of Oklahoma
  - Category:Economy of Oklahoma
    - commons:Category:Economy of Oklahoma
- Education in Oklahoma
  - Category:Education in Oklahoma
    - commons:Category:Education in Oklahoma
- Elections in Oklahoma
  - Category:Elections in Oklahoma
    - commons:Category:Elections in Oklahoma
- Category:Environment of Oklahoma
  - commons:Category:Environment of Oklahoma

== F ==
The Flag of the State of Oklahoma

- Flag of the State of Oklahoma
- Former highway routes in Oklahoma
- Forts in Oklahoma
  - Category:Forts in Oklahoma
    - commons:Category:Forts in Oklahoma

== G ==
- Geography of Oklahoma
  - Category:Geography of Oklahoma
    - commons:Category:Geography of Oklahoma
- Geology of Oklahoma
  - Category:Geology of Oklahoma
    - commons:Category:Geology of Oklahoma
- Ghost towns in Oklahoma
  - Category:Ghost towns in Oklahoma
    - commons:Category:Ghost towns in Oklahoma
- Golf clubs and courses in Oklahoma
- Government of the State of Oklahoma website
  - Category:Government of Oklahoma
    - commons:Category:Government of Oklahoma
- Governor of the State of Oklahoma
  - List of governors of Oklahoma
- Great Seal of the State of Oklahoma
- Guthrie, Oklahoma, territorial and state capital 1889-1910

== H ==
- Heritage railroads in Oklahoma
  - commons:Category:Heritage railroads in Oklahoma
- High schools of Oklahoma
- Higher education in Oklahoma
- Highway routes in Oklahoma
- Hiking trails in Oklahoma
  - commons:Category:Hiking trails in Oklahoma
- History of Oklahoma
  - Historical outline of Oklahoma
- Hospitals in Oklahoma
- House of Representatives of the State of Oklahoma

== I ==
- Images of Oklahoma
  - commons:Category:Oklahoma
- Indian Territory, 1834–1907

== L ==
- Lakes in Oklahoma
  - Category:Lakes of Oklahoma
    - commons:Category:Lakes of Oklahoma
- Landmarks in Oklahoma
  - commons:Category:Landmarks in Oklahoma
- Libertarian Party of Oklahoma
- Lieutenant Governor of the State of Oklahoma
- Lists related to the State of Oklahoma:
  - List of airports in Oklahoma
  - List of census-designated places in Oklahoma
  - List of census statistical areas in Oklahoma
  - List of cities in Oklahoma
  - List of colleges and universities in Oklahoma
  - List of counties in Oklahoma
  - List of earthquakes in Oklahoma
  - List of former highway routes in Oklahoma
  - List of forts in Oklahoma
  - List of ghost towns in Oklahoma
  - List of governors of Oklahoma
  - List of high schools in Oklahoma
  - List of highway routes in Oklahoma
  - List of hospitals in Oklahoma
  - List of individuals executed in Oklahoma
  - List of lakes in Oklahoma
  - List of law enforcement agencies in Oklahoma
  - List of museums in Oklahoma
  - List of National Historic Landmarks in Oklahoma
  - List of newspapers in Oklahoma
  - List of people from Oklahoma
  - List of radio stations in Oklahoma
  - List of railroads in Oklahoma
  - List of Registered Historic Places in Oklahoma
  - List of rivers of Oklahoma
  - List of school districts in Oklahoma
  - List of state parks in Oklahoma
  - List of state prisons in Oklahoma
  - List of symbols of the State of Oklahoma
  - List of telephone area codes in Oklahoma
  - List of television stations in Oklahoma
  - List of towns in Oklahoma
  - List of Oklahoma's congressional delegations
  - List of United States congressional districts in Oklahoma
  - List of United States representatives from Oklahoma
  - List of United States senators from Oklahoma
  - Louisiana Purchase of 1803

== M ==
- Maps of Oklahoma
- Mass media in Oklahoma
- Monuments and memorials in Oklahoma
  - commons:Category:Monuments and memorials in Oklahoma
- Mountains of Oklahoma
  - commons:Category:Mountains of Oklahoma
- Museums in Oklahoma
  - Category:Museums in Oklahoma
    - commons:Category:Museums in Oklahoma
- Music of Oklahoma
  - Category:Music of Oklahoma
    - commons:Category:Music of Oklahoma
  - Category:Musical groups from Oklahoma
  - Category:Musicians from Oklahoma

== N ==
- National forests of Oklahoma
  - commons:Category:National Forests of Oklahoma
- Natural history of Oklahoma
  - commons:Category:Natural history of Oklahoma
- Newspapers of Oklahoma

== O ==
- OK – United States Postal Service postal code for the State of Oklahoma
- Oklahoma website
  - Category:Oklahoma
    - commons:Category:Oklahoma
      - commons:Category:Maps of Oklahoma
- Oklahoma Ballot State Question 790
- Oklahoma City, state capital since 1910
  - Category:Oklahoma City
  - commons:Category:Oklahoma City, Oklahoma
- Oklahoma Club Collegiate Soccer League
- Oklahoma CyberKnife
- Oklahoma Native Plant Society
- Oklahoma Right To Farm SQ 777
- Oklahoma State Capitol
- Oklahoma Territory
- Oklahomans for Children and Families
- Outdoor sculptures in Oklahoma
  - commons:Category:Outdoor sculptures in Oklahoma

== P ==
- People from Oklahoma
  - Category:People from Oklahoma
    - commons:Category:People from Oklahoma
    - Category:People from Oklahoma by populated place
    - Category:People from Oklahoma by county
    - Category:People from Oklahoma by occupation
- Politics of Oklahoma
  - Category:Politics of Oklahoma
    - commons:Category:Politics of Oklahoma
  - Libertarian Party of Oklahoma
  - Oklahoma Democratic Party
  - Oklahoma Republican Party
  - Socialist Party of Oklahoma
- Protected areas of Oklahoma
  - commons:Category:Protected areas of Oklahoma

== R ==
- Radio stations in Oklahoma
- Railroad museums in Oklahoma
  - commons:Category:Railroad museums in Oklahoma
- Railroads in Oklahoma
- Registered historic places in Oklahoma
  - commons:Category:Registered Historic Places in Oklahoma
- Religion in Oklahoma
  - Category:Religion in Oklahoma
    - commons:Category:Religion in Oklahoma
- Republican Party of Oklahoma
- Rivers of Oklahoma
  - commons:Category:Rivers of Oklahoma

== S ==
- School districts of Oklahoma
- Scouting in Oklahoma
- Senate of the State of Oklahoma
- Settlements in Oklahoma
  - Cities in Oklahoma
  - Towns in Oklahoma
  - Census Designated Places in Oklahoma
  - Other unincorporated communities in Oklahoma
  - List of ghost towns in Oklahoma
- Socialist Party of Oklahoma
- Sports in Oklahoma
  - Category:Sports in Oklahoma
    - commons:Category:Sports in Oklahoma
  - Category:Sports venues in Oklahoma
    - commons:Category:Sports venues in Oklahoma
- State Capitol of Oklahoma
- State of Oklahoma website
  - Constitution of the State of Oklahoma
  - Government of the State of Oklahoma
    - Category:Government of Oklahoma
      - commons:Category:Government of Oklahoma
  - Executive branch of the government of the State of Oklahoma
    - Governor of the State of Oklahoma
  - Legislative branch of the government of the State of Oklahoma
    - Legislature of the State of Oklahoma
      - Senate of the State of Oklahoma
      - House of Representatives of the State of Oklahoma
  - Judicial branch of the government of the State of Oklahoma
    - Supreme Court of the State of Oklahoma
- State parks of Oklahoma
  - commons:Category:State parks of Oklahoma
- State prisons of Oklahoma
- Structures in Oklahoma
  - commons:Category:Buildings and structures in Oklahoma
- Supreme Court of the State of Oklahoma
- Symbols of the State of Oklahoma
  - Category:Symbols of Oklahoma
    - commons:Category:Symbols of Oklahoma

== T ==
- Telecommunications in Oklahoma
  - commons:Category:Communications in Oklahoma
- Telephone area codes in Oklahoma
- Television shows set in Oklahoma
- Television stations in Oklahoma
- Territory of Arkansas, (1819–1828)-1836
- Territory of Louisiana, 1805–1812
- Territory of Missouri, (1812–1819)-1821
- Territory of Oklahoma, 1890–1907
- Theatres in Oklahoma
  - commons:Category:Theatres in Oklahoma
- Tourism in Oklahoma website
  - commons:Category:Tourism in Oklahoma
- Towns in Oklahoma
  - commons:Category:Cities in Oklahoma
- Trail of Tears, 1830–1838
- Transportation in Oklahoma
  - Category:Transportation in Oklahoma
    - commons:Category:Transport in Oklahoma
- Treaty of Guadalupe Hidalgo of 1848
- Tulsa, Oklahoma
  - Category:Tulsa, Oklahoma
    - commons:Category:Tulsa, Oklahoma
- Tulsa race massacre

== U ==
- United States of America
  - States of the United States of America
  - United States census statistical areas of Oklahoma
  - Oklahoma's congressional delegations
  - United States congressional districts in Oklahoma
  - United States Court of Appeals for the Tenth Circuit
  - United States District Court for the Eastern District of Oklahoma
  - United States District Court for the Northern District of Oklahoma
  - United States District Court for the Western District of Oklahoma
  - United States representatives from Oklahoma
  - United States senators from Oklahoma
- Universities and colleges in Oklahoma
  - commons:Category:Universities and colleges in Oklahoma
- US-OK – ISO 3166-2:US region code for the State of Oklahoma

== V ==
  - Vian, Oklahoma
  - Vinita, Oklahoma

== W ==
- Water parks in Oklahoma
- Waterfalls of Oklahoma
  - commons:Category:Waterfalls of Oklahoma
  Wikimedia
  - Wikimedia Commons:Category:Oklahoma
    - commons:Category:Maps of Oklahoma
  - Wikinews:Category:Oklahoma
    - Wikinews:Portal:Oklahoma
  - Wikipedia Category:Oklahoma
    - Wikipedia Portal:Oklahoma
    - Wikipedia:WikiProject Oklahoma
      - Category:WikiProject Oklahoma articles
      - Wikipedia:WikiProject Oklahoma#Participants

== Z ==
- Zoos in Oklahoma
  - commons:Category:Zoos in Oklahoma

== See also ==
- Topic overview:
  - Oklahoma
  - Outline of Oklahoma
