= Outline of Oklahoma =

Overview of and topical guide to Oklahoma

The flag of Oklahoma

The seal of Oklahoma

The location of the state of Oklahoma in the United States of America

The following outline is provided as an overview of and topical guide to the U.S. state of Oklahoma:

Oklahoma – state located in the South Central United States. Oklahoma is the 20th most extensive and the 28th most populous of the 50 United States. The state's name is derived from the Choctaw words okla and humma, meaning "red people". On November 16, 1907, Oklahoma became the 46th state to enter the union. Its residents are known as Oklahomans or, informally "Okies", and its capital and largest city is Oklahoma City. A major producer of natural gas, oil, and agricultural products, Oklahoma relies on an economic base of aviation, energy, telecommunications, and biotechnology.

== General reference ==
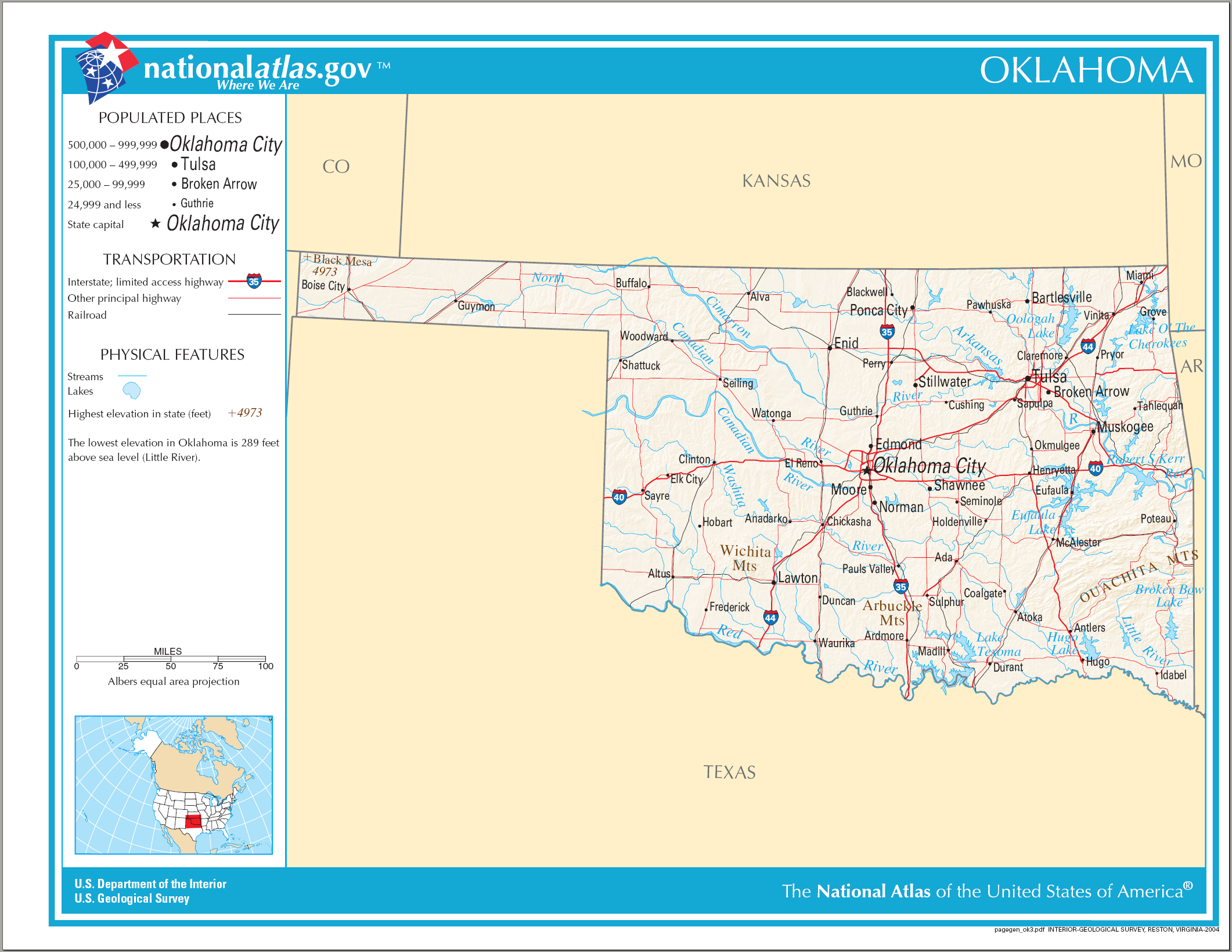
An enlargeable map of the state of Oklahoma

- Names
  - Common name: Oklahoma
    - Pronunciation: /ˌoʊkləˈhoʊmə/
  - Official name: State of Oklahoma
  - Abbreviations and name codes
    - Postal symbol: OK
    - ISO 3166-2 code: US-OK
    - Internet second-level domain: .ok.us
  - Nicknames
    - Native America (currently used on license plates)
    - Land of the Red Man
    - Sooner State
- Adjectival: Oklahoma
- Demonyms:
  - Oklahoman
  - Sooner (historic)
  - Boomer (historic)
  - Okie (archaic)

== Geography of Oklahoma ==
Geography of Oklahoma

- Oklahoma is: a U.S. state, a federal state of the United States of America
- Location
  - Northern Hemisphere
  - Western Hemisphere
    - Americas
      - North America
        - Anglo America
        - Northern America
          - United States of America
            - Contiguous United States
              - Western United States
                - Southwestern United States
              - Southern United States
                - South Central United States
- Population of Oklahoma: 3,751,351 (2010 U.S. Census)
- Area of Oklahoma: 69,699 sq mi (180,519 km^{2})
- Atlas of Oklahoma

=== Places in Oklahoma ===
- Historic places in Oklahoma
  - Abandoned communities in Oklahoma
    - Ghost towns in Oklahoma
  - National Historic Landmarks in Oklahoma
  - National Register of Historic Places listings in Oklahoma
    - Bridges on the National Register of Historic Places in Oklahoma
- National Natural Landmarks in Oklahoma
- National parks in Oklahoma
- State parks in Oklahoma

=== Environment of Oklahoma ===
- Climate of Oklahoma
- Geology of Oklahoma
- Superfund sites in Oklahoma
- Wildlife of Oklahoma
  - Fauna of Oklahoma
    - Birds of Oklahoma
    - Reptiles
      - Snakes of Oklahoma

==== Natural geographic features of Oklahoma ====
- Lakes of Oklahoma
- Rivers of Oklahoma

=== Regions of Oklahoma ===
- Central Oklahoma
- Eastern Oklahoma
- Northern Oklahoma
  - Northeastern Oklahoma
  - Northwestern Oklahoma
- Southern Oklahoma
  - Southeastern Oklahoma
  - Southwestern Oklahoma
- Western Oklahoma

==== Administrative divisions of Oklahoma ====
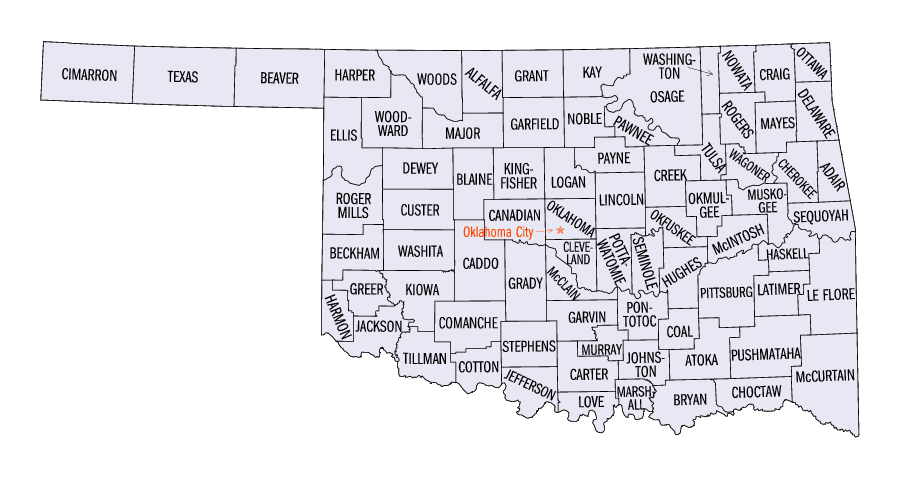
An enlargeable map of the 77 counties of the state of Oklahoma

- The 77 counties of the state of Oklahoma
  - Municipalities in Oklahoma
    - Cities in Oklahoma
      - State capital of Oklahoma: Oklahoma City
      - City nicknames in Oklahoma
    - Towns in Oklahoma
    - Unincorporated communities in Oklahoma
  - Census-designated places in Oklahoma

=== Demography of Oklahoma ===
Demographics of Oklahoma

== Government and politics of Oklahoma ==
Politics of Oklahoma

- Form of government: U.S. state government
- Oklahoma's congressional delegations
- Oklahoma State Capitol
- Elections in Oklahoma
- Political party strength in Oklahoma

=== Branches of the government of Oklahoma ===
Government of Oklahoma

==== Executive branch of the government of Oklahoma ====
- Governor of Oklahoma
  - Lieutenant Governor of Oklahoma
  - Secretary of State of Oklahoma
  - State Treasurer of Oklahoma
- State departments
  - Oklahoma Department of Transportation

==== Legislative branch of the government of Oklahoma ====
- Oklahoma Legislature (bicameral)
  - Upper house: Oklahoma Senate
  - Lower house: Oklahoma House of Representatives

==== Judicial branch of the government of Oklahoma ====
Courts of Oklahoma

- Supreme Court of Oklahoma

=== Law and order in Oklahoma ===
Law of Oklahoma

- Cannabis in Oklahoma
- Capital punishment in Oklahoma
  - Individuals executed in Oklahoma
- Constitution of Oklahoma
- Crime in Oklahoma
- Gun laws in Oklahoma
- Law enforcement in Oklahoma
  - Law enforcement agencies in Oklahoma
    - Oklahoma Highway Patrol

=== Military in Oklahoma ===
- Oklahoma Air National Guard
- Oklahoma Army National Guard

== History of Oklahoma ==
History of Oklahoma

=== History of Oklahoma, by period ===
- Indigenous peoples
- Spanish colony of Santa Fé de Nuevo Méjico, 1598–1821
- French colony of Louisiane, 1699–1764
  - Treaty of Fontainebleau of 1762
- Spanish (though predominantly Francophone) district of Alta Luisiana, 1764–1803
  - Third Treaty of San Ildefonso of 1800
- French district of Haute-Louisiane, 1803
  - Louisiana Purchase of 1803
- Unorganized U.S. territory created by the Louisiana Purchase, 1803–1804
- District of Louisiana, 1804–1805
- Territory of Louisiana, 1805–1812
- Territory of Missouri, (1812–1819)–1821
  - War of 1812, June 18, 1812 – March 23, 1815
    - Treaty of Ghent, December 24, 1814
  - Adams–Onis Treaty of 1819
- Territory of Arkansaw, (1819–1828)–1836
- Mexican territory of Santa Fé de Nuevo México, 1821–1848
  - Cimarron Cutoff of the Santa Fe Trail, 1826–1880
  - Mexican–American War, 1846–1848
    - Treaty of Guadalupe Hidalgo of 1848
- Indian Territory, 1824–1907
  - Indian Removal Act of 1830
    - Trail of Tears, 1830–1838
  - Indian Intercourse Act of 1834
  - Quapaw Indian Agency administered lands 1836–1890
  - Mexican–American War, April 25, 1846 – February 2, 1848
    - Treaty of Guadalupe Hidalgo, February 2, 1848
  - American Civil War, April 12, 1861 – May 13, 1865
    - Indian territory in the American Civil War
      - Border territory, 1861–1865
      - Price's Raid, September 27 – December 2, 1864
  - Southern Treaty Commission, 1865–1869
  - Dawes Act, February 8, 1887
- No Man's Land, 1848–1890
  - Compromise of 1850
  - Comanche Campaign, 1868–1874
  - Cimarron Territory, 1886–1890
  - Unassigned Lands 1862–1890
- Oklahoma Organic Act, 1890
  - Territory of Oklahoma, 1890–1907
- Spanish–American War, April 25 – August 12, 1898
- Enabling Act of 1906 providing conditions for Oklahoma Statehood
- State of Oklahoma becomes 46th state admitted to the United States of America on November 16, 1907
  - Oklahoma City bombing, April 19, 1995

=== History of Oklahoma, by region ===
- By city
  - History of Lawton, Oklahoma
  - History of Oklahoma City
  - History of Tulsa, Oklahoma
- By county
  - History of Adair County, Oklahoma
  - History of Beckham County, Oklahoma
  - History of Cotton County, Oklahoma
  - History of Custer County, Oklahoma
  - History of Grant County, Oklahoma
  - History of Greer County, Oklahoma
  - History of Harmon County, Oklahoma
  - History of Jackson County, Oklahoma
  - History of Oklahoma County, Oklahoma
  - History of Okmulgee County, Oklahoma
  - History of Pittsburg County, Oklahoma
  - History of Pushmataha County, Oklahoma
  - History of Roger Mills County, Oklahoma
  - History of Sequoyah County, Oklahoma
- Other
  - History of the Oklahoma Panhandle

=== History of Oklahoma, by subject ===
- History of the Oklahoma Constitution
- List of Oklahoma state legislatures
- History of the Oklahoma State Capitol
- History of the University of Oklahoma

== Culture of Oklahoma ==
Culture of Oklahoma

- Museums in Oklahoma
- Religion in Oklahoma
  - The Church of Jesus Christ of Latter-day Saints in Oklahoma
  - Episcopal Diocese of Oklahoma
- Scouting in Oklahoma
- State symbols of Oklahoma
  - Flag of the state of Oklahoma
  - Great Seal of the State of Oklahoma

=== The arts in Oklahoma ===
- Music of Oklahoma

=== Sports in Oklahoma ===
Sports in Oklahoma

== Economy and infrastructure of Oklahoma ==
Economy of Oklahoma

- Communications in Oklahoma
  - Newspapers in Oklahoma
  - Radio stations in Oklahoma
  - Television stations in Oklahoma
- Health care in Oklahoma
  - Hospitals in Oklahoma
- Transportation in Oklahoma
  - Airports in Oklahoma
- Former Indian Reservations in Oklahoma

== Education in Oklahoma ==
Education in Oklahoma

- Schools in Oklahoma
  - School districts in Oklahoma
    - High schools in Oklahoma
  - Private schools in Oklahoma
  - Colleges and universities in Oklahoma
    - University of Tulsa
    - University of Oklahoma
    - Oklahoma State University

== See also ==
- Topic overview:
  - Oklahoma
  - Index of Oklahoma-related articles
