= Oklahoma statistical areas =

Coordinates: 35.5889°N 97.4943°W

The U.S. State of Oklahoma currently has 28 statistical areas that have been delineated by the Office of Management and Budget (OMB). On March 6, 2020, the OMB delineated six combined statistical areas, five metropolitan statistical areas, and 17 micropolitan statistical areas in Oklahoma. As of 2023, the largest of these is the Oklahoma City-Shawnee, OK CSA, comprising the area around Oklahoma City, Oklahoma's capital and largest city.

== Statistical areas ==
The Office of Management and Budget (OMB) has designated more than 1,000 statistical areas for the United States and Puerto Rico. These statistical areas are important geographic delineations of population clusters used by the OMB, the United States Census Bureau, planning organizations, and federal, state, and local government entities.

The OMB defines a core-based statistical area (commonly referred to as a CBSA) as the county or counties (or county-equivalents) surrounding at least one densely-settled core of at least 10,000 population, "plus adjacent counties having a high degree of social and economic integration with the core as measured through commuting ties with the counties containing the core". The OMB further divides core-based statistical areas based on population into metropolitan statistical areas (MSAs) for those with at least 50,000 and micropolitan statistical areas (μSAs) for those with 10,000 to 49,999 people.

The OMB defines a combined statistical area (CSA) as two or more adjacent core-based statistical areas where the employment interchange rate (% commuting from A to B plus % commuting from B to A) is at least 15%. The primary statistical areas (PSAs) include all combined statistical areas and any core-based statistical area that is not a constituent of a combined statistical area.

The 28 United States statistical areas and 77 counties of the State of Oklahoma (Note: An out-of-state area and its population are displayed in green. An area that extends into more than one state is displayed in purple. A purple population number over a black population number show the total population versus the in-state population. The state's abbreviation is also shown next to the in-state total.)
Combined statistical area	2025 population (est.)	Core-based statistical area	2025 population (est.)	County	2025 population (est.)	Metropolitan division	2025 population (est.)
Oklahoma City-Shawnee, OK CSA	1,587,915	Oklahoma City, OK MSA	1,512,813	Oklahoma County, Oklahoma	822,125	none	
Oklahoma City-Shawnee, OK CSA	1,587,915	Oklahoma City, OK MSA	1,512,813	Cleveland County, Oklahoma	303,973	none	
Oklahoma City-Shawnee, OK CSA	1,587,915	Oklahoma City, OK MSA	1,512,813	Canadian County, Oklahoma	187,189	none	
Oklahoma City-Shawnee, OK CSA	1,587,915	Oklahoma City, OK MSA	1,512,813	Grady County, Oklahoma	59,128	none	
Oklahoma City-Shawnee, OK CSA	1,587,915	Oklahoma City, OK MSA	1,512,813	Logan County, Oklahoma	55,473	none	
Oklahoma City-Shawnee, OK CSA	1,587,915	Oklahoma City, OK MSA	1,512,813	McClain County, Oklahoma	49,647	none	
Oklahoma City-Shawnee, OK CSA	1,587,915	Oklahoma City, OK MSA	1,512,813	Lincoln County, Oklahoma	35,278	none	
Oklahoma City-Shawnee, OK CSA	1,587,915	Shawnee, OK μSA	75,102	Pottawatomie County, Oklahoma	75,102	none	
Tulsa-Muskogee-Bartlesville, OK CSA	1,190,018	Tulsa, OK MSA	1,069,273	Tulsa County, Oklahoma	698,782	none	
Tulsa-Muskogee-Bartlesville, OK CSA	1,190,018	Tulsa, OK MSA	1,069,273	Rogers County, Oklahoma	102,197	none	
Tulsa-Muskogee-Bartlesville, OK CSA	1,190,018	Tulsa, OK MSA	1,069,273	Wagoner County, Oklahoma	93,263	none	
Tulsa-Muskogee-Bartlesville, OK CSA	1,190,018	Tulsa, OK MSA	1,069,273	Creek County, Oklahoma	74,967	none	
Tulsa-Muskogee-Bartlesville, OK CSA	1,190,018	Tulsa, OK MSA	1,069,273	Osage County, Oklahoma	46,794	none	
Tulsa-Muskogee-Bartlesville, OK CSA	1,190,018	Tulsa, OK MSA	1,069,273	Okmulgee County, Oklahoma	37,241	none	
Tulsa-Muskogee-Bartlesville, OK CSA	1,190,018	Tulsa, OK MSA	1,069,273	Pawnee County, Oklahoma	16,029	none	
Tulsa-Muskogee-Bartlesville, OK CSA	1,190,018	Muskogee, OK μSA	66,708	Muskogee County, Oklahoma	66,708	none	
Tulsa-Muskogee-Bartlesville, OK CSA	1,190,018	Bartlesville, OK μSA	54,037	Washington County, Oklahoma	54,037	none	
Lawton-Duncan, OK CSA	171,900	Lawton, OK MSA	127,590	Comanche County, Oklahoma	122,158	none	
Lawton-Duncan, OK CSA	171,900	Lawton, OK MSA	127,590	Cotton County, Oklahoma	5,432	none	
Lawton-Duncan, OK CSA	171,900	Duncan, OK μSA	44,310	Stephens County, Oklahoma	44,310	none	
none		Stillwater, OK μSA	83,889	Payne County, Oklahoma	83,889	none	
none		Enid, OK MSA	61,779	Garfield County, Oklahoma	61,779	none	
Weatherford-Elk City, OK CSA	61,218	Weatherford, OK μSA	39,059	Custer County, Oklahoma	28,175	none	
Weatherford-Elk City, OK CSA	61,218	Weatherford, OK μSA	39,059	Washita County, Oklahoma	10,884	none	
Weatherford-Elk City, OK CSA	61,218	Elk City, OK μSA	22,159	Beckham County, Oklahoma	22,159	none	
Dallas-Fort Worth, TX-OK CSA	9,051,994; 51,367 (OK)	Dallas-Fort Worth-Arlington, TX MSA	8,477,157	Dallas County, Texas	2,661,397	Dallas-Plano-Irving, TX MD	5,742,098
Dallas-Fort Worth, TX-OK CSA	9,051,994; 51,367 (OK)	Dallas-Fort Worth-Arlington, TX MSA	8,477,157	Collin County, Texas	1,297,179	Dallas-Plano-Irving, TX MD	5,742,098
Dallas-Fort Worth, TX-OK CSA	9,051,994; 51,367 (OK)	Dallas-Fort Worth-Arlington, TX MSA	8,477,157	Denton County, Texas	1,069,346	Dallas-Plano-Irving, TX MD	5,742,098
Dallas-Fort Worth, TX-OK CSA	9,051,994; 51,367 (OK)	Dallas-Fort Worth-Arlington, TX MSA	8,477,157	Ellis County, Texas	240,867	Dallas-Plano-Irving, TX MD	5,742,098
Dallas-Fort Worth, TX-OK CSA	9,051,994; 51,367 (OK)	Dallas-Fort Worth-Arlington, TX MSA	8,477,157	Kaufman County, Texas	209,235	Dallas-Plano-Irving, TX MD	5,742,098
Dallas-Fort Worth, TX-OK CSA	9,051,994; 51,367 (OK)	Dallas-Fort Worth-Arlington, TX MSA	8,477,157	Rockwall County, Texas	140,738	Dallas-Plano-Irving, TX MD	5,742,098
Dallas-Fort Worth, TX-OK CSA	9,051,994; 51,367 (OK)	Dallas-Fort Worth-Arlington, TX MSA	8,477,157	Hunt County, Texas	123,336	Dallas-Plano-Irving, TX MD	5,742,098
Dallas-Fort Worth, TX-OK CSA	9,051,994; 51,367 (OK)	Dallas-Fort Worth-Arlington, TX MSA	8,477,157	Tarrant County, Texas	2,248,466	Fort Worth-Arlington-Grapevine, TX MD	2,735,059
Dallas-Fort Worth, TX-OK CSA	9,051,994; 51,367 (OK)	Dallas-Fort Worth-Arlington, TX MSA	8,477,157	Johnson County, Texas	218,048	Fort Worth-Arlington-Grapevine, TX MD	2,735,059
Dallas-Fort Worth, TX-OK CSA	9,051,994; 51,367 (OK)	Dallas-Fort Worth-Arlington, TX MSA	8,477,157	Parker County, Texas	184,767	Fort Worth-Arlington-Grapevine, TX MD	2,735,059
Dallas-Fort Worth, TX-OK CSA	9,051,994; 51,367 (OK)	Dallas-Fort Worth-Arlington, TX MSA	8,477,157	Wise County, Texas	78,097	Fort Worth-Arlington-Grapevine, TX MD	2,735,059
Dallas-Fort Worth, TX-OK CSA	9,051,994; 51,367 (OK)	Sherman-Denison, TX MSA	153,613	Grayson County, Texas	153,613	none	
Dallas-Fort Worth, TX-OK CSA	9,051,994; 51,367 (OK)	Athens, TX μSA	88,595	Henderson County, Texas	88,595	none	
Dallas-Fort Worth, TX-OK CSA	9,051,994; 51,367 (OK)	Granbury, TX μSA	70,501	Hood County, Texas	70,501	none	
Dallas-Fort Worth, TX-OK CSA	9,051,994; 51,367 (OK)	Corsicana, TX μSA	57,181	Navarro County, Texas	57,181	none	
Dallas-Fort Worth, TX-OK CSA	9,051,994; 51,367 (OK)	Durant, OK μSA	51,367	Bryan County, Oklahoma	51,367	none	
Dallas-Fort Worth, TX-OK CSA	9,051,994; 51,367 (OK)	Gainesville, TX μSA	44,461	Cooke County, Texas	44,461	none	
Dallas-Fort Worth, TX-OK CSA	9,051,994; 51,367 (OK)	Sulphur Springs, TX μSA	39,063	Hopkins County, Texas	39,063	none	
Dallas-Fort Worth, TX-OK CSA	9,051,994; 51,367 (OK)	Bonham, TX μSA	39,265	Fannin County, Texas	39,265	none	
Dallas-Fort Worth, TX-OK CSA	9,051,994; 51,367 (OK)	Mineral Wells, TX μSA	30,791	Palo Pinto County, Texas	30,791	none	
none		Ardmore, OK μSA	48,910	Carter County, Oklahoma	48,910	none	
none		Tahlequah, OK μSA	49,196	Cherokee County, Oklahoma	49,196	none	
none		Ponca City, OK μSA	43,490	Kay County, Oklahoma	43,490	none	
none		McAlester, OK μSA	43,320	Pittsburg County, Oklahoma	43,320	none	
none		Fort Smith, AR-OK MSA	234,140; 40,842 (OK)	Sebastian County, Arkansas	130,641	none	
none		Fort Smith, AR-OK MSA	234,140; 40,842 (OK)	Crawford County, Arkansas	62,657	none	
none		Fort Smith, AR-OK MSA	234,140; 40,842 (OK)	Sequoyah County, Oklahoma	40,291	none	
none		Ada, OK μSA	38,528	Pontotoc County, Oklahoma	38,528	none	
Joplin-Miami, MO-OK-KS CSA	239,234; 30,438 (OK)	Joplin, MO-KS MSA	208,796	Jasper County, Missouri	127,428	none	
Joplin-Miami, MO-OK-KS CSA	239,234; 30,438 (OK)	Joplin, MO-KS MSA	208,796	Newton County, Missouri	62,263	none	
Joplin-Miami, MO-OK-KS CSA	239,234; 30,438 (OK)	Joplin, MO-KS MSA	208,796	Cherokee County, Kansas	19,105	none	
Joplin-Miami, MO-OK-KS CSA	239,234; 30,438 (OK)	Miami, OK μSA	30,438	Ottawa County, Oklahoma	30,438	none	
none		Altus, OK μSA	24,764	Jackson County, Oklahoma	24,764	none	
none		Guymon, OK μSA	20,322	Texas County, Oklahoma	20,322	none	
none		Woodward, OK μSA	19,827	Woodward County, Oklahoma	19,827	none	
none		none		Le Flore County, Oklahoma	50,196	none	
none		none		Delaware County, Oklahoma	41,910	none	
none		none		Mayes County, Oklahoma	40,416	none	
none		none		McCurtain County, Oklahoma	30,744	none	
none		none		Caddo County, Oklahoma	26,130	none	
none		none		Garvin County, Oklahoma	26,377	none	
none		none		Seminole County, Oklahoma	23,441	none	
none		none		Adair County, Oklahoma	19,828	none	
none		none		McIntosh County, Oklahoma	19,758	none	
none		none		Marshall County, Oklahoma	16,255	none	
none		none		Kingfisher County, Oklahoma	15,795	none	
none		none		Atoka County, Oklahoma	14,609	none	
none		none		Craig County, Oklahoma	14,518	none	
none		none		Choctaw County, Oklahoma	14,059	none	
none		none		Murray County, Oklahoma	13,805	none	
none		none		Hughes County, Oklahoma	13,455	none	
none		none		Haskell County, Oklahoma	11,787	none	
none		none		Okfuskee County, Oklahoma	11,451	none	
none		none		Noble County, Oklahoma	10,899	none	
none		none		Pushmataha County, Oklahoma	10,807	none	
none		none		Love County, Oklahoma	10,780	none	
none		none		Johnston County, Oklahoma	10,448	none	
none		none		Latimer County, Oklahoma	9,645	none	
none		none		Nowata County, Oklahoma	9,522	none	
none		none		Woods County, Oklahoma	8,443	none	
none		none		Blaine County, Oklahoma	8,515	none	
none		none		Kiowa County, Oklahoma	8,181	none	
none		none		Major County, Oklahoma	7,536	none	
none		none		Tillman County, Oklahoma	6,780	none	
none		none		Alfalfa County, Oklahoma	5,649	none	
none		none		Greer County, Oklahoma	5,373	none	
none		none		Jefferson County, Oklahoma	5,431	none	
none		none		Coal County, Oklahoma	5,436	none	
none		none		Beaver County, Oklahoma	4,882	none	
none		none		Dewey County, Oklahoma	4,207	none	
none		none		Grant County, Oklahoma	4,067	none	
none		none		Ellis County, Oklahoma	3,613	none	
none		none		Roger Mills County, Oklahoma	3,259	none	
none		none		Harper County, Oklahoma	3,172	none	
none		none		Harmon County, Oklahoma	2,327	none	
none		none		Cimarron County, Oklahoma	2,059	none	
State of Oklahoma					4,123,288	none	

The 22 core-based statistical areas of the State of Oklahoma (Note: For CBSAs comprising populations from multiple states, they are listed twice to show both their intrastate population within that CBSA as well as the CBSA's total population. Only the intrastate population is ranked.)
2025 rank	Core-based statistical area	Population				
2025 rank	Core-based statistical area	2025 estimate	Change	2020 Census	Change	2010 Census
1	Oklahoma City, OK MSA	1,512,813	+6.11%	1,425,695	+13.78%	1,252,987
2	Tulsa, OK MSA	1,069,273	+5.31%	1,015,331	+8.30%	937,478
3	Lawton, OK MSA	127,590	+0.74%	126,652	−2.79%	130,291
4	Stillwater, OK μSA	83,889	+2.75%	81,646	+5.55%	77,350
5	Shawnee, OK μSA	75,102	+3.65%	72,454	+4.34%	69,442
6	Muskogee, OK μSA	66,708	+0.56%	66,339	−6.55%	70,990
7	Enid, OK MSA	61,779	−1.70%	62,846	+3.74%	60,580
8	Bartlesville, OK μSA	54,037	+3.02%	52,455	+2.90%	50,976
9	Durant, OK μSA	51,367	+11.50%	46,067	+8.61%	42,416
10	Ardmore, OK μSA	48,910	+1.89%	48,003	+0.94%	47,557
11	Tahlequah, OK μSA	49,196	+4.50%	47,078	+0.19%	46,987
12	Duncan, OK μSA	44,310	+3.41%	42,848	−4.88%	45,048
13	Ponca City, OK μSA	43,490	−0.48%	43,700	−6.15%	46,562
14	McAlester, OK μSA	43,320	−1.03%	43,773	−4.50%	45,837
15	Fort Smith, AR-OK MSA (OK)	40,842	+3.97%	39,281	−7.34%	42,391
16	Weatherford, OK μSA	39,059	−0.96%	39,437	+0.87%	39,098
17	Ada, OK μSA	38,528	+1.22%	38,065	+1.53%	37,492
18	Miami, OK μSA	30,438	+0.51%	30,285	−4.91%	31,848
19	Altus, OK μSA	24,764	−0.08%	24,785	−6.28%	26,446
20	Elk City, OK μSA	22,159	−1.12%	22,410	+1.32%	22,119
21	Guymon, OK μSA	20,322	−4.97%	21,384	+3.60%	20,640
22	Woodward, OK μSA	19,827	−3.14%	20,470	+1.94%	20,081
	Fort Smith, AR-OK MSA	234,140	+3.05%	227,213	−1.25%	230,083

The six combined statistical area of the State of Oklahoma (Note: For CSAs comprising populations from multiple states, they are listed twice to show both their intrastate population within that CSA as well as the CSA's total population. Only the intrastate population is ranked.)
2025 rank	Combined statistical area	Population				
2025 rank	Combined statistical area	2025 estimate	Change	2020 Census	Change	2010 Census
1	Oklahoma City-Shawnee, OK CSA	1,587,915	+5.99%	1,498,149	+13.29%	1,322,429
2	Tulsa-Muskogee-Bartlesville, OK CSA	1,190,018	+4.93%	1,134,125	+7.05%	1,059,444
3	Lawton-Duncan, OK CSA	171,900	+1.42%	169,500	−3.33%	175,339
4	Weatherford-Elk City, OK CSA	61,218	−1.02%	61,847	+1.03%	61,217
5	Dallas-Fort Worth, TX-OK CSA (OK)	51,367	+11.50%	46,067	+8.61%	42,416
6	Joplin-Miami, MO-OK-KS CSA (OK)	30,438	+0.51%	30,285	−4.91%	31,848
	Dallas-Fort Worth, TX-OK CSA	9,051,994	+10.96%	8,157,895	+19.22%	6,842,908
	Joplin-Miami, MO-OK-KS CSA	239,234	+3.54%	231,056	+0.91%	228,969

== See also ==
- Geography of Oklahoma
  - Demographics of Oklahoma
