= List of Oklahoma area codes =

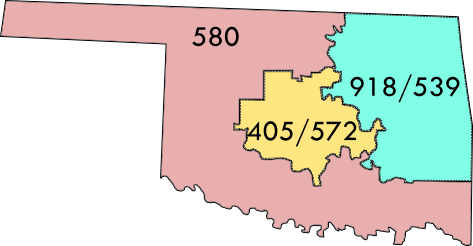
Map of Oklahoma with area code boundaries

The state of Oklahoma is served by the following area codes:

Area code	Year created	Parent NPA	Overlay	Numbering plan area
405	1947	–	405/572	Central Oklahoma, including Oklahoma City
572	2021	405	405/572	Central Oklahoma, including Oklahoma City
918	1953	405	539/918	Northeastern Oklahoma, including Tulsa
539	2011	918	539/918	Northeastern Oklahoma, including Tulsa
580	1997	405	–	Western and southern Oklahoma

== See also ==
- List of North American Numbering Plan area codes
- Original North American area codes
