= Oklahoma Native Plant Society =

- Formation: 1986
- Headquarters: Tulsa, Oklahoma
- Website: www.oknativeplants.org

The Oklahoma Native Plant Society (ONPS), was founded in 1986, to encourage the study, protection, propagation, appreciation, and use of Oklahoma's native plants. From its beginning, the Society has brought together botanists, conservationists, and enthusiasts who share a commitment to preserving Oklahoma’s diverse landscapes.

It sponsors a number of activities including field trips, a spring wildflower workshop, and a wildflower photo contest. The society also publishes a quarterly newsletter, The Gaillardia, which keeps members informed of activities and contains stories and essays about wildflowers. In addition, the society sponsors Color Oklahoma, a project dedicated to the beautification of Oklahoma's highways via the planting of wildflowers and maintenance of naturally occurring wildflower populations in rights-of-way.

== Invasive Plant Council ==
The Oklahoma Native Plant Society works with the Oklahoma Invasive Plant Council to educate the public about the harm caused by invasive plants in Oklahoma and to help control the spread of invasive plants in the state.

== The Oklahoma Native Plant Record ==
Initiated in 2001, The Oklahoma Native Plant Record is the annual scientific publication of the Oklahoma Native Plant Society.
