= Seal of Oklahoma =

Official government emblem of the U.S. state of Oklahoma

The Great Seal of Oklahoma
- Armiger: State of Oklahoma
- Adopted: July 16, 1907
- Motto: Latin: Labor omnia vincit, lit. 'Labor Conquers All Things'
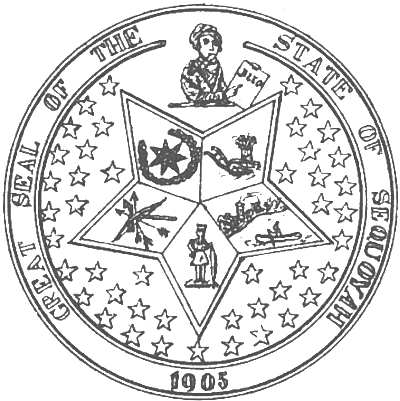
- Earlier version
- Use: Proposed seal of the State of Sequoyah (1905)

The Great Seal of Oklahoma was officially adopted in 1907 and is used to authenticate certain documents issued by the Government of Oklahoma. The phrase is used both for the physical seal itself, which is kept by the Secretary of State, and more generally for the design impressed upon it.

== Design ==
The five rays of the star hold the seals of the Five Civilized Tribes – Cherokee, Chickasaw, Choctaw, Creek, and Seminole, all of whom have a major presence in the state.

The Seal of the Cherokee Nation is in the upper left-hand ray. It consists of a large, seven-pointed star surrounded by a wreath of oak leaves. The seven-pointed star represents the seven ancient clans of the Cherokee people. The wreath of oak leaves refers to oak wood, the principal hardwood in the old Cherokee country in the Carolinas that was used in maintaining the perpetually burning sacred fire. In this connection, oak was a symbol of strength and everlasting life.

The Seal of the Chickasaw Nation is in the top ray. It consists of an Indian warrior standing in ancient regalia, carrying two arrows in his right hand, a long bow in his left, and a shield on his left shoulder. The two arrows represent his guard over the two ancient tribal divisions, from which all Chickasaw clan and house names originated. According to old tribal lore, the bow and the shield represent the insignia of the Chickasaw warrior by right of his descent from the “House of Warriors”.

The Seal of the Choctaw Nation is in the upper right-hand ray. It consists of an unstrung bow with three arrows and a pipe-hatchet blended together. The ceremonial pipe-hatchet was passed around and smoked in council when deliberating important tribal matters. Though a peaceable people, the Choctaws were noted for great strength in defending their homes and country. The unstrung bow represents peace yet instant preparedness for defense. The three arrows, always ready, stood for the three great Choctaw chiefs.

The Seal of the Creek (Muscogee) Nation is in the lower left-hand ray. It consists of a sheaf of wheat and a plow. The plow and sheaf of wheat were chosen as modern symbols of agricultural industry, for which the Creeks were noted from earliest times. It is a reference to the prosperity that agriculture brought to the Creek people.

The Seal of the Seminole Nation is in the lower right-hand ray. It consists of a plumed tribesman shown paddling a canoe across the lake to a village with a trading post standing near the shore. This scene represents some of the early customs surrounding the act of gathering, preserving and trading plants that were held sacred in connection with their ancient tribal religious rites and ceremonies. It is symbolic of peace and plenty.

Around the large star are 45 smaller stars, representing the 45 U.S. states that existed prior to Oklahoma's statehood (the large star would be the 46th star in the seal, representing Oklahoma's admission as the 46th state).

== Symbolism ==
The center of the star contains the territorial seal. The seal contains the words Labor omnia vincit, meaning 'Labor Conquers All Things'. Columbia is the central figure, representing justice and statehood. She is surrounded by an image of the American pioneer farmer on her right and the aboriginal American Indian on her left, both of whom are shaking hands beneath the scales of Justice, symbolizing equal justice between the Anglo and Native American races in Oklahoma and on the part of the federal government. Beneath the trio is the cornucopia of plenty and the olive branch of peace, and behind is the sun of progress and civilization.

== See also ==
- Flag of Oklahoma
- Flag of the governor of Oklahoma
- List of Oklahoma state symbols
