= Northwestern Oklahoma =

Geographical region of Oklahoma, US

Coordinates: 36.5°N 99.0°W

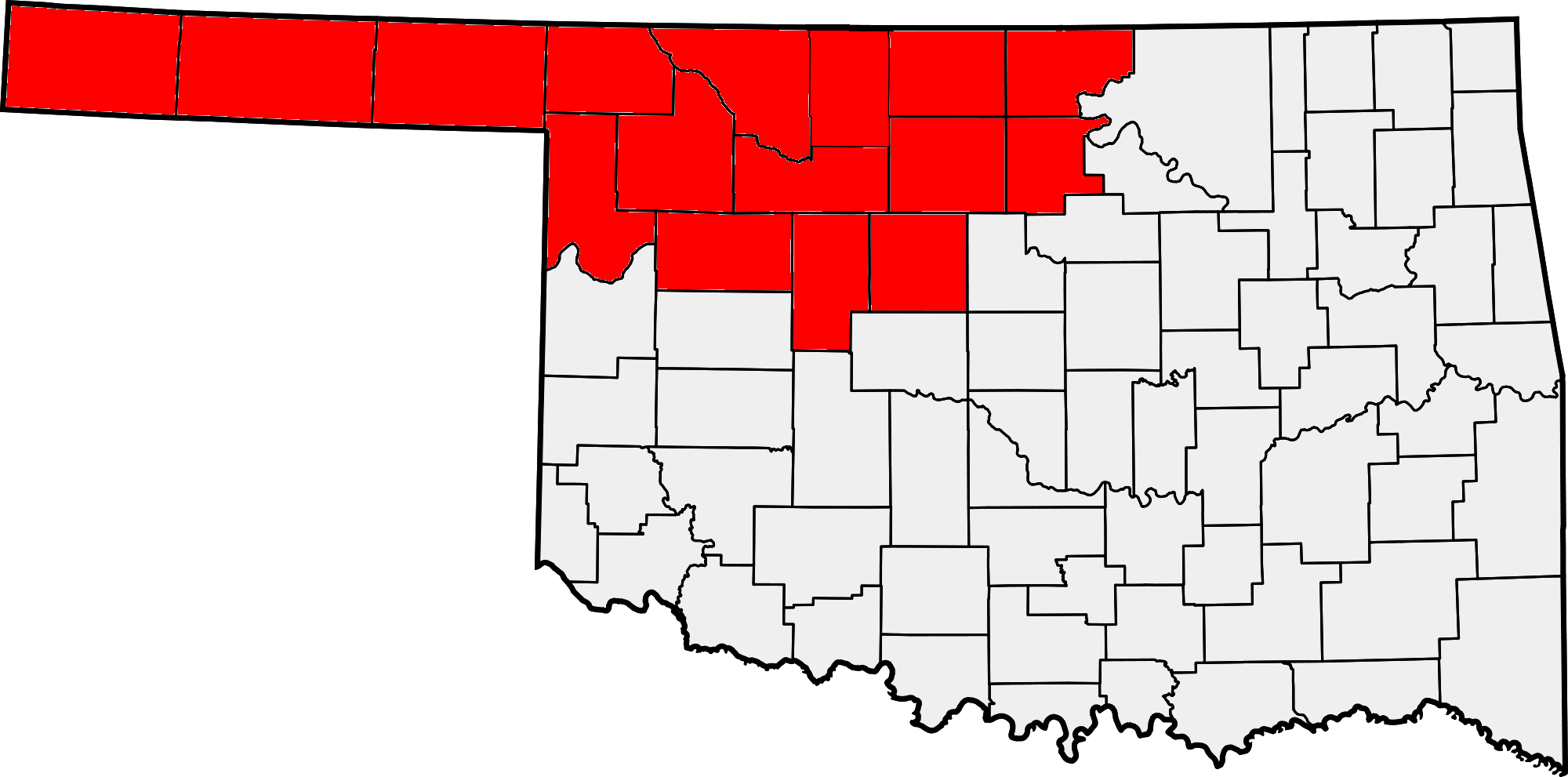
Map of Oklahoma highlighting Northwestern Oklahoma.

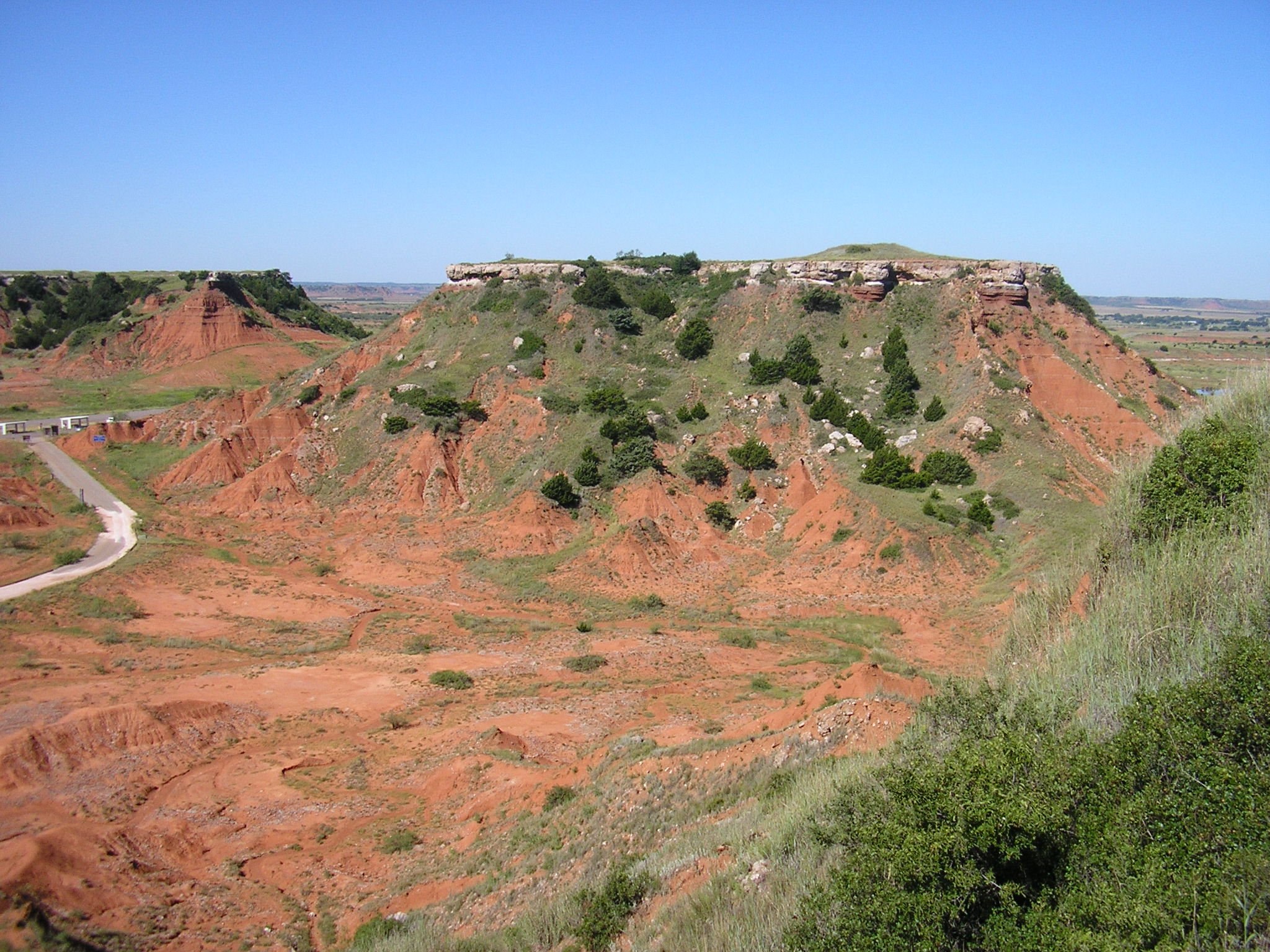
The Glass Mountains are a series of mesas south of the Cimarron River.

Northwestern Oklahoma is the geographical region of the state of Oklahoma which includes the Oklahoma Panhandle and a majority of the Cherokee Outlet, stretching to an eastern extent along Interstate 35, and its southern extent along the Canadian River to Noble County. Northwest Oklahoma is also known by its Oklahoma Department of Tourism designation, Red Carpet Country, which is named after the region's red soil and alludes to the metaphor that the panhandle is a "red carpet" into Oklahoma. The region consists of Cimarron, Texas, Beaver, Harper, Woods, Alfalfa, Grant, Kay, Ellis, Woodward, Major, Garfield, Noble, Dewey, Blaine, and Kingfisher counties.

The area is anchored economically by Enid, which also contains the region's largest commercial airport. Other important cities include Guymon, Ponca City, Woodward, and Alva.

== History ==
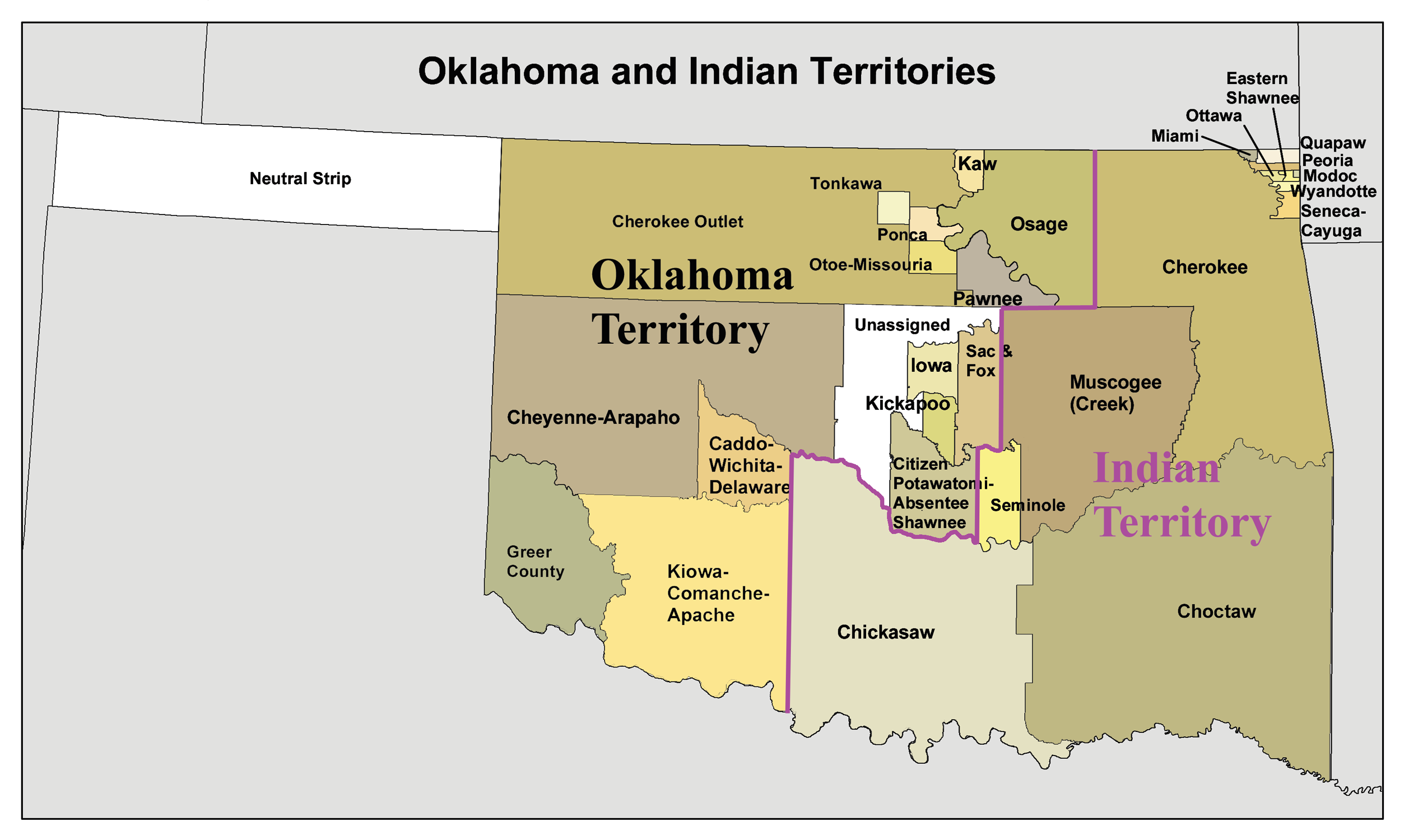
Map of Oklahoma Territory, Indian Territory and the "neutral territory"

Northwestern Oklahoma became part of the United States through the Louisiana Purchase and through the entrance of Texas into the Union in 1845 as a slave state. At the time, federal law, based on the Missouri Compromise, prohibited slavery in the region that would become the Oklahoma Panhandle. Under the Compromise of 1850, Texas surrendered its lands north of 36°30' latitude. The 170-mile strip of land, a "neutral strip", was left with no state or territorial ownership from 1850 until 1890. It was officially called the "Public Land Strip" and was commonly referred to as "No Man's Land."

The Compromise of 1850 also established the eastern boundary of New Mexico Territory at the 103rd meridian, thus setting the western boundary of the strip. The Kansas–Nebraska Act of 1854 set the southern border of Kansas Territory as the 37th parallel. This became the northern boundary of No Man's Land.

In 1889, the Unassigned Lands were opened for settlement. The passage of the Organic Act in 1890 assigned No Man's Land to the new Oklahoma Territory. No Man's Land became Seventh County under the newly organized Oklahoma Territory, land was soon renamed Beaver County. Northwestern Oklahoma took its current form when Oklahoma Territory and Indian Territory joined the Union in 1907 as the single U.S. state of Oklahoma.

== Geography ==
Northwest Oklahoma ranges from dry and flat to an area with mountain ranges and mesas, a testament to the Southwest Tablelands ecoregion that dominates the area. Canyons and grasslands, such as the Rita Blanca National Grassland, help to give Northwest Oklahoma a distinctive Southwest-like landscape, differing from other parts of the state. Black Mesa, the state's highest peak at 4,973 feet, is part of a large range of mesas in the panhandle which stretch into New Mexico. Another mesa range, the Glass (or Gloss) Mountains, sits in the center of Northwest Oklahoma, just south of the Cimarron River along Highway 412. Great Salt Plains Lake, one of the largest inland salt lakes in the United States, is located near Alva.
