= Geography of Oklahoma =

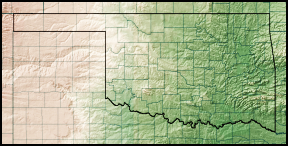
Oklahoma topographical map

Geographic map of Oklahoma

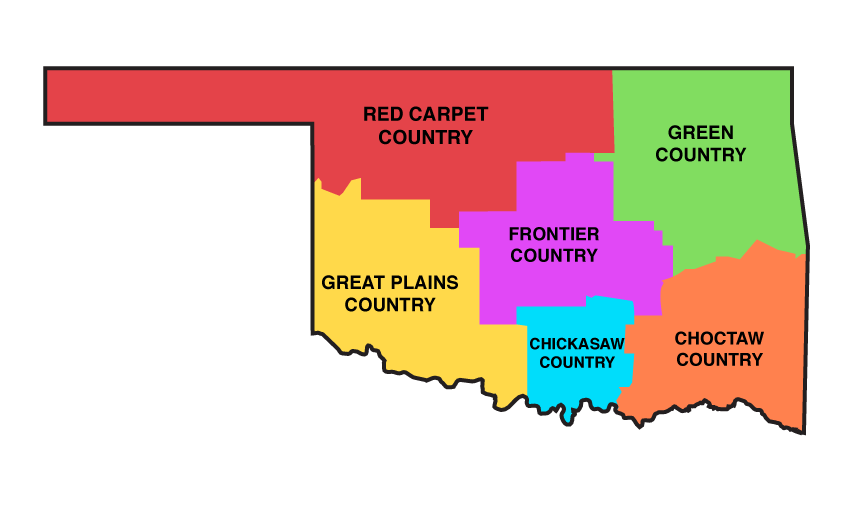
Regional map of Oklahoma

The Geography of Oklahoma encompasses terrain and ecosystems ranging from arid plains to subtropical forests and mountains. Oklahoma contains 10 distinct ecological regions, more per square mile than in any other state by a wide margin. It is situated in the Great Plains and U.S. Interior Highlands region near the geographical center of the 48 contiguous states. Usually considered part of the South Central United States, Oklahoma is bounded on the east by Arkansas and Missouri, on the north by Kansas, on the northwest by Colorado, on the far west by New Mexico, and on the south and near-west by Texas.

The state has four primary mountain ranges: the Arbuckle Mountains, the Wichita Mountains, the Ozark Mountains and the Ouachita Mountains. Part of the U.S. Interior Highlands region, the Ozarks and Ouachitas form one of the only major highland regions between the Rocky Mountains and the Appalachians.

A portion of the Flint Hills stretches into north-central Oklahoma, and in the state's southeastern corner, Cavanal Hill is officially regarded as the world's tallest hill; at 1,999 feet (609 m), it fails the definition of a mountain by one foot. More than 500 named creeks and rivers make up Oklahoma's waterways, and with 200 lakes created by dams, it holds the highest number of reservoirs in the nation. Oklahoma covers an area of 69,898 square miles (181,030 km^{2}), with 68,667 square miles (177,850 km^{2}) of land and 1,231 square miles (3,190 km^{2}) of water, making it the 20th-largest state in the United States. Generally, it is divided into seven geographical regions: Green Country (Northeast Oklahoma), Choctaw Country (Southeast Oklahoma), Central Oklahoma (Frontier Country), South Central Oklahoma (Chickasaw Country), Southwest Oklahoma (Great Plains Country), Northwest Oklahoma (Red Carpet Country), and the Oklahoma Panhandle.

== Topography ==
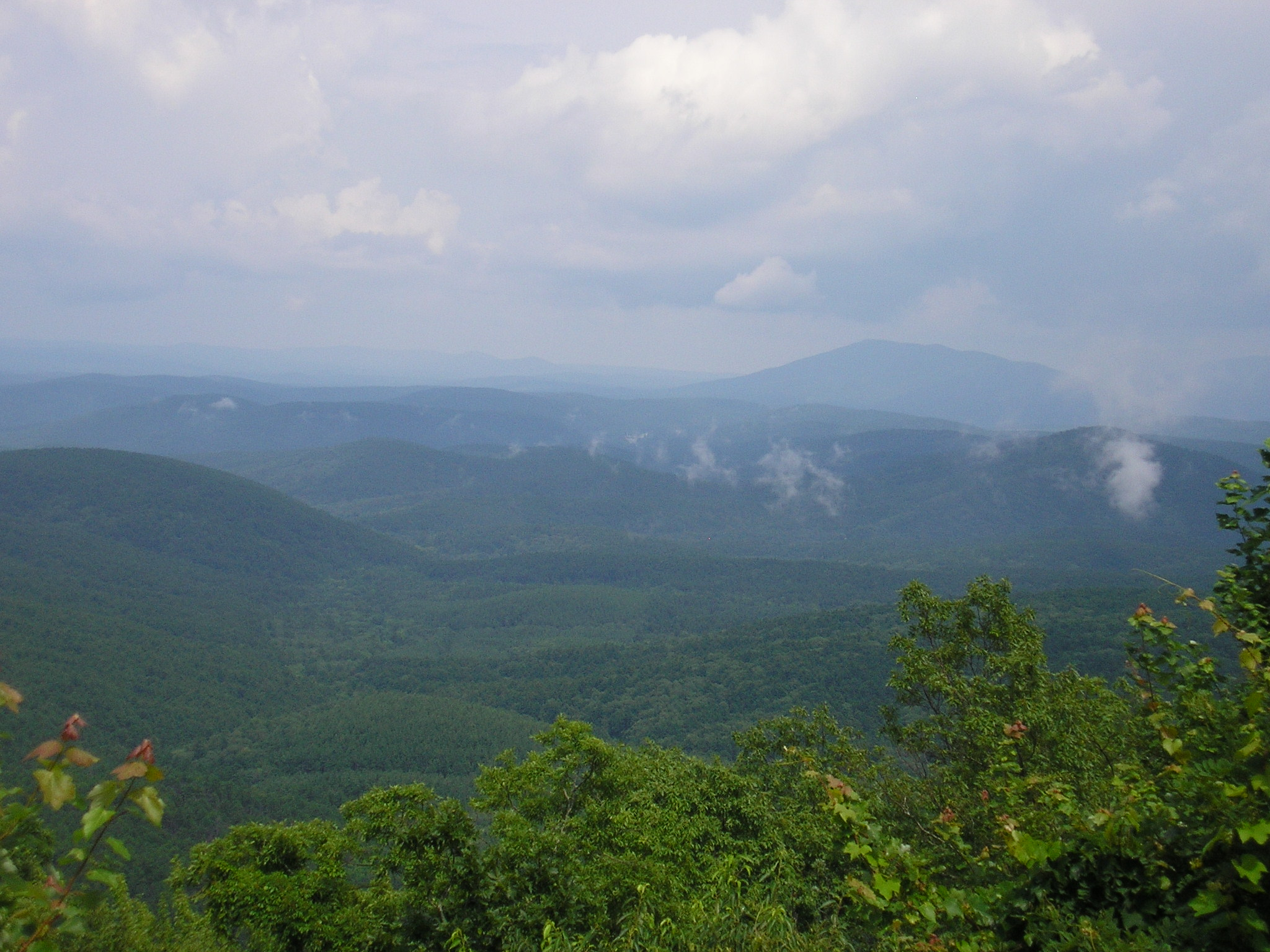
The Ouachita Mountains cover much of southeastern Oklahoma.

Situated between the Great Plains and the Ozark Plateau in the Gulf of Mexico watershed, Oklahoma tends to slope gradually downward from its western to eastern boundaries. Its highest and lowest points follow this trend, with its highest peak, Black Mesa, at 4,368 feet (1,516 m) above sea level, situated near the far northwest corner of the Oklahoma Panhandle. The state's lowest point is on the Little River near its far southeastern boundary, which dips to 289 feet (88 m) above sea level.

Most of the state lies in two primary drainage basins belonging to the Red and Arkansas rivers, though the Lee and Little rivers also contain significant drainage basins. In the state's northwestern corner, semi-arid high plains harbor few natural forests and rolling to flat landscape with intermittent canyons and mesa ranges like the Glass Mountains. Partial plains interrupted by small mountain ranges like the Antelope Hills and the Wichita Mountains dot southwestern Oklahoma, and transitional prairie and woodlands cover the central portion of the state. The Ozark and Ouachita (pronounced Oh-Wa-Sheet-ah) Mountains rise from west to east over the state's eastern third, gradually increasing in elevation in an eastward direction.

Oklahoma had few natural lakes. Those that did exist were either oxbow or playa lakes. Oklahoma has sixty-two oxbow lakes above 10 acres (0.040 km^{2}) in size. The largest, near the Red River in McCurtain County is 272 acres (1.10 km^{2}). The prolonged drought that started in 1930 and created the condition called the "Dust Bowl", led to the construction of a great many reservoirs throughout the state. Now, Oklahoma has the largest number of lakes created by dams of any state in the United States, with more than 200.

== Flora and fauna ==
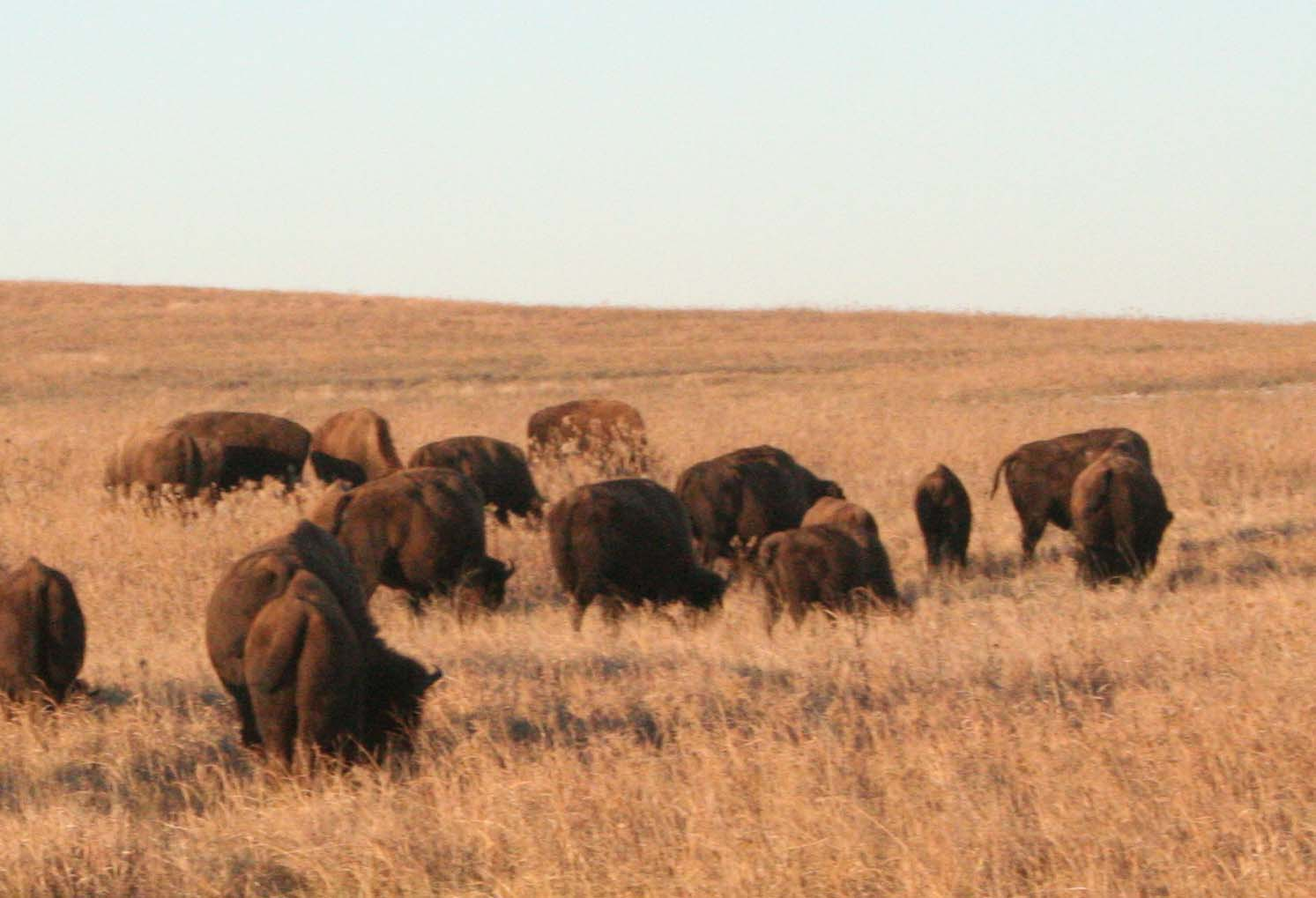
Populations of American bison inhabit the state's prairie ecosystems.

Forests cover 24 percent of Oklahoma, and prairie grasslands, composed of shortgrass, mixed-grass, and tallgrass prairie, harbor expansive ecosystems in the state's central and western portions. Where rainfall is sparse in the western regions of the state, shortgrass prairie and shrublands are the most prominent ecosystems, though pinyon pines, junipers, and ponderosa pines grow near rivers and creek beds in the far western reaches of the panhandle. Marshlands, cypress forests and mixtures of shortleaf pine, loblolly pine, sabal minor, and deciduous forests dominate the state's southeastern quarter, while mixtures of largely post oak, elm, cedar and pine forests cover the Ozark Mountains in northeastern Oklahoma. Many rare, relic species such as sugar maple, bigtooth maple, southern live oak, and nolina inhabit Southwestern Oklahoma and the Wichita Mountains.

The state holds large populations of white-tailed deer, coyotes, bobcats, elk, and birds such as quail, doves, cardinals, bald eagles, red-tailed hawks, and pheasants. In prairie ecosystems, american bison, greater prairie-chickens, badgers, and armadillo are common, and some of the nation's largest prairie dog towns inhabit shortgrass prairie in the state's panhandle. The Cross Timbers, a region transitioning from prairie to woodlands in Central Oklahoma, harbors 351 vertebrate species. The Ouachita Mountains are home to black bear, red fox, grey fox, and river otter populations, which coexist with a total of 328 vertebrate species in southeastern Oklahoma.

== Protected lands ==
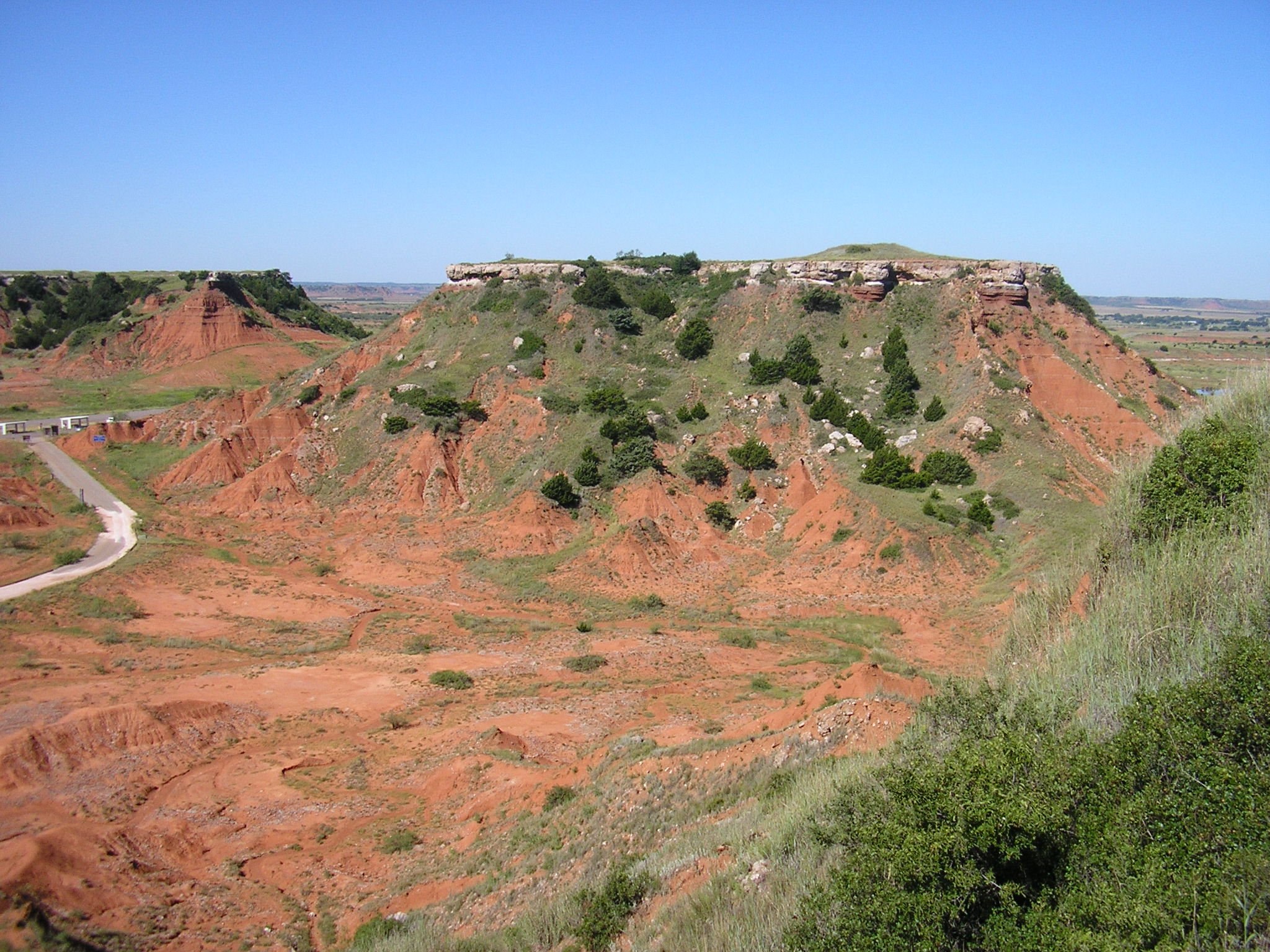
Mesas rise above Oklahoma's Glass Mountain state park.

Oklahoma has 41 state parks, two national protected forests or grasslands, and a network of wildlife preserves and conservation areas. Six percent of the state's 10 million acres (40,000 km^{2}) of forest is public land, including the western portions of the Ouachita National Forest, the largest and oldest national forest in the southern United States. With 39,000 acres (160 km^{2}), the Tallgrass Prairie Preserve in north-central Oklahoma is the largest protected area of tallgrass prairie in the world and is part of an ecosystem that encompasses only 10 percent of its former land area, once covering 14 states. In addition, the Black Kettle National Grassland covers 31,300 acres (127 km^{2}) of prairie in southwestern Oklahoma. The Wichita Mountains Wildlife Refuge is the oldest and largest of nine national wildlife refuges in the state and was founded in 1901, encompassing 59,020 acres (238.8 km^{2}). Of Oklahoma's federally protected park or recreational sites, the Chickasaw National Recreation Area is the largest, with 4,500 acres (18 km^{2}). Other federal protected sites include the Santa Fe and Trail of Tears national historic trails, the Fort Smith and Washita Battlefield national historic sites, and the Oklahoma City National Memorial.

== Climate ==
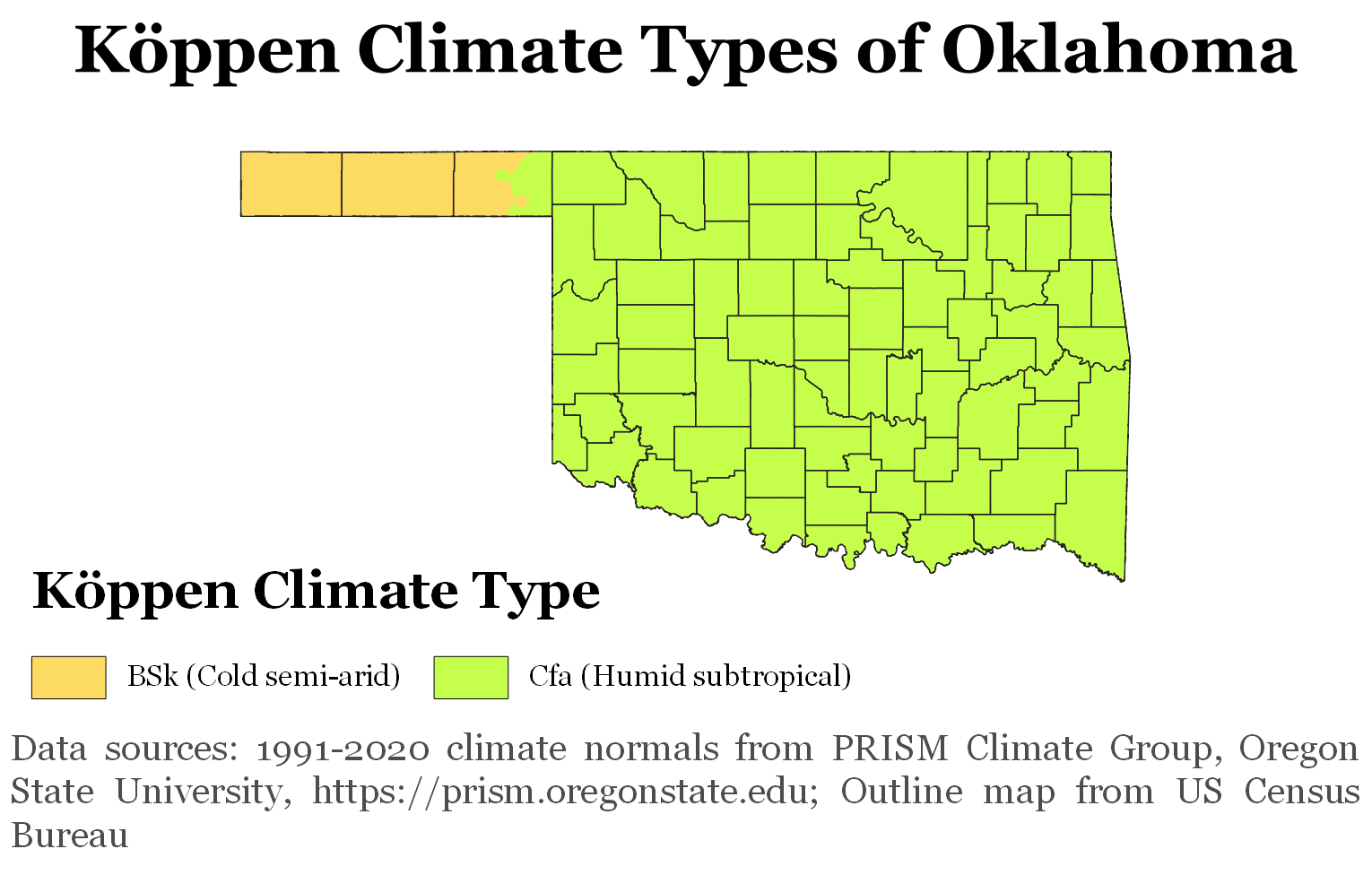
Köppen climate types of Oklahoma, using 1991-2020 climate normals.

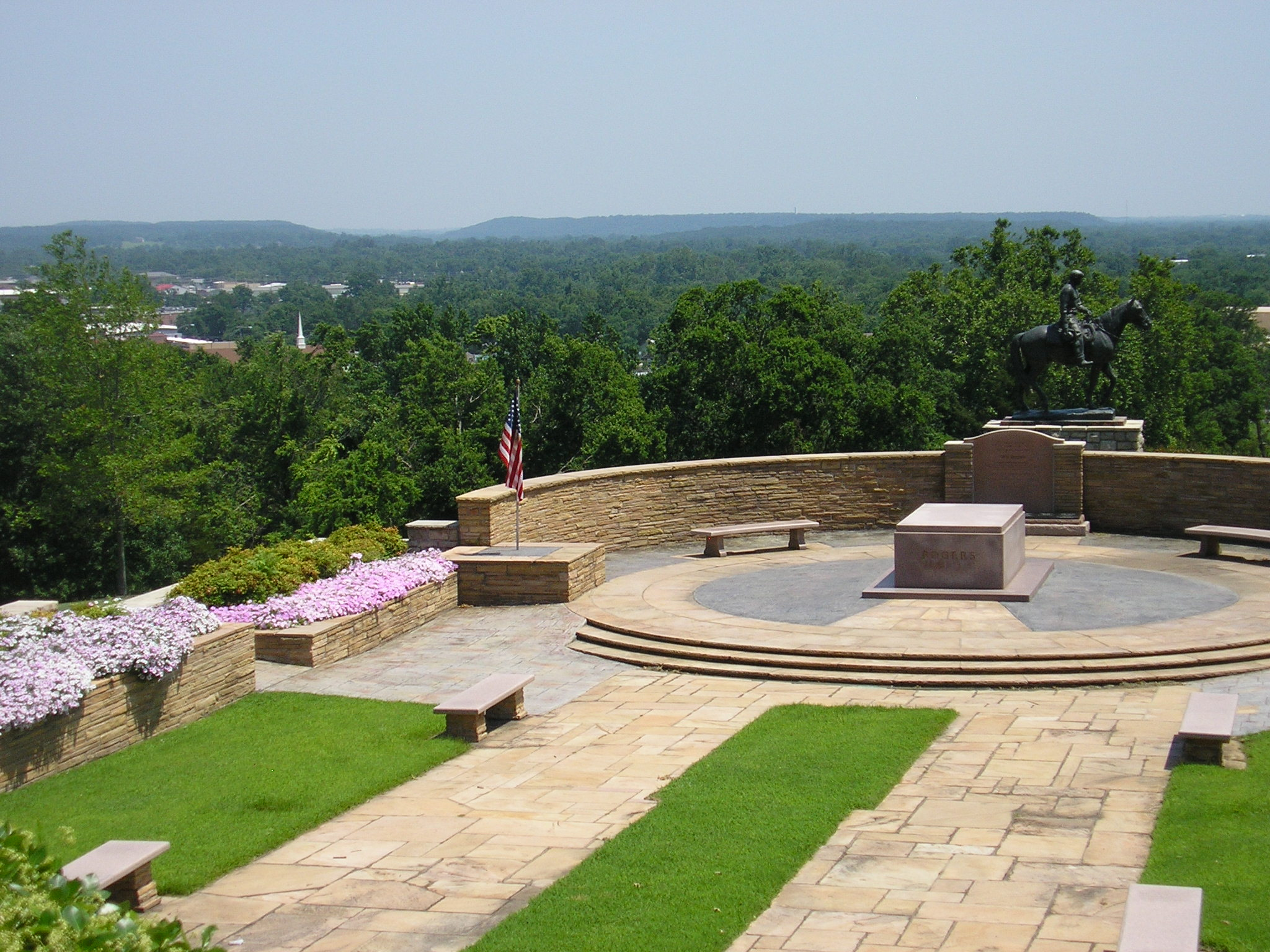
Hickory, pine, and oak forests dominate Northeastern Oklahoma, which receives far more rain than western areas of the state.

Oklahoma sits at a frequent crossroads between three different air masses: warm, humid air from the Gulf of Mexico; warm to hot, dry air from Mexico and the Southwestern U.S.; and cold, dry air from Canada. Especially from fall to spring, Oklahoma sees frequent air mass changes, which can produce drastic swings in both temperature and humidity. Much of the state is often subjected to extremes in temperature, wind, drought, and rainfall. Most of the state lies in an area known as Tornado Alley characterized by frequent interaction between cold and warm air masses, producing severe weather, with the highest-risk months from April to June. An average of 62 tornadoes strike the state per year, making that one of the highest rates in the world. Due to its position between zones of differing prevailing temperature and winds, weather patterns within the state can vary widely between relatively short distances. Precipitation occurs year-round, but average monthly precipitation is generally lowest in the winter months, rising dramatically to a peak in May (the year's wettest month virtually statewide, owing to frequent, and not uncommonly severe, thunderstorm activity), and decreases again by mid-summer, when long stretches of hot, dry weather are common in July and August many years. Early to mid-fall (September and October) often sees a secondary precipitation maximum. From late October to December, precipitation generally decreases again.

Eastern Oklahoma has a temperate humid subtropical climate (Köppen Cfa) heavily influenced by southerly winds bringing moisture from the Gulf of Mexico and has hot, humid summers and generally cold winters, but with cold spells, accompanied by snow, sleet or freezing rain. This transitions progressively to a semi-arid zone (Köppen BSk) in the high plains of the Panhandle, where a drier climate prevails, with somewhat-colder winters and similarly-hot summers but much lower humidity. Other central to western areas of the state, including Lawton and Enid in the transition zone, are also less affected by moisture from the Gulf of Mexico. They also tend to be drier than Oklahoma's eastern counties. Precipitation and temperatures fall from east to west accordingly, with areas in the southeast averaging an annual temperature of 62 °F (17 °C) and an annual rainfall of over 40 and as high as 56 inches (1,420 mm), while areas of the panhandle average 58 °F (14 °C), with an annual rainfall under 17 inches (430 mm). All of the state frequently experiences temperatures above 100 °F (38 °C), or below 0 °F (−18 °C) (though subzero temperatures are rare in southeastern Oklahoma), and snowfall ranges from an average of less than 4 inches (10 cm) in the far south to just over 20 inches (51 cm) on the border of Colorado in the panhandle. The state is home to the National Storm Prediction Center of the National Weather Service located in Norman. Winter and spring weather often are influenced by the El Niño Southern Oscillation. Winters during El Niño are cooler than average and wetter across the western portion of the state due to an amplified southern jet stream. During La Niña, the storm track is further north, therefore winters are warmer than average and drier in the western part of the state.

=== Climate data ===
8 to 10 inches (200 to 250 millimetres).

Climate data for Oklahoma
Month	Jan	Feb	Mar	Apr	May	Jun	Jul	Aug	Sep	Oct	Nov	Dec	Year
Record high °F (°C)	92 (33)	99 (37)	106 (41)	106 (41)	114 (46)	120 (49)	120 (49)	120 (49)	115 (46)	106 (41)	97 (36)	92 (33)	120 (49)
Mean daily maximum °F (°C)	50.0 (10.0)	54.6 (12.6)	63.4 (17.4)	72.2 (22.3)	80.0 (26.7)	88.7 (31.5)	93.8 (34.3)	92.9 (33.8)	85.1 (29.5)	73.9 (23.3)	61.5 (16.4)	51.3 (10.7)	72.3 (22.4)
Mean daily minimum °F (°C)	26.6 (−3.0)	30.3 (−0.9)	38.9 (3.8)	46.8 (8.2)	56.8 (13.8)	65.9 (18.8)	70.1 (21.2)	68.8 (20.4)	60.7 (15.9)	48.6 (9.2)	37.4 (3.0)	28.9 (−1.7)	48.3 (9.1)
Record low °F (°C)	−27 (−33)	−31 (−35)	−18 (−28)	6 (−14)	19 (−7)	34 (1)	41 (5)	38 (3)	25 (−4)	6 (−14)	−15 (−26)	−19 (−28)	−31 (−35)
Average precipitation inches (mm)	1.6 (41)	1.7 (43)	2.8 (71)	3.6 (91)	4.9 (120)	4.3 (110)	3.2 (81)	3.2 (81)	3.3 (84)	3.4 (86)	2.3 (58)	2.1 (53)	36.4 (919)
Source 1: Extreme Weather Watch
Source 2: NOAA

Climate data for Oklahoma City (Will Rogers World Airport), 1991−2020 normals, (Note: Mean monthly maxima and minima (i.e. the expected highest and lowest temperature readings at any point during the year or given month) calculated based on data at said location from 1991 to 2020.) extremes 1890−present (Note: Official records for Oklahoma City were kept at the Weather Bureau Office from November 1890 to December 1953, and at Will Rogers World Airport since January 1954. For more information, see Threadex)
Month	Jan	Feb	Mar	Apr	May	Jun	Jul	Aug	Sep	Oct	Nov	Dec	Year
Record high °F (°C)	83 (28)	92 (33)	97 (36)	100 (38)	104 (40)	107 (42)	110 (43)	113 (45)	108 (42)	97 (36)	87 (31)	86 (30)	113 (45)
Mean maximum °F (°C)	71.7 (22.1)	77.1 (25.1)	84.2 (29.0)	86.9 (30.5)	92.3 (33.5)	96.4 (35.8)	102.4 (39.1)	101.5 (38.6)	96.2 (35.7)	88.9 (31.6)	79.1 (26.2)	71.2 (21.8)	103.8 (39.9)
Mean daily maximum °F (°C)	49.3 (9.6)	53.8 (12.1)	62.9 (17.2)	71.1 (21.7)	78.9 (26.1)	87.5 (30.8)	93.1 (33.9)	92.2 (33.4)	83.9 (28.8)	72.8 (22.7)	60.7 (15.9)	50.4 (10.2)	71.4 (21.9)
Daily mean °F (°C)	38.2 (3.4)	42.3 (5.7)	51.2 (10.7)	59.3 (15.2)	68.2 (20.1)	76.9 (24.9)	81.7 (27.6)	80.7 (27.1)	72.7 (22.6)	61.1 (16.2)	49.2 (9.6)	40.0 (4.4)	60.1 (15.6)
Mean daily minimum °F (°C)	27.0 (−2.8)	30.8 (−0.7)	39.5 (4.2)	47.5 (8.6)	57.6 (14.2)	66.2 (19.0)	70.3 (21.3)	69.1 (20.6)	61.5 (16.4)	49.4 (9.7)	37.7 (3.2)	29.5 (−1.4)	48.8 (9.3)
Mean minimum °F (°C)	11.7 (−11.3)	15.4 (−9.2)	21.5 (−5.8)	32.3 (0.2)	43.8 (6.6)	56.6 (13.7)	63.6 (17.6)	61.7 (16.5)	48.4 (9.1)	33.8 (1.0)	21.7 (−5.7)	14.3 (−9.8)	7.5 (−13.6)
Record low °F (°C)	−11 (−24)	−17 (−27)	1 (−17)	20 (−7)	32 (0)	46 (8)	53 (12)	49 (9)	35 (2)	16 (−9)	9 (−13)	−8 (−22)	−17 (−27)
Average precipitation inches (mm)	1.32 (34)	1.42 (36)	2.55 (65)	3.60 (91)	5.31 (135)	4.49 (114)	3.59 (91)	3.60 (91)	3.72 (94)	3.32 (84)	1.68 (43)	1.79 (45)	36.39 (924)
Average snowfall inches (cm)	1.8 (4.6)	1.8 (4.6)	0.8 (2.0)	0.0 (0.0)	0.0 (0.0)	0.0 (0.0)	0.0 (0.0)	0.0 (0.0)	0.0 (0.0)	0.0 (0.0)	0.5 (1.3)	1.8 (4.6)	6.7 (17)
Average precipitation days (≥ 0.01 in)	5.0	5.7	6.9	7.9	10.0	8.6	6.0	6.7	7.1	7.5	5.8	5.7	82.9
Average snowy days (≥ 0.1 in)	1.3	1.3	0.4	0.1	0.0	0.0	0.0	0.0	0.0	0.1	0.3	1.4	4.9
Average relative humidity (%)	66.6	65.7	61.3	61.1	67.5	67.2	60.9	61.6	67.1	64.4	67.1	67.8	64.9
Average dew point °F (°C)	23.7 (−4.6)	28.0 (−2.2)	35.2 (1.8)	45.1 (7.3)	55.8 (13.2)	63.7 (17.6)	65.3 (18.5)	64.4 (18.0)	59.5 (15.3)	47.7 (8.7)	37.0 (2.8)	27.5 (−2.5)	46.1 (7.8)
Mean monthly sunshine hours	200.8	189.7	244.2	271.3	295.2	326.1	356.6	329.3	263.7	245.1	186.5	180.9	3,089.4
Mean daily daylight hours	10.1	10.9	12.0	13.1	14.1	14.5	14.3	13.4	12.4	11.3	10.3	9.8	12.2
Percentage possible sunshine	64	62	66	69	68	75	80	79	71	70	60	60	69
Average ultraviolet index	3	4	6	8	9	10	10	9	8	5	3	2	6.4
Source 1: NOAA (relative humidity and sun 1961−1990)
Source 2: Weather Atlas(Daylight-UV)

Climate data for Tulsa, Oklahoma (Tulsa Int'l), 1991–2020 normals, extremes 1893–present
Month	Jan	Feb	Mar	Apr	May	Jun	Jul	Aug	Sep	Oct	Nov	Dec	Year
Record high °F (°C)	82 (28)	90 (32)	99 (37)	102 (39)	100 (38)	108 (42)	113 (45)	115 (46)	109 (43)	98 (37)	89 (32)	80 (27)	115 (46)
Mean maximum °F (°C)	70.1 (21.2)	74.9 (23.8)	83.4 (28.6)	86.8 (30.4)	91.3 (32.9)	95.4 (35.2)	101.9 (38.8)	102.2 (39.0)	96.2 (35.7)	88.2 (31.2)	79.0 (26.1)	70.1 (21.2)	103.9 (39.9)
Mean daily maximum °F (°C)	48.9 (9.4)	54.0 (12.2)	63.3 (17.4)	72.1 (22.3)	79.7 (26.5)	88.4 (31.3)	93.6 (34.2)	93.0 (33.9)	84.8 (29.3)	73.6 (23.1)	61.4 (16.3)	50.9 (10.5)	72.0 (22.2)
Daily mean °F (°C)	38.5 (3.6)	42.8 (6.0)	52.0 (11.1)	60.8 (16.0)	69.6 (20.9)	78.6 (25.9)	83.4 (28.6)	82.2 (27.9)	73.8 (23.2)	62.3 (16.8)	50.4 (10.2)	41.0 (5.0)	61.3 (16.3)
Mean daily minimum °F (°C)	28.0 (−2.2)	31.7 (−0.2)	40.7 (4.8)	49.5 (9.7)	59.5 (15.3)	68.7 (20.4)	73.1 (22.8)	71.5 (21.9)	62.8 (17.1)	50.9 (10.5)	39.4 (4.1)	31.1 (−0.5)	50.6 (10.3)
Mean minimum °F (°C)	10.4 (−12.0)	13.5 (−10.3)	22.9 (−5.1)	33.5 (0.8)	44.8 (7.1)	56.4 (13.6)	63.4 (17.4)	60.5 (15.8)	46.0 (7.8)	34.5 (1.4)	23.4 (−4.8)	12.6 (−10.8)	4.6 (−15.2)
Record low °F (°C)	−16 (−27)	−15 (−26)	−3 (−19)	22 (−6)	32 (0)	49 (9)	51 (11)	48 (9)	35 (2)	15 (−9)	10 (−12)	−8 (−22)	−16 (−27)
Average precipitation inches (mm)	1.63 (41)	1.62 (41)	3.10 (79)	4.37 (111)	5.73 (146)	4.65 (118)	3.76 (96)	3.38 (86)	3.85 (98)	3.78 (96)	2.66 (68)	2.43 (62)	40.96 (1,042)
Average snowfall inches (cm)	2.7 (6.9)	1.8 (4.6)	2.1 (5.3)	trace	0 (0)	0 (0)	0 (0)	0 (0)	0 (0)	trace	0.7 (1.8)	2.3 (5.8)	9.6 (24)
Average precipitation days (≥ 0.01 in)	6.1	6.6	8.7	8.5	10.5	9.8	6.4	6.6	8.0	7.9	6.8	7.0	92.9
Average snowy days (≥ 0.1 in)	1.9	1.3	0.6	0	0	0	0	0	0	0	0.2	1.6	5.6
Average relative humidity (%)	66.7	65.2	61.6	61.2	69.1	69.3	63.6	64.5	70.1	66.4	67.4	68.5	66.1
Mean monthly sunshine hours	175.8	171.7	219.6	244.4	266.7	294.8	334.7	305.3	232.5	218.6	161.1	160.8	2,786
Percentage possible sunshine	57	56	59	62	61	67	75	73	63	63	52	53	63
Source: NOAA (relative humidity and sun 1961–1990)

Climate data for Guymon, Oklahoma
Month	Jan	Feb	Mar	Apr	May	Jun	Jul	Aug	Sep	Oct	Nov	Dec	Year
Record high °F (°C)	83 (28)	84 (29)	93 (34)	96 (36)	108 (42)	108 (42)	107 (42)	108 (42)	106 (41)	98 (37)	86 (30)	86 (30)	108 (42)
Mean daily maximum °F (°C)	48 (9)	52 (11)	58 (14)	69 (21)	78 (26)	89 (32)	93 (34)	92 (33)	85 (29)	74 (23)	59 (15)	51 (11)	71 (22)
Mean daily minimum °F (°C)	21 (−6)	25 (−4)	29 (−2)	41 (5)	50 (10)	61 (16)	65 (18)	65 (18)	56 (13)	44 (7)	30 (−1)	24 (−4)	43 (6)
Record low °F (°C)	−19 (−28)	−11 (−24)	−7 (−22)	17 (−8)	28 (−2)	41 (5)	48 (9)	46 (8)	31 (−1)	24 (−4)	4 (−16)	0 (−18)	−19 (−28)
Average precipitation inches (mm)	0.5 (13)	0.9 (23)	0.8 (20)	1.7 (43)	3.1 (79)	2.5 (64)	3.5 (89)	2.8 (71)	1.9 (48)	1.8 (46)	0.8 (20)	0.6 (15)	20.9 (530)
Average snowfall inches (cm)	3.2 (8.1)	3.9 (9.9)	3.3 (8.4)	1 (2.5)	0.1 (0.25)	0 (0)	0 (0)	0 (0)	0 (0)	0.2 (0.51)	1.3 (3.3)	3.5 (8.9)	16.5 (42)
Average rainy days	1.6	2.6	2.2	4.3	6.2	4.9	6.2	5.4	3.6	3.4	2	2	44.4
Average relative humidity (%)	75	71	62	67	59	58	58	54	55	61	58	73	63
Source 1: weather.com
Source 2: Weatherbase.com

Climate data for Lawton, Oklahoma (Elevation 1,150 ft)
Month	Jan	Feb	Mar	Apr	May	Jun	Jul	Aug	Sep	Oct	Nov	Dec	Year
Record high °F (°C)	85 (29)	97 (36)	98 (37)	100 (38)	113 (45)	114 (46)	114 (46)	120 (49)	110 (43)	104 (40)	97 (36)	88 (31)	120 (49)
Mean daily maximum °F (°C)	51.8 (11.0)	57.1 (13.9)	65.5 (18.6)	74.9 (23.8)	82.3 (27.9)	90.8 (32.7)	96.2 (35.7)	96.1 (35.6)	87.9 (31.1)	77.2 (25.1)	63.8 (17.7)	53.7 (12.1)	74.8 (23.8)
Mean daily minimum °F (°C)	27.1 (−2.7)	31.2 (−0.4)	38.9 (3.8)	49.0 (9.4)	58.2 (14.6)	66.8 (19.3)	70.7 (21.5)	69.8 (21.0)	62.2 (16.8)	50.6 (10.3)	38.2 (3.4)	29.8 (−1.2)	49.4 (9.7)
Record low °F (°C)	−11 (−24)	−12 (−24)	6 (−14)	22 (−6)	30 (−1)	45 (7)	52 (11)	46 (8)	35 (2)	16 (−9)	11 (−12)	−8 (−22)	−11 (−24)
Average precipitation inches (mm)	1.19 (30)	1.36 (35)	2.00 (51)	2.84 (72)	4.97 (126)	3.77 (96)	2.33 (59)	2.38 (60)	3.24 (82)	3.30 (84)	1.71 (43)	1.54 (39)	30.62 (778)
Average snowfall inches (cm)	1.4 (3.6)	1.3 (3.3)	0.5 (1.3)	0 (0)	0 (0)	0 (0)	0 (0)	0 (0)	0 (0)	0 (0)	0.1 (0.25)	0.6 (1.5)	4.0 (10)
Average precipitation days (≥ 0.01 in)	4.2	4.3	6.2	6.1	7.8	7.3	4.7	5.6	6.3	5.7	4.9	4.3	67.4
Average snowy days (≥ 0.1 in)	0.3	0.3	0	0	0	0	0	0	0	0	0	0.1	0.7
Source: The Western Regional Climate Center

== See also ==
- 2009–19 Oklahoma earthquake swarms
- Geology of Oklahoma
- List of Oklahoma tri-points
- Zodletone Mountain
