= Demographics of Oklahoma =

Oklahoma Population Density Map (2010)

According to the U.S. Census Bureau, as of 2020, the state of Oklahoma had a population of 3,959,353, which is an increase of 208,002 or 5.54% since the year 2010. Oklahoma is the 28th most populous state in the United States.

== Population ==
Historical population
Census	Pop.	Note	%±
1890	258,657		—
1900	790,391		205.6%
1910	1,657,155		109.7%
1920	2,028,283		22.4%
1930	2,396,040		18.1%
1940	2,336,434		−2.5%
1950	2,233,351		−4.4%
1960	2,328,284		4.3%
1970	2,559,229		9.9%
1980	3,025,290		18.2%
1990	3,145,585		4.0%
2000	3,450,654		9.7%
2010	3,751,351		8.7%
2020	3,959,353		5.5%
2025 (est.)	4,123,288		4.1%
Source: 1910–2020, 2025

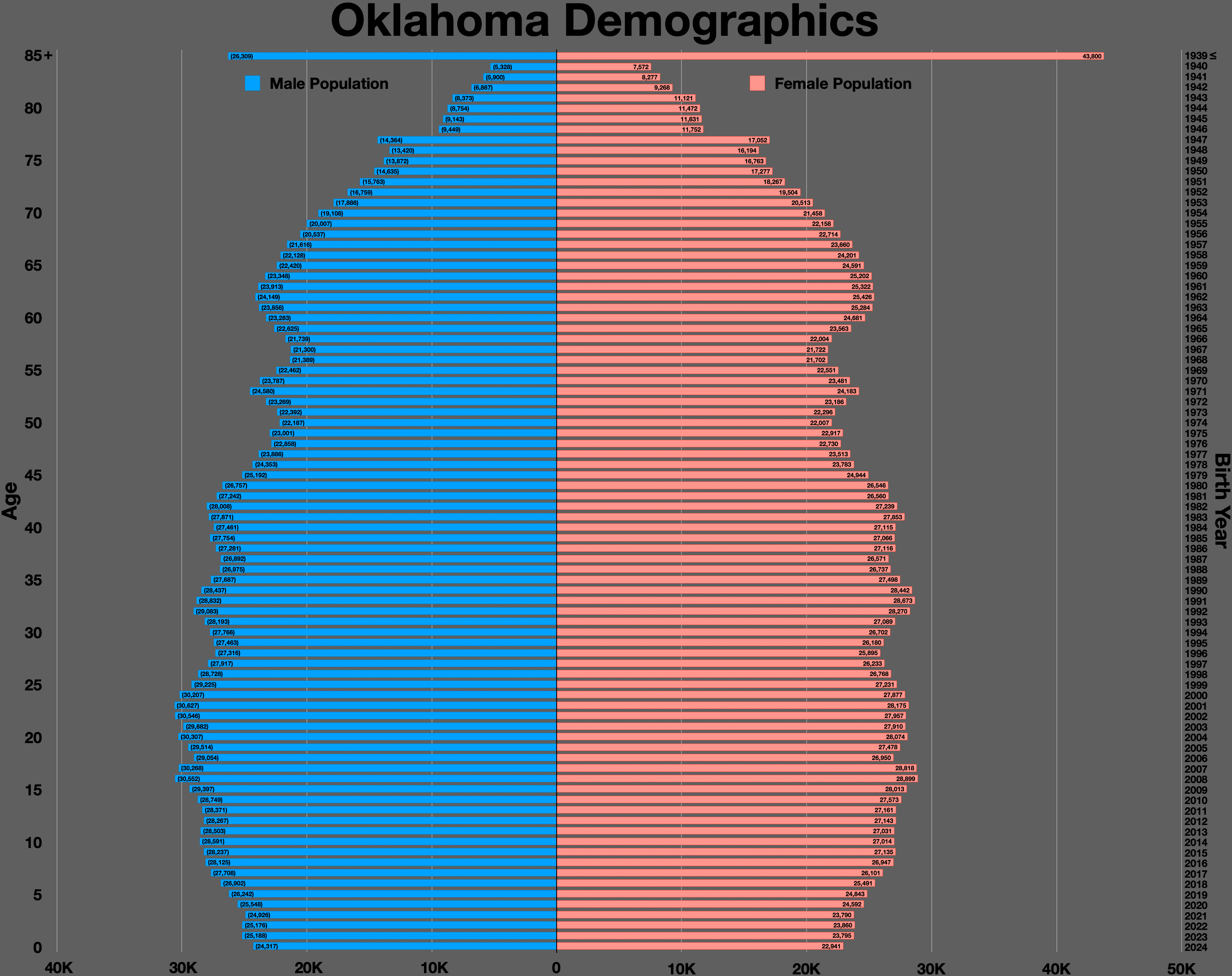
Oklahoma population pyramid

Distribution of languages of Oklahoma (2000)
English	92.6%
Spanish	4.4%
Cherokee	0.6%
German	0.4%
Vietnamese	0.4%
French	0.3%
Chinese	0.2%
Korean	0.1%
Arabic	0.1%
Tagalog	0.1%
Japanese	0.1%

The United States Census Bureau estimates that the population of Oklahoma was 3,911,338 on July 1, 2015, a 4.26% increase since the 2010 United States census.

According to the U.S. Census, as of 2010, Oklahoma has a historical estimated population of 3,751,351 which is an increase of 300,058 or 8.7 percent, since the year 2000. Oklahoma ranks first in the Great Plains region in terms of population, followed by Kansas, Nebraska, South Dakota, and North Dakota. There has historically been a lot of German American, Irish American and English American immigration to what is now the state of Oklahoma. There is also a significant Mexican population in Oklahoma. Oklahoma has a large Native American population.

In the state, the population was spread out, with 24.8% under the age of 18, 10.2% from 18 to 24, 25.8% from 25 to 44, 25.8% from 45 to 64, and 13.5% who were 65 years of age or older. The median age was 36.2 years. For every 100 females there were 98.0 males. For every 100 females age 18 and over, there were 95.8 males. There were 1,460,450 households, out of which 29.4% had children under the age of 18 living with them, 49.5% were married couples living together, 12.3% had a female householder with no husband present, and 33.2% were non-families. Of all households, 27.5% were made up of individuals, and 9.9% had someone living alone who was 65 years of age or older. The average household size was 2.49 and the average family size was 3.04.

It was estimated in 2010, that 5.5% of Oklahoma's residents, 206,382 were foreign born. Of them 31.9% were Naturalized US citizens and 68.1% were Not a US citizen.

The median income for a household in the state was $42,072, and the median income for a family was $51,958 (these figures have risen to 44,287 and 55,296 respectively in 2011). The per capita income for the state was $22,254 (risen to 26,192). It was estimated that 16.9% (has decreased to 16.3%, in 2011) of the population were below the poverty line. Out of the total population, 24.7% of those under the age of 18 and 15.4% of those 65 and older were living below the poverty line.

As of 2010, about 81.1% of the state's civilian non-institutionalized population has health coverage with 61.8% with private insurance and 31.3% with public coverage. About 18.9% of the state's population has no health insurance coverage and 10.0% of all children 18 years and younger in Oklahoma have no health insurance.

The center of population of Oklahoma is located at 35.598464 N, -96.836786 W, in Lincoln County near the town of Sparks.

== Vital statistics ==
Year	Population	Live births	Deaths	Natural change	Crude birth rate (per 1,000)	Crude death rate (per 1,000)	Natural change (per 1,000)	Crude migration change (per 1,000)
2000	3,454,365	49,782	35,079	14,703	14.4	10.2	4.2	
2001	3,467,100	50,118	34,682	15,436	14.5	10.0	4.5	-0.8
2002	3,489,080	50,387	35,502	14,885	14.4	10.2	4.2	2.0
2003	3,504,892	50,981	35,721	15,260	14.5	10.2	4.3	0.2
2004	3,525,233	51,306	34,483	16,823	14.6	9.8	4.8	1.0
2005	3,548,597	51,801	36,180	15,621	14.6	10.2	4.4	2.2
2006	3,594,090	54,016	35,427	18,589	15.0	9.9	5.1	7.5
2007	3,634,349	55,065	36,032	19,033	15.2	9.9	5.3	5.8
2008	3,668,976	54,781	37,014	17,767	14.9	10.1	4.8	4.6
2009	3,717,572	54,553	35,601	18,952	14.7	9.6	5.1	8.0
2010	3,759,558	53,238	36,529	16,709	14.2	9.7	4.5	6.7
2011	3,786,536	52,272	37,175	15,097	13.8	9.8	4.0	3.1
2012	3,815,196	52,751	36,870	15,881	13.8	9.7	4.1	3.3
2013	3,847,936	53,369	38,384	14,985	13.9	10.0	3.9	4.6
2014	3,871,400	53,339	38,464	14,875	13.8	9.9	3.9	2.2
2015	3,900,900	53,122	39,422	13,700	13.6	10.1	3.5	4.1
2016	3,916,688	52,592	39,276	13,316	13.4	10.0	3.4	0.6
2017	3,920,316	50,214	40,452	9,762	12.8	10.3	2.5	-1.6
2018	3,928,371	49,800	40,933	8,867	12.7	10.4	2.3	-0.2
2019	3,943,727	49,143	40,930	8,213	12.5	10.4	2.1	1.8
2020	3,965,243	47,623	47,809	-186	12.0	12.1	-0.1	5.5
2021	3,992,760	48,410	50,945	-2,535	12.1	12.8	-0.7	7.5
2022	4,025,327	48,332	47,976	356	12.0	11.9	0.1	8.0
2023	4,062,716	47,909	44,172	3,737	11.8	10.9	0.9	8.3
2024	4,097,758	47,962	45,056	2,906	11.7	11.0	0.7	7.8
2025	4,123,288	48,530	45,685	2,845	11.8	11.1	0.7	5.5

== Age ==
Out of the 3,956,971 people who lived in Oklahoma when the 2019 census was taken, the age breakdown is as follows. There were 251,083 individuals under the age of 5, amounting to 6.3% of Oklahoma’s population. In the 5-9 year old age group, there were 262,753 people which made up 6.6% of the population. The next age group is 10 to 14 years old at 7.1% equaling 280,191 individuals. Those who were between the ages of 15 and 19 made up 6.9% of the population which is 273, 627 people. In the 20-24 year old age group, there were 270,073 individuals, amounting to 6.8% of the population. The next age group is 25 to 34 years old and is the largest one, sitting at 13.6% and consisting of 536,999 people. In the 35-44 year old age group, there were 501,516 people which made up 12.7% of the population. Those who were between the ages of 45 and 54 made up 11.4% of the population which is 452,720 people. The next age group is 55 to 59 years old with 249,998 people and a percentage of 6.3%. In the 60-64 year old age group, there were 242,789 individuals which made up 6.1% of the population. Those who were between the ages of 65 and 74 made up 9.3% of the population which is 368,463 people. The next age group is 75 to 84 years old at 4.9% equaling 192,486 individuals. The last and smallest group are those over 85 years old consisting of 74,273 people which is 1.9% of the population. The median age in Oklahoma is 37 which is a year and a half less than the United States average.

In 2000, 6.8% of Oklahoma's population was reported as under 5, 25.9% under 18, and 13.2% was 65 or older. Females made up approximately 50.9% of the population. The state has an above-average birth rate than most of the United States.

== Gender ==
According to the most recent census, there were 3,956,971 people living in Oklahoma in 2019. Out of this group, 1,962,477 of them were male and 1,994,494 were female. In percentages, this comes out to 50.5% being female, leaving 49.5% for the male population. This means that for every 100 females that live in Oklahoma, there are 98.4 males. This number does change throughout age groups, though: for every 100 females in the 65 years and above age group, there are 80.8 males and for people who are 18 or older, there are 95.8 males for every 100 females. This data shows us that as groups of people get older, the gender ratio begins to weigh more and more heavily female as time goes on. Out of the total number of 327,229 firms that existed in 2012, 174,395 of them were owned by men and 105,168 were owned by women (the remaining number being co-owned).

== Race and ethnicity ==
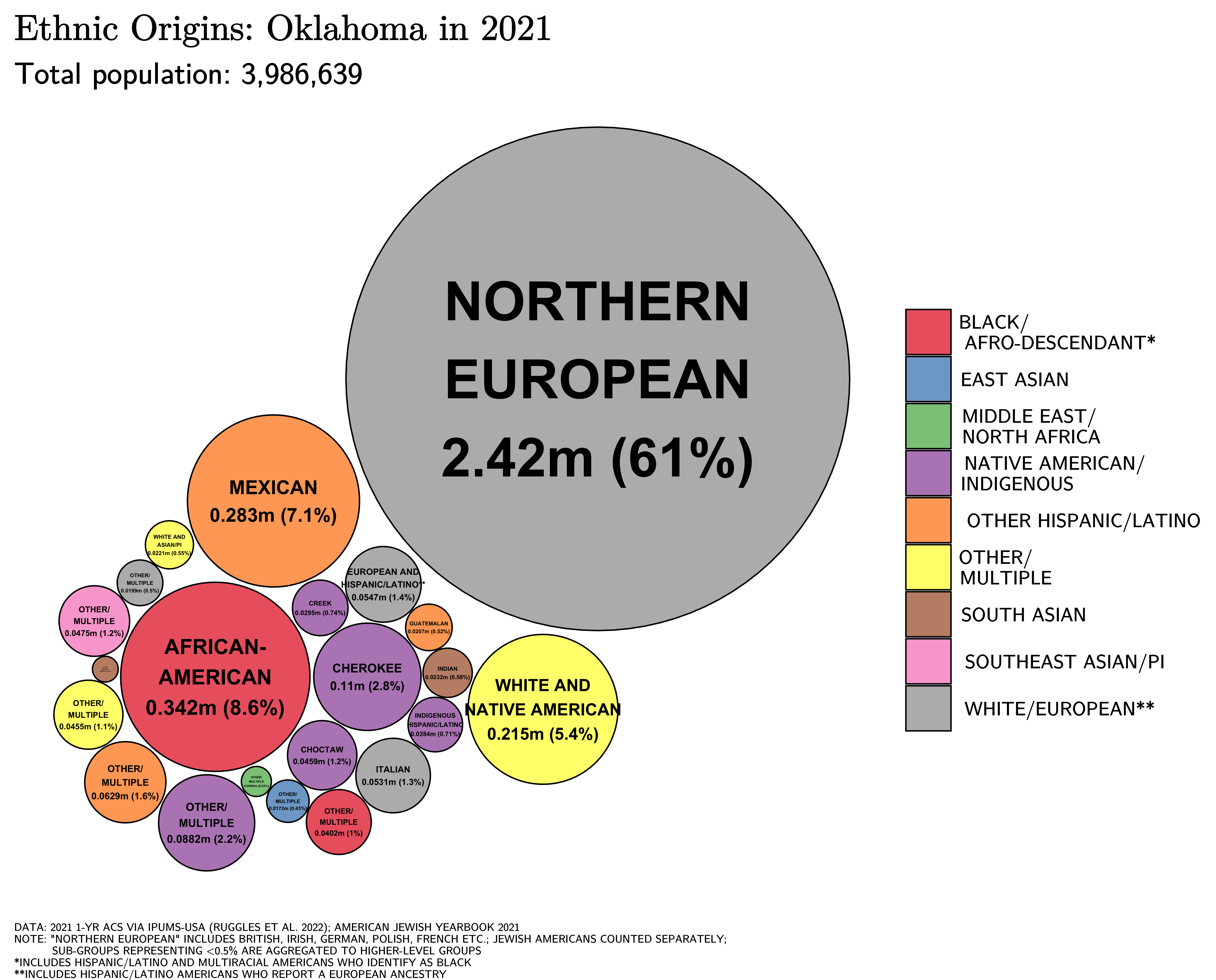
Ethnic origins in Oklahoma

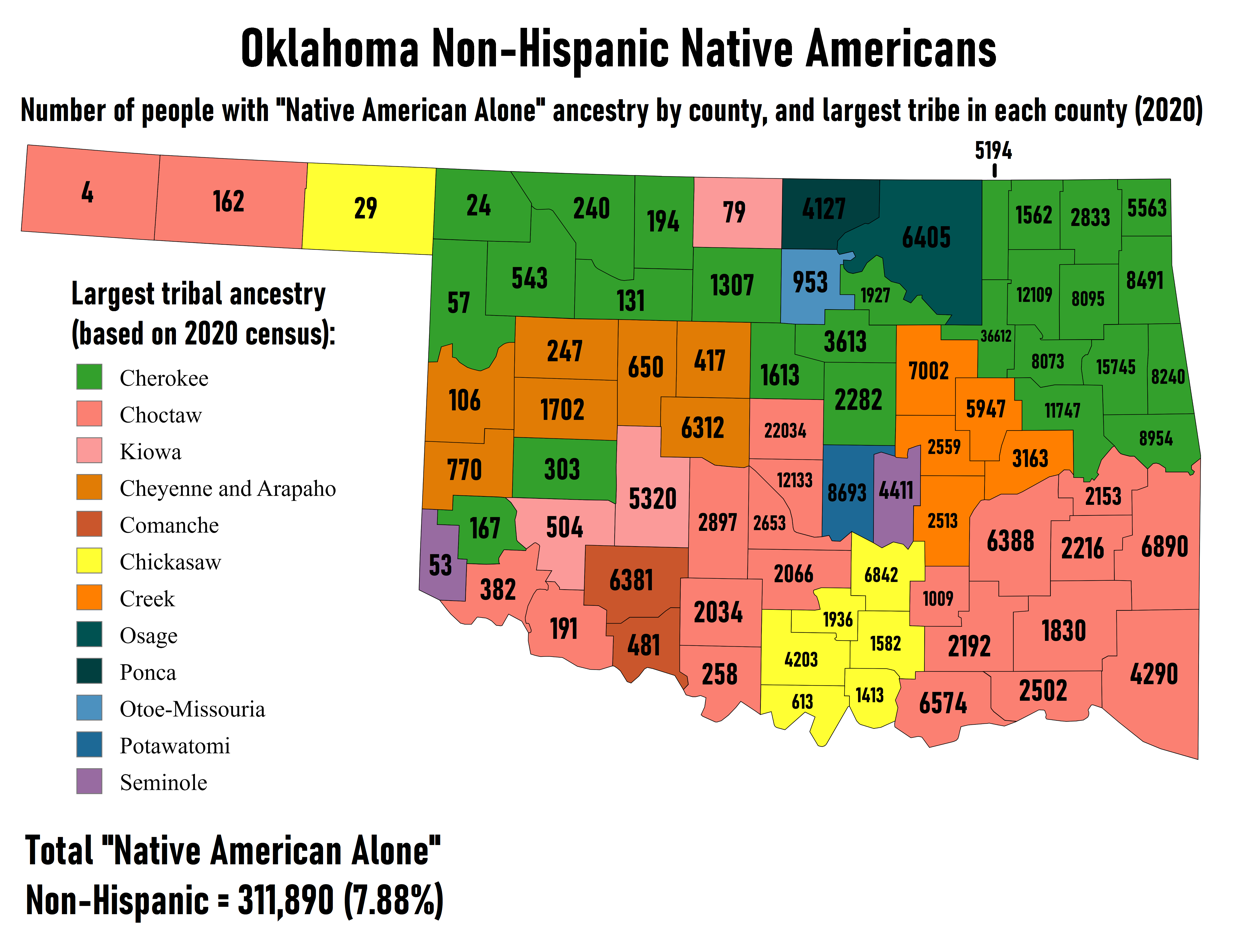
Largest Non-Hispanic Native American ancestry by county and numbers of people reporting "Native American Alone"

==== 2025 American Community Survey one-year estimates ====
Racial Makeup of Oklahoma (2025): 1. White alone (61.1%); 2. Black alone (6.58%); 3. Native American alone (8.10%); 4. Asian Alone (2.51%); 5. Pacific Islander Alone (0.20%); 6. Other race alone (4.41%); 7. Two or more races (17.1%)	Racial/Ethnic Makeup of Oklahoma excluding Hispanics from racial categories (2025); NH=Non-Hispanic: 1. White NH (57.9%); 2. Black NH (6.40%); 3. Native American NH (7.42%); 4. Asian NH (2.50%); 5. Pacific Islander NH (0.20%); 6. Other race NH (0.32%); 7. Two or more races NH (11.3%); 8. Hispanic Any Race (14.0%)	Racial Makeup of Hispanics in Oklahoma (2025): 1. White alone (22.7%); 2. Black alone (1.31%); 3. Native American alone (4.87%); 4. Asian Alone (0.09%); 5. Pacific Islander Alone (0.00%); 6. Other race alone (29.2%); 7. Two or more races (41.8%)

According to the 2019 census, the people who reported that their only race was white consisted of about 74% of the population. The percentage of people whose race is Black or African American was 7.8% in the 2019 census. Those who are American Indian or Alaska Native made up 9.4% of the population. The percentage of people who are Native Hawaiian or Pacific Islander consisted of 0.2% of the population and the Asian percentage was 2.4%. Those who reported two or more races made up 6.3% of the population and the percentage of people who were Hispanic or Latino was 11.1%. Out of those who are American Indian, 125,503 people are from the Cherokee tribe, 441 belong to the Chippewa tribe, 697 are from the Navajo tribe and 1,275 are from the Sioux tribe. Out of those from Asian descent, 12,789 people are Asian Indian, 9,134 are Chinese, 9,436 are Filipino, 2,785 are Japanese, 5,037 are Korean and 25,455 are Vietnamese. Out of those who are Native Hawaiian and other Pacific Islander, 1,180 are Native Hawaiian, 972 are Guamanian or Chamorro and 287 are Samoan. Out of the total number of 327,229 firms that existed in 2012, 64,875 of these were owned by minorities while 249,027 were owned by non minorities (the remaining number being co-owned).

According to the 2010 United States census, the racial and ethnic composition of Oklahoma was the following:

- White: 74.0%
- Native American: 9.4%
- Black or African American: 7.8%
- Two or more races: 6.3%
- Asian: 2.4% (0.4% Vietnamese, 0.3% Indian, 0.2% Chinese, 0.2% Korean, 0.2% Filipino, 0.1% Hmong, 0.1% Japanese)
- Pacific Islander: 0.2%

Ethnically, the Hispanic or Latinos (of any race) make up 11.1% of the population. Major ancestry groups of the Hispanic population include: 7.1% Mexican, 0.3% Puerto Rican, 0.2% Spanish, 0.2% Guatemalan, 0.1% Salvadoran, 0.1% Cuban.

An estimated 7.4 percent of Oklahomans are African American. African Americans are a plurality in southeast Lawton, northeast Oklahoma City, northwest Tulsa, and portions of Muskogee. In Tulsa, prior to the Tulsa race massacre, the historic Black community of Greenwood was once prosperous enough to earn the nickname "the Black Wall Street" in the 1920s.

In 2010, Oklahoma had the second-largest Native American population after California, with the highest concentration found in the Tulsa-Broken Arrow metropolitan area (8.3%). As a percentage of population, Oklahoma ranked fourth behind Alaska, New Mexico, and South Dakota with 8.57%. The large Native American population in Oklahoma is largely the result of the Trail of Tears, a series of forced relocations of Native Americans from southeastern states in the 19th century. There are 283,000 Cherokee Nation citizens in Oklahoma and up to 10% of the state population are of any Cherokee descent or ancestry.

Asian Americans and Pacific Islanders are mostly concentrated in the Oklahoma City−Norman metropolitan area. Oklahoma City, Norman, and Edmond, which are located within Oklahoma and Cleveland counties have sizable Vietnamese and Indian communities, as well as a significant Korean community that is present there. Oklahoma is also home to a large and growing Hmong (3369) and Burmese (1146) population, more than half of whom reside in the Tulsa-Broken Arrow metropolitan area.

As of 2010, the largest ancestry groups in Oklahoma were:

- 14.6% German
- 12.6% Irish
- 11.0% Native American (some areas of Eastern Oklahoma are predominantly Native American)
- 9.6% American (most Oklahomans who cite American are primarily of English, Scottish, and Welsh ancestries)
- 8.2% English
- 7.1% Mexican
- 2.4% French
- 2.0% Dutch
- 1.8% Scottish
- 1.7% Italian
- 1.2% Scots-Irish

Demographics of Oklahoma (csv)
By race	White	Black	AIAN*	Asian	NHPI*
2000 (total population)	82.59%	8.31%	11.39%	1.71%	0.15%
2000 (Hispanic only)	4.73%	0.19%	0.37%	0.05%	0.02%
2005 (total population)	82.20%	8.55%	11.31%	1.92%	0.16%
2005 (Hispanic only)	6.10%	0.24%	0.35%	0.06%	0.03%
Growth 2000–05 (total population)	2.33%	5.76%	2.04%	15.49%	9.51%
Growth 2000–05 (non-Hispanic only)	0.50%	5.17%	2.22%	15.19%	9.47%
Growth 2000–05 (Hispanic only)	32.58%	31.44%	-3.27%	25.17%	9.69%
* AIAN is American Indian or Alaskan Native; NHPI is Native Hawaiian or Pacific Islander

== Education ==
According to the 2019 census, the percentage of people over 25 years old who had graduated high school by the time the 2019 census was taken was at about 88%. The percentage of people over 25 with at least a bachelor's degree or higher was 25.5%.

== Cities and towns ==
Oklahoma had 598 incorporated places in 2010, including three cities over 100,000 in population and 40 over 10,000. Two of the fifty largest cities in the United States are located in Oklahoma, Oklahoma City and Tulsa, and 58 percent of Oklahomans live within their metropolitan areas, or spheres of economic and social influence defined by the United States Census Bureau as a metropolitan statistical area. Oklahoma City, the state's capital and largest city, had the largest metropolitan area in the state in 2010, with 1,252,987 people, and the metropolitan area of Tulsa had 937,478 residents.

Oklahoma's largest cities in 2010 were: Oklahoma City (579,999), Tulsa (391,906), Norman (110,925), Broken Arrow (98,850), Lawton (96,867), Edmond (81,405), Moore (55,081), Midwest City (54,371), Enid (49,379), and Stillwater (45,688). Between 2000 and 2010, the cities that led the state in population growth were Blanchard 172.4%, Elgin 78.2%, Piedmont 56.7%, Bixby 56.6%, and Owasso 56.3%.

== Housing ==
The number of individual housing units as of July 1, 2019 was 1,749,464. The percentage of housing units occupied by the owner of the property was 65.6%. The median value of these housing units occupied by their owners was $136,800 as of 2019. The median rent, not including tax or any other additions, each month was about $810. There was an average of 2.58 people living in each household in 2019 and 83.2% of all people living in houses were living in the same house that they occupied 12 months ago.

== Finance ==
The median household income at the time the 2019 census was taken was $52,919. The per capita income from the time that they answered spanning back over the previous 12 months averaged at about $28,422 and the percentage of people living in poverty out of the population mentioned earlier was 15.2%.

Oklahoma has dealt with many socioeconomic issues, as the state's rank of annual household income is below national average and the state's poverty rate exceeds 15 percent, higher in rural areas. The state's 2000 per capita personal income was $23,517, 43rd in the nation. However, Oklahoma's cost of living index also among the lowest in the nation. Oklahoma City suburb Nichols Hills is ranked first on Oklahoma locations by per capita income at $73,661.

== Births data ==
Note: Births in table don't add up, because Hispanics are counted both by their ethnicity and by their race, giving a higher overall number.

Live births by single race/ethnicity of mother
Race	2014	2015	2016	2017	2018	2019	2020	2021	2022	2023	2024
White	33,577 (63.0%)	33,293 (62.7%)	30,499 (58.0%)	28,976 (57.7%)	28,444 (57.1%)	27,427 (55.8%)	26,290 (55.2%)	26,522 (54.8%)	26,224 (54.3%)	25,483 (53.2%)	25,060 (52.2%)
American Indian	6,051 (11.3%)	5,924 (11.1%)	4,939 (9.4%)	4,846 (9.7%)	4,771 (9.6%)	4,889 (9.9%)	4,367 (9.2%)	4,566 (9.4%)	4,355 (9.0%)	4,093 (8.5%)	4,046 (8.4%)
Black	5,296 (9.9%)	5,293 (10.0%)	4,394 (8.3%)	4,085 (8.1%)	4,136 (8.3%)	4,101 (8.3%)	3,944 (8.3%)	3,826 (7.9%)	3,689 (7.6%)	3,683 (7.7%)	3,374 (7.0%)
Asian	1,734 (3.2%)	1,762 (3.3%)	1,377 (2.6%)	1,328 (2.6%)	1,306 (2.6%)	1,251 (2.5%)	1,282 (2.7%)	1,203 (2.5%)	1,310 (2.7%)	1,329 (2.8%)	1,314 (2.7%)
Hispanic (any race)	7,219 (13.5%)	7,406 (13.9%)	7,544 (14.3%)	7,441 (14.8%)	7,545 (15.2%)	7,713 (15.7%)	7,561 (15.9%)	8,135 (16.8%)	8,462 (17.5%)	8,809 (18.4%)	9,335 (19.5%)
Total	53,339 (100%)	53,122 (100%)	52,592 (100%)	50,214 (100%)	49,800 (100%)	49,143 (100%)	47,623 (100%)	48,410 (100%)	48,332 (100%)	47,909 (100%)	47,962 (100%)

- Since 2016, data for births of White Hispanic origin are not collected, but included in one Hispanic group; persons of Hispanic origin may be of any race.
