= List of earthquakes in Oklahoma =

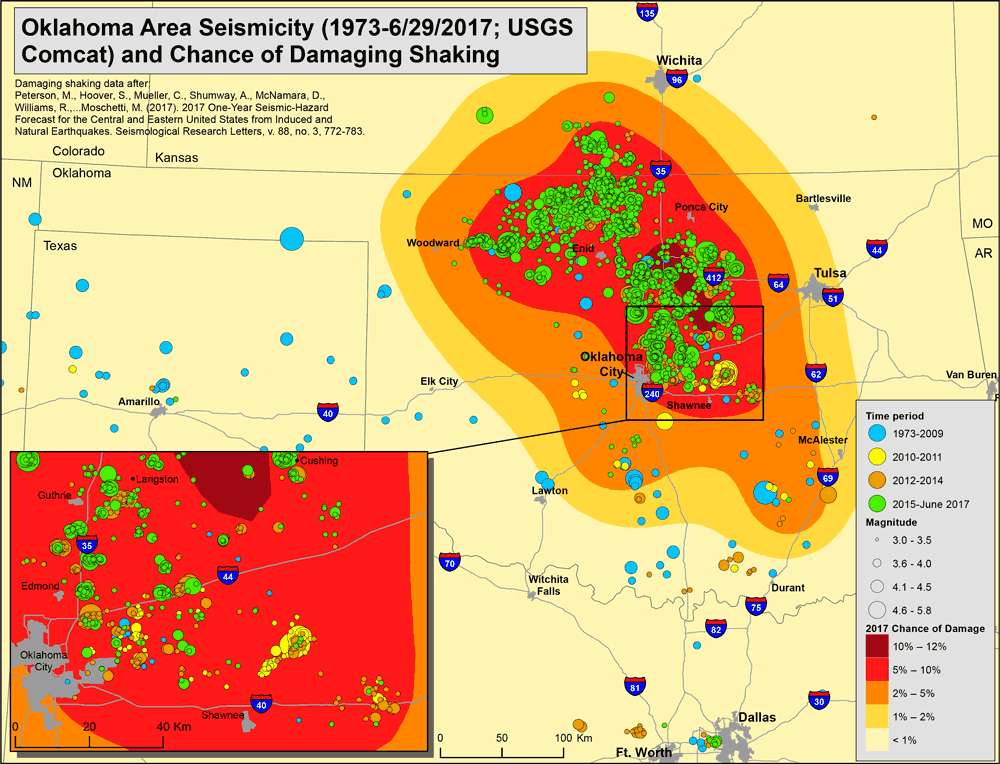
Seismic hazard and seismicity map for Oklahoma and vicinity for the year 2017 – incorporates hazard from induced seismicity

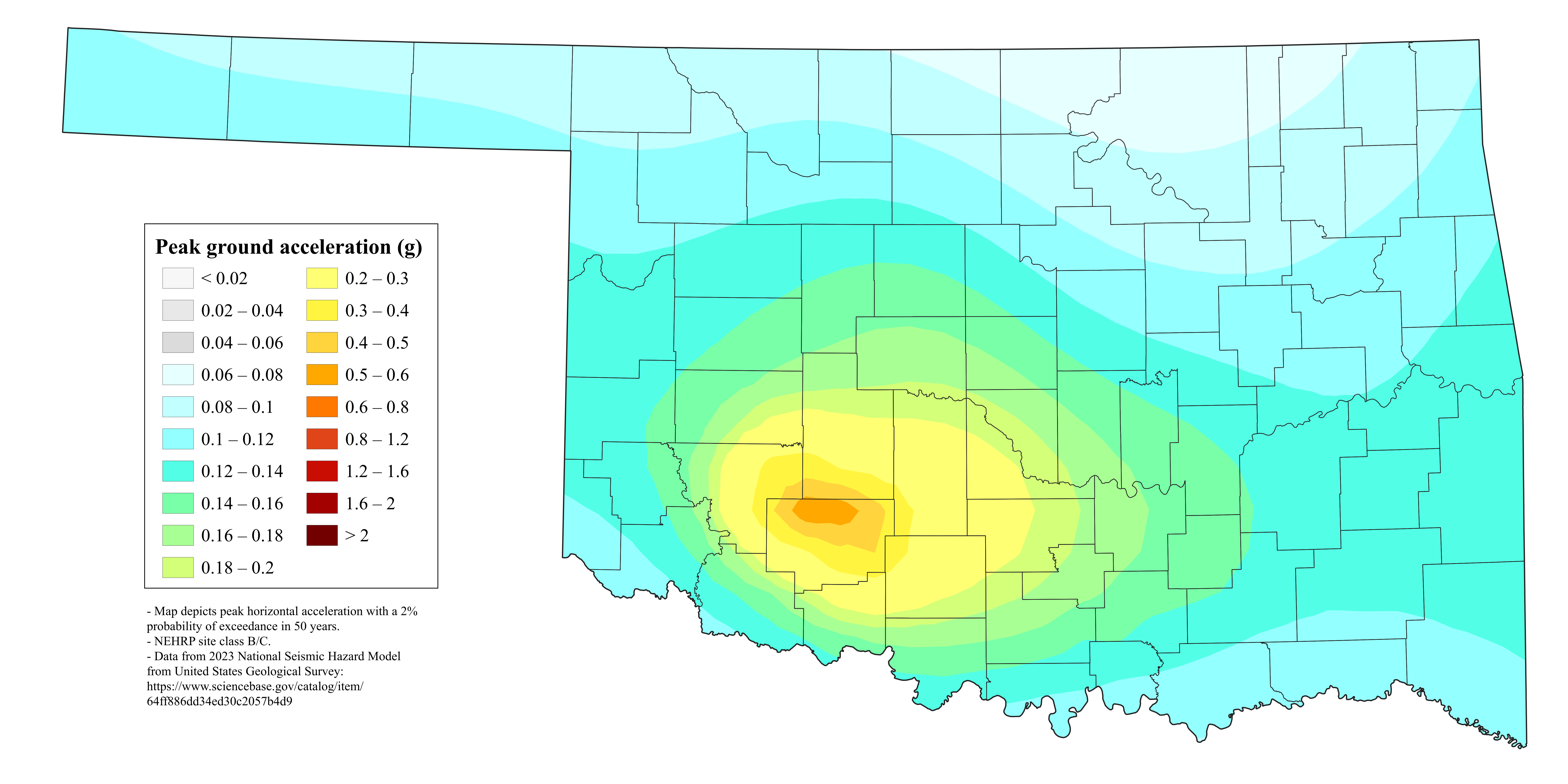
2023 National Seismic Hazard Model in Oklahoma from the United States Geological Survey – does not incorporate hazard from induced seismicity

The following is a list of historical earthquakes with epicenters located within the boundaries of Oklahoma. Only earthquakes of greater than or equal to magnitude 4.5 are included. Information pertaining to time, magnitude, epicenter, and depth is retrieved from the United States Geological Survey or, when USGS information is unavailable, the Oklahoma Geological Survey where applicable. All times are given in Coordinated Universal Time (UTC) rather than local time (CT).

== Earthquakes ==
Date (UTC)	Time (UTC)	Area	Magnitude	Epicenter	Depth (km)	Article link	Source
~1,100 years ago	Unknown	Meers Fault	~7 M	Unknown	Unknown	Meers Fault § Holocene activity	
October 22, 1882	22:14:24	Fort Gibson, Muskogee County	5.7 M_{fa}	34.45°N 96.63°W (approx.)	Unknown	—N/a	
April 9, 1952	16:29:28	El Reno, Canadian County	5.5 M_{s}, mb	35.4°N 97.8°W	10	—N/a	
February 15, 1974	13:33:49	Huntoon, Ochiltree County, TX	4.5 mb	36.500°N 100.693°W	24.0	—N/a	
September 6, 1997	23:38:00	Lula, Pontotoc County	4.5 mb_{Lg}	34.660°N 96.435°W	5.0	—N/a	
November 5, 2011	07:12:45	Sparks, Lincoln County	4.8 M_{wr}	35.550°N 96.764°W	3.1	—N/a	
November 6, 2011	03:53:10	Prague, Lincoln County	5.7 M_{ww}	35.532°N 96.765°W	5.2	2011 Oklahoma earthquake	
November 8, 2011	02:46:57	Sparks, Lincoln County	4.8 M_{wr}	35.531°N 96.788°W	5.0	—N/a	
December 7, 2013	18:10:24	Edmond, Oklahoma County	4.5 M_{wr}	35.607°N 97.386°W	8.4	—N/a	
July 27, 2015	18:12:15	Crescent, Logan County	4.5 M_{wr}	35.989°N 97.572°W	5.0	—N/a	
November 19, 2015	07:42:12	Cherokee, Alfalfa County	4.7 M_{wr}	36.660°N 98.459°W	5.9	—N/a	
November 30, 2015	09:49:12	Cherokee, Alfalfa County	4.7 M_{wr}	36.751°N 98.056°W	5.6	—N/a	
January 7, 2016	04:27:57	Fairview, Major County	4.7 M_{ww}	36.496°N 98.725°W	4.1	—N/a	
February 13, 2016	17:07:06	Fairview, Major County	5.1 M_{ww}	36.490°N 98.709°W	8.3	—N/a	
September 3, 2016	12:02:44	Pawnee, Pawnee County	5.8 M_{ww}	36.425°N 96.929°W	5.6	2016 Oklahoma earthquake	
November 2, 2016	04:26:54	Pawnee, Pawnee County	4.5 M_{wr}	36.308°N 96.647°W	2.6	—N/a	
November 7, 2016	01:44:24	Cushing, Payne County	5.0 M_{ww}	35.984°N 96.798°W	5.0	—N/a	
April 7, 2018	12:16:01	Perry, Noble County	4.6 M_{ww}	36.290°N 97.517°W	5.8	—N/a	
April 9, 2018	10:22:20	Perry, Noble County	4.6 M_{ww}	36.219°N 97.574°W	4.9	—N/a	
January 31, 2022	17:10:21	Medford, Grant County	4.5 M_{ww}	36.851°N 97.794°W	7.9	—N/a	
February 3, 2024	05:24:28	Prague, Lincoln County	5.1 M_{ww}	35.534°N 96.764°W	3.0	—N/a	

== See also ==
- 2011 Oklahoma earthquake
- 2016 Oklahoma earthquake
- Oklahoma earthquake swarms (2009–present)
- Geology of Oklahoma
