= Oklahoma earthquake swarms (2009–present) =

Series of earthquakes in central Oklahoma, southern Kansas, and northern Texas

Oklahoma area earthquake swarms
- Seismicity map of Oklahoma and vicinity
- Time: 2009–present
- Max. magnitude: 5.8 (M_{w}) (September 3, 2016 earthquake near Pawnee); 5.7 (M_{w}) (November 5, 2011 Oklahoma earthquake near Sparks/Prague area); 5.1 (M_{w}) (February 13, 2016 Oklahoma earthquake near Fairview area); 5.0 (M_{w}) (November 6, 2016 Oklahoma earthquake near Cushing)
- Type: Intraplate earthquakes
- Areas affected: Central and North-Central Oklahoma; South-Central Kansas; Dallas–Fort Worth metroplex
- Total damage: Unknown
- Casualties: Minor injuries associated with November 5, 2011 Oklahoma earthquake, 1 injured in September 3, 2016 Oklahoma earthquake
- Mean depth: 5.43 km (3.37 mi) in 2014 (Note: This figure is for Oklahoma only.)
- Total events: ≥2,890 in OK since January 1, 2009 (USGS) (Note: Only earthquakes of magnitude 3.0 or greater are included in this total.) ≥207 in KS since January 1, 2013 (USGS) 33 in N TX since January 1, 2009 (USGS) (Note: Seismic activity has largely subsided in North Texas.)

The Oklahoma earthquake swarms are an ongoing series of human activity-induced earthquakes affecting central Oklahoma southern Kansas, northern Texas since 2009. Beginning in 2009, the frequency of earthquakes in the U.S. state of Oklahoma rapidly increased from an average of fewer than two 3.0+ magnitude earthquakes per year since 1978 to hundreds each year in the 2014–17 period. Thousands of earthquakes have occurred in Oklahoma and surrounding areas in southern Kansas and North Texas since 2009. Scientific studies attribute the rise in earthquakes to the disposal of wastewater produced during oil extraction that has been injected more deeply into the ground. Two most notable cases include water injection, geothermal-induced earthquakes in areas previously without any seismic activity - in Pohang, South Korea and St. Gallen, Switzerland.

Two of the most significant earthquakes in these swarms were the November 5, 2011 Prague earthquake east of the Oklahoma City area and the September 3, 2016 earthquake near Pawnee, north of Prague. The 2011 Prague earthquake, at reported magnitude 5.6, was at the time the strongest recorded earthquake in the history of Oklahoma. The 2016 earthquake was initially reported to be an identical 5.6 magnitude, but this was later upgraded to 5.8, making it the strongest earthquake on record. Simultaneously, the USGS upgraded the magnitude of the Prague earthquake to 5.7. Numerous seismologists had advised local residents of an even greater risk of earthquakes in 2014, by which time the number of earthquakes had increased to a dangerously high level. In response to the major increase in earthquakes in the Central United States, the United States Geological Survey (USGS) began developing a new seismic hazard model to account for risk associated with induced seismicity. By June 26, 2014, no fewer than six individual earthquake sequences in Oklahoma had been identified and named by the Oklahoma Geological Survey (OGS). Other swarms have been observed in south-central Kansas and North Texas.

In March 2013, a peer-reviewed paper published by a research team led by seismologist Katie Keranen at the University of Oklahoma in the scientific journal Geology reported that "the volume of fluid injected into the subsurface related to the production of unconventional resources continues to rise" and that there was a link between the "zone of injection and the seismicity" potentially triggering the Prague earthquake. On March 28, 2016 the USGS released the USGS National Seismic Hazard Map which concluded that the primary cause of the earthquake in Oklahoma in 2011 was pressure on fault lines from cumulative effects of injecting oil drilling wastewater under high pressure into the underground. Although the 2011 earthquake was the largest on record until that time, the USGS reported that the central and eastern U.S. (CEUS) had undergone the most dramatic increase in seismic activity in the United States since 2009 with an average of 318 earthquakes of magnitude 3.0 a year up from 24 a year from 1973 to 2008. In 2015 there were 1,010 earthquakes in the CEUS region. By mid-March 2016, there were already 226 earthquakes of magnitude 3.0 and larger in the CEUS.

== Background ==
The first earthquake known to have occurred within the boundaries of Oklahoma since the state was established occurred in September 1918 when a series of shocks was felt in El Reno, Oklahoma, the strongest of which was an estimated intensity V on September 10. On September 27, 1929, another tremor of intensity VI was centered in the same area and was felt in central and western Oklahoma; minor damage occurred in nearby areas and one chimney fell. The total affected area was approximately 20,000 km^{2} (7,700 sq mi).

A magnitude 5.5 earthquake had occurred near El Reno on April 9, 1952 at 10:29 a.m. CST (16:29 UTC). At the time, it was the strongest earthquake ever recorded in Oklahoma. Most of Oklahoma was affected, as were parts of Arkansas, Iowa, Kansas, Missouri, Nebraska, and Texas. Damage was not extensive, but local residents were alarmed, and several thousands of dollars in damage occurred. Chimneys were toppled, walls were cracked, windows were broken, and bricks were loosened from buildings. In Oklahoma City, a crack measuring 15 meters (49 ft) was found in the State Capitol following the earthquake. The earthquake, which occurred along the Nemaha Fault, had a maximum intensity of VII near the epicenter.

Scattered earthquakes occurred in Oklahoma between 1952 and 1969 with intensities as high as VII. Between 1978 and 2008, the average long-term rate of earthquakes was approximately two earthquakes of magnitude 3.0 or greater per year. However, in 2009, this number jumped to 20 with the beginning of several swarms of earthquakes in Oklahoma. Research suggests that most of the significant earthquakes in Oklahoma since the 1930s may have been induced by oil production activities, primarily waste-water disposal.

== Earthquakes ==
=== 2009–2010 ===
The average number of earthquakes between 1978 and 1999 was 1.6 earthquakes of magnitude 3.0 or higher per year. This average dropped even lower between 2000 and 2008, with no year ever having more than three earthquakes of greater than or equal to magnitude 3.0 during the period. However, totals well above the 1978–2008 averages were recorded in 2009, with 20 earthquakes with magnitudes of at least 3.0 recorded. By the end of the year, Oklahoma County had seen its most active earthquake year since 1889, as recorded by the Oklahoma Geological Survey.

Earthquakes continued in 2010, with numerous earthquakes occurring in Central Oklahoma; among these is an earthquake which took place on October 13 in the vicinity of Norman. With a USGS-assigned magnitude of 4.4 M_{w}, it resulted in two fall-related injuries, and the USGS received felt reports from seven states. The year ended with an annual statewide total of 43 earthquakes of magnitude 3.0 or greater.

=== 2011–2012 ===
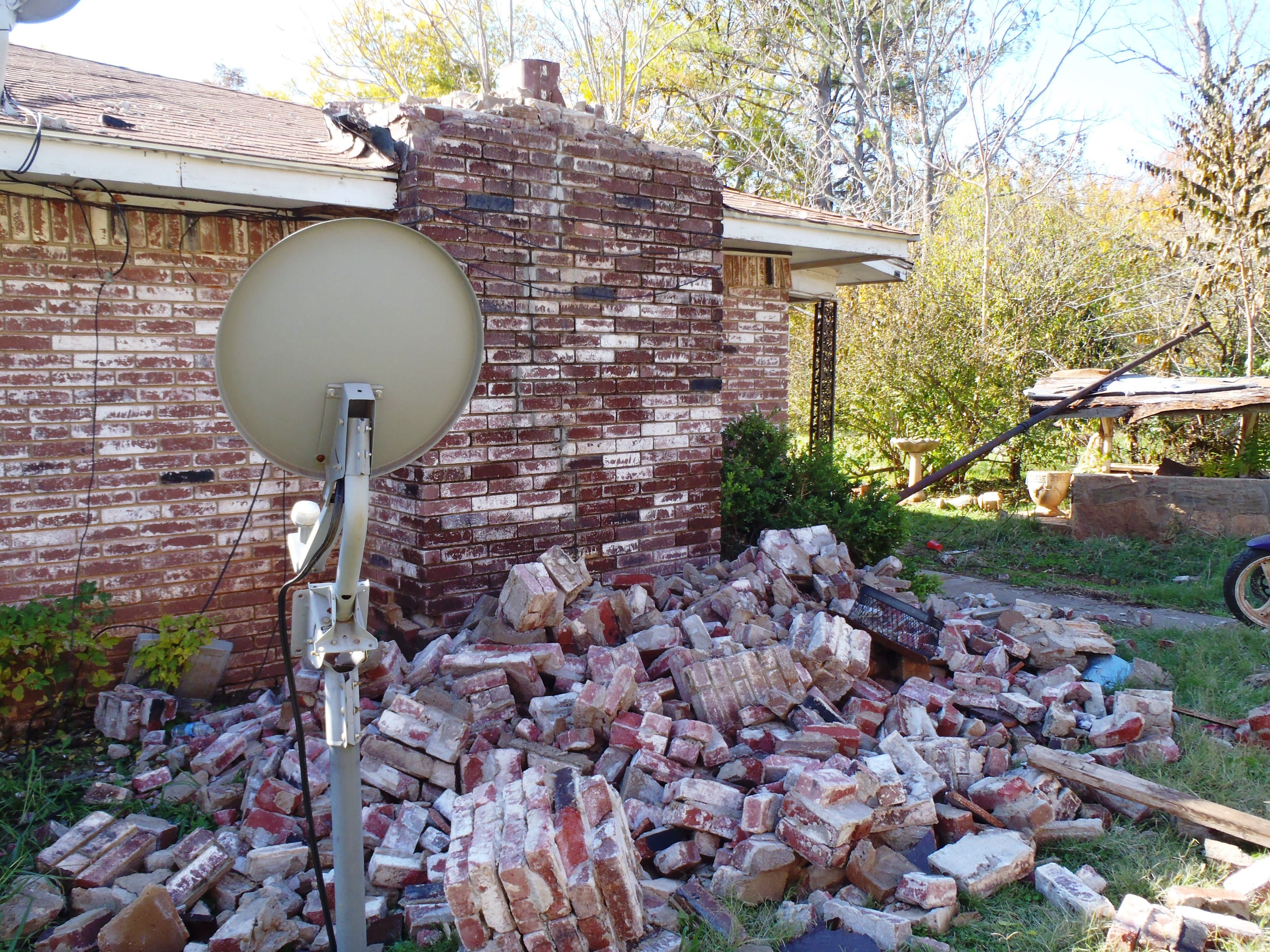
Damage from the magnitude 5.6 earthquake on November 5, 2011, the largest earthquake on record in the state at the time

A rise in seismicity in Oklahoma was observed in 2011. Early on the morning of November 5, 2011, an earthquake with a magnitude of 4.8 struck an area east of Oklahoma City roughly centered between Sparks and Prague. At the time, it was the strongest earthquake associated with the rise in Oklahoma's seismicity. Less than a day later at 10:53 p.m., a 5.6 M_{w} earthquake occurred near the location of the preceding 4.8 magnitude earthquake, becoming the strongest earthquake observed with any of the swarms as well as the strongest earthquake in the history of Oklahoma. This also resulted in the reclassification of the magnitude 4.8 earthquake as a foreshock and the 5.6 magnitude earthquake as the mainshock. The earthquake received over 66,000 "Did You Feel It?" responses nationwide sent to the United States Geological Survey. It was believed that the earthquake had occurred along the Wilzetta Fault, also known as the Seminole Uplift. Following this earthquake, several portable seismograph stations were established by the USGS, OGS, and University of Oklahoma School of Geology and Geophysics to aid with detection of future earthquakes in the area. The 5.6 M_{w} mainshock was followed by a magnitude 4.8 aftershock slightly under two days later, and numerous other aftershocks occurred in the following months. Through the end of 2011, 64 earthquakes were recorded, nearly double the number recorded for 2010.

2012 saw a decrease in seismic activity in Oklahoma when compared to 2011, with a recorded annual total of 35 earthquakes magnitude 3.0 or greater, 29 fewer than recorded in the previous year.

=== 2013–2014 ===
On December 7, 2013, an earthquake occurred within the city limits of Oklahoma City in an area south of Lake Arcadia with a magnitude of 4.5 M_{w}. This was the strongest earthquake to occur in Oklahoma since the November 5, 2011 earthquake near the Prague–Sparks area east of Oklahoma City. For 2013, an estimated 109 earthquakes occurred according to the Oklahoma Geological Survey, a number substantially higher than in any previous year going back to 1978.

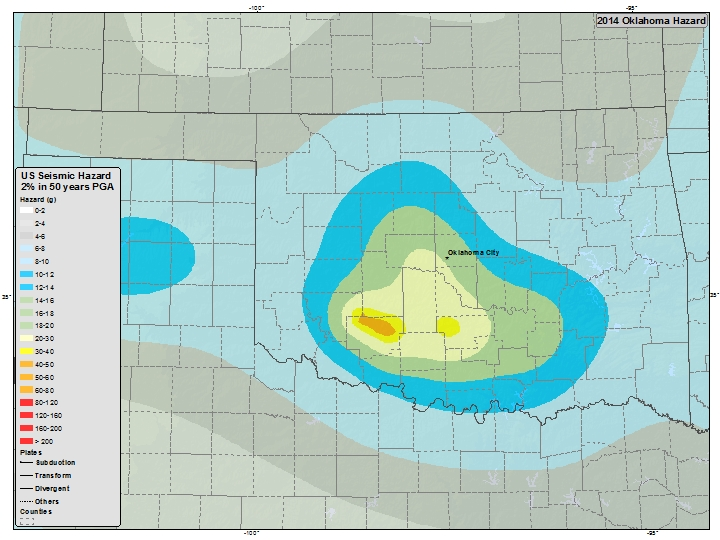
Seismic hazard map for Oklahoma for 2014 – this hazard map does not account for the recent earthquakes and potentially induced seismicity

The 2014 total of 3.0+ magnitude earthquakes by May 2 was higher than the entire yearly total for 2013, at over 140 earthquakes. The number of earthquakes in Oklahoma increased by about 50% from October 2013 to May 2, 2014, prompting the United States Geological Survey to issue an uncommon "Earthquake Advisory" for Central Oklahoma warning of the elevated possibility of damaging, 5.5+ magnitude earthquakes. This was the first advisory in the United States ever issued east of the Rocky Mountains and remains effective.

On July 17, 2014, the United States Geological Survey released an updated map identifying seismic hazard for the continental United States. However, the earthquakes occurring in much of Oklahoma were not included in the creation of the map, for it is believed by the USGS that some degree of the earthquakes may have been induced by wastewater injection, and the map is meant to represent natural seismicity alone due to the unpredictable nature of earthquakes created by human industrial activities. Austin Holland of the OGS voiced concerns about the removal of the earthquakes in the map's creation, and he said "By removing them, we are underestimating the potential of serious seismic hazard in Oklahoma." William Ellsworth of the USGS responded by mentioning that the USGS was working on a new hazard model; "Everyone here thinks quakes, regardless of origin, need to be accounted for in our hazard model," he said.

The swarms, while initially located primarily further south, traveled northward from Central Oklahoma into Logan County in early 2014. Additional earthquake swarms initiated in north-central Oklahoma, including areas near Medford, Oklahoma. The latter swarms crossed into southern Kansas in 2013. Many earthquakes have also occurred in the southernmost part of Kansas since they began, with the most significant being a magnitude 4.9 earthquake on November 12, 2014, the strongest earthquake produced by the swarms since a magnitude 4.5 earthquake struck in Northeast Oklahoma City on December 7, 2013 almost a year earlier.

=== 2015–2016 ===
Graph of 3.0+ magnitude earthquakes on the moment magnitude scale known to have occurred annually in Oklahoma through December 3, 2018 – a drastic increase can be seen starting in about 2009. Data is preliminary. Click to enlarge.

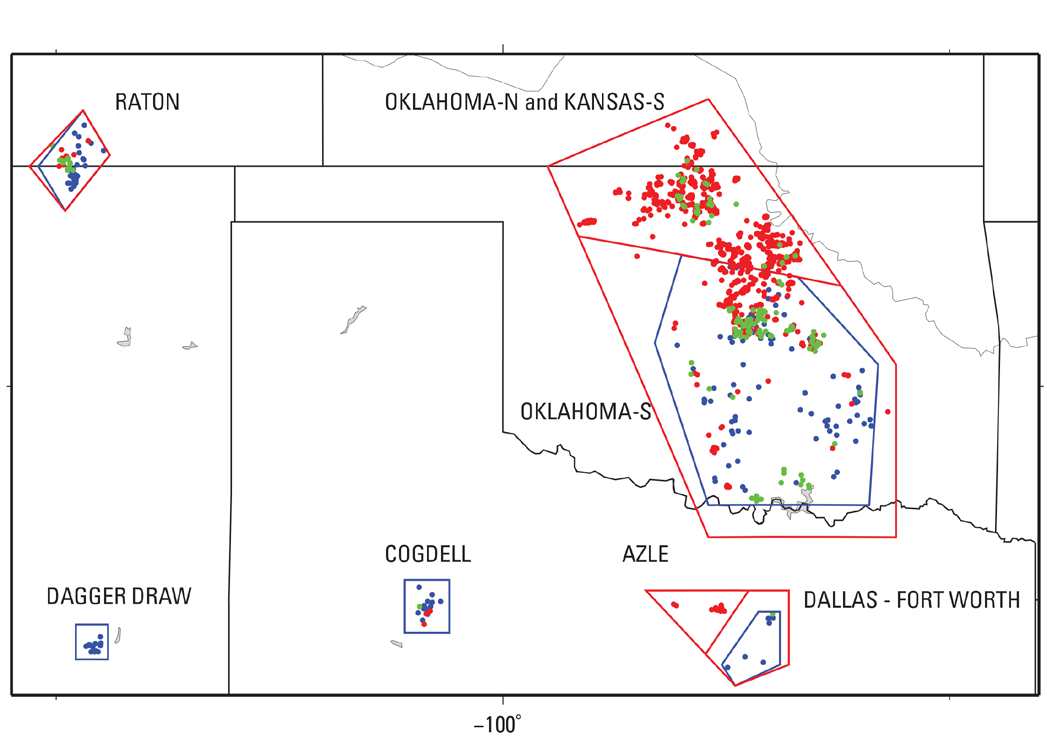
Zones of suspected induced seismicity in the Oklahoma area

By the end of 2014, 567 earthquakes of at least magnitude 3.0 were recorded in Oklahoma, more than the number of 3.0+ magnitude earthquakes from the previous 30 years combined. In 2014, there were over twice as many earthquakes recorded in Oklahoma as in California, making Oklahoma the most seismically active state in the contiguous United States by a substantial margin. A review by EnergyWire examined earthquakes of greater than or equal to magnitude 3.0, and found that seismic activity in Oklahoma had been spreading northward into Kansas, which experienced a major jump in earthquakes from 2013 to 2014. As in southern Kansas, earthquakes increased in frequency in North Texas, with over 130 earthquakes occurring there from 2009 to early 2015.

For the first time, the United States Geological Survey decided it would include earthquakes believed to have connections to industrial activities in its National Seismic Hazard Map which sets standards for construction and insurance rates. According to USGS National Seismic Hazard Project head Mark Petersen, an updated version of the map would become available before the end of 2015. This marks a deviation from the past, with the USGS updating the National Seismic Hazard Map annually instead of every six years.

Animation of all M3+ earthquakes in Oklahoma from June 9, 2008 to February 25, 2017

The United States Geological Survey updated its National Seismic Hazard Map in 2014; however, potentially induced earthquakes were intentionally not considered in this analysis as geologists were uncertain how to incorporate non-tectonic earthquakes. Several months later in April 2015, a comprehensive assessment was released analyzing the link between the increase in seismic activity in the Central United States and oil and gas operations. Seventeen induced seismicity zones for earthquakes over the past 50 years were delineated in this assessment, including one region encompassing northern Oklahoma and parts of southern Kansas, a second region covering central Oklahoma down to the Oklahoma–Texas border, and a third region encompassing the Dallas–Fort Worth area of Texas.

On April 21, 2015, the Oklahoma Geological Survey abandoned its skepticism of the possible link between earthquakes and industrial activities and said in an official statement that it "considers it very likely that the majority of recent earthquakes, particularly those in central and north-central Oklahoma, are triggered by the injection of produced water in disposal wells." In 2013, the seismicity rate was "70 times greater than the background seismicity rate observed in Oklahoma prior to 2008", potentially although unlikely explainable by natural variations in seismicity, but the seismicity rate by the time of the statement was "about 600 times greater than the background seismicity rate" and was "very unlikely the result of a natural process."

Late on August 16, the number of earthquakes in Oklahoma with moment magnitudes of ≥3.0 for the year of 2015 surpassed the yearly total for 2014 of 585 such earthquakes with over six times as many M_{W} 3.0+ earthquakes as California. Through August 19, Oklahoma average 2.5 M_{W} 3.0+ earthquakes a day in 2015; if earthquakes were to continue to occur at this rate through the remainder of 2015, Oklahoma would total over 912 such earthquakes, an increase of over 55% as compared to 2014.

On December 29, a magnitude 4.3 earthquake struck in northeastern Oklahoma County near the town of Edmond. The quake caused structural damage to at least one home and caused power outages to over four thousand residents. This was followed by a 4.2 magnitude earthquake on the morning of January 1, 2016, again in northeastern Oklahoma County in a nearby area. Then on January 6, two earthquakes – one of magnitude 4.4 and one of magnitude 4.8 – struck near Fairview in northwest Oklahoma within just 30 seconds of each other. On February 13, slightly over five weeks later, an earthquake with an estimated magnitude of 5.1 struck 28 kilometers (17 miles) northwest of Fairview. It was the third-strongest earthquake ever recorded in Oklahoma at the time it occurred.

Early on the morning of September 3, a 5.8-magnitude quake struck 9.3 miles (15 km) north of Pawnee, Oklahoma, breaking the record set by the 2011 earthquake near Prague, Oklahoma for the strongest quake in the state. Though the USGS originally stated that, like the Prague quake, its magnitude was 5.6, the USGS later upgraded the magnitude of the Pawnee quake to 5.8 while simultaneously retrospectively upgrading the Prague quake to 5.7. Just as with its predecessor in 2011, this quake also was reported to have been felt by people in other states; the USGS recorded reports of perceptible shaking as far north as Fargo, North Dakota and as far south as San Antonio, Texas. Multiple residential and commercial structures were damaged, and one person was injured in Pawnee when he was struck by falling bricks.

A large earthquake of magnitude 5.0 occurred on the evening of November 6, with an epicenter located one mile (2 km) west of Cushing in Payne County. It was the fifth-largest earthquake recorded in state history. Following the quake, images of damage to buildings in Cushing began to surface on Twitter and local news reported that the Cushing Fire Department had been inundated with calls of damage, but no injuries had been reported. The Cimarron Tower assisted-living apartment building incurred damage, with part of the building collapsing, and all of its elderly residents were evacuated. Additional damage was inflicted on the First Presbyterian Church. Cushing Public Schools canceled Monday classes to allow for damage to be evaluated. The largest oil storage hub in the United States, located in Cushing, did not report any damage. According to the city manager of Cushing, 40 to 50 structures in the city received damage.

=== 2017–2018 ===
In March 2017, an updated seismic hazard forecast, which like the 2016 version included the risk from induced earthquakes, was released by the United States Geological Survey. The new forecast incorporated earthquakes that occurred in 2016. In 2017 earthquake activity decreased dramatically compared to the previous years, with 294 magnitude 3.0 or greater earthquakes recorded in the state by mid-December. This was less than half the number of similar magnitude quakes recorded in 2016. A correlation between numerous waste water injection sites being closed or forced to reduce the volume of injection was reported by USGS geologists to have a direct link to the reduction in earthquakes.

On March 4, two magnitude 4.2 earthquakes struck near Enid, Oklahoma. One house in Breckenridge was badly damaged and others suffered structural damages, as well as cracks in walls or broken windows.

== Cause ==
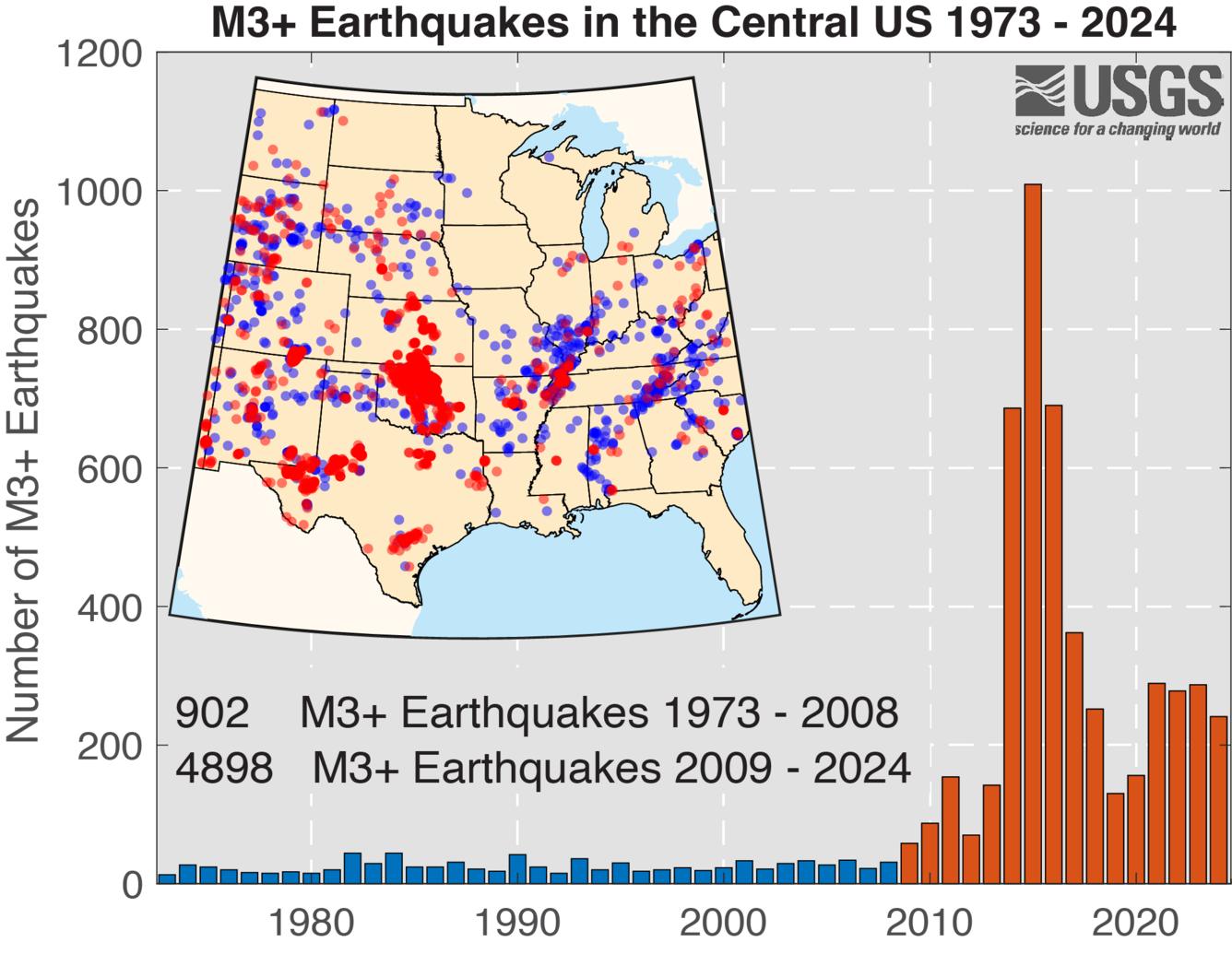
Cumulative number of earthquakes in the central and eastern U.S. Most of the increase (shown in red) is due to induced seismicity in Oklahoma and nearby Kansas.

Researchers have correlated the increase in earthquakes in central and north-central Oklahoma to injection disposal of produced water from two actively drilled stratigraphic intervals: the Mississippi Lime play, in north-central Oklahoma and extending into Kansas, which uses hydraulic fracturing; and the Hunton dewatering play, in central Oklahoma, which does not use hydraulic fracturing. Both Mississippi Lime and Hunton plays produce large volumes of produced water; frac flowback makes up less than 5 percent of the injected wastewater. More than 70 percent of the produced water from both plays is disposed through permitted Class II injection wells into the Arbuckle Group where it rests on Precambrian basement. The increase in pore pressure can release pre-existing stresses along faults in the basement rock.

Between 2011 and 2014, the percentage of earthquakes spatiotemporally associated with injection wells has increased sharply by 87%. A study of historic earthquakes has concluded that "much of the earthquake activity in the 1950s and 1980–1990s was induced" by injection of wastewater in deep disposal wells and the cluster of activity since 2009 is not consistent with the natural rate of fluctuations seen in the past.

== Governmental response ==
In September 2014, in response to the swarms of earthquakes, Oklahoma Governor Mary Fallin announced the creation of a "Coordinating Council on Seismic Activity" to help promote further understanding of the increase in seismicity. Fallin added, "We believe that by linking scientists and energy experts, we can develop sound regulatory practices and policies in our state while also alleviating any questions our citizens might have." The council, led by Michael Teague, is expected to include input from multiple areas, including "the Oklahoma Geologic Survey, the Oklahoma Corporation Commission, the Oklahoma Energy Resources Board, the University of Oklahoma, Oklahoma State University, the Oklahoma Independent Petroleum Association, the Oklahoma Oil and Gas Association, and various state legislators". However, some criticized the council, saying it included too many representatives from the oil and gas industry; additional critics pointed out the fact that Michael Teague was the Oklahoma Secretary of Energy. Teague replied by saying that he was also concerned with environment, and he followed by adding, "We are talking to environmental groups and industry folks and academic folks and state agencies and how do you bring them all together?"

After EnergyWire obtained Oklahoma Geological Survey email correspondence through an Oklahoma Open Records Act request in 2015, it was found that after the OGS acknowledged a link between oil and gas operations and the ongoing earthquakes in the latter part of 2013, state seismologist Austin Holland was called into a meeting with University of Oklahoma President David L. Boren and oil executives, one of whom was Harold Hamm, CEO of Oklahoma City-based Continental Resources. Holland had previously spoken with a senior official of the United States Geological Survey discussing the connection between a swarm of earthquakes near and east of Oklahoma City. Holland wrote to USGS science advisor Bill Leith in 2013 "Since early 2010 we have recognized the potential for the Jones earthquake swarm to be due to the Hunton dewatering," but he followed by saying "But until we can demonstrate that scientifically or not we were not going to discuss that publicly." In October 2013, a joint statement between the OGS and the USGS announced that "activities such as wastewater disposal" may be a "contributing factor to the increase in earthquakes." Holland was requested a week later to come to Oklahoma Corporation Commission headquarters by then-Commissioner Patrice Douglas for a meeting. Also sent for was then-president of exploration at Continental Resources, Jack Stark. As Holland recounted in a later email, Stark and Douglas were "concerned" by the joint statement.

In April 2015, the OGS changed its position and acknowledged that the earthquakes were "very unlikely the result of a natural process," and that the tremendous increase in the frequency of earthquake occurrence is likely due to the injection of produced water in disposal wells. The State of Oklahoma shortly after launched a website providing information about earthquakes in the state, including an interactive map where both earthquakes and disposal wells can be plotted. Before that time, the oil industry had successfully pressured the OGS to release a statement saying "The interpretation that best fits current data is that the Prague earthquake sequence was the result of natural causes" which the OGS later recanted.

In the immediate aftermath of the September 3, 2016 earthquake near Pawnee, the Oklahoma Corporation Commission issued an emergency order shutting down thirty-seven waste water disposal wells in the immediate vicinity of the epicenter. Governor Mary Fallin also declared a state of emergency for Pawnee County, where the worst of the damage from the quake was located. On September 16, less than two weeks after the earthquake, the Oklahoma Geological Survey announced that it had hired a new state seismologist, Jacob Walter.

=== "Traffic light" system ===
The Oklahoma Geological Survey has developed a "traffic light" system, which assigns "yellow light" status to some disposal wells, imposing limits on injection rates and pressures, and "red light" status to some injection wells, requiring them to shut down. Injection wells are regulated by the Oklahoma Corporation Commission, which regulates oil and gas in the state. The Corporation Commission has also required more than 50 disposal wells drilled down to the basement to be plugged back.

Following earthquake activity in Alfalfa County, Oklahoma near the Kansas–Oklahoma border in late-January 2015, the Oklahoma Corporation Commission ordered SandRidge Energy to shut down an injection well it was operating. This was the second wastewater injection well directed to "shut in" or halt operations by the agency since a new monitoring system was established in 2013. According to Matt Skinner, a spokesman from the commission, the directive was issued on February 3 in response to a magnitude 4.1 earthquake recorded in the area four days earlier. According to Skinner, "They were operating under a 'yellow light' permit with language that said shut in if there's any seismic activity."

== Damage ==
As a result of the magnitude 5.6 earthquake on November 5, 2011, an estimated one million dollars in damage occurred in and around the Prague area. In April 2014, the United States Geological Survey released an analysis indicating that "the likelihood of future, damaging earthquakes [in central and north-central Oklahoma] has increased as a result of the increased number of small and moderate shocks."

In light of the greatly increased earthquake activity, about 15% of Oklahomans had purchased earthquake insurance by early 2015 according to Oklahoma Insurance Commissioner John D. Doak.

On June 30, 2015, the Oklahoma Supreme Court ruled that homeowners who had suffered injuries or property damage as a result of frequent earthquakes believed to be caused by industrial activities could legally sue for damages in trial courts. This ruling was issued in spite of efforts by the industry to prevent such lawsuits from being accepted. The case was originally brought before a state court by Gary and Sandra Ladra, whose home in Prague was damaged; she had also sustained physical injuries during the quake. It named the Spess Oil Company and New Dominion, LLC, two oil and gas companies, as named defendants in the case. The case was initially dismissed by a state court under the premise that such cases must go before the Oklahoma Corporation Commission as required by state law. After the Ladra's lawyer appealed to the state supreme court, the 7-to-0 ruling on June 30, 2015, was made. In July 2017, Spess came to a confidential settlement with the Ladras in the case.

Those who bought earthquake insurance were unlikely to benefit. Of the 250,000 plus earthquake policies sold between 2010 and 2016, only 1,136 claims were filed by homeowners, and only 202 received any compensation, under 18% of claimants. Insurers took in $135 million in premiums, but paid out only $4.5 million, $1.2 million of which was on a single home in an upscale Oklahoma City neighborhood.

== Annual earthquake totals ==
Annual totals of earthquakes in Oklahoma with a moment magnitude of at least 3.0. Source: USGS-ANSS ComCat. View chart definition.

== See also ==
- Guy–Greenbrier earthquake swarm
- Intraplate earthquake
- List of earthquakes in Oklahoma
- Environmental impact of hydraulic fracturing
- Externality
