= Geology of Oklahoma =

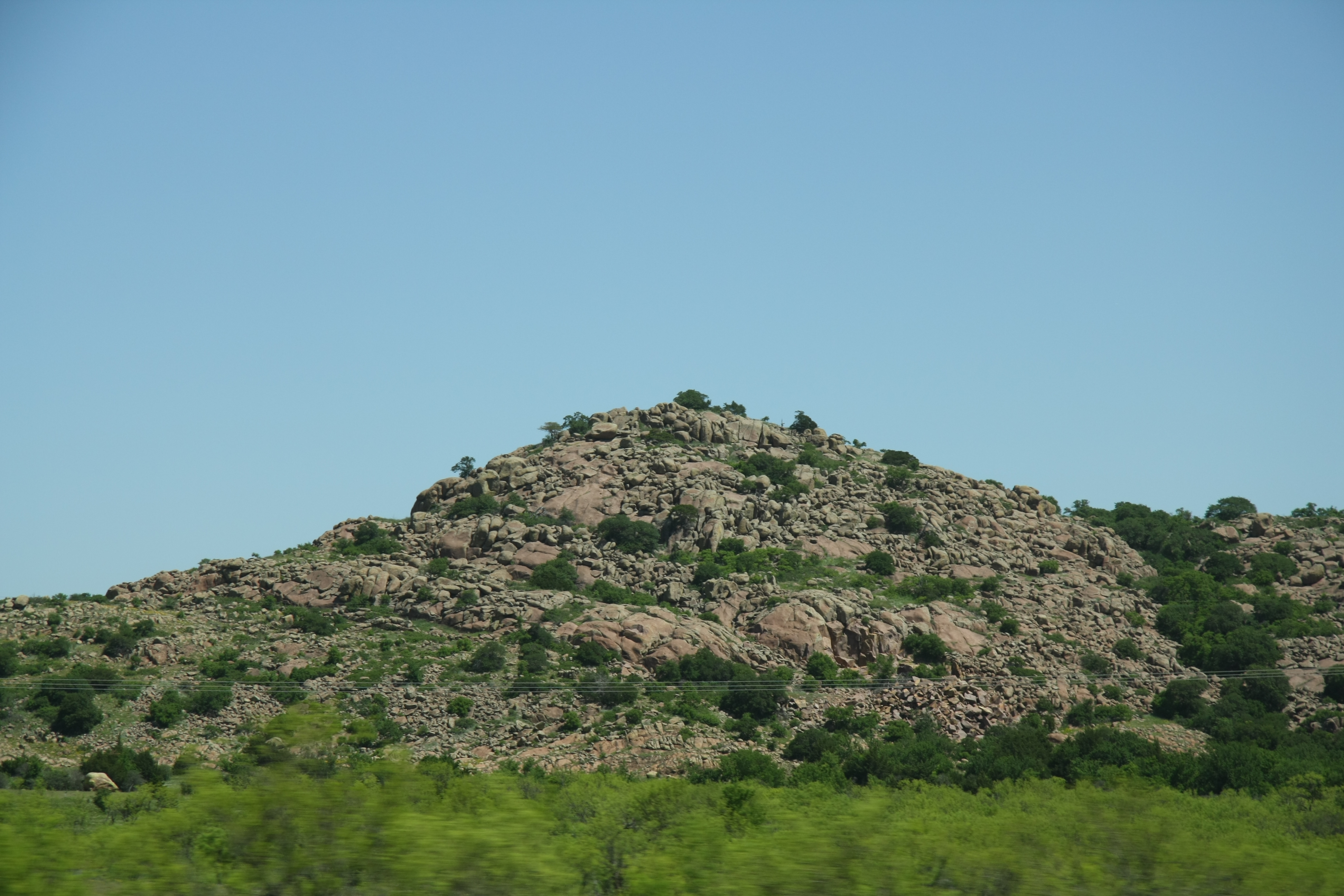
Geographic Landscape of Oklahoma; Wichita Mountains

The geology of Oklahoma is characterized by Carboniferous rocks in the east, Permian rocks in the center and towards the west, and a cover of Tertiary deposits in the panhandle to the west. The panhandle of Oklahoma is also noted for its Jurassic rocks as well. Cretaceous sediments are found in the south east. There are also some areas with older outcrops dating back to Cambrian, and even one area of Precambrian igneous rocks.

== See also ==
- 2011 Oklahoma earthquake
- 2016 Oklahoma earthquake
- Oklahoma earthquake swarms (2009–present)
- Oklahoma Geological Survey

== Sources ==
- Oklahoma Geological Survey

U.S. Geological Survey

- Oklahoma - Digital Geologic Map Database https://pubs.usgs.gov/of/2003/ofr-03-247/OK_map.pdf (19 MB).
