= Injection well =

Device that places fluid deep underground

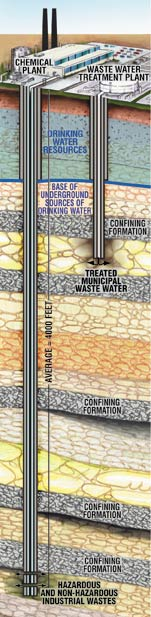
Deep injection well for disposal of hazardous, industrial and municipal wastewater; a "Class I" well under USEPA regulations.

An injection well is a device that places fluid deep underground into porous rock formations, such as sandstone or limestone, or into or below the shallow soil layer. The fluid may be water, wastewater, brine (salt water), or water mixed with industrial chemical waste.

== Definition ==
The U.S. Environmental Protection Agency (EPA) defines an injection well as "a bored, drilled, or driven shaft, or a dug hole that is deeper than it is wide, or an improved sinkhole, or a subsurface fluid distribution system". Well construction depends on the injection fluid injected and depth of the injection zone. Deep wells that are designed to inject hazardous wastes or carbon dioxide deep below the Earth's surface have multiple layers of protective casing and cement, whereas shallow wells injecting non-hazardous fluids into or above drinking water sources are more simply constructed.

== Applications ==
Injection wells are used for many purposes.

=== Waste disposal ===
Treated wastewater can be injected into the ground between impermeable layers of rocks to avoid polluting surface waters. Injection wells are usually constructed of solid walled pipe to a deep elevation in order to prevent injectate from mixing with the surrounding environment. Injection wells utilize the earth as a filter to treat the wastewater before it reaches the aquifer. This method of wastewater disposal also serves to spread the injectate over a wide area, further decreasing environmental impacts.

In the United States, there are about 800 deep injection waste disposal wells used by industries such as chemical manufacturers, petroleum refineries, food producers and municipal wastewater plants. Most produced water generated by oil and gas extraction wells in the US is also disposed in deep injection wells.

Critics of wastewater injection wells cite concerns about potential groundwater contamination. It is argued that the impacts of some injected wastes in groundwater is not fully understood, and that the science and regulatory agencies have not kept up with the rapid expansion of disposal practices in US, where there are over 680,000 wells as of 2012.

Alternatives to injection wells include direct discharge of treated wastewater to receiving waters, conditioning of oil drilling and fracking produced water for reuse, utilization of treated water for irrigation or livestock watering, or processing of water at industrial wastewater treatment plants. Direct discharge does not disperse the water over a wide area; the environmental impact is focused on a particular segment of a river and its downstream reaches or on a coastal water body. Extensive irrigation is not typical in areas where the produced water tends to be salty, and this practice is often prohibitively expensive and requires ongoing maintenance and large electricity usage.

Since the early 1990s, Maui County, Hawaii has been engaged in a struggle over the 3 to 5 million gallons per day of wastewater that it injects below the Lahaina Wastewater Reclamation Facility, over the claim that the water was emerging in seeps that were causing algae blooms and other environmental damage. After some twenty years, it was sued by environmental groups after multiple studies showed that more than half the injectate was appearing in nearby coastal waters. The judge in the suit rejected the County's arguments, potentially subjecting it to millions of dollars in federal fines. A 2001 consent decree required the county to obtain a water quality certification from the Hawaii Department of Health, which it failed to do until 2010, after the suit was filed. The case proceeded through the United States Court of Appeals for the Ninth Circuit and subsequently to the Supreme Court of the United States. In 2020 the Court ruled in County of Maui v. Hawaii Wildlife Fund that injection wells may be the "functional equivalent of a direct discharge" under the Clean Water Act, and instructed the EPA to work with the courts to establish regulations when these types of wells should require permits.

=== Oil and gas production ===
Another use of injection wells is in natural gas and petroleum production. Steam, carbon dioxide, water, and other substances can be injected into an oil-producing unit in order to maintain reservoir pressure, heat the oil or lower its viscosity, allowing it to flow to a producing well nearby.

=== Waste site remediation ===
Yet another use for injection wells is in environmental remediation, for cleanup of either soil or groundwater contamination. Injection wells can insert clean water into an aquifer, thereby changing the direction and speed of groundwater flow, perhaps towards extraction wells downgradient, which could then more speedily and efficiently remove the contaminated groundwater. Injection wells can also be used in cleanup of soil contamination, for example by use of an ozonation system. Complex hydrocarbons and other contaminants trapped in soil and otherwise inaccessible can be broken down by ozone, a highly reactive gas, often with greater cost-effectiveness than could be had by digging out the affected area. Such systems are particularly useful in built-up urban environments where digging may be impractical due to overlying buildings.

=== Aquifer recharge ===
Recently the option of refilling natural aquifers with injection or percolation has become more important, particularly in the driest region of the world, the MENA region (Middle East and North Africa).

Surface runoff can also be recharged into dry wells, or simply barren wells that have been modified to functions as cisterns. These hybrid stormwater management systems, called recharge wells, have the advantage of aquifer recharge and instantaneous supply of potable water at the same time. They can utilize existing infrastructure and require very little effort for the modification and operation. The activation can be as simple as inserting a polymer cover (foil) into the well shaft. Vertical pipes for conduction of the overflow to the bottom can enhance performance. The area around the well acts as funnel. If this area is maintained well the water will require little purification before it enters the cistern.

=== Geothermal energy ===
Injection wells are used to tap geothermal energy in hot, porous rock formations below the surface by injecting fluids into the ground, which is heated in the ground, then extracted from adjacent wells as fluid, steam, or a combination of both. The heated steam and fluid can then be utilized to generate electricity or directly for geothermal heating.

== Regulatory requirements ==
In the United States, injection well activity is regulated by EPA and state governments under the Safe Drinking Water Act (SDWA). The “State primary enforcement responsibility” section of the SDWA provides for States to submit their proposed UIC program to the EPA to request State assumption of primary enforcement responsibility. Thirty-four states have been granted UIC primacy enforcement authority for Class I, II, III, IV and V wells. For states without an approved UIC program, the EPA administrator prescribes a program to apply. EPA has issued Underground Injection Control (UIC) regulations in order to protect drinking water sources.

EPA regulations define six classes of injection wells. Class I wells are used for the injection of municipal and industrial wastes beneath underground sources of drinking water. Class II wells are used for the injection of fluids associated with oil and gas production, including waste from hydraulic fracturing. Class III wells are used for the injection of fluids used in mineral solution mining beneath underground sources of drinking water. Class IV wells, like Class I wells, were used for the injection of hazardous wastes but inject waste into or above underground sources of drinking water instead of below. EPA banned the use of Class IV wells in 1984. Class V wells are those used for all non-hazardous injections that are not covered by Classes I through IV. Examples of Class V wells include stormwater drainage wells and septic system leach fields. Finally, Class VI wells are used for the injection of carbon dioxide for sequestration, or long term storage. Since the introduction of Class VI in 2010, only two Class VI wells have been constructed as of 2022, both at the same Illinois facility; four other approved projects did not proceed to construction. As of September 2026, the EPA has approved 19 Class VI carbon-storage well permits and is reviewing approximately 142 applications.

== Injection-induced earthquakes ==
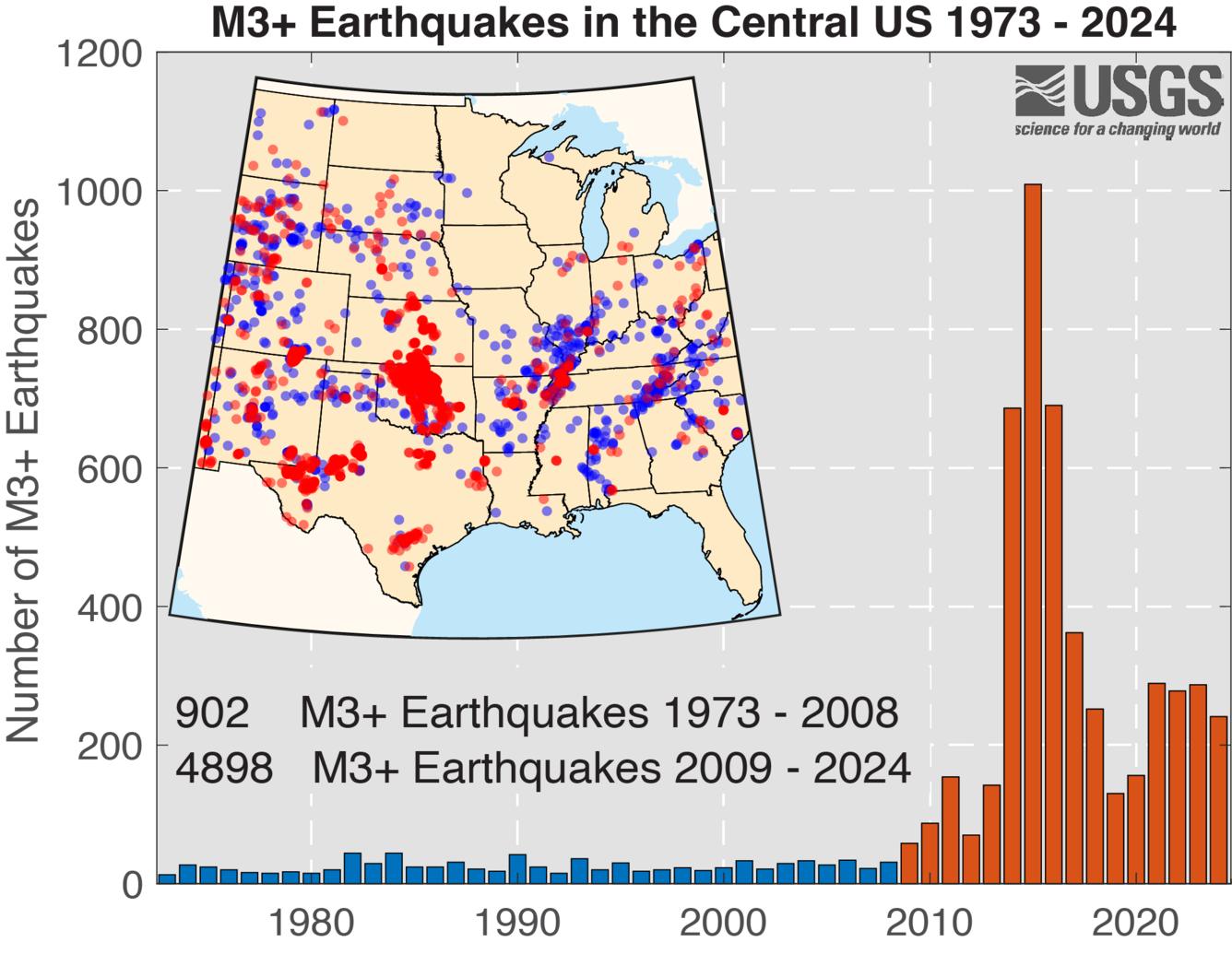
Cumulative number of earthquakes in the central U.S. The red cluster at the center of the map shows an area near Oklahoma which experienced the largest increase in activity since 2009.

A July 2013 study by US Geological Survey scientist William Ellsworth links earthquakes to wastewater injection sites. In the four years from 2010-2013 the number of earthquakes of magnitude 3.0 or greater in the central and eastern United States increased dramatically. After decades of a steady earthquake rate (average of 21 events/year), activity increased starting in 2001 and peaked at 188 earthquakes in 2011, including a record-breaking 5.7-magnitude earthquake near Prague, Oklahoma which was the strongest earthquake ever recorded in Oklahoma. USGS scientists have found that at some locations the increase in seismicity coincides with the injection of wastewater in deep disposal wells. Injection-induced earthquakes are thought to be caused by pressure changes due to excess fluid injected deep below the surface and are being dubbed “man-made” earthquakes. On September 3, 2016, a 5.8-magnitude earthquake occurred near Pawnee, Oklahoma, followed by nine aftershocks between magnitudes 2.6 and 3.6 within three and one-half hours. The earthquake broke the previous record set five years earlier. Tremors were felt as far away as Memphis, Tennessee, and Gilbert, Arizona. Mary Fallin, the Oklahoma governor, declared a local emergency and shutdown orders for local disposal wells were ordered by the Oklahoma Corporation Commission. Results of ongoing multi-year research on induced earthquakes by the United States Geological Survey (USGS) published in 2015 suggested that most of the significant earthquakes in Oklahoma, such as the 1952 magnitude 5.5 El Reno earthquake may have been induced by deep injection of waste water by the oil industry.
