= Meers, Oklahoma =

Unincorporated community in Oklahoma, US

- Unincorporated community
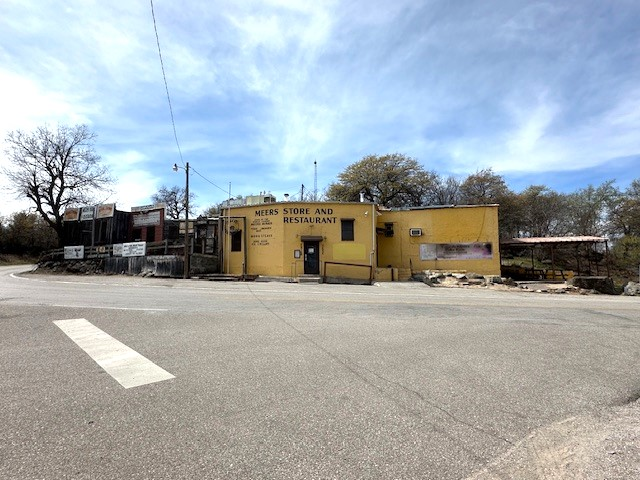
- Meers in March 2025

- Location within the state of Oklahoma Meers (the United States)
- Coordinates: 34°46′58″N 98°34′44″W
- Country: United States
- State: Oklahoma
- County: Comanche
- Elevation: 1,460 ft (450 m)
- Time zone: UTC-6 (Central (CST))
  - Summer (DST): UTC-5 (CDT)
- ZIP codes: 73558
- FIPS code: 40-47500
- GNIS feature ID: 1100624

Meers is an unincorporated community located on State Highway 115 in Comanche County, Oklahoma, United States, in the foothills of the Wichita Mountains. In 1901, Meers was founded as a gold prospecting town where it was named in honor of mine operator Andrew J. Meers from Cherokee County, Georgia.

The only remaining structure of the original town is the Meers Store & Restaurant, which Food Network named as the best hamburger joint in Oklahoma and one of the best in the United States, largely due to its signature MeersBurger.

The Meers Store also served as the area post office from March 12, 1902, until February, 1989. Currently, area residents have Lawton mailing addresses.

== Geological formation of Southwest Oklahoma ==
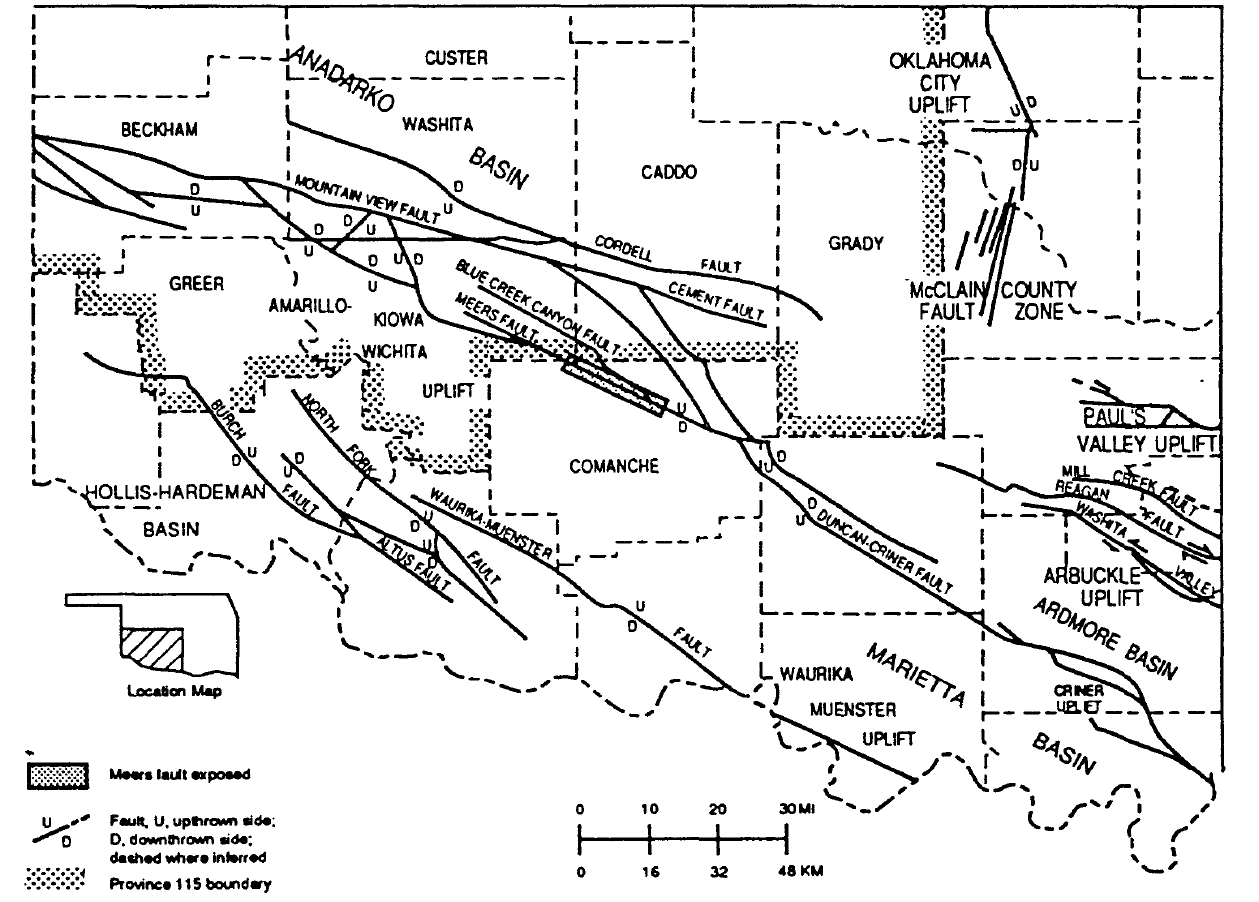
Map of Wichita Fault

Meers is defined by a geological displacement or planar fracture known as the Meers Fault. The northwestern Meers fault and the southeastern Meers fault lines are geologically situated in the central lowlands.

In 1985, in order to monitor a seismic event, the Oklahoma Geological Survey installed a seismograph in the Meers Store.

== Listing as National Register of Historic Places ==
The Meers Store was listed on the National Register of Historic Places in 1978 as Meers Mining Camp, since it was the only surviving relic of the community's gold rush days.

== Depictions of Meers, Oklahoma ==
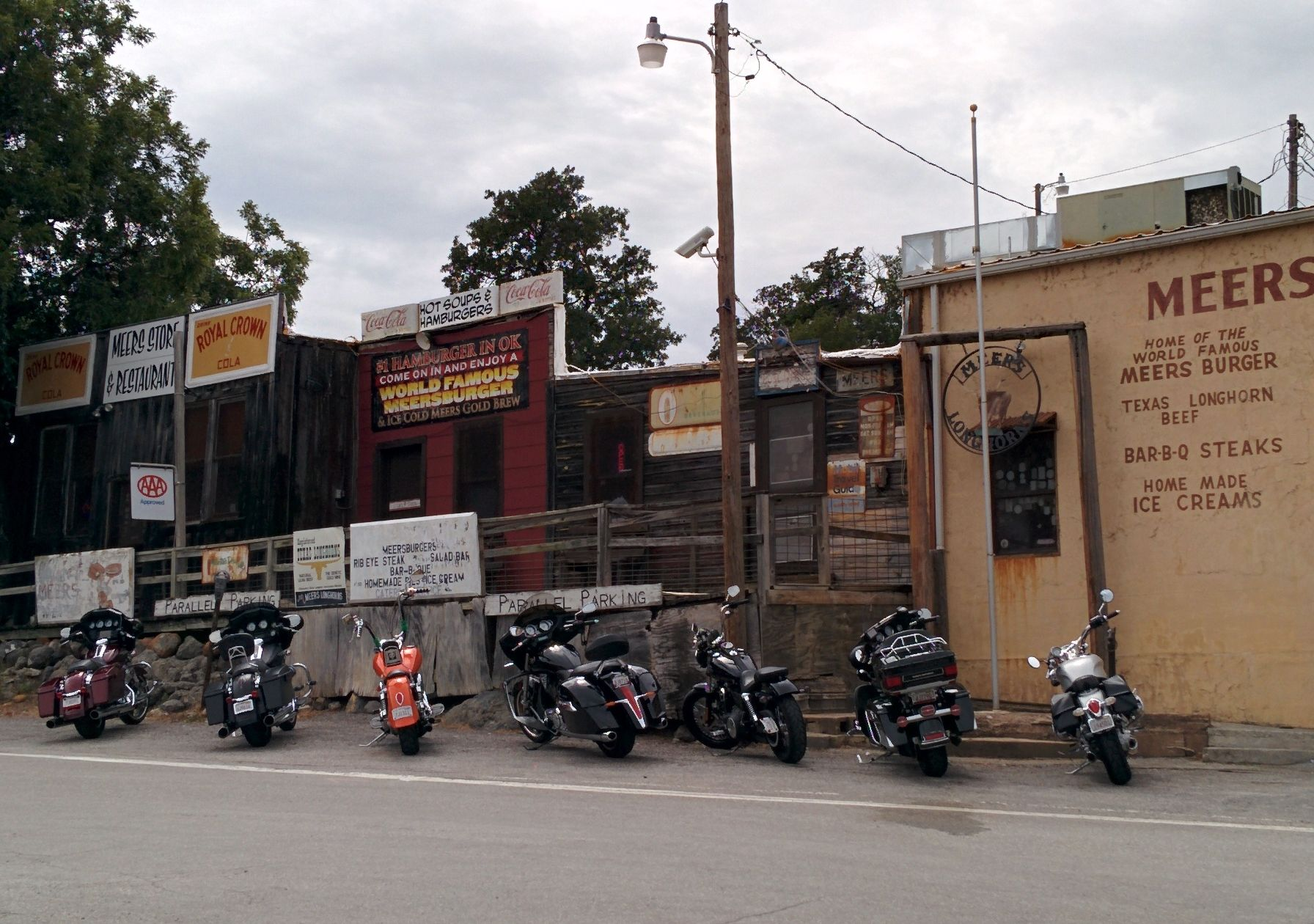
Meers Restaurant & Store

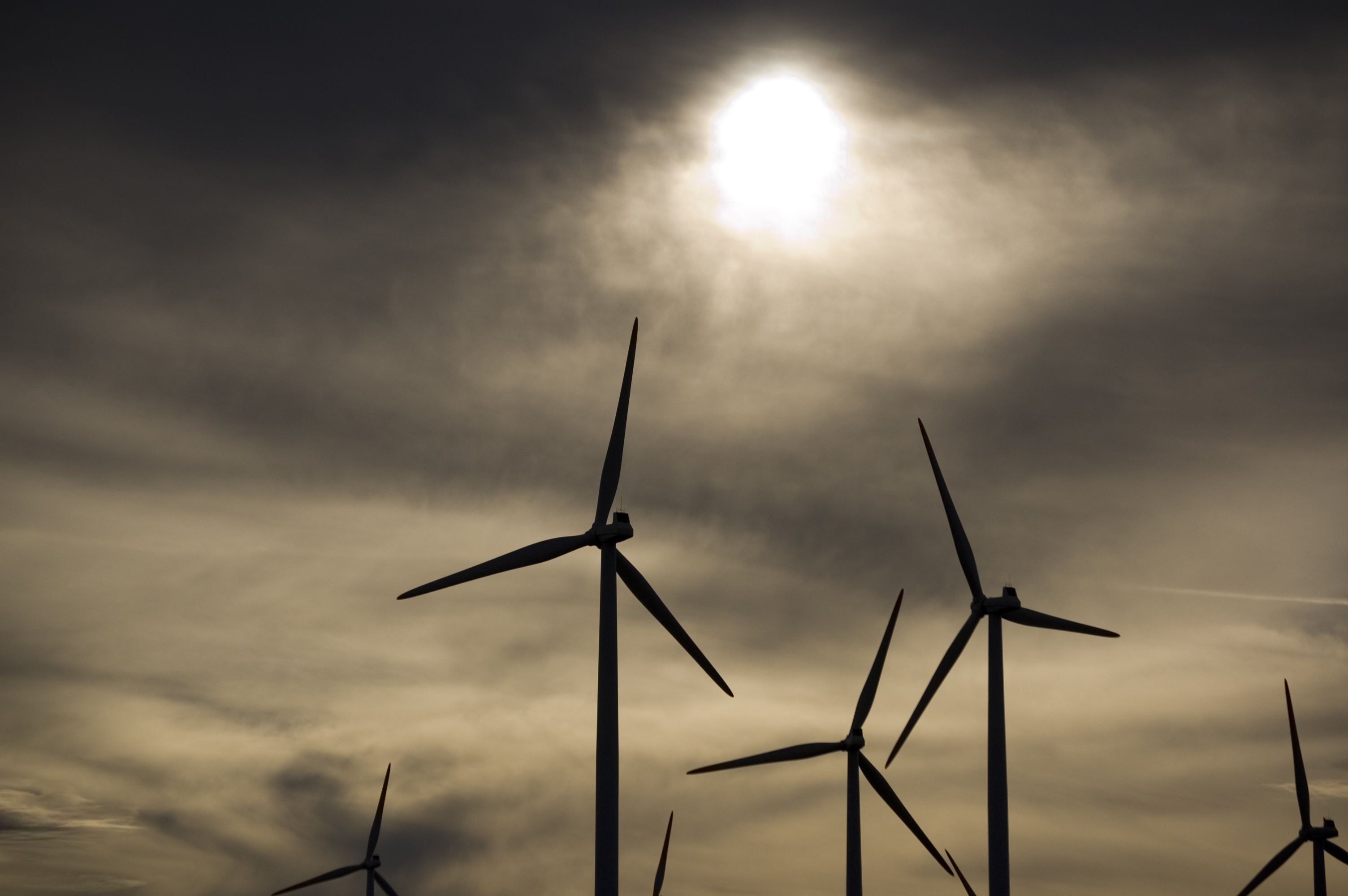
Wind turbines of Blue Canyon Wind Farm near Meers, Oklahoma

== Bibliography ==
- Allen, Iva Williams (1954). "Early Days in Meers". The Chronicles of Oklahoma. 32 (3 - Autumn 1954). Oklahoma Historical Society: 278–289. LCCN 23027299. OCLC 655582328.
- Shirk, George H. (January 1, 1987). Oklahoma Place Names. Norman, Oklahoma: University of Oklahoma Press. ISBN 978-0806120287. OCLC 15805183.
