= Oklahoma Geological Survey =

Oklahoma Geological Survey (OGS)

Agency overview
- Formed: May 29, 1908; 118 years ago
- Preceding agency: Oklahoma Territorial Survey
- Jurisdiction: Oklahoma
- Headquarters: Norman, Oklahoma; United States
- Employees: 42 (2016)
- Agency executives: Dr. Nick Hayman, Director; Mr. David Brown, Associate Director
- Website: ou.edu/ogs

The Oklahoma Geological Survey is a state agency chartered in the Constitution of Oklahoma responsible for collecting and disseminating information about Oklahoma's natural resources, geological formations, and earthquakes. Shortly after Oklahoma became a state, its first legislature passed an enabling act on May 29, 1908 and Governor Charles Haskell signed it into law. The OGS was an offshoot of Oklahoma Territory's Territorial Survey, which was established in 1900. OGS remains the only state geological survey that was created by a provision in the state constitution. In 1924, jurisdiction of the OGS was officially put under the Oklahoma University Board of Regents, and has not been changed since. In 2007, OGS became part of the Mewbourne College of Earth and Energy.

== History ==
The Oklahoma Geological Society was established on the Oklahoma University campus under an agreement between OU geology professor, Charles N. Gould, and the OU Dean of Arts and Sciences, Professor James S. Buchanan. Gould had founded the Oklahoma Geological Survey in 1908 and became its first director until 1911, when he left to go into private practice as a geologist. (Note: Gould returned to the Oklahoma Geological Survey as director in 1924, where he served until his retirement in 1931.)

In June, 1923, Governor Jack C. Walton, wanting to make major budget cuts to Oklahoma University, discontinued the Oklahoma Geological Survey. While Walton had been successful in removing the majority of the OU Board of Regents and replacing those members with his own supporters, his heavy handed approach toward the university had cost him much of his political support. He succeeded in having the former president, Stratton D. Brooks, resign, he was unable to bring in a high-quality president from outside before the start of the 1923–4 school year. In July, 1923, Walton appointed James S. Buchanan as Acting President. In his new role, Buchanan negotiated with Dr. Gould to revive the OGS on the OU campus in March, 1924. Moreover, Dr. Chester N. Gould returned to OU as director of the OGS.

== Facilities ==
The main facilities of OGS are located at the OU main campus in Norman, Oklahoma. In 1965, OGS began operating a small geophysical laboratory near Tulsa. Its main function is to analyze earthquake activity in the state, based on data reported to this site from other seismographs scattered around the state. The Oklahoma Petroleum Information Center, which opened in 2002, allowing the expansion of the core and sample library to house more than three hundred thousand cores from Oklahoma and elsewhere, preserving for future study and analysis earth samples acquired from wells drilled as far back as the 1920s. The building also houses the OGS publication sales office and an extensive library of petroleum data for Oklahoma.

== Mission ==
The mission of OGS is, "...to investigate the land, water, mineral, and energy resources of the state and to disseminate the results of those investigations to promote the wise use of Oklahoma's natural resources in a manner consistent with sound environmental practices."

The mission is carried out through research and field work which the agency publishes in books, open files, maps, and internet documents. Particular attention is given to topics related to petroleum and coal, which have an especially large impact on the state's economy. However, OGS also studies of non-fuel mineral resources, such as: clays, shales, limestone and dolomites, crushed stone, copper, bentonite, salt, gypsum, uranium, helium, and iodine. (Note: In the United States, the only production of iodine occurs in Oklahoma.)

== Leonard seismic observatory closure ==
OGS Interim Director Rick Andrews announced that the seismic observatory at Leonard, Oklahoma would close permanently during the summer of 2015. He said in a telephone interview with a reporter from the Tulsa World that the facility needed about $100,000 worth of maintenance and repairs in order to keep operating, but would still not be up-to-date.

The article noted that the observatory, which had been built by a subsidiary of Standard Oil Company of New Jersey in 1961, had later been used by the U. S. Government to monitor nuclear tests, before it was acquired by OGS. Most recently it had been tasked to monitor and find the cause of earthquake swarms shaking central and northern Oklahoma. Andrews added that a slowdown in internet speeds near the remote location had also reduced the value of the observatory in performing the OGS mission, and that the activities would improve only by moving them to the main facility at Norman, Oklahoma.

== Study of earthquake swarms in Oklahoma ==
Oklahoma experienced swarms of minor earthquakes that attracted public attention in Oklahoma, starting after 2005 - 2006, when there was an increase in oil and gas exploration. Most of these were low-magnitude (less than 3.0 on the moment magnitude scale), caused little physical damage and occurred in lightly populated rural areas of north central Oklahoma. The Oklahoma Geologic Survey believed that it had an obligation to perform scientific studies to determine why the phenomenon had suddenly occurred. The quakes continued, growing even more powerful, frequent and widespread.

By 2010–11, the number of quakes exceeding 5.0 in magnitude had become more significant. Some larger towns, such as Shawnee, Stillwater and Cushing had experienced more significant damage. In Shawnee, a tremor recorded as 5.9 knocked one of the four brick turrets off the top of the 100-year old main building. The other three identical turrets were still in place, but judged as so damaged that they had to be removed and completely rebuilt - with better earthquake reinforcement.

As more earth scientists began exchanging information, suspicion grew that some of the new techniques that have been developed to recover the last traces of crude oil and natural gas from nearly exhausted formations. Many began to believe that the injection of very high pressure waste water into underground formations, a process called "fracking" might be at least partially responsible for many of the quakes. In mid-April 2015, the Oklahoma Geological Society posted a statement that it considered wastewater injections are "..very likely..." causing the majority of Oklahoma's earthquakes. The Times article claimed that the OGS statement marked a distinct reversal of the state's previous position that the earthquakes were related to activities of the state's oil and gas industry. It noted that in the previous fall, the Republican governor had dismissed the idea in a public speech, stating that claims of such a relationship were only speculation and that more study was needed. After the OGS issued its statement in April, 2015, the Oklahoma Oil and Gas Association (OOGA), again disputed its conclusions and repeated that more study is needed. OOGA's president, Chad Warmington, said that we," ... don’t know enough about how wastewater injection impacts Oklahoma’s underground faults"..."Nor is there any evidence that halting wastewater injection would slow or stop the earthquakes.

== See also ==
- 2011 Oklahoma earthquake
- Geology of Oklahoma
