= Meers Fault =

Geological fault in Oklahoma, United States

- Location within Oklahoma
- Etymology: Meers, Oklahoma
- Year defined: 1930s
- Coordinates: 34°49′N 98°30′W
- Country: United States
- State: Oklahoma
- Cities: Cooperton, Meers, Apache, Fort Sill, Treasure Island and Elgin, Oklahoma

Characteristics
- Range: Anadarko Basin and the Wichita Mountains
- Part of: Frontal Wichita fault system
- Length: 54 km (34 mi)
- Strike: N63°W

Tectonics
- Status: inactive
- Type: reverse
- Age: Permian-Cambrian

Meers Fault is a fault in Oklahoma that extends from Kiowa County to Comanche County. It is marked by a 22–26 kilometers (14–16 mi) long conspicuous fault scarp but the fault extends beyond the ends of this scarp. The Meers fault is part of a group of faults that lie between the Anadarko Basin and the Wichita Mountains.

While the fault was active during the Permian-Cambrian, movement possibly accompanied by earthquakes took place during the Holocene and formed the fault scarp, with one earthquake occurring less than 2,000 years ago. There is currently no seismicity on the fault but it is considered an earthquake hazard.

== Appearance ==
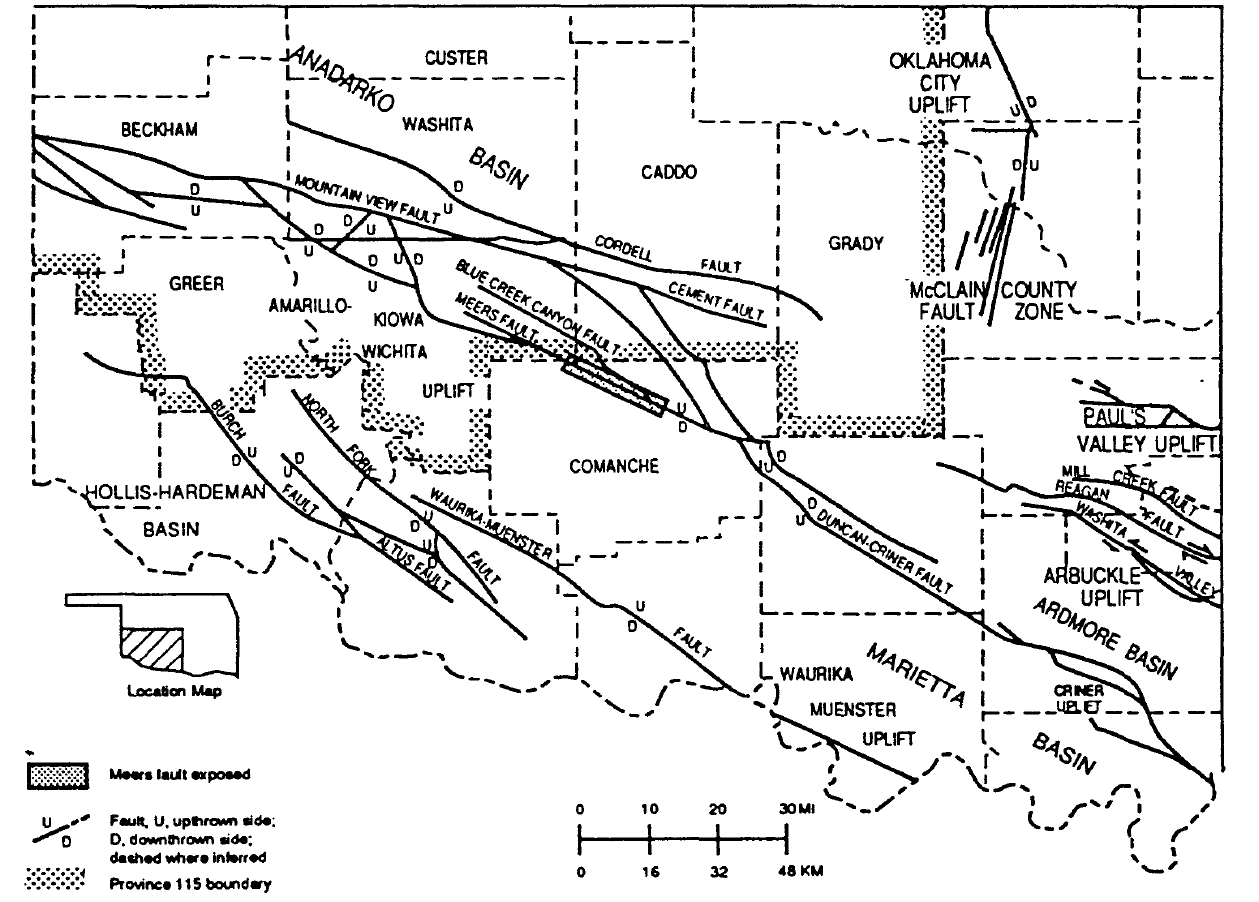
Map of faults in Oklahoma, with the Wichita Fault highlighted

The Meers Fault runs along the northern side of Meers Valley through Comanche County and Kiowa County and close to Caddo County in an east-southeast to north-northwest direction. Towns close to the fault are Cooperton, Meers, Apache, Fort Sill, Treasure Island and Elgin; Oklahoma State Highway 19, Oklahoma State Highway 115, Oklahoma State Highway 58 and U.S. Route 281 cross the fault and Oklahoma State Highway 44 might do so as well. The fault scarp is located on private land; the southeastern part runs through farmland and the northwestern part runs through hilly terrain.

The Meers fault is a reverse fault (at first it was interpreted to be a normal fault) with a straight path despite a variable topography; it probably does take the form of a broad dislocation rather than of a plane and its expression varies depending on the substrate rock. Underground, the fault may be over 100 kilometers (62 mi) long, and may be connected to another buried fault to the west (Willow Fault), potentially defining a 180 kilometers (112 mi) long fault system. It dips first northeastward but deeper it becomes either vertical or down-to-the-southwest, but certainly steep at depth. One interpretation is that the Meers fault is a "back-thrust" that dips northwards. Unlike many other faults, there is no evidence of segmentation in the Meers fault.

A conspicuous 5-meter (16 ft) high and 26-kilometer (16 mi)–22-kilometer (14 mi) long fault scarp just north of the Wichita Mountains is noticeable on Google Earth; it has formed on the Holocene part of the fault and continues southeastwards in the form of more subtle scarps although it may not exactly coincide with the path of the fault. Because the scarp is not present along the entire length of the fault, it is subdivided in a southeastern section in Comanche County and a northwestern section in Kiowa County, with only the southeastern section featuring a scarp. The scarp marks the Holocene section of the fault. The Meers fault is the only Mid-Continent fault scarp and has been called the "finest" such scarp east of the Rocky Mountains.

In low sun-angle photography additional scarps and splays can be observed. The erosion/sedimentation patterns and the path of drainages such as Canyon Creek may have been influenced by movement along the fault, and topographic ridges are offset. Finally ductile folding, vegetation and landform variations have also been recognized on the Meers fault. In some rock formations faulting has mainly led to warping, instead of brittle displacements and in several sites evidence of faulting appears to be concealed by floodplain sedimentation.

The fault separates Cambrian-Proterozoic igneous rocks from thick Cambrian-Ordovician age carbonates to the northeast. The igneous rocks belong to the Amarillo-Wichita uplift and are much more magnetic than the carbonates; this has been used to trace the fault with aeromagnetic techniques although the igneous rocks also reduce its visibility in reflection seismology studies. The nature of the surrounding rocks also influences the expression of the Meers fault, as it has a more pronounced scarp in erosion-resistant rock units.

=== Geological context ===
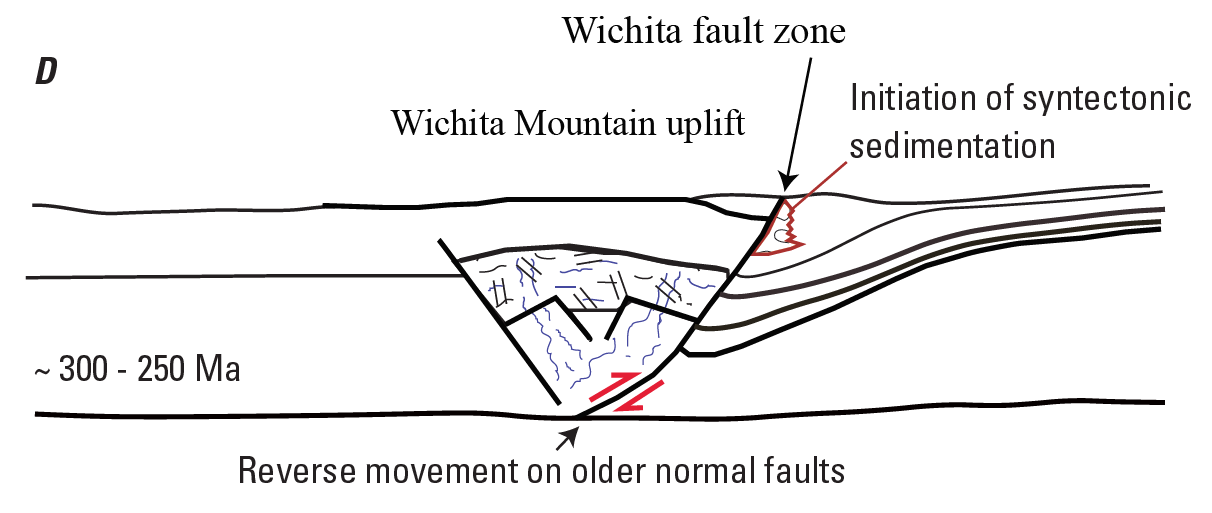
Geological cross section across the Wichita Mountains

The Meers fault is among the most prominent tectonic structures in the region. Other faults in the area are the Blue Creek Canyon fault which is connected to the Meers fault at its northwestern end, the Broxton Fault Complex northeast and the Mountain View fault to the north which intersects with and is also connected to the Meers fault. Additional faults in the region are the Cement, the Cordell and the Duncan-Criner faults.

All these faults lie in the area of the Frontal Wichita fault system, which is located between the Anadarko Basin to the north and the Amarillo-Wichita uplift to the south and separates the two. The fault system, which also includes the Meers fault as its southern margin, was active during the Mississippian to Permian, generating a total offset of about 12 kilometers (7.5 mi). The development of the Meers fault may have been influenced by the South Oklahoma aulacogen. Both the Wichita Mountains thrust and possibly a second fault are linked with the Meers fault, which is the only fault in the Wichita fault system with Holocene activity. A link to the Willow fault farther west has been proposed, which would prolong the fault system to 180 kilometres (110 mi) length and significantly increase its hazard.

== Geologic history ==
The Meers fault has been in existence for most of the Phanerozoic. It may have begun as a rift margin fault in the Proterozoic-Cambrian associated with the Southern Oklahoma Aulacogen but its maximum activity took place during the Mississippian and Permian when the Wichita Mountains and the Slick Hills were offset along it by about 2 kilometers (1.2 mi) and the Meers Valley formed along the fault. More fault movements occurred in the Permian and the Pleistocene although there are no post-Permian rock formations in the area that could allow an estimation of post-Paleozoic movements. However, Pleistocene sediments and Holocene alluvium have been offset, indicating fault movement during this time. Recent research has suggested that the whole fault may be of Quaternary age with little activity during the Pennsylvanian. During the history of the fault considerable uplift took place on its southern side while the recent movement has generated an opposite movement.

=== Holocene activity ===
Two to four earthquakes occurred during the Holocene in the last 6,000 years. One of which occurred 1,100–1,300 years ago and the other 2,000–2,900 years ago; two others were dated to 4,700–3,110 and 5,960–4,740 years before present. The dates have been obtained through radiocarbon dating on soil in trenches dug in the fault scarp and of offset alluvium deposits. Additional faulting appears to have occurred over 12,000 years ago, but evidence thereof was partly eroded away during a time of a wetter climate and prior to the Holocene the fault might have been inactive for 100,000–130,000 years. The slip rate has been estimated to be 0.02 millimeters per year (0.00079 in/year), which is typical for intraplate faults.

The Meers fault is the only fault on Oklahoma which has generated a rupture on the surface, resulting in about 5 meters (16 ft) of vertical offset over a 43 kilometers (27 mi) long distance. It is possible that the fault rupture was limited by geological structures that occur at the northwestern end of the Meers fault where it splays out. The possibility that faulting continued for another 30 kilometers (19 mi) along its northwestern end is equivocal with some evidence indicating that recent faulting was limited to Comanche County; research published in 2019 indicates that the northwestern segment did not move during the 1,200 BP earthquake but was active in the 3,400–2,900 BP event. The underground rupture on the other hand might reach a length of 70 kilometers (43 mi).

Reconstructions of the intensity of the Holocene earthquakes indicates magnitudes of M_{w} 6.75–7.25 with possibly similar intensities, with the terrain north of the fault being shifted upwards and leftwards relative to the terrain to its south; this latter movement and the position of the Meers fault are consistent with the tectonic stress pattern of North America which favours movement along the Meers fault unless one assumes a rotation of stress patterns in the South Oklahoma Aulacogen. The ratio of the horizontal to vertical motion is about 1.3–1.5 or about 2:1 although the amount of horizontal movement on the fault is controversial.

Alternatively, the fault movement could have occurred through aseismic creep as there is little evidence of strong ground shaking in the area as well as evidence against strong ground motion although the soils found close to the fault trace show evidence of fast movement. In general, the movement direction of the Meers fault is contentious.

=== Present-day status ===
The Meers fault presently is largely aseismic, with no earthquakes recorded along its Holocene trace or any evidence of aseismic creep although minor seismicity has been recorded and a M 4.2 earthquake close to Lawton in 1998 is close to the southeastern end of the Meers fault. Likewise, seismicity is scarce in the wider region and photographic analysis has shown little evidence of recent fault movement in other faults of the Wichita fault system.

== Seismological context and threats ==
The region is part of the stable continent and away from plate boundaries and other tectonically active areas. Earthquakes in Oklahoma have been observed in the areas of the southern Oklahoma aulacogen and of the Amarillo-Wichita uplift; in southwestern Oklahoma they are rare and of moderate intensity. In the wider area around the Meers fault such as in the Texas Panhandle, the Arbuckle Mountains and around Enola, Arkansas there is evidence of recent seismic and fault activity which may be part of a larger seismic zone. The activity of the Meers fault and other seismicity has been related to a continent-spanning fault zone and there might be a relation to the Brevard Zone in Atlanta as well.

Judging earthquake hazards in the central and eastern United States is made hard by the scarcity of geological evidence of seismicity, the long timespans between earthquakes and the shortness of the historical record thereof. In addition, earthquakes are often only weakly correlated to geological structures such as faults. Assessing the hazard potential for the Meers fault suffers from similar problems but it is considered the largest seismic hazard source of the central United States as it has the potential to cause large earthquakes and earthquakes in the central United States usually affect much larger regions than those of the western United States. In particular, it indicates that the Mid-Continent is not free of earthquakes and that the absence of recent seismicity does not rule out the presence of active faults. Other regional faults such as the Washita Valley fault which runs parallel to the Meers fault may also be capable of causing earthquakes.

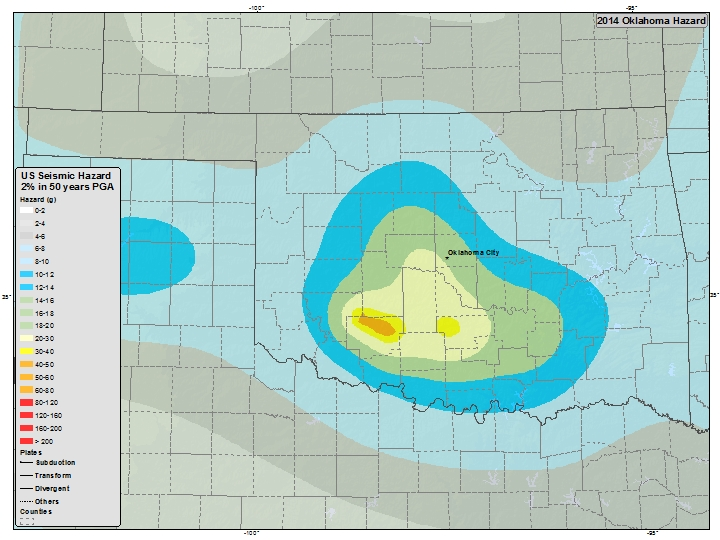
Earthquake hazard map published in 2014

The USGS national hazard map states that the Meers fault has a recurrence interval of 4,500 years but estimates range from 100,000 years to 1,300 years. The fault may generate strong earthquakes in the future; earthquakes with magnitudes M_{w} 7.5–8 might be possible on the Meers fault and an earthquake similar to the Holocene ones would be felt over large parts of the continent, including Oklahoma and Texas, with intensities comparable to these of the 1886 Charleston earthquake and 1811–1812 New Madrid earthquakes.

== Naming and research history ==
The fault was discovered during field work in the 1930s–1940s and is named after the town of Meers; previously it was known as the "Thomas fault" after a ranch named George Thomas Ranch and then as the "Meers Valley fault". The scarp was described as a Permian fault scarp before Holocene activity was discovered and made known by Gilbert 1983 and Donovan et al. 1983. The discovery of Holocene activity at the Meers fault was a surprise to scientists and attracted the attention of geologists after two publications in 1983 highlighted the young movements on this fault. The Meers fault is the best researched fault east of Colorado and one of six faults east of the Rocky Mountains that appear in the USA national seismic hazard models. Research published in 2019 has found that it is longer than believed until then.
