= 2016 Oklahoma earthquake =

Earthquake in Oklahoma, United States

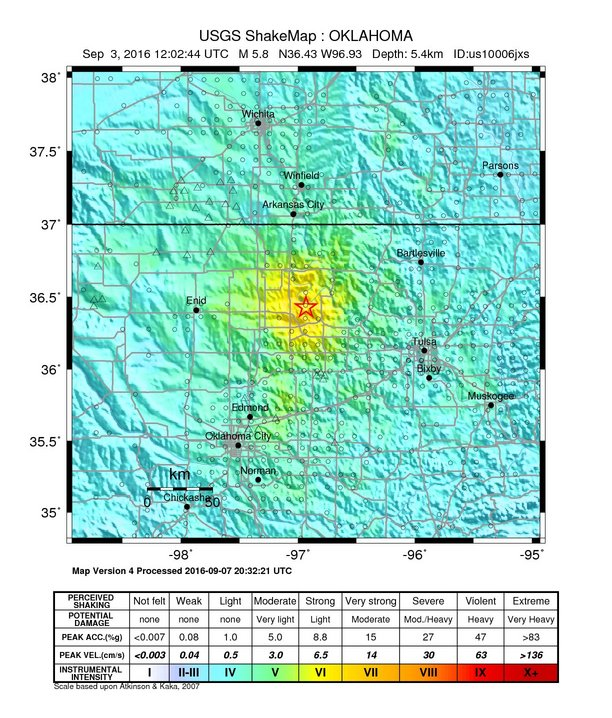
- ShakeMap of the 2016 Oklahoma earthquake

- Location within Oklahoma
- UTC time: 2016-09-03 12:02:44
- ISC event: 609392616
- USGS-ANSS: ComCat
- Local date: September 3, 2016
- Local time: 7:02:44 a.m. CDT
- Magnitude: 5.8 M_{w}
- Depth: 5.4 kilometers (3.4 mi)
- Epicenter: 36°25′48″N 96°55′55″W
- Type: Strike-slip
- Areas affected: United States
- Max. intensity: MMI VII (Very strong)
- Casualties: 1 injured
- Part of the 2009–present Oklahoma earthquakes

The 2016 Oklahoma earthquake occurred on September 3, 2016, near Pawnee, Oklahoma. Measuring 5.8 on the moment magnitude scale, it is the strongest in state history. At 5.8 magnitude, this ties it with the 2011 Virginia earthquake, which was determined after it struck to be the most powerful quake in the eastern United States in the preceding 70 years.

== Events ==
The initial quake was followed by nine local aftershocks between magnitudes 2.6 and 3.6 within three and one-half hours. Some news reports indicated that the earthquake was felt as far south as San Antonio, Texas, as far north as Fargo, North Dakota, as far east as Memphis, Tennessee, and as far west as Gilbert, Arizona.

The earthquake was the largest ever recorded in the state, substantially exceeding a 5.8 magnitude earthquake which struck near Fairview in February 2016 and slightly more powerful than the 5.7 magnitude 2011 Oklahoma earthquake in Prague, Oklahoma. It occurred amid a significant increase in induced earthquakes in the central and eastern United States over the seven preceding years. Oklahoma in particular saw earthquake rates increase by over two hundred times between 2009 and 2016, from a background average of one to three a year, between 1975 and 2008. It experienced 585 quakes of magnitude 3 and larger, in 2014, compared with only 100 in 2013. This was over three times the number experienced by seismically active California in 2014.

Following the earthquake, Pawnee Nation declared a state of emergency and closed off several of its buildings until such time as the damage could be examined. Regulators in Oklahoma ordered 37 wastewater disposal wells in the vicinity of the earthquake (see map in citation) to be rapidly closed. Oklahoma Governor Mary Fallin declared a state of emergency for Pawnee County where the worst of the damage was located. Thirty-two additional wells were shut down by the Environmental Protection Agency because they were determined to be located too close to the newly discovered fault on which the earthquake occurred.

Several months after the earthquake, in March 2017, Pawnee Nation filed a lawsuit in its own tribal court alleging that a selection of oil companies injecting wastewater underground were responsible for causing the earthquake. One of the lawyers working on the side of the tribe stated that the case was being taken to its own court as a way of stressing its sovereignty.

== Geology ==
The earthquake occurred along a previously unmapped buried strike-slip fault, and the epicenter is located near the junction of the two previously mapped faults, Watchorn fault and Labette fault.

== Damage ==
The earthquake caused moderate to severe damage around the epicenter, especially in Pawnee, where various buildings were damaged. Damage was recorded 300 miles from Pawnee in the Kansas City area at the Wyandotte County, Kansas courthouse, which sustained a crack from the roof to the ground. One person was injured as a result of the earthquake: in Pawnee, a man was hit by a falling chimney. There were also liquefaction-related ground damage during the earthquake. The locations of liquefaction damage do not align with the fault that ruptured, but coincide with areas dominated by Quaternary alluvial deposits.

== See also ==
- Oklahoma earthquake swarms (2009–present)
- 2011 Oklahoma earthquake
- Environmental impact of hydraulic fracturing in the United States#Seismicity
- Induced seismicity
- List of earthquakes in 2016
- List of earthquakes in the United States
- List of earthquakes in Oklahoma
