= Sparks, Oklahoma =

- Town
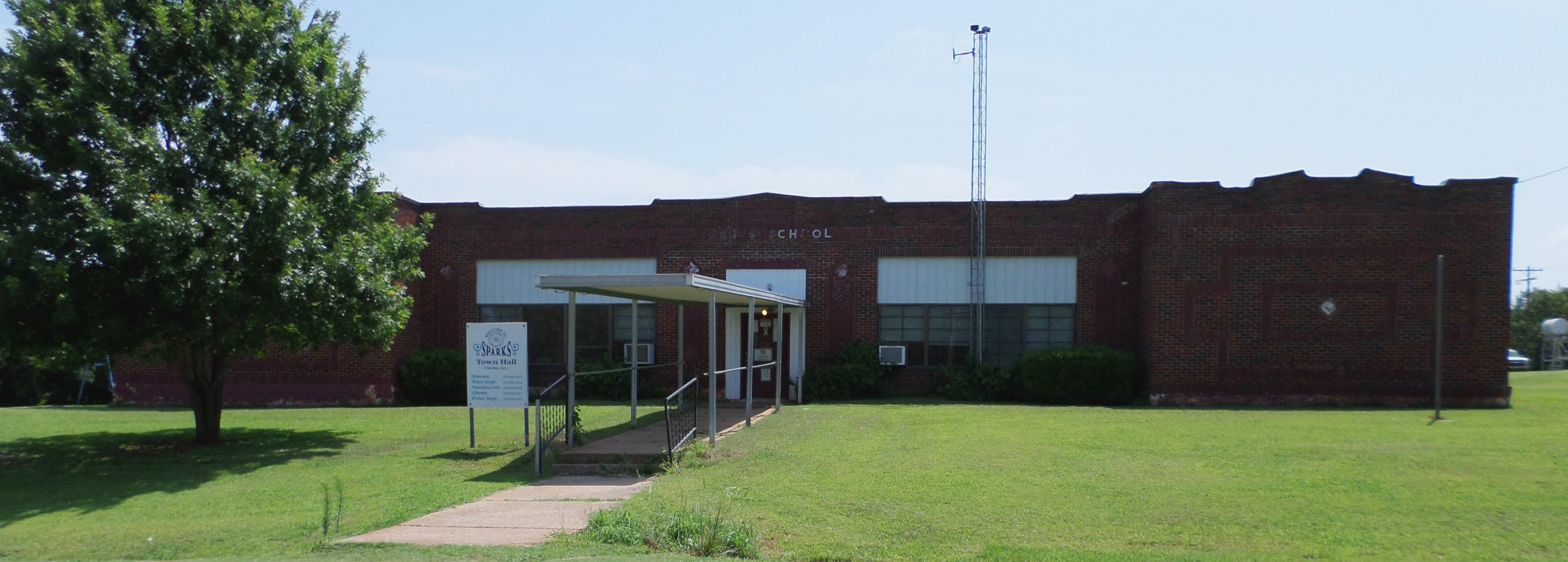
- Sparks Town Hall

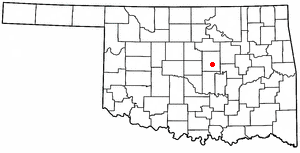
- Location of Sparks, Oklahoma
- Coordinates: 35°36′41″N 96°49′08″W
- Country: United States
- State: Oklahoma
- County: Lincoln

Area
  - Total: 0.41 sq mi (1.06 km^{2})
  - Land: 0.40 sq mi (1.03 km^{2})
  - Water: 0.0077 sq mi (0.02 km^{2})
- Elevation: 850 ft (260 m)

Population (2020)
  - Total: 122
  - Density: 305.4/sq mi (117.93/km^{2})
- Time zone: UTC-6 (Central (CST))
  - Summer (DST): UTC-5 (CDT)
- ZIP code: 74869
- Area codes: 539/918
- FIPS code: 40-68950
- GNIS feature ID: 2413312

Sparks is a town in Lincoln County, Oklahoma, United States. As of the 2020 census, Sparks had a population of 122. The center of population of Oklahoma is located in Sparks .

== Geography ==
According to the United States Census Bureau, the town has a total area of 0.4 square miles (1.0 km^{2}), of which 0.4 square miles (1.0 km^{2}) is land and 2.50% is water.

== Demographics ==
Historical population
| Census | Pop. | Note | %± |
|---|---|---|---|
| 1910 | 421 | | — |
| 1920 | 472 | | 12.1% |
| 1930 | 470 | | −0.4% |
| 1940 | 339 | | −27.9% |
| 1950 | 233 | | −31.3% |
| 1960 | 186 | | −20.2% |
| 1970 | 183 | | −1.6% |
| 1980 | 772 | | 321.9% |
| 1990 | 202 | | −73.8% |
| 2000 | 137 | | −32.2% |
| 2010 | 169 | | 23.4% |
| 2020 | 122 | | −27.8% |
U.S. Decennial Census

=== 2020 census ===
As of the 2020 census, Sparks had a population of 122. The median age was 37.5 years. 31.1% of residents were under the age of 18 and 18.0% of residents were 65 years of age or older. For every 100 females there were 114.0 males, and for every 100 females age 18 and over there were 121.1 males age 18 and over.

0.0% of residents lived in urban areas, while 100.0% lived in rural areas.

There were 50 households in Sparks, of which 34.0% had children under the age of 18 living in them. Of all households, 40.0% were married-couple households, 36.0% were households with a male householder and no spouse or partner present, and 22.0% were households with a female householder and no spouse or partner present. About 50.0% of all households were made up of individuals and 24.0% had someone living alone who was 65 years of age or older.

There were 69 housing units, of which 27.5% were vacant. The homeowner vacancy rate was 9.3% and the rental vacancy rate was 14.3%.

Racial composition as of the 2020 census
| Race | Number | Percent |
|---|---|---|
| White | 102 | 83.6% |
| Black or African American | 0 | 0.0% |
| American Indian and Alaska Native | 13 | 10.7% |
| Asian | 0 | 0.0% |
| Native Hawaiian and Other Pacific Islander | 0 | 0.0% |
| Some other race | 1 | 0.8% |
| Two or more races | 6 | 4.9% |
| Hispanic or Latino (of any race) | 2 | 1.6% |

=== 2000 census ===
As of the census of 2000, there were 137 people, 55 households, and 37 families residing in the town. The population density was 354.6 inhabitants per square mile (136.9/km^{2}). There were 73 housing units at an average density of 188.9 per square mile (72.9/km^{2}). The racial makeup of the town was 81.75% White, 3.65% African American, 11.68% Native American, and 2.92% from two or more races. Hispanic or Latino of any race were 0.73% of the population.

There were 55 households, out of which 36.4% had children under the age of 18 living with them, 49.1% were married couples living together, 7.3% had a female householder with no husband present, and 32.7% were non-families. 29.1% of all households were made up of individuals, and 12.7% had someone living alone who was 65 years of age or older. The average household size was 2.49 and the average family size was 3.08.

In the town, the population was spread out, with 29.2% under the age of 18, 5.8% from 18 to 24, 29.2% from 25 to 44, 23.4% from 45 to 64, and 12.4% who were 65 years of age or older. The median age was 36 years. For every 100 females, there were 114.1 males. For every 100 females age 18 and over, there were 110.9 males.

The median income for a household in the town was $20,000, and the median income for a family was $21,750. Males had a median income of $16,875 versus $12,083 for females. The per capita income for the town was $7,715. There were 22.9% of families and 25.4% of the population living below the poverty line, including 40.5% of under eighteens and 7.4% of those over 64.

== History ==
Located on the Deep Fork River in eastern Lincoln County and five miles (8 km) east of State Highway 18 on State Highway 18B, Sparks lies between Meeker and Chandler. The town is situated on land that was once part of the Sac and Fox Reservation, which was dissolved in 1890 when the principal chiefs signed an agreement with the Jerome Commission that each tribal member would receive a 160-acre (0.65 km^{2}) allotment. The surplus land was opened to settlement in a land run on September 22, 1891. The original townsite totaled 186 acres (0.75 km^{2}) and was homesteaded by William and Tabitha Baker.

The Eastern Oklahoma Railway (acquired by Atchison, Topeka and Santa Fe Railway in 1907) and the Fort Smith and Western Railroad (FS&W) established plans for a town at the junction of the two lines as they began surveying Lincoln County in 1902. The town was named in honor of George T. Sparks, an FS&W director. The first school, known as Ball School, was built southeast of Sparks in the late 1890s. In addition, there were two subscription schools, which charged a dollar per pupil per month. A post office was established on August 30, 1902, and the town eventually had approximately fifty businesses. Soon, two newspapers, the Sparks Review and the Sparks Visitor, were published, both Republican in politics. At 1907 statehood the population was 503.

When farm prices fell after World War I and during the Great Depression, people looked elsewhere for employment. In 1920 and 1930 the federal census reported 472 and 470 citizens, respectively. The last bank closed in 1938, and rail service ceased in 1939. By 1940 the population dropped to 339. The high school closed in 1957, and the grade school closed in 1993. The number of citizens declined from 233 in 1950 to 183 in 1970. At the turn of the 21st century the town, with 137 residents, had a post office, a few churches, a rural water district, a volunteer fire department, and two community centers, one in the Old Sparks School Building, which served as a senior citizens' center and town library.

On November 5, 2011, a 5.7-magnitude earthquake occurred near Sparks. At the time, it was the largest earthquake in Oklahoma's history. This record lasted for less than five years; a larger, 5.8-magnitude earthquake broke the record on September 3, 2016.
