= 2011 Oklahoma earthquake =

2011 earthquake near Prague, Oklahoma

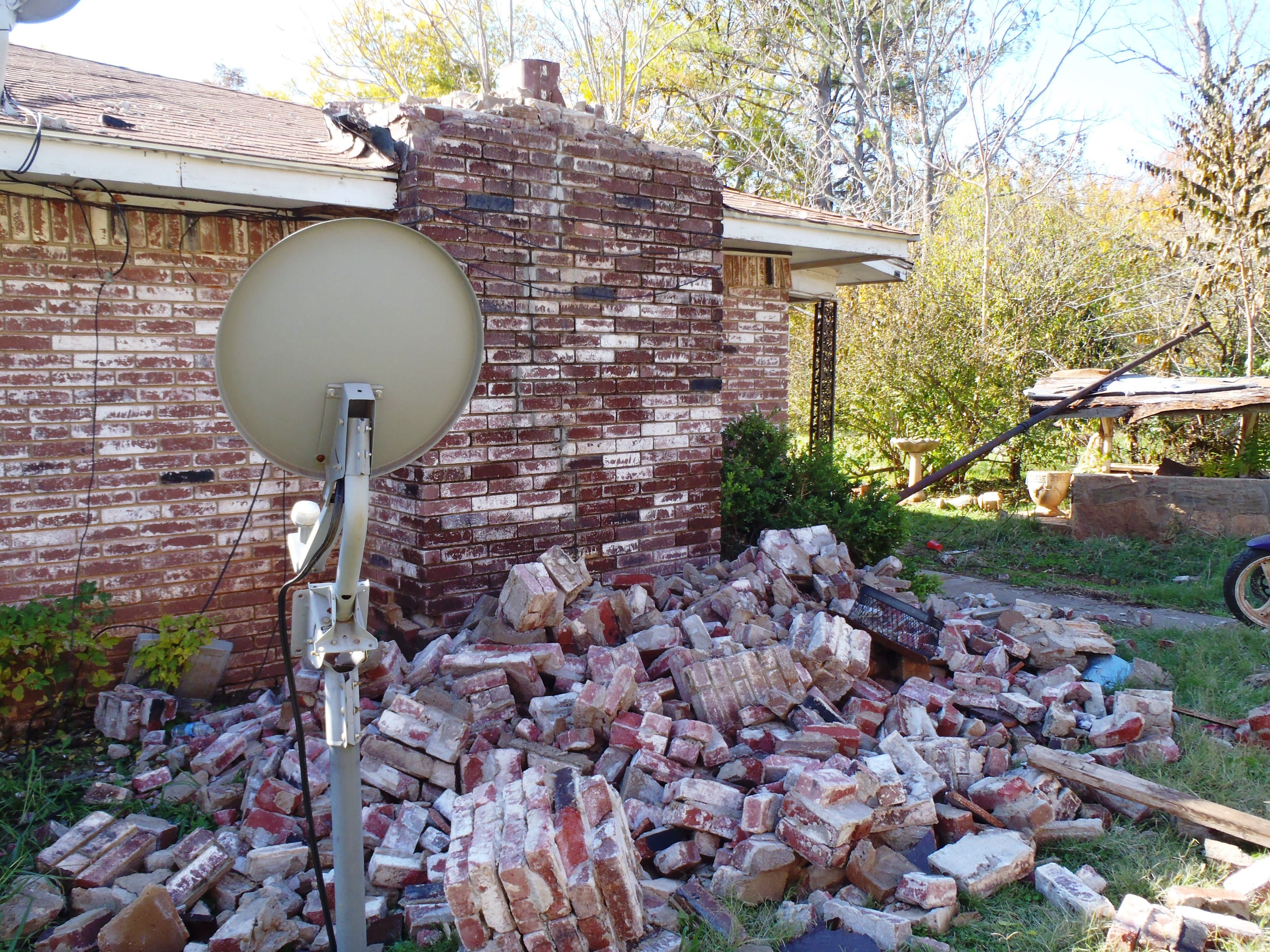
- Chimney damage from the earthquake

- Location within Oklahoma
- UTC time: 2011-11-06 03:53:10
- ISC event: 17507292
- USGS-ANSS: ComCat
- Local date: November 6, 2011
- Local time: 10:53:10 p.m. CDT
- Magnitude: 5.7 M_{w}
- Depth: 5.2 kilometers (3 mi)
- Epicenter: 35°35′56″N 96°45′07″W
- Type: Strike-slip
- Areas affected: United States
- Max. intensity: MMI VIII (Severe)
- Casualties: Two injured
- Part of the 2009–present Oklahoma earthquakes

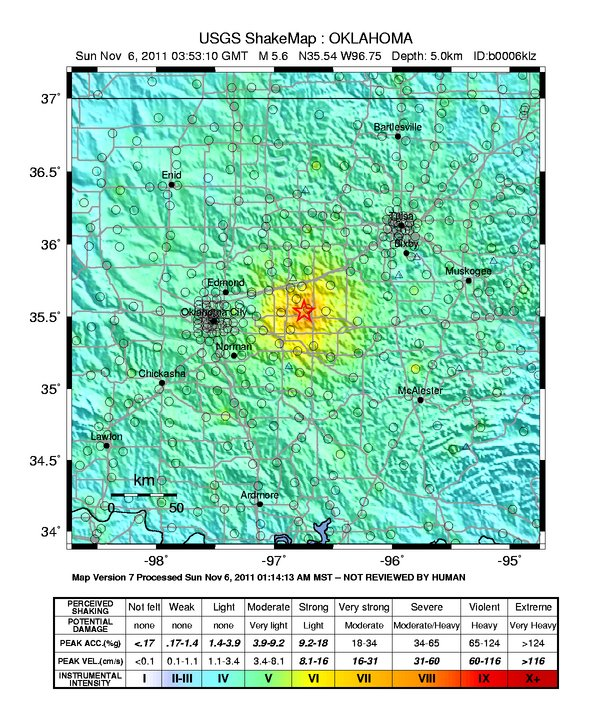
USGS ShakeMap for the Oklahoma earthquake

The 2011 Oklahoma earthquake was a 5.7 magnitude intraplate earthquake which occurred near Prague, Oklahoma on November 5 at 10:53 p.m. CDT (03:53 UTC November 6) in the U.S. state of Oklahoma. The epicenter of the earthquake was in the vicinity of several active wastewater injection wells. According to the United States Geological Survey (USGS), it was the most powerful earthquake ever recorded in Oklahoma until the 2016 Oklahoma earthquake. The previous record was a 5.5 magnitude earthquake that struck near the town of El Reno in 1952. The quake's epicenter was approximately 44 miles (71 km) east-northeast of Oklahoma City, near the town of Sparks and was felt in the neighboring states of Texas, Arkansas, Kansas and Missouri and even as far away as Tennessee and Wisconsin. The quake followed several minor quakes earlier in the day, including a 4.7 magnitude foreshock. The quake had a maximum perceived intensity of VIII (Severe) on the Mercalli intensity scale in the area closest to the epicenter. Numerous aftershocks were detected after the main quake, with a few registering at 4.0 magnitude.

In March 28, 2016 the USGS released the USGS National Seismic Hazard Map which concluded that the primary cause of the earthquake in Oklahoma in 2011 was pressure on faults from cumulative effects of injecting oil drilling wastewater under high pressure into the underground. Although the 2011 earthquake was the largest on record, the USGS reported that the central and eastern U.S. (CEUS) has undergone the most dramatic increase in seismic activity in the United States since 2009 with an average of 318 earthquakes of magnitude 3.0 a year up from 24 a year from 1973 to 2008. In 2015 there were 1,010 earthquakes in the CEUS region. By mid-March 2016 there were already 226 earthquakes of magnitude 3.0 and larger in the CEUS. "Earthquake rates have recently increased markedly in multiple areas of the Central and Eastern United States (CEUS), especially since 2010, and scientific studies have linked the majority of this increased activity to wastewater injection in deep disposal wells."

== Geology ==
The Oklahoma Geological Survey believes the earthquake occurred along the Wilzetta Fault, which is also known as the Seminole Uplift. The Wilzetta Fault is a 55-mile (89 km) long fault zone that runs from central Pottawatomie County to the western part of Creek County. It is a strike-slip fault, where two adjacent crustal blocks slide horizontally past each other, but unlike the similar moving San Andreas Fault, the Wilzetta Fault is not located near the margins of any tectonic plates. From 1972 to 2008, between two and six earthquakes were recorded annually by the USGS, however 50 were recorded in 2009. The USGS and the Oklahoma Geological Survey are installing more seismometers to better monitor the increased activity. Aftershocks from the 5.6 quake, including some that can be felt, were expected to last for months. The Oklahoma Geological Survey reported in 2011 that a minor earthquake swarm which occurred in January 2011 could possibly have been due to hydraulic fracturing, which is a process used to extract oil from oil wells. In November 2011 several geologists with the USGS that were contacted by The Huffington Post said that the 5.6 magnitude quake was not due to the mechanical process of hydraulic fracturing itself, which they said causes tremors on a much smaller scale.

According to the 2016 USGS report, "Earthquake rates have recently increased markedly in multiple areas of the Central and Eastern United States (CEUS), especially since 2010, and scientific studies have linked the majority of this increased activity to wastewater injection in deep disposal wells." In March 2013, an article published in the scientific journal Geology observed that "the volume of fluid injected into the subsurface related to the production of unconventional resources continues to rise" and this potentially triggered the earthquake. An issue of the Journal of Geophysical Research published in March 2014 found that a magnitude 5.0 foreshock believed to be induced by fluid injection promoted failure of the rupture plain of the November 5 mainshock.

== Damage ==
Early reports indicated that U.S. Route 62 had "buckled" in three locations and that several nearby homes had major damage and there were also numerous reports of broken windows and other minor damage, mostly to residences. Some local residents reported minor masonry damage and a chimney collapsed at one residence, while a few residents near the epicenter reported a noise which sounded like thunder in the distance as the earthquake struck. The Oklahoma Department of Emergency Management reported that two people suffered minor injuries, 14 homes had various levels of damage, and that Benedictine Hall at St. Gregory's University in Shawnee had one turret collapse and two others damaged, forcing the closure of the building. Sandra and Gary Ladra of Prague, suffered physical injuries and damage to their home, during the earthquake. They sued Spess Oil and Old Dominion, LLC, for compensation. In July 2017, Spess came to a confidential settlement in the case, which was before the Oklahoma Supreme Court.

== Radar imagery ==
The National Weather Service (NWS) reported that weather radar detected insects, bats and birds which had apparently taken flight immediately after the quake. The NWS radar indicated that the tremors were significant enough that those animals that could leave the ground, did so.

== See also ==
- Oklahoma earthquake swarms (2009–present)
- 2016 Oklahoma earthquake
- List of earthquakes in 2011
- List of earthquakes in Oklahoma
- List of earthquakes in the United States
