= Prague, Oklahoma =

- City
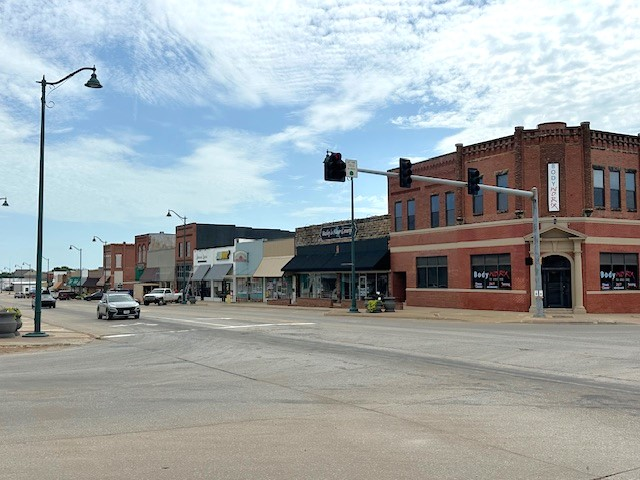
- Prague's Downtown in July 2025

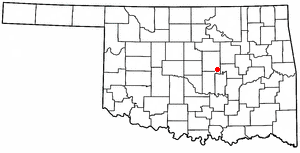
- Location of Prague, Oklahoma
- Coordinates: 35°29′56″N 96°42′00″W
- Country: United States
- State: Oklahoma
- County: Lincoln

Government
  - Mayor: Nikki Everhart

Area
  - Total: 3.49 sq mi (9.05 km^{2})
  - Land: 3.14 sq mi (8.13 km^{2})
  - Water: 0.36 sq mi (0.93 km^{2})
- Elevation: 948 ft (289 m)

Population (2020)
  - Total: 2,356
  - Density: 750.8/sq mi (289.88/km^{2})
- Time zone: UTC−6 (Central (CST))
  - Summer (DST): UTC−5 (CDT)
- ZIP Code: 74864
- Area codes: 405/572
- FIPS code: 40-60500
- GNIS feature ID: 2411483
- Website: cityofpragueok.org

Prague (/ˈpreɪɡ/ PRAYG) is a city in Lincoln County, Oklahoma, United States. The population was 2,356 at the 2020 census, a 1.76 percent decrease from the figure of 2,388 in 2010. Czech immigrants founded the city, and named it after the capital of the present-day Czech Republic.

== History ==
After the opening of the Sac and Fox Reservation by a land run on September 22, 1891, Czech immigrants settled and founded Prague. Eva Barta owned the land, and named the new town "Prague" for the Czech capital in Europe, then part of Austria-Hungary. The town incorporated in 1902. The town's name has been adopted in Sac and Fox language as Pwêkeki.

On March 27, 1943, the film Hangmen Also Die! had its world premiere in Prague in an event which featured Adolf Hitler, Hirohito and Mussolini being hanged in effigy on Main Street. The town of Prague was apparently chosen because the movie is loosely based on the 1942 assassination of Reinhard Heydrich, the Nazi Reich Protector of the German-occupied city of Prague, now in the Czech Republic. After the premiere, the film opened nationwide in the first days of April, beginning with 20 key cities.

On May 24, 1952, a head-on automobile collision seriously injured Indian mystic Meher Baba near Prague. The accident site has become a place of pilgrimage for world wide Meher Baba followers.

An F5 tornado tore through Prague on May 5, 1960.

For the 1996 Summer Olympics, the torch was carried through the town of Prague in order to commemorate the legacy of the legendary Sac and Fox native Olympic athlete, Jim Thorpe, who was born and raised in this region.

On November 5, 2011, a series of earthquakes struck near Prague, the first one a magnitude 4.7 at 2:15 a.m. CST, followed by a series of aftershocks, and then a second quake of magnitude 5.7 at 10:53 p.m. CST, the strongest recorded in Oklahoma history until a 5.8-magnitude earthquake occurred on September 3, 2016. This continued on November 7, 2011 when another 4.7 hit at 8:45 p.m., just five miles northwest of Prague.

On February 2, 2024, there was a 5.1 magnitude earthquake around 11:25pm.

== Geography ==
According to the United States Census Bureau, the city has a total area of 1.8 square miles (4.7 km^{2}), all land.

== Demographics ==
Historical population
Census	Pop.	Note	%±
1910	1,025		—
1920	1,127		10.0%
1930	1,299		15.3%
1940	1,422		9.5%
1950	1,546		8.7%
1960	1,545		−0.1%
1970	1,802		16.6%
1980	2,208		22.5%
1990	2,308		4.5%
2000	2,138		−7.4%
2010	2,386		11.6%
2020	2,356		−1.3%
U.S. Decennial Census

=== 2020 census ===
As of the 2020 census, Prague had a population of 2,356. The median age was 39.6 years, with 24.6% of residents under the age of 18 and 19.0% of residents 65 years of age or older. For every 100 females there were 93.0 males, and for every 100 females age 18 and over there were 87.1 males age 18 and over.

0% of residents lived in urban areas, while 100.0% lived in rural areas.

There were 997 households in Prague, of which 30.1% had children under the age of 18 living in them. Of all households, 42.6% were married-couple households, 18.9% were households with a male householder and no spouse or partner present, and 31.7% were households with a female householder and no spouse or partner present. About 32.6% of all households were made up of individuals and 16.0% had someone living alone who was 65 years of age or older.

There were 1,109 housing units, of which 10.1% were vacant. Among occupied housing units, 58.7% were owner-occupied and 41.3% were renter-occupied. The homeowner vacancy rate was 0.8% and the rental vacancy rate was 8.6%.

Racial composition as of the 2020 census
Race	Percent
White	79.7%
Black or African American	3.5%
American Indian and Alaska Native	7.1%
Asian	0.2%
Native Hawaiian and Other Pacific Islander	0%
Some other race	1.1%
Two or more races	8.4%
Hispanic or Latino (of any race)	3.0%

=== 2000 census ===
As of the census of 2000, there were 2,138 people, 864 households, and 567 families residing in the city. The population density was 1,211.6 inhabitants per square mile (467.8/km^{2}). There were 1,021 housing units at an average density of 578.6 per square mile (223.4/km^{2}). The racial makeup of the city was 83.07% White, 3.70% African American, 9.92% Native American, 0.33% Asian, 0.09% from other races, and 2.90% from two or more races. Hispanic or Latino of any race were 1.12% of the population.

There were 864 households, out of which 31.9% had children under the age of 18 living with them, 49.9% were married couples living together, 11.6% had a female householder with no husband present, and 34.3% were non-families. 30.9% of all households were made up of individuals, and 17.0% had someone living alone who was 65 years of age or older. The average household size was 2.34 and the average family size was 2.91.

In the city, the population was spread out, with 25.3% under the age of 18, 7.8% from 18 to 24, 27.6% from 25 to 44, 19.9% from 45 to 64, and 19.4% who were 65 years of age or older. The median age was 39 years. For every 100 females, there were 84.2 males. For every 100 females age 18 and over, there were 81.9 males.

The median income for a household in the city was $26,779, and the median income for a family was $32,137. Males had a median income of $24,083 versus $19,438 for females. The per capita income for the city was $14,381. About 11.3% of families and 17.0% of the population were below the poverty line, including 17.4% of those under age 18 and 15.9% of those age 65 or over.

== Newspapers ==
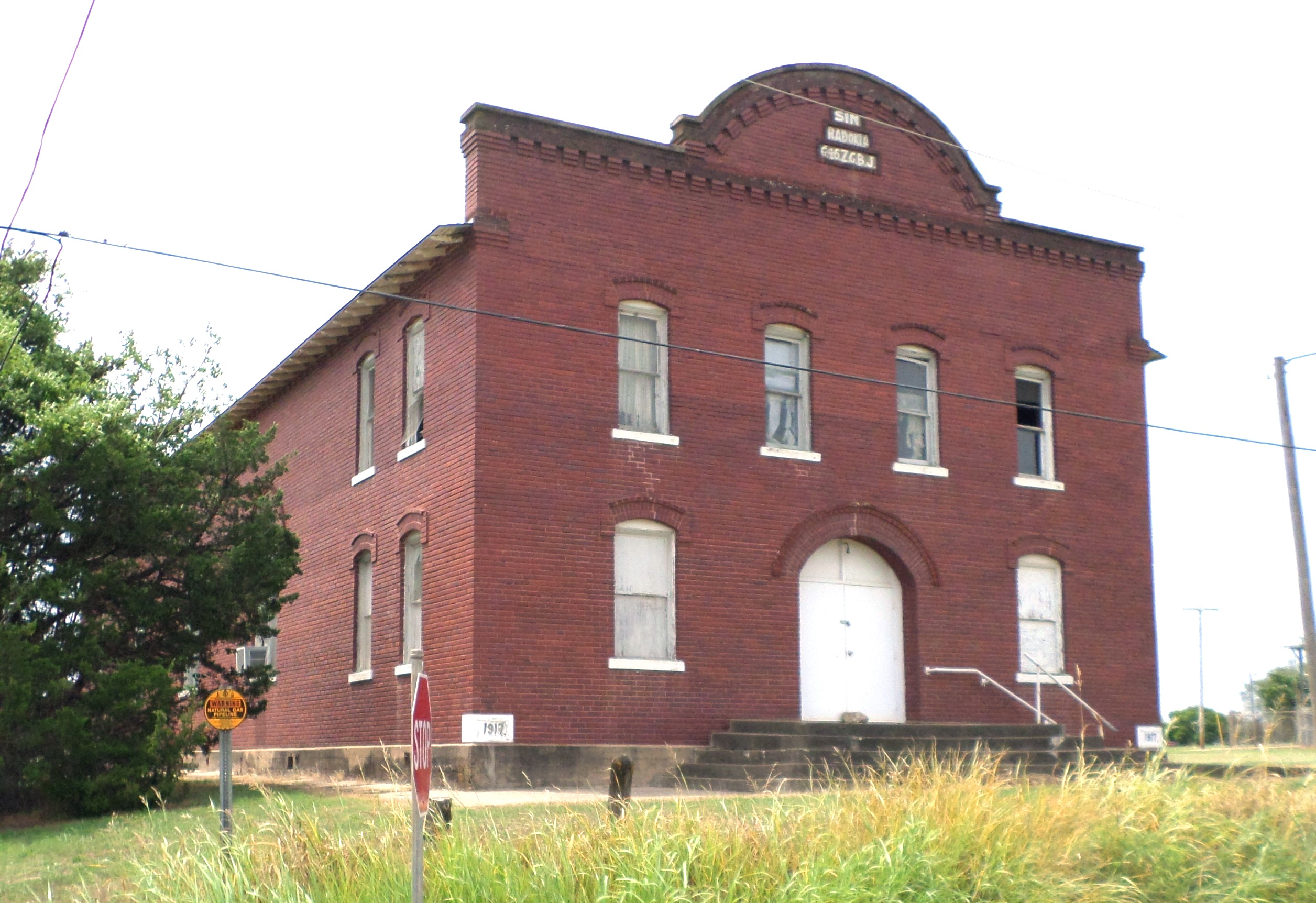
Bohemian Hall, an early symbol of Prague's Czech heritage

The Shawnee News Star and the Prague Times Herald, provide news coverage of Prague.

The Oklahomski Noviny was a Czech-language newspaper printed in Prague in the 20th century.

== Education ==
The Prague Public Schools, the school district for this community, serve approximately 1000 students.

== Economy ==
Agriculture, with corn as the primary crop, initially drove Prague's economy. This was still true at the beginning of the 21st century. Industry and commerce began to contribute later.

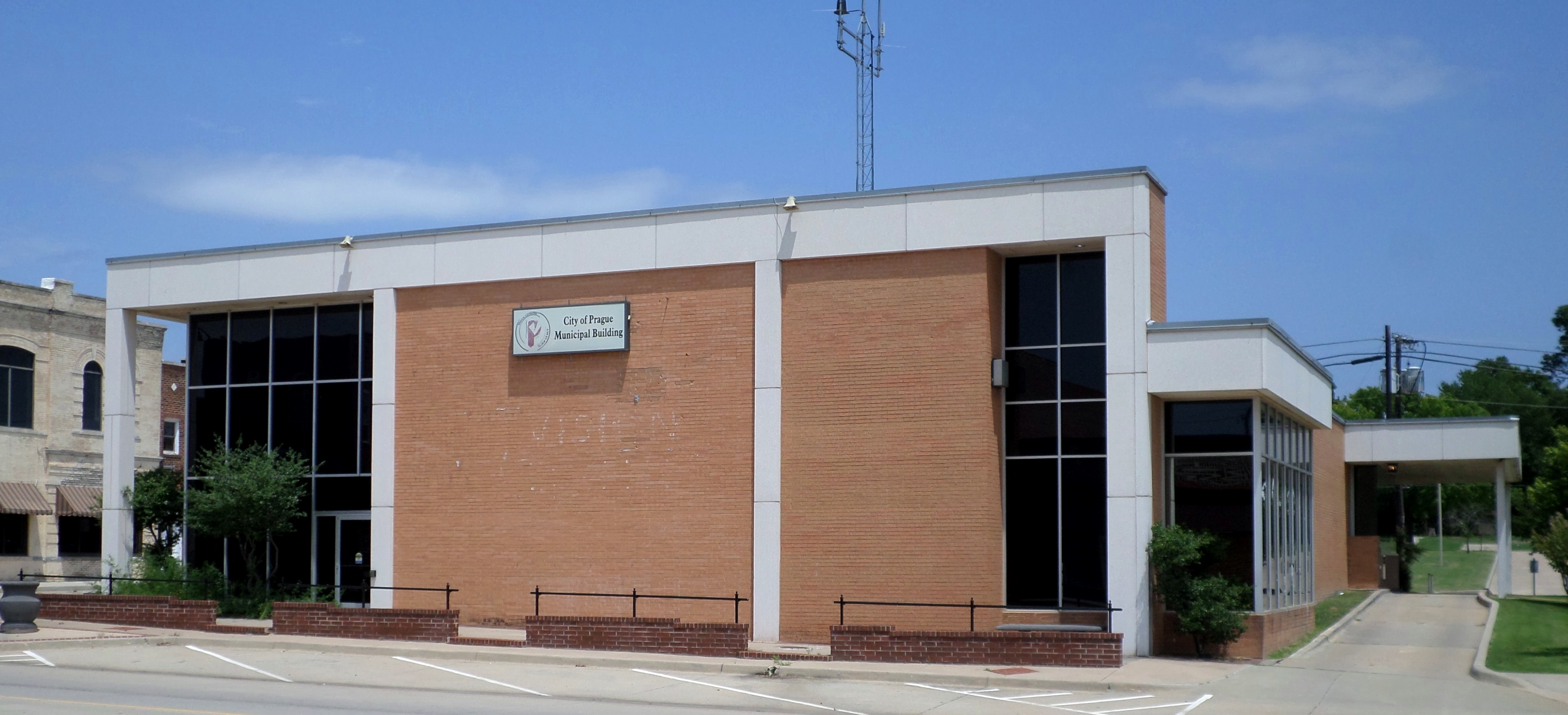
Prague Municipal Building

== Government ==
Prague has a council-manager form of city government.

== Transportation ==
Prague is at the intersection of U.S. Routes 377 and 62, and is approximately 10 minutes north of Interstate 40.

The Prague-owned Prague Municipal Airport (FAA Identifier—O47) is two miles west of town, and features a 3600’ asphalt runway.

== Culture ==
The Prague Historical Museum is located on the town's main street, Jim Thorpe Boulevard. The street is named for Olympic athlete and Sac and Fox Tribe member Jim Thorpe.

Reflecting its Czech Catholic heritage, Prague has hosted an annual "Kolache Festival" on the first Saturday in May since 1965. The festival was cancelled in 2020 for the first time due to the COVID-19 pandemic. Prague is also the home of a Papal-authorized copy of the Infant Jesus of Prague, known as the National Shrine of the Infant Jesus, which draws numerous visitors each year.

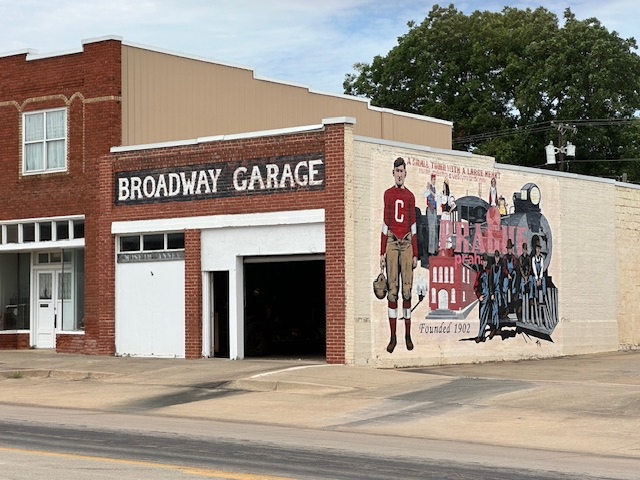
Prague history mural featuring Jim Thorpe, July 2025

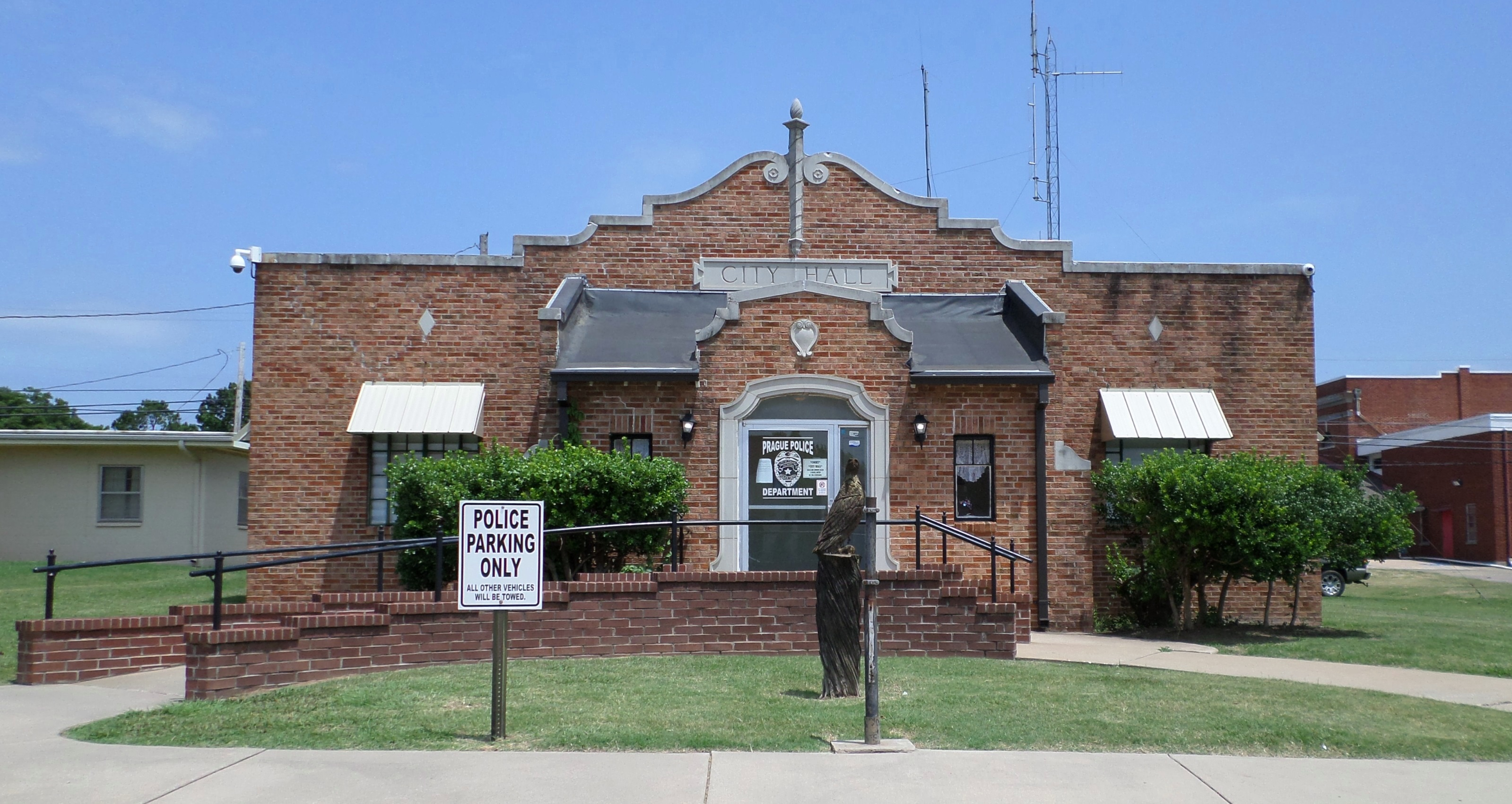
Prague City Hall and Jail

== Notable people ==
- Kyle Denney (born 1977), baseball player
- Walter E. Fountain (born 1961), United States Army officer
- Olinka Hrdy (1902–1987), artist
- Richard James (1926–2013), lawyer and legislator
- Orville Edwin Langley (1908–1973), U.S. District Judge for Eastern Oklahoma (1965-1973)
- Jim Thorpe (1887–1953), athlete, the first Native American Olympic gold medalist

== NRHP sites ==
The following sites in Prague are listed on the National Register of Historic Places:

- Prague City Hall and Jail
- ZCBJ Lodge No. 46, also known as Bohemian Hall
